= Battle of Tsushima =

1905 naval battle of the Russo-Japanese War

- Part of the Russo-Japanese War
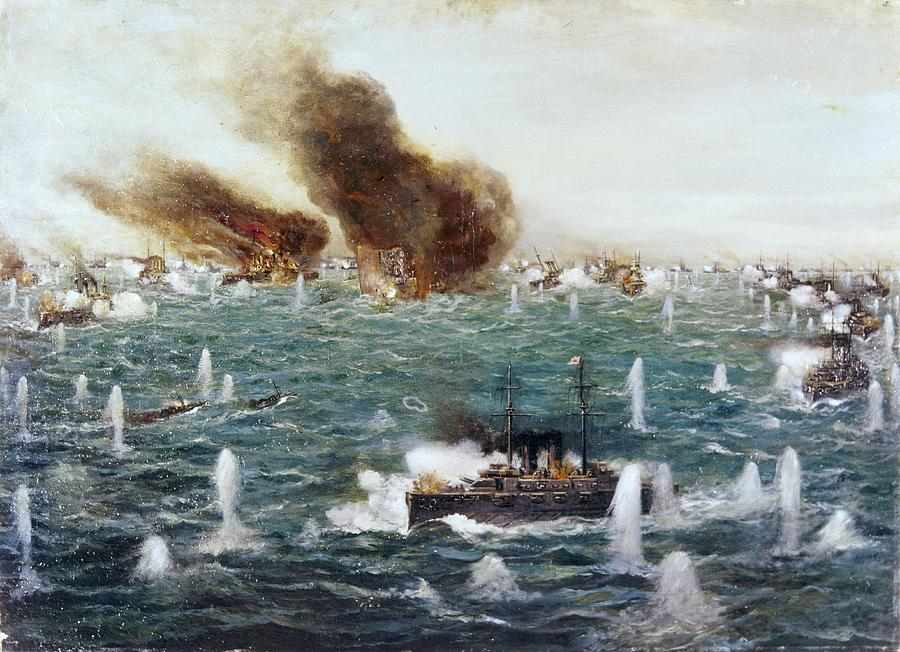
- Painting of the battle by Tōjō Shōtarō, 1905
Date	27–28 May 1905
Location	Tsushima Strait 34.45°N 130.15°E
Result	Japanese victory

Belligerents
Japan	Russia

Commanders and leaders
(Empire of Japan) Tōgō Heihachirō (Empire of Japan) Kamimura Hikonojō (Empire of Japan) Kataoka Shichirō	(Russian Empire) Zinovy Rozhestvensky (surrendered) (Russian Empire) Nikolai Nebogatov (surrendered) (Russian Empire) Oskar Enqvist

Strength
4 battleships 29 cruisers 4 gunboats (Note: Including an obsolete ironclad battleship ex-Chinese Chin'en); 21 destroyers 45 torpedo boats (Note: 31 torpedo boats of the Combined Fleet, 4 torpedo boats from Kure Naval District, and 10 torpedo boats from Takeshiki Guard District. (Note: See Battle of Tsushima order of battle.)); 22 auxiliary vessels	8 battleships 3 coastal battleships 9 cruisers 9 destroyers 9 auxiliary vessels

Casualties and losses
117 dead 583 injured 3 torpedo boats sunk (255 tons sunk) (Note: 265 tons total loss.)	5,045 dead 803 injured 6,016 captured 6 battleships sunk 1 coastal battleship sunk 14 other ships sunk 2 battleships captured 2 coastal battleships captured 1 destroyer captured 6 ships disarmed (135,893 tons sunk) (Note: 198,721 tons total loss.)

The Battle of Tsushima (Note: Russian: Цусимское сражение, romanized: Tsusimskoye srazheniye; Japanese: 日本海海戦, romanized: Nihonkai kaisen.) was the final naval battle of the Russo-Japanese War, fought on 27–28 May 1905 in the Tsushima Strait. A devastating defeat for the Imperial Russian Navy, the battle was the only decisive engagement ever fought between modern steel battleship fleets and the first in which wireless telegraphy (radio) played a critically important role. The battle was described by contemporary Sir George Clarke (Note: One of the premier military planners of the UK at the time, having served on the Elgin Commission and being one of the primary members of Esher Committee together with Lord Esher and Admiral Sir John (Jacky) Fisher.) as by far the greatest and the most important naval event since Trafalgar. The battle is known in Japan as the Naval Battle of the Sea of Japan. (Note: (Nihonkai Kaisen (Japanese: 日本海海戦)) Historically, this battle was occasionally also called Tsushima Oki Kaisen, The Naval-battle Off Tsushima Island (対馬沖海戦) in Japan, but not any longer.)

The battle involved the Japanese Combined Fleet under Admiral Tōgō Heihachirō and the Russian Second Pacific Squadron under Admiral Zinovy Rozhestvensky, which had sailed over seven months and 18,000 nautical miles (33,000 km) from the Baltic Sea. The Russians hoped to reach Vladivostok and establish naval control of the Far East to relieve the Imperial Russian Army in Manchuria. The Russian fleet had a large advantage in the number of battleships, but was overall older and slower than the Japanese fleet, and was outnumbered nearly three to one in total hulls. The Russians were sighted in the early morning on 27 May, and the battle began in the afternoon. Rozhestvensky was wounded and knocked unconscious in the initial action, and four of his battleships were sunk by sunset. At night, Japanese destroyers and torpedo boats attacked the remaining ships, and Admiral Nikolai Nebogatov surrendered in the morning of 28 May.

All 11 Russian battleships were lost, of which seven were sunk and four captured. Only a few warships escaped, with one cruiser and two destroyers reaching Vladivostok, and two auxiliary cruisers as well as one transport escaping back to Madagascar. Three cruisers were interned at Manila by the United States until the war was over. Eight auxiliaries and one destroyer were disarmed and remanded at Shanghai by China. Russian casualties were high, with more than 5,000 dead and 6,000 captured. The Japanese, who had lost no heavy ships, had 117 dead.

The loss of almost every heavy warship of the Baltic Fleet forced Russia to sue for peace, and the Treaty of Portsmouth was signed in September 1905, 340 years after the first battle against the Europeans in Battle of Fukuda Bay in 1565, the battle was hailed in Japan as one of the greatest naval victories in Japanese history, comparable to repelling the invading Kōryō (Mongol) fleets in 1274 (770 ships) and 1281 (900 ships). (Note: See Goryeo under Mongol rule#Mongol invasions of Japan and Kamikaze#Definition and origin for details.) Admiral Tōgō was revered as a national hero. (Note: He ended up being enshrined as a deity at Tōgō Shrine later in 1940, even though during his lifetime the admiral balked at the idea of being deified.) His flagship Mikasa has been preserved as a museum ship in Yokosuka Harbour.

== Background ==
=== Conflict in the Far East ===
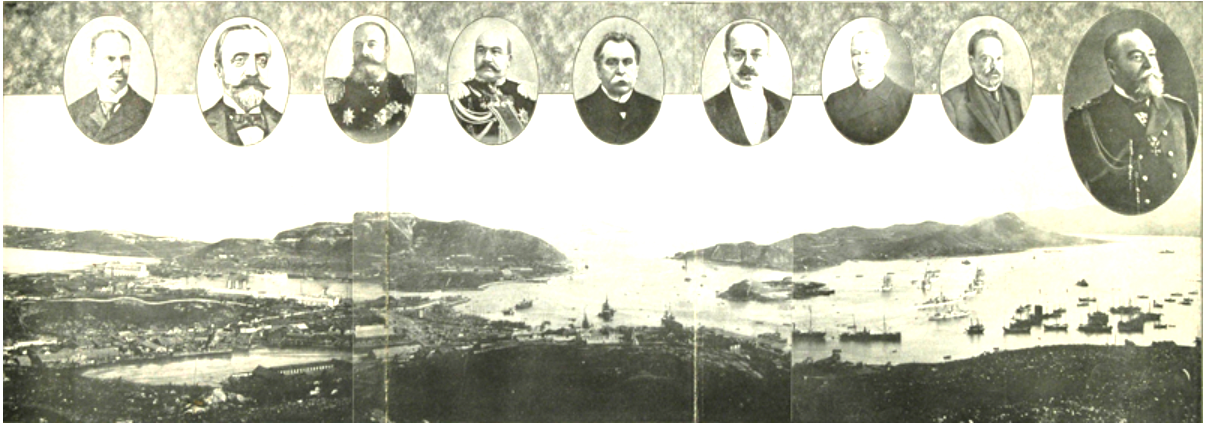
View of Port Arthur with Imperial Russian leaders. From left, Ambassador to China, Pavel Lessard; Ambassador to Japan, Roman Rosen; Minister of Navy, Theodor Avellan; Minister of Army, Vladimir Sakharov: Interior Minister, Vyacheslav von Plehve; Foreign Minister, Vladimir Lambsdorff; Prince Dmitry Khilkov; Finance Minister, Sergei Witte; Viceroy Yevgeni Alekseyev.

On 8 February 1904, destroyers of the Imperial Japanese Navy launched a surprise attack on the Russian Far East Fleet anchored in Port Arthur; three ships – two battleships and a cruiser – were damaged in the attack. The Russo-Japanese War had thus begun. Japan's first objective was to secure its lines of communication and supply to the Asian mainland, enabling it to conduct a ground war in Manchuria. To achieve this, it was necessary to neutralise Russian naval power in the Far East. At first, the Russian naval forces remained inactive and did not engage the Japanese, who staged unopposed landings in Korea. The Russians were revitalised by the arrival of Admiral Stepan Makarov and were able to achieve some degree of success against the Japanese, but on 13 April Makarov's flagship, the battleship Petropavlovsk, struck a mine and sank; Makarov was among the dead. His successors failed to challenge the Japanese Navy, and the remaining six Russian battleships (Note: Tsesarevich, Retvizan, Pobeda, Peresvet, Poltava and Sevastopol) and five armoured cruisers (Note: Askold, Pallada, Diana, Novik and Bayan) were effectively bottled up in their base at Port Arthur.

By May, the Japanese had landed forces on the Liaodong Peninsula and in August began the siege of the naval station. On 9 August, Admiral Wilgelm Vitgeft, commander of the 1st Pacific Squadron, was ordered to sortie his fleet to Vladivostok, link up with the Squadron stationed there, and then engage the Imperial Japanese Navy (IJN) in a decisive battle. Both squadrons of the Russian Pacific Fleet would ultimately become dispersed during the Battle of the Yellow Sea, where Admiral Vitgeft was killed by a salvo strike from the Japanese battleship Asahi on 10 August, and the Battle off Ulsan on 14 August 1904. What remained of Russian Pacific naval power would eventually be sunk in Port Arthur in December 1904.

=== Departure ===
With the inactivity of the First Pacific Squadron after the death of Admiral Makarov and the tightening of the Japanese noose around Port Arthur, the Russians considered sending part of their Baltic Fleet to the Far East. The plan was to relieve Port Arthur by sea, link up with the First Pacific Squadron, overwhelm the Imperial Japanese Navy, and then delay the Japanese advance into Manchuria until Russian reinforcements could arrive via the Trans-Siberian railroad and overwhelm the Japanese land forces there. As the situation in the Far East deteriorated, the Tsar (encouraged by his cousin Kaiser Wilhelm II), agreed to the formation of the Second Pacific Squadron. This would consist of five divisions of the Baltic Fleet, including 11 of its 13 battleships. The squadrons, including the later-formed Third Pacific Squadron, departed the Baltic ports of Reval (Tallinn) and Libau (Liepāja) on 15–16 October 1904 (Rozhestvensky fleet) (Note: von Fölkersahm, who had previously inherited the gunnery school of the Baltic Fleet from Rozhestvensky as the Commandant, led a group of smaller ships, departed Reval and Libau a few days later and split from Rozhestvensky group at Tangier to head for Suez Canal.) and 2 February 1905 (Nebogatov fleet), and on 3 November 1904 (protected cruisers Oleg and Izumrud, auxiliary cruisers Ural and Terek, destroyers Gromkiy and Grozniy (Note: According to Pleshakov (2002), Rion and Dniepr are included and Ural, Terek, Gromkiy and Grozniy are excluded from this unit. Hospital ship Kostroma departed from Odessa.) under the command of Captain 1st rank Leonid Dobrotvorsky.), numbering 48 ships and auxiliaries. (Note: The Baltic Fleet left Russia in four groups, commanded by Admiral Rozhestvensky, Rear Admiral von Fölkersahm, Rear Admiral Nebogatov, and Captain Leonid Dobrotvorsky. Later, illness incapacitated Fölkersahm and his eventual death just 3 days before the Battle of Tsushima promoted Rear Admiral Nobogatov to de facto Second in Command of the fleet.)

=== Dogger Bank ===
The Rozhestvensky and von Fölkersahm squadrons sailed through the Øresund Strait into the North Sea. The Russians had received numerous fictitious reports of Japanese torpedo boats operating in the area and were on high alert. In the Dogger Bank incident, the Rozhestvensky squadron mistook a group of British fishing trawlers operating near the Dogger Bank at night for hostile Japanese ships. The fleet fired upon the small civilian vessels, killing several British fishermen; one trawler was sunk, while another six were damaged. In confusion, the Russians even fired upon two of their own vessels, killing some of their own men. The firing continued for twenty minutes before Rozhestvensky ordered it to cease; loss of life was limited by the fact that the Russian gunnery was highly inaccurate. The British were outraged by the incident and incredulous that the Russians could mistake a group of fishing trawlers for Japanese warships, thousands of kilometres from the nearest Japanese port. Britain almost entered the war in support of Japan, with whom it had an alliance (but was neutral in the war, as their mutual defence clause stipulated "when either nation faced 'more than one' adversaries in a war"). The Royal Navy sortied and shadowed the Russian fleet until a diplomatic agreement was reached. France, which had hoped to eventually bring the British and Russians together in an anti-German bloc, intervened diplomatically to restrain Britain from declaring war. The Russians were forced to disembark officers (Note: Led by Rozhestvensky's staff officer, Captain 2nd rank Nikolai Klado, who, after his return to Saint Petersburg, strongly argued for reinforcement that led to the formation of the Third Pacific Squadron.) who were suspected of misconduct to give evidence to the International Court of Inquiry (Note: Initially proposed by the Russian Foreign Office after the news of Home Fleet, Channel Fleet and Mediterranean Fleet of the Royal Navy being mobilised.) at Paris, ultimately accepting responsibility for the incident and compensating the fishermen.

=== Routes ===
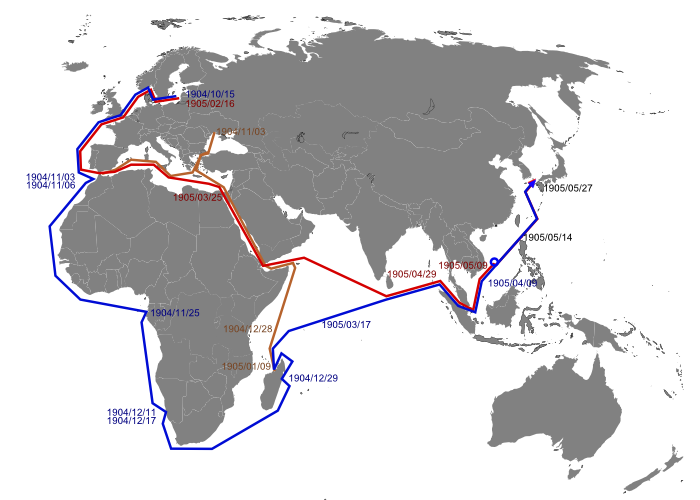
Routes taken by the Russian fleets from the Baltic to the Battle of Tsushima. Dobrotvorsky unit and Fölkersahm detachment in brown, Rozhestvensky fleet in blue, and Nebogatov's 3rd Pacific Squadron in red.

The draught of the newer battleships, which had proven to be considerably greater than designed, prevented their passage through the Suez Canal, (Note: Two hours after the initial departure still under tow, battleship Oryol, having a designed normal-load draught of 7.9 m (26 ft), got stuck aground on the fairway at the mouth of Kronstadt port, which had a 8.2 m (27 ft) depth, requiring dredgers to dig extra 0.46 m (1.5 ft). The Suez Canal had a draught limit of 6.7 m (22 ft) until 1956.) causing the fleet to separate after leaving Tangier on 3 November 1904. The newer battleships, cruisers, fast auxiliaries, and destroyers for protection proceeded around the Cape of Good Hope under the command of Admiral Rozhestvensky, while the older battleships and cruisers made their way through the Suez Canal under the command of Admiral von Fölkersahm. They planned to rendezvous in Madagascar, and both sections of the fleet completed this part of the voyage. The longer journey around Africa took a toll on the Russian crews under Rozhestvensky, "who had never experienced such a different climate or such a long time at sea" as "conditions on the ships deteriorated, and disease and respiratory issues killed a number of sailors". The voyage took half a year in rough seas, with difficulty obtaining coal for refueling – as the warships could not legally enter the ports of neutral nations – and the morale of the crews plummeted. The Russians needed 500,000 short tons (450,000 t) of coal and 30 to 40 re-coaling sessions to reach French Indochina (now Vietnam), and coal was provided by 60 colliers from the Hamburg-Amerika Line. (Note: 400,000 to 500,000 tons of coal was purchased by Russia at Cardiff in the UK after the beginning of this war, and was described by Sir George Clarke as "if the Russian fleet goes to the Far East (with) its motive power will be derived from British coal, mainly bought after the beginning of the war by a belligerent, which has made (the) coal absolute contraband". This explains why the Hamburg-Amerika Line refused to provide coaling beyond French Indochina, as the Japanese would be legally entitled to capture the German colliers carrying contraband for the Russians.) By April and May 1905 the reunited fleet had anchored at Cam Ranh Bay in French Indochina. (Note: The Hamburg-American Steamship Line refused to provide coaling beyond French Indochina.)

The Russians had been ordered to break the blockade of Port Arthur, but the Japanese land artillery sank the battleships in the port. The heavily fortified city/port had already fallen on 2 January, just after the Second Pacific Squadron arrived at Nossi Be, Madagascar, before the arrival of the Fölkersahm detachment. The objective was therefore shifted to linking up with the remaining Russian ships stationed in the port of Vladivostok, before bringing the Japanese fleet to battle.

== Prelude ==
Map of the Korea Strait and Tsushima Strait, either side of the Tsushima Islands.

The Russians had three possible routes to enter the Sea of Japan and reach Vladivostok: the longer were the La Pérouse Strait and Tsugaru Strait, on either side of Hokkaido. Admiral Rozhestvensky did not reveal his choice even to his subordinates until 25 May, when it became apparent he chose Tsushima by ordering the fleet to head northeast after detaching transports Yaroslavl, Vladimir, Kuronia, Voronezh, Livonia and Meteor as well as auxiliary cruisers Rion and Dniepr with the instruction to go to the near-by neutral port of Shanghai. The Tsushima Strait is the body of water eastward of the Tsushima Island, located midway between the Japanese island of Kyushu and the Korean Peninsula, the shortest and most direct route from Indochina. The other routes would have required the fleet to sail east around Japan. (Note: Auxiliary cruisers Terek and Kuban with a captured British transport Oldhamire (with Russian officers and some Russian crew) were sent East on 22 May as a diversion ploy to head for La Pérouse.) The Japanese Combined Fleet and the Russian Second and Third Pacific Squadrons, sent from the Baltic Sea now numbering 38, would fight in the strait between Korea and Japan on the East side of Tsushima Island.

Because of the 29,000 km (18,000 mi) journey, the Russian fleet was in a poor condition for battle. Apart from the four newest Borodino-class battleships, Admiral Nebogatov's 3rd Pacific Fleet consisted of older and poorly maintained warships. Overall, the Japanese side had a manoeuvrability advantage. The long voyage, combined with a lack of opportunity for maintenance, meant the Russian ships were heavily fouled, significantly reducing their speed. The Japanese 1st Battle Division could exceed 18 knots (33 km/h) and regularly manoeuvred at 15 knots, but the Russian fleet included warships with the maximum speed of 14 to 15 knots (with new engines/boilers, normal load, and clean hull) and the auxiliaries of 10–12 knots, that limited the fleet speed to 9 knots.

Tōgō's greatest advantage was that of experience, having five of the ten fleet commanders in the history of the Russian and Japanese navy with combat experience aboard modern warships on his side, (Note: Admirals Dewa (Battle of Port Arthur and Battle of the Yellow Sea), Kataoka (Battle of the Yellow Sea), Uryū (Battle of Chemulpo Bay), Kamimura (Battle of Port Arthur and Battle off Ulsan) and himself.) while Rozhestvensky had none. The other five were all Russian admirals whom Tōgō had defeated and not present for this battle, including Oskar Starck, who had been relieved of his command following his humiliating defeat in the Battle of Port Arthur; Admiral Stepan Makarov, killed by a mine off Port Arthur; Wilgelm Vitgeft, who had been killed in the Battle of the Yellow Sea; and Admiral (Prince) Pavel Ukhtomsky who was relieved and recalled to Mukden. Admiral Karl Jessen, who experienced the Battle off Ulsan, remained in Vladivostok.

Additionally, there were significant deficiencies in the Russian naval fleet's equipment and training. Russian naval tests with their torpedoes exposed major technological failings. (Note: In one such trial, of the seven torpedoes fired, one jammed in the tube, two veered ninety degrees to port, one went ninety degrees to starboard, two kept a steady course but went wide of the mark, and the last went round in circles 'popping up and down like a porpoise', causing panic throughout the fleet.")

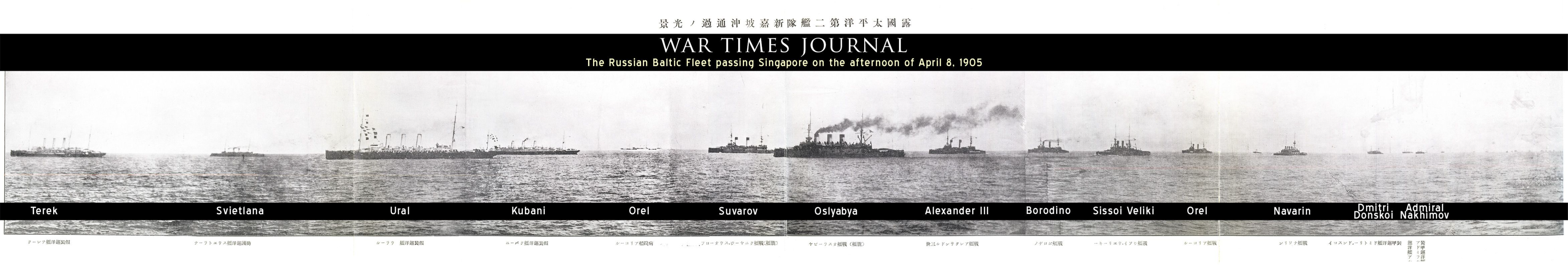
View of the Russian Second Pacific Squadron passing the Singapore Strait on 8 April 1905.

== Battle ==
=== First contact ===
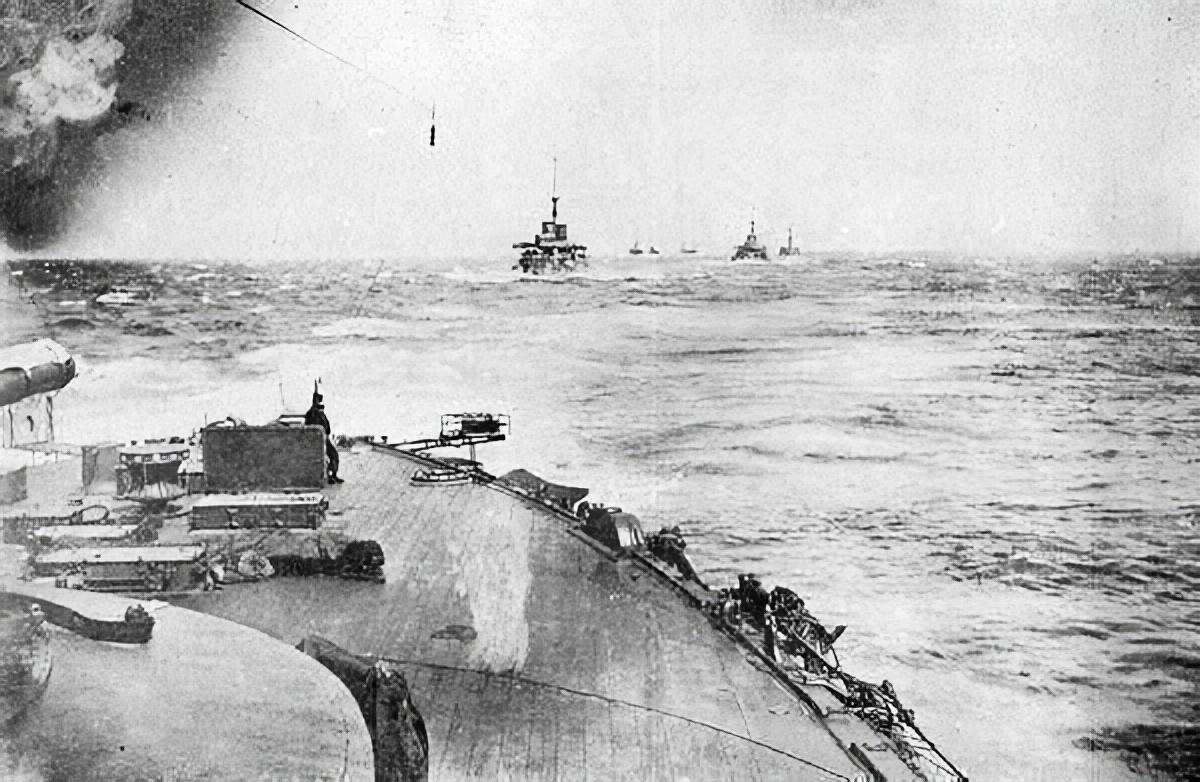
Departure of the Japanese Combined Fleet in the morning of 27 May 1905

Because the Russians wanted to slip undetected into Vladivostok, they approached Japanese waters in radio silence. They steered outside regular shipping channels to reduce the chance of detection. On the night of 26 May 1905, the Russian fleet approached the Tsushima Strait.

In the night, thick fog blanketed the straits, giving the Russians an advantage. At 02:45 on 27 May Japan Standard Time (JST), the Japanese auxiliary cruiser Shinano Maru observed three lights on what appeared to be a vessel on the distant horizon and closed to investigate. These lights were from the Russian hospital ship Orel, (Note: Battleship Oryol and the hospital ship Orel had the same name Орёл in Russian, meaning "Eagle". As two different spellings have traditionally been used in English for this Russian word, this article uses "Oryol" for the battleship and "Orel" for the hospital ship for clarity.) which, in compliance with the rules of war, had continued to burn them. At 04:30, Shinano Maru approached the vessel, noting that she carried no guns and appeared to be an auxiliary. The Orel mistook the Shinano Maru for another Russian vessel and did not attempt to notify the fleet. Instead, she signaled to Shinano Maru in Russian code, which made no sense to the Japanese ship. The Shinano Maru then sighted the shapes of ten other Russian ships in the mist.

Wireless telegraphy played an important role from the start. At 04:55, Captain Narikawa of the Shinano Maru sent a message to the Combined Fleet command onboard Mikasa in Masampo that the "Enemy is in grid 203". By 05:00, intercepted radio signals informed the Russians that they had been discovered and that Japanese scouting cruisers were shadowing them. Admiral Tōgō received the message at 05:05 and immediately began to prepare his battle fleet for a sortie.

=== Beginning of the battle ===
Routes of the Russian and Japanese fleets on 27–28 May 1905

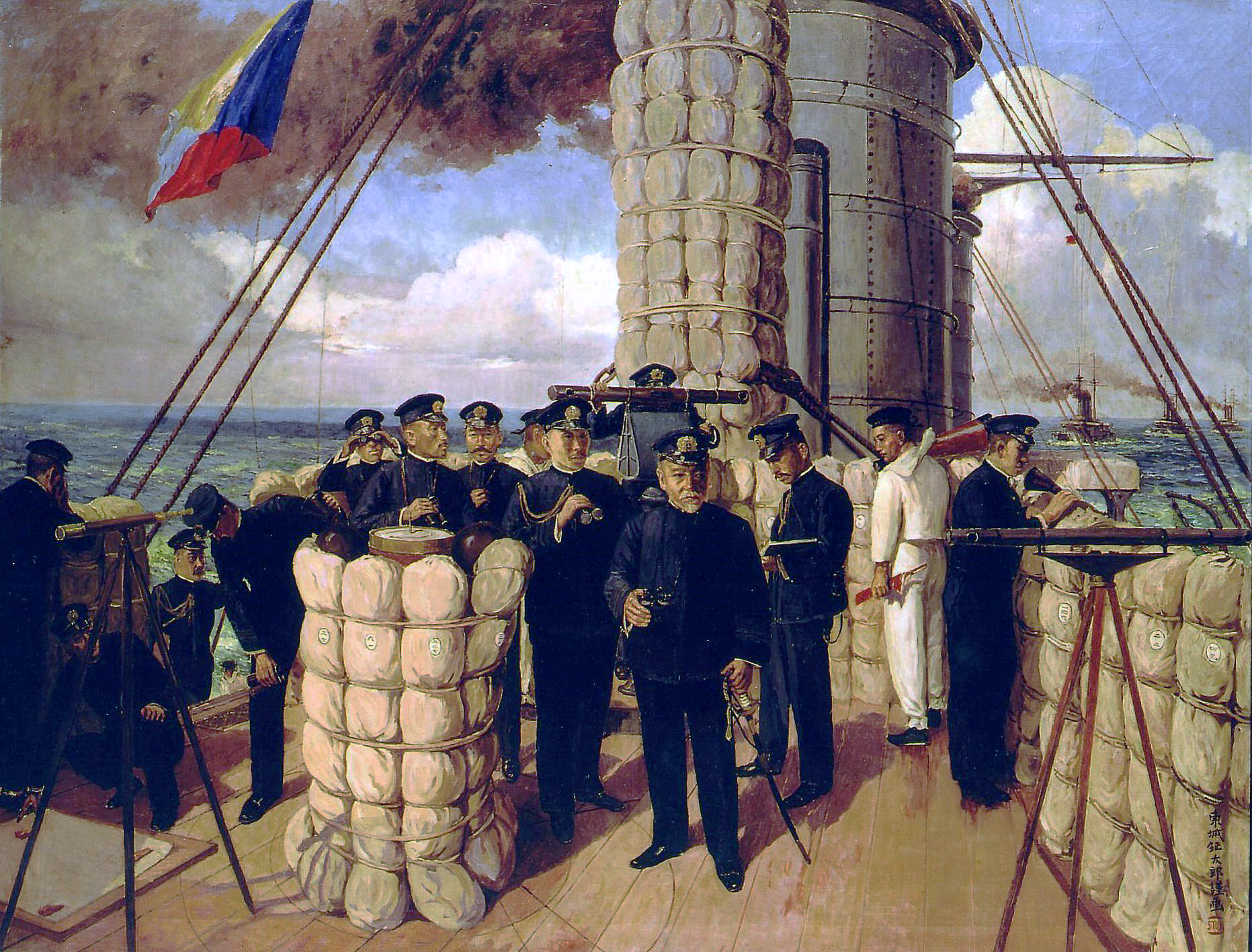
Painting by Tōjō Shōtarō depicting Admiral Tōgō on the "Compass Deck" above the bridge of Mikasa at the start of the battle. The signal flag being hoisted represents the letter Z, a special instruction to his fleet. (Note: This painting shows Tōgō wearing a sword. In reality, it was prohibited for any officer to wear a sword on this deck for its effect on compass reading. The cushion-like coverings on the naval compass turret (Note: Replica of this compass can be seen on battleship Mikasa in Yokosuka. The original is displayed at Munakata Taisha shrine (Note: 33.8308°N 130.5154°E) in Kyūshū where the compass was dedicated as an oblation for the three daughter goddesses of god of mariners after this battle as the symbol of guiding the Combined Fleet.) and side railings are rolled sailor hammocks (rolled canvas awnings on the mast) as a part of the "prepare for battle" procedure to reduce the risk posed by shrapnel.)

At 06:34, before departing with the Combined Fleet, Admiral Tōgō wired a message to the navy minister in Tokyo:

In response to the report that enemy ships have been sighted, the Combined Fleet will immediately commence action and attempt to attack and destroy them. Weather today fine but high waves.

The final sentence of this telegram has become famous in Japanese military history, and has been quoted by former Japanese Prime Minister Shinzō Abe.

The entire Japanese fleet was put to sea, with Tōgō in his flagship Mikasa leading over 40 vessels to meet the Russians. Meanwhile, the shadowing Japanese scouting vessels sent wireless reports every few minutes as to the formation and course of the Russian fleet. There was mist, which reduced visibility, and the weather was poor. Wireless gave the Japanese an advantage; in his report on the battle, Admiral Tōgō noted the following:

Though a heavy fog covered the sea, making it impossible to observe anything at a distance of over 8.0 km (5 mi), [through wireless messaging] all the conditions of the enemy were as clear to us, who were a 48–64 km (30–40 mi) distant, as though they had been under our very eyes.

At 13:40, both fleets sighted each other, ready to engage. At around 13:55, Tōgō ordered the hoisting of the Z flag, issuing a predetermined announcement to the entire fleet:

The Empire's fate depends on the result of this battle, let every man do his utmost duty.

=== Daylight action ===
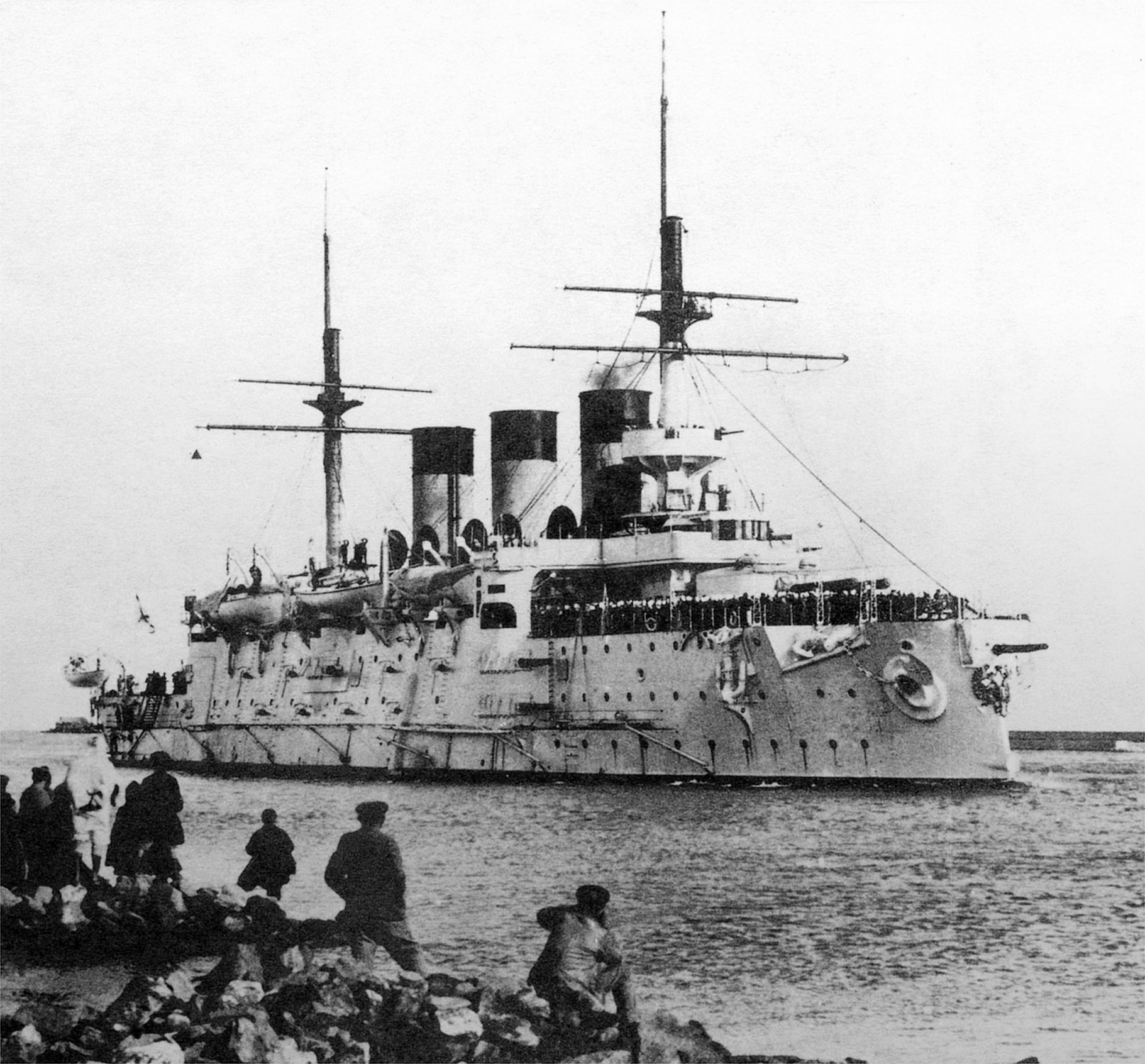
Russian battleship Oslyabya, the first warship sunk in the battle

The Russians sailed from south-southwest to north-northeast; "continuing to a point of intersection which allowed only their bow guns to bear; enabling him [Tōgō] to throw most of the Russian batteries successively out of bearing." The Japanese fleet steamed from northeast to southwest, then Tōgō ordered the fleet to turn 180-degrees in sequence, which enabled his ships to take the same course as the Russians. Rozhestvensky had only two alternatives, "a charge direct, in line abreast", or to commence "a formal pitched battle." He chose the latter, and at 14:08, the Japanese flagship Mikasa was hit at about 7,000 metres, with the Japanese replying at 6,400 metres. Although Tōgō's U-turn was successful, Russian gunnery had proven surprisingly good, and the flagship Mikasa was hit 15 times in five minutes. Before the end of the engagement, she was struck 15 more times by large-calibre shells. The Japanese fleet then steamed at 15 knots; the Russian at 11 in parallel engagement. Superior Japanese gunnery took its toll, with most of the Russian battleships being crippled in thirty minutes.

Captain 2nd Rank Vladimir Semenoff, a Russian staff officer aboard the flagship Knyaz Suvorov, said, "It seemed impossible even to count the number of projectiles striking us. Shells seemed to be pouring upon us incessantly one after another. The steel plates and superstructure on the upper decks were torn to pieces, and the splinters caused many casualties. Iron ladders were crumpled up into rings, guns were literally hurled from their mountings. In addition to this, there was the unusually high temperature and liquid flame of the explosion, which seemed to spread over everything. I actually watched a steel plate catch fire from a burst."

Ninety minutes into the battle, the first warship to be sunk was the Russian battleship Oslyabya from Rozhestvensky's 2nd Battleship division. (Note: According to Semenoff, a rescued officer of Oslyabya said later on destroyer Buyniy, "it was three Japanese shells accidentally hitting nearly the same spot on the waterline below the forward turret, creating a huge hole that caused the hull to almost heel over on the spot and settled under-water" that sunk Oslyabya.) This was the first time a modern armoured warship had been sunk by gunfire alone.

By 14:45, Tōgō had "crossed the Russian T", enabling him to fire broadsides, while the Russians could reply only with their forward turrets.

A direct hit on the Russian battleship Borodino's magazines by the Japanese battleship Fuji caused her to explode, which sent smoke thousands of metres into the air and trapped all but one (Note: Spotter, foreman Semyon Semyonovich Yushchin, who swam out of a casemate, held onto a floating debris, and was picked up by Japanese destroyer Oboro in the night.) of her crew onboard as she sank. Rozhestvensky was knocked out of action by a shell fragment that struck his skull. In the evening, Rear Admiral Nikolai Nebogatov took over command of the Russian fleet. The Russians lost the battleships Knyaz Suvorov, Oslyabya, Imperator Aleksandr III and Borodino. The Japanese ships suffered only light damage.

=== Night attacks ===
At night, around 20:00, 21 destroyers and 45 Japanese torpedo boats (Note: 21 destroyers and 31 torpedo boats of the Combined Fleet, 4 torpedo boats from Kure Naval District, and 10 torpedo boats from Takeshiki Guard District.) were thrown against the Russians. (Note: After the war, Admiral Rozhestvensky was asked in a Russian court martial why he chose day time to pass the most dangerous zone of Tsushima Strait. His answer was "Because torpedo boats at night are a greater risk for battleships.") They were deployed initially from the north, east, and west while being slightly visible, forcing the Russians, roughly in the order of cruisers, battleships, and auxiliary groups, to turn west. The Japanese were aggressive, continuing their attacks for three hours without a break; as a result, during the night, there were several collisions between the small craft and Russian warships. (Note: Lighthouses at the North-end ("Mitsushima Lighthouse" (in Japanese).) and the South-end ("Kousaki Lighthouse" (in Japanese).) of Tsushima were lit to indicate the borders of the area on the East side of Tsushima Island in which destroyers and torpedo boats are ordered to be free to attack any larger-than-destroyer ship in the dark.) The Russians were dispersed in small groups. By 23:00, it appeared that the Russians had vanished, but they revealed their positions to their pursuers by switching on their searchlights – ironically, the searchlights had been turned on to spot the attackers. The old battleship Navarin struck chained floating mines (Note: The composition of Shimose Powder, director-controlled salvo firing, the use of Ijuin Fuse and the shells not being armour-penetrating/delayed-detonation, and this chained floating mines on the Japanese side, and Makarov Tip, the death of Rear Admiral von Fölkersahm, which strait the fleet was headed going into the Sea of Japan, and the use of Barr and Stroud rangefinders by Oslyabya and Navarin on the Russian side were top secrets at the time. Most of the official records were not kept on these items.) laid in front of her and was forced to stop to avoid pushing the chain forward, inviting other floating mines on the chain to hit her. She was consequently torpedoed four times and sunk. Out of a crew of 622, only three survived, one to be rescued by the Japanese and the other two by a British merchant ship.

The battleship Sissoi Veliky was badly damaged by a torpedo in the stern and was scuttled the next day. Two old armoured cruisers – Admiral Nakhimov and Vladimir Monomakh – were badly damaged, the former by a torpedo hit to the bow, the latter by colliding with a Japanese destroyer. They were both scuttled by their crews the next morning off Tsushima Island, where they headed while taking on water. The night attacks placed a great strain on the Russians, as they lost two battleships and two armoured cruisers, while the Japanese lost only three torpedo boats.

=== XGE signal and Russian surrender ===
At 05:23 on 28 May, what remained of the Russian fleet was sighted heading northeast. Tōgō's battleships proceeded to surround Nebogatov's remaining squadron south of the island of Takeshima and commenced main battery fire at 12,000 meters. The Russian cruiser Izumrud then turned southeast and started to flee. Realising that his guns were outranged by at least one thousand metres, (Note: Oryol had lost its front left main gun, and the rear left gun could no longer be raised to extended-range elevations, (Note: See Russian battleship Oryol#Construction and career) meaning that only four 12-inch guns were left in the fleet: two older black-powder firing (shorter range) guns on Imperator Nikolai I, and two longer-range guns on the damaged Oryol that had however lost both of its rangefinders.) and the Japanese battleships had proven on the day before to be faster than his own so that he could not close the distance if he tried, Nebogatov ordered the four battleships remaining under his command to surrender. (Note: During Nebogatov's court martial, his defense for surrendering his battle fleet was that the Japanese guns outranged his guns.) (Note: In retrospect, the Japanese main 12" guns outranged his shorter-range 12" Krupp guns by 8000 metres and the longer-range 1895-issue 12" guns by about 3000 metres. See the Gun range and rate of fire section for details. The Japanese fleet had 14 (out of 16) of the 12" Armstrong guns operational on the four main battleships at the time.) XGE, an international signal of surrender, was hoisted; however, the Japanese navy continued to fire as they did not have "surrender" in their code books and had to find one that did hastily. Still under heavy fire, Nebogatov then ordered a white tablecloth sent up the masthead, but Tōgō, having faced the difficult decision to sink a British transport ship full of Chinese soldiers during the First Sino-Japanese War as the commander of IJN cruiser Naniwa, (Note: See Battle of Pungdo#Kowshing Incident for details of this incident on 25 July 1894. He had suffered from pneumonia and was taken off duty for 3 years from 1887 before the Sino-Japanese War. He utilised the time to research and became an expert in international law. Japan had just signed the Anglo-Japanese Treaty of Commerce and Navigation with the UK on 16 July 1894. His decision to sink the British ship (carrying contraband, flying the British civilian ensign) after a boarding inspection, maritime capture, and a demand to abandon ship was later defended in a newspaper editorial by a British jurist as compliant with admiralty law. He also experienced the Chinese cruiser Jiyuan fleeing from the Battle of Pungdo after raising a white flag and the Japanese naval ensign.) knew the signal meant a request for a truce or parley, not 'surrender' in the legal definition, and that either meaning contradicted not stopping the ships.

His lieutenants found the codebook, which included the XGE signal, and reported that engine shutdown was required for the signal. Since all the Russian ships were still moving, he continued firing while the response flag signal "STOP" was hoisted. Nebogatov then ordered St. Andrew's Cross lowered and the Japanese national flag raised on the gaff and all engines stopped. Seeing the requirement for the signal met, Tōgō gave the cease-fire and accepted Nebogatov's surrender. Nebogatov surrendered, knowing that he could be shot for doing so. He said to his men:

You are young, and it is you who will one day retrieve the honour and glory of the Russian Navy. The lives of the two thousand four hundred men in these ships are more important than mine.

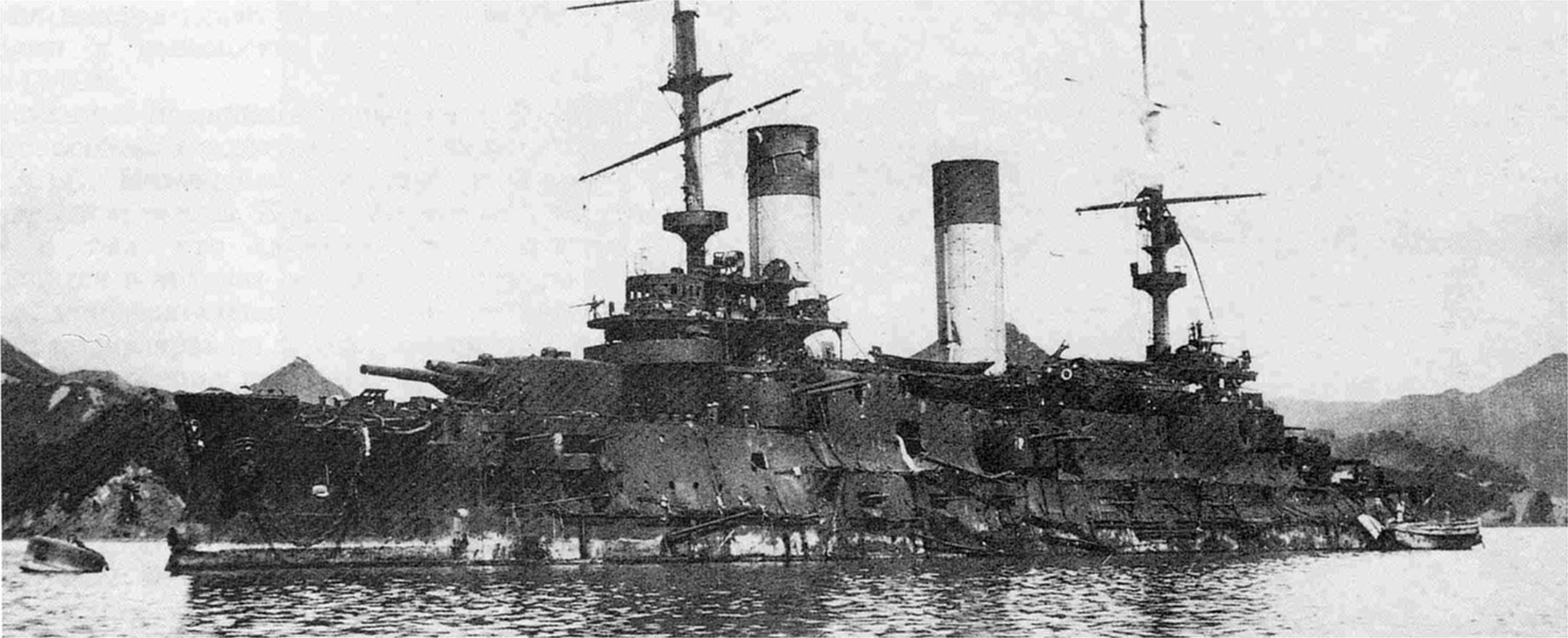
Damaged Oryol at Maizuru Naval Arsenal (Note: 35.4808°N 135.3743°E)

As an example of the level of damage inflicted on a Russian battleship, Oryol was hit by five 12-inch, nine 8-inch, 39 six-inch, and 21 smaller or unidentified shells. (Note: See Russian battleship Oryol#Construction and career for details. Due to her position in the Russian formation being the last in line of four Borodino-class battleships, Oryol probably received the least number of large calibre shells and possibly the most number of small calibre hits among the four.) This damage caused her to list, and the engine ceased to operate when she was being taken by the Japanese navy to the First Battle Division home port of Sasebo in Nagasaki after Tōgō accepted the surrender. Cruiser Asama and then battleship Asahi had to tow Oryol, and their destination was changed to the closer Maizuru Naval Arsenal to avoid losing the prize of war. Her commander, Captain Yung, who was seriously injured on 27 May, died in the night of the 29th onboard battleship Asahi en route. (Note: Oryol's officers and most of the crew were taken aboard battleship Asahi, which towed and then accompanied Oryol, after her engines were temporarily repaired, to Maizuru. The Burial at sea was conducted for Captain Nikolay Viktorovich Yung at 07:30 on 30 May 1905 onboard Asahi, all hands on the fore-deck with all Russians and Japanese lined up. Half-mast was flown on battleships Asahi, Oryol and cruiser Asama. After the funeral, a piece of cardboard with "35°56'13"North, 135°10'East" written on, was given by a Japanese officer to the junior navigator, Lieutenant Leonid Larionov who was personally close to the captain from his childhood.)

=== Capture of Rozhestvensky ===
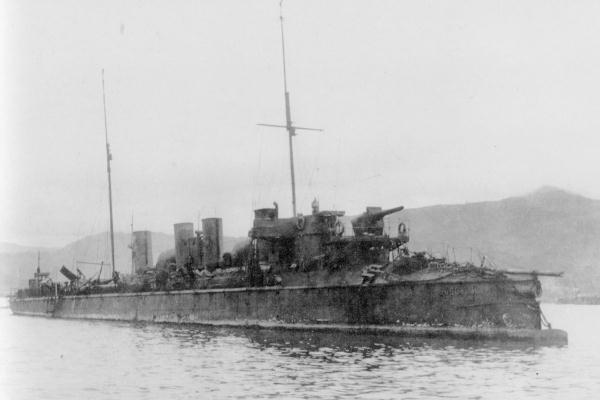
Captured Russian destroyer Byedoviy at Sasebo on 3 June 1905 (Note: 33.1618°N 129.7005°E) before she became IJN Satsuki.

Russian destroyer Buyniy, after rescuing the squadron command including Admiral Rozhestvensky from the burning Knyaz Suvorov at 17:30 during the day battle on the 27th, found cruiser Donskoi, destroyers Byedoviy and Grozniy in convoy on the morning of 28 May. Rozhestvensky chose Byedoviy to move the fleet command officers and himself, as Buyniy had sustained serious damage, and Donskoi, being an old ship, was very slow. (Later in the afternoon, Buyniy was sunk by gunfire from Donskoi after taking the crew aboard.) Leaving the struggling Buyniy and the slow Donskoi (Note: Buiniy had boiler and screw propeller troubles, 20-years-old sail-rig-equipped Donskoi could not exceed 13 knots.) behind, Byedoviy and Grozniy headed for Vladivostok.

Japanese destroyers Sazanami and Kagerō had mechanical issues during the night battle on the 27th and had to fix the problems at the Port of Ulsan. (Note: where destroyer tender / torpedo boat depot ship with repair equipment/personnel Kasuga Maru was.) Both destroyers finished their temporary repair work by the morning of the 28th and left the port together. They spotted the two Russian destroyers on the way to join the rest of the Combined Fleet and engaged at 15:25. (Note: Lieutenant Tsukamoto Katsukuma, onboard Sazanami, who spotted the Russian destroyers at 14:15, used to be assigned to Mikasa. He had seen Admiral Tōgō many times and admired the state-of-the-art binoculars (Note: Carl Zeiss 1904 Marine-Glas m.Revolver zwei Vergrößerungen x5 und x10 "Battleship Mikasa and Zeiss Binoculars" (in Japanese).) used by the admiral. He spent 350 Yen (equivalent to one year's Lieutenant salary) of personal funds to purchase the same model, and the binoculars had reached him stationed at Tsushima from the agent in Tōkyō before this battle.)

Destroyer Grozniy increased speed being chased by Kagerō, but Byedoviy slowed down and stopped in the face of firing and approaching Sazanami while raising a white flag. (Note: According to Novikov-Priboy, Byedoviy raised a white table cloth on the foremast, Red Cross flag on the rear mast, and had lowered the Saint Andrew's Cross from the stern flag pole, by the instruction of the Flag Captain Clapier de Colongue (the most senior officer onboard the destroyer after the injured admiral, outranking the ship commander Captain 2nd rank Nikolai Baranov), who reasoned Byedoviy had become a hospital ship.) Grozniy was able to keep sufficient distance from Kagerō, exchanging just a few long-distance shots at about 18:30, before nightfall. She became one of the three warships reaching Vladivostok after surviving the battle.

The Combined Fleet command could not believe the news when cruiser Akashi, which rendezvoused Sazanami on the morning of the next day, sent a radio telegraph message about the capture of Admiral Rozhestvensky, as they were certain to have sunk Knyaz Suvorov and assumed the squadron commander went down with the flagship. But cruiser Akashi, accompanied by Sazanami and Kagerō, arrived at Sasebo port in the morning of 30 May with Byedoviy in tow, with not only the injured admiral but also the surviving members of the Russian fleet command onboard. (Note: Admiral Rozhestvensky was saved with his staff, the Flag Captain Konstantin Clapier de Colongue, Flag Navigation Officer Filipinoffsky, Captain 2nd rank Vladimir Semenoff, and Flag-Lieutenant Leontieff, Surgeon Pyotr Kudinoff, flag officers Krzhizhanovsky, Demchinsky and cadet Maksimov, staff clerk Matizen and admiral's messenger Pyotr Poochkoff, together with 13 other Suvorov crew who jumped onto the destroyer during the rescue. (Note: Destroyer Buyniy, after saving over 130 Oslyabya crew in the water, made a heroic rescue of the injured Admiral Rozhestvensky and his staff from the destroyed and burning battleship Knyaz Suvorov at 17:30 on 27 May, but she suffered severe damage in doing so. Admiral Rozhestvensky and the staff were transferred to the destroyer Byedoviy before she was abandoned and sunk.))

=== Conclusion ===
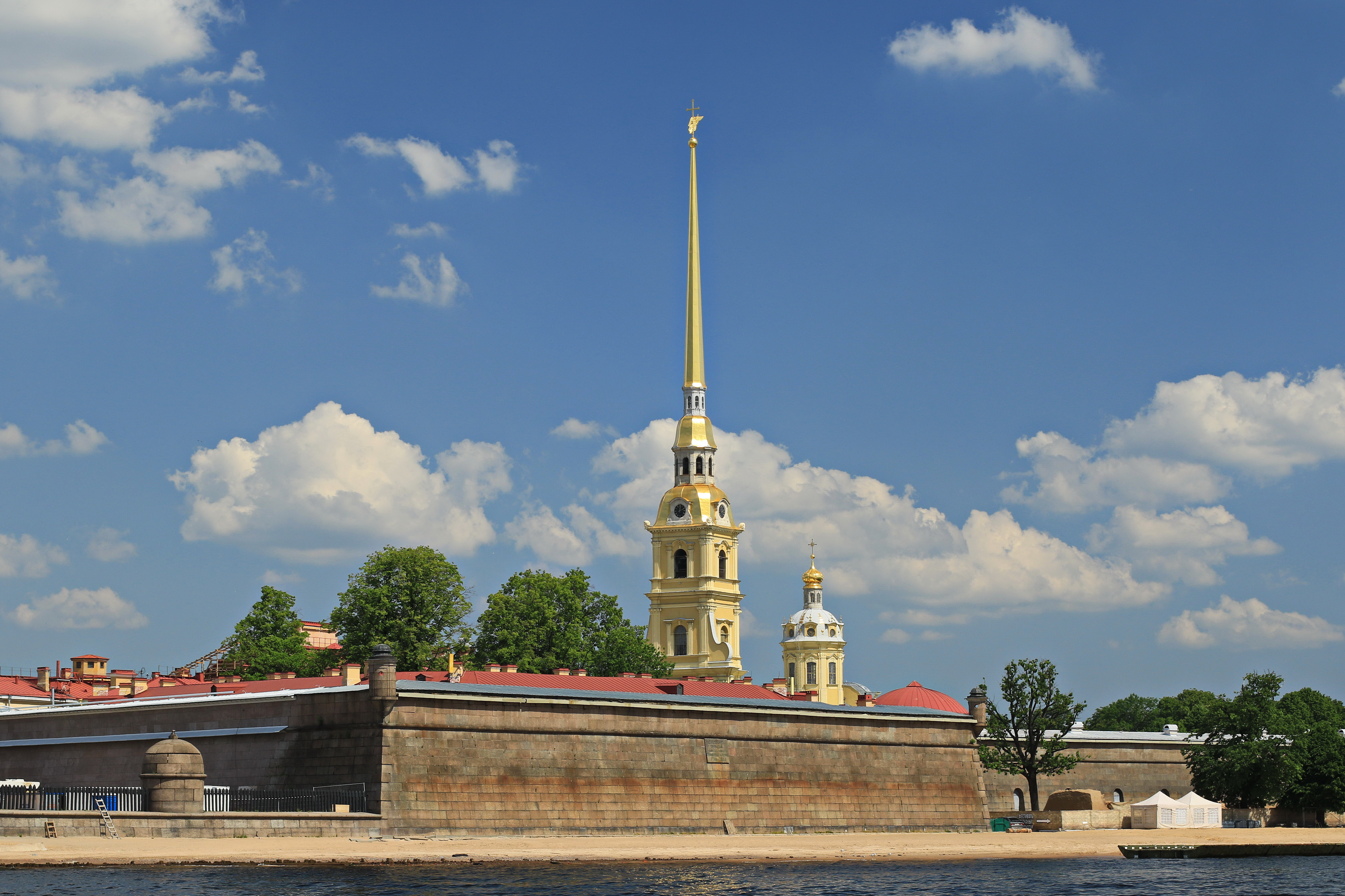
Walls outside the Trubetskoy Bastion Prison (Note: 59.9485°N 30.3133°E) of Peter and Paul fortress in Saint Petersburg for high-value political criminals where Admiral Nebogatov was kept. Russian cruiser Aurora is displayed 1km away (Note: 59.9554°N 30.3378°E) from this fortress.

Until the evening of 28 May, the Japanese pursued isolated Russian ships until almost all were destroyed or captured. The cruiser Izumrud, which escaped from the Japanese despite being present at Nebogatov's surrender, was destroyed by her crew after running aground on the Siberian coast.

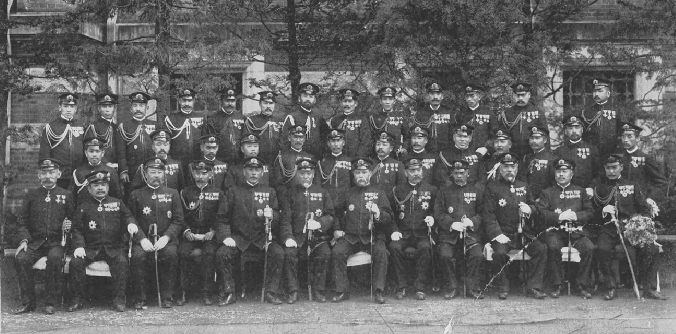
Imperial Japanese Navy admirals and staff on 22 October 1905 at the Navy victory celebration ceremony after the war. (Note: On the front row, 3rd from the left to right; Chief medical officer (M.D., Admiral) Saneyoshi Yasuzumi, Admirals Ijuin Gorō, Kamimura Hikonojō, Tōgō Heihachirō, Navy Minister (Admiral) Yamamoto Gonnohyōe, Head of Navy General Staff (Admiral) Itō Sukeyuki, Admirals Kataoka Shichirō, Dewa Shigetō, Under Secretary of Navy (Admiral) Saitō Makoto, Head of Planning Dept. of Navy Ministry (Admiral) Yamashita Gentarō. Admirals Uryū Sotokichi, Misu Sōtarō (who lost an eye in the battle), Taketomi Kunikane, Tōgō Masamichi, Yamada Hikohachi, Shimamura Hayao, and Ogura Byōichirō also participated in the battle. See Battle of Tsushima order of battle for the responsibilities of the admirals during this battle.) A naval review was carried out for Emperor Meiji on 23 October 1905 in Tokyo Bay.

The wounded Admiral Rozhestvensky went to the Imperial Japanese Naval Hospital in Sasebo to recover from a head injury caused by shrapnel; there, the victorious Admiral Tōgō visited him personally in plain clothes, (Note: There have been numerous imaginary pictures of this visit drawn in Russia and in Japan with Tōgō in Navy uniform, but they seem fictional.) comforting him with kind words: "Defeat is a common fate of a soldier. There is nothing to be ashamed of in it. The great point is whether we have performed our duty." Rozhestvensky was allowed to send a telegram to the Tsar at Tsarskoye Selo.

On 10 June 1905, Tsar Nicholas II responded with a telegram:

Tokyo. Adjutant General Rozhdestvensky. From the bottom of my heart I thank you and all the ranks of the squadron who honestly fulfilled their duty in battle, for their selfless service to Russia. Your feat was destined to be crowned with success, but your fatherland will always be proud of your selfless courage. I wish you a speedy recovery, and may God console you all. Nikolai

Rozhestvensky and other officers were placed on trial in August 1905 after returning to Russia. Rozhestvensky claimed full responsibility for the fiasco and was sentenced to death, but the Tsar commuted his death sentence. Flag captains Clapier de Colongue (Second Pacific Squadron) and Cross (Third Pacific Squadron), Staff officers Filippinovsky and Leontieff, together with the commanders of the surrendered battleships, Captains Vladimir Smirnov (Nikolai I), Nikolai Lishin (Note: Lishin, who had earned the Cross of St. George for bravery four times, volunteered and served in the Army after his release as a low-rank soldier during World War I and was noticed by Nicholas II during an inspection. The Tsar reinstated his Navy rank, and Lishin was assigned to the Second Baltic Fleet as a Captain in August 1915.) (Apraksin), Sergei Grogoryev (Senyavin), and the Byedoviy commander Nikolai Baranov were sentenced to 10 years in prison and dismissed from service (Nicholas II pardoned them on 1 May 1909). The executive officer of Oryol (who was in charge of the ship at the surrender), Captain 2nd rank K.L. Schwede, and other officers were acquitted.

Admiral Nebogatov, who surrendered the fleet, was also sentenced to death, which was commuted to 10 years imprisonment and eventually pardoned by the Tsar. (Note: According to the Russian Wikipedia, Rear Admiral Oskar Adolfovich Enqvist, who was a cousin of the Navy Minister Teodor (Fyodor) Avellan, avoided being prosecuted. He was honorably discharged (retired) from the Imperial Russian Navy on 19 November 1907 with the rank of Vice Admiral.) He was released from the Trubetskoy Bastion prison in Peter and Paul Fortress in May 1909.

Following this battle, the Imperial Japanese Navy grew to the third largest in the world after World War I. (Note: behind the Royal Navy and the US Navy. See Imperial Japanese Navy#Towards an autonomous national navy (1905–1914).) Tōgō Heihachirō was appointed to Order of Merit by King Edward VII on 21 February 1906, as one of the three first non-Dominion members, (Note: See List of members of the Order of Merit.) before he was enobled as Earl (Count) by Emperor Meiji in 1907. Later, he became the first Japanese person on the cover of Time magazine for the 8 November 1926 issue.

== Contributing factors ==
=== Commander and crew experience ===
Admiral Rozhestvensky faced a more combat-experienced battleship admiral in Tōgō Heihachirō. Admiral Tōgō had already killed two Russian admirals: Stepan Makarov outside of Port Arthur in the battleship Petropavlovsk in April 1904, then Wilgelm Vitgeft in his battleship Tsesarevich in August of the same year. Before those two deaths, Tōgō had chased Admiral Oskar Starck, also flying his flag in the Petropavlovsk, off the battlefield. Admiral Tōgō and his men had two battleship fleet action experiences, which amounted to over four hours of combat experience in battleship-to-battleship combat at Port Arthur and the Yellow Sea. The Japanese fleets had practiced gunnery extensively since the beginning of the war, using sub-calibre practice guns (Note: Large-calibre long-barrel rifle with special mounts to be centered in the bore) mounted in their larger guns. (Note: During the 11 days from 28 March to 7 April 1905, Mikasa had 5 days with gunnery training sessions. In these 5 days, Mikasa fired 9,066 rounds of practice ammunition.) (Note: As an indication of unusually high level of gunnery training Tōgō applied to the fleet, the Maizuru Naval Arsenal requested an increase in 1905 fiscal year budget for additional 40,000 rounds of sub-calibre practice ammunition on 17 May 1905 for Mikasa, 34,000 rounds for cruiser Nisshin, 1,000 rounds per gun for destroyer Sazanami, among others, as they depleted annual allocations merely one and a half months into the fiscal year (Fiscal years begin on 1 April). These requests were all approved by the Fleet Management Dept. of the Naval Ministry for the entire fleet.) (Note: The Russian 2nd Pacific Squadron departed Libau with a small supply of sub-calibre practice ammunition. The transport Irtysh was loaded with additional practice ammunition for the squadron but was delayed in departing due to an accident and was left behind at Libau for repairs. The Russian Admiralty decided to unload the ammunition, send it via the Trans-Siberian railroad to Vladivostok, and reload the ship with coal, without notifying Rozhestvensky (who was promoted to rear admiral on the strength of founding the gunnery training school of the Baltic Fleet.), who learned about the decision after reaching Madagascar. The squadron conducted four practice sessions each at Nosy Be and Cam Ranh Bay.)

In contrast, Russian battleship Borodino underwent sea trials from 23 August to 13 September 1904 as a brand new ship upon her completion, and the new crew did not have much time for training before she set sail for the Pacific on 15 October 1904. Borodino's sister ship, Knyaz Suvorov, started trials on 9 August, Oryol started trials the latest on 10 September 1904, leaving Imperator Aleksandr III (the trials finished in October 1903) as the only Borodino-class ship actually ready for deployment. (Note: See the articles on Russian battleship Knyaz Suvorov, Russian battleship Oryol, and Russian battleship Imperator Aleksandr III (1901).) As the Imperial Russian Navy planned on building 10 Borodino-class battleships (5 were ultimately built) with the requirement for thousands of additional crewmen, the basic training, quality, and experience of the crew and cadets were far lower than those onboard the battleships in the seasoned Pacific Fleet.

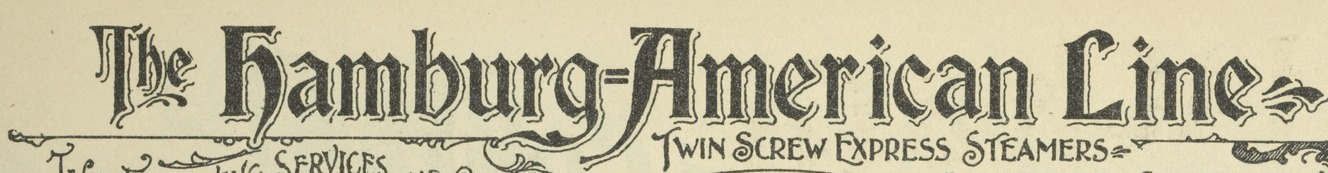

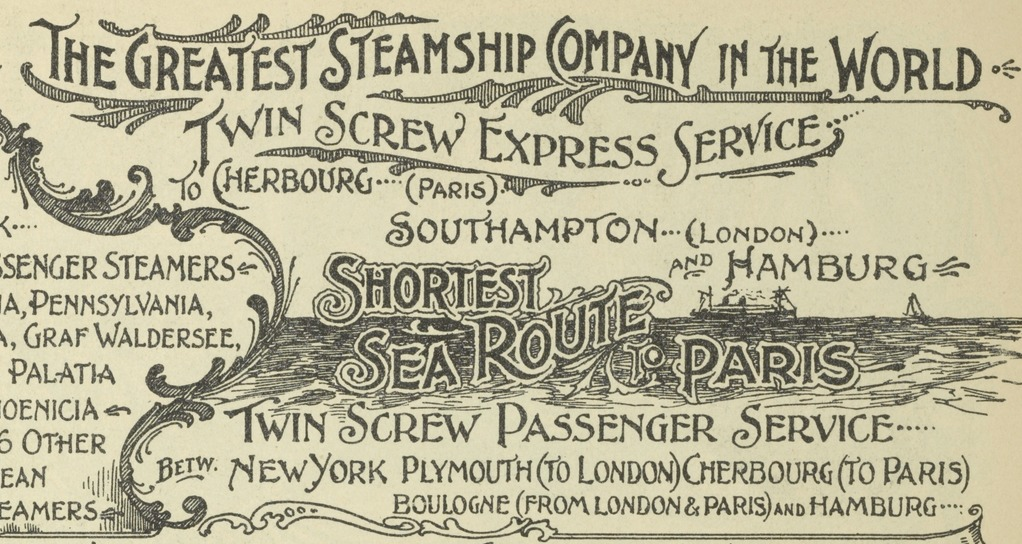
1899 ad in The Mail and Express of New York

The Imperial Russian Admiralty Council (Адмиралтейств-совет) and the rest of the Admiralty were quite aware of this disadvantage, and opposed the September dispatch plan (Note: The official departure date from Kronstadt was 11 September 1904.) for the following reasons:

1. The Japanese navy has completed the battle preparations with all the crew having some combat experience.

2. The long voyage is mostly through extreme tropical weather, so a meaningful training is practically impossible on the way.

3. Therefore, the newly created Second Pacific Fleet should conduct training in the Baltic until the next spring while waiting for the rigging of another battleship, Slava, (Note: Launched on 29 August 1903. Commissioned in October 1905. The last of Borodino-class ships.) and the purchase of Chilean and Argentine warships. (Note: See #British support)

However, at the council in the imperial presence on 23 August 1904 held at the Peterhof Grand Palace, this opinion was overruled by Admiral Rozhestvensky (Commander in Chief of the Fleet), Navy Minister Avellan, and Tsar Nicholas II; for it was deemed impossible to re-arrange the massive coaling for the long voyage if the navy broke the contract that was already signed with Hamburg-American Steamship Line of Germany.

=== Salvo firing director system ===
Up to the Battle of the Yellow Sea on 10 August 1904, naval guns were controlled locally by a gunnery officer assigned to that gun or a turret. He specified the elevation and deflection figures, gave the firing order while keeping his eyes on the inclinometers indicating the rolling and pitching angles of the ship, received the fall of shot observation report from the spotter on the mast, calculated the new elevation and deflection to 'walk' the shots in on the target for the next round, without much means to discern or measure the movements of his own ship and the target. He typically had a view on the horizon, but with the new 12-inch gun's range extended to over 13 km (8 mi), his vantage point was lower than desired. (Note: Approximate distance to horizon is calculated by sqrt(2 x h x R) where R is the Earth radius and h is the observation height above the sealevel. (see horizon for details.) Using battleship Mikasa as the example, the height of gunsight on top of 12" main gun turret (technically they are barbettes with armoured covers that make them look like turrets) is about 10 to 11m from the waterline and the bridge height is about 16 to 18m from the waterline by estimating from the sideview plan. Using the globally-averaged earth radius of 6,371,000m for the R, the distance observable from the turret is sqrt(2 x 11 x 6371000m) = 11.8km. The distance observable from the bridge is sqrt(2 x 16 x 6371000m) = 14.3km. Mikasa's main guns had a range of 14km. (This explanatory note is provided for the benefit of the readers in accordance with WP:CALC.))

In the months before the battle, the Chief Gunnery Officer of Asahi, Lieutenant Commander Katō Hiroharu, aided by a Royal Navy advisor who introduced him to the use of the early mechanical computer Dumaresq in fire control, introduced a system for centrally issuing the gun-laying (Note: What ship to target, and the distance to the target were specified on the bridge. Each gun/turret aimed the target to determine the deflection, and used a distance-to-elevation conversion table for the gun to set the elevation.) and salvo-firing orders by voice. (Note: All the gunnery personnel on Mikasa was given a lecture on telephone systems at 17:20 on 18 April 1905 in Chinhae Bay.) Using a central system allowed the spotter to identify a salvo of distant shell splashes much more effectively than trying to identify a single splash among the many in the confusion of fleet-to-fleet combat. Further, the spotter needed to keep track of only one firing at a time, rather than multiple shots on multiple stopwatches, and report to only one officer on the bridge. The 'director' officer on the bridge had the advantage of a higher vantage point than in the gun turrets, and was steps away from the ship commander, giving orders to change course and speed in response to incoming reports on target movements.

This fire control director system was introduced to other ships in the fleet. The training and practice on this system were carried out in the months waiting for the arrival of the Baltic Fleet while its progress was reported by the British intelligence from their naval stations at Gibraltar, Malta, Aden (Yemen), Cape of Good Hope, Trincomalee (Ceylon), Singapore and Hong Kong, among other locations.

As a result, Japanese fire was more accurate in the far range (5–13 km or 3–8 mi), (Note: On 6-7 April 1905, Mikasa conducted the second sub-calibre gunnery training competition against Shikishima. Mikasa scored 285 hits / 927 shots (30.7%), Shikishima scored 258/974 (26.5% hitrate) on opposite course; Mikasa scored 894/1703 (52.5%), Shikishima scored 1085/1672 (64.9%) on the same course with the target at the distance of 280–720m at 6 knots, with towed target by torpedo-boat at 6 knots.) on top of the advantage they held in the shorter distances using the latest 1903 issue Barr and Stroud FA3 coincidence rangefinders of baselength 1.5 m (5 ft), (Note: Baselength is the distance between the left and the right lens or mirror facing the target, which largely determines the effective range of a rangefinder.) which had a range of 5.5 km (6,000 yd), while the Russian battleships were equipped with Lugeol stadiametric rangefinders from the 1880s (except battleships Oslyabya and Navarin, which had the Barr and Stroud 1895 issue FA2 of baselength 1.4 m (4.5 ft) retrofitted), which only had a range of about 4 km (4,400 yd).

=== Wireless telegraphy ===
The wireless telegraph (radio) had been invented during the last half of the 1890s, and by the turn of the century, nearly all major navies were adopting this improved communications technology. Tsushima was "the first major sea battle in which wireless played any role whatsoever".

Lieutenant Akiyama Saneyuki (who was the key staff to Admiral Tōgō in formulating plans and directives before and during the battle as a Commander, who also went aboard Nikolai I to accompany Admiral Nebogatov to Mikasa for a formal meeting with Tōgō) had been sent to the United States as a naval attaché in 1897. He witnessed the capabilities of wireless telegraphy firsthand during the Spanish–American War. He sent several memos to the Navy General Staff, urging them to push ahead as rapidly as possible to acquire the new technology. The IJN command became heavily interested in the technology; however, it found the Marconi wireless system, which was then operating with the Royal Navy, to be exceedingly expensive.

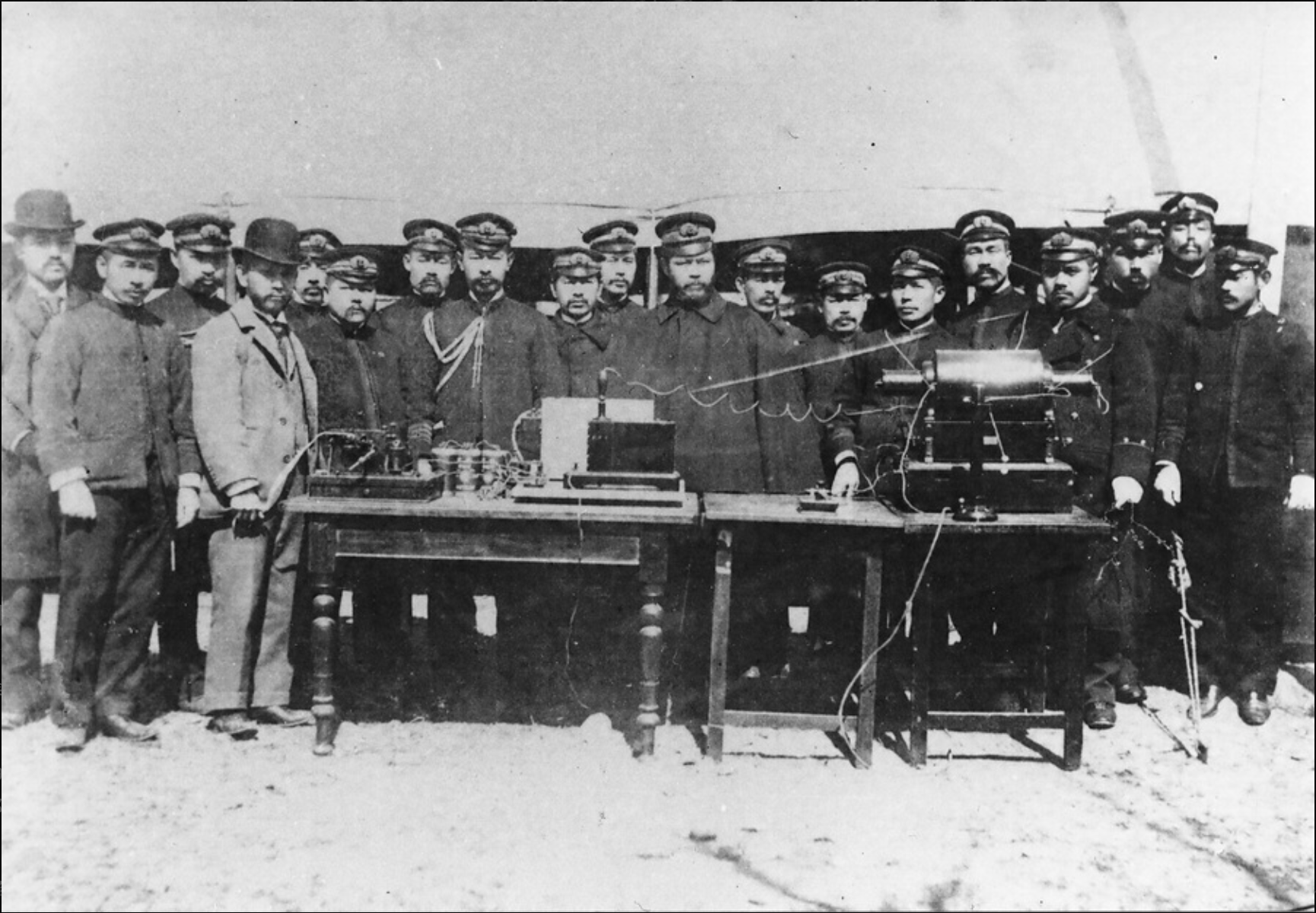
Kimura Shunkichi (in plain clothes on the front row) and the members of Imperial Japanese Navy Wireless Telegraph Research Committee in 1900. Front row, center in Navy uniform with a cape is Navy Minister (Admiral) Yamamoto Gonnohyōe

The Japanese therefore decided to create their own radio sets by setting up a wireless research committee under Professor Kimura Shunkichi, (Note: (1866–1938) Graduated from Tokyo University, Physics Dept.; studied at Lawrence Scientific School (Harvard) and Sheffield Scientific School (Yale) from 1893 to 1896. ja:木村駿吉) which eventually produced an acceptable system. In 1901, having attained radio transmissions of up to 95 km (60 mi) with the Type 34 (34th year of Meiji = 1901) set, the Navy formally adopted wireless telegraphy. Two years later, a laboratory, a factory, and the wireless telegraphy curriculum were set up at Imperial Japanese Navy Mines Training School in Yokosuka to produce the Type 36 (1903) wireless sets, (Note: See a picture of faithful replica set onboard battleship Mikasa in Yokosuka. Mikasa Preservation Committee. "Type 36 wireless set registered as Essential Historical Material for Science and Technology in 2008" (in Japanese). Archived from the original on 17 March 2024.) and these were quickly installed on every battleship and cruiser (including auxiliary cruisers) in the Combined Fleet by the time the war started. In January 1905, destroyers started receiving Type 36, but this program was not yet completed at this battle.

Alexander Stepanovich Popov, a professor at the Imperial Russian Navy Mines School in Kronstadt, had built and demonstrated a wireless telegraphy set in 1897. He collaborated with Frenchman Eugène Adrien Ducretet, who had succeeded in 4 km radio transmission demonstration between the Eiffel Tower and the Panthéon on 5 November 1898, to manufacture wireless telegraphy sets, called "Popov-Ducretet system" between 1899 and 1904, purchased by the Russian Navy to be installed to the ships in the (First) Pacific Fleet. This radiotelegraph set was further improved into "System Slaby-Arco" (Note: See Adolf Slaby and Georg von Arco, who were the engineers at Telefunken.) manufactured by the Russian factory of German Telefunken located at Kronstadt, and were installed to major ships in the Second Pacific Fleet.

Although both sides had early wireless telegraphy, the Russian sets were tuned and maintained by German technicians halfway into the voyage, (Note: Tanaka claims Telefunken engineers and radio operators disembarked and returned home after observing a withering level of sailor morale (drinking, gambling, etc.) during the two months of idle time at Île Sainte-Marie and Nosy Be, Madagascar.) while the Japanese had the advantage of using their own equipment maintained and operated by their own navy specialists trained at the Yokosuka school. (Note: For background information on the usage of wireless telegraphy at the time, and how tuning and maintenance were essential (just like drivers being required to be mechanics at the outset of automobiles), see: Packard, Winthrop (February 1904). "The Work of a Wireless Telegraph Man". The World's Work.)

=== British support ===
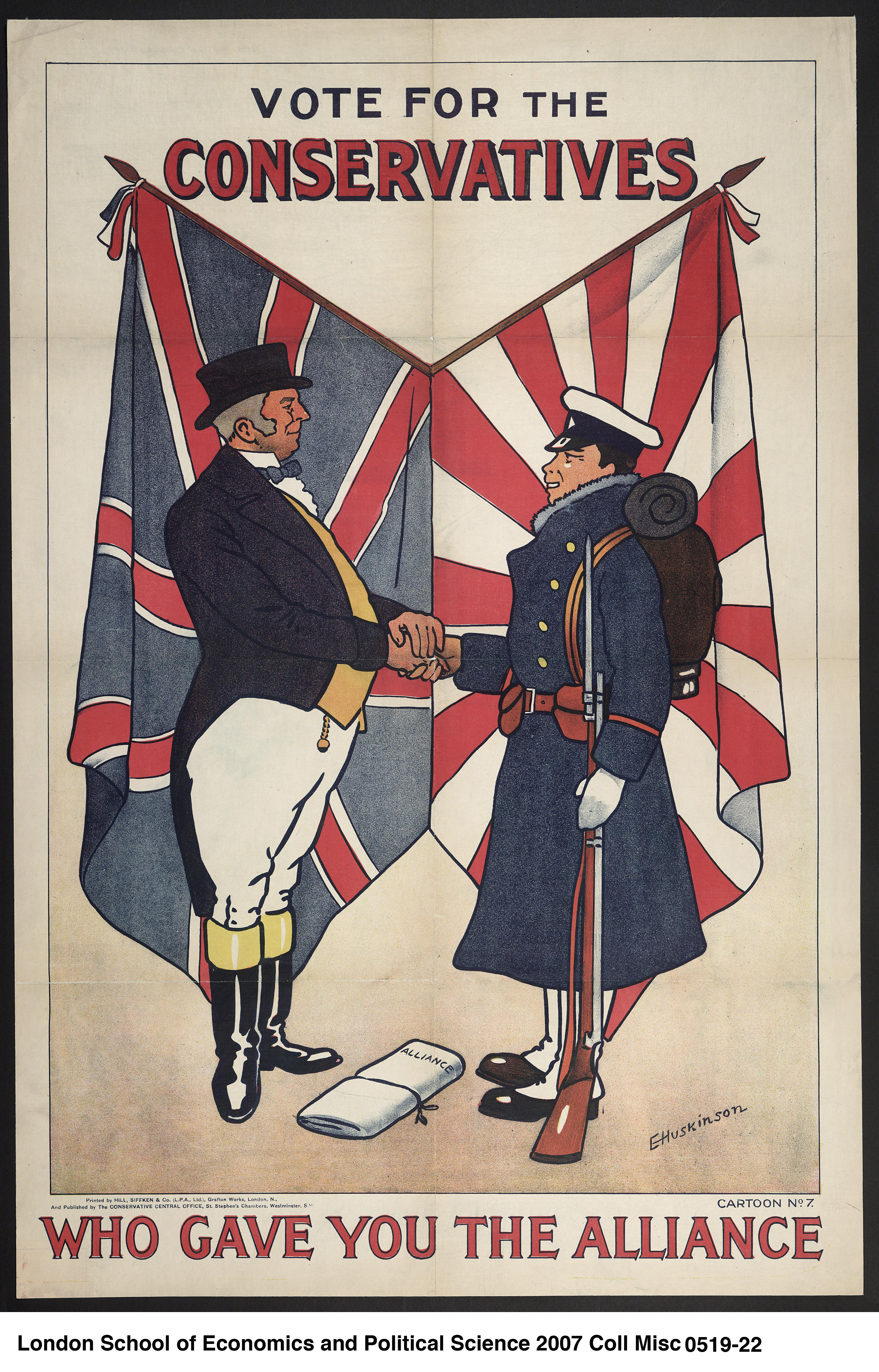
Illustration by E.Huskinson for the Conservative Party c. 1905–1910.

The United Kingdom assisted Japan by manufacturing guns (Note: IJN almost exclusively used Armstrong guns on its heavier ships of the time. Cruisers Chitose and Kasagi were built in the US, but their main guns were Armstrong. Cruisers Kasuga and Nisshin were built in Italy with Armstrong guns (Sir W.G. Armstrong & Company had a factory, Stabilimenti meccanici di Pozzuoli, in Italy). IJN licensed the design of Armstrong 8" guns and had started producing it in 1902.) and building battleships for the IJN. As an ally in the Anglo-Japanese Alliance, the UK also assisted Japan with intelligence, finance, technology, training, and other aspects of the war against Russia. At the time, Britain owned and controlled more harbour facilities around the world – specifically shipyards and coaling stations – than Russia and its allies (France, (Note: See Franco-Russian Alliance for details.) and to some extent Germany) combined. The UK also, where possible, obstructed Russian attempts to purchase ships and coal. France openly allowed the Baltic Fleet warships into Cherbourg and Tangier ports before and after the Dogger Bank Incident; and the UK formally protested in the post-Dogger Bank negotiations, pointing out that the neutral countries could not accept warships of the fighting countries into their ports without enforcing internment, (Note: The time was in between Hague Conventions of 1899 and 1907, and international agreements were not formalised on naval warfare yet (except on hospital ships). This argument made by Great Britain, based on Section IV "On the Internment of belligerents and the care of the wounded in neutral countries," (Article 57) of the 1899 agreement (which says "A neutral State which receives in its territory troops belonging to the belligerent armies shall intern them"), may have been acceptable to most governments in the world at the time. However, as it was incorporated into the 1907 Convention, it said "Belligerents are forbidden to use neutral ports and waters as a base of naval operations against their adversaries (Article 5)" with further articles permitting up to 24-hour stay (Article 12) for the maximum of three warships of a belligerent at war in any neutral port (Article 15) if the neutral power permitted.) and if France is no longer neutral in the war, the UK is obligated to commence military action in support of Japan as required in the Anglo-Japanese Alliance. (Note: The alliance required both countries to join the war if one of them faces "more than one" countries as the adversary. The Franco-Russian Alliance had a similar requirement, but only for wars against Germany. The French government had to accept the logic, as France did not wish to risk war against the UK, nor did it wish to give the Royal Navy any excuse to attack the Russian warships, with or without a declaration of war.) As a result, the rendezvous point for Rozestvensky and Fölkersahm squadrons was changed from the port of Diego Suarez to the waters around remote islands of Île Sainte-Marie and Nosy Be in Madagascar, and free access to the ports including Saigon and Ba Ngoi port in Cam Ranh Bay was denied for the fleet in French Indochina. (Note: When the Rozestvensky squadron reached Dakar after leaving Tangier, the ships were allowed into the port and carry out coaling, but upon exchanges of telegram messages with Paris by the local authorities, they were banned from the port. The German government, who had interned Russian battleship Tsesarevich at Qingdao on 11 August 1904, took a lenient stance towards the squadron as a neutral power in the war. After the Dakar stop, the Rozestvensky squadron reached Angra Pequena Bay in German South West Africa on 15 November 1904 (Gregorian), and the local Lüderitz authorities, busy in the Herero and Namaqua genocide, did not object to the mooring and coaling in the port until their departure on 21 November 1904.)

This support created a major logistical problem for the deployment of the Baltic Fleet from around the world to the Pacific in procuring coal and supplies along the way. At Nosy Be in Madagascar and at Camranh Bay, French Indochina, the fleet was forced to be anchored for about two months each, seriously degrading morale of the crew. By the time it reached the Sea of Japan, the hulls of all the ships in the fleet were heavily fouled in addition to carrying the extra coal otherwise not required on deck.

The Japanese ships, on the other hand, were well maintained in the ample time given by the intelligence. For example, battleship Asahi was under repair from November 1904 to April 1905 at Sasebo Naval Arsenal for two 12" guns lost and serious damage to the hull from striking a mine. They were divided into battle divisions of as much uniform speed and gun range so that a fleet would not suffer a bottleneck in speed, and the range of guns would not render some ships useless within a group in extended-range combat.

At the end of the Argentine–Chilean naval arms race in 1903, two Chilean-ordered and British-built battleships (then called Constitución and Libertad) and two Argentine-ordered, Italian-built cruisers (then called Bernardino Rivadavia and Mariano Moreno) were offered to Russia; the purchase was about to be finalised. Britain stepped in as the mediator of Pacts of May that ended the race, bought the Chilean battleships (which became HMS Swiftsure and HMS Triumph), and brokered the sale of Argentine cruisers to Japan. (Note: The Imperial Russia also tried to purchase Argentine cruisers General Belgrano and Pueyrredón, and Chilean cruisers Esmeralda and Chacabuco, all of which were also blocked by Great Britain.) This support not only limited the growth of the Imperial Russian Navy but also helped IJN in obtaining the Italian-built cruisers (IJN Kasuga and Nisshin) with a strong armour design (Note: Being in the Giuseppe Garibaldi class of armoured cruisers, and ordered by Argentina with the likelihood of facing the Chilean battleships in mind, they were the forerunners of the later battlecruisers. The design prioritised heavy armour at the expense of speed and cruise range, which were important for other designs for commerce raiding/protection. The Royal Italian Navy ranked this class of warships as 2nd-class battleships.) that enabled IJN to use them on the main line of battle along with the heavier-armoured battleships. (Note: Effectively replacing the two battleships previously lost in the war, the Hatsuse and Yashima.)

=== High explosive and cordite ===
The Japanese used mostly high-explosive shells filled with Shimose powder, which was a pure picric acid (as opposed to the French Melinite or the British Lyddite, which were picric acid mixed with collodion (French) or with dinitrobenzene and vaseline (British) for stability). Engineer Shimose Masachika (1860–1911) solved the instability problem of picric acid on contact with iron and other heavy metals by coating the inside of a shell with unpigmented Japanese lacquer and further sealing with wax. Because it was undiluted, Shimose powder had a stronger power in terms of detonation velocity and temperature than other high explosives at the time. These shells had a sensitive Ijuin fuse (named after Vice Admiral Ijuin Gorō (Note: He was credited with this invention as he spearheaded its development program as one of the leaders of IJN (as a senior member of Navy General Staff), with support and approval from Navy Minister (Admiral) Yamamoto Gonnohyōe who appointed Tōgō Heihachirō to the Commander in Chief of the Combined Fleet disregarding seniority ranking within IJN. Ijuin was a major proponent of Anglo-Japanese Alliance after having attended the Greenwich Naval Academy for a period, and was the key figure in IJN's tight relationship with Armstrong Mitchell & Company.)) at the base as opposed to the tip of a shell that armed itself when the rifling spun the shell. These fuses were designed to explode on contact and wreck the upper structure of ships. (Note: After hitting Russian battleship Peresvet 13 times with 12" and 15 more times with 6" or 8" shells; hitting Retvizan 18 times, Tsesarevich 15 times, Poltava 12–14 times, and Pobeda 11 times with 8" and larger armour-piercing shells with delayed detonation fuze without being able to sink any of them (likewise none of the Japanese battleships was sunk despite receiving many hits) in the Battle of the Yellow Sea, the Japanese tactical priority shifted from sinking to the destruction of superstructure. This concept of high-explosive incendiary shells (the first example of what is now called the HEI-BF "High Explosive Incendiary – Base Fuze" shells) was not used by any navy worldwide at the time. The Russian Navy used what is known as Makarov tip on its shells to improve penetrating performance upon hitting the target at an angle, without the experience of high explosive armour-piercing shells not being effective enough against the Harvey / Krupp armour and compartmented hull used on the battleships.) The Japanese Navy imported cordite from Great Britain as the smokeless propellant for these Shimose shells, so that the smoke off the muzzle would not impede the visibility for the spotters.

In the early 1890s, Vice Admiral Stepan Makarov, then the Chief Inspector of Russian naval artillery, proposed a new 12" gun design, and assigned a junior officer, Semyon V. Panpushko, to research the use of picric acid as the explosive in the shell. However, Panpushko died in an accidental explosion in an experiment due to the instability. (Note: Shimose Masachika also experienced an accidental explosion in 1887 and had lost dexterity in the left fingers. ja:下瀬雅允) Consequently, high explosive shells remained unreachable for the Russian Navy at the time of the Russo-Japanese War, and the navy continued to use the older armour-piercing rounds with guncotton (Nitrocellulose, Pyroxylin) bursting charges and the insensitive delayed-detonation fuses. They mostly used brown powder or black powder as the propellant, except Sissoi Veliky and the four Borodino-class ships that used smokeless gunpowder for the main 12" guns.

As a result, Japanese hits caused more damage to Russian ships than Russian hits on Japanese ships. Shimose blasts often set the superstructure, the paintwork, and the large quantities of coal stored on the decks on fire, and the sight of the spotters on Russian ships was hindered by the large amount of smoke generated by the propellant on each uncoordinated firing. (Note: On Christmas day on Julian Calendar in 1904 off Madagascar, Alexey Novikov-Priboy onboard battleship Oryol wrote: "At noon, the ocean expanse was filled with the thunder of guns. Each ship fired a salute of thirty-one shots. The squadron was enveloped in black powder smoke.") Moreover, the sensitivity difference of the fuse caused the Japanese off-the-target shells to explode upon falling on the water creating a much larger splash that sent destabilizing waves to Russian inclinometers, (Note: 12" shells creating an "incomparably larger splash than the enemy's on the water") (Note: "Japanese shells exploded even when they hit the water.") as opposed to the Russian shells not detonating upon falling on the water. (Note: 12" shells creating a "tall splash of 10–20 m") This made an additional difference in the aforementioned shot accuracy by aiding the Japanese spotters to make an easier identification in fall of shot observation.

=== Gun range and rate of fire ===
The Makarov proposal resulted in Model 1895 12-inch gun that extended the range of the previous Model 1886 12" Krupp guns (installed on Imperator Nikolai I and Navarin) from 5–6 km to 11 km (at 15-degree elevation) at the expense of significantly limited amount of explosives that can be contained in the 332 kg (732 lb) shell. (Note: These shells held 5.3 kg of guncotton, compared to 19.3 kg of Shimose powder for the Armstrong 12".) Reload time was also improved from 2–4 minutes previously to a rated 90 seconds, but in reality, it was 2.5–3 minutes. These guns were installed to Sissoi Veliky and the four Borodino-class ships.

The four modern Japanese battleships, Mikasa, Shikishima, Fuji, and Asahi, had the latest Armstrong 12" 40-calibre naval gun designed and manufactured by Sir W.G. Armstrong & Company ahead of its acceptance by the Royal Navy in the UK. These British-built 12" guns had a range of 14 km (15,000 yd) at 15-degree elevation and a rate of fire of 60 seconds with a heavier 390 kg (850 lb) shell. (Note: See Armstrong Whitworth 12-inch 40-calibre naval gun for details.) One of the reasons for the Royal Navy's late adoption of this type of gun was the accidental shell explosions in the barrel Japanese battleships experienced up to the Battle of the Yellow Sea in August 1904, which were diagnosed and almost rectified (Note: Battleship Shikishima still experienced this problem and lost a gun in the battle.) by the Japanese Navy with the use of aforementioned Ijuin Fuse by the time of this battle.

The Russian fleet had 20 of the 1895-issue longer-range 12" guns on five battleships, compared to 16 of the Armstrong 12" guns on four Japanese battleships. Statistically, this 20% advantage in the number of guns was much more than offset by the 60% disadvantage in the rate of fire difference of one shot in 2.5 minutes versus one minute. The range difference of 11 km versus 14 km translated into a flatter trajectory (smaller elevation and fall angle) for the Japanese shells, which resulted in a better hit rate for the Japanese shots (Note: When the trajectory is nearly flat, the shot hits the target even with a large range dispersion (+-100 m or more at 10 km range) because the height of the target ship effectively enlarges the target size. There is no such effect for the fall angles closer to 90 degrees, no matter how tall the target is.) when both sides had an equal distance facing each other in 11 km and shorter range. (Note: After the Nebogatov surrender, the Second in Command of battleship Oryol, Captain 2nd Rank K.L. Schwede, who was in charge of the ship at the surrender (the ship commander Captain 1st Rank N. Yung was seriously wounded and unconscious) was interviewed by Captain T. Nomoto (Note: Nomoto Tsunaakira (1858–1922) Commander of Asahi. Later Admiral. He had 3 tours of duty in Russia before the battle; once on an Imperial Russian Navy cruiser Admiral Nakhimov, twice as a military attaché to Japanese consulate in Russia."Naval Academy class of 7th" (in Japanese). Archived from the original on 11 August 2023.) on battleship Asahi. It turned out they knew each other from Nomoto's previous assignments in Russia. Schwede desperately wanted to know why the Japanese shots had such a much higher hit rate in the battle. Nomoto did not (or could not) explain and just boasted, "Our guns are meant and made to hit the target.")

== Aftermath ==
=== Battle damage and casualties ===
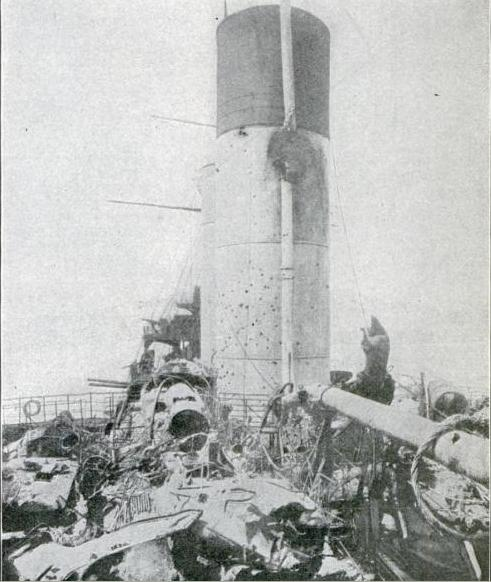
Heavy damage to Oryol

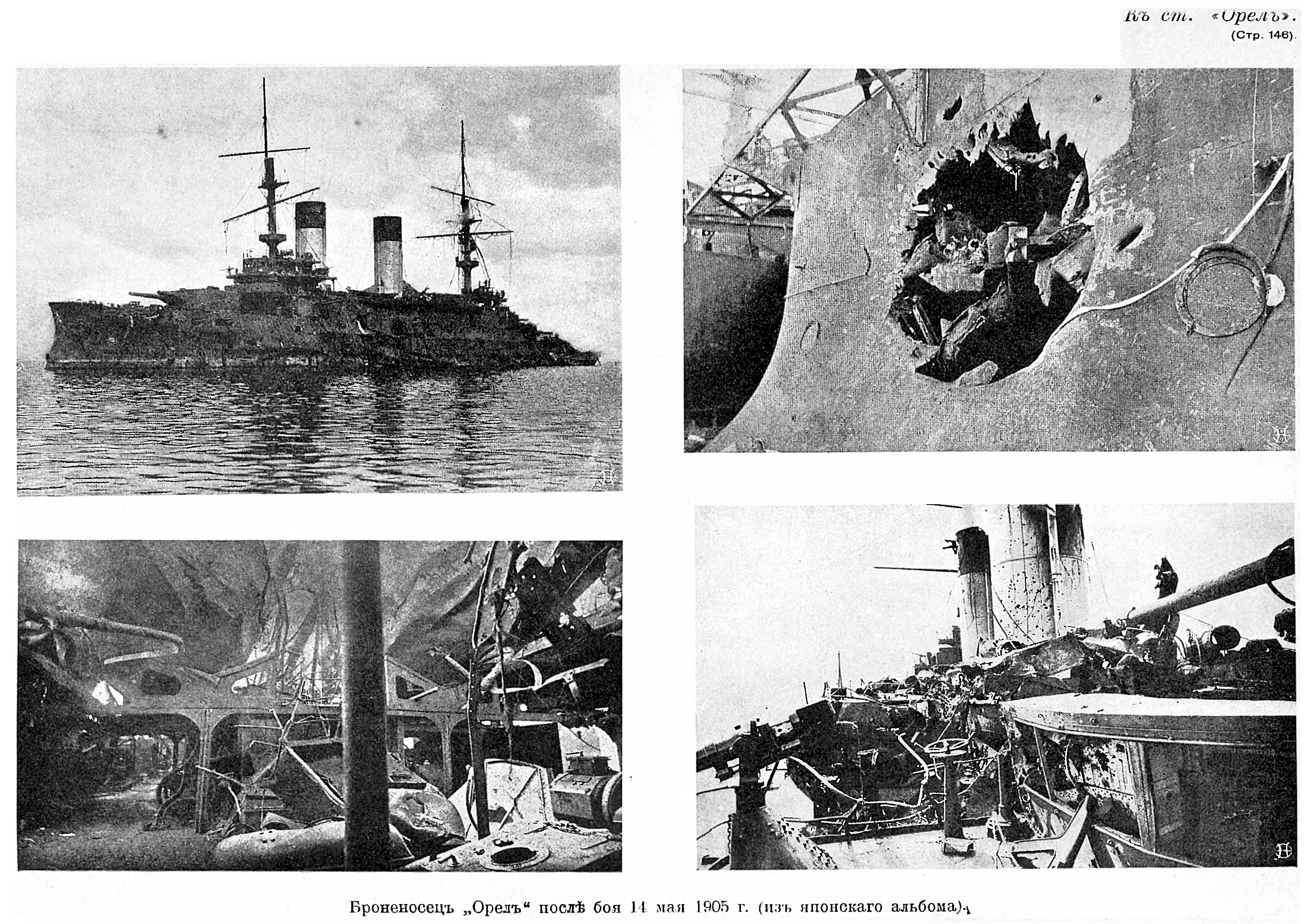
Oryol damages

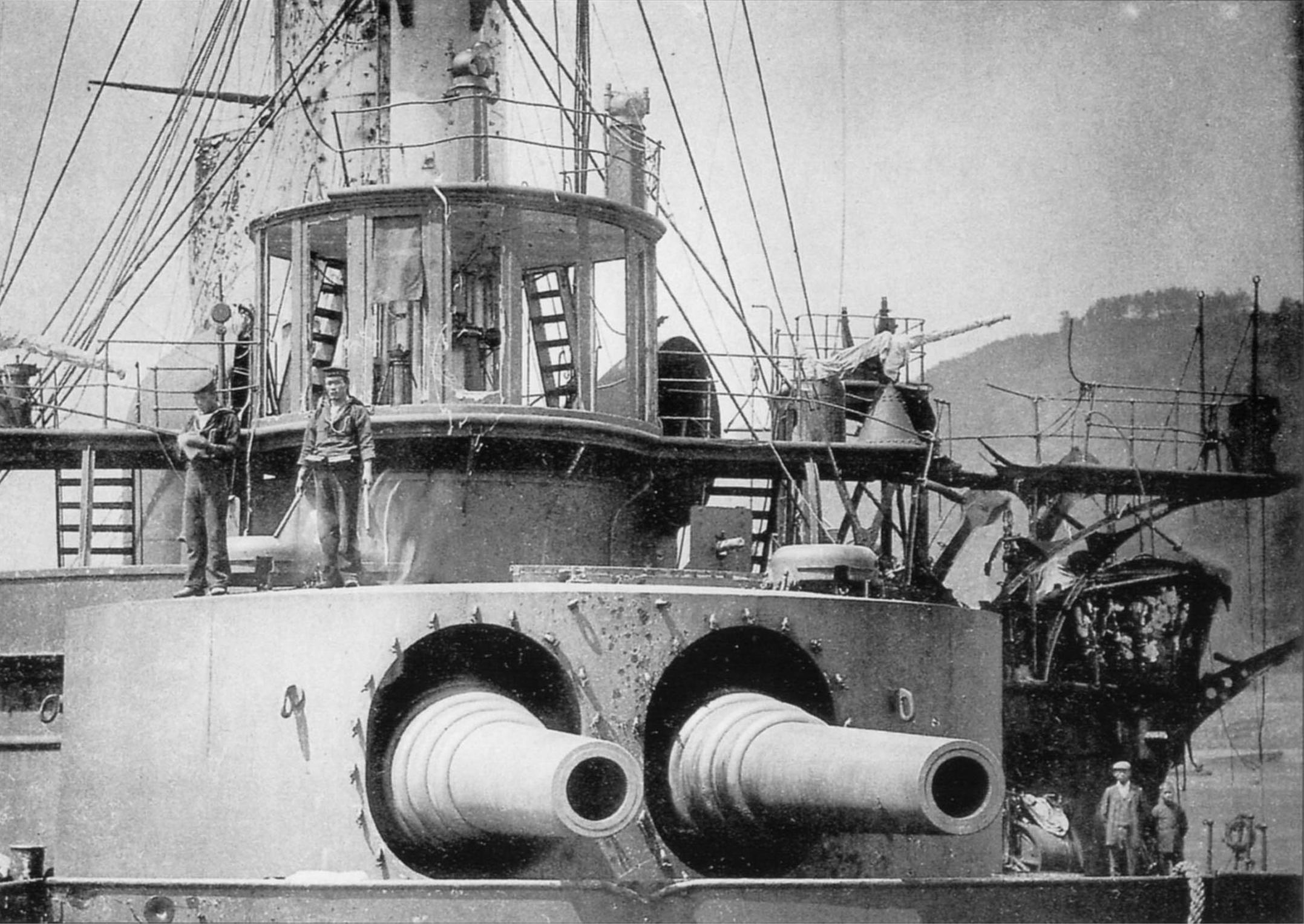
Light damage to Imperator Nikolai I

The wreck of the cruiser Izumrud off St. Vladimir Bay

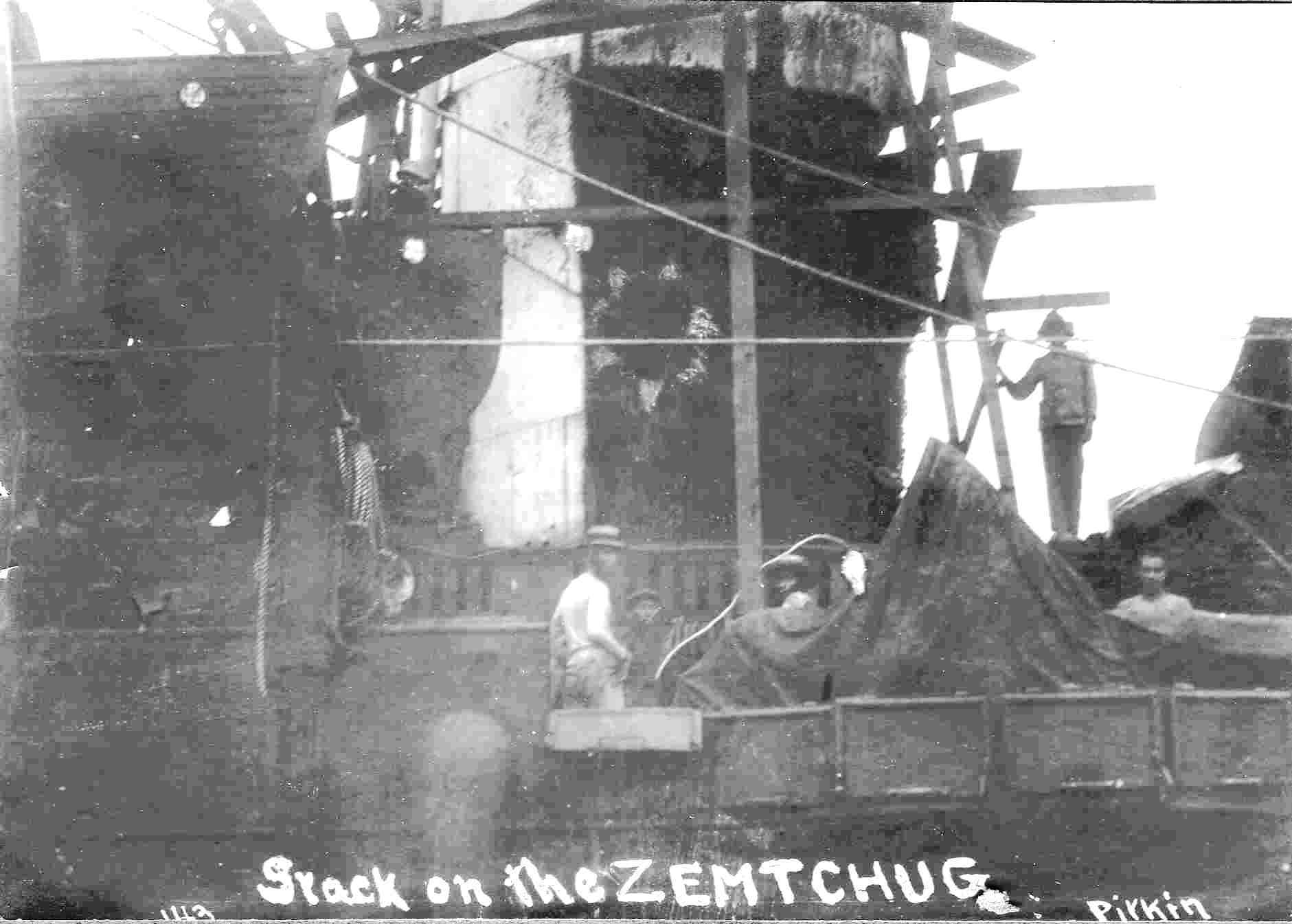
Battle damage to the cruiser Zhemchug, with shell hole in the stack

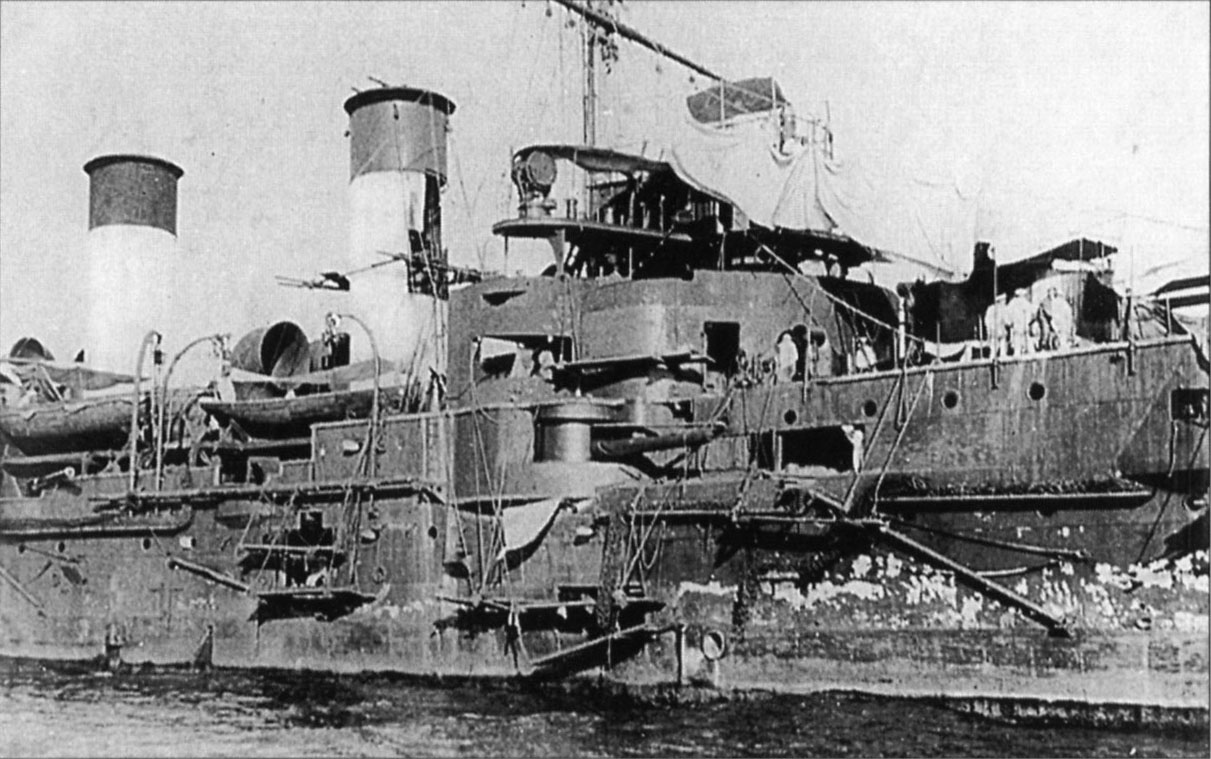
Battle damage to the cruiser Oleg

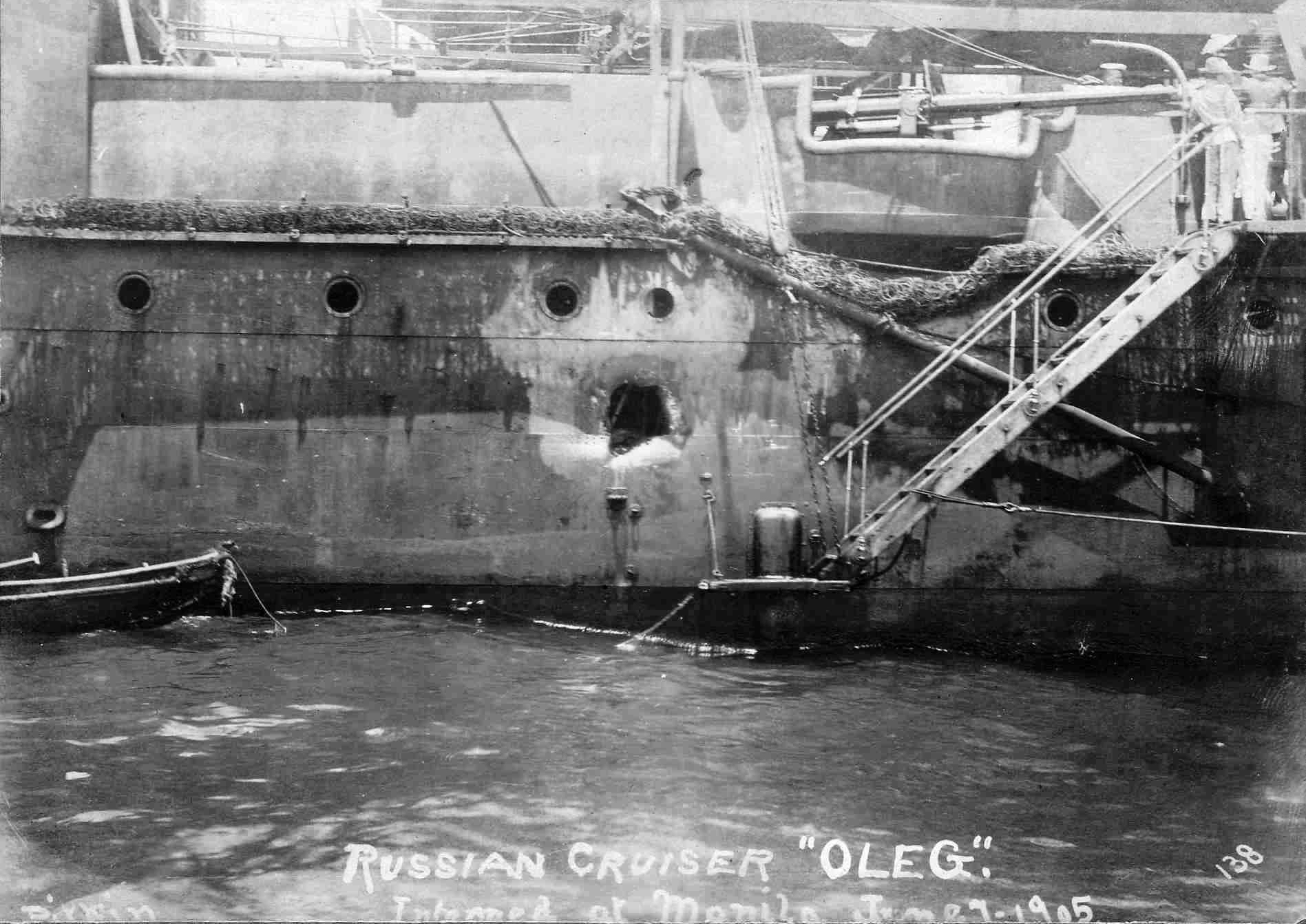
Damage to the cruiser Oleg, in Manila Bay

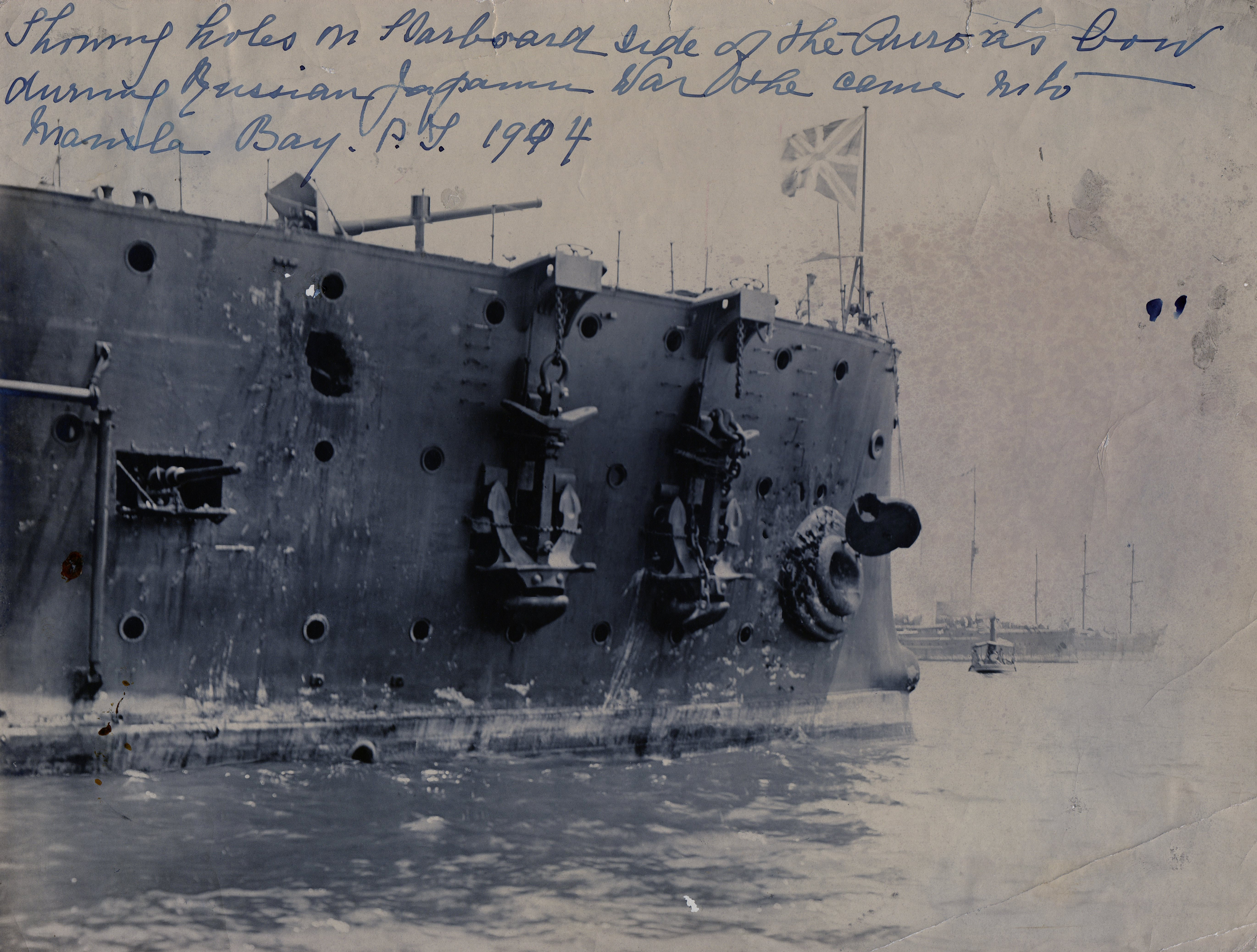
Battle damage to the cruiser Aurora

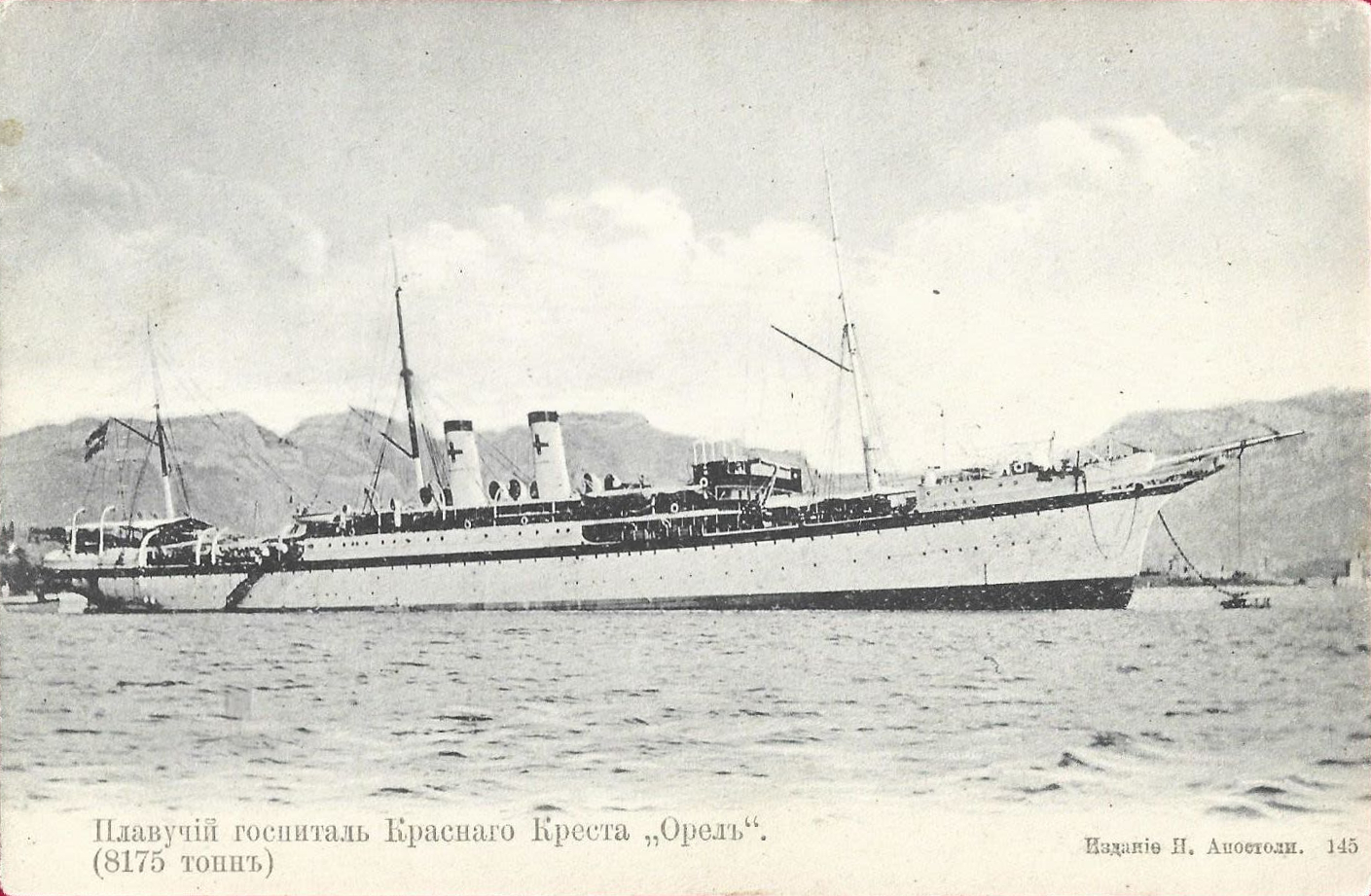
Hospital ship Orel

Russian 2nd. & 3rd. Pacific Fleet	Primary Armament	Water Line/Turret Armour	Disp./Length	Speed in Knots	Damage/Casualties/Remarks
Russian 2nd. & 3rd. Pacific Fleet	Primary Armament	Water Line/Turret Armour	Launched/Builder	Speed in Knots	Damage/Casualties/Remarks
Oslyabya, battleship	4 10-inch guns 11 6-inch guns	9 inches 9 inches	14,639tons/132.4m 1898/Russia	18.3	First modern battleship sunk by gunfire alone, sunk at 15:10, 27 May. She was the flagship for the fleet's second in command, Rear Admiral von Fölkersahm, who had died 3 days earlier. (Note: See #Russian losses) The Japanese and most of the Russian fleet were unaware of his death. Complement 771 officers and men.
Imperator Aleksandr III, battleship (Borodino class)	4 12-inch guns 12 6-inch guns	7 5/8 inches 10 inches	14,409tons/121m 1901/Russia	17.7	Sunk by gunfire from Japanese 1st Battle Div. at 18:50 27 May, complement 830 officers and men. 30 officers and 806 men lost, 4 survivors. (Note: There are sources that claim there were no survivors. However, Corbett (2015b) states, "About 6.50 the Alexandr, which had been struggling on astern of the Senyavin, listed heavily to port, and with a signal of distress flying sheered out of the line to port. Then, before anything could be done to assist her, she suddenly turned turtle and sank, carrying with her every man of her company except four", with a specific note: "The loss with her was 30 officers and 806 men." on p. 291. As Novikov-Priboy (1937) mentions, "There were several of us on the battleship Alexander III in excess of the complement", in Part Four. Squadron Fragments 1. What Mistakes Lead, this Corbett claim seems plausible.)
Knyaz Suvorov, battleship (Borodino class), fleet flagship	4 12-inch guns 12 6-inch guns	7 5/8 inches 10 inches	14,646tons/121m 1902/Russia	17.5	Shot into a wreck. Sunk at 19:20 27 May. Destroyers were ordered to administer the coup de grace, "while she had a gun above water she fired...[Suvorov's] stubborn gallantry, no words can do justice. If there is immortality in naval memory it is hers and theirs." Of her 40 officers and 888 men there were no survivors. (except the injured Admiral Rozhestvensky and his staff, who were rescued from the burning ship at 17:30 by destroyer Buyniy).
Borodino, battleship (Borodino class)	4 12-inch guns 12 6-inch guns	7 5/8 inches 10 inches	14,317tons/121m 1901/Russia	16.2	Sunk at 19:30 27 May by a 12-inch Parthian shot from the battleship Fuji which detonated the ammunition magazines, 1 survivor from a complement of 32 officers and 822 men.
Oryol, battleship (Borodino class)	4 12-inch guns 12 6-inch guns	1-10 inches 5.7–7.64 inches	14,378tons/121m 1902/Russia	18	Damaged seriously. Captured at 10:30 on 28 May under the command of Rear Admiral Nebogatov. The ship commander, Captain Nikolay Yung was seriously injured during the battle on 27 May and died in the night of 29 May on battleship Asahi. Recommissioned as IJN Iwami after an extensive repair on 2 November 1907. Stricken 1 September 1922. Sunk as an air-raid target on 10 July 1924.
Navarin, battleship	4 12-inch guns 8 6-inch guns	16 inches 12 inches	10,370tons/107m 1891/Russia	15.9	Sunk in the night of 27 May by destroyer torpedoes, 3 survivors from a complement of 674 officers and men. 1 man picked up by a local fishing boat, 2 picked up by a British merchantman.
Sissoi Veliky, battleship	4 12-inch guns 6 6-inch guns	16 inches 12 inches	10,567tons/107.23m 1894/Russia	15.7	Damaged heavily on the night of 27 May by destroyer torpedoes and could not keep up with the Nebogatov group. Disabled by 06:00 on 28 May, Surrendered to armed merchant cruisers Shinano Maru and Tainan Maru at 08:15, capsized and Sank at 10:05. 47 men lost, 42 officers, and 571 men saved.
Imperator Nikolai I, battleship flagship for 3rd Pacific Fleet	2 12-inch guns 4 9-inch guns	2.5–10 inches 6–14 inches	9,748tons/105.61m 1889/Russia	14	Captured at 10:30 28 May as the flagship for the commander of the 3rd Pacific Fleet, Rear Admiral Nikolai Nebogatov, when he hoisted the flag signal "XGE P" meaning "Surrendered. Go still (proceeding slow)." Received one 12-inch, two 8-inch, and two 6-inch hits. 5 officers/men killed, 35 wounded. Recommissioned as IJN Iki. Stricken 1 May 1915. Sunk as a gunnery target for IJN battleships Kongō and Hiei on 3 October 1915.
Admiral Ushakov, battleship (coastal battleship, or armoured coast defense vessel.)	4 10-inch guns 4 4.7-inch guns	10 inches 8 inches	5,081tons/87.3m 1893/Russia	16.1	Arrived late at 15:00, 28 May, at the Nebogatov surrender site. She did not accept the signaled news of surrender and started firing while fleeing from the site. Shot into a wreck by Iwate and Yakumo, scuttled at 19:00 as she was already sinking. 12 officers and 339 men were saved from her complement of 422 officers and men. Her commander, Captain Vladimir Nikolaevich Miklukha, refused help from the Japanese and went down with his ship. (Note: See ru:Адмирал Ушаков (броненосец).)
Admiral Seniavin, battleship (Coastal battleship, or armoured coast defense vessel.)	4 10-inch guns 4 4.7-inch guns	9.8 inches 3–7.9 inches	4,232tons/84.6m 1894/Russia	16	Captured at 10:30 28 May following the surrender together with her sister-ship General-Admiral Apraksin, flagship Imperator Nikolai I, and the battleship Oryol. Admiral Seniavin became IJN Mishima, stricken 10 October 1935. Sunk as an air-raid target for IJN Hōshō on 5 May 1936.
General-Admiral Apraksin, battleship (Coastal battleship, or armoured coast defense vessel.)	3 10-inch guns 4 4.7-inch guns	9.8 inches 3–7.9 inches	4,165tons/80.62m 1896/Russia	15	Captured at 10:30 28 May following the surrender together with her sister-ship Admiral Seniavin, flagship Imperator Nikolai I, and the battleship Oryol. General-Admiral Apraksin became IJN Okinoshima, decommissioned 1 April 1922, used as a training ship for Sasebo Marine Corps (Note: In IJN, the training facilities for recruits were called 海兵団 (かいへいだん, kaiheidan) "Sea Soldier Corps" which is translated as marine corps today.) until stricken in 1924. Sold in 1925, scrapped in 1939.
Admiral Nakhimov, armoured cruiser	8 8-inch guns 10 6-inch guns	10 inches 8 inches	7,906tons/103.3m 1885/Russia	16.6	Sunk in the night of 27 May by destroyer torpedoes. Over 600 men saved by lifeboats, local fishing boats, and armed merchant cruiser Sado Maru.
Vladimir Monomakh, armoured cruiser	5 6-inch guns 6 4.7-inch guns	6 inches –	5,683tons/90.3m 1882/Russia	15.8	Sunk in the night of 27 May by destroyer torpedoes. 32 officers and 374 men rescued by armed merchant cruiser IJN Manshu (IJN Manshu was the Austrian-built cruise ship Manchuria (Note: Built by Stabilimento Tecnico Triestino in Trieste as Russian: Маньчжурия, romanized: Manijurya in 1901.) owned and operated by the Russian Chinese Eastern Railway before the war). Complement of 493 officers/men.
Dmitrii Donskoi, armoured cruiser	6 6-inch guns 10 4.7-inch guns	6 inches –	5,976tons/93.4m 1883/Russia	16.5	The Japanese 3rd and 4th battle divisions found and engaged Donskoi on 28 May. Shot into a wreck in the afternoon but survived through nightfall. Scuttled in the early morning 29 May by her crew who rowed to Matsushima Island. (Note: 37.4915°N 130.9198°E) The survivors, including the saved crew of Oslyabya and Buyniy, were taken prisoner that afternoon by landing parties from destroyer Fubuki and Kasuga Maru. Her commander, Captain 1st rank Ivan Lebedev, died in a hospital in Sasebo.
Svetlana, protected cruiser	6 6-inch guns 10 47mm Hotchkiss guns	2 inches –	3,924tons/101m 1896/France	21	Sunk at 10:50, 28 May by gunfire from IJN cruisers Niitaka, Otowa and destroyer Murakumo east of Jukbyeon Bay on the east coast of Korea. (Note: 37.6°N 129.8°E See Russian cruiser Svetlana (1896)#Russo-Japanese War.) Estimated 169 men lost. 290 men (23 wounded) rescued by IJN Amerika Maru.
Izumrud, protected cruiser	8 4.7-inch guns 4 47mm Hotchkiss guns	1.3–3.0 inches 1.3 inches	3,153tons/111m 1903/Russia	24	Ran aground outside of St. Vladimir Bay (300 km ENE of Vladivostok) (Note: 40.4639°N 133.0363°E) in the night of 29 May. Destroyed by her crew. Complement of 350 eventually reached Vladivostok by land.
Bezuprechni, torpedo boat destroyer	3 torpedo tubes (carried 6 torpedoes); 1 3-inch gun 5 3-pounder guns	N/A	350tons/64m 1902/Russia	26	Sunk by gunfire on 28 May from IJN protected cruiser Chitose which expended 68 120mm, and 39 3-inch shells; joined later by IJN torpedo boat destroyer Ariake, which expended 12 rounds of her 3-inch shells at Bezuprechni.
Buyniy, torpedo boat destroyer	3 torpedo tubes (carried 6 torpedoes); 1 3-inch gun 5 3-pounder guns	N/A	350tons/64m 1901/Russia	26	Shot into a wreck during the day on 27 May. Kingston valves opened, and then she was sunk by gunfire from the armoured cruiser Dmitrii Donskoi on 28 May. Survivors of Buyniy onboard Dmitrii Donskoi paddled ashore with the rest of the men to Matsushima Island when Donskoi was scuttled on 29 May.
Gromkiy, torpedo boat destroyer	3 torpedo tubes (carried 6 torpedoes); 1 3-inch gun 5 3-pounder guns	N/A	420tons/64m 1904/Russia	26	IJN torpedo boat destroyer Shiranui dueled with Gromkiy on 28 May for over an hour at ranges from 4,000 to 5,000 meters. Destroyer Shiranui was equipped with 2 3-inch guns and 4 6-pounder guns, 2 torpedo tubes and 4 torpedoes, with a complement of 52 men. IJN Torpedo Boat #63 arrived, and Gromkiy surrendered. Japanese prize crew boarded Gromkiy, but she was so heavily damaged that she began to sink, forcing the prize crew to abandon ship quickly. She rolled over and sank at 12:43.
Blestyashchiy, torpedo boat destroyer	3 torpedo tubes (carried 6 torpedoes); 1 3-inch gun 5 3-pounder guns	N/A	440tons/64m 1901/Russia	26	Took an active role in rescuing survivors of Oslyabya, and received an 8-inch hit while doing so during the day action on 27 May. This hit killed the commander, Alexander Sergeevich Shamov. Scuttled after the crew and eight Oslyabya survivors were transferred to destroyer Bodriy on 28 May. (Note: Destroyers Blestyashchiy and Bodriy accompanied cruisers Oleg, Zhemchug and Aurora. Bodriy was left behind when Blestyashchiy crew needed to be picked up when Blestyashchiy's damages made her no longer seaworthy in the escape. Bodriy ran out of coal and was later rescued by a British transport vessel, which towed her to Shanghai to be interned.) 3 men lost. (Note: See ru:Блестящий (миноносец))
Bistriy, torpedo boat destroyer	3 torpedo tubes (carried 6 torpedoes); 1 3-inch gun 5 3-pounder guns	N/A	350tons/64m 1901/Russia	26	Accompanied Svetlana to the end. Fired upon and chased by cruisers Niitaka and Otowa and destroyer Murakumo. Destroyed after running ashore north of Jukbyeon Bay (Note: 36.7519°N 129.4683°E) on 28 May by her crew, who surrendered to the Japanese Jukbyeon signal station guards.
Byedoviy, torpedo boat destroyer	3 torpedo tubes (carried 6 torpedoes); 1 3-inch gun 5 3-pounder guns	N/A	350tons/64m 1903/Russia	26	Surrendered and captured by IJN Destroyer Sazanami in the late afternoon on 28 May with Admiral Rozhestvensky and the members of the Russian Second Pacific Fleet command. (Note: Byedoviy had over 80 personnel onboard at the time of surrender, according to a Japanese Navy record.) Byedoviy became IJN Satsuki, stricken 1 April 1913, BU 1921. (Note: See ja:皐月 (戦利駆逐艦) for details.)
Ural, auxiliary cruiser	2 4.7-inch 4 76mm guns 8 57mm Hotch. Guns (Note: See ru:Урал (вспомогательный крейсер))	N/A	7,840tons/160m 1890/Germany	20	Sunk by the Japanese 1st Div. bombardment and a torpedo by battleship Shikishima at 17:51 on 27 May.
Irtysh, auxiliary cruiser	8 3-pounder guns	N/A	7,661tons/- 1899/Great Britain (Note: Purchased from HAPAG in 1904. ex-Belgia)	10.5	Disabled by battle damage and abandoned 4 km off the Japanese coast of Shimane on 28 May. Sank before dawn, 29 May. All 235 onboard, including Captain Egormyshev, were rescued by the residents of Waki town. (Note: 35.0025°N 132.1940°E)
Kamchatka, Repair ship	6 47mm Hotchkiss guns	N/A	7,200tons/76.25m 1902/Russia	12	Shot into a wreck by the Japanese 1st Div. at 17:36, sunk by Sixth Div. at 19:30 on 27 May.
Orel, Hospital ship	N/A	N/A	5,073tons/131.7m 1889/Great Britain (Note: Built for the Russian Volunteer Fleet Association, Odessa, as a passenger ship, and then converted to a hospital ship.)	19	Captured by IJN merchant cruiser Sado Maru at 15:30 on 27 May. (Note: At 22:45 on 18 May 1905, the Baltic Fleet spotted and conducted a boarding inspection on a British transport vessel, SS Oldhamire, that was sailing alongside the fleet. As Oldhamire was carrying 150,000 cans of oil destined for Japan, she became subject of a maritime capture, and was forced to join the fleet with Russian officers onboard. The removed captain, the chief engineer, and two more British personnel were kept in captivity onboard the hospital ship Orel. This imprisonment of 3rd-country nationals violated the international maritime agreements for hospital ships—specifically Convention (III) for the Adaptation to Maritime Warfare of the Principles of the Geneva Convention of 22 August 1864 (The Hague, 29 July 1899), which defines hospital ships as being "solely for the purpose of assisting the wounded, sick or shipwrecked" (Article 1; see Hague Convention on Hospital Ships for signatory countries, noting the absence of the UK). Consequently, Orel was kept as a prize of war by Japan.) Converted back to ocean liner, renamed Kusuho Maru and operated by Tōyō Kisen Kaisha on Tokyo-Honolulu route. Engines and other equipment gutted at Port of Osaka in 1910, and returned to Russia in 1916, scrapped shortly after.
Rus, Ocean tug	N/A	N/A	611tons/51.4m 1903/Germany	10	Sunk by Japanese cruisers after being rammed by auxiliary cruiser Anadyr (On her way to save the crew of the sinking Ural) on 27 May.

The Russian cruiser Almaz (imperial yacht) and two torpedo boat destroyers Grozniy and Braviy reached Vladivostok. Protected cruisers, Aurora, Zhemchug, and Oleg, escaped to the U.S. Naval Base Subic Bay in the Philippines, and were interned. Ammunition ship Koreya, transports Yaroslavl, Vladimir, Kuronia, Voronezh, Livonia and Meteor as well as ocean tug Svir went to Shanghai and eventually returned home. Destroyer Bodriy was interned in Shanghai. Transports Mercury, Tambov, Herman Lerke, Count Stroganov and repair ship Ksenia were sent home via Saigon. Auxiliary cruisers Rion and Dniepr eventually reached back home after some raiding activities in the Yellow Sea. Auxiliary cruisers Kuban and Terek were interned at Batavia in Dutch East Indies by the Netherlands. Auxiliary (merchant) cruiser Anadyr escaped to Madagascar. Hospital ships Orel and Kostroma were captured by the Japanese. Kostroma was released afterwards.

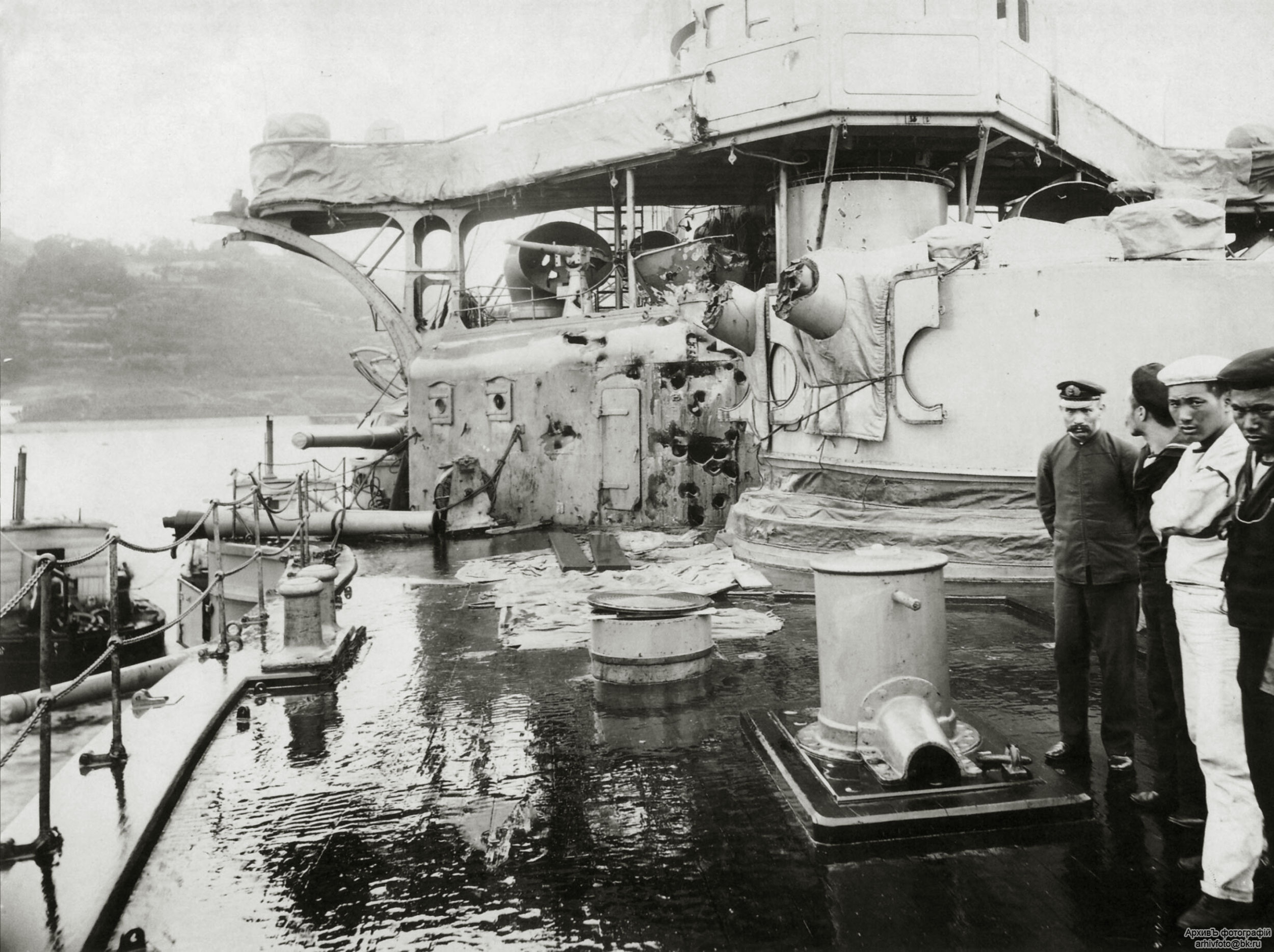
Battle damage to the cruiser Nisshin

Japanese Combined Fleet	Primary Armament	Water Line/Turret Armour	Disp./Length	Speed In Knots	Damage/Casualties/Remarks
Japanese Combined Fleet	Primary Armament	Water Line/Turret Armour	Launched/Builder	Speed In Knots	Damage/Casualties/Remarks
Mikasa, battleship fleet flagship	4 12-inch guns 14 6-inch guns	9 inches 14 inches	15,140tons/131.7m 1900/Great Britain	18.5	Took over 30 large-calibre hits; ventilators and funnels holed, armour penetrated in several places, top part of rear mast lost; over 100 casualties, complement of 875 officers/men.
Shikishima, battleship	4 12-inch guns 14 6-inch guns	9 inches 14 inches	14,850tons/133.5m 1898/Great Britain	19	Several large-calibre hits in a total of nine times. Lost one 12-inch gun barrel to a "burst" (barrel exploded).
Fuji, battleship	4 12-inch guns 10 6-inch guns	18 inches 14 inches	12,533tons/114m 1896/Great Britain	18.5	Several large-calibre hits in a total of 12 times. Lost eight men and nine wounded. One 12-inch gun barrel shot off by a 12-inch shell from Imperator Nikolai I.
Asahi, battleship	4 12-inch guns 14 6-inch guns	9 inches 14 inches	15,200tons/129.62m 1899/Great Britain	18.3	A few large-calibre hits in the total of 6 hits. Complement of 835 officers/men, lost 1 officer and 6 men, 5 men seriously wounded, 1 officer and 18 men lightly wounded.
Kasuga, armoured cruiser	1 10-inch gun 2 8-inch guns 14 6-inch guns	5 1/2 inches 5 1/2 inches	7,700tons/105m 1902/Italy	20.1	One 12-inch, one 6-inch, and one unidentified hits. Complement of 609 officers/men.
Nisshin, armoured cruiser flagship of 1st Div.	4 8-inch guns 14 6-inch guns	5.9 inches 5.9 inches	7,700tons/105m 1903/Italy	20.2	Hit by 6 twelve-inch, 1 nine-inch, 2 six-inch, and 4 unidentified shells. (Note: These were the most hits received after Mikasa. Imperator Nikolai I is the only Russian ship with nine-inch guns in this battle.) Two 8-inch gun barrels shot off, another 8-inch gun lost to a "burst". The 1st Div. command, Vice Admiral Misu Sōtarō, was seriously injured; his chief of staff, Commander Matsui Kenkichi, was killed. Complement 609 officers/men; 50 casualties.
Asama, armoured cruiser (2nd Div.)	4 8-inch guns 14 6-inch guns 5 torpedo tubes	3.5-7 inches 6.3 inches	9,710tons/134.7m 1898/Great Britain	22.1	Hit by a 12-inch shell at 14:27 on 27 May, which took her steering mechanism out of order, and she fell out of formation. Received three 12-inch, two 8-inch, and about seven smaller hits. Lost 11 men, injured 13 out of the complement of 676.
Iwate, armoured cruiser (2nd Div.)	4 8-inch guns 14 6-inch guns 4 torpedo tubes	3.5–7 inches 6.3 inches	9,423tons/132.3m 1900/Great Britain	20.75	2nd Div. initially fired on Oslyabya, then the Russian 3rd Pacific Squadron, and faced the damaged Knyaz Suvorov, which appeared out of a mist at about 2,000m range at 15:35 on 27 May. Hit by two 12-inch, three 8-inch, two 6-inch, and four smaller/unidentified shells. One of them hit the starboard forward upper 6" casemate, igniting the ready-use ammunition inside. 40 officers/men killed and 37 wounded out of the Complement of 672.
Kasagi, armoured cruiser 3rd Div. flagship	2 8-inch guns 10 12 cm guns 5 torpedo tubes	- 4.5 inches	4,862tons/114.1m 1898/U.S.A.	22.5	Japanese 3rd Div. engaged Oleg, Aurora and Zhemchug at about 14:30 27 May, and the flagship Kasagi received three 6" hits below waterline where she does not have armour plates. This hit flooded a boiler room and coal bunkers, killing one and injuring nine men, which necessitated a repair. Kasagi and her American-built sister Chitose withdrew from the battle and Vice Admiral Dewa Shigetō moved his flag to Chitose. Complement of 405.
Harusame, torpedo boat destroyer First Destroyer Div. lead ship	2 3-inch guns 4 57 mm guns 2 torpedo tubes	N/A	375tons/69.2m 1902/Japan	29	In the confusion of the night attack on 27 May, Harusame collided with Yūgiri and incurred serious flooding but avoided sinking. Complement 62.
Yūgiri, torpedo boat destroyer (Fifth Destroyer Div.)	1 8 cm gun 5 57 mm guns 2 torpedo tubes	N/A	322tons/63.6m 1899/Great Britain	30	During the night of 27 May, Yūgiri collided with the fellow destroyer Harusame, seriously damaging the bow. She avoided sinking and limped back to Sasebo on 28 May. Complement 58.
Torpedo Boat #34	1 3-pounder gun 3 torpedo tubes	N/A	83tons/39m 1899/Germany	24	Sunk by Russian gunfire, 27 May. This boat belonged to Takeshiki Guard District outside of the Combined Fleet.
Torpedo Boat #35	1 3-pounder gun 3 torpedo tubes	N/A	83tons/39m 1899/Germany	24	Sunk by Russian gunfire, 27 May. This boat belonged to Takeshiki Guard District outside of the Combined Fleet.
Torpedo Boat #69	2 3-pounder guns 3 torpedo tubes	N/A	89tons/40.1m 1902/Japan	24	Sank during a torpedo attack on the night of 27 May, after colliding with IJN torpedo boat destroyer Akatsuki. Akatsuki (later renamed Yamabiko) was a Russian prize from Battle of the Yellow Sea, captured on 12 August 1904, the ex-Reshitel‘nyi. (Note: The original Japanese destroyer Akatsuki sank after striking a mine in the siege of Port Arthur on 17 May 1904. IJN concealed the loss and gave the 'Akatsuki' name to the captured Reshitel‘nyi as if the original returned to service. At the beginning of this battle, there was a plan to dispatch Akatsuki, being indistinguishable from other Russian destroyers, in front of the Baltic Fleet to lay chained floating mines. Tōgō did not use this ploy, and the destroyer was added to the Navy list as Yamabiko (and Akatsuki struck) after the war.)

=== Russian losses ===
Russian personnel losses were 216 officers and 4,614 men killed; with 278 officers and 5,629 men taken as Prisoners Of War (POW). Interned in neutral ports were 79 officers and 1,783 men. Escaping to Vladivostok and Diego-Suarez were 62 officers and 1,165 men.

The battle was humiliating for Russia, which lost all its battleships and most of its cruisers and destroyers. The battle effectively ended the Russo-Japanese War in Japan's favour. The Russians lost 4,380 killed and 5,917 captured, with a further 1,862 interned. Two admirals, Rozhestvensky and Nebogatov, were captured by the Japanese Navy. The second in command of the fleet, Rear Admiral Dmitry Gustavovich von Fölkersahm, after suffering a cerebral hemorrhage on 16 April, died in the night of 24 May 1905 onboard battleship Oslyabya. Vice Admiral Oskar Enqvist fled to Manila onboard cruiser Oleg and was interned by the United States.

==== Battleships ====
The Russians lost eleven battleships, including three smaller coastal battleships, either sunk or captured by the Japanese, or scuttled by their crews to prevent capture. Four were lost to enemy action during the daylight battle on 27 May: Knyaz Suvorov, Imperator Aleksandr III, Borodino and Oslyabya. Navarin was lost during the night action on 27–28 May, while the Sissoi Veliky and Admiral Ushakov were either scuttled or sunk the next day. Four other battleships, under Rear Admiral Nebogatov, were forced to surrender and would end up as prizes of war. This group consisted of only one modern battleship, Oryol, along with the old battleship Imperator Nikolai I and two small coastal battleships General-Admiral Apraksin and Admiral Seniavin.

==== Cruisers ====
The Russian Navy lost five of its nine cruisers during the battle; three more were interned by the U.S., with just one reaching Vladivostok. Vladimir Monomakh and Svetlana were sunk the next day after the daylight battle. The cruiser Dmitrii Donskoi fought against six Japanese cruisers on the 28th and barely survived with many officers and crew killed onboard, and was scuttled on 29 May 1905 due to heavy damage. Izumrud ran aground on the Siberian coast. Three Russian protected cruisers, Aurora, Zhemchug, and Oleg, escaped to the U.S. naval base at Manila in the then-U.S.-controlled Philippines where they were interned by the U.S. The armed yacht (classified as a cruiser) Almaz, alone was able to reach Vladivostok.

==== Destroyers and auxiliaries ====
Imperial Russia also lost six of its nine destroyers in the battle, had one interned by the Chinese, and the other two reached Vladivostok. Buyniy ("Буйный"), Bezuprechniy ("Безупречный"), Gromkiy ("Громкий") and Blestyashchiy ("Блестящий") were sunk on 27 May. Bistriy ("Быстрый") was beached and destroyed by her crew the next day. Byedoviy ("Бедовый") surrendered also on 28 May. Destroyer Bodriy ("Бодрый") ran out of coal, and was interned in Shanghai. Grozniy ("Грозный") and Braviy ("Бравый") reached Vladivostok.

Of the auxiliaries, repair ship Kamchatka, auxiliary cruiser Ural, and ocean tug Rus were sunk on 27 May, auxiliary cruiser Irtysh was disabled, abandoned on 28 May, and then sank on 29 May. Ammunition ship Koreya and ocean tug Svir reached Shanghai and returned home. After being ordered to separate from the fleet on 22 May, auxiliary cruisers Kuban and Terek were interned at Batavia in Dutch East Indies by the Netherlands on 9 June 1905 after raiding a British and a Danish steamer destined for Japan. Transports Yaroslavl, Vladimir, Kuronia, Voronezh, Livonia, and Meteor were detached from the fleet on 25 May, reached Shanghai, and returned home. Auxiliary cruisers Rion and Dniepr escorted the transports to Shanghai, engaged in commerce raiding activities in the Yellow Sea, and returned to Kronstadt on 31 July 1905. Transports Mercury, Tambov, Herman Lerke, Count Stroganov and repair ship Ksenia, which accompanied the Third Pacific Fleet to Cam Ranh Bay, had been sent home via Saigon. Merchant cruiser Anadyr escaped to Madagascar and then returned home. The hospital ships Orel and Kostroma were captured during the battle; Kostroma was released afterwards.

=== Japanese losses ===
The Japanese lost three torpedo boats (Nos. 34, 35, and 69). Personnel losses were 117 officers and men killed, and 583 officers and men wounded.

=== Political consequences ===
Imperial Russia's prestige was badly damaged, and the defeat was a blow to the Romanov dynasty. Most of the Russian fleet was lost; the fast armed yacht Almaz (classified as a cruiser of the 2nd rank) and the destroyers Grozny and Bravy were the only Russian ships to reach Vladivostok. In The Guns of August, the American historical writer and journalist Barbara Tuchman argued that because Russia's loss destabilised the balance of power in Europe, it emboldened the Central Powers and contributed to their decision to go to war in 1914.

The battle had a profound cultural and political impact on the world. It was the first defeat of a European power by an Asian nation in the modern era. It also heightened the alarm of "The Yellow Peril" as well as weakening the notion of white superiority that was prevalent in some Western countries. Mahatma Gandhi (India), Mustafa Kemal Atatürk (Turkey), Sun Yat-sen (China) and Jawaharlal Nehru (India) were amongst the future national leaders to celebrate this defeat of a colonial power. The victory established Japan as the sixth greatest naval power while the Russian navy declined to one barely stronger than that of Austria-Hungary.

In The Guinness Book of Decisive Battles, the British historian Geoffrey Regan argues that the victory bolstered Japan's increasingly aggressive political and military establishment. According to Regan, the lopsided Japanese victory at Tsushima:

...created a legend that was to haunt Japan's leaders for forty years. A British admiral once said, 'It takes three years to build a ship, but 300 years to build a tradition.' Japan thought that the victory had completed this task in a matter of a few years ... It had all been too easy. Looking at Tōgō's victory over one of the world's great powers convinced some Japanese military men that with more ships, and bigger and better ones, similar victories could be won throughout the Pacific. Perhaps no power could resist the Japanese navy, not even Britain and the United States.

Regan also believes the victory contributed to the Japanese road to later disaster, "because the result was so misleading. Certainly the Japanese navy had performed well, but its opponents had been weak, and it was not invincible... Tōgō's victory [helped] set Japan on a path that would eventually lead her" to the Second World War.

Takano Isoroku, the future Japanese admiral Yamamoto Isoroku who would plan the attack on Pearl Harbor and command the Imperial Japanese Navy through much of the Second World War, served as a junior officer (aboard Nisshin) during the battle and was wounded and lost two fingers by an accidental explosion of an 8-inch shell in a forward gun. Had he lost a third, he would have been medically discharged from the IJN.

=== Dreadnought arms race ===
Before the Russo-Japanese War, countries constructed their battleships with mixed batteries of mainly 6-inch (152 mm), 8-inch (203 mm), 10-inch (254 mm), and 12-inch (305 mm) guns, with the intent that these battleships fight on the battle line in a close-quarter, decisive fleet action. The Battle of Tsushima conclusively demonstrated that faster battleships and big guns with longer ranges were superior to batteries of mixed-size guns.

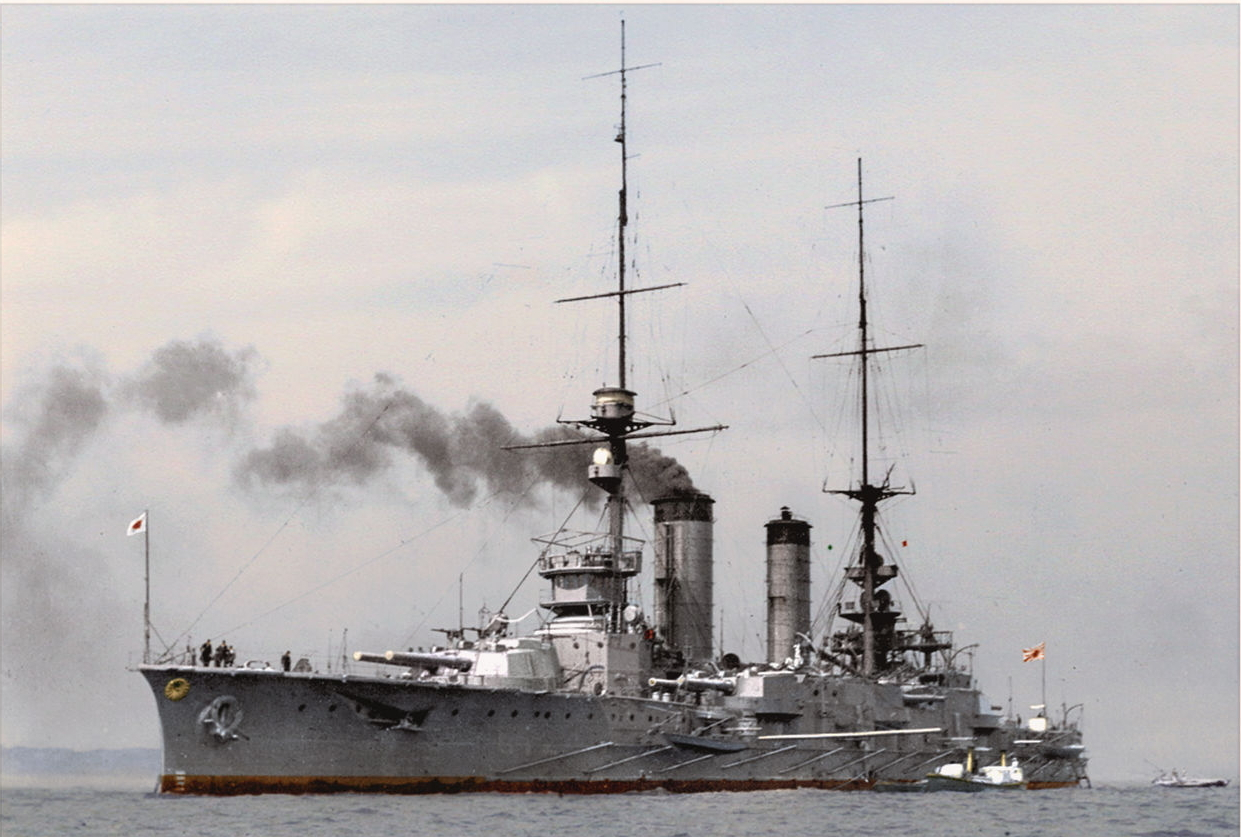
Japanese battleship Satsuma, laid down on 15 May 1905, earlier than HMS Dreadnought, was designed with 12 x 12" 40 Cal. guns. (She ended up with 4 x 12" 45 Cal. Armstrong plus 12 x 10" 45 Cal. Vickers guns and became the largest battleship in the world at launch in 1906.)

Britain's First Sea Lord, Admiral Jackie Fisher, reasoned that the Japanese victory at Tsushima confirmed the importance of large guns and speed for modern battleships. Captain William Pakenham of the British Royal Navy, who had been present aboard the Japanese battleship Asahi as an official observer during the Tsushima Battle, "famously remarked...the effect of the fire of every gun is so much less than that of the next larger size, that when 12in guns are firing, shots from 10in pass unnoticed...everything in this war has tended to emphasize the vast importance to a ship, at every stage of her career, of carrying some of the heaviest and furthest shooting guns that can be got into her." In October 1905, the British began construction of HMS Dreadnought, which marked the beginning of a naval arms race between Britain and Germany in the years before 1914.

The battle also accelerated the naval arms race geopolitically. However, the Anglo-German naval arms race had begun in 1897, and the collapse of Russian naval power in 1905 allowed Britain to send the bulk of its naval forces to other regions, reassured by its ally Japan's naval superiority in the Far East. In turn, the presence of a larger British fleet in Europe meant that the Germans felt forced to build a proportionally larger fleet to maintain the same relative power, in accordance with von Tirpitz's fleet in being principle. The Royal Navy, in turn, must increase its fleet size to maintain the relative power as set out by its two-power standard. This positive feedback meant that any external increase in the regional naval power of one side – in this case, the British – would precipitate not just a proportional increase in naval power from the opposing side, but rather a mutual multi-stage build-up in naval power on both sides, before settling to a higher equilibrium. Ultimately, the Germans passed three of their five Fleet Acts after Tsushima within a span of 6 years.

Upon the outbreak of World War I, the British and Germans were both aware of the potentially devastating consequences of a naval defeat on the scale of Tsushima. Britain needed its battle fleet to protect its empire and the trade routes vital to its war effort. Winston Churchill, then First Lord of the Admiralty, described British Admiral John Jellicoe as "the only man who on either side could lose the war in an afternoon." German naval commanders, for their part, understood the importance Kaiser Wilhelm II attached to his navy and the diplomatic prestige it carried. As a result of caution, the British and German fleets met in only one major action in World War I, the indecisive Battle of Jutland.

== Timeline ==
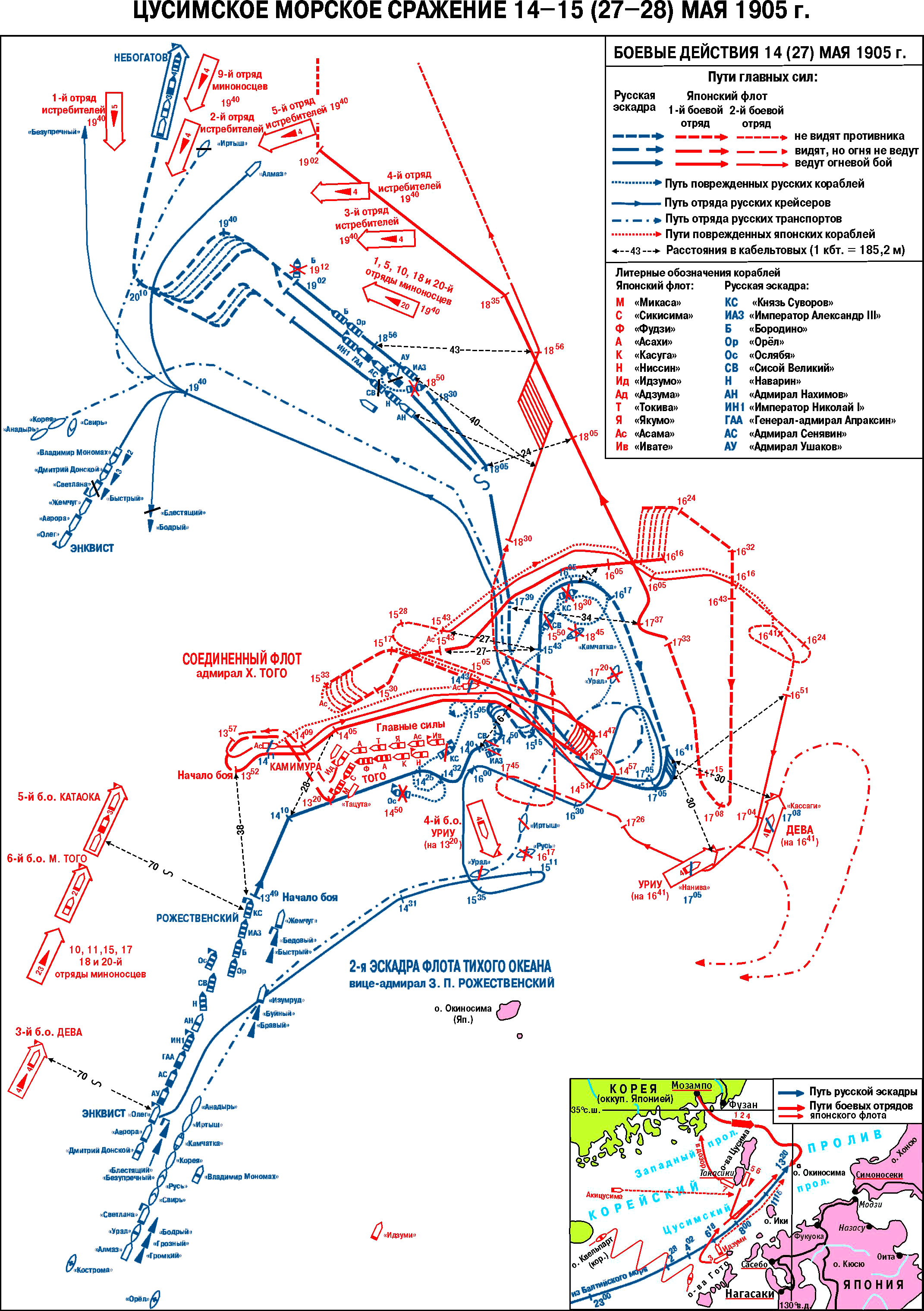
Day Action, Battle of Tsushima 27 May 1905 (click to enlarge)

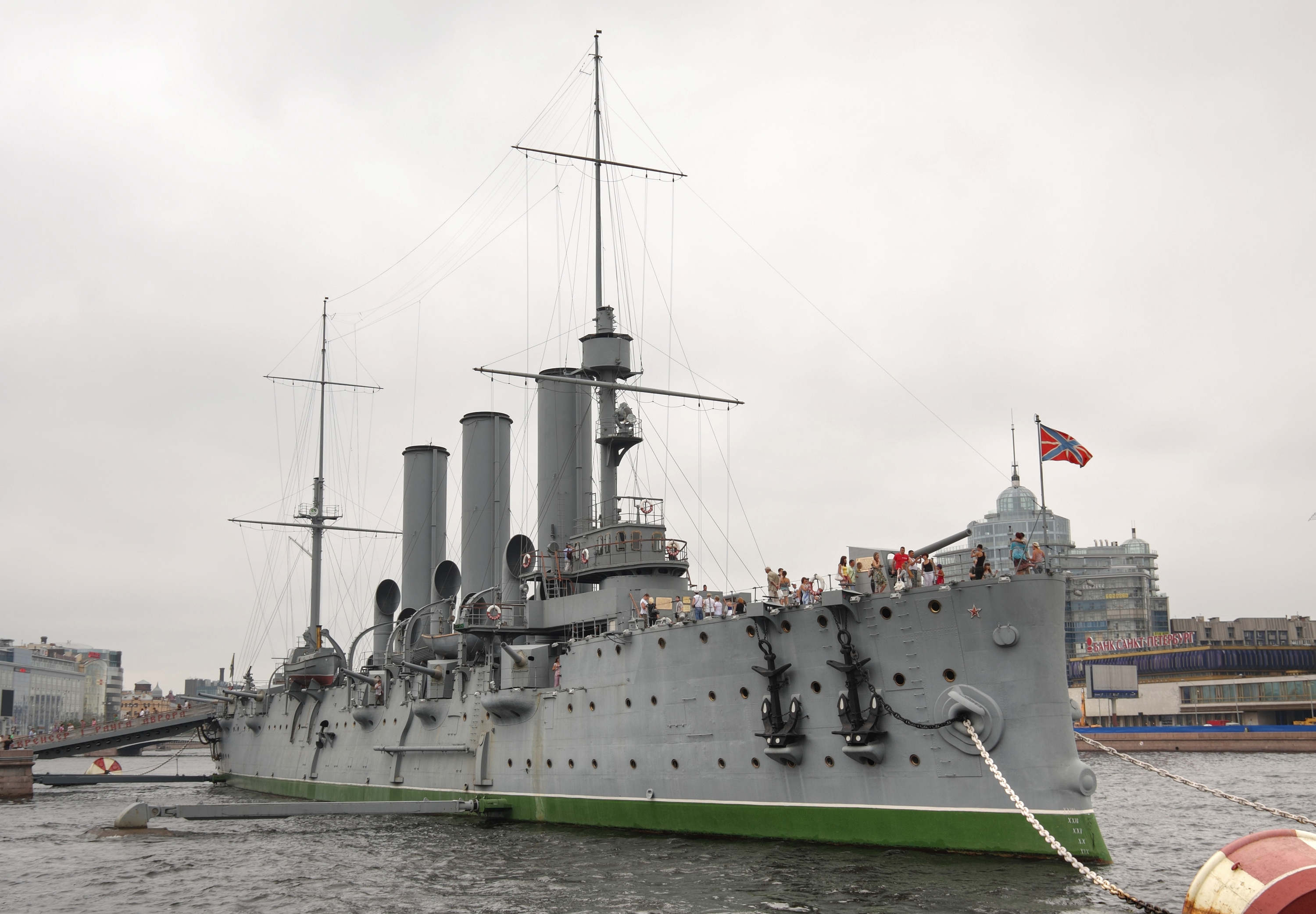
Aurora, preserved as a museum ship in Saint Petersburg, Russia

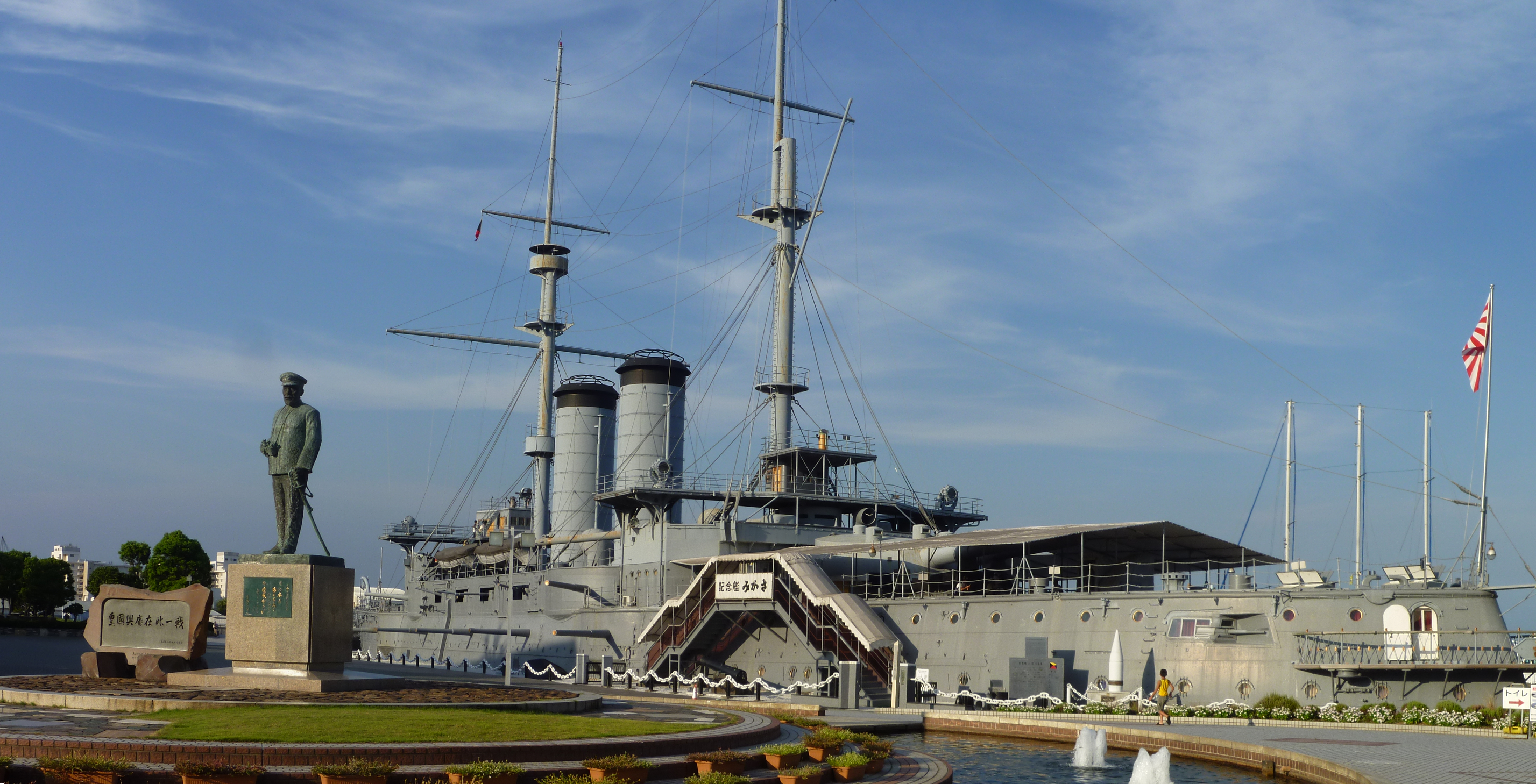
The battleship Mikasa, Admiral Tōgō's flagship at the battle of Tsushima, preserved as a memorial in Yokosuka, Japan

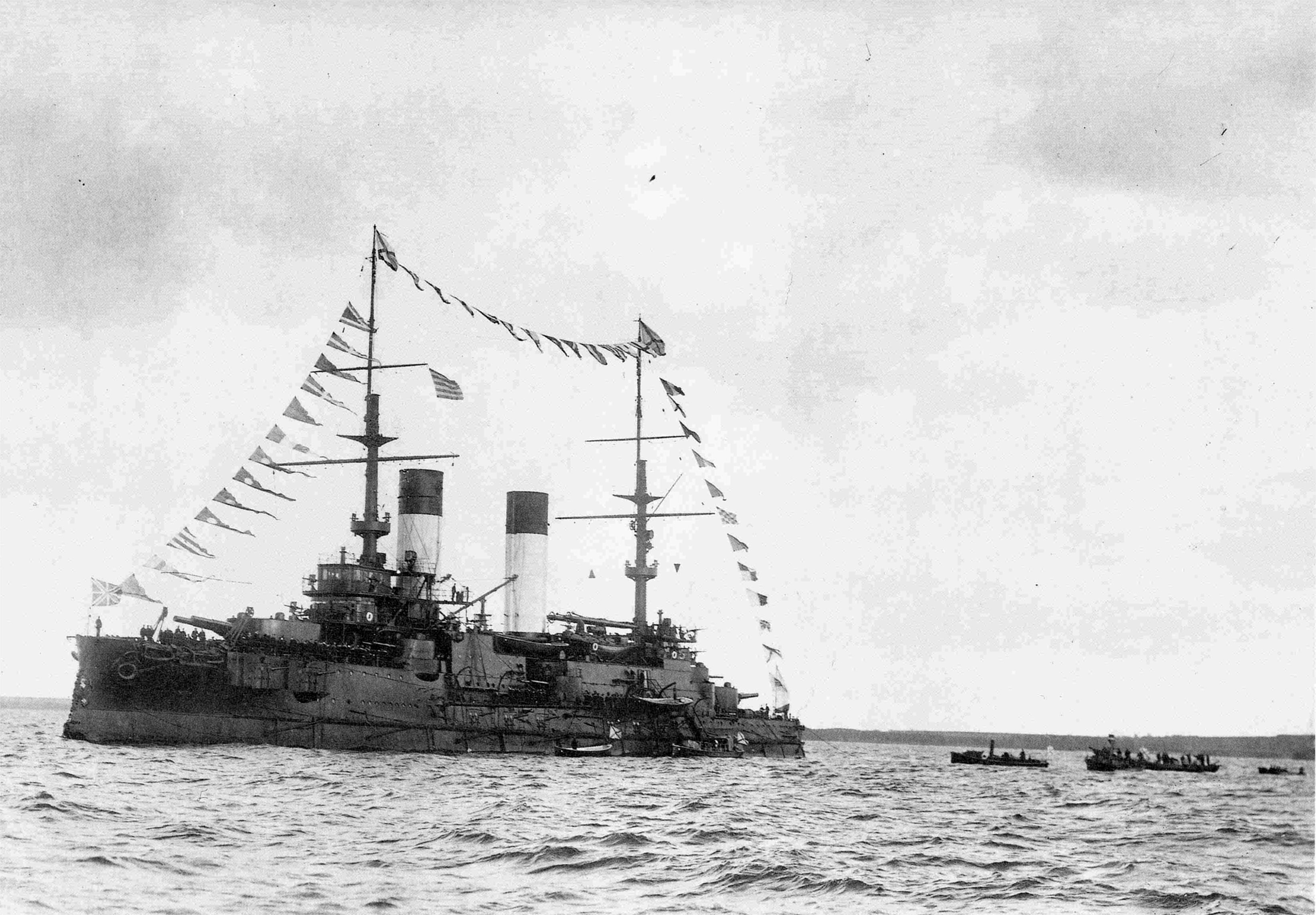
The Russian flagship Knyaz Suvorov was sunk with most of the crew.

Note (Note: There are considerable discrepancies not only between the Russian and Japanese records, but also among the Japanese records on the timeline. This timeline is assembled mostly from the Japanese records.)

27 May 1905 (JST)

- 04:45 The Shinano Maru (Japan) locates the Baltic Fleet. It sends a wireless message "Spotted enemy fleet in grid 203." to cruiser Itsukushima, which relays it to the Combined Fleet flagship Mikasa.
- 05:05 Tōgō receives the message, begins preparation to depart.
- 05:55 Akitsushima relays Izumi's report "Enemy appears to be headed for the Eastern channel of Tsushima."
- 06:05 The 1st (Japanese battleship Mikasa, Shikishima, Fuji, Asahi, Kasuga, Nisshin), 2nd (Izumo, Azuma, Tokiwa, Yakumo, Asama, Iwate) and 4th (Naniwa, Takachiho, Akashi, Tsushima) battle divisions of the Japanese Combined Fleet leave Jinhae (Chinhae, or Chinkai) Bay (Note: 35.0707°N 128.6757°E) head South East at 12 knots. "Weather is half-cloudy, wind from the South West, wave is still high from the stormy weather in the last two days."
- 06:20 "Prepare for battle" ordered on Mikasa.
- 07:00 Cruiser Izumi relieves Shinano Maru of reporting task, closes in to 10,000 metres of Russian battleship Knyaz Suvorov on the starboard, then increases the distance and shadows the Baltic Fleet alone; reports "Enemy fleet is in grid 224 (20 nm NW of Ukushima Island, Nagasaki) heading North North East".
- 08:30 Kasagi reports "3rd battle div. is at grid 251(33.67°N 129.0°E), heading NNE at 10 Knots."
- 09:39 1st battle division reaches 10nm NNE of Mitsushima Lighthouse (Note: 34.7238°N 129.4440°E), turns ESE at 15 knots.
- 10:00 Mikasa sends a wireless message to the Imperial General Headquarters: "Upon receiving its spotting report, Combined Fleet is going into battle with enemy fleet today near Okinoshima Island. Today's weather is fine but waves are high. (Japanese: 本日天気晴朗なれども波高し)".

- 10:30 The 5th battle division (Itsukushima, Matsushima, Hashidate, Chin'en) makes contact with the Baltic Fleet. Stays with the fleet on its left flank (West side).
- 11:00 Details of the Russian fleet formation are assembled: "Head of the fleet, Izumrud. Right (East) flank, 1st column Destroyers, 2nd column Knyaz Suvorov, Borodino-class, Borodino-class, Borodino-class, Oslyabya, Sissoi Veliky, Navarin, Nakhimov; 3rd and 4th columns (slightly behind) Transports and Auxiliaries guarded by destroyers; 5th column (Left flank -West) Nikolai I, Admiral-class coastal battleship, Admiral-class, Admiral-class, Oleg, Aurora, Donskoi, Monomakh".
- 11:30 The 3rd battle division (Kasagi, Chitose, Otowa, Niitaka) makes contact with the Baltic Fleet. Stays with the fleet on its left flank.
- 11:55 Tōgō gathers all hands on the Mikasa rear deck, tells the known situation, and says, "Accurate aim on all the shots is the foremost and the only wish I have at this moment."
- 12:00 Mikasa's chief navigation officer (Note: Nunome Mitsuzō, later Admiral. ja:布目満造) records the current coordinates, 34°27′N 130°1′E.
- 12:00 Russian fleet starts shifting formations. Kasagi and Itsukushima report all the details in radio telegrams: "Right flank Suvorov and 3 Borodino-class; Left flank Oslyabya, Veliky, Navarin, Nakhimov, Nikolai I and Admiral-class ships."
- 12:30 The 6th battle division (Suma, Izumi, Chiyoda, Akitsushima) tails the Baltic Fleet after Suma, Chiyoda and Akitsushima catching up with the shadowing and reporting Izumi.
- 12:38 "Battle stations" ordered on Mikasa.
- 13:30 The Japanese main group (Mikasa, Shikishima, Fuji, Asahi, Kasuga, Nisshin and the 2nd battle division in this order) gains visual contact.
- 13:35 The Russian main group (Suvorov, Aleksandr III, Borodino and Oryol in this order) shifts heading Left (to North (Note: According to a Russian record, "2 point (22.5-degrees) to Port at once".)) to cover the Left column led by Oslyabya.
- 13:39 Mikasa hoists the battle flag, heading SSW, approaching the West side of the Russian Left flank.
- 13:54 Mikasa to the closest Russian ship, Oslyabya: 12,000m. Mikasa sends up the 'Z' flag, meaning "The Empire's fate depends on the result of this battle, let every man do his utmost duty."
- 14:00 Mikasa to Oslyabya: 10,000m. Mikasa turns her helm aport and starts a U-turn with the 5 ships following in sequence to head NNE.
- 14:03 Shikishima to Oslyabya: 9,000m. As Shikishima starts to turn, Oslyabya opens fire.
- 14:07 Fuji to Oslyabya: 8,200m. Fuji completes her turn. Knyaz Suvorov and the Russian Baltic Fleet open fire with their main batteries.
- 14:10 Asahi to Oslyabya: 7,300m. Asahi completes her turn. Mikasa opens fire on Oslyabya with a salvo of 6" test shots to establish a distance baseline. (Note: Japanese navy had found the 6" Armstrong guns to be more accurate than 12" guns, and formalised the procedure to use a 6-inch salvo firing for initial establishment of distance. Armstrong 6" mount had 20° max elevation, enabling 10,000 yards range.)
- 14:12 Kasuga to Oslyabya: 6,500m. Mikasa receives her first hit from the Russian guns. Shikishima, Fuji, Asahi, Kasuga and Nisshin open fire on Oslyabya.
- 14:14 Nisshin to Oslyabya: 6,000m. Oslyabya loses her front mast and the center stack.
- 14:15 Oslyabya is severely set on fire and slows down.
- 14:19 Mikasa to Suvorov: 5,800m. The Japanese main group concentrates fire on the Russian flagship, Knyaz Suvorov, which is now leading the Left column heading NNE.
- 14:25 Mikasa loses top part of rear mast. (Note: With the upper mast, Mikasa lost radio transmission capability due to the loss of antenna. However, Mikasa had lost radio communication capability on 10 August 1904, during the Battle of the Yellow Sea, and was later fitted with two sets of radio equipment (fore and aft). The interruptions (three more times on 27 May, once on the 28th) were kept temporary. In addition, Tōgō had hand semaphore signaling to the immediately following Shikishima for orders to be transmitted by radio as a backup.) Mikasa and her line turns NE and then to East to "cross the T". Russian Left column turns NE and to ESE in response.
- 14:28 Asama is hit by 12-inch shell after engaging with battleship Oslyabya. Steering was disabled, and Asama fell out of formation. Repairs were completed 6 minutes later, and she returned to the 2nd division battle line at 15:15.
- 14:43 Knyaz Suvorov is set on fire and falls away from the battle line.
- 14:50 With the Japanese 1st Battle Div. completely overtaking the Russian battleships heading ESE, Aleksandr turns to the North with Borodino and Oryol following.
- 14:55 Mikasa and the 5 ships make an immediate left U-turn on the spot, and head WNW in reverse order (Nisshin first, Mikasa last). Japanese 2nd Battle Div. continues heading SE and then SW, attacking the secondary Russian warships.
- 15:10 Nisshin to Aleksandr: 4,000m. Oslyabya sinks. Knyaz Suvorov attempts to withdraw.
- 15:14 Asahi to Aleksandr: 3,000m. Aleksandr, apparently giving up fleeing North, turns SE with Borodino and Oryol following.
- 15:18 Asahi to Borodino (heading SE, on opposite course to the Japanese line): 2,500m.
- 15:50 Nisshin and the 5 ships make another immediate U-turn Left, heads NE in normal order (Mikasa first, Nisshin last). Japanese 1st battle div. loses sight of the Russian main group in the battle, due to the smoke and mist.
- 16:45 One torpedo from the Japanese 4th Destroyer Div. hits Knyaz Suvorov in the port side stern, causing her to list about 10 degrees to port.
- 17:00 Japanese 2nd battle div. finds the Russian main group close to where the Japanese 3rd Squadron (5th and 6th battle divs.) was attacking the Russian auxiliaries protected by cruisers.
- 17:30 Russian destroyer Buyniy rescues Admiral Rozhestvensky and his staff from Knyaz Suvorov.
- 17:51 Russian auxiliary cruiser Ural sunk by the 1st battle division bombardment and a torpedo by battleship Shikishima.
- 18:03 Mikasa and the 1st Battle Div. catch up to the remainder of the Russian main group (heading N) in NW, and concentrate fire on the leading Aleksandr III.
- 18:16 Aleksandr III (heading NW) catches major fire. The Japanese main group concentrates fire on Borodino (heading NW).
- 19:03 Imperator Aleksandr III sinks.
- 19:04 Huge explosion occurs in Borodino's stern.
- 19:05 Japanese main group concentrates fire on Oryol (heading NW).
- 19:20 Knyaz Suvorov sinks.
- 19:28 The Sun sets.
- 19:30 Borodino sinks. Russian repair ship Kamchatka sinks.
- 19:30 Leaving the destroyer divisions and torpedo boat flotillas in position to commence attack in the dark, Japanese 1st Battle Division leaves the battleground after ordering 2nd and 4th battle divisions to gather in Matsushima Island area in the North.

28 May 1905 (JST)

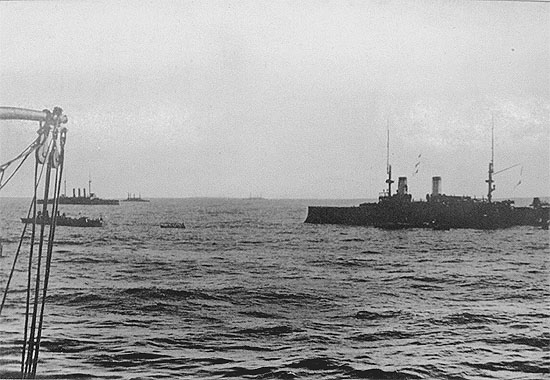
Admiral Nebogatov and Flag Captain Cross leave battleship Imperator Nikolai I on torpedo boat Kiji, heading for battleship Mikasa to meet Admiral Tōgō, at 13:30 on 28 May 1905.

- 05:23 The scout ship of the 5th battle division, Yaeyama, sends "Spotted enemy in grid 603 heading NE" to Itsukushima.
- 05:30 The Japanese Combined Fleet starts assembling a surrounding formation with over 20 capital ships among all the battle divisions.
- 06:00 Damaged Sissoi Veliky and accompanying destroyer Bezuprechni were spotted by Shinano Maru. (Note: Shinano Maru reported "Spotted enemy at grid 456". This message was relayed by the radio station at Ōkawachi observation tower at the north end of Tsushima at 06:55, and the Third Battle Division (IJN cruisers Chitose, Niitaka and Otowa, sans the damaged Kasagi (Note: See #kasagi)) was sent to the area. Sissoi Veliky surrendered to Shinano Maru and Tainan Maru, then capsized and sank at 10:05. Chitose and destroyer Ariake shot and sunk Bezuprechni. Niitaka, Otowa and destroyer Murakumo battled with, and sunk Svetlana. Amerika Maru rescued 290 Russian men in the area.)
- 09:30 Formation is mostly in place. Mikasa and the 1st battle division approach from the North heading South.
- 09:38 Mikasa gains visual contact with the remaining Baltic Fleet in SSE.
- 10:00 Izumrud turns SE and runs at high speed away from the rest of the Russian fleet.
- 10:05 Sissoi Veliky sinks.
- 10:31 Nisshin opens fire at 9,000 m to Nikolai I with Oryol, Apraksin and Seniavin following in this order.
- 10:34 Admiral Nebogatov signals "XGE P", which is "Surrendered. Go still (Proceeding slow)" in the International Code of Signals used at the time.
- 10:40 Mikasa, after changing course to ENE, opens fire at 6,900 m with a starboard salvo 6" test shot. The Russian ships do not return fire.
- 10:42 Kasuga hoists flag signal "enemy surrendered".
- 10:45 Admiral Tōgō accepts the surrender.
- 10:45 Cruiser Svetlana sinks. (Note: See #svetlana)
- 10:50 Mikasa turns South and lowers the battle flag.
- 10:53 Firing stops.
- 11:53 Commander Akiyama Saneyuki and the interpreter (Lieutenant) Yamamoto Shinjirō depart Mikasa and head for Nikolai I on torpedo-boat Kiji.
- 13:37 Kiji returns to Mikasa with Admiral Nebogatov and his staff. Asama commander, Captain Yashiro Rokurō, acts as the interpreter in the Tōgō-Nebogatov meeting.
- 15:00 Damaged Admiral Ushakov arrives at the surrender site, starts firing in an attempt to flee. Iwate and Yakumo are mobilised to intercept.
- 19:00 Admiral Ushakov sinks. (Note: See #ushakov)

== On film ==
The battle has been the main focus of two historical films in Japan. The first, 1969's Battle of the Japan Sea (日本海大海戦, Nihonkai Daikaisen), directed by Seiji Maruyama, starring Toshiro Mifune as Admiral Tōgō, with music by Masaru Sato and special effects by Eiji Tsuburaya. It was dramatised again in 1983's Battle Anthem (日本海大海戦・海ゆかば, Nihonkai Daikaisen – Umi Yukaba) with Mifune reprising his role.

Another, more recent, depiction is episode 4, season 3 of the 2009–2011 NHK taiga drama series Saka no Ue no Kumo (坂の上の雲) (lit. "Clouds Above the Slope").

== See also ==
- Battle of Tsushima order of battle
- Imperial Japanese Navy#Naval Buildup and tensions with Russia
- Baltic Fleet#Russo-Japanese War
- Military attachés and observers in the Russo-Japanese War
- Naval history of Japan
- Nicholas II of Russia

== Bibliography ==
- Bogdanov, M. A. (2004). Eskadrenny bronenosets Sissoi Veliky (Эскадренный броненосец "Сисой Великий") (in Russian). Vol. 1 Stapel Series. Saint Petersburg: M. A. Leonov. ISBN 5-902236-12-6.
- British Assistance (1980). "British Assistance to the Japanese Navy during the Russo-Japanese War of 1904–5". The Great Circle. 2 (1). Armidale: Australian Association for Maritime History: 44–54. April 1980. ISSN 0156-8698. JSTOR 41562319.
- British Naval Attache Reports (2003) [1907]. The Russo-Japanese War 1904–1905. Nashville, TN: The Battery Press. ISBN 0-89839-324-8.
- Brook, Peter (1999). Warships for Export: Armstrong Warships 1867–1927. Gravesend, Kent, UK: World Ship Society. ISBN 0-905617-89-4.
- Busch, Noel F. (1969). The Emperor's Sword: Japan vs. Russia in the Battle of Tsushima. New York: Funk & Wagnall's. ASIN B000KE0F1A.
- Campbell, N.J.M. (1978). Preston, Antony (ed.). "The Battle of Tsu-Shima". Warship. 2 (5). London: Conway Maritime Press. ISBN 0-87021-976-6.
- Chesneau, Roger; Kolesnik, Eugene M. (1979). Conway′s All the World′s Fighting Ships 1860–1905. New York: Mayflower Books. ISBN 0-8317-0302-4.
- Churchill, Sir Winston S. (1927). The World Crisis, Vol. III. London: Scribner's. ASIN B07QWLSWNM. ISBN 1-47422-339-7
- Corbett, Sir Julian (2015a) [1914]. Maritime Operations In The Russo-Japanese War 1904–1905, Vol. 1. Naval Institute Press. ISBN 978-1-59114-197-6.
- Corbett, Sir Julian (2015b) [1915]. Maritime Operations In The Russo-Japanese War 1904–1905, Vol. 2. Naval Institute Press. ISBN 978-1-59114-198-3.
- Dougherty, Martin J., ed. (2012). 100 Battles that Shaped the World. Bath: Parragon Book Service. ISBN 9781445466804.
- Evans, David C; Peattie, Mark R (1997). Kaigun: strategy, tactics, and technology in the Imperial Japanese Navy, 1887–1941. Annapolis, Maryland: Naval Institute Press. ISBN 0-87021-192-7.
- Forczyk, Robert (2009). Russian Battleship vs Japanese Battleship, Yellow Sea 1904–1905. Osprey. ISBN 978-1-84603-330-8.
- Friedman, Norman (2008). Naval Firepower; Battleship Guns and Gunnery in the Dreadnaught Era. Seaforth Publishing. ISBN 978-1-84832-185-4.
- García, Manuel Domecq (1998). A record by Argentine military attaché: Battle of the Sea of Japan (in Japanese). Translated by Katsuji Tsushima. Argentina-Japan Association. ISBN 4-901009-02-8.
- Gardiner, Robert; Budzbon, Przemyslaw (1 May 1985). Gray, Randal (ed.). Conway's All the World's Fighting Ships 1906–1921. London: Naval Institute Press. ISBN 978-0870219078.
- Great Britain Committee of Imperial Defence (1920). Official history, naval and military, of the Russo-Japanese War. Prepared by the Historical section of the Committee of Imperial Defence. Vol. III. London: His Majesty's Stationery Office. ASIN B09XX4WV9R.
- Grove, Eric (1995). Big Fleet Actions: Tsushima-Jutland-Philippine Sea. London: Arms & Armour Press. ISBN 978-1854092816.
- Horne, Alistair (2015). Hubris. The Tragedy of War in the Twentieth Century. HarperCollins. ISBN 978-0-06-239780-5.
- The Hutchinson Unabridged Encyclopedia with Atlas and Weather Guide. Helicon. 2018. ISBN 9781786845689.
- Koenig, William (1977). Epic Sea Battles (2004 revised ed.). London: Octopus Publishing Group Ltd. ISBN 0-7537-1062-5.
- Kowner, Rotem (2006). Historical Dictionary of the Russo-Japanese War. Scarecrow. ISBN 978-0810849273.
- Kowner, Rotem (15 June 2022a). "Time To Remember, Time To Forget: The Battle Of Tsushima In Japanese Collective Memory Since 1905". Asia Pacific Journal. 20 (12–3). ISSN 1557-4660.
- Lardas, Mark (2018). Tsushima 1905: Death of a Russian Fleet. Bloomsbury Publishing. ISBN 9781472826855. Archived from the original on 25 June 2022.
- Launiainen, Petri (6 June 2018). A Brief History of Everything Wireless: How Invisible Waves Have Changed the World. Springer. ISBN 9783319789101.
- Lengerer, Hans (September 2008). Ahlberg, Lars (ed.). "Iwami (ex-Orël)". Contributions to the History of Imperial Japanese Warships (Paper V).(subscription required)
- Mahan, Alfred Thayer (April 1906). "Reflections, Historic and Other, Suggested by the Battle of the Japan Sea". Proceedings. 36 (2). US Naval Institute.
- Massie, Robert K. (1991). Dreadnought: Britain, Germany, and the Coming of the Great War. New York: Random House. ISBN 0-394-52833-6.
- McLaughlin, Stephen (2003). Russian & Soviet Battleships. Annapolis, Maryland: Naval Institute Press. ISBN 1-55750-481-4.
- Michaelis, Anthony (1 January 1965). From Semaphore to Satellite (PDF). Geneva: International Telecommunication Union. ASIN B0006D7IJW.
- Miyanaga, Takashi (March 2004). "Hosei University Academic Repository, The North Sea Incident". Shakai Shirin (in Japanese). 50. doi:10.15002/00021006.
- Nish, Ian (15 August 2022). The Russo-Japanese War, 1904–5: Volume 1. Brill. ISBN 9789004531789.
- Novikov-Priboy, Alexey Silych (1937). "Tsushima" (in Russian).
- Pleshakov, Constantine (2008). The Tsar's Last Armada: The Epic Voyage to the Battle of Tsushima. London: Hachette. ISBN 9780786725496.
- Pleshakov, Konstantin (2002). The Tsar's last armada: the epic journey to the Battle of Tsushima. New York: Basic Books. ISBN 0-465-05792-6.
- Regan, Geoffrey (1992). "The Battle of Tsushima 1905". The Guinness Book of Decisive Battles. Guinness Publishing. ISBN 978-1558594319.
- Semenoff, Captain Vladimir Ivanovich [in Russian] (1907). The Battle of Tsu-Shima. Translated by Lindsay, Captain A. B. (Second ed.). London: John Murray. (Note: Semenoff (1907) and Tsukamoto (1907) are excellent first-hand sources on this battle. Captain 2nd rank V. Semenoff, having experienced Siege of Port Arthur and Battle of the Yellow Sea before this battle, was onboard Knyaz Suvorov as a staff officer to Admiral Rozhestvensky. Accounting Officer Y. Tsukamoto with the rank of 中主計('Chū-Shukei' -accounting officer rank equivalent to Commander) was assigned to Asahi just before this battle for the purpose of recording the battle events.)
- Shiba, Ryōtarō (2014). Clouds Above the Hill. Translated by Cobbing, Andrew (1st ed.). Routledge. ISBN 978-1138858862.
- Sondhaus, Lawrence (2001). Naval Warfare, 1815–1914. New York: Routledge. ISBN 0-41521-477-7.
- Sterling, Christopher H. (2008). Military communications: from ancient times to the 21st century. ABC-CLIO. ISBN 978-1-85109-732-6. Archived from the original on 25 May 2020.
- Thiess, Frank (1954). Tsushima (in German). Rowohlt Verlag. ASIN B0000BOK7K.
- Tikowara, Hesibo; Grant, Robert Francis Sidney (2008). Before Port Arthur in a Destroyer: The Personal Diary of a Japanese Naval Officer. BiblioBazaar. ISBN 978-0554710389. (Note: This is a diary in Japanese translated first into Spanish, which is translated further into English. The author could be Fujiwara Eisaburō (藤原英三郎 1873–1925, later Admiral)."藤原 英三郎" (in Japanese). Archived from the original on 3 September 2023.)
- Tōgō, Heihachirō (September 1905). "Admiral Tōgō's report on the Battle of Tsushima". The Russo-Japanese War Research Society. the Japanese Imperial Navy General Staff. Archived from the original on 20 August 2010.
- 東郷神社復興奉賛会 (ed.). "東郷" [Tōgō]. Tōgō Magazine (in Japanese) (November 1962 - May 1964). Tokyo: 東郷会.
- Tomizawa, Ichiro; Tanaka, Masatomo (May 2005). "The Battle of Tsushima from the View of Information Technology" (PDF). Journal of the Pacific Society. 28 (1). Tokyo. ISBN 0387-4745-01.
- Tsukamoto, Yoshitane (June 1907). Imperial Japanese Navy Records (ed.). "Battle of the Sea of Japan as seen from Battleship Asahi" (in Japanese). Sorokaku Publishing. Archived from the original on 2 April 2016.
- Tuchman, Barbara W. (1962). The Guns of August. Ann Arbor: Macmillan. ISBN 9780026203104
- Turner, Edward Raymond (April 1913). "The Rivalry of Germany and England". The Sewanee Review. 21 (2): 129–147. JSTOR 27532610.
- Ugryumov, Aleksandr (2022). People of Tsushima. Russian sailors in the heroic epic (in Russian). Litres. ISBN 9785044264687.
- Usami, Shozo (2007). Japan as seen from Kasato Maru (in Japanese). Tokyo: Kaibundo Publishing. ISBN 978-4-303-63440-7.
- Vego, Milan N. (2009). Naval War College Press (U.S.) (ed.). Joint Operational Warfare: Theory and Practice. Government Printing Office. p. V2 Historical Companion. ISBN 978-1-884733-62-8.
- Watts, Anthony J. (1990). The Imperial Russian Navy. London: Arms and Armour Press. ISBN 0-85368-912-1.
- Willmott, H. P. (2009). The Last Century of Sea Power: From Port Arthur to Chanak, 1894–1922, Volume 1. Indiana University Press. ISBN 978-0-25300-356-0.
- Wright, Christopher C. (1976). Imperial Russian Cruisers, Part 3. Vol. 2 (International Naval Research Organization. XIII ed.). Toledo, Ohio: Warship International.
