= List of shipwrecks of Asia =

This is a list of shipwrecks located in or around the continent of Asia.

== Arabia ==
=== Bahrain ===
| Ship | Flag | Sunk date | Notes | Coordinates |
|---|---|---|---|---|
| Fifi | Bahrain | Unknown | A tugboat that sank in the 1980s. The wreck is a popular shallow depth dive site. | 26° 9'28.16"N 50°45'18.57"E |
| Unknown | Unknown | 16–17th century | A ship that was sacked and burned along with the Abu Mahir fort on Muharraq Island. The ship's cannons are now kept outside the Bahrain National Museum. | |

=== Qatar ===
| Ship | Flag | Sunk date | Notes | Coordinates |
|---|---|---|---|---|
| Demas Victory | United Arab Emirates | 30 June 2009 | A supply ship that capsized about 10 nautical miles (19 km; 12 mi) off Doha. | |

=== Saudi Arabia ===
| Ship | Flag | Sunk date | Notes | Coordinates |
|---|---|---|---|---|
| Free Enterprise | Egypt | 2004 | A Ro-Pax vessel, later renamed Al Fahad, that was anchored after engine problems and abandoned 14.6 kilometres (9.1 mi) southwest of the old city center of Jeddah. | 21°22′35.67″N 39°07′13.51″E |
| Glen Sannox | Panama | 2000 | A Clyde car ferry built in 1957 which ran aground south of Jeddah. | |
| Saudi Golden Arrow | Unknown | Unknown | A Norwegian ferry, formerly Europafergen, reported to be laid up at Shoieba. | 20°52′02.87″N 39°21′39.77″E |

=== United Arab Emirates ===
| Ship | Flag | Sunk date | Notes | Coordinates |
|---|---|---|---|---|
| Allah Mina | Unknown | Unknown | A cement barge that sank off Dubai. | 25°21′19.7″N 55°12′17.7″E |
| Dara | United Kingdom | 10 April 1961 | An ocean liner that suffered an internal explosion off Dubai, possibly due to an act of sabotage. 238 people were killed, and the ship sank under tow two days later. | 25°34′29″N 55°27′58″E |

=== Yemen ===
| Ship | Flag | Sunk date | Notes | Coordinates |
|---|---|---|---|---|
| Aden | United Kingdom | 1897 | A P&O ship that was lost off Socotra. | |
| Hutton | Unknown | 1882 | A steamboat that was wrecked in the Gulf of Aden. | |
| HMS Khartoum | Royal Navy | 23 June 1940 | A K-class destroyer that caught fire and sank off Perim. | 12°38′0″N 43°24′0″E |

== Bangladesh ==
| Ship | Flag | Sunk date | Notes | Coordinates |
|---|---|---|---|---|
| HMIS Jamnagar | Indian Navy | 29 August 1948 | A coastal trading vessel that ran aground on Domanik Island in the Bay of Bengal. | 21°53′N 90°48′E |

== Brunei ==
| Ship | Flag | Sunk date | Notes | Coordinates |
|---|---|---|---|---|
| USS Salute | United States Navy | 8 June 1945 | An Admirable-class minesweeper that struck a mine in Brunei Bay. | 5°8′N 115°5′E |

== China ==
| Ship | Flag | Sunk date | Notes | Coordinates |
|---|---|---|---|---|
| Amatsukaze | Imperial Japanese Navy | 6 April 1945 | A Kagerō-class destroyer that was sunk by US aircraft east of Amoy. | 24°30′N 118°10′E |
| SMS Cormoran | Imperial German Navy | 28 September 1914 | A Bussard-class cruiser that was scuttled at Tsingtau to prevent capture. | 36.0500°N 120.2667°E |
| Dashun | China | November 1999 | A ferry that ran between Dalian and Yantai. It caught fire and capsized off Yantai, Shandong, killing at least 280. | |
| Dingyuan | Imperial Chinese Navy | 10 February 1895 | A pre-dreadnought battleship that was scuttled after taking damage in the Battle of Weihaiwei. | 37°30′1.68″N 122°10′48.57″E |
| Dongfang zhi Xing | China | 1 June 2015 | A cruise ship that ran between Nanjing and Chongqing. It capsized on the Yangtze River after being hit by a downburst in Jianli County, Jingzhou, Hubei, killing 442. | 29.7592181°N 112.9227229°E |
| Huaguangjiao One | Unknown | Unknown | A Chinese merchant vessel built during the Southern Song dynasty (1127–1279). It was discovered in 1996, and was the first vessel China discovered in the open seas. | 16°16′16″N 111°34′03″E |
| Jingyuan | Imperial Chinese Navy | 17 September 1894 | An armored cruiser that was sunk in the Battle of the Yalu River. | 39°12′50″N 123°07′35″E |
| Jiyuan | Imperial Chinese Navy | 30 November 1904 | A protected cruiser that struck a mine off the Lüshunkou District. | 38°51′N 121°05′E |
| Kaimon | Imperial Chinese Navy | 5 July 1904 | A sloop-of-war that struck a mine off Lüshunkou. | 38°50′N 121°50′E |
| Laiyuan | Imperial Chinese Navy | 5 February 1895 | An armored cruiser that was sunk in the Battle of Weihaiwei. | 37.497°N 122.171°E |
| Nan'ao One | Unknown | Unknown | A late Ming dynasty (1368–1644) merchant ship, the first ever found in the South China Seas. | 23°40′N 117°20′E |
| Nanhai One | Unknown | Unknown | A Chinese merchant vessel which sank off the south coast during the Southern Song dynasty, between 1127 and 1279. | 21°34′34″N 111°52′08″E |
| Ōshima | Imperial Japanese Navy | 18 May 1904 | A gunboat that collided with Akagi in heavy fog off Lüshunkou. | 39°01′N 121°08′E |
| Petropavlovsk | Imperial Russian Navy | 13 April 1904 | A Petropavlovsk-class battleship that was sunk by a mine in the Yellow Sea. | |
| Red Star 312 | China | March 1983 | A ferry on the Guangzhou–Zhaoqing route. It capsized in thunderstorm at Shanshui, Guangdong, with at least 147 people confirmed dead. | |
| Rong Jian | China | June 2000 | Capsized in Yangtze River, Hejiang, Sichuan, with at least 131 people confirmed dead. | |
| Sevastopol | Imperial Russian Navy | 2 January 1905 | A Petropavlovsk-class battleship that was scuttled in the Yellow Sea to avoid capture. | |
| Wanjiao One | Unknown | Unknown | An ancient Chinese merchant ship dating back to the reign of the Kangxi Emperor (1654–1722) of the Qing dynasty. | 22°16′N 111°03′E |

== East Timor ==
| Ship | Flag | Sunk date | Notes | Coordinates |
|---|---|---|---|---|
| HMAS Armidale | Royal Australian Navy | 1 December 1942 | A Bathurst-class corvette that was sunk by Japanese aircraft off Betano Bay. | 9°9′52″S 125°43′30″E |
| HMAS Voyager | Royal Australian Navy | 23 September 1942 | A W-class destroyer that ran aground at Betano Bay. | 9°15′S 125°45′E |

== Hong Kong ==
See also: List of Shipwrecks of Hong Kong

| Ship | Flag | Sunk date | Notes | Coordinates |
|---|---|---|---|---|
| Bokhara | United Kingdom | 10 October 1892 | A steamship that sank in a typhoon, killing 125 people on board. | |
| Fatshan | Hong Kong | 17 August 1971 | A ferry that sank near Lantau Island during the height of Typhoon Rose; of the 92 on board, only 4 people survived. | |
| Lamma IV | Hong Kong | 1 October 2012 | A ferry that collided with another ferry off Lamma Island, killing 39 of the 127 on board. | 22°14′08″N 114°06′14″E |
| Neftegaz-67 | Ukraine | 22 March 2008 | A Ukrainian anchor handling tug supply vessel which sank after colliding with China-registered bulk carrier Yao Hai east of Brothers Island. The wreck was salvaged on 27 April 2008. | |
| RMS Queen Elizabeth | United Kingdom | 9 January 1972 | An ocean liner that caught fire in mysterious circumstances, and was capsized by the water used to fight the fire. The wreck now lies buried beneath Container Terminal 9. | 22°19.717′N 114°06.733′E |

== India ==
| Ship | Flag | Sunk date | Notes | Coordinates |
|---|---|---|---|---|
| PNS Ghazi | Pakistan Navy | 4 December 1971 | A Tench-class submarine that sank in unknown circumstances off Visakhapatnam, during the Indo-Pakistani War. | |
| The Kadakkarapally Boat | Unknown | 11–12th century | A wreck that was discovered in a coconut grove near Kadakkarappally, Kerala, that dates from around 1020–1160 AD. | |
| INS Khukri | Indian Navy | 9 December 1971 | A Blackwood-class frigate that was torpedoed by the Pakistan Navy submarine PNS Hangor off Diu, India. | 20°16′38″N 70°59′37″E |
| Stakesby | United Kingdom | 31 July 1949 | A cargo ship that became stranded in the Karnaphuli River, Chittagong. | |

== Indonesia ==
| Ship | Flag | Sunk date | Notes | Coordinates |
|---|---|---|---|---|
| HMS Alceste | Royal Navy | 22 February 1817 | An Armide-class frigate that was wrecked in the Java Sea. | |
| Amagiri | Imperial Japanese Navy | 23 April 1944 | A Fubuki-class destroyer that struck a mine near Balikpapan. | 02°10′S 116°45′E |
| Aquila | Italy | 27 May 1958 | A cargo ship that was bombed and sunk by the CIA while anchored at Ambon, Maluku, as part of a covert operation to drive foreign trade from Indonesian waters. | |
| Asagumo | Imperial Japanese Navy | 25 October 1944 | An Asashio-class destroyer that was torpedoed by USS McDermut at the Battle of Surigao Strait. | 01°59′S 104°56′E |
| Ashigara | Imperial Japanese Navy | 8 June 1945 | A Myōkō-class heavy cruiser that was torpedoed off the Bangka–Belitung Islands. | 01°59′S 104°56′E |
| Belitung shipwreck | Unknown | 830 CE (Approximately) | The wreck of an Arabian dhow that sank off Belitung Island | 2°45′39.00″S 107°35′42.66″E |
| USS Bullhead | United States Navy | 6 August 1945 | A Balao-class submarine that was sunk by Japanese aircraft in the Java Sea. | |
| HNLMS De Ruyter | Royal Netherlands Navy | 28 February 1942 | A light cruiser torpedoed by Haguro in the Battle of the Java Sea. | 5°58′55″S 112°3′57″E |
| USS Edsall | United States Navy | 1 March 1942 | A Clemson-class destroyer that was sunk by Japanese forces in the Java Sea. | 13°45′S 106°45′E |
| HMS Electra | Royal Navy | 27 February 1942 | An E-class destroyer that was sunk in the Battle of the Java Sea. | 5°0′S 111°0′E |
| HMS Encounter | Royal Navy | 1 March 1942 | An E-class destroyer that was sunk in the Second Battle of the Java Sea. | |
| HMS Exeter | Royal Navy | 1 March 1942 | A York-class heavy cruiser that was sunk in the Second Battle of the Java Sea. | |
| Friendship | Great Britain | 28 October 1788 | A First Fleet transport ship that was scuttled in Makassar Strait. | |
| Hayanami | Imperial Japanese Navy | 7 June 1944 | A Yūgumo-class destroyer that was torpedoed by USS Harder near Tawi-Tawi. | 04°43′N 120°03′E |
| Hokaze | Imperial Japanese Navy | 6 July 1944 | A Minekaze-class destroyer that was sunk by USS Paddle. | 03°24′N 125°28′E |
| USS Houston | United States Navy | 1 March 1942 | A Northampton-class heavy cruiser that was sunk in the Battle of Sunda Strait. | 5°48′45″S 106°7′55″E |
| I-60 | Imperial Japanese Navy | 17 January 1942 | A Kaidai-type submarine that was sunk by HMS Jupiter west of Krakatoa. | 06°19′30″S 104°49′20″E |
| Inazuma | Imperial Japanese Navy | 14 May 1944 | A Fubuki-class destroyer that was sunk by USS Bonefish. | 5°8′N 119°38′E |
| Isonami | Imperial Japanese Navy | 9 April 1943 | A Fubuki-class destroyer that was torpedoed by USS Tautog southeast of Wangiwangi Island. | 5°26′S 123°4′E |
| Isuzu | Imperial Japanese Navy | 7 April 1945 | A Nagara-class light cruiser that was sunk near Bima. | 07°38′S 118°09′E |
| Itsukushima | Imperial Japanese Navy | 7 October 1944 | A minelayer that was torpedoed by HNLMS Zwaardvisch off Bawean. | 5°23′S 113°48′E |
| HNLMS Java | Royal Netherlands Navy | 27 February 1942 | A Java-class cruiser that was sunk by Nachi in the Battle of the Java Sea. | 6°00′01″S 112°05′00″E |
| Junyō Maru | Imperial Japanese Navy | 18 September 1944 | A "hell ship" that was sunk by HMS Tradewind, with over 5,000 deaths. | 2°53′S 101°11′E |
| HMS Jupiter | Royal Navy | 27 February 1942 | A J-class destroyer that hit a mine off the north coast of Java. | 6°45′S 112°6′E |
| HNLMS K VII | Royal Netherlands Navy | 18 February 1942 | A K V-class submarine that was bombed by Japanese aircraft in Surabaya harbour. | |
| HNLMS K XVIII | Royal Netherlands Navy | 16 June 1945 | A K XIV-class submarine that was sunk by HMS Taciturn off Surabaya. | 06°48′S 112°47′E |
| HNLMS Kortenaer | Royal Netherlands Navy | 27 February 1942 | An Admiralen-class destroyer that was torpedoed by Haguro in the Battle of the Java Sea. | 6°29′S 112°05′E |
| Lammermuir | United Kingdom | 31 December 1863 | An extreme clipper that was wrecked on Amherst Reef in Gaspar Strait. | |
| USS Langley | United States Navy | 27 February 1942 | An aircraft carrier that was attacked by Japanese dive bombers and scuttled off Cilacap Regency. | 8°51′S 109°2′E |
| Levina 1 | Indonesia | 25 February 2007 | A passenger ferry that caught fire on 22 February, and sank three days later with a group of journalists and investigators aboard. | |
| USAT Liberty | United States Army | 11 January 1942 | A troopship that was torpedoed by I-166 and beached at Tulamben, Bali. | 8°017′03″S 115°035′021″E |
| HMS Li Wo | Royal Navy | 14 February 1942 | An auxiliary patrol vessel that was sunk by a convoy of Japanese warships. | |
| Memnon | United States | September 1851 | A clipper that was lost in the Gaspar Strait. | |
| Minazuki | Imperial Japanese Navy | 6 June 1944 | A Mutsuki-class destroyer that was sunk by USS Harder. | 04°05′N 119°30′E |
| Nadakaze | Imperial Japanese Navy | 25 July 1945 | A Minekaze-class destroyer that was torpedoed by HMS Stubborn near Lombok Strait. | 07°06′S 115°42′E |
| Natsushio | Imperial Japanese Navy | 9 February 1942 | A Kagerō-class destroyer that was torpedoed by USS S-37 near Makassar. | 05°10′S 119°24′E |
| No. 2 | Imperial Japanese Navy | 27 June 1945 | A No.1-class submarine chaser that was sunk by USS Blueback. | 07°30′S 116°15′E |
| Ocean | East India Company | 5 February 1797 | An East Indiaman that struck a reef and was scuttled off Kalatea. | 7°9′S 121°00′E |
| USS Perch | United States Navy | 3 March 1942 | A Porpoise-class submarine that took damage and was scuttled off Madura Island. | 6°30′S 113°50′E |
| HMAS Perth | Royal Australian Navy | 1 March 1942 | A Leander-class light cruiser that was torpedoed in the Battle of Sunda Strait. | 05°51′42″S 106°7′52″E |
| USS Pope | United States Navy | 1 March 1942 | A Clemson-class destroyer that was sunk in the Second Battle of the Java Sea. | |
| USS S-36 | United States Navy | 21 January 1942 | An S-class submarine that ran aground on a reef and was scuttled. | 4°57′N 118°31′E |
| San Flaviano | United Kingdom | 28 April 1958 | A British oil tanker that was bombed and sunk at Balikpapan, East Kalimantan. The attack was orchestrated by the CIA, in support of a local rebellion. | |
| Senopati Nusantara | Indonesia | 30 December 2006 | A passenger ferry that sank in a storm in the Java Sea, with 400–500 dead. | |
| Sierra Cordoba | United States | 31 December 1941 | A cargo liner that was sunk by a Japanese flying boat. | 1°00′N 119°10′E |
| KMP Tampomas II | Indonesia | 27 January 1981 | An Indonesian passenger ship that sank near Masalembu Island, Java Sea, with an estimated loss of 431 dead. | 5°30′S 114°26′E |
| Tōhō Maru | Imperial Japanese Navy | 29 March 1943 | An oil tanker that was torpedoed by USS Gudgeon in the Makassar Strait. | 00°00′N 118°19′E |
| Tsugaru | Imperial Japanese Navy | 29 June 1944 | A minelayer that was sunk by USS Darter near Tobelo. | 2°19′N 127°57′E |
| U-183 | Kriegsmarine | 23 April 1945 | A Type IXC/40 U-boat that was sunk by USS Besugo in the Java Sea. | 4.833°S 112.867°E |
| U-537 | Kriegsmarine | 10 November 1944 | A Type IXC/40 U-boat that was sunk in the Java Sea. | 7°13′S 115°17′E |
| HNLMS Van Ghent | Royal Netherlands Navy | 15 February 1942 | An Admiralen-class destroyer that ran aground and was scuttled off Belitung. | 3.08333°S 107.35°E |
| HNLMS Van Nes | Royal Netherlands Navy | 17 February 1942 | An Admiralen-class destroyer that was sunk by Japanese aircraft south of Bangka Island. | 3°27′S 106°38′E |

== Japan ==
| Ship | Flag | Sunk date | Notes | Coordinates |
|---|---|---|---|---|
| Admiral Nakhimov | Imperial Russian Navy | 28 May 1905 | An armored cruiser that was sunk off Tsushima Island. | |
| Admiral Ushakov | Imperial Russian Navy | 28 May 1905 | A Russian battleship that was scuttled after taking damage at the Battle of Tsushima. | 34°34′N 129°32′E |
| Aki | Imperial Japanese Navy | 7 September 1924 | A Satsuma-class battleship that was sunk as a target near Minamibōsō, Chiba. | 35.025°N 139.856°E |
| Aoba | Imperial Japanese Navy | 28 July 1945 | An Aoba-class heavy cruiser that was sunk by US aircraft at Kure. | |
| Aoba Maru | Japan | June 1949 | A regular route ferry between Matsuyama and Kitakyushu that capsized in Typhoon Della off Kunisaki Peninsula, Inland Sea, with at least 133 people confirmed dead. | |
| Ariel | United States | 1917 | A schooner that was wrecked off Inubōsaki Lighthouse. | |
| USS Bates | United States Navy | 25 May 1945 | A Buckley-class destroyer escort that was sunk by Japanese aircraft south of Iejima. | 26°41′N 127°47′E |
| Borodino | Imperial Russian Navy | 27 May 1905 | A Russian battleship that was sunk at the Battle of Tsushima. | |
| Chishima | Imperial Japanese Navy | 30 November 1892 | An unprotected cruiser that collided with Ravenna off Matsuyama. | 33°55′N 132°39′E |
| Chiyoda | Imperial Japanese Navy | 5 August 1927 | A protected cruiser that was sunk as a target in Bungo Channel. | 32.909°N 132.25°E |
| Dakota | United States | 3 March 1907 | An American passenger ship which struck a reef off Yokohama. | |
| USS Emmons | United States Navy | 6 April 1945 | A Gleaves-class destroyer that was sunk by kamikaze aircraft off Okinawa. | 26°48′N 128°04′E |
| Ertuğrul | Ottoman Navy | 18 September 1890 | An Ottoman frigate that foundered in bad weather and ran aground on the east coast of Kii Ōshima, while returning to Turkey after a voyage of friendship to Japan. | |
| USS Greene | United States Navy | 9 October 1945 | A Clemson-class destroyer that was sunk by Typhoon Louise. | |
| I-58 | Imperial Japanese Navy | 1 April 1946 | A B3 type cruiser submarine that was scuttled off the Gotō Islands. | 32°37′N 129°17′E |
| I-157 | Imperial Japanese Navy | 1 April 1946 | A Kaidai-type submarine that was scuttled east of Gotō, Nagasaki. | 32°37′N 129°17′E |
| Imperator Aleksandr III | Imperial Russian Navy | 27 May 1905 | A Russian battleship that was sunk in the Battle of Tsushima. | |
| Kazu I | Japan | 23 April 2022 | Tour boat sank off of Shiretoko Peninsula, 10 dead and 16 missing. | |
| Kamikaze | Imperial Japanese Navy | 7 June 1946 | A Kamikaze-class destroyer that ran aground off Omaezaki. | 34°38′N 138°8′E |
| Kawachi | Imperial Japanese Navy | 12 July 1918 | A Kawachi-class battleship that capsized after an explosion caused by spontaneous ignition at Tokuyama, Yamaguchi, western Honshū. | |
| Kiche Maru | Japan | 22 September 1912 | A Japanese passenger ship that sank in a storm with over 1,000 passengers lost. | |
| Kitagawa Maru No.5 | Japan | April 1957 | A Japanese wooden passenger boat that capsized off Onomichi, Inland Sea, killing at least 113. | |
| Knyaz Suvorov | Imperial Russian Navy | 27 May 1905 | A Russian battleship that was sunk at the Battle of Tsushima. | |
| Lisbon Maru | Imperial Japanese Navy | 2 October 1942 | A troopship and prisoner-of-war transport that was torpedoed by USS Grouper off Zhoushan. | 30.23°N 122.765°E |
| Nagara | Imperial Japanese Navy | 7 August 1944 | A Nagara-class light cruiser that was torpedoed by USS Croaker off Amakusa. | 32°09′N 129°53′E |
| Nankai Maru | Japan | January 1958 | A ferry between Wakayama and Tokushima that capsized off southern Awaji Island, killing at least 167. | |
| Nisshin | Imperial Japanese Navy | 18 January 1942 | A Kasuga-class armored cruiser that was sunk as a target southwest of Kure. | 34°05′N 132°53′E |
| Nossa Senhora da Graça | Portugal | 6 January 1610 | A Portuguese carrack that was sunk by its own captain in the mouth of Nagasaki Bay after being boarded by Japanese samurai and set on fire. | |
| Numakaze | Imperial Japanese Navy | 18 December 1943 | A Minekaze-class destroyer that was sunk northeast of Naha. | 26°29′N 128°26′E |
| Okikaze | Imperial Japanese Navy | 10 January 1943 | A Minekaze-class destroyer that was torpedoed by USS Trigger southeast of Yokosuka. | 35°02′N 140°12′E |
| Oslyabya | Imperial Russian Navy | 27 May 1905 | A Russian battleship that was sunk in the Battle of Tsushima. | |
| Otowa | Imperial Japanese Navy | 10 August 1917 | A protected cruiser that ran aground and broke apart off Shima. | 34°14′N 136°53′E |
| Seiki | Imperial Japanese Navy | 10 December 1888 | A screw sloop that ran aground in Suruga Bay. | 35°07′N 138°40′E |
| Sekirei Maru | Japan | December 1945 | A passenger boat that capsized in stormy conditions off Akashi, Hyogo, with at least 304 people confirmed dead. | |
| Shiun Maru | Japan | May 1955 | A ferry that capsized and sank during fog off Takamatsu, Shikoku, killing at least 168. | |
| Sissoi Veliky | Imperial Russian Navy | 28 May 1905 | A Russian battleship that was sunk in the Battle of Tsushima. | |
| USS Skylark | United States Navy | 28 April 1945 | An Auk-class minesweeper that struck a mine off Hagushi. | 26°20′N 127°40′E |
| USS Swallow | United States Navy | 22 April 1945 | An Auk-class minesweeper that was sunk by kamikaze aircraft off Okinawa. | 26°10′N 127°12′E |
| USS Tang | United States Navy | 24 October 1944 | A Balao-class submarine that was sunk by her own torpedo in the Taiwan Strait. | 25°6′N 119°31′E |
| Tarumizu Maru No.6 | Japan | February 1944 | A regular route ferry between Tarumizu and Kagoshima that capsized off Kagoshima Bay, with at least 464 people confirmed dead. | |
| Thor | Kriegsmarine | 30 November 1942 | An auxiliary cruiser that was destroyed by fire while moored at Yokohama, and abandoned. | 35°23′50″N 139°38′50″E |
| USS Thornton | United States Navy | 2 May 1945 | A Clemson-class destroyer that was beached in the Ryukyu Islands after taking damage in a collision. | |
| Tofuku Maru | Imperial Japanese Navy | 24 December 1943 | A hell ship that was torpedoed by USS Gurnard off the east coast of Honshu. | 34°02′N 136°19′E |
| Tokiwa Maru | Japan | 19 June 1943 | A regular route ferry between Naruto and Kobe. It capsized in a collision with the cargo ship Richmond Maru off Kobe, with at least 47 confirmed dead. | |
| Tosa | Imperial Japanese Navy | 9 February 1925 | A Tosa-class battleship that was scuttled south of Mizunokojima Lighthouse. | |
| Tōya Maru | Japan | 26 September 1954 | A train ferry that sank in a typhoon off Hakodate, resulting in around 1,153 deaths. | 41.1932°N 140.152°E |
| Toyo Maru No 10 | Japan | November 1945 | A passenger ferry sank by overloaded three times capacity, off Hakata Island, Seto Inland Sea, at least 397 persons confirmed dead. | |
| Tsushima Maru | Japan | 22 August 1944 | A passenger ship that was sunk by USS Bowfin off Akusekijima, killing 1,484 civilians, including 767 schoolchildren. | 29°32′33″N 129°33′30″E |
| Vladimir Monomakh | Imperial Russian Navy | 28 May 1905 | An armored cruiser that was damaged by Japanese torpedo boats and scuttled off Tsushima Island. | 34°32′N 129°40′E |

== Lebanon ==
| Ship | Flag | Sunk date | Notes | Coordinates |
|---|---|---|---|---|
| Danny F II | Panama | 17 December 2009 | A livestock carrier that capsized 11 nautical miles (20 km; 13 mi) from Tripoli, resulting in the death of nearly 30,000 sheep and cattle. | |
| HMS Victoria | Royal Navy | 22 June 1893 | A British battleship that collided with HMS Camperdown near Tripoli. | |

== Malaysia ==
| Ship | Flag | Sunk date | Notes | Coordinates |
|---|---|---|---|---|
| Atago Maru | Imperial Japanese Navy | 28 November 1944 | A merchant vessel that was sunk off Miri, Sarawak. | 04°29′N 114°00′E |
| Awazisan Maru | Imperial Japanese Navy | 8 December 1941 | A World War II Japanese troopship that was bombed and sunk off the coast of Kota Bharu. | |
| Haguro | Imperial Japanese Navy | 16 May 1945 | A Myōkō-class cruiser that was sunk in the Strait of Malacca by gunfire and torpedoes from Royal Navy destroyers. | |
| Hatsutaka | Imperial Japanese Navy | 16 May 1945 | A Hatsutaka-class minelayer that was torpedoed by USS Hawkbill off Pulau Tenggol. | 04°49′N 103°31′E |
| Kuma | Imperial Japanese Navy | 11 January 1944 | A Kuma-class light cruiser that was torpedoed by HMS Tally-Ho off Penang. | 05°26′N 99°52′E |
| Kuroshio Maru | Japan | March 1960 | A tanker that was sunk as a target off Aur Island. | 2°33′N 104°40′E |
| HMS Prince of Wales | Royal Navy | 10 December 1941 | A King George V-class battleship that was launched in 1939 and sunk by Japanese bombers, along with HMS Repulse. | 3°34′N 104°26′E |
| HMS Repulse | Royal Navy | 10 December 1941 | A Renown-class battlecruiser that was launched in 1916, and sunk by Japanese bombers, along with HMS Prince of Wales. | 3°34′N 104°26′E |
| HMS Stratagem | Royal Navy | 22 November 1944 | An S-class submarine that was sunk by a Japanese submarine chaser near Batu Pahat. | 1°36′N 102°53′E |

Nine historic trade ships carrying ceramics dating back to the 10th century until the 19th century were excavated under Swedish engineer Sten Sjöstrand in the South China Sea.

- Royal Nanhai (circa 1460), found in 1995
- Nanyang (circa 1380), found in 1995
- Xuande (circa 1540), found in 1995
- Longquan (circa 1400), found in 1996
- Turiang (circa 1370), found in 1996
- Singtai (circa 1550), found in 1998
- Desaru (circa 1830), found in 2001
- Tanjong Simpang (AD 960- 1127), found in 2001
- Wanli (early 17th century), found in 2003

== Myanmar ==
| Ship | Flag | Sunk date | Notes | Coordinates |
|---|---|---|---|---|
| HMIS Indus | Indian Navy | 6 April 1942 | A Grimsby-class sloop that was bombed by Japanese aircraft off Akyab. | 20°7′N 92°54′E |

== Pakistan ==
| Ship | Flag | Sunk date | Notes | Coordinates |
|---|---|---|---|---|
| PNS Khaibar | Pakistan Navy | 4 December 1971 | A Battle-class destroyer that was sunk by he Indian Navy missile boat INS Nirghat south of Karachi, Pakistan. | |

== Philippines ==
| Ship | Flag | Sunk date | Notes | Coordinates |
|---|---|---|---|---|
| Abukuma | Imperial Japanese Navy | 26 October 1944 | A Nagara-class light cruiser that was bombed by US aircraft off Negros Island. | 09°20′N 122°32′E |
| Akebono | Imperial Japanese Navy | 14 November 1944 | A Fubuki-class destroyer that was bombed by US aircraft at Cavite, in an attack which also sunk Akishimo. | 14°35′N 120°55′E |
| Akigumo | Imperial Japanese Navy | 11 April 1944 | A Kagerō-class destroyer that was torpedoed by USS Redfin southeast of Zamboanga Peninsula. | 06°43′N 122°23′E |
| Akishimo | Imperial Japanese Navy | 14 November 1944 | A Yūgumo-class destroyer that was bombed by US aircraft at Cavite, in an attack which also sunk Akebono. | 14°35′N 120°55′E |
| Akitsushima | Imperial Japanese Navy | 24 September 1944 | A Japanese seaplane tender that was sunk at Coron Island. | |
| Asakaze | Imperial Japanese Navy | 23 August 1944 | A Kamikaze-class destroyer that was torpedoed by USS Haddo southwest of Bolinao. | 16°6′N 119°44′E |
| Asia South Korea | Philippines | 22 December 1999 | A passenger ferry that sank off Bantayan Island. | |
| Awa Maru | Imperial Japanese Navy | 1 April 1945 | A hospital ship that was sunk off the coast of Camiguin by USS Queenfish, who mistook her for a destroyer. | |
| USS Barbel | United States Navy | 4 February 1945 | A Balao-class submarine that was sunk by Japanese aircraft off Palawan. | 7°49′N 116°47′E |
| Castilla | Spanish Navy | 1 May 1898 | An Aragon-class cruiser sunk in the Battle of Manila Bay. | |
| Cebu City | Philippines | 2 December 1994 | A ferry that capsized in a collision with the freighter Kota Suria off Manila Bay, with 140 people confirmed dead. | |
| China Maru | Japan | 21 September 1944 | A cargo ship that was sunk by US aircraft off Manila. | 14°35′N 120°55′E |
| USS Cooper | United States Navy | 3 December 1944 | An Allen M. Sumner-class destroyer that was sunk in the Battle of Ormoc Bay. | 10°54′N 124°36′E |
| USS Darter | United States Navy | 24 October 1944 | A Gato-class submarine that ran aground and was scuttled off Palawan. | 9.406°N 116.984°E |
| Doña Marilyn | Philippines | 24 October 1988 | A ferry that was caught in Typhoon Ruby off Almagro, Samar. Estimates of the number of dead vary from 50 to 150. | |
| Dumaguete J | Philippines | October 1968 | A motor vessel carrying 500 people that capsized off Zamboanga, Mindanao. At least 300 were confirmed dead. | |
| USS Flier | United States Navy | 13 August 1944 | A Gato-class submarine that struck a mine in the Balabac Strait. | 7°58′43.21″N 117°15′23.79″E |
| Fujinami | Imperial Japanese Navy | 27 October 1944 | A Yūgumo-class destroyer that was sunk by US aircraft 80 miles (130 km) north of Iloilo. | 12°0′N 122°30′E |
| Hamanami | Imperial Japanese Navy | 11 November 1944 | A Yūgumo-class destroyer that was sunk by US aircraft west of Leyte. | 10°50′N 124°35′E |
| USS Harder | United States Navy | 24 August 1944 | A Gato-class submarine that was sunk off Dasol. | |
| Hatsuharu | Imperial Japanese Navy | 13 November 1944 | A Hatsuharu-class destroyer that was sunk in an air raid at Manila Bay. | 14°35′N 120°50′E |
| USS Hoel | United States Navy | 25 October 1944 | A Fletcher-class destroyer that was sunk in the Battle off Samar. | 11°46′N 126°33′E |
| USS Hovey | United States Navy | 7 January 1945 | A Clemson-class destroyer that was sunk in the Invasion of Luzon. | 16°20′N 120°10′E |
| USS Indianapolis | United States Navy | 30 July 1945 | A Portland-class cruiser that was torpedoed by Japanese submarine I-58 from the south of Philippine Sea. | 12°2′N 134°48′E |
| Irako | Imperial Japanese Navy | 24 September 1944 | A food supply ship that was scuttled at Coron Island after taking damage in an attack by aircraft of Task Force 38. | 08°04′N 152°40′E |
| Isuzu Maru | Imperial Japanese Navy | Unknown | A transport ship that was sunk by USS Trout off the north coast of Marinduque Island. | |
| USS Johnston | United States Navy | 25 October 1944 | A Fletcher-class destroyer | 11°45′N 126°08′E |
| Kazagumo | Imperial Japanese Navy | 8 June 1944 | A Yūgumo-class destroyer that was torpedoed by USS Hake at the mouth of Davao Gulf. | 06°03′N 125°57′E |
| Kinu | Imperial Japanese Navy | 26 October 1944 | A Nagara-class light cruiser that was bombed by US aircraft southwest of Masbate. | 11°45′N 123°11′E |
| Kiyoshimo | Imperial Japanese Navy | 26 December 1944 | A Yūgumo-class destroyer that was sunk by US forces off San Jose. | 12°20′N 121°0′E |
| Kogyo Maru | Imperial Japanese Army | Unknown | An army auxiliary supply ship that was sunk in Coron Island. | |
| Kumano | Imperial Japanese Navy | 25 November 1944 | A Mogami-class cruiser that was sunk by US aircraft off Santa Cruz. | 15°44′58″N 119°47′57″E |
| Kyokuzan Maru | Imperial Japanese Army | Unknown | An army auxiliary supply ship that was sunk at Coron Island. | |
| USS Lanakai | United States Navy | 1947 | A schooner-rigged diesel yacht that was confiscated from its German owners and renamed USS Hermes. After World War I, it was sold to MGM, who renamed it MV Lanakai and used it in the film The Hurricane, starring Jon Hall and Dorothy Lamour. During World War II, the ship operated as a covert intelligence-gathering vessel around the Philippines and Vietnam. It was sunk by a typhoon in 1947. | 14°46′N 120°15′E |
| USS Mahan | United States Navy | 7 December 1944 | A Mahan-class destroyer that was sunk between Leyte and Ponson Island. | 10°50′N 124°30′E |
| USS Majaba | United States Navy | August 1946 | A lumber transport, known locally as El Capitan, that was commissioned for supply duties during World War II. A Liberty ship, the vessel received a Battle Star for her duties and survived being torpedoed by a Japanese submarine at Guadalcanal. She was sunk by typhoon in Subic Bay, whilst undergoing re-fit/repair after the war. | 14°46′N 120°15′E |
| Michishio | Imperial Japanese Navy | 22 October 1944 | An Asashio-class destroyer that was sunk in the Battle of Surigao Strait. | 10°25′N 125°23′E |
| Ming Dynasty | Unknown | Unknown | A Chinese merchant vessel that was sunk off the coast of Marinduque. | |
| Mogami | Imperial Japanese Navy | 25 October 1944 | A Mogami-class heavy cruiser that suffered heavy damage in the Battle of Surigao Strait and was scuttled. | 09°40′N 124°50′E |
| Musashi | Imperial Japanese Navy | 24 October 1944 | A Yamato-class battleship that was sunk in the Sibuyan Sea during the Battle of Leyte Gulf. | 13°07′N 122°32′E |
| Nachi | Imperial Japanese Navy | 5 November 1944 | A Myōkō-class heavy cruiser that was sunk by US aircraft in Manila Bay. | 14°31′N 120°44′E |
| Naganami | Imperial Japanese Navy | 11 November 1944 | A Yūgumo-class destroyer that was sunk by US aircraft in Ormoc Bay. | 10°50′N 124°35′E |
| USS New York | United States Navy | December 1941 | An armored cruiser that was scuttled in Subic Bay to avoid Japanese capture during World War II. | 14°48′N 120°16′E |
| Noshiro | Imperial Japanese Navy | 26 October 1944 | An Agano-class light cruiser that was sunk by US aircraft south of Mindoro. | 11°42′N 121°41′E |
| Okikawa Maru | Imperial Japanese Navy | Unknown | An auxiliary oiler that was sunk at Coron Island. | |
| Okinami | Imperial Japanese Navy | 13 November 1944 | A Yūgumo-class destroyer that was sunk by US aircraft west of Manila. | 14°35′N 120°50′E |
| Olympia Maru | Imperial Japanese Army | Unknown | An Imperial Japanese Army auxiliary supply ship, sunk at Coron Island. | |
| USS Ommaney Bay | United States Navy | 4 January 1945 | A Casablanca-class escort carrier scuttled in the Sulu Sea after being struck by kamikaze aircraft. | 11°25′N 121°19′E |
| Oryoku Maru | Imperial Japanese Navy | 15 December 1944 | A Japanese prisoner-of-war (POW) transport ship "hell ship" that was sunk by aircraft from USS Hornet in Subic Bay. Oryuko Maru was "unmarked" as a POW transport. 200 Allied POWs died during the sinking, with a further 100 murdered or dying of suffocation or dehydration prior to the attack. Of a total of 1,620 POWs initially loaded on Oryuko Maru, only 403 survived Japanese captivity during the war. | 14°48′N 120°16′E |
| USS PC-1129 | United States Navy | 31 January 1945 | A PC-461-class submarine chaser that was sunk by a Shin'yō suicide boat off Luzon. | 14.05°N 120.30°E |
| USS Pompey | United States Navy | December 1941 | A merchant ship that was sunk by Japanese bombing at Manila. | |
| Princess of the Orient | Philippines | 18 September 1998 | A motor vessel that capsized in Manila Bay. | |
| Princess of the Stars | Philippines | 21 June 2008 | A passenger ferry that sank in San Fernando, Romblon, resulting in over 500 deaths. | |
| USS Princeton | United States Navy | 24 October 1944 | An Independence-class aircraft carrier that was lost at the Battle of Leyte Gulf. | 15°21′N 123°31′E |
| Royal Captain | East India Company | 17 December 1773 | A schooner, chartered to the East India Company, that struck a reef 46 miles (74 km) from Palawan, en route to Balambangan Island. All but three crewmen survived the sinking and were picked up by the British ship Union. The three sailors who drowned were apparently drunk and refused to take to the lifeboats. | |
| Sakura Maru | Imperial Japanese Navy | 1944 | A merchant vessel in wartime auxiliary naval service, sunk by US forces in Subic Bay during World War II. The wreck is located in the Grande Island channel, at a depth of 54 metres (177 ft). | |
| USS Samuel B. Roberts | United States Navy | 25 October 1944 | A John C. Butler-class destroyer escort that sank during the Battle off Samar. | 11°40′N 126°20′E - |
| San Quentin | Spanish Navy | April 1898 | A Spanish gunboat that was scuttled between Grande Island and Chiquita Islands, near the mouth of Subic Bay, during the Spanish–American War, in the hope of blocking the passage to the US Navy. | 14°45′36″N 120°13′48″E |
| Sarushima | Imperial Japanese Navy | 4 July 1944 | A Natsushima-class minelayer that was sunk by US aircraft off Magsaysay. | 12°15′N 121°00′E |
| Satsuki | Imperial Japanese Navy | 21 September 1944 | A Mutsuki-class destroyer that was sunk by US aircraft in Manila Bay. | 14°35′N 120°45′E |
| Seian Maru | Imperial Japanese Navy | 19 December 1944 | A 3,712-ton freighter serving in wartime auxiliary naval service. It was initially requisitioned in September 1940, as an auxiliary anti-submarine net-layer and patrol boat, before being re-enrolled as an auxiliary transport in August 1942. She was converted to an emergency tanker in January 1943, and sunk by US naval aircraft in Subic Bay during World War II. | 14°48′N 120°16′E |
| Shimakaze | Imperial Japanese Navy | 11 November 1944 | A destroyer that was sunk by US aircraft at Ormoc Bay. | 10°50′N 124°35′E |
| Shiranui | Imperial Japanese Navy | 27 October 1944 | A Kagerō-class destroyer that was sunk by US aircraft 80 miles (130 km) north of Iloilo. | 12°0′N 122°30′E |
| USS Sonoma | United States Navy | 24 October 1944 | A Sonoma-class fleet tug that was sunk by Japanese aircraft off Dulag, Leyte. | 10°57′N 125°2′E |
| USS St. Lo | United States Navy | 25 October 1944 | A Casablanca-class escort carrier of the United States Navy during World War II, and the first major warship sunk by a kamikaze attack during the Battle of Leyte Gulf. | |
| Tanikaze | Imperial Japanese Navy | 9 June 1944 | A Kagerō-class destroyer that was torpedoed by USS Harder in Sibutu Passage. | 05°42′N 120°41′E |
| Teiyō Maru | Imperial Japanese Navy | 19 August 1944 | A replenishment oiler that was torpedoed by US submarines off Ilocos Norte. | 18°09′N 120°13′E |
| Uzuki | Imperial Japanese Navy | 12 December 1944 | A Mutsuki-class destroyer that was sunk by US torpedo boats 50 miles (80 km) northeast of Cebu. | 11°03′N 124°23′E |
| Wakaba | Imperial Japanese Navy | 24 October 1944 | A Hatsuharu-class destroyer that was sunk by US aircraft in the Battle of Leyte Gulf. | 11°50′N 121°25′E |
| Wakatsuki | Imperial Japanese Navy | 11 November 1944 | An Akizuki-class destroyer that was sunk by US aircraft in Ormoc Bay. | 10°50′N 124°35′E |
| Yaeyama | Imperial Japanese Navy | 24 September 1944 | A minelayer that was sunk by US aircraft off Palawan. | 12°15′N 121°00′E |
| Yamagumo | Imperial Japanese Navy | 25 October 1944 | An Asashio-class destroyer that was torpedoed by USS McDermut in the Battle of Surigao Strait. | 10°25′N 125°23′E |
| Yamashiro | Imperial Japanese Navy | 25 October 1944 | A Fusō-class battleship that was sunk in the Battle of Surigao Strait. | 10°22′14″N 125°21′20″E |
| Yūnagi | Imperial Japanese Navy | 25 August 1944 | A Kamikaze-class destroyer that was torpedoed by USS Picuda northeast of Cape Bojeador Lighthouse. | 18°46′N 120°46′E |
| Yūzuki | Imperial Japanese Navy | 23 December 1944 | A Mutsuki-class destroyer that was sunk by US aircraft 65 miles (105 km) northeast of Cebu. | 11°20′N 124°10′E |

== Russia ==
| Ship | Flag | Sunk date | Notes | Coordinates |
|---|---|---|---|---|
| K-27 | Soviet Navy | 6 September 1982 | A November-class submarine that was scuttled off the northeastern coast of Novaya Zemlya. | 72°31′N 55°30′E |
| Niitaka | Imperial Japanese Navy | 26 August 1922 | A Niitaka-class protected cruiser that capsized in a typhoon off the Ust-Bolsheretsky District. | 51°30′N 156°29′E |
| Sibiryakov | Soviet Navy | 24 August 1942 | An icebreaker that was sunk by the German cruiser Admiral Scheer northwest of Russky Island. | 76°00′N 91°31′E |
| U-362 | Kriegsmarine | 5 September 1944 | A Type VIIC U-boat that was sunk by T-116 east of the Mona Islands. | 75°51′N 89°27′E |
| U-639 | Kriegsmarine | 28 August 1943 | A Type VIIC U-boat that was sunk by S-101 off Cape Flissingsky. | 76°49′N 69°42′E |
| USS Wahoo | United States Navy | 11 October 1943 | A Gato-class submarine that was sunk by Japanese aircraft in La Perouse (Soya) Strait, between Hokkaidō and Sakhalin, during World War II. | |

== Singapore ==
| Ship | Flag | Sunk date | Notes | Coordinates |
|---|---|---|---|---|
| La Seyne | France | 14 November 1909 | A French liner belonging to the Messageries Maritimes fleet that collided with Onda (British India Steam Navigation Company) due to thick fog, and sank 30 nautical miles (56 km; 35 mi) off Singapore. 101 died, while many of the 61 who survived suffered grave wounds when attacked by sharks, prior to being saved by the crew of Onda. Refusing to be saved, the Captain of the French liner went down with his ship. | Singapore Strait |

== South Korea ==
| Ship | Flag | Sunk date | Notes | Coordinates |
|---|---|---|---|---|
| Chang Tyong-ho | South Korea | January 1953 | A Yosu-Busan route ferry that capsized off Busan. At least 249 people were confirmed dead; only seven survived. | |
| Hanseong-ho | South Korea | January 1973 | A Mokpo-Jin Island route ferry that capsized off Jeollanam-do. According to South Korean Coast Guard official confirmed report, at least 103 people were confirmed dead, only 48 persons survived. | |
| USS Magpie | United States Navy | 1 October 1950 | A YMS-1-class minesweeper that hit a mine off North Gyeongsang Province. | 36°30′N 129°30′E |
| Namyong ho | South Korea | December 1970 | A ferry that ran between Busan and Jeju-do, and capsized in Korea Strait, killing 323 people. Only 12 were rescued. | |
| Seohae | South Korea | October 1993 | A Puan County to Ui Island route ferry, capsized off Jeollabuk-do. According to South Korean Coast Guard official confirmed report, 292 person lost to lives, only 70 person rescued. | |
| Sewol | South Korea | 16 April 2014 | A ferry with 476 souls on board – most of which were high school students – that capsized near Donggeochado after making a "sudden turn" that overbalanced the ship, which could not be righted. Only 172 survived. The captain and crew were later charged with criminal negligence, gross negligence and manslaughter after it was revealed the ship was heavily overbalanced, and that the captain and crew abandoned ship after ordering the passengers to remain seated even as water began filling the ship, resulting in unnecessary deaths. | 34°13′5″N 125°57′0″E |
| Sperwer | VOC | August 1653 | A Dutch trading ship with the VOC (Dutch East India Company). It was blown off course and capsized in stormy weather off Jeju-do, killing 48 people, with 16 survivors. | |
| Yeong-ho | South Korea | October 1963 | A Yeonhwa Island to Mokpo route ferry, capsized off Jeollanam-do. According to South Korean Coast Guard official confirmed report, 140 person lost to lives, only a person rescued. | |

== Sri Lanka ==
| Ship | Flag | Sunk date | Notes | Coordinates |
|---|---|---|---|---|
| Ava | United Kingdom | 16 February 1858 | A steamship that ran aground near Trincomalee. | |
| British Sergeant | United Kingdom | 9 April 1942 | A tanker that was sunk off Batticaloa by Japanese aircraft. | |
| Great Basses wreck | Mughal Empire | Unknown | An 18th century shipwreck on the Great Basses Reef, discovered by Arthur C. Clarke in 1961. | 06°10′50″N 81°28′50″E |
| HMS Hollyhock | Royal Navy | 9 April 1942 | A corvette that was sunk by Japanese air attack. | 07°21′N 81°57′E |
| Farah III | Jordan | December 2006 | A cargo ship that was forcibly boarded by LTTE Sea Tigers and run aground near Mullaitivu. The Sri Lanka Army re-captured the wreck in 2009. | 09°18′52″N 80°47′29″E |
| HMS Tenedos | Royal Navy | 5 April 1942 | An S-class destroyer that was sunk at Colombo during the Indian Ocean raid. | 6°57′17″N 79°51′20″E |
| HMAS Vampire | Royal Australian Navy | 9 April 1942 | A V-class destroyer that was sunk by Japanese air attack. | 7°35′N 82°5′E |
| HMS Hermes | Royal Navy | 9 April 1942 | An aircraft carrier that was sunk by Japanese air attack. | |
| HMCyS Vijaya | Royal Ceylon Navy | 1975 | An Algerine-class minesweeper of the Royal Ceylon Navy that sank in a strong storm in the Gulf of Mannar. | |

== Taiwan ==
| Ship | Flag | Sunk date | Notes | Coordinates |
|---|---|---|---|---|
| Hatakaze | Imperial Japanese Navy | 15 January 1945 | A Kamikaze-class destroyer that was sunk by US aircraft at Kaohsiung. | 22°40′N 120°14′E |
| Minekaze | Imperial Japanese Navy | 10 February 1944 | A Minekaze-class destroyer that was torpedoed by USS Pogy off Taitung County. | 22°12′N 121°30′E |

== Thailand ==
| Ship | Flag | Sunk date | Notes | Coordinates |
|---|---|---|---|---|
| King Cruiser | Thailand | 4 May 1997 | A car ferry that hit a reef off the Phi Phi Islands. | |
| Ocean Dream | Panama | 27 February 2016 | A cruise ship that had been abandoned for a year without any maintenance, sank and capsized in shallow waters near the port of Laem Chabang, Sri Racha. | |
| HTMS Sukhothai | Royal Thai Navy | 18 December 2022 | A Ratanakosin-class corvette that sank in a storm off Bang Saphan Noi, Prachuap Khiri Khan. | 11°00′N 99°53′E |

== Turkey ==
| Ship | Flag | Sunk date | Notes | Coordinates |
|---|---|---|---|---|
| Alexandra | French Navy | 8 February 1918 | A French ship that was sunk by Turkish coastal artillery about 1-mile (1.6 km) outside Avova Bay (Ağva Körfezi). | |
| Âsâr-ı Tevfik | Ottoman Navy | 11 February 1913 | An ironclad warship that ran aground off Yalıköy, Istanbul. | |
| HMS Arno | Royal Navy | 23 March 1918 | A destroyer that collided with HMS Hope in the Dardanelles. | 40°14′30″N 26°30′30″E |
| Bouvet | French Navy | 18 March 1915 | A pre-dreadnought battleship, launched in 1896 and sunk by Turkish coastal artillery in the Dardanelles Campaign. | 40°01′15″N 26°16′30″E |
| SMS Breslau | Imperial German Navy | 16 August 1914 | A Magdeburg-class light cruiser that was sunk in the Battle of Imbros. | 40°3′42″N 25°58′42″E |
| The Cape Gelidonya shipwreck | Unknown | 1200 BCE | A Phoenician merchant vessel that was wrecked around 1200 BCE. | 36°38′10″N 30°33′26″E |
| Duchess of York | United Kingdom | After 1807 | An iron-screw steamer ketch built in Hull in 1893. It was sold and renamed Carmen in 1902, and sold again in 1919. Its subsequent fate was unknown until the wreckage was discovered in the 1950s. | 36°12.716′N 29°24.732′E |
| HMS Majestic | Royal Navy | 27 May 1915 | A Majestic-class battleship that was torpedoed by SM U-21 off Cape Helles. | 40°02′30″N 26°11′02″E |
| Mariotte | French Navy | 26 July 1915 | A French submarine that was scuttled off Cape Nara, near Çanakkale. | |
| Paris II | French Navy | 13 December 1917 | A French naval patrol ship sunk by Turkish coastal artillery off Kemer inside Avova Bay (Ağva Körfezi). Approximately 150 shots were fired, of which 110 hit the target. The crew were rescued by Turkish soldiers. | 36°36′8.06″N 30°35′10.93″E |
| HMS Raglan | Royal Navy | 20 January 1918 | An Abercrombie-class monitor that was sunk by Turkish ships off Imbros. | 40°14′N 25°58′E |
| Refah | Turkey | 23 June 1941 | A Turkish ship that was sunk by an unidentified (probably French) submarine. Of the 200 aboard, only 32 survived. | |
| Sakarya | Unknown | 1957 | A cargo ship which struck a reef while suffering engine trouble. The wreckage was discovered in 1994, close to the wreck of Duchess of York. | 36°12.716′N 29°24.732′E |
| U-20 | Kriegsmarine | 10 September 1944 | A Type IIB U-boat that was scuttled in the Black Sea. | 41°10′N 30°47′E |
| Uluburun shipwreck | Unknown | Unknown | A merchant ship dating to the late Bronze Age. | 36°7′43″N 29°41′9″E |

== Vietnam ==
| Ship | Flag | Sunk date | Notes | Coordinates |
|---|---|---|---|---|
| Kashii | Imperial Japanese Navy | 12 January 1945 | A Katori-class light cruiser that was sunk by US aircraft off Qui Nhon. | 13°50′N 109°20′E |
| Nokaze | Imperial Japanese Navy | 20 February 1945 | A Minekaze-class destroyer that was torpedoed by USS Pargo north of Nha Trang. | 12°48′N 109°38′E |
