= Yueyang–Linwu Expressway =

Road in Hunan, China

Yueyang–Linwu Expressway
- 许昌－广州高速公路
- Yuelin Expressway; Chinese: 岳临高速公路

Route information
- Length: 539 km (335 mi)
- Existed: 2011–present

Location
- Country: China

Highway system
- National Trunk Highway System; Primary; Auxiliary; National Highways; Transport in China

The Yueyang–Linwu Expressway commonly abbreviated as Yuelin Expressway (simplified Chinese: 岳临高速公路; traditional Chinese: 岳臨高速公路), is an expressway in Hunan province, China that connects Yueyang and Linwu County. It is 539 kilometres (335 mi) in length. It is the section of G0421 Xuchang–Guangzhou Expressway in Hunan. Its northern terminus is at Jingyue Yangtze River Bridge and its southern terminus is at Huangsha Town of Yizhang County.

== Route ==
The expressway passes the following major cities and countries:

- Yueyang County
- Miluo
- Xiangyin
- Xiangtan
- Wangcheng District
- Yuelu District
- Hengshan County
- Hengyang County
- Zhengxiang District
- Changning
- Guiyang County
- Jiahe County
- Linwu County
- Yizhang County
- Xintian County

== Scenic spots ==
- Yueyang Tower
- Mount Heng (Hunan)
- Yuelu Mountain
