= Oriental Star =

Oriental Star may refer to:

- MV Oriental Star, or Dong Fang Zhi Xing, Chinese ship
- Oriental Star Agencies, British based record label
