= Wangshi, Hubei =

Wangshi 网市镇
- Town
- Location in Hubei
- Coordinates: 30°06′37″N 113°06′53″E
- Country: People's Republic of China
- Province: Hubei
- Prefecture-level city: Jingzhou
- County: Jianli
- Village-level divisions: 2 residential communities 23 villages

Area
  - Total: 114 km^{2} (44 sq mi)
- Elevation: 27 m (89 ft)

Population (2010)
  - Total: 39,050
  - Density: 343/km^{2} (887/sq mi)
- Time zone: UTC+8 (China Standard)
- Area code: 0716

Wangshi (simplified Chinese: 网市; traditional Chinese: 網市; pinyin: Wǎngshì) is a town of Jianli County, Jingzhou, in southern Hubei province, China.

== Administrative divisions ==
As of 2017, Wangshi had 2 residential communities (居委会) and 23 villages (村) under its administration.

Two residential communities:

- Wangshi (网市居委会), Beikou (北口居委会)

Twenty-three villages:

- Xiaotan (小潭村), Gaoqiao (高桥村), Batou (扒头村), Sanguan (三官村), Gaomiao (高庙村), Gumiao (顾庙村), Hengdi (横堤村), Jianxin (建新村), Beikou (北口村), Tiemiao (铁庙村), Yushi (予市村), Nianqiao (碾桥村), Wangshi (网市村), Xinlu (新芦村), Zhoutai (周台村), Miaolu (庙芦村), Sansheng (三圣村), Tiezui (铁嘴村), Minglu (明芦村), Datan (大潭村), Liulian (刘连村), Liuwang (刘王村), Xinshan/sha (新杉村)

== See also ==
- List of township-level divisions of Hubei
