= Japanese cruiser Otowa =

Protected cruiser of the Imperial Japanese Navy

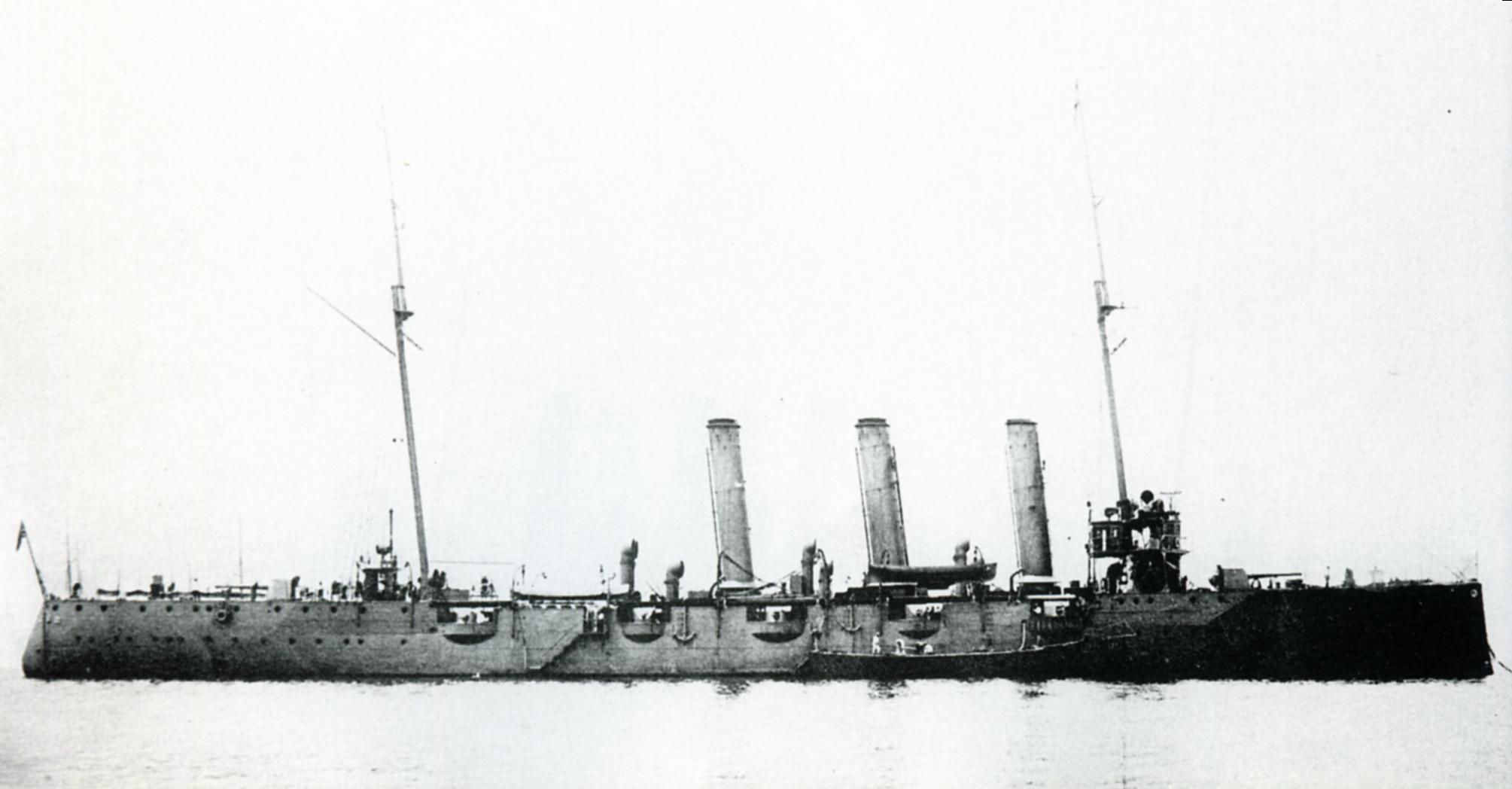
- Otowa in 1905

History

Empire of Japan
- Name: Otowa
- Ordered: 1897 Fiscal Year
- Builder: Yokosuka Naval Arsenal, Japan
- Laid down: 3 January 1903
- Launched: 2 November 1903
- Completed: 6 September 1904
- Stricken: 1 December 1917
- Fate: Ran aground 1 August 1917; Sank 10 August 1917

General characteristics
- Type: Protected cruiser
- Displacement: 3,000 long tons (3,048 t)
- Length: 98 m (321 ft 6 in) w/l
- Beam: 12.62 m (41 ft 5 in)
- Draft: 4.8 m (15 ft 9 in)
- Propulsion: 2-shaft VTE reciprocating engines; 10 boilers; 10,000 hp (7,500 kW); 575 tons coal
- Speed: 21 knots (24 mph; 39 km/h)
- Complement: 280-312
- Armament: 2 × QF 6 inch /40 naval guns; 6 × QF 4.7 inch Gun Mk I–IV guns; 4 × QF 12 pounder 12 cwt naval guns
- Armor: Deck: 75 mm (3 in) (slope); 50 mm (2 in) (flat); Gun shield: 37 mm (1 in); Conning tower: 100 mm (4 in)

Otowa (音羽) was a protected cruiser of the Imperial Japanese Navy, designed and built by the Yokosuka Naval Arsenal in Japan. The name Otowa comes from a mountain in Kyoto, located behind Kiyomizu-dera. The waters from a waterfall at this temple were traditionally held to be a cure for all illnesses.

== Background ==
Authorized under the 2nd Naval Expansion Program of 1897, Otowa was originally intended to be the third vessel in the Niitaka-class cruiser series. However, due to budget constraints, Otowa was redesigned with 10 percent smaller displacement, and with considerably lighter weaponry. The ship was completed in less than 20 months; its rapid construction time set a new record for Japan. She was laid down on 3 January 1903, launched on 2 November 1903 and completed on 6 September 1904.

Otowa was the first ship to be equipped with the Japanese-designed Kampon water-tube boiler which developed 227 psi (1.57 MPa) compared to the 213 psi (1.47 MPa) pressure of the previous Niclausse boilers in the Niitaka class. The vertical triple expansion steam engines were identical to those of the Niitaka class with a slight increase in power. It was intended that the reduction in armor and armament in Otowa be partially offset by higher speed, but in fact Otowa was only very slightly faster than the Niitaka-class cruisers. Otowa was also the last vessel to be constructed for the Imperial Japanese Navy with a naval ram.

== Service record ==
=== Russo-Japanese War ===
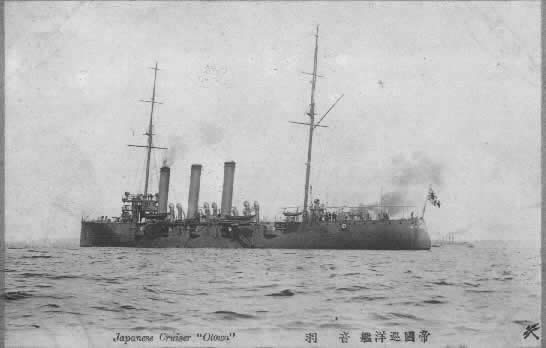
In 1905

Otowa was rushed into service in order to participate in the Russo-Japanese War, joining the Japanese fleet blockading Port Arthur on 16 September 1904 under the command of Commander Arima Ryōkitsu. On 13 December, she assisted in the rescue of survivors from Takasago, which had been sunk by a naval mine. In early 1905, she was assigned to escort troop transports ferrying reinforcements from Japan to northern Korea.

During the crucial Battle of Tsushima on 27 May 1905, Otowa was assigned to the 3rd squadron of the IJN 2nd Fleet, and saw combat against the Imperial Russian Navy cruisers Oleg, Aurora and Zhemchug. During the first day of battle, she did not take any damage. On 28 May 1905, Otowa and Niitaka intercepted the cruiser Svetlana which had been heavily damaged the day before and was attempting to escape towards Korea together with a destroyer. Otowa was hit by Svetlana's stern guns, killing one officer and four sailors, and injuring 23 others before the Russian cruiser sank. Later that day, at 1600 hours Otowa participated in the final combat of the battle by engaging the cruiser Dmitrii Donskoi, during which time she was hit again, injuring two sailors.

After the Battle of Tsushima, Otowa was assigned to patrols of Tsushima Strait and escorting transports to Korea until the end of the war. On 10 October, she captured the German merchantman Hans Wagner en route to Beijing with suspected war materials.

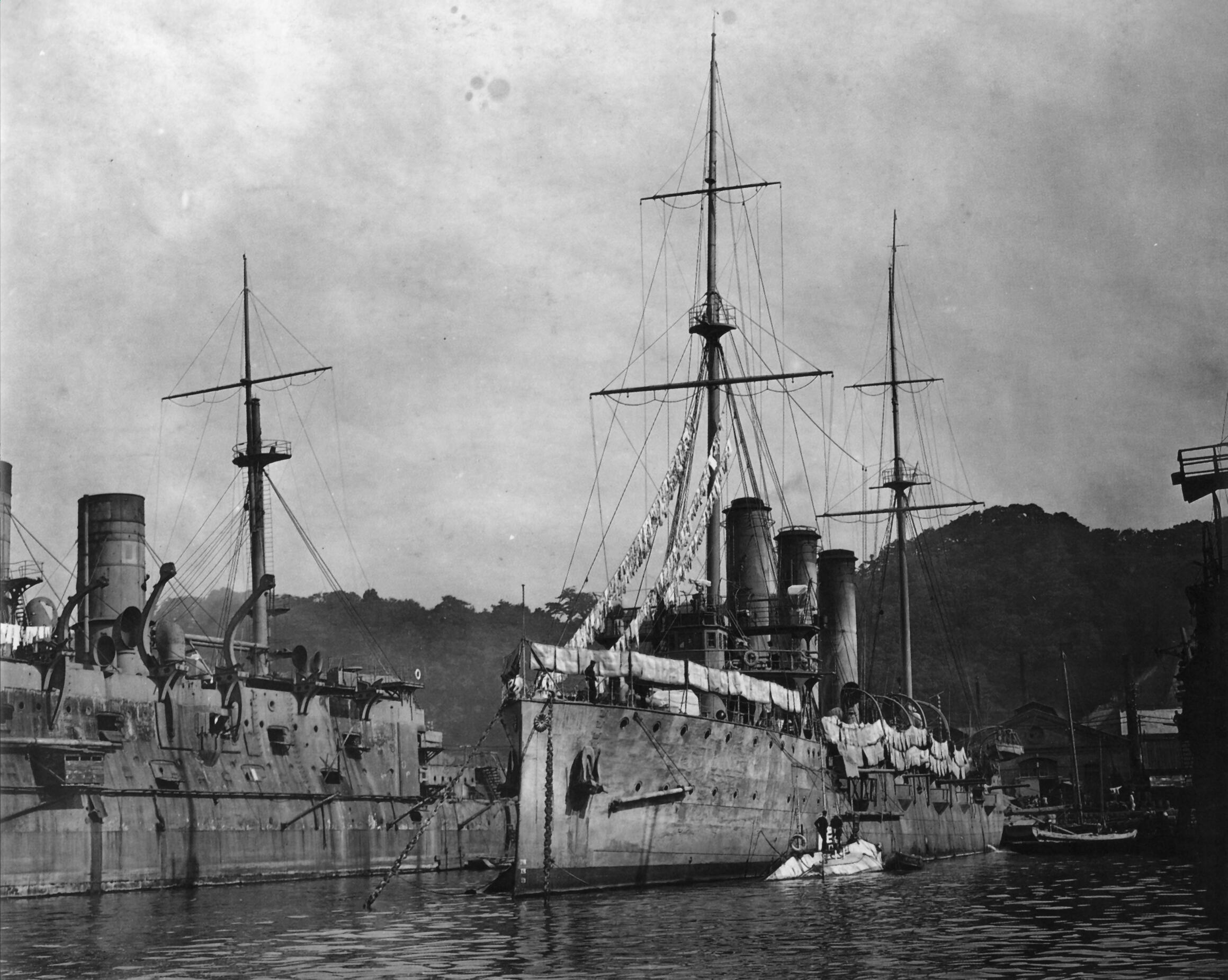
Otowa and the battleship Suwo at Yokosuka, 1906

=== World War I ===
In 1908, Otowa participated in the first post-war fleet maneuvers of the Imperial Japanese Navy, as part of the 4th brigade of Cruiser Squadron 1. From October 1910 through June 1912, Otowa was stationed in northern China together with the cruisers Tokiwa and Iwate to protect Japanese citizens and economic interests during the Xinhai Revolution.

On 28 August 1912 Otowa was re-designated as a 2nd class cruiser

During World War I, Otowa was the flagship of Destroyer Squadron 1 of the Combined Fleet. She fought at the Battle of Tsingtao, and was subsequently assigned to patrol the sea lanes between Singapore, Polynesia and the Philippines from its forward base at Manila Bay against the Imperial German Navy, as part of the Japanese contribution to the Allied cause under the Anglo-Japanese Alliance.

During the February 1915 Singapore Mutiny by Indian Sepoy troops against the British in Singapore, Otowa was the first ship to respond to the British government's request for assistance. Together with Niitaka and Tsushima, she landed marines to help quell the disturbances.

On 25 July 1917, when en route from Yokosuka to Sasebo Naval District, Otowa ran aground in dense fog off Daiozaki, Shima peninsula, Mie prefecture (34°14′N 136°53′E). Subsequent efforts to save the vessel failed, and Otowa broke apart and sank on 10 August 1917.
