= Wanjiao One =

Lanjiao One (Chinese: 碗礁一号; pinyin: Lanjiao yihao) is an ancient Chinese merchant ship that sank off the coast of Pingtan County of Fujian Province, China. Loaded with more than 10,000 pieces of blue-and-white porcelain dating back to the reign of the Kangxi Emperor (1654-1722) in the Qing dynasty (1644-1911), it was discovered in 2005 and the shipwreck was fully excavated in 2008.

== See also ==
- Nanhai One
- Nan'ao One
