= Japanese cruiser Niitaka =

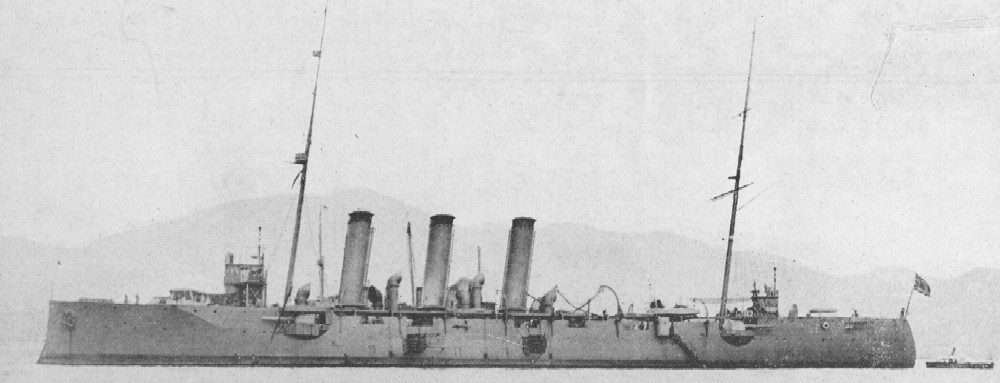
- Niitaka in 1922

History

Empire of Japan
- Name: Niitaka
- Namesake: Mount Niitaka
- Ordered: 1897 Fiscal Year
- Builder: Yokosuka Naval Arsenal, Japan
- Laid down: 7 January 1902
- Launched: 15 November 1902
- Completed: 27 January 1904
- Stricken: 1 April 1924
- Fate: Wrecked 26 August 1922

General characteristics
- Class & type: Niitaka-class cruiser
- Displacement: 3,366 long tons (3,420 t)
- Length: 102 m (334 ft 8 in) w/l
- Beam: 13.44 m (44 ft 1 in)
- Draft: 4.92 m (16 ft 2 in)
- Installed power: 9,500 ihp (7,100 kW)
- Propulsion: 2 × vertical triple expansion reciprocating engines; 16 × Niclausse boilers; 2 × screws; 600 tons coal
- Speed: 20 kn (23 mph; 37 km/h)
- Complement: 287-320
- Armament: 6 × 15.2 cm (6 in)/40 naval guns; 10 × QF 12-pounder 12 cwt naval guns; 4 × QF 3-pounder Hotchkiss guns
- Armor: Deck: 76 mm (3 in); Conning tower: 100 mm (4 in)

Niitaka (新高) was the lead ship of the Niitaka-class protected cruisers of the Imperial Japanese Navy. She was the sister ship of the Tsushima. Niitaka was named after Mount Niitaka in Taiwan, at the time, the tallest mountain in the Japanese Empire.

== Background ==
The Niitaka-class cruisers were ordered by the Imperial Japanese Navy under its 2nd Emergency Expansion Program, with a budget partly funded by the war indemnity received from the Empire of China as part of the settlement of the Treaty of Shimonoseki ending the First Sino-Japanese War. The class was intended for high speed reconnaissance missions. Niitaka was built at the Yokosuka Naval Arsenal, with the keel laid down on 7 January 1902 and launched on 15 November 1902.

== Design ==
In terms of design, Niitaka was very conservative in layout and similar to, but somewhat larger than the earlier Japanese-designed Suma. The increased displacement, heavier armor and lower center of gravity resulted in a more seaworthy and powerful vessel than Suma, and enabled Niitaka to outclass many other contemporary protected cruisers.

In terms of armament, it is noteworthy that Niitaka was not equipped with torpedoes. Observing problems experienced by the United States Navy during the Spanish–American War with torpedo reliability and the dangers of sympathetic detonation, it was decided not to use this weapon on the new cruisers. The main battery used the standard 15.2 cm (6 in)/40 naval gun found on most contemporary Japanese cruisers.

The Niitaka-class cruisers were fitted with 16 Niclausse boilers, a great improvement on the locomotive boilers of the Suma class.

== Service life ==
=== Russo-Japanese War ===
Niitaka was commissioned just in time for the Russo-Japanese War and saw combat at the Battle of Chemulpo Bay on 2 February 1904 against the Russian cruiser Varyag. She subsequently participated in the shore bombardment of Russian positions during the Battle of Port Arthur on 9 March 1904. From April, Niitaka was assigned to patrols of the Korea Strait and the Sea of Japan, but was not in position to participate in Battle off Ulsan on 14 August 1904. She did, however, assist in the rescue of Russian sailors off the sinking cruiser Rurik after the battle. At the Battle of the Yellow Sea, Niitaka was part of the 4th Detachment of Japanese 2nd Fleet against the Russian cruiser Askold.She was subsequently one of the ships stationed at Makung in the Pescadores Islands to watch for the arrival of the Russian Baltic Fleet.

At the crucial final Battle of Tsushima on 27 May 1905, Niitaka was part of the Japanese squadron attacking the Russian cruisers Oleg, Aurora and Zhemchug as well as the already heavily damaged battleship Knyaz Suvorov. Niitaka took one hit during the engagement, which killed one crewman and wounded three others. On 28 May 1905, Niitaka and Otowa intercepted and sank the cruiser Svetlana which had been heavily damaged the day before and which was attempting to escape towards Korea together with a destroyer.

On 28 May 1905, Niitaka took part in the final combat of the battle against cruiser Dmitrii Donskoi. For the remainder of the war, Niitaka ferried troop convoys in the Sea of Japan, and was overhauled at the Sasebo Naval Arsenal in September 1905.

After the war, Niitaka was assigned to patrol duties off the China coast, and was occasionally stationed at Manila to protect Japanese citizens and economic interests in the Philippines.

In October, Niitaka was assigned to detached duty, to provide escort for the passenger liner Awa Maru, which carried on board Prince Karl Anton of Hohenzollern.

=== World War I ===
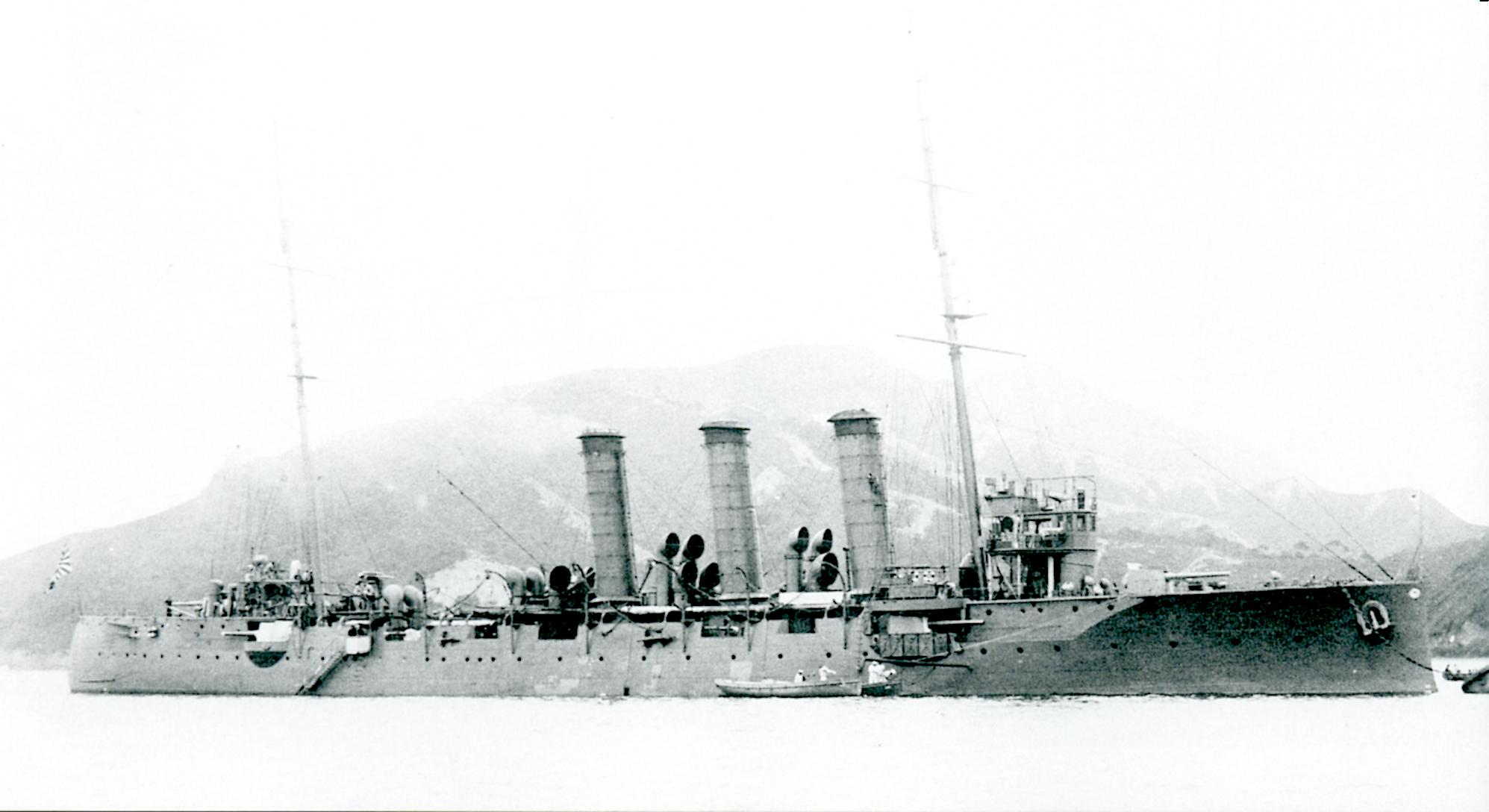
At Sasebo in 1918

In World War I, Niitaka participated in the Battle of Tsingtao, and was later assigned to the Japanese 3rd Fleet based at Singapore, to protect British shipping around Australia and New Zealand from German commerce raiders, as part of Japan's contribution to the Allied war effort under the Anglo-Japanese Alliance. While at Singapore, 158 marines from the cruisers Otowa and Niitaka helped suppress the February 1915 Singapore Mutiny by Indian Sepoy troops against the British.

From mid-1915 to 1918, Tsushima and Niitaka were permanently based at Cape Town, assisting the Royal Navy in patrolling the sea lanes in the Indian Ocean, linking Europe to the east against German commerce raiders and U-boats.

=== Post-war career ===
From September to July 1920, Niitaka assisted in the landings of Japanese forces in Petropavlovsk under the Siberian Intervention to help the White Russian forces against the Bolsheviks in the Russian Civil War, and to protect Japanese fishermen along the Kamchatka Peninsula.

Niitaka was assigned to patrols of the coasts of southern China and the northern edges of the Netherlands East Indies in the South China Sea from May–September 1921, and on 1 September 1921, was re-designated a 2nd class coastal defense vessel.

==== Fate ====
On 26 August 1922, Niitaka anchored near the mouth of a river in what is now part of the Ust-Bolsheretsky District on the southern coast of the Kamchatka Peninsula, while a party of 15 led by Lieutenant Shigetada Gunji went ashore. Sudden typhoon-force winds drove the vessel onto rocks, where it overturned, killing all 284 people aboard at 51°30′N 156°29′E. The only survivors were the members of the shore party. A Russian source states that the captain survived the accident, only to commit seppuku afterwards.

A salvage team sent in 1923 determined the wreck to be unsalvageable, and destroyed the remains with explosives. A concrete obelisk was also erected with a portion of the ship's mast on a hill slightly north of the wreck site. Niitaka was formally written off the navy list on 1 April 1924.
