= HMS Arno =

Destroyer of the Royal Navy

Coordinates: 40°14′30″N 26°30′30″E

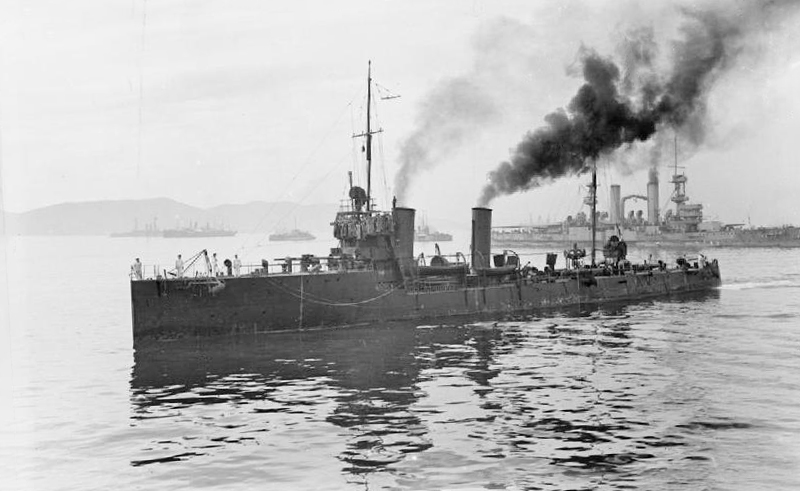
- HMS Arno in 1915

History

United Kingdom
- Name: HMS Arno
- Builder: Ansaldo, Genoa
- Laid down: 1914
- Launched: 22 December 1914
- Completed: 1915
- Identification: Pennant number : 6A
- Fate: Sunk in collision, 23 March 1918

General characteristics
- Type: Destroyer
- Displacement: 520 long tons (528 t)
- Length: 321 ft (98 m)
- Beam: 23 ft 6 in (7.16 m)
- Draft: 7 ft (2.1 m)
- Installed power: 8,000 shp (6,000 kW)
- Propulsion: 2 × steam turbines; 2 × shafts
- Speed: 28.5 kn (52.8 km/h; 32.8 mph)
- Capacity: 130 long tons (132 t) fuel oil
- Armament: 4 × single 12-pounder guns, 3 × single 18-inch (450 mm) torpedo tubes

HMS Arno was a unique destroyer of the Royal Navy that saw service and was lost during First World War. She was under construction in Genoa, Italy for the friendly Portuguese Navy as Liz in 1914 when she was bought by the Royal Navy for service in the Mediterranean.

She had two funnels and masts and four QF 12-pounder guns, shipped sided on the forecastle, behind the second funnel and on the quarterdeck. Although much smaller and slower than her British contemporaries, she was soundly built and had a high freeboard and tall bridge, making her a useful vessel. She was lost off the Dardanelles after a collision with the Acorn-/H-class destroyer Hope on 23 March 1918.

== Bibliography ==
- Destroyers of the Royal Navy, 1893-1981, Maurice Cocker, 1983, Ian Allan, ISBN 0-7110-1075-7
- Jantzen, Ulrigh; Matis, Richardo Graca (1998). "Origins of Portuguese Destroyer Liz". Warship International. XXXV (1): 105–106.
