= Sinking of Dongfang zhi Xing =

2015 Chinese river cruise ship capsize

Sinking of MV Dongfang zhi Xing
- Sinking location (Hubei) Sinking location (China)
- Date: 1 June 2015
- Time: 21:28 (UTC+8)
- Location: Yangtze River, Jianli County, Hubei; 29.7123°N 112.9236°E
- Participants: 454
- Outcome: Ship sank, 12 rescued
- Deaths: 442
- Survivors: 12

MV Dongfang zhi Xing (Chinese: 东方之星; pinyin: Dōngfāng zhī Xīng; translated as Oriental Star or Eastern Star) was a river cruise ship that operated in the Three Gorges region of inland China. On the night of 1 June 2015, the ship was traveling on the Yangtze River when it capsized during a thunderstorm in Jianli, Hubei Province, with 454 people on board. On 13 June, 442 deaths were confirmed, with 12 survivors (including two rescued by officials). The passengers were mostly in their 60s and 70s, and mostly from Nanjing, where the ship started its cruise.

The final investigation concluded the ship navigated into a squall line (the biggest scale of thunderstorm) from 21:19 onwards, was blasted by a downburst (a form of windshear) from 21:26 to 21:32, capsized at 21:31, and sank at 21:32. The ship met gusts of 32–38 m/s (72-85 mph, equivalent to wind force scale of 12–13). The hourly rain was observed at 94.4mm.

The sinking is the deadliest peacetime maritime disaster in China's history, and the worst maritime disaster (including wartime disasters) in China's history since the steamer Taiping sank in January 1949, killing more than 1,500.

== Sinking ==
Around 21:28 on 1 June 2015, Dongfang zhi Xing was making a 1,500 km (930 mi) trip from Nanjing to Chongqing on the Yangtze River. When the ship was near Jingzhou, it was caught in a storm and sank in approximately 15 m (49 ft) deep waters. The captain and the chief engineer said that the ship was hit by a tornado, and the China Meteorological Administration confirmed that a tornado occurred in Jianli County with wind-speeds reaching EF1 strength, or approximately 138–177 km/h (86–110 mph). It was once widely believed that the tornado struck the river near the ship's location, but later investigation suggested that the tornado struck a location 8 km away and did not affect the ship; instead, based on Doppler radar data and other evidence, the official report found that a massive downburst in the thunderstorm, with gusts over 118 km/h (73 mph) (12–13 on the Beaufort scale), was the likely cause of the capsizing.

== Passengers and crew ==
Passengers on board by region
Region	No.
Jiangsu	204
Shanghai	97
Tianjin	43
Shandong	23
Fujian	19
Zhejiang	11
Anhui	8
Total	405

Initially, the Chinese authorities reported 458 people were aboard the ship, but later reduced this figure to 456. This included 405 passengers, all of whom were Chinese and mostly elderly, 46 crew members, and five tour guides. According to crew members that were rescued, the storm hit and capsized the ship quickly while most of the passengers were asleep. One rescued passenger stated that the ship had become flooded with water, and with the turbulent river conditions, capsized after experiencing a list greater than 45 degrees. Seven survivors were able to swim to shore and alert authorities about two and a half hours after capsizing. On 13 June, the Chinese authorities updated that 454, not 456, people were on board and 442 bodies had been found with 12 rescued.

=== Analysis of the incident ===
Severe weather reports were issued for the area, which should have subsequently been sent to all vessels on the river in the area for them to take necessary precautions. There is no confirmation that Dongfang zhi Xing had been properly notified, though at least one other vessel travelling nearby was shown to have taken precautions due to the weather warning. The ship's captain and chief engineer, two of the rescued persons, were taken into custody for questioning.

The Chinese government censored news and discussion about this accident, while tightly controlling media coverage. The Politburo Standing Committee attempted to control public opinion about the disaster response, by issuing an order to both "understand the sorrow of the families" and "concretely preserve social stability".

On 30 December 2015, the Chinese government issued the investigation report on the incident. The report said that heavy storms caused Dongfang zhi Xing to capsize; it also found that the shipping company and local authorities had flaws in their daily management and suggested that 43 people be punished accordingly.

== Ship ==
History
- Name: Dongfang zhi Xing; 东方之星
- Owner: Chongqing Eastern Shipping Corporation (重庆东方轮船公司)
- Operator: Chongqing Eastern Shipping Corporation (重庆东方轮船公司)
- Port of registry: China
- Route: Nanjing to Chongqing
- Ordered: Before 1992
- Builder: Chongqing Chuandong Shipyard (重庆川东造船厂)
- Completed: 1994
- Maiden voyage: Fuling to Wanzhou
- In service: February 1994
- Out of service: 1 June 2015
- Identification: MMSI number: 413800469
- Fate: Capsized and sank on 1 June 2015

General characteristics
- Class & type: Cruise ship
- Tonnage: 3,900
- Displacement: 2,200
- Length: 76.5 m (251 ft 0 in)
- Beam: 11 m (36 ft 1 in)
- Height: 18.6 m (61 ft 0 in)
- Draught: 2.5 m (8 ft 2 in)
- Speed: 6 knots (11 km/h)
- Capacity: 534 passengers
- Crew: 46

MV Dongfang zhi Xing was constructed in February 1994. In 1997 the ship's length was extended by 11 metres (36 ft 1 in). It underwent another retrofit in 2008 that cut its capacity from 584 to 534 people. As of 2015, the ship was 76 metres (249 ft 4 in) long with a beam of 14 metres (45 ft 11 in). It was owned by the Chongqing Eastern Shipping Corporation and operated by Xiehe Travel. It made cruises in the Three Gorges area of inland China.

Dongfang zhi Xing, as well as other Yangtze River cruise ships, had come under increasing government scrutiny in recent years due to the growing tourist industry in China. In 2013, Dongfang zhi Xing and five other ships were cited for safety violations by the Nanjing maritime bureau, though the Chongqing Eastern Shipping Corporation did not comment on the nature of these infractions.

== Rescue ==
Rescue efforts were made immediately to save the passengers and crew, reaching full scale about twelve hours after the capsizing. Eighty-two people had been confirmed dead by 4 June, with some bodies having washed ashore 50 km (31 mi) downstream from the wreck. Fourteen people were rescued in the immediate aftermath, including the ship's engineer and captain.

According to a tweet from China Central Television (CCTV), rescuers were able to hear the sound of people trapped inside the vessel. CCTV reported that search teams heard people yelling from within the ship. One thousand police officers from the Hubei Armed Police Corps were sent to the site with 40 inflatable boats. Authorities reported that the search and rescue effort included 3,000 people and 50 boats. Crews used both underwater approaches with diving apparatus, and above-water approaches through holes cut through the inverted hull.

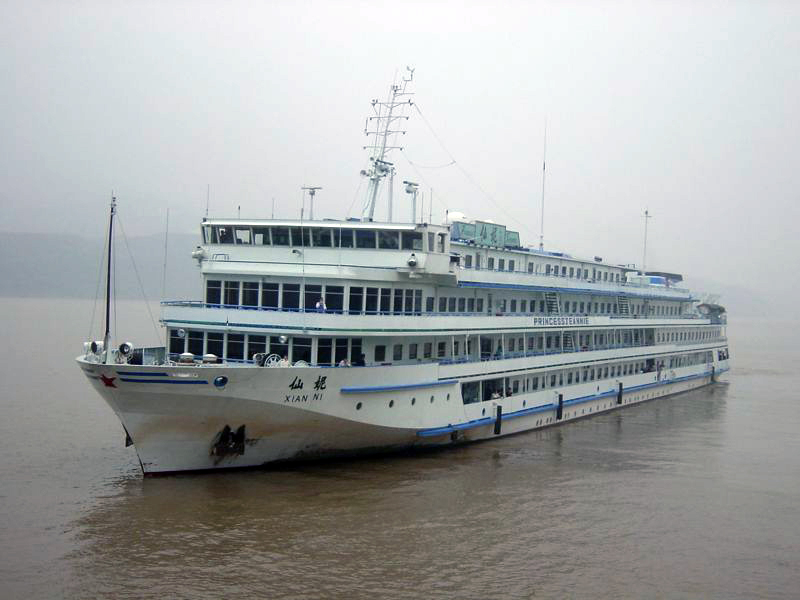
A typical cruise ship similar to Dongfang zhi Xing used to tour the Three Gorges rivers

Additional search efforts were made to locate survivors or bodies up to 220 kilometres (140 miles) downstream of the wreck. The Three Gorges Dam upriver was instructed to cut water flow rates by half in order to lower the river levels for the rescue effort.

On 5 June, the inverted ship was fitted with cables and nets, and the holes cut in the hull sealed, in order to right the ship and resume the search for survivors or bodies. The search yielded only bodies. The search range was subsequently expanded to 1,000 km (620 miles) downstream on 5 June.

The highest levels of government were involved in the search coordination. Communist Party General Secretary Xi Jinping and Chinese Premier Li Keqiang ordered rescue efforts. Premier Li Keqiang, Vice Premier Ma Kai and State Councilor Yang Jing traveled to the site.

== Mourning ==
On 7 June, more than 500 rescue workers and government officials at the site mourned during a three-minute silence, after an announcement from Minister of Transport Yang Chuantang. According to Chinese tradition, the seventh day is a key occasion to mourn the passing of the dead (头七).

To mourn the victims, all Chinese satellite television channels suspended entertainment programs from 7 to 8 June.

== See also ==
- List of shipwrecks in China
- MV Teratai Prima
- MV Princess of the Stars
