= Jianli =

Jianli 监利市 Kienli
- County-level city
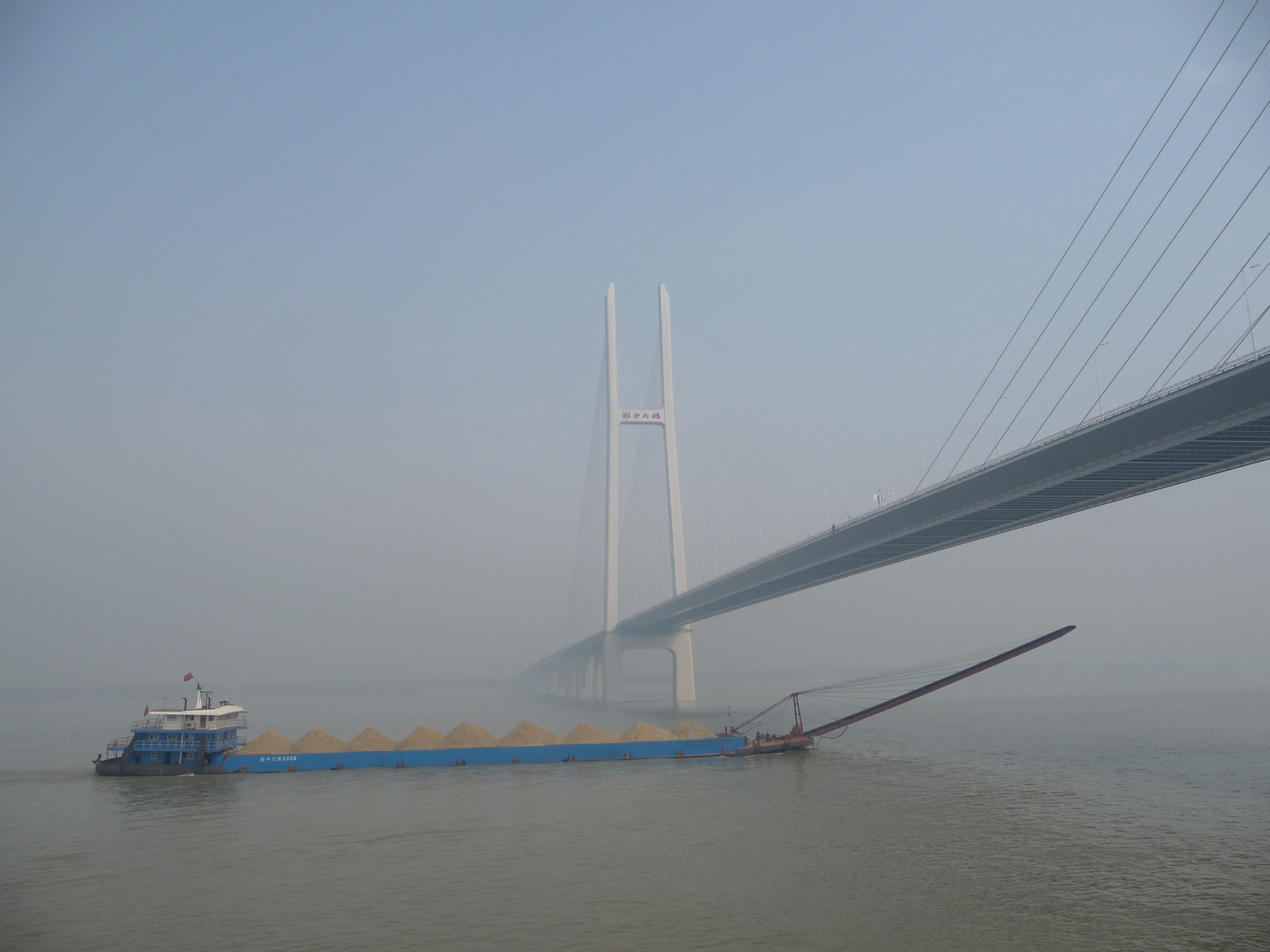
- Jingyue Yangtze River Bridge connects Jianli County to Yueyang in Hunan province

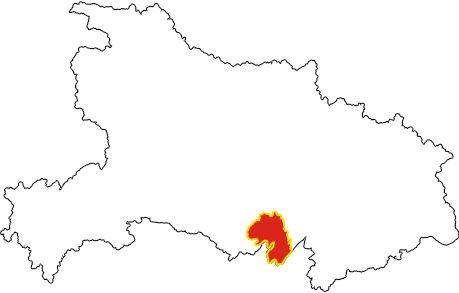
- Location in Hubei

- Location of the county seat in Hubei
- Coordinates: 29°50′25″N 112°54′17″E
- Country: People's Republic of China
- Province: Hubei
- Prefecture-level city: Jingzhou

Area
  - Total: 3,508 km^{2} (1,354 sq mi)

Population (2020)
  - Total: 1,120,822
  - Density: 319.5/km^{2} (827.5/sq mi)
- Time zone: UTC+8 (China Standard)
- Website: www.jianli.gov.cn

Jianli
- Traditional Chinese: 監利
- Simplified Chinese: 监利
- Postal: Kienli
Transcriptions
Standard Mandarin
- Hanyu Pinyin: Jiànlì
- Wade–Giles: Chien^{4}-li^{4}

Jianli (simplified Chinese: 监利; traditional Chinese: 監利; pinyin: Jiànlì; Wade–Giles: Chien^{4}-li^{4}) is a county-level city of southern Hubei Province, China, located on the northern (left) bank of the Yangtze River and bordering Hunan Province to the south. It is under the administration of Jingzhou City.

== Etymology ==
The character jian (監/监) is usually read as jiān, but is read as the less-commonly encountered pronunciation jiàn when used in the name Jianli.

Jianli center city name is Rongcheng (容城镇), the native people prefer to call Chengguan.

== Transport ==
Jianli has one Yangtze River crossing, the Jingyue Yangtze River Bridge, located in Bailuo (白螺镇).

== Economy ==
Jianli is rich in fresh water products, most of which are crayfish, and rice products.

== History ==
- On June 12, 2020, Jianli was approved to become a county-level city, under the direct administration of Hubei province and the delegating administration of Jingzhou City.
- During the night of 1 June 2015, the Dongfang zhi Xing capsized on the Yangtze River in Jianli County during severe weather.
- In the Three Kingdoms period, Sun Quan, Emperor of Eastern Wu, asked supervision of(监) profit (利) from fish and salt (监收鱼盐之利) and then came the current name: Jianli.

== Administrative divisions ==
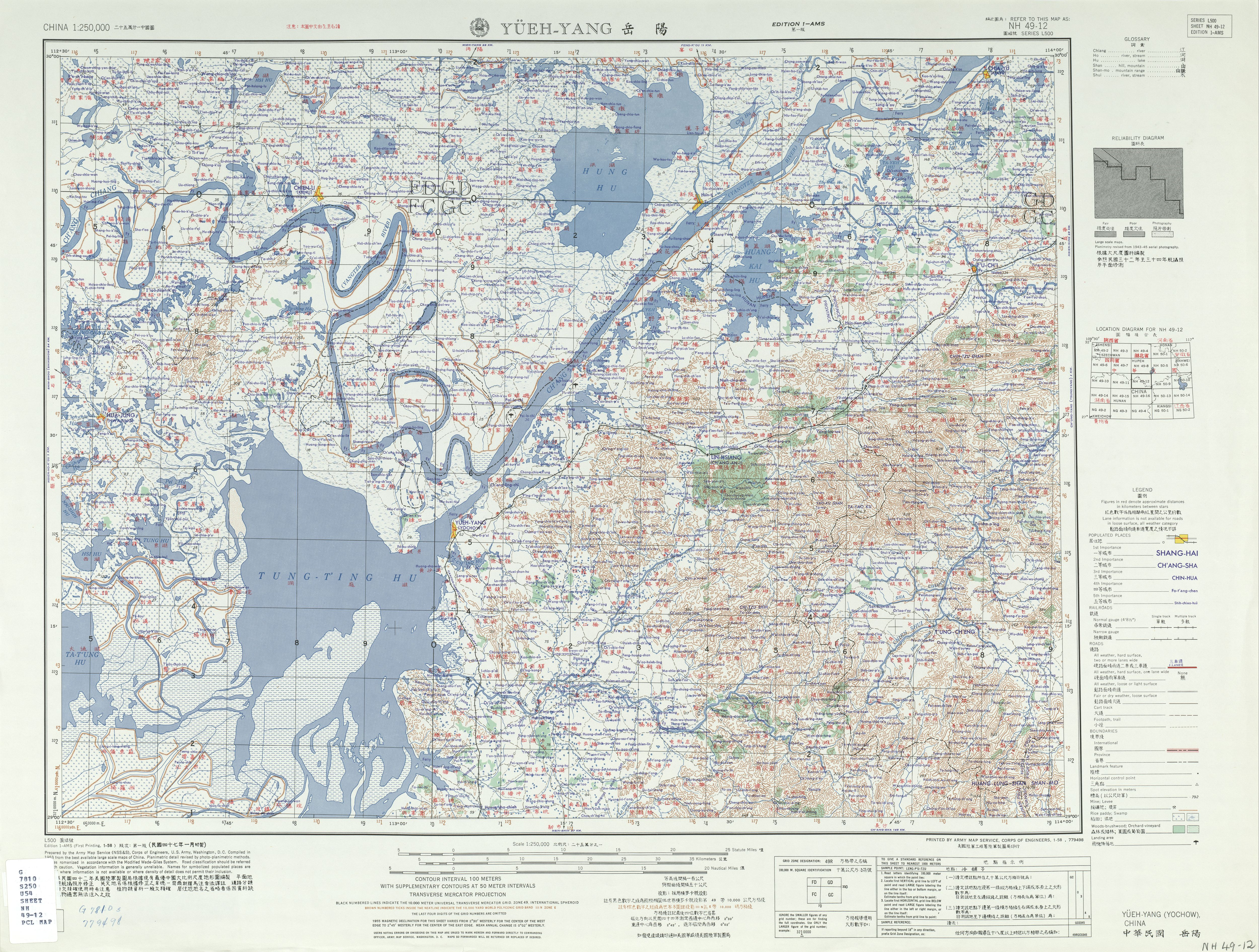
Map including Jianli (labeled as CHIEN-LI (KIENLI) 監利) (1953)

Eighteen towns:

- Rongcheng (容城镇), Zhuhe (朱河镇), Xingou (新沟镇), Gongchang (龚场镇), Zhoulaozui (周老嘴镇), Huangxiekou (黄歇口镇), Wangqiao (汪桥镇), Chengji (程集镇), Fenyan (分盐镇), Maoshi (毛市镇), Futiansi (福田寺镇), Shangchewan (上车湾镇), Bianhe (汴河镇), Chiba (尺八镇), Bailuo (白螺镇), Wangshi (网市镇), Sanzhou (三洲镇), Qiaoshi (桥市镇)

Three townships:

- Hongcheng Township (红城乡), Qipan Township (棋盘乡), Zhemu Township (柘木乡)

Two other areas:

- Dayuan (大垸农场), Huanghu (荒湖农场)

== Climate ==
Climate data for Jianli, elevation 26 m (85 ft), (1991–2020 normals, extremes 1981–2010)
Month	Jan	Feb	Mar	Apr	May	Jun	Jul	Aug	Sep	Oct	Nov	Dec	Year
Record high °C (°F)	22.6 (72.7)	27.6 (81.7)	31.8 (89.2)	34.2 (93.6)	35.5 (95.9)	37.5 (99.5)	38.9 (102.0)	39.2 (102.6)	37.1 (98.8)	34.6 (94.3)	31.4 (88.5)	23.0 (73.4)	39.2 (102.6)
Mean daily maximum °C (°F)	8.2 (46.8)	11.3 (52.3)	15.9 (60.6)	22.2 (72.0)	26.9 (80.4)	29.9 (85.8)	32.7 (90.9)	32.3 (90.1)	28.5 (83.3)	23.2 (73.8)	17.1 (62.8)	10.9 (51.6)	21.6 (70.9)
Daily mean °C (°F)	4.6 (40.3)	7.3 (45.1)	11.8 (53.2)	17.8 (64.0)	22.6 (72.7)	26.1 (79.0)	29.0 (84.2)	28.2 (82.8)	23.9 (75.0)	18.5 (65.3)	12.5 (54.5)	6.8 (44.2)	17.4 (63.4)
Mean daily minimum °C (°F)	2.0 (35.6)	4.3 (39.7)	8.5 (47.3)	14.3 (57.7)	19.2 (66.6)	23.1 (73.6)	26.0 (78.8)	25.1 (77.2)	20.5 (68.9)	15.0 (59.0)	9.2 (48.6)	3.8 (38.8)	14.3 (57.7)
Record low °C (°F)	−10.0 (14.0)	−4.6 (23.7)	−1.8 (28.8)	1.8 (35.2)	9.8 (49.6)	12.7 (54.9)	19.2 (66.6)	16.7 (62.1)	10.6 (51.1)	2.2 (36.0)	−2.3 (27.9)	−10.0 (14.0)	−10.0 (14.0)
Average precipitation mm (inches)	58.6 (2.31)	70.3 (2.77)	101.1 (3.98)	152.0 (5.98)	182.4 (7.18)	216.7 (8.53)	180.6 (7.11)	100.6 (3.96)	67.6 (2.66)	79.9 (3.15)	68.4 (2.69)	34.6 (1.36)	1,312.8 (51.68)
Average precipitation days (≥ 0.1 mm)	9.6	10.6	13.2	12.8	13.0	12.4	10.3	9.2	7.9	9.8	9.4	7.9	126.1
Average snowy days	4.3	2.6	1.0	0	0	0	0	0	0	0	0.1	1.5	9.5
Average relative humidity (%)	78	79	79	78	78	82	80	81	79	78	78	75	79
Mean monthly sunshine hours	87.4	85.3	108.9	135.9	151.1	145.7	206.5	207.8	156.2	138.7	124.5	113.8	1,661.8
Percentage possible sunshine	27	27	29	35	36	35	48	51	43	40	39	36	37
Source: China Meteorological Administration

== See also ==
- 48619 Jianli, a minor planet named after Jianli
- Wu Zixu, militarist and Wu general born in Jianli
