= Royal Captain (East Indiaman) =

At least two vessels named Royal Captain sailed as East Indiamen for the British East India Company:

- Royal Captain (1760 ship): launched in 1760 and made four voyages to India, the East Indies, and China between 1761 and 1771.
- Royal Captain (1772 ship): launched in 1772 and wrecked in 1773 in the South China Sea.
