= Jingyue Yangtze River Bridge =

Jingyue Bridge 荆岳长江大桥
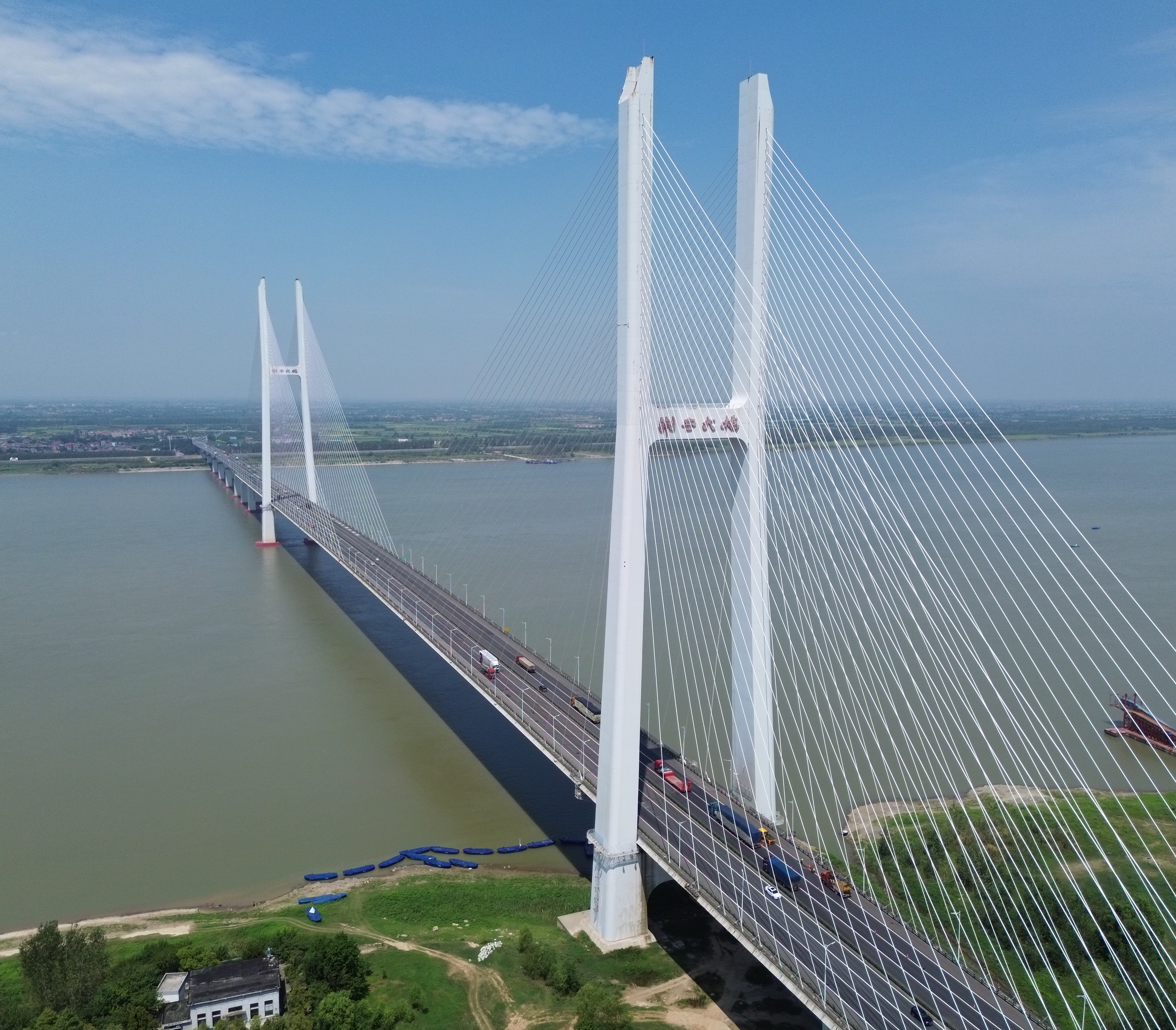
- Coordinates: 29°32′38″N 113°13′23″E
- Carries: G0421 Xuchang–Guangzhou Expressway
- Crosses: Yangtze River
- Locale: Jianli, Hubei–Yueyang, Hunan, China
- Other name: Jingyue Dàqiáo

Characteristics
- Design: Asymmetric cable-stayed bridge
- Material: Steel, concrete
- Total length: 5,419 m (17,779 ft)
- Height: 265.5 m (871 ft) (north tower); 224.5 m (737 ft) (south tower)
- Longest span: 816 m (2,677 ft)
- No. of lanes: 6

History
- Construction end: June 2010

Statistics
- Toll: Yes

Location
- Interactive map of Jingyue Bridge

The Jingyue Yangtze River Bridge (simplified Chinese: 荆岳大桥; traditional Chinese: 荊岳大橋; pinyin: Jīngyuè Dàqiáo) is a cable-stayed bridge over the Yangtze River between Jianli County, Hubei Province and Yueyang, Hunan Province in central China. The Bridge opened in June 2010. The bridge crosses the Yangtze River and is one of the largest cable-stayed bridges in the world. The bridge was tolled a few months after opening.

== See also ==
- Bridges and tunnels across the Yangtze River
- List of bridges in China
- List of longest cable-stayed bridge spans
- List of tallest bridges in the world
