= Atago Maru =

Merchant ship

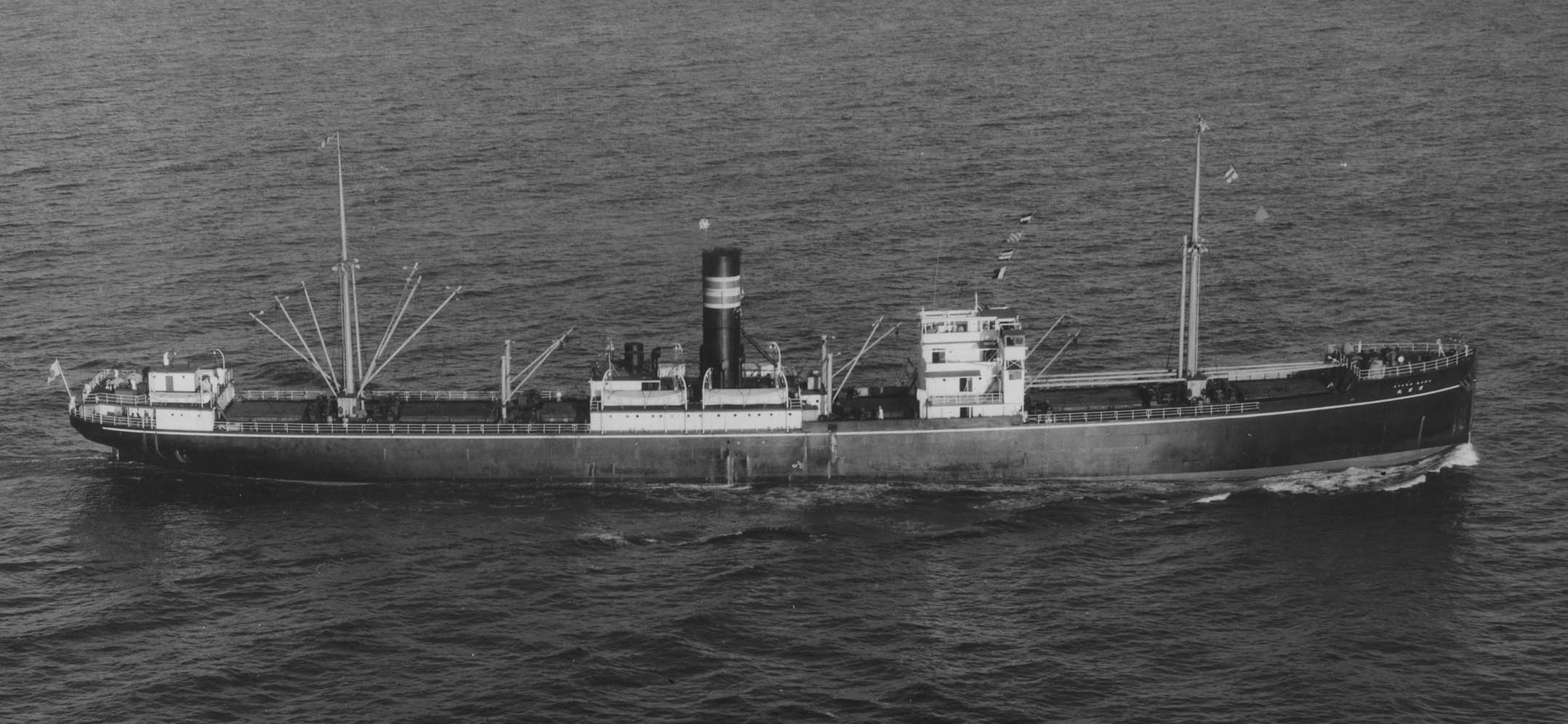
- Atago Maru, October 1937

History
- Name: Atago Maru
- Owner: NYK Line
- Port of registry: (Empire of Japan) Tokyo
- Builder: Lithgows & Sons, Glasgow
- Yard number: 762
- Launched: 17 June 1924
- Completed: 28 November 1924
- Fate: Sunk, 28 November 1944

General characteristics as built
- Type: Passenger-cargo ship
- Tonnage: 7,543 GRT
- Length: 134.1 m (440 ft 0 in) pp
- Beam: 17.4 m (57 ft 1 in)
- Installed power: 2,000 hp (1,491 kW)
- Propulsion: 2 × Sulzer diesel engines; 2 screws
- Speed: 13 knots (24 km/h; 15 mph)
- Notes: Converted to carry oil in 1943

Atago Maru was a merchant ship built prior to World War II in Glasgow in 1924 by Lithgows & Sons for Nippon Yusen. One of the first diesel-engined cargo ships in service in Japan, Atago Maru was converted to an oil tanker in 1942. Returning to service in 1943, the ship saw extensive service traveling in convoys during World War II. On 28 November 1944, the vessel was bombed by a United States Army Air Forces bomber while at anchor off Borneo. The shipwreck is a popular diving site in Malaysia.

== Description ==
As built, Atago Maru was a Japanese cargo ship measured at 7,543 gross register tons (GRT), 134.1 m (440 ft 0 in) long between perpendiculars with a beam of 17.4 m (57 ft 1 in). The ship was powered by twin Sulzer diesel engines and two screws rated at 2,000 horsepower (1,491 kW). The vessel had a maximum speed of 13 knots (24 km/h; 15 mph). In 1942, the vessel was converted to transport oil.

== Career ==
Atago Maru was built as a general cargo freighter for Nippon Yusen by Lithgows & Sons at Glasgow, Scotland with the yard number 762. The vessel was launched on 17 June 1924 and completed on 28 November later that year. Atago Maru was one of the first diesel-engined ships under Japanese registry. The cargo ship operated between Kobe / Yokohama and the west coast of the United States and Canada, where Atago Maru found great success on the Seattle route.

With the outbreak of war between Japan and the Allies in 1941, the cargo ship's cross-Pacific career ended. On 3 August 1942, Atago Maru joined Convoy 425 sailing from Cap St Jacques, Vietnam bound for Mako, Pescadores. On 28 December, Atago Maru began conversion to an emergency oil tanker at Sasebo Naval Arsenal, Japan.

The ship completed conversion and returned to service on 14 February 1943. On 15 June, Atago Maru joined Convoy 586 from Cap St Jacques and arrived at Singapore on 18 June. The ship returned to Cap St Jacques and joined Convoy 412, departing on 23 July. On 15 August, Atago Maru sailed from Moji, Japan for Takao, Formosa as part of Convoy 187 and arrived on 20 August. In December, the oil tanker headed to the Philippines, sailing from Zamboanga for Jolo and Tawi Tawi on 30 December.

In 1944, Atago Maru returned to Japan. The oil tanker departed Moji in Convoy MOTA-07 on 1 March, arriving at Takao on 9 March. On 21 March, the ship sailed from Takao as part of Convoy TAMA-12 and arrived at Manila, Philippines on 24 March. On 18 June, Atago Maru joined Convoy MI-05 departing from Manila and arrived at Miri, Borneo on 23 June. Four days later the oil tanker joined Convoy MI-06 sailing for Moji, arriving on 17 July after stops at Manila and Takao. On 26 July, sailing with Convoy MI-13, Atago Maru departs Moji. After stopping at Takao, the convoy came under attack on 7 August by a US submarine, which sink one of the cargo ships, before arriving at Manila on 8 August. On 11 August, the convoy departs Manila for Miri, and is attacked the following day by US submarines, which sink two of the convoy. The convoy arrived at Miri on 18 August.

On 29 August, Atago Maru joined Convoy MI-14 departing Miri, making stops at Manila and Takao, and reaching Moji on 20 September. On 3 November, the oil tanker departed Moji for Miri as part of Convoy MI-25. On 15 November, the convoy is attacked by US submarines, with three merchant vessels lost. The convoy arrived at Miri on 16 November. On 28 November 1944, while at anchor just offshore of the Lutong refinery, Atago Maru was bombed and sunk by Consolidated B-24 Liberator bombers of the United States Army Air Forces Thirteenth Air Force at 04°29′N 114°00′E.

== Wreck ==
Atago Maru rests upright in 14 metres (46 ft) of water, about one mile (1.6 km) offshore. Initially much of the superstructure and masts remained above water, but monsoon waves destroyed the superstructure and what remained went underwater as the ship settled in the mud. The ship's masts were still visible above the waterline until the 1980s. The wreck is a popular dive site.

== Sources ==
- Furuta, Ryoichi & Hirai, Yoshikazu (1967). A Short History of Japanese Merchant Shipping. Translated by Macfarlane, Duncan. Tokyo: Tokyo New Service. OCLC 833174425.
- Hackett, Bob (2016). "Atago Maru: Tabular Record of Movement". combinedfleet.com. Archived from the original on 19 April 2019.
- "Atago Maru (4030916)". Miramar Ship Index.
- Svrcula, Kurt (2013) [2004]. Diving in Malaysia: A Guide to the Best Dives of Sabah, Sarawak & Peninsular Malaysia (Updated ed.). Singapore: Marshall Cavendish International. ISBN 978-981-4398-32-9.
