= HMS Hope (1910) =

Destroyer of the Royal Navy

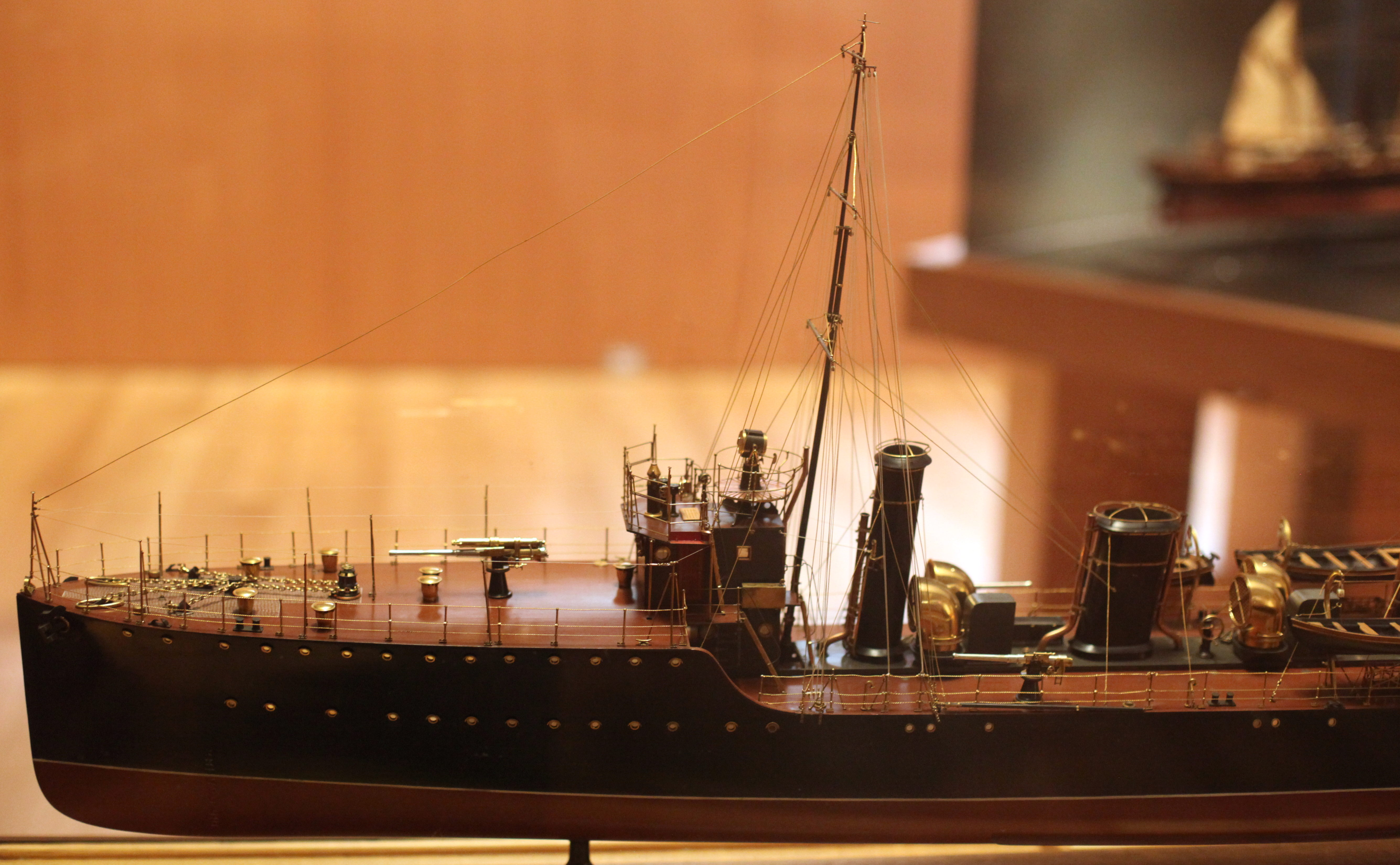
- Scale model of Hope at the Art Gallery of Ontario

History

United Kingdom
- Name: Hope
- Builder: Swan Hunter, Wallsend
- Laid down: 5 December 1909
- Launched: 6 September 1910
- Commissioned: March 1911
- Out of service: February 1920
- Fate: Sold to be broken up

General characteristics
- Class & type: Acorn-class destroyer
- Displacement: 745 long tons (757 t) (normal)
- Length: 246 ft (75 m) o.a.
- Beam: 25 ft 5 in (7.7 m)
- Draught: 8 ft 6 in (2.6 m)
- Installed power: 4 Yarrow boilers 13,500 shp (10,100 kW)
- Propulsion: Parsons steam turbines, 3 shafts
- Speed: 27 kn (50 km/h; 31 mph)
- Range: 1,540 nmi (2,850 km; 1,770 mi) at 15 kn (28 km/h; 17 mph)
- Complement: 72
- Armament: 2 × single BL 4 in (102 mm) guns; 2 × single QF 12 pdr 3 in (76 mm) gun; 2 × single 21 in (533 mm) torpedo tubes

HMS Hope was the first warship constructed by Swan Hunter and one of 20 Acorn class (later H-class) destroyers built for the Royal Navy that served in the First World War. The Acorn class were smaller than the preceding Beagle class but oil-fired and better armed. Launched in 1910, Hope served with the Second Destroyer Flotilla of the Grand Fleet as an escort based at Devonport for most of the war, protecting ships like RMS Aquitania, until being transferred to Malta to serve with the Fifth Destroyer Flotilla as part of the Mediterranean Fleet in 1917. Hope collided with and sank the destroyer HMS Arno in 1918. After the Armistice, the destroyer continued to serve in Malta under being sold in 1920.

== Design and description ==
After the coal-burning Beagle class, the Acorn-class destroyer saw a return to oil-firing. Pioneered by the Tribal class of 1905 and HMS Swift of 1907, using oil enabled a more efficient design, leading to a smaller vessel which also had increased deck space available for weaponry. Unlike previous designs, where the individual yards had been given discretion within the parameters set by the Admiralty, the Acorn class were a set, with the machinery the only major variation between the different ships. This enabled costs to be reduced. The class was later renamed H class.

Hope was 240-foot (73 m) long between perpendiculars and 246 ft (75 m) overall, with a beam of 25 ft 5 in (7.7 m) and a deep draught of 8 ft 6 in (2.6 m). Displacement was 745 long tons (834 short tons; 757 tonnes) normal and 855 long tons (869 t) full load. Power was provided by Parsons steam turbines, fed by four Yarrow boilers constructed by the Wallsend Slipway and Engineering Company. Parsons supplied a complex of seven turbines, a high-pressure and two low pressure for high speed, two turbines for cruising and two for running astern, driving three shafts. The high-pressure turbine drove the centre shaft, the remainder being distributed to the wing-shafts. Three funnels were fitted, the foremost tall and thin, the central short and thick and the aft narrow. The engines were rated at 13,500 shaft horsepower (10,100 kW) and design speed was 27 knots (50 km/h; 31 mph). On trial, Hope achieved 27.1 knots (50.2 km/h; 31.2 mph), a speed exceeded by the rest of the class. The vessel carried 170 long tons (170 t) of fuel oil which gave a range was 1,540 nautical miles (2,850 km; 1,770 mi) at a cruising speed of 15 kn (28 km/h; 17 mph).

The more efficient use of deck space enabled a larger armament to be mounted. A single BL 4 in (102 mm) Mk VIII gun was carried on the forecastle and another aft. Two single QF 12-pounder (3 in (76 mm)) guns were mounted between the first two funnels. Two rotating 21-inch (533 mm) torpedo tubes were mounted aft of the funnels, with two reloads carried, and a searchlight fitted between the tubes. The destroyer was later modified to carry a single Vickers QF 3-pounder (47 mm (2 in)) anti-aircraft gun and depth charges for anti-submarine warfare. The ship's complement was 72 officers and ratings.

== Construction and career ==
The 20 destroyers of the Acorn class were ordered by the Admiralty under the 1909–1910 Naval Programme. The only one of the class sourced from Swan Hunter & Wigham Richardson, Hope was laid down at the company's Wallsend shipyard on 5 December 1909, launched on 6 September 1910, and commissioned at Portsmouth on 4 March 1911. The ship was the first warship built at the yard and the most recent in a line of seventeen ships in Royal Navy service to bear the name.

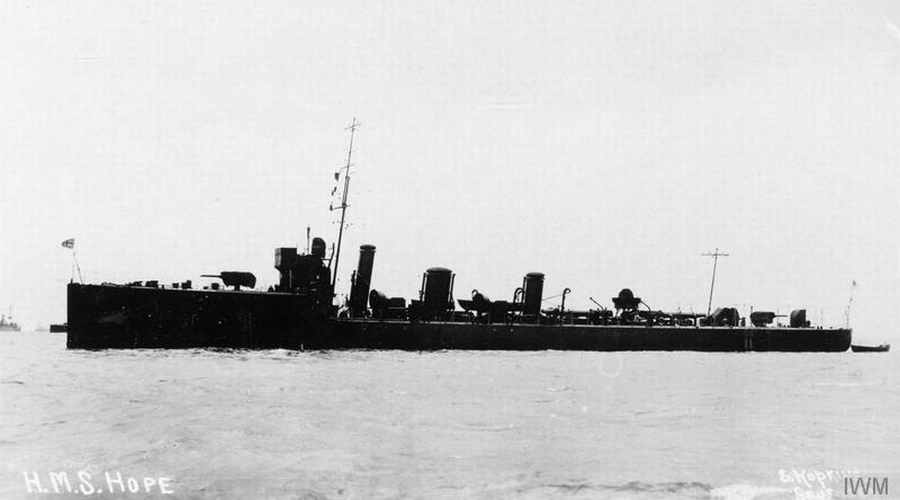
HMS Hope

In April 1912, the Royal Navy reorganised its destroyer and torpedo boat forces, with Hope joining the newly established 4th Destroyer Flotilla, based at Portland. By March 1913, Hope was part of the Second Destroyer Flotilla. On 22 March 1913, Hope was being fuelled at Cromarty when a fire occurred, injuring five men, of which four were seriously injured. On 9 May 1913, an officer was swept overboard by heavy seas and drowned, and the ship's engineer knocked down by the seas and badly injured when Hope was leaving Longhope, Orkney to set course for Kirkwall. In August 1914, the Flotilla became part of the Grand Fleet and the destroyers were deployed to Devonport to undertake escort duties. On 30 July 1915, Hope escorted the liner RMS Aquitania transporting troops to the Mediterranean, and SS Commodore which undertook the journey between Liverpool and Dublin every night. On 5 March 1916, the vessel rescued the crew of the merchant ship SS Rothesay. On 3 December 1916, the vessel returned from Dover to Devonport after a short detachment there.

On 23 January 1917, the destroyer rescued the crew of the Dutch merchant ship SS Salland, sunk twenty minutes prior by the German submarine SM U-53. Later that year, Hope was transferred to the Fifth Destroyer Flotilla as part of the Mediterranean Fleet under the protected cruiser HMS Blenheim. On 20 January 1918, the destroyer was attached to the Aegean Squadron, based at Malta. While serving in the eastern Mediterranean, Hope collided with the destroyer HMS Arno on 23 March, sinking the smaller vessel.

After the Armistice, the Royal Navy returned to a peacetime level of strength and both the number of ships and the amount of staff needed to be reduced to save money. Hope continued to serve in the Mediterranean Fleet but was paid off in 1919. The vessel was sold for breaking up at Malta in February 1920.

== Pennant numbers ==
| Pennant number | Date |
|---|---|
| H48 | December 1914 |
| H41 | January 1918 |
| H68 | January 1919 |
