= Niitaka-class cruiser =

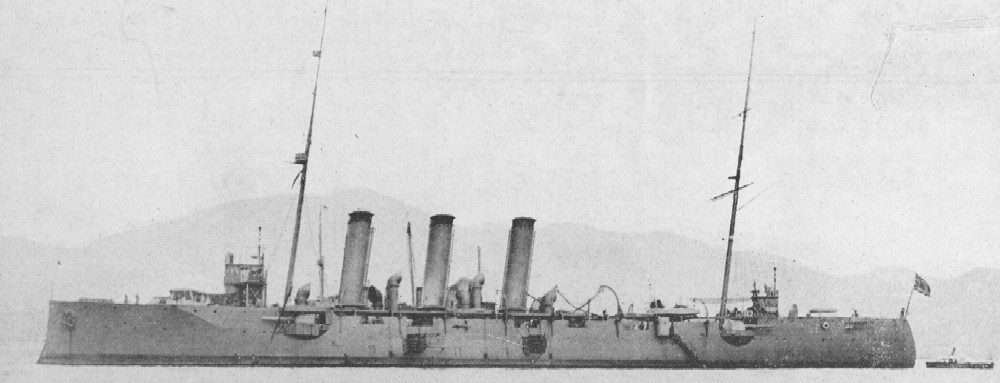
- Niitaka in 1922

Class overview
- Name: Niitaka class
- Builders: Yokosuka Naval Arsenal (Niitaka); Kure Naval Arsenal (Tsushima)
- Operators: Imperial Japanese Navy
- Built: 1901–1904
- In commission: 1904–1936
- Completed: 2
- Lost: 1

General characteristics
- Type: Protected cruiser
- Displacement: 3,366 long tons (3,420 t)
- Length: 102 m (334 ft 8 in) w/l
- Beam: 13.44 m (44 ft 1 in)
- Draft: 4.92 m (16 ft 2 in)
- Propulsion: 2-shaft VTE reciprocating engines; 16 boilers; 9,500 hp (7,100 kW)
- Speed: 20 knots (23 mph; 37 km/h)
- Complement: 287–320
- Armament: 6 × QF 6 inch /40 naval guns; 10 × QF 12 pounder 12 cwt naval gun; 4 × QF 3 pounder Hotchkiss guns
- Armor: Deck: 76 mm (3 in); Conning tower: 100 mm (4 in)

The two Niitaka-class cruisers (新高型防護巡洋艦, Niitaka-gata bōgojun'yōkan) were protected cruisers operated by the Imperial Japanese Navy. Both participated in numerous actions during the Russo-Japanese War and in World War I.

== Background ==
The Niitaka class was the second cruiser class built to a completely Japanese design and was ordered as part of the 2nd Emergency Fleet Replenishment Program, with a budget acquired by the indemnity awarded to Japan by the Treaty of Shimonoseki ending the First Sino-Japanese War. These small cruisers were intended for high speed reconnaissance. The lead ship Niitaka was built at the Yokosuka Naval Arsenal, Yokosuka, Kanagawa, which already had considerable experiencing in building small cruisers. Its sister ship, Tsushima, was built at the new Kure Naval Arsenal, at Kure, Hiroshima and took considerably longer to complete.

== Design ==
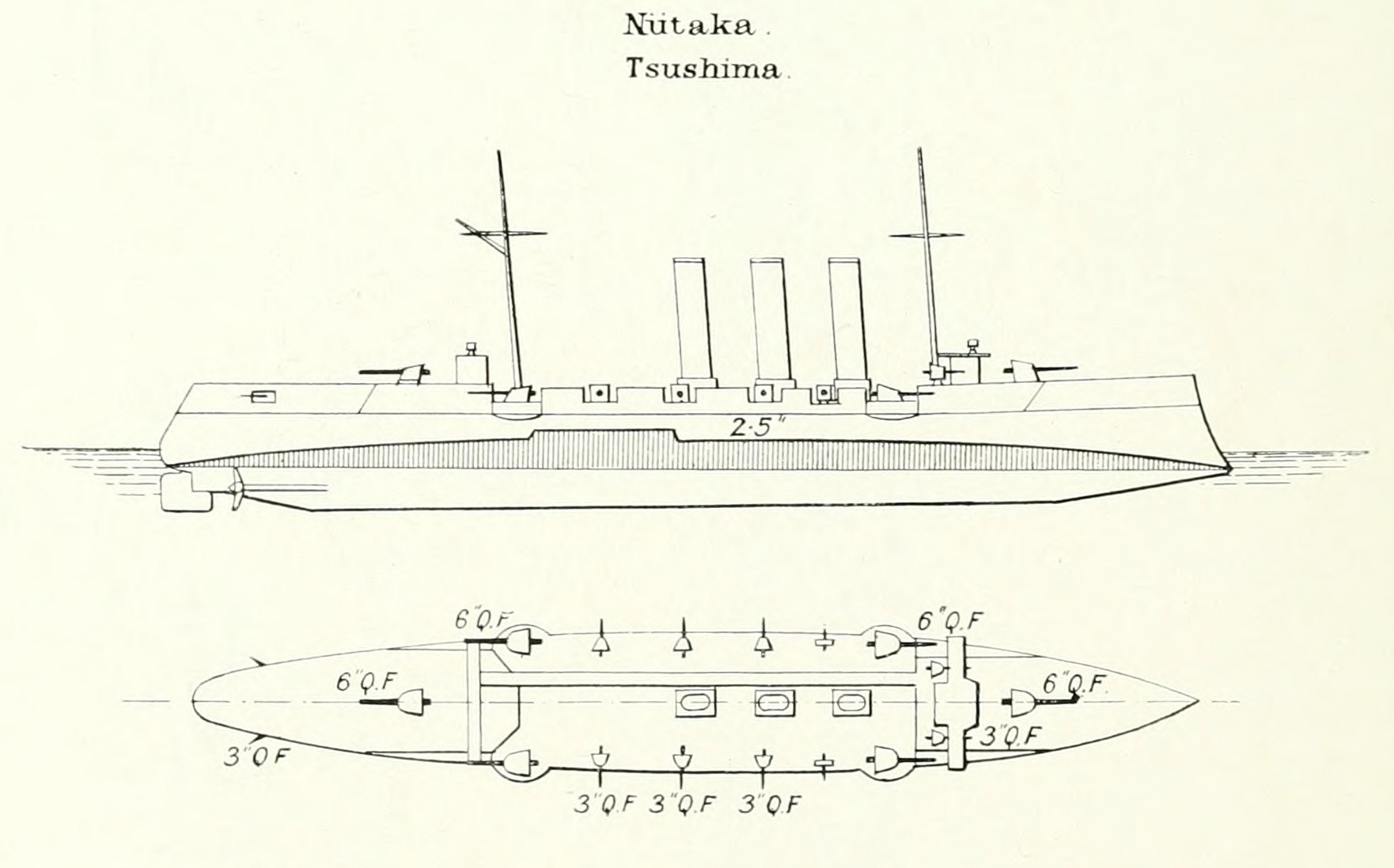
As depicted in Brassey's Naval Annual 1902

In terms of design, the Niitaka class was very conservative in layout and similar to, but somewhat larger and the earlier Japanese-designed Suma. The increased displacement, heavier armor and lower center of gravity resulted in a more seaworthy and powerful vessel than Suma, and enabled Tsushima to outclass many other contemporary protected cruisers.

In terms of armament, the Niitaka-class cruisers were not equipped with torpedoes. Observing problems experienced by the United States Navy during the Spanish–American War with torpedo reliability and the dangers of sympathetic detonation, it was decided not to use this weapon on the new cruisers. The main battery was standardized to the QF 6 inch /40 naval gun used on most contemporary Japanese cruisers.

The Niitaka-class cruisers were fitted with 16 Niclausse boilers, a great improvement on the locomotive boilers of Suma.

== Ships in class ==
Two Niitaka-class cruisers were built. Both were lost before the start of World War II.

Niitaka

Ordered in 1897, launched 15 November 1902, and completed 27 January 1904, Niitaka played a major role in the Russo-Japanese War. During World War I, Niitaka participated at the Battle of Tsingtao and was subsequently assigned to patrol of shipping lanes in Southeast Asia, and in the Indian Ocean from its base at Cape Town. After the war, the ship served during Japan's Siberian Intervention. The cruiser was lost after running aground in a typhoon on 26 August 1923 on the coast of Kamchatka.

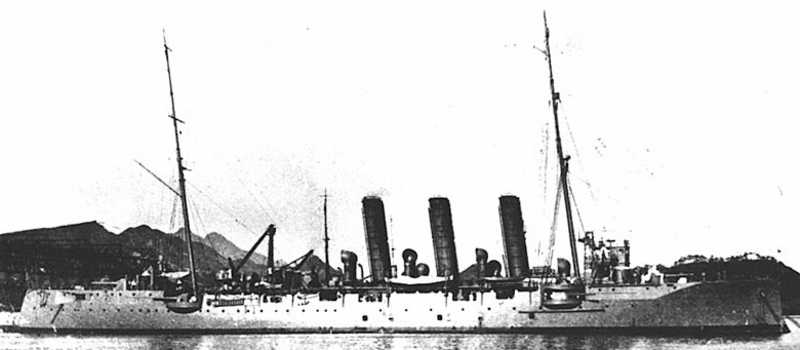
Tsushima

Tsushima

Ordered in 1897, launched 15 December 1902, and completed 14 February 1904, Tsushima participated in the closing stages of the Russo-Japanese War. In World War I, Tsushima played an active role in the Battle of Tsingtao and pursuit of the German East Asia Squadron. The ship was subsequently assigned to Cape Town, where the cruiser assisted its sister ship Niitaka in patrol of shipping lanes in the Indian Ocean. The ship subsequently was used in the Siberian Intervention. Tsushima was struck from the navy list in 1936 and expended as a torpedo target in 1944.
