= List of ships sunk by the Imperial Japanese Navy =

This list of military ships sunk by the Imperial Japanese Navy lists all vessels sunk by ships commissioned in the Imperial Japanese Navy, and by Japanese naval aircraft, listed alphabetically by ship name.

== Australia ==
- HMAS Armidale: Australian corvette sunk 1 December 1942 by Japanese aircraft.
- HMAS Canberra: Australian heavy cruiser fatally damaged 9 August 1942 by gunfire from heavy cruisers Chōkai, Furutaka, Kako, and Aoba during Battle of Savo Island, and scuttled later in the day.
- AHS Centaur: Australian hospital ship torpedoed on 14 May 1943 by Japanese submarine I-177 off the coast of Queensland.
- SS Fingal: Norwegian merchant ship on charter to the Australian Government on 5 May 1943 torpedoed by the Japanese submarine I-180
- HMAS Kuttabul: Australian depot ship sunk 31 May 1942 by a Japanese midget submarine launched from I-24 during the attack on Sydney Harbour
- HMAS Mavie: Australian patrol boat sunk 19 February 1942 by aircraft in Darwin Harbour.
- Neptuna: Australian merchant ship sunk 19 February 1942 by aircraft in Darwin Harbour.
- HMAS Patricia Cam: Australian general purpose vessel sunk 22 January 1943 by an IJN floatplane near the Wessel Islands.
- HMAS Perth: Australian light cruiser torpedoed and sunk by destroyers Harukaze, Murakumo, and Shirakumo 1 March 1942, Battle of Sunda Strait.
- HMAS Vampire: Australian destroyer sunk 9 April 1942 by dive bombers from aircraft carrier Akagi during the Indian Ocean raid.
- HMAS Voyager Australian destroyer sunk 25 September 1942 by land-based naval aircraft.
- HMAS Yarra: Australian sloop sunk 4 March 1942 by Japanese cruisers Atago and Takao and destroyer Nowaki.

== Britain ==
=== Warships ===
- HMS Cicala: British gunboat sunk 21 December 1941 during an air raid on Hong Kong Harbor.
- HMS Cornwall: British heavy cruiser sunk 5 April 1942 by Kido Butai aircraft during the Indian Ocean raid.
- HMS Dorsetshire: British heavy cruiser sunk 5 April 1942 by Kido Butai aircraft during the Indian Ocean raid.
- HMS Dragonfly: British gunboat sunk in the Banka Strait, 14 February 1942.
- HMS Electra: British destroyer sunk 27 February 1942 by gunfire from destroyer Asagumo during the Battle of the Java Sea.
- HMS Encounter: British destroyer sunk 1 March 1942 by gunfire from heavy cruisers Myōkō and Ashigara and destroyers Kawakaze and Yamakaze
- HMS Exeter: British heavy cruiser crippled by shell from heavy cruiser Haguro, later finished off by Haguro and three sisterships, Battle of Java Sea, 27 February – 1 March.
- HMS Grasshopper: British gunboat sunk in the Banka Strait by land-based aircraft, 14 February 1942.
- HMS Hermes: British aircraft carrier sunk 9 April 1942 by bombers from aircraft carriers Shōkaku and Zuikaku during the Indian Ocean raid.
- HMS Hollyhock: British corvette sunk 9 April 1942 by bombers from aircraft carrier Sōryū during the Indian Ocean raid.
- HMS Pathfinder: British destroyer heavily damaged on 11 February 1945 by aircraft off Ramree Island, Burma. Not repaired and scrapped.
- HMS Peterel: British gunboat sunk by naval gunfire at Shanghai 8 December 1941.
- HMS Porpoise: British submarine sunk 1945 by aircraft possibly assisted by naval escorts.
- HMS Prince of Wales: British battleship sunk 10 December 1941 by land-based aircraft near Malaya.
- HMS Repulse: British battlecruiser sunk 10 December 1941 by land-based aircraft near Malaya.
- HMS Scorpion: British gunboat sunk 13 February 1942 by naval gunfire from light cruiser Yura and destroyers Fubuki and Asagiri.
- HMS Stonehenge: British submarine, overdue and assumed mined 1944.
- HMS Stratagem: British submarine sunk 22 November 1944 by sub-chaser CH-35.
- HMS Stronghold: British destroyer sunk on 1 March 1942 by heavy cruiser Maya and destroyers Nowaki and Arashi.
- HMS Tenedos: British destroyer sunk by aircraft from carrier Zuikaku 5 April 1942 during the Indian Ocean raid.
- HMS Thanet: British destroyer sunk on 27 January 1942 by light cruiser Sendai and destroyers Fubuki, Hatsuyuki, Amagiri, and Asagiri.
- HMS Thracian: British destroyer badly damaged by bombing 16 December 1941 and scuttled. Later raised by the Japanese and put into service as PB-101.

=== Auxiliaries ===
- HMS Li Wo: British gunboat sunk 13 February 1942 by naval gunfire from light cruiser Yura and destroyers Fubuki and Asagiri.
- HMS St. Breock: British rescue tug bombed and sunk by Japanese aircraft off Sumatra on 14 February 1942.

== Netherlands ==
- HNLMS De Ruyter: Dutch light cruiser sunk 27 February 1942 by torpedo from heavy cruiser Haguro during Battle of the Java Sea.
- HNLMS Evertsen: Dutch destroyer forced aground by destroyers Murakumo and Shirakumo.
- HNLMS Java: Dutch light cruiser sunk 27 February 1942 by torpedo from heavy cruiser Nachi during Battle of Java Sea.
- HNLMS K VII: Dutch submarine sunk 18 February 1942 by land-based naval bombers while in Surabaya harbor.
- HNLMS K X: Dutch submarine fatally damaged on 1 March 1942 by destroyer Amatsukaze, scuttled in harbor the next day.
- HNLMS K XVI: Dutch submarine sunk 25 December 1941 by submarine I-166.
- HNLMS K XVIII: Dutch submarine damaged 24 January 1942 by depth charges from submarine chaser CH-12, which later force her scuttling.
- HNLMS Kortenaer: Dutch destroyer sunk by torpedo fired by heavy cruiser Haguro during Battle of the Java Sea.
- HNLMS O 20: Dutch submarine sunk 19 December 1941 by destroyer Uranami.
- HNLMS Piet Hein: Dutch destroyer torpedoed and sunk by destroyer Asashio during the battle of Badung Strait, 19 February 1942.
- HNLMS Prins van Oranje: Dutch minelayer sunk 11 January 1942 by destroyer Yamakaze and patrol boat P38.
- HNLMS Van Nes: Dutch destroyer sunk 17 February 1942 by planes from light carrier Ryūjō.

== New Zealand ==
- HMNZS Moa (T233): New Zealand minesweeper sunk on 7 April 1943 by aircraft at Tulagi Harbour in the Solomon Islands
- (Honorable mention) HMNZS Leander: New Zealand light cruiser damaged by torpedo from destroyer Yukikaze so badly she could not be repaired in time to take further part in WW2 and never served as a New Zealand warship again, battle of Kolombangara, 13 July 1943.

== United States ==
=== Aircraft Carriers ===
- USS Hornet: American aircraft carrier functionally sunk by aircraft carriers Shōkaku and Zuikaku; scuttled by Japanese destroyers Akigumo and Makigumo after being abandoned during the Battle of the Santa Cruz Islands, 26 October 1942.
- USS Lexington: American aircraft carrier sunk on 8 May 1942 by aircraft carriers Shōkaku and Zuikaku during the Battle of the Coral Sea.
- USS Wasp: American aircraft carrier sunk on 15 September 1942 by Japanese submarine I-19 while escorting transports to Guadalcanal.
- USS Yorktown: American aircraft carrier sunk from 5-7 June 1942, crippled by aircraft carrier Hiryū, later finished off by submarine I-168 during Battle of Midway.
- USS Princeton: American aircraft carrier sunk on 24 October 1944 by land based aircraft during the Battle of Leyte Gulf, 24 October 1944.

=== Escort Carriers ===
- USS Bismarck Sea: American escort carrier sunk on 21 February 1945 by kamikaze aircraft during the invasion of Iwo Jima.
- USS Gambier Bay: American escort carrier sunk on 25 October 1944 by naval gunfire primarily from battleship Yamato in the Battle off Samar in Leyte Gulf.
- USS Liscome Bay: American escort carrier sunk on 24 November 1943 by the Japanese submarine I-175 of the island of Makin.
- USS Ommaney Bay: American escort carrier sunk on 4 January 1945 by kamikaze aircraft.
- USS St. Lo: American escort carrier sunk on 25 October 1944 by kamikaze aircraft while in the Battle off Samar in Leyte Gulf. She was the first major warship to be sunk by kamikaze attacks.

=== Battleships ===
- USS Arizona: American battleship sunk 7 December 1941 by dive bombers from aircraft carrier Hiryū during the attack on Pearl Harbor.
- USS California: American battleship sunk 7 December 1941 by torpedo bombers from aircraft carriers Kaga and Sōryū during the attack on Pearl Harbor. Later raised, modernized, and sent back into combat.
- USS West Virginia: American battleship sunk 7 December 1941 by aircraft from carriers Akagi and Kaga during the attack on Pearl Harbor. Later raised, modernized, and sent back into combat.
- USS Oklahoma: American battleship sunk 7 December 1941 by aircraft from carriers Akagi and Kaga during the attack on Pearl Harbor. Later raised and sank while under tow to the scrappers.

=== Cruisers ===
- USS Astoria: American heavy cruiser sunk on 9 August 1942 by gunfire from heavy cruisers Chōkai, Furutaka, Aoba, and Kinugasa at the Battle of Savo Island.
- USS Atlanta: American light cruiser sunk torpedoed and sunk by destroyer Ikazuchi at the Naval Battle of Guadalcanal 13 November 1942.
- USS Chicago: American heavy cruiser sunk on 30 January 1943 by land-based torpedo bombers during the Battle of Rennell Island.
- USS Helena: American light cruiser torpedoed and sunk by destroyers Suzukaze and Tanikaze during the Battle of Kula Gulf.
- USS Houston: American heavy cruiser sunk 1 March 1942 by torpedoes and gunfire from heavy cruisers Mogami and Mikuma and destroyer Shikinami during the Battle of Sunda Strait.
- USS Indianapolis: American heavy cruiser sunk on 30 July 1945 by Japanese submarine I-58 between Guam and the Philippines.
- USS Juneau: American light cruiser sunk on 13 November 1942 the Naval Battle of Guadalcanal; crippled by torpedo from destroyer Amatsukaze, finished off by torpedo from submarine I-26.
- USS Northampton: American heavy cruiser sunk torpedoed and sunk by destroyers Kagerō and Makinami 30 November 1942 during the Battle of Tassafaronga.
- USS Quincy: American heavy cruiser sunk on 9 August 1942 by torpedoes and naval gunfire by heavy cruisers Aoba and Furutaka and light cruiser Tenryū at the Battle of Savo Island.
- USS Vincennes: American heavy cruiser sunk by gunfire from heavy cruisers Kako and Kinugasa and torpedoes from heavy cruiser Chōkai and light cruiser Yūbari at Battle of Savo Island, 9 August 1942.

=== Destroyers ===
- USS Aaron Ward: Sunk by aircraft from carrier Jun'yō off Guadalcanal, 7 April 1943.
- USS Abner Read: Sunk by Kamikaze, 1 November 1944
- USS Barton: Torpedoed and sunk by destroyer Amatsukaze during Naval battle of Guadalcanal, 13 November 1942
- USS Benham: Scuttled following torpedo hit, possibly from destroyer Shirayuki, during Naval battle of Guadalcanal, 15 November 1942.
- USS Brownson: Sunk by land based aircraft off Cape Gloucester, 26 December 1943.
- USS Blue: Torpedoed and sunk by destroyer Kawakaze, 19 August 1942.
- USS Bush: Sunk by Kamikazes off Okinawa, 6 April 1945.
- USS Callaghan: Sunk by Kamikazes off Okinawa, 28 July 1945.
- USS Cassin: Destroyed by aircraft from carrier Akagi during Attack on Pearl Harbor, 7 December 1941. Parts later recycled.
- USS Chevalier: Scuttled after torpedo hit from destroyer Yūgumo during battle of Vella Lavella, 7 October 1943.
- USS Colhoun: Sunk by Kamikazes off Okinawa, 6 April 1945.
- USS Cooper: Torpedoed and sunk by destroyer escort Take during battle of Ormoc Bay, 3 December 1944.
- USS Cushing: Sunk by gunfire from light cruiser Nagara and destroyers Harusame, Yukikaze, and Teruzuki during the naval battle of Guadalcanal, 13 November 1942.
- USS De Haven: Sunk by land based aircraft during Operation Ke, 1 February 1943.
- USS Drexler: Sank after two hits by kamikaze aircraft on 28 May 1945
- USS Downes: Destroyed by aircraft from carrier Akagi during the attack on Pearl Harbor, 7 December 1941. Parts later recycled.
- USS Duncan: American destroyer sunk on 12 October 1942 by Japanese naval gunfire at the Battle of Cape Esperance.
- USS Edsall: Crippled by carrier aircraft, finished off by battleships Hiei and Kirishima in Indonesian waters, 1 March 1942.
- USS Gwin: Sunk by the destroyers Yukikaze, Hamakaze, Kiyonami, and Yūgure during battle of Kolombangara, 13 July 1943.
- USS Halligan: Sunk after striking a mine, 26 March 1945
- USS Hammann: Sunk on 6 June 1942 by Japanese submarine I-168 during the Battle of Midway.
- USS Henley: Torpedoed and sunk by submarine Ro-108, 3 October 1943.
- USS Hoel: Sunk by battleships Yamato and Nagato and heavy cruiser Haguro during the battle off Samar, 25 October 1944.
- USS Jarvis: Sunk by land based aircraft in the aftermath of the battle of Savo Island, 9 August 1942..
- USS Johnston: Sunk by primarily gunfire from battleship Yamato, light cruiser Yahagi, and destroyers Yukikaze, Isokaze, Urakaze, and Nowaki during the battle off Samar, 25 October 1944.
- USS Laffey: Torpedoed and sunk by destroyer Yukikaze during Naval battle of Guadalcanal, 13 November 1942.
- USS Little: Sunk by Kamikazes, 3 May 1945
- USS Luce: Sunk by Kamikazes, 4 May 1945.
- USS Mahan: Sank after three kamikaze hits off Leyte on 7 December 1944.
- USS Mannert L. Abele: Sunk by Ohka suicide flying bomb during the battle of Okinawa, 12 April 1945.
- USS Meredith: Sunk by planes from aircraft carrier Zuikaku shortly before the battle of Santa Cruz, 16 October 1942.
- USS Monssen: Sunk by battleship Hiei and destroyers Asagumo, Murasame, and Samidare during Battle of Guadalcanal, 13 November 1942.
- USS Morrison: Sank after four hits by kamikaze aircraft on 4 May 1945 while on picket duty off Okinawa.
- USS O'Brien Broke up under tow to Pearl harbor for repairs a month after being torpedoed by Japanese submarine I-19.
- USS Peary: American destroyer sunk on 19 February 1942 by aircraft in Darwin Harbour.
- USS Pillsbury Sunk by heavy cruisers Takao and Atago on 2 March 1942
- USS Pope Crippled by aircraft carrier Ryūjō, finished off by heavy cruisers Myōkō and Ashigara, 1 March 1942
- USS Porter Sunk by downed US torpedo bomber shot down by fighters from light carrier Zuihō, Battle of the Santa Cruz Islands 26 October 1942.
- USS Preston: Sunk by gunfire from light cruiser Nagara and torpedo from destroyer Ayanami during the naval battle of Guadalcanal, 15 November 1942.
- USS Pringle: Sunk by Kamikaze attacks off Okinawa, 16 April 1945.
- USS Sims: Sunk on 7 May 1942 by aircraft carriers Shōkaku and Zuikaku during Battle of Coral Sea.
- USS Stewart: Scuttled in harbor on account of gunfire damage from the destroyers Asashio and Ōshio during the battle of the Badung Strait, 19 February 1942. Wreck later raised by Imperial Japanese Navy and recommissioned as Patrol boat no 102.
- USS Strong: Torpedoed and sunk by destroyer Niizuki shortly before battle of Kula Gulf, 5 July 1943.
- USS Twiggs: Sunk by Kamikazes, 16 June 1945.
- USS Reid: Sank after two kamikaze hits off Leyte on 11 December 1944.
- USS Walke: Torpedoed and sunk by destroyer Samidare during naval battle of Guadalcanal, 15 November 1942.
- USS William D. Porter. Sunk by near miss from Kamikaze, 19 June 1945.

=== Destroyer Escorts ===
- USS Eversole: Torpedoed and sunk by submarine I-45, 28 October 1944.
- USS Oberrender: Damaged beyond repair by Kamikaze attack, 9 May 1945.
- USS Samuel B. Roberts: Sunk by battleship Kongō during the battle off Samar, 25 October 1942.
- USS Shelton: Torpedoed and sunk by submarine Ro-41, 3 October 1944.
- USS Underhill Torpedoed and sunk 24 July 1945 by submarine I-53.

=== Submarines ===
- USS Albacore Sunk 7 November 1944 by Japanese mines.
- USS Amberjack Sunk 16 February 1943 by torpedo boat Hiyodori and sub-chaser CH-18 and a 958th Kōkūtai E13A1 Jake.
- USS Argonaut Sunk 10 January 1943 by destroyers Maikaze and Isokaze.
- USS Barbel Sunk 4 February 1945 by land-based naval aircraft.
- USS Bonefish Sunk 19 June 1945 by kaibokan Okinawa, CD-63, CD-75, CD-158 and CD-207.
- USS Capelin Possibly sunk November 1943 by minelayer Wakataka and 934th Kōkūtai aircraft or a Japanese mine.
- USS Cisco Sunk 28 September 1943 by gunboat Karatsu – the former USS Luzon, and a 954th Kōkūtai B5N2 Kate.
- USS Corvina The only confirmed instance of a US submarine being sunk by a Japanese submarine, sunk by Japanese submarine I-176.
- USS Escolar Sunk 17 October 1944 by a Japanese mine.
- USS Flier Sunk 13 August 1944 by Japanese mines.
- USS Grampus Sunk 5 March 1943 by destroyers Minegumo and Murasame or by 958th Kōkūtai naval aircraft.
- USS Grayback Sunk 27 February 1944 by land-based B5N2 Kates from Okinawa.
- USS Grayling Sunk 9 September 1943 by ramming from transport Hokuan Maru.
- USS Grenadier Sunk 22 April 1943 by 936th Kōkūtai seaplanes.
- USS Growler Sunk 8 November 1944 by destroyer Shigure, and kaibokan Chiburi and CD-19.
- USS Golet Sunk 14 June 1944 by gunboat Miya Maru and auxiliary sub-chaser Bunzan Maru.
- USS Gudgeon Sunk 18 April 1944 by 901st Kōkūtai naval aircraft.
- USS Harder Sunk 24 August 1944 by kaibokan CD-22.
- USS Kete Sunk 20 March 1945 by Japanese mines.
- USS Lagarto Sunk 3 May 1945 by minelayer Hatsutaka.
- USS Perch Sunk 1-3 March 1942 by destroyers Amatsukaze, Hatsukaze, Ushio, and Sazanami.
- USS Pickerel Sunk 3 April 1943 by minelayer Shirakami and auxiliary sub-chaser Bunzan Maru.
- USS Pompano Sunk August or September 1943 by either surface and air attack or Japanese mines.
- USS Runner Sunk June 1943 by either a Japanese mine or combined surface and air attack.
- USS S-44 Sunk 7 October 1943 by escort Ishigaki.
- USS Sealion: Damaged by bombing on 10 December 1941 at Cavite, Luzon, later scuttled.
- USS Scamp Sunk 11 November 1944 by kaibokan CD-4 with naval aircraft.
- USS Sculpin Sunk 19 November 1943 by destroyer Yamagumo.
- USS Scorpion Possibly sunk January 1944 by Japanese mine.
- USS Shark Sunk 11 February 1942 by destroyer Yamakaze.
- USS Shark Sunk 24 October 1944 by destroyer Harukaze.
- USS Snook Sunk 9 April 1945 by kaibokan Okinawa, CD-8, CD-32, and CD-52 with a 951st Kōkūtai E13A1 Jake and Q1W1 Lorna.
- USS Swordfish Possibly sunk 4 January 1945 by Kaibokan CD-4 or a mine.
- USS Trigger Sunk 28 March 1945 by kaibokan Mikura, CD-33 and CD-59.
- USS Triton Sunk 15 March 1943 by destroyers Samidare and Satsuki and sub-chasers CH-22 and CH-24.
- USS Trout Sunk 8 February 1944 by destroyer Asashimo.
- USS Wahoo Sunk 11 October 1943 by sub-chasers CH-15, CH-43 and 3 E13A1 Jakes.

=== Amphibious Warfare Ships ===
- USS LCI(G)-82 4 April 45 Shinyo (suicide motorboat) off Okinawa, Ryukyu Islands
- USS LCI(G)-365 10 January 45 Shinyo (suicide motorboat) in Lingayen Gulf, Luzon, Philippine Islands
- USS LCI(M)-974 10 January 45 Shinyo (suicide motorboat) in Lingayen Gulf, Luzon, Philippine Islands
- USS LCS(L)-7 16 January 45 Shinyo (suicide motorboat) off Mariveles, Corregidor Channel, Luzon, Philippine Islands
- USS LCS(L)-15 22 April 45 Kamikaze aircraft off Okinawa, Ryukyu Islands
- USS LCS(L)-26 14 February 45 Kamikaze aircraft off Okinawa, Ryukyu
- USS LCS(L)-33 12 April 45 Kamikaze aircraft off Okinawa, Ryukyu Islands
- USS LCS(L)(3)-49 16 February 45 Shinyo (suicide motorboat) off Mariveles, Corregidor Channel, Luzon, Philippine Islands
- USS LSM-12 4 April 45 foundered after being damaged by a Shinyo (suicide motorboat) off Okinawa, Ryukyu Islands
- USS LSM-20 5 December 44 Kamikaze aircraft off Ormoc, Leyte, Philippine Islands
- USS LSM-59 21 June 45 Kamikaze aircraft off Okinawa, Ryukyu Islands
- USS LSM-135 25 May 45 Kamikaze aircraft off Okinawa, Ryukyu Islands
- USS LSM(R)-190 4 May 45 Kamikaze aircraft off Okinawa, Ryukyu Islands
- USS LSM(R)-194 4 May 45 Kamikaze aircraft off Okinawa, Ryukyu Islands
- USS LSM(R)-195 3 May 45 Kamikaze aircraft off Okinawa, Ryukyu Islands
- USS LSM-318 7 December 44 Kamikaze aircraft off Ormoc, Leyte, Philippine Islands
- USS LST-460 21 December 44 Kamikaze aircraft off Mindoro, Philippine Islands
- USS LST-447 7 April 45 Kamikaze aircraft off Okinawa, Ryukyu Islands
- USS LST-472 15 December 44 Kamikaze aircraft off Mindoro, Philippine Islands
- USS LST-738 15 December 44 Kamikaze aircraft off Mindoro, Philippine Islands
- USS LST-749 21 December 44 Kamikaze aircraft off Mindoro, Philippine Islands

=== Mine Warfare Craft ===
- USS Bittern: Sunk by bombing at Cavite, Luzon on 10 December 1941.
- USS Emmons Scuttled after Kamikaze hits, 7 April 1945.
- USS Finch Sunk by Japanese aircraft, 10 April 1942, later salvaged by Japanese forces.
- USS Gamble Scuttled after bomb hits from Japanese aircraft, 16 July 1945.
- USS Hovey Sunk by Japanese aircraft, 7 January 1945.
- USS Long Sunk by Kamikazes, 6 January 1945
- USS Montgomery Damaged beyond repair after hitting a mine, 17 October 1944.
- USS Oglala: Sunk 7 December 1941 during the Pearl Harbor attack by torpedo bombers from aircraft carrier Sōryū. Later raised and converted to engine repair ship.
- USS Palmer Sunk by Japanese aircraft, 7 January 1945.
- USS Penguin: Scuttled after strafing damage at Guam on 8 December 1941.
- USS Perry Sunk after hitting a mine, 13 September 1944.
- USS Quail Scuttled to prevent capture, 5 May 1942.
- USS Skylark Sunk after hitting a mine, 28 March 1945.
- USS Swallow Sunk by Kamikaze attacks, 22 April 1945.
- USS Salute Sunk after hitting a mine, 8 June 1945.
- USS Tanager Sunk by Bataan shore fire, 4 May 1942.

=== Oilers ===
- USS Kanawha sunk on 8 April 1943 by Japanese aircraft off Tulagi, Solomon Islands.
- USS Mississinewa sunk 20 November 1944, first to be hit by a Japanese Kaiten manned torpedo from submarine I-47.
- USS Neches sunk 28 January 1942 by torpedo from Japanese submarine I-72
- USS Neosho sunk on 7 May 1942 by carrier aircraft during Battle of Coral Sea.
- USS Pecos sunk on 1 March 1942 by Japanese air attack from aircraft carrier Soryu

=== Transports ===
- USS Aludra Torpedoed and sunk by submarine Ro-103, 23 June 1943.
- USS Deimos Torpedoed and sunk by submarine Ro-103, 23 June 1943
- USS George F. Elliott Sunk by land-based aircraft, 8 August 1942.
- USS Gregory: Sunk by gunfire from destroyers Yūdachi, Hatsuyuki, and Murakumo, 5 September 1942
- USS Little: Sunk by gunfire from destroyers Yūdachi, Hatsuyuki, and Mirakumo, 5 September 1942.

=== Motor Torpedo Boats ===
- USS PT-34 Sunk by Japanese aircraft, 9 April 1942.
- USS PT-35 Scuttled to prevent capture, 12 April 1942.
- USS PT-37 Sunk by destroyer Kawakaze during Operation Ke, 1 February 1943.
- USS PT-41 Scuttled to prevent capture, 14 April 1942.
- USS PT-43 Sunk by destroyers Hatsukaze and Tokitsukaze, 11 January 1943.
- USS PT-44 Sunk by destroyers Kawakaze and Suzukaze, 12 December 1942.
- USS PT-109 Rammed by IJN destroyer Amagiri in Guadalcanal waters. Future US president John F. Kennedy survived the sinking.
- USS PT-111 Sunk by destroyer Kawakaze during Operation Ke, 1 February 1943.
- USS PT-112 Sunk by destroyers Hatsukaze and Tokitsukaze, 11 January 1943.
- USS PT-117 Sunk by Japanese aircraft, 1 August 1943.
- USS PT-133 Sunk by Japanese shore batteries, 15 July 1944.
- USS PT-164 Sunk by Japanese aircraft, 1 August 1943.
- USS PT-247 Sunk by Japanese shore batteries, 5 May 1944.
- USS PT-251 Sunk by Japanese shore batteries, 26 February 1944.
- USS PT-300 Sunk by a Kamikaze, 18 December 1944.
- USS PT-320 Sunk by Japanese aircraft, 5 November 1944.
- USS PT-323 Sunk by a Kamikaze, 10 December 1944.
- USS PT-363 Sunk by Japanese shore batteries, 25 November 1944
- USS PT-493 Sunk by battleship Yamashiro during the battle of the Surigao Strait, 25 October 1944.

=== Other ===
- USS Asheville (PG-21): Gunboat sunk by destroyers Nowaki and Arashi, 3 March 1942
- SS John Burke: ammunition ship sunk on 28 December 1944 by kamikaze.
- USS Langley (AV-3) (ex CV-1): Seaplane tender sunk on 27 February 1942 by land-based aircraft after departing Tjilatjap in the Dutch East Indies
- USAT Liberty: Army transport sunk on 11 January 1942 by I-166 near Lombok Strait.
- USS Luzon (PR-7): Gunboat scuttled 5 May 1942 raised by Japanese-sunk while in Japanese service
- USAT Meigs: Army transport sunk on 19 February 1942 by aircraft in Darwin Harbour.
- USS Mindanao (PR-8) Gunboat scuttled to avoid capture 2 May 1942
- USS Oahu (PR-6): Gunboat sunk in action 5 May 1942
- USS Panay (PR-5): Gunboat sunk in action 12 December 1937
- USS Utah (AG-16) (ex BB-31): Former battleship, sunk 7 December 1941 by carrier-based aircraft during the attack on Pearl Harbor.
- USS Wake (PR-3): Gunboat captured 8 December 1941

== Imperial Russia ==
=== Auxiliary cruisers ===
- Angara, 30 October 1904
- Ural, 27 May 1905

=== Battleships ===
- Borodino, sunk by 12-inch (305 mm) shell from battleship Fuji which detonated her magazines, battle of Tsushima, 27 May 1905
- Imperator Aleksandr III, sunk by gunfire from battleships Mikasa, Asahi, Shikashima, and Fuji, battle of Tsushima, 27 May 1905
- Knyaz Suvorov, sunk by gunfire from battleships Mikasa and Asahi, then destroyer torpedoes, battle of Tsushima, 27 May 1905
- Navarin, 28 May 1905
- Oslyabya, sunk by gunfire from battleships Mikasa and Shikashima; first battleship sunk by gunfire, battle of Tsushima, 27 May 1905
- Petropavlovsk, fired on by Japanese battleline and lured into a minefield, magazines detonated and sank in 2 minutes, 13 April 1904
- Sevastopol, 2 January 1905
- Sissoi Veliky, 28 May 1905

=== Coastal defense ships ===
- Admiral Ushakov, sunk by armored cruisers Iwate and Yakumo, battle of Tsushima, 28 May 1905

=== Cruisers ===
- Admiral Nakhimov, 28 May 1905
- Boyarin, 12 February 1904
- Dmitrii Donskoi, 28 May 1905
- Izumrud, 29 May 1905
- Rurik, 14 August 1904
- Svetlana, 28 May 1905
- Vladimir Monomakh, 28 May 1905

=== Gunboats ===
- Bobr, 26 December 1904
- Gremyashchi, 18 August 1904
- Koietz, 9 February 1904
- Otvajni, 2 January 1905
- Sivuch, 2 August 1904
- Zabiyaka, 25 October 1904

=== Minelayers ===
- Amur, 18 December 1904
- Yenisei, 11 February 1904

=== Repair ships ===
- Kamchatka, 27 May 1905

=== Sloops ===
- Djigit, 2 January 1905
- Razboinik, 2 January 1905

=== Torpedo Boat Destroyers ===
- Bditelni, 2 January 1905
- Bezuprechni, 28 May 1905
- Blestyashtchi, 28 May 1905
- Boevoi, 2 January 1905
- Buinyi, 28 May 1905
- Buistri, 28 May 1905
- Burni, 11 August 1904
- Gromki, 28 May 1905
- Leitenant Burakov, 24 July 1904
- Rastoropni, 16 November 1904
- Razyashchi, 2 January 1905
- Ryeshitelni, 11 August 1904
- Silni, 2 January 1905
- Strashni, 13 April 1904
- Steregushchi, 19 March 1904
- Stroini, 13 November 1904
- Storozhevoi, 2 January 1905
- Vnimatelni, 26 May 1904
- Vuinoslivi, 24 August 1904
- Vnushitelni, 25 February 1904

=== Torpedo boats ===
- Tantchikhe, 21 August 1904
- #202, 1 October 1904
- Ussuri, 30 June 1904
- #208, 13 July 1904

=== Torpedo gunboats ===
- Guidamak, 2 January 1905
- Vsadnik, 15 December 1904

== Readings ==
- Masataka Chiyaka; Yasuo Abe (1972). Warship Profile 22; IJN Yukikaze/Destroyer/1939-1970. Profile Publications Ltd.
