= USS Skylark (AM-63) =

Minesweeper of the United States Navy

Coordinates: 26°20′N 127°40′E

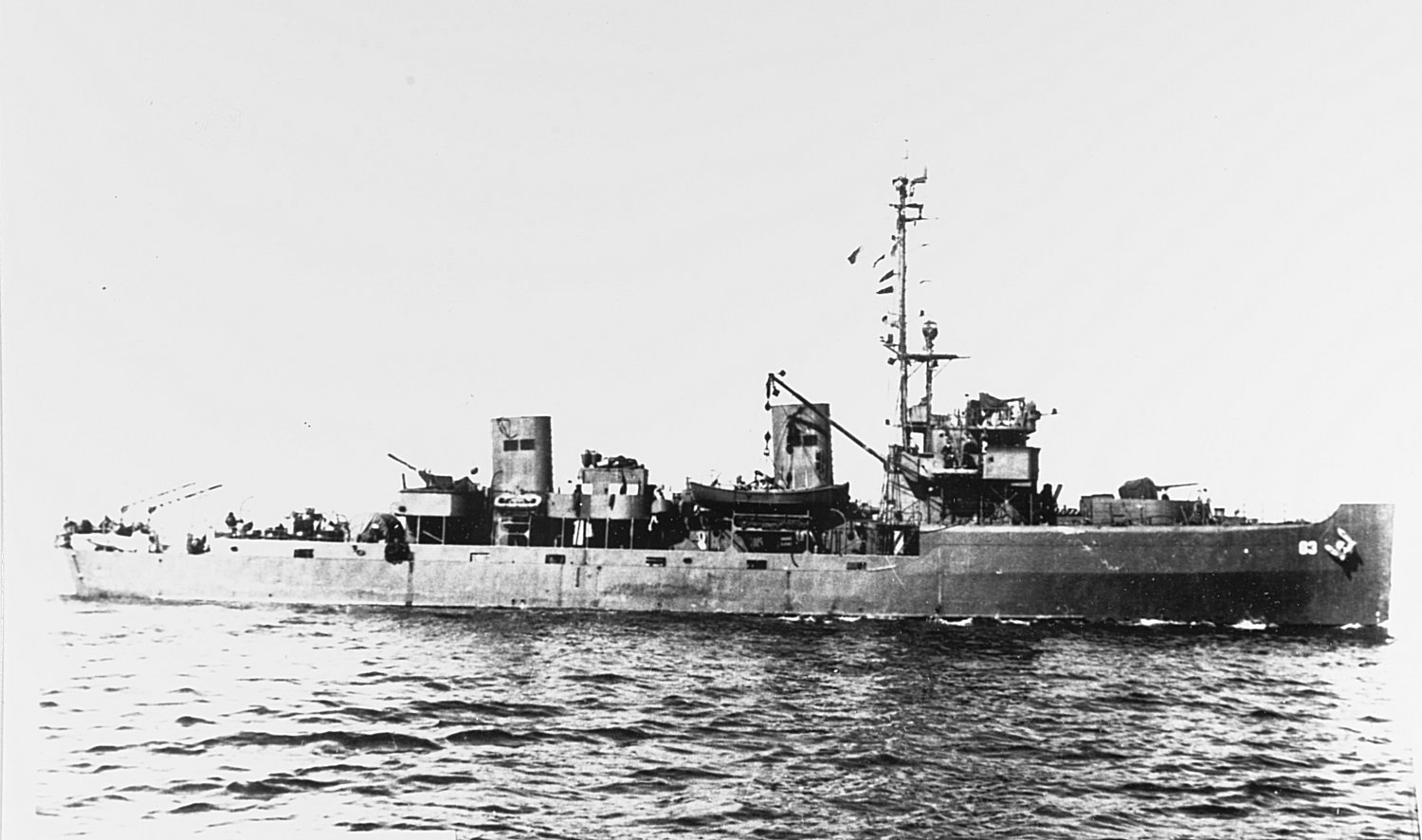

History

United States
- Name: USS Skylark
- Namesake: skylark
- Builder: General Engineering & Dry Dock Company, Alameda, California
- Laid down: 9 July 1941
- Launched: 12 March 1942
- Commissioned: 25 November 1942
- Stricken: 28 April 1945
- Identification: AM-63
- Honours and awards: 3 battle stars (World War II)
- Fate: Sunk by a mine off Okinawa, 28 March 1945

General characteristics
- Class & type: Auk-class minesweeper
- Displacement: 890 long tons (904 t)
- Length: 220 ft 6 in (67.21 m)
- Beam: 32 ft 2 in (9.80 m)
- Draft: 10 ft 9 in (3.28 m)
- Speed: 18.1 knots (33.5 km/h; 20.8 mph)
- Complement: 105 officers and enlisted
- Armament: 1 × 3"/50 caliber gun; 2 × 40 mm guns; 2 × Depth charge tracks

USS Skylark (AM-63) was an Auk-class minesweeper built for the United States Navy during World War II. She earned three battle stars during World War II. Skylark was mined and sunk off Okinawa in April 1945. She was struck from the Naval Vessel Register the same day.

== Career ==
Skylark was laid down on 9 July 1941 by the General Engineering & Dry Dock Company of Alameda, California; launched on 12 March 1942; sponsored by Mrs. William L. Simpson; and commissioned on 25 November 1942.

After almost a month of trials, calibrations, and training along the coast of California, Skylark got underway for Pearl Harbor, Hawaii, on the morning of 20 December. The convoy arrived in Pearl Harbor ten days later, and Skylark remained in the Islands for another eleven days. On 10 January 1943, she stood out of Pearl Harbor and set course for Espiritu Santo in the New Hebrides, escorting another convoy. For the next year, Skylark escorted convoys around the various island groups in the South Pacific, the New Hebrides, Samoa, New Caledonia, and the Solomons, the conquest of which she was supporting. Often she shepherded supply echelons to Guadalcanal and to some of the other islands in the group, then would patrol the area for a week or two.

=== Guadalcanal ===
Of all the months of that year, June 1943 was her most active. On the 16th, while she was screening ships off Guadalcanal, she came under aerial attack by Japanese dive bombers and assisted in splashing four of the intruders. A week later, on 23 June, two ships of her convoy, Aludra and Deimos were torpedoed by a Japanese submarine, Ro-103. Skylark succeeded in rescuing 193 survivors and carried them on to Espiritu Santo.

=== Solomons ===
In January 1944, the minesweeper began an extended period of convoy-escort and patrol duty in the Solomons. Until 15 April, her theater of operations was restricted to those islands alone as she herded the supply echelons between them. On 15 April, she departed the Solomons for Espiritu Santo, arriving there the next day. On 7 May, she began her return voyage to the Solomons; and, two days later, she put into Purvis Bay, Florida Island, for repairs. Repairs and minesweeping exercises occupied her time until 3 June, when she sailed from Purvis Bay with elements of Task Force 53, bound for Kwajalein Atoll in the Marshalls. The various elements of the task force rendezvoused at Kwajalein on the 8th, refueled, and departed on the 12th.

=== Marianas and Marshall Islands ===
The Southern Attack Force, otherwise known as task force TF 53, was assigned the job of retaking Guam during the Marianas operation. Originally, the Guam assault was to have come several days after that upon Saipan. However, the necessity of meeting and defeating the Japanese fleet in what was to be the Battle of the Philippine Sea and the determination that additional troops would be needed to conquer Guam caused the assault to be delayed. Thus, TF 53 steamed around in the ocean 150 to 300 miles (240 to 480 km) east of Saipan until 25 June when Admiral Spruance ordered the bulk of it to Eniwetok to await the lifting of additional forces from Hawaii. Skylark arrived in Eniwetok Lagoon three days later.

She remained at Eniwetok until 17 July at which time the task force departed for Guam. Arriving off Apra Harbor on 21 July, Skylark took up her screening station and, for almost two months, screened ships and patrolled in the vicinity of Apra. On 9 September, Skylark ceased patrolling and screening and departed Guam in the escort of an Eniwetok-bound convoy. She arrived on 14 September and entered an availability period until 3 October. From Eniwetok, she moved to Ulithi, arriving on 9 October and departing again on 17 September to escort the repair ship Oahu back to Eniwetok. The two ships made Eniwetok on 23 October, and Skylark departed the next day. After a two-day layover at Majuro, 26 to 28 October, she headed for Pearl Harbor. From Pearl Harbor, she continued on to California, where she underwent repairs at both the Stockton Ship Works at Stockton, California, and General Engineering & Dry Dock Co., at Alameda, California.

=== Okinawa ===
On 15 February 1945, Skylark pointed her bow westward again and sailed out of Alameda. She entered Pearl Harbor on 22 February, provisioned the next day, and headed back to Eniwetok on 24 February. A month later, Skylark was with the other minesweepers clearing the invasion areas around Okinawa.

==== Mine damage ====
At 10:55 on 28 March, while sweeping a minefield off the Hagushi beaches, she struck a mine on her port side amidships. Skylark drifted while the crew fought fires and tried to save her. Twenty minutes later, she struck a second mine, took a heavy list, and sank within fifteen minutes. Five men were killed by the two explosions and, thanks to the rescue work of the destroyer minelayer Tolman, these were her only losses.

Skylark was struck from the Navy list on 28 April 1945. Skylark earned three battle stars for World War II service.
