= Balalae Island mass graves =

1943 massacre of POWs by Japan

- Part of World War II
- Location: Balalae Island
- Date: 31 June 1943
- Target: British POWs
- Attack type: Massacre, forced labor, Mass grave, Human shield
- Deaths: 527
- Perpetrators: Imperial Japanese Navy; Imperial Japanese Army

The Balalae Island mass graves were the graves of over 400 British prisoners of war, who during World War II were worked to death by the Imperial Japanese Navy, blown up as human shields during Allied Air raids, and ultimately massacred by the Imperial Japanese Army. The mass graves were discovered by Australian investigators after the end of the war.

== Background ==
In October 1942, 600 British Artillerymen taken as prisoners of war after the fall of Singapore, along with their commander Lieutenant Colonel John Bassett, were loaded onto a ship and were told that they were being transported to a prison camp in Japan before actually being sent south to Rabaul. 517 or 527 of the fittest men were subsequently shipped from Rabaul to Balalae, arriving in late November 1942. The prisoners were assigned to the Imperial Japanese Navy's 18th Construction Unit led by Lieutenant Commander Osaki Toshihiko (尾崎憲彦) and put to work on constructing a new airfield.

== Forced labour ==
The prisoners were forced to build a runway for the Japanese that is still in use today. Approximately 100 of the prisoners died from overworking, exhaustion and tropical diseases. The Japanese also used the prisoner's camp as a human shield against air raids; 300 prisoners were killed by an allied air raid on the island. According to Lt. Commander Osaki, the first of the dead prisoners were initially buried at sea, but later the rest were buried on the island.

== Massacre ==
Kaneshiro Fukukan, a Korean worker with the 18th Construction Unit on the Island, recalled in an interrogation that on the evening of June 30 the island was shelled by the Allies and the Japanese became afraid of an impeding Allied landing. The following day on June 31, the Japanese carried out a mass execution of all remaining POWs with bayonets and swords. Kaneshiro was unaware of the unit tasked with carrying out the killings, but had heard rumors that Osaki had beheaded a POW with a sword on the night of the shelling or the following day. Amongst the prisoners killed was the English cricketer Norman Bowell.

In his statement made while detained at Sugamo Prison, the Construction Unit's Commander Osaki offered a different timeline, stating the Allied shelling and subsequent massacre occurred towards the end of March or beginning of April 1943. Osaki put the number of remaining POWs massacred at around 90 men and stated the killings were carried out by an Army company responsible for management of the prisoners.

== Discovery of the mass graves ==
The mass graves were discovered after the war by Australian investigators in November 1945. They exhumed the remains of over 400 bodies from the mass graves. They also found two sets of broken rosary beads, both of which were missing their crucifixes. Japanese authorities denied the war crime and claimed that the prisoners were lost at sea when their transport was torpedoed.

In his report on the war crimes, Australian Army Major E C Milliken concluded the only person who could be held responsible was chief of the Construction Unit Lt. Commander Osaki. While Osaki as well as Lt. Commander Miyake Isamu (三宅勇)—the last officer in charge of Balalae—were both detained for questioning at Sugamo Prison, the two were ultimately released without charges.
