= Japanese submarine Ro-102 =

Imperial Navy Ro-100-class submarine

History

Japan
- Name: Submarine No. 212
- Builder: Kawasaki, Kobe, Japan
- Laid down: 30 September 1941
- Renamed: Ro-102
- Launched: 17 April 1942
- Completed: 17 November 1942
- Commissioned: 17 November 1942
- Fate: Missing after 9 May 1943
- Stricken: 15 July 1943

Service record
- Part of: Kure Submarine Squadron; Submarine Squadron 7
- Commanders: Kanemoto Shoji; 17 November 1942 – May 1943

General characteristics
- Class & type: Ro-100-class submarine
- Displacement: 611 tonnes (601 long tons) surfaced; 795 tonnes (782 long tons) submerged
- Length: 60.90 m (199 ft 10 in) overall
- Beam: 6.00 m (19 ft 8 in)
- Draft: 3.51 m (11 ft 6 in)
- Installed power: 1,000 bhp (750 kW) (diesel); 760 hp (570 kW) (electric motor)
- Propulsion: Diesel-electric; 1 × diesel engine; 1 × electric motor
- Speed: 14.2 knots (26.3 km/h; 16.3 mph) surfaced; 8 knots (15 km/h; 9.2 mph) submerged
- Range: 3,500 nmi (6,500 km; 4,000 mi) at 12 knots (22 km/h; 14 mph) surfaced; 60 nmi (110 km; 69 mi) at 3 knots (5.6 km/h; 3.5 mph) submerged
- Test depth: 75 m (246 ft)
- Crew: 38
- Armament: 4 × bow 533 mm (21 in) torpedo tubes; 2 × 25 mm (1 in) Type 96 anti-aircraft guns or 1 × 76.2 mm (3.00 in) L/40 AA gun

Ro-102 was an Imperial Japanese Navy Ro-100-class submarine. Completed and commissioned in November 1942, she served in World War II, operating in the Solomon Islands, Rabaul, and New Guinea areas. She disappeared in May 1943 during her third war patrol.

== Design and description ==
The Ro-100 class was a medium-sized, coastal submarine derived from the preceding Kaichū type. They displaced 611 tonnes (601 long tons) surfaced and 795 tonnes (782 long tons) submerged. The submarines were 60.9 meters (199 ft 10 in) long, had a beam of 6 meters (19 ft 8 in) and a draft of 3.51 meters (11 ft 6 in). They had a double hull and a diving depth of 75 meters (246 ft).

For surface running, the boats were powered by two 500-brake-horsepower (373 kW) diesel engines, each driving one propeller shaft. When submerged each propeller was driven by a 380-horsepower (283 kW) electric motor. They could reach 14.2 knots (26.3 km/h; 16.3 mph) on the surface and 8 knots (15 km/h; 9.2 mph) underwater. On the surface, the Ro-100s had a range of 3,500 nautical miles (6,500 km; 4,000 mi) at 12 knots (22 km/h; 14 mph); submerged, they had a range of 60 nmi (110 km; 69 mi) at 3 knots (5.6 km/h; 3.5 mph).

The boats were armed with four internal bow 53.3 cm (21.0 in) torpedo tubes and carried a total of eight torpedoes. They were also armed with two single mounts for 25 mm (1 in) Type 96 anti-aircraft guns or a single 76.2 mm (3.00 in) L/40 AA gun.

== Construction and commissioning ==
Ro-102 was laid down as Submarine No. 212 on 30 September 1941 by Kawasaki at Kobe, Japan. She had been renamed Ro-102 by the time she was launched on 17 April 1942. She was completed and commissioned on 17 November 1942, under the command of Lieutenant Commander Kanemoto Shoji.

== Service history ==
Upon commissioning, Ro-102 was attached to the Yokosuka Naval District and was assigned to the Kure Submarine Squadron for workups. On 16 January 1943, she was reassigned to Submarine Squadron 7 in the 8th Fleet. She departed Yokosuka, Japan, on 25 January 1943, called at Truk from 8 to 11 February 1943, and arrived at Rabaul on New Britain on 15 February 1943.

=== First war patrol ===
Ro-102 got underway from Rabaul on 22 February 1943 for her first war patrol, assigned a patrol area south of New Guinea. The patrol was uneventful, and she returned to Rabaul on 15 March 1943.

=== Second war patrol ===
After the Combined Fleet initiated Operation I-Go — a reinforcement of the 11th Air Fleet base at Rabaul by planes from the aircraft carriers Zuikaku and Zuihō and of the Japanese naval air base on Balalae Island in the Shortland Islands by planes from the aircraft carriers Hiyō and Jun'yō. — Ro-102 departed Rabaul on 30 March 1943 in company with the submarine Ro-103 to support the operation by patrolling southeast of Guadalcanal. The patrol passed quietly, and she returned to Rabaul on 12 April 1943.

=== Third war patrol ===
On 29 April 1943, Ro-102 departed Rabaul to begin her third war patrol, bound for a patrol area southeast of Rabi, New Guinea, which she reached on 2 May 1943. She transmitted a message on 9 May 1943 from a position south of New Guinea reporting a lack of enemy activity in the area. The Japanese never heard from her again. On 15 May 1943, Ro-102 was ordered to return to Rabaul, but she did not acknowledge receipt of the order.

=== Loss ===
The circumstances of Ro-102′s loss remain a mystery. Some historians claim that the United States Navy destroyer USS Fletcher sank her off San Cristobal in the southeastern Solomon Islands on 11 February 1943, but Ro-102 was active after that date, and the submarine Fletcher sank was later determined to be I-18. Other historians credit the U.S. Navy PT boats PT-150 and PT-152 with sinking Ro-102 off Lae, New Guinea, on the night of 13–14 May 1943, but the PT boats actually attacked the submarine I-6 that night, and I-6 survived.

On 2 June 1943, the Imperial Japanese Navy declared Ro-102 to be presumed lost south of Rabi with all 42 men on board. The Japanese struck her from the Navy list on 15 July 1943.
