= Crater-class cargo ship =

World War II U.S. Navy cargo ship class

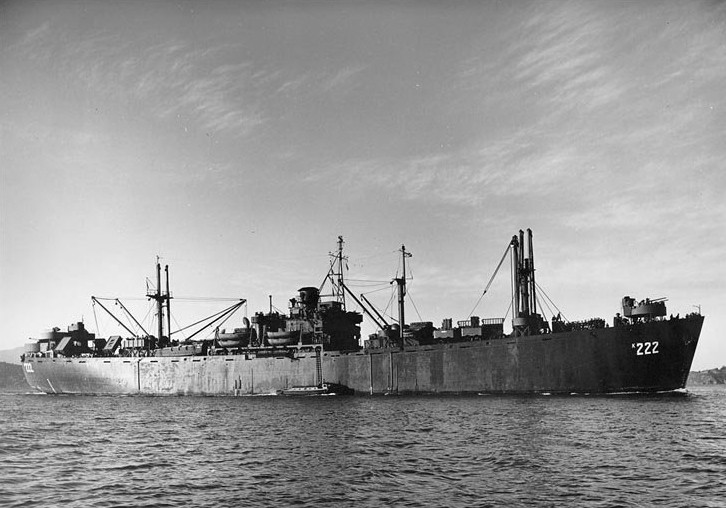
- USS Livingston (AK-222)

Class overview
- Operators: United States Navy
- Built: 1942–1944
- In commission: 1942–1948
- Completed: 65

General characteristics
- Type: Cargo ship
- Displacement: 4,023 long tons (4,088 t) (standard); 14,550 long tons (14,780 t) (full load)
- Length: 441 ft 6 in (134.57 m)
- Beam: 56 ft 11 in (17.35 m)
- Draft: 28 ft 4 in (8.64 m)
- Installed power: 2 × Oil fired 450 °F (232 °C) boilers, operating at 220 psi (1,500 kPa) , 2,500 shp (1,900 kW)
- Propulsion: 1 × Vertical triple-expansion reciprocating steam engine, 1 × screw propeller
- Speed: 12.5 kn (23.2 km/h; 14.4 mph)
- Capacity: 7,800 t (7,700 long tons) DWT; 444,206 cu ft (12,578.5 m^{3}) (non-refrigerated)
- Complement: 206
- Armament: 1 × 5-inch (127 mm)/50 caliber gun; 1 × 3-inch (76 mm)/50 caliber gun; 2 × 40 mm (1.57 in) Bofors guns; 6 × 20 mm (0.79 in) Oerlikon cannons; or; 1 × 5-inch/38-caliber gun; 4 × 40 mm guns; 12 × 20 mm guns

The Crater-class cargo ship were converted EC2-S-C1 type, Liberty cargo ships, constructed by the United States Maritime Commission (USMC) for use by the US Navy during World War II. The designation 'EC2-S-C1': 'EC' for Emergency Cargo, '2' for a ship between 400 and 450 ft (120 and 140 m) long (Load Waterline Length), 'S' for steam engines, and 'C1' for design C1.

The class was named for the lead ship of its type, USS Crater (AK-70), with most ships in the class being named for astronomical bodies. Its 65 hulls were among the largest US Navy cargo ship classes.

The ships were propelled by a reciprocating steam engine using a single screw with a power of 2,500 hp (1,864 kW) shaft.

== Notable incidents ==
- USS Aludra (AK-72) Lost in action from Japanese torpedo on 23 June 1943 south of Makira island.
- USS Deimos (AK-78) Damaged by torpedo, 23 June 1943, then abandoned and scuttled south of Makira island.
- USS Serpens (AK-97) Destroyed by an internal explosion while at anchor off Guadalcanal on 29 January 1945.
