= USS Crater =

Cargo ship of the United States Navy

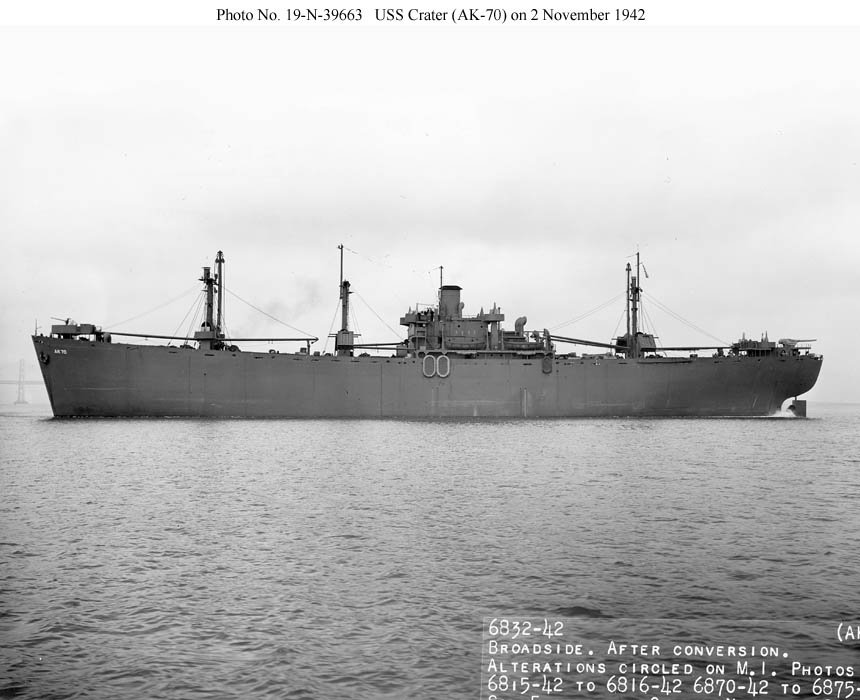
- USS Crater (AK-70) underway in San Francisco Bay, 2 November 1942, soon after conversion for naval service.

History

United States
- Name: John James Audubon
- Namesake: John James Audubon
- Owner: War Shipping Administration (WSA)
- Operator: A.H. Bull & Co., Inc.
- Ordered: as a Type EC2-S-C1 hull, MCE hull 420
- Builder: Richmond Shipyards, Richmond, California
- Cost: $1,181,541
- Yard number: 420
- Way number: 1
- Laid down: 28 August 1942
- Launched: 8 October 1942
- Sponsored by: Mrs. Mary Elizabeth Cornelison Wetsel
- Identification: IMO number: 5173890; Call sign: KHUJ
- Fate: Transferred to US Navy, 22 October 1942

United States
- Name: Crater
- Namesake: The constellation Crater
- Acquired: 22 October 1942
- Commissioned: 31 October 1942
- Decommissioned: 25 June 1946
- Stricken: 23 June 1947
- Identification: Hull symbol: AK-70; Call sign: NXTX
- Fate: Sold for scrapping, 26 August 1974, removed from fleet, 7 October 1974
- Notes: Name reverted to John James Audubon when laid up in Reserve Fleet

General characteristics
- Class & type: Crater-class cargo ship
- Type: Type EC2-S-C1
- Displacement: 4,023 long tons (4,088 t) (standard); 14,550 long tons (14,780 t) (full load)
- Length: 441 ft 6 in (134.57 m)
- Beam: 56 ft 11 in (17.35 m)
- Draft: 28 ft 4 in (8.64 m)
- Installed power: 2 × Oil fired 450 °F (232 °C) boilers, operating at 220 psi (1,500 kPa) , (manufactured by Babcock & Wilcox); 2,500 shp (1,900 kW)
- Propulsion: 1 × Vertical triple-expansion reciprocating steam engine, (manufactured by Joshua Hendy); 1 × screw propeller
- Speed: 12.5 kn (23.2 km/h; 14.4 mph)
- Capacity: 7,800 t (7,700 long tons) DWT; 444,206 cu ft (12,578.5 m^{3}) (non-refrigerated)
- Complement: 205
- Armament: 1 × 5 in (127 mm)/38 caliber dual-purpose (DP) gun; 1 × 3 in (76 mm)/50 caliber DP gun; 2 × 40 mm (1.57 in) Bofors anti-aircraft (AA) gun mounts; 6 × 20 mm (0.79 in) Oerlikon cannon AA gun mounts

USS Crater (AK-70) was the lead ship of her class of converted liberty ship cargo ships in the service of the US Navy in World War II. She was first named after John James Audubon, an American ornithologist, naturalist, and painter. She was renamed and commissioned after the constellation Crater, she was the only ship of the Navy to bear this name.

== Construction ==
John James Audubon was laid down 28 August 1942, under a Maritime Commission (MARCOM) contract, MC hull 420, by Permanente Metals Corporation's, Yard No. 2, Richmond, California. She was launched 8 October 1942, sponsored by Mrs. Mary Elisabeth Cornelison Wetsel, the wife of Captain George Wetsel, the public works officer of Mare Island Naval Shipyard. John James Audubon was transferred to the US Navy, 22 October 1942. She was renamed Crater and commissioned 31 October 1942.

== Service history ==
Clearing San Francisco 10 November 1942, Crater delivered cargo to Efate and Espiritu Santo, New Hebrides, and Nouméa, New Caledonia before arriving at Wellington, New Zealand, 28 June 1943 to repair and reload.

Crater continued to carry cargo from New Zealand and other supply bases to Guadalcanal and throughout the Solomons until 21 June 1944, when she sailed to operate in the Marshalls and Marianas through the summer. She returned to Guadalcanal, resuming operations in the southwest Pacific until 1 March 1945, when she cleared for overhaul at San Francisco.

She delivered cargo from the west coast at Samar, Philippines, and departed 26 July for Auckland. Crater carried cargo from Auckland and Brisbane, Australia, to Saipan, the Philippines, Manus, Nouméa, and Eniwetok until 5 February 1946, when she sailed for Pearl Harbor, arriving 24 February.

== Decommissioning ==
After a voyage to San Pedro, Los Angeles, Crater was decommissioned at Pearl Harbor 25 June 1946, and was transferred to MARCOM the next day.

== Final disposition ==
Resuming the name John James Audubon on 26 June 1947, after being transferred to the War Shipping Administration (WSA), she was laid up in the Suisun Bay Reserve Fleet, Suisun Bay, California.

On 26 August 1974, she was sold for $466,668 to Seangyong Trading Company, Ltd., Seoul, South Korea, for scrapping. The scrapping of John James Audubon was completed on 30 March 1975.

== Bibliography ==
- "Crater". Dictionary of American Naval Fighting Ships. Naval History and Heritage Command. This article incorporates text from this source, which is in the public domain.
- "Kaiser Permanente No. 2, Richmond CA". ShipbuildingHistory.com. 13 October 2010.
- "USS Crater (AK-70)". NavSource. 27 May 2016.
- "JOHN JAMES AUDUBON". United States Department of Transportation.
- "CRATER (AK-70)". United States Department of Transportation.
- "SS John James Audubon".
