= Nikolai Bukhvostov =

Russian captain (1857–1905)

Nikolai Bukhvostov Николай Бухвостов
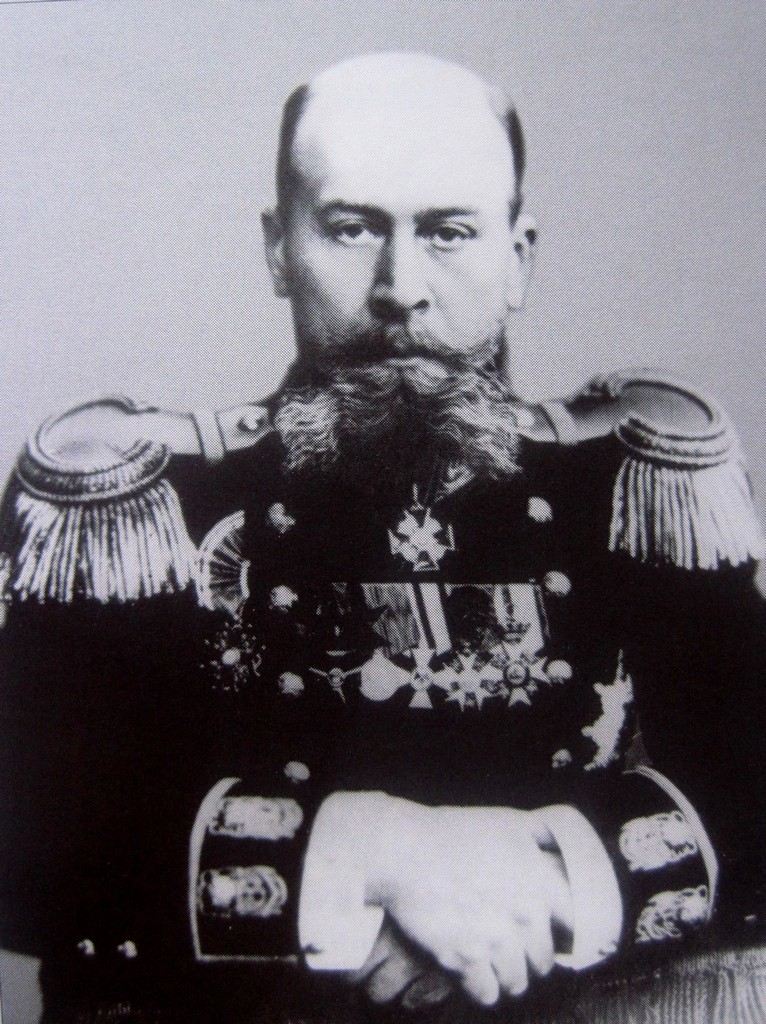
- Born: May 2, 1857; Novorzhevsky District, Pskov, Russia
- Died: May 27, 1905 (aged 48); Straits of Tsushima
- Education: Naval Cadet Corps
- Military career
- Allegiance: Russia
- Branch: Imperial Russian Navy
- Service years: 1874 – 1905
- Rank: Captain 1st Rank
- Unit: Second Pacific Squadron
- Commands: Imperator Aleksandr III
- Conflicts: Russo-Japanese War; Battle of Tsushima †

Nikolai Mikhailovich Bukhvostov (Russian: Никола́й Миха́йлович Бухво́стов) was a Russian Captain 1st Rank and war hero of the Russo-Japanese War. He commanded the Imperator Aleksandr III throughout the war before ultimately being killed during the sinking of the ship at the Battle of Tsushima.

== Biography ==
Born as the son of Mikhail Vasilievich Bukhvostov and Pavel Ivanovna Bukhvostova, Nikolai was a descendant of Sergei Bukhvostov (1659-1728) who was known as the "First Russian Soldier". On September 12, 1873, he was admitted into the Naval Cadet Corps before entering into active service on May 1, 1874. He was promoted to Gardemarin on April 30, 1877, before being assigned to the 4th Naval Crew on May 20, 1877, and promoted to Michman on August 20, 1878. On November 30, 1878, he was seconded to the Guards Naval Crew and transferred to it by November 26, 1879. He was finally given command of the Halibut on March 13, 1880, as well as command of the Canary on March 27, 1881, and promoted to Leytenant on January 1, 1883. He was temporarily part of the Chief of Staff of the Guards Naval Crew and from August 15 to September 1, 1886, he commanded the Teterev and the Rynda from April 21, 1891, to April 23, 1892.

Bukhvostov was then given command of a company of lower ranked staff at Kronstadt before being the Wreed commander of the 1st engine company from January 23 to May 23, 1894. On February 18, 1894, he was made the Senior officer of the yacht Arrow of His Imperial Majesty. From September 24, 1894, to February 8, 1897, he was the Senior officer of the Rynda and promoted to 2nd Rank Captain on December 6, 1894. He was made a member of the commission for the admission of recruits to the Baltic Fleet on September 20, 1896, before going on a business trip on the Black Sea-Azov to combat a plague outbreak from February 21 to June 9, 1897. Duke Alexander of Oldenburg then gave Bukhvostov command of ports on the Black Sea from June 17 to August 15, 1897, as well as given command of the Onega on December 6, 1897. Bukhvostov proceeded to go on another business trip on the Black Sea coast to check the inventory of quarantine institutions and observation stations from February 4 to March 12, 1896. He was given command of the Rynda again from December 15, 1898, to December 7, 1902.

On March 8, 1902, he was commissioned by Alexander Parenago before going to Saigon on December 4, 1902, to receive the Admiral Nakhimov and promoted to Captain 1st Rank on December 6, 1902. He commanded the cruiser from January 17 to September 8, 1903, before being commissioned by Rear-Admiral Konstantin Nikonov to test the Imperator Aleksandr III before given command of the battleship on September 18, 1903. During the Russo-Japanese War, before the departure of the 2nd Pacific Squadron from Kronstadt, he uttered prophetic words: "We will all die, but we will not surrender." During the Battle of Tsushima, the Imperator Aleksandr III was sunk. Of the 867 crew members, not a single person escaped along with Bukhvostov himself.

== Awards ==
- Order of Saint Stanislaus, III Class (January 1, 1889)
- Order of Saint Anna, III Class (January 1, 1894)
- Medal of the Reign of Alexander III (March 2, 1896)
- Order of Saint Stanislaus, II Class (March 1, 1898)
- Order of Saint Anna, II Class (December 6, 1902)
- Order of Saint Vladimir, IV Class (December 27, 1903)

=== Foreign Awards ===
- France: Legion of Honor, Knight (November 22, 1893)
- Germany: Order of the Red Eagle, IV Class (July 25, 1888)
- Germany: House Order of the Wendish Crown, IV Class (August 25, 1894)
- Portugal: Military Order of Aviz, Commander's Cross (November 29. 1903)
