= USAT Meigs =

United States Army transport ship sunk in Darwin Harbour

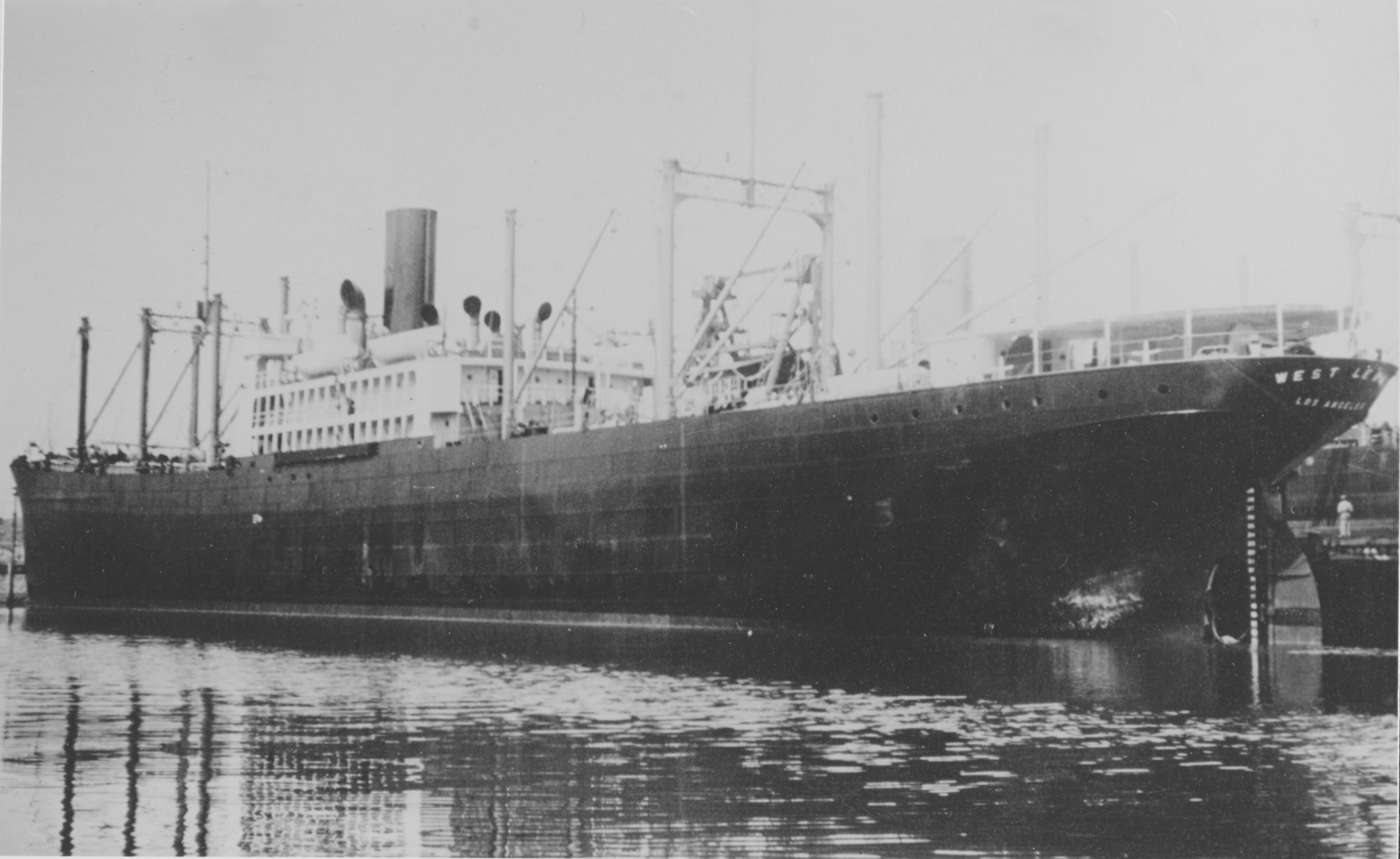
- SS West Lewark, later USAT Meigs

History

United States
- Name: West Lewark (1921–1922); USAT Meigs (1922–1942)
- Owner: US Shipping Board (1921–1922); United States Army (1922–1942)
- Ordered: Before September 1919
- Builder: Los Angeles Shipbuilding & Dry Dock Co
- Laid down: 30 July 1920
- Launched: 24 February 1921
- Completed: June 1921
- Acquired: by US Army 1922
- Out of service: 19 February 1942
- Renamed: 1922
- Fate: Sunk by Japanese air attack, 1942

General characteristics
- Tonnage: 7,358 GRT, 5,310 NRT
- Displacement: 11,358 tons
- Length: 430.7 ft (131.3 m)
- Beam: 54.3 ft (16.6 m)
- Draft: 26.2 ft (8.0 m)
- Installed power: 422 NHP
- Propulsion: 3-cylinder triple-expansion steam engine, single screw
- Sensors & processing systems: wireless direction finding

USAT Meigs (sometimes incorrectly called USS Meigs) was a United States Army transport ship that was built in 1921 and sunk in Darwin Harbour in the first Japanese air raid against the Australia mainland on 19 February 1942.

== Construction ==
The ship's keel was laid 30 July 1920 by the Los Angeles Shipbuilding and Dry Dock Company (later Todd Pacific Shipyards) at San Pedro, California and completed in 1921 for the United States Shipping Board as West Lewark. She had a steel hull, measured 7,358 GRT (also cited as 11,358 DWT), 430.7 ft (131.3 m), 54.3 ft (16.6 m) beam and 26.2 ft (8.0 m) depth. The ship's construction was canceled in 1919 but she was then completed to a larger and different design (Design EFC 1133) than the originally planned Design 1013 and launched 24 February 1921. She was evaluated for naval use with designation ID-4490.

== Service history ==
=== Peacetime service ===
After delivery the ship was operated by the Williams, Diamond & Company, Pacific Coast shippers for the Pacific Coast-European trade. Cargo handling equipment had been designed in light of the fact that many ports lacked sufficient handling equipment ashore to enable efficient cargo operations and initial service demonstrated increased efficiency. West Lewark and sister ship, West Faralon were placed in the company's Pacific Coast-European trade with West Lewark making an initial port call at Glasgow, Scotland. In 1922 the Army acquired the ship and renamed her Meigs.

USAT Meigs was one of the small fleet the Army maintained during the inter-war years and operated in the Pacific as a freight and animal transport. In 1939, with USAT Ludington, Meigs was one of only two Army owned freight transports. Included in the requirement to transport army goods and personal possessions of personnel changing duty stations to the Pacific was transport of cavalry and personal horses of officers with occasional mention of the ship transporting notable horses or owners transferring between Pacific and continental postings. In July 1938 Meigs found an oil slick along the course of the lost Pan American flying boat Hawaii Clipper about 500 miles from Manila, took samples and stood by for further investigation.

=== War service ===
Shortly before the US entry into World War II, the ship was given the tentative Navy hull number AK-34 under an agreement that Navy would take over then commission and crew any Army transports operating in areas of potential naval opposition. The reality of war resulted in a December 1941 Presidential order suspending that agreement and the hull number is listed by Navy as "not used."

USAT Meigs was part of the Pensacola Convoy attempting to reinforce the Philippines in the early stages of the Pacific War and held at Fiji when it was evident the Japanese were already invading the Philippines. Despite a military decision to bring the convoy back to Hawaii or the West Coast, a presidential decision routed the ships to Australia to attempt Philippine support from there. After being part of an abortive convoy escorted by USS Houston and smaller escorts, that had departed on 15 February 1942 in an attempt to reinforce the island of Timor, she returned to the Australian town of Darwin, Northern Territory.

On 19 February 1942 Japanese aircraft attacked Darwin's land and shipping targets in two waves. The Meigs was one of six ships sunk, with one of its crew of 66 killed, after being struck by a number of bombs and aerial torpedoes.

== Wreck ==
Although the superstructure of the wreck was salvaged after the war by Fujita Salvage of Osaka, Japan, the cargo of munitions, railway rails, Bren gun carriers and trucks intended for Allied forces in Portuguese Timor remains. The Meigs is now a dive site, where the remnants of the cargo are as visible as the remains of the vessel itself. It lies in 18 metres (59 ft) of water at coordinates 12°29.26′S 130°49.10′E, and due to the large tidal movements creating strong currents and poor visibility, is only divable around neap tides.

== Namesakes ==
The name USS Meigs is incorrectly applied to the USAT Meigs and also, properly, to the USS General M. C. Meigs (AP-116), which served in the Korean War.

There was also a small Quartermaster Corps passenger and freight steamer built in 1892 by John H. Dialogue & Son, Camden New Jersey, and serving in the early 20th century named General Meigs.

== See also ==
- List of ships sunk by the Imperial Japanese Navy
