= Russian battleship Imperator Aleksandr III (1901) =

Russian Borodino-class battleship

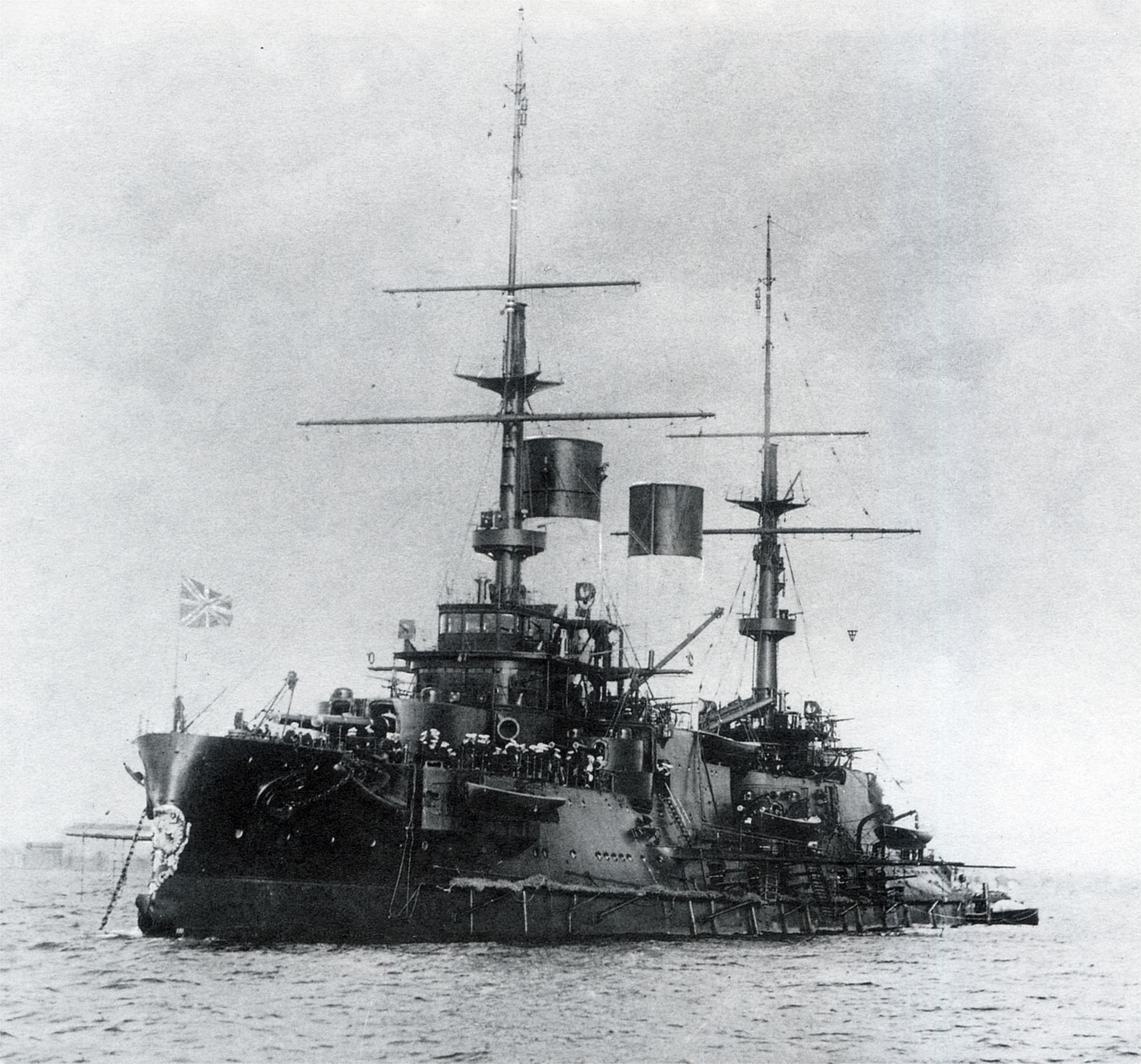
- Imperator Aleksandr III at anchor

History

Russian Empire
- Name: Imperator Aleksandr III
- Namesake: Tsar Alexander III
- Ordered: 26 April 1899 (Note: All dates used in this article are New Style which is 12 days later before 1900 and 13 after 1900.)
- Builder: Baltic Works, Saint Petersburg
- Cost: 13,979,000 rubles
- Laid down: 23 May 1900
- Launched: 3 August 1901
- Completed: November 1903
- Fate: Sunk during the Battle of Tsushima, 27 May 1905

General characteristics
- Class & type: Borodino-class pre-dreadnought battleship
- Displacement: 14,181 long tons (14,409 t) (o/a)
- Length: 397 ft (121 m) (o/a)
- Beam: 76 ft 1 in (23.2 m)
- Draft: 29 ft (8.8 m)
- Installed power: 20 Belleville boilers; 15,800 ihp (11,800 kW)
- Propulsion: 2 shafts, 2 triple-expansion steam engines
- Speed: 18 knots (33 km/h; 21 mph)
- Range: 2,590 nmi (4,800 km; 2,980 mi) at 10 knots (19 km/h; 12 mph)
- Complement: 782 (designed)
- Armament: 2 × twin 12 in (305 mm) guns; 6 × twin 6 in (152 mm) guns; 20 × single 75 mm (3 in) guns; 20 × single 47 mm (1.9 in) guns; 4 × 15 in (381 mm) torpedo tubes
- Armor: Krupp armor; Belt: 5.7–7.64 inches (145–194 mm); Deck: 1–2 inches (25–51 mm); Turrets: 10 inches (254 mm)

Imperator Aleksandr III (Russian: Император Александр III) was one of five Borodino-class battleships built for the Russian Imperial Navy in the first decade of the 20th century. The ship was completed a few months before the start of the Russo-Japanese War in February 1904 and was assigned to the Second Pacific Squadron that was sent to the Far East six months later to break the Japanese blockade of Port Arthur. The Japanese captured the port while the squadron was in transit and their destination was changed to Vladivostok. During the Battle of Tsushima in May 1905, Imperator Alexander III was sunk by Japanese gunfire with the loss of 778 men, her entire crew.

== Design and description ==
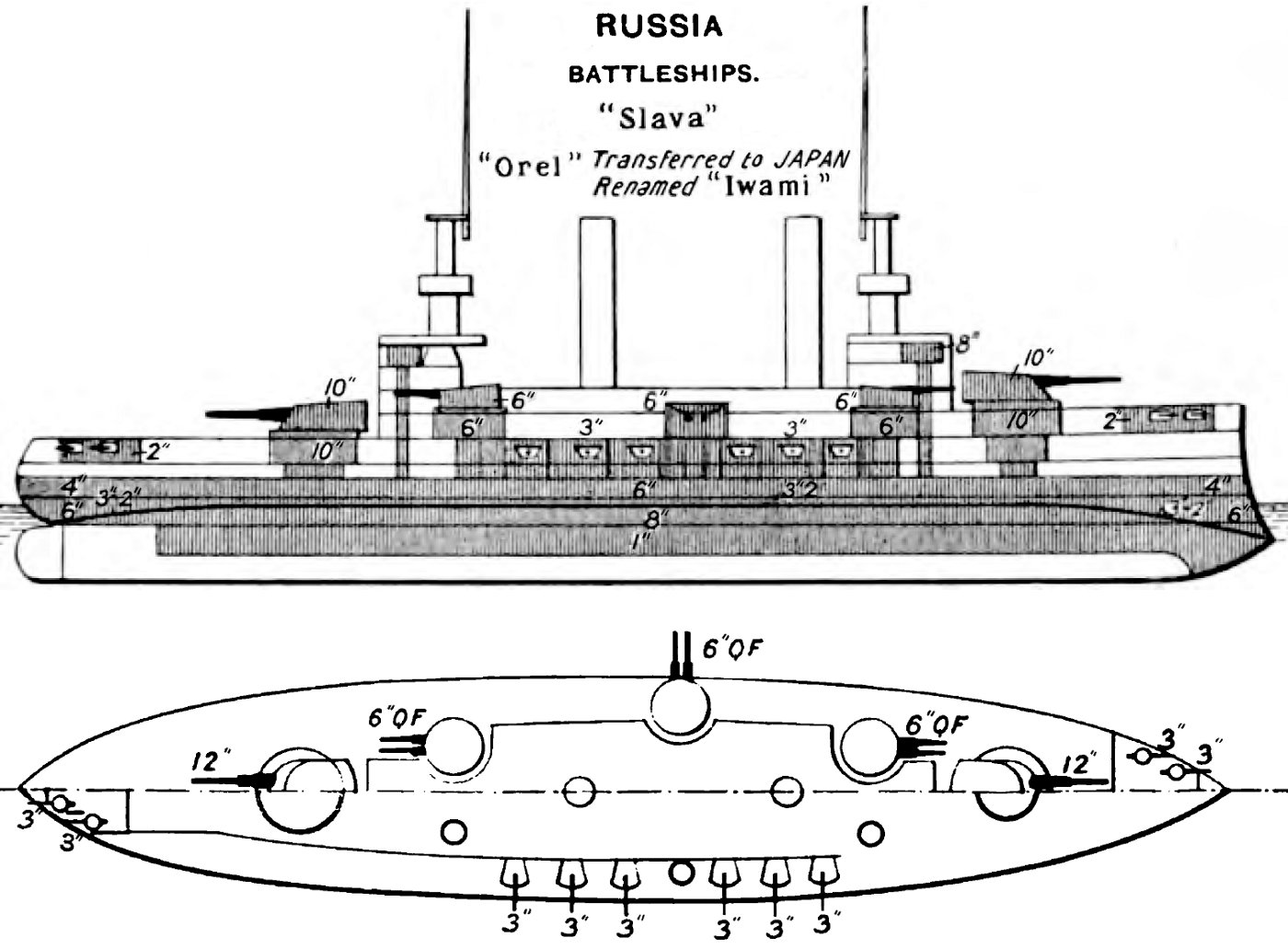
Right elevation and deck plan as depicted in Brassey's Naval Annual 1906

The Borodino-class ships were based on the design of the French-built Tsesarevich, modified to suit Russian equipment and building practices. They were built under the 1898 program "for the needs of the Far East" of concentrating ten battleships in the Pacific. Imperator Aleksandr III was 397 feet (121 m) long overall, had a beam of 76 feet 1 inch (23.19 m) and a draft of around 29 feet 2 inches (8.9 m) at deep load. Designed to displace 13,516 long tons (13,733 t), she was over 600 long tons (610 t) overweight and actually displaced 14,181 long tons (14,409 t). This caused a problem during sea trials on 6 October 1903 when she made a high-speed turn that caused her to heel 15° and flooded the embrasures for the 75-millimeter (3 in) guns. Her intended crew consisted of 28 officers and 754 enlisted men, although she carried 826–846 crewmen in service.

The ship was powered by a pair of four-cylinder vertical triple-expansion steam engines, each driving one propeller shaft, using steam generated by 20 Belleville boilers. The engines were rated at 15,800 indicated horsepower (11,800 kW) and designed to reach a top speed of 18 knots (33 km/h; 21 mph). Imperator Aleksandr III, however, only reached a top speed of 17.7 knots (32.8 km/h; 20.4 mph) from 16,225 indicated horsepower (12,099 kW) during her official machinery trials on 23 July 1903. She carried enough coal to give her a range of 2,590 nautical miles (4,800 km; 2,980 mi) at a speed of 10 knots (19 km/h; 12 mph).

The ship's main battery consisted of four 12-inch (305 mm) guns mounted in two twin-gun turrets, one forward and one aft of the superstructure. The secondary armament consisted of 12 Canet 6-inch (152 mm) quick-firing (QF) guns, mounted in twin-gun turrets. A number of smaller guns were carried for defence against torpedo boats. These included twenty 75-millimeter QF guns and twenty 47-millimeter (1.9 in) Hotchkiss guns. She was also armed with four 15-inch (381 mm) torpedo tubes, one each at the bow and stern above water and two submerged. Imperator Aleksandr III's waterline armor belt consisted of Krupp armor and was 5.7–7.64 inches (145–194 mm) thick. The armor of her gun turrets had a maximum thickness of 10 in (254 mm) and her deck ranged from 1 to 2 inches (25 to 51 mm) in thickness. The 1.5-inch (38 mm) armored lower deck curved downwards and formed an anti-torpedo bulkhead.

== Service ==
Construction began on Imperator Aleksandr III, named after Tsar Alexander III, on 5 September 1899 at the Baltic Works in Saint Petersburg. The ship was laid down on 23 May 1900 and launched on 3 August 1901. In August 1902 she was in Reval for the visit of the German Kaiser, Wilhelm II, and took part in combined fleet maneuvers with ships from the German navy. She was completed in November 1903 at the cost of 13,979,000 rubles.

On 15 October 1904, Imperator Alexandr III set sail for Port Arthur from Libau along with the other vessels of the Second Pacific Squadron, under the overall command of Vice Admiral Zinovy Rozhestvensky. Rozhestvensky led his squadron, including Imperator Alexandr III, down the Atlantic coast of Africa, rounding Cape of Good Hope, and reached the island of Nosy Be off the north-west coast of Madagascar on 9 January 1905 where they remained for two months while Rozhestvensky finalized his coaling arrangements. The squadron sailed for Camranh Bay, French Indochina, on 16 March and reached it almost a month later to await the obsolete ships of the 3rd Pacific Squadron, commanded by Rear Admiral Nikolai Nebogatov. The latter ships reached Camranh Bay on 9 May and the combined force sailed for Vladivostok on 14 May. While exact figures are not available for Imperator Aleksandr III, it is probable that the ship was approximately 1,700 long tons (1,700 t) overweight as she and her sisters were overloaded with coal and other supplies; all of which was stored high in the ships and reduced their stability. The extra weight also submerged the waterline armor belt and left only about 4 feet 6 inches (1.4 m) of the upper armor belt above the waterline.

Rozhestvensky decided to take the most direct route to Vladivostok using the Tsushima Strait and was intercepted by the Japanese battlefleet under the command of Vice Admiral Tōgō Heihachirō on 27 May 1905. At the beginning of the battle, Imperator Alexandr III was second in line behind Rozhestvensky's flagship, Knyaz Suvorov. Very little is known of the ship's actions during the battle as there were no survivors from the ship and visibility was poor for most of the battle, but Captain W. C. Pakenham; the Royal Navy's official military observer under the Anglo-Japanese Alliance, noted that she was set on fire early in the engagement. She did initially follow Knyaz Suvorov when that ship's steering was damaged about a half-hour after the Japanese opened fire at 14:10 but turned north when her captain, Nikolai Bukhvostov, realized that Knyaz Suvorov was out of control. Tōgō tried to concentrate his fire on the crippled Knyaz Suvorov around 16:00, but Bukhvostov turned Imperator Alexandr III straight for the Japanese battleline in a successful attempt to focus their attention on his ship. He was successful, but she was badly damaged in the process. Observers noted that her bow was badly damaged and that there was a large hole in the forward hull on the port side. When the shooting resumed around 18:00, the Japanese concentrated their fire upon the ship and her sister, Borodino. Imperator Alexandr III sheered out of line to port around 18:30 and capsized, but did not sink until 19:07; there were no survivors.

== Memory ==
In 1908, a granite obelisk, designed by Artem Ober and Yakov Filote, was constructed in the surrounding gardens of St. Nicholas Naval Cathedral, Saint Petersburg, to remember the men of the Imperator Aleksandr III.
