= Norman Bowell =

English cricketer (1904–1943)

Personal information
- Full name: Norman Henry Bowell
- Born: 2 February 1904; Oxford, Oxfordshire, England
- Died: 5 March 1943 (aged 39); Balalae Island, British Solomon Islands
- Batting: Right-handed
- Bowling: Right-arm slow
- Relatives: Alex Bowell (father)

Domestic team information
- Years: Team
- 1924: Hampshire
- 1925: Northamptonshire
- 1927–1931: Oxfordshire

Career statistics
Competition	First-class
Matches	3
Runs scored	56
Batting average	18.66
100s/50s	–/–
Top score	48
Balls bowled	84
Wickets	0
Bowling average	–
5 wickets in innings	–
10 wickets in match	–
Best bowling	–
Catches/stumpings	–/–
- Source: Cricinfo, 11 January 2010

Norman Henry Bowell (2 February 1904 – 5 March 1943) was an English first-class cricketer and British Army soldier.

== Cricket and WWII service ==
The son of the cricketer Alex Bowell, he was born in February 1904 at Oxford. Having been on the Hampshire staff from the beginning of the 1920s, he made his debut in first-class cricket for Hampshire against Northamptonshire at Northampton in 1924, but was not required to bat or bowl in a match which was curtailed by poor weather. Bowell travelled with the Hampshire team onto their next fixture which followed immediately after at Trent Bridge against Nottinghamshire, making scores of 2 and 6, in addition to bowling ten wicket-less overs. The following season, he made a single first-class appearance for Northamptonshire against Dublin University, scoring 48 runs in the Northamptonshire first innings, before being dismissed by Gustavus Kelly. Bowell made no further appearances in first-class cricket, but did play minor counties cricket for Oxfordshire from 1927 to 1931, making three appearances in the Minor Counties Championship, all against Monmouthshire.

Bowell served during the Second World War, enlisting as a gunner in the Royal Artillery, where he served in the Straits Settlements with the 35th Light Anti-Aircraft Regiment. He was present during the Fall of Singapore in February 1942 and was captured by the Japanese. He was imprisoned at Changi Prison, before being shipped at the end of 1942 to Balalae Island, in the Japanese-occupied British Solomon Islands with 517 other prisoners of war, in order to construct an airfield for the Japanese. There the prisoners were poorly treated, being subjected to beatings and thrashings on a daily basis, coupled with dysentery, malaria and beriberi afflicting prisoners. As the allies closed in during the Solomon Islands campaign, prisoners who had survived were rounded up and executed by being shot, bayoneted, or decapitated. Bowell succumbed to his ill-treatment in March 1943, though exactly the manner in which he died is unknown; none of the 517 prisoners who were transferred from Singapore alongside Bowell survived their captivity. He is commemorated on the war memorial at the Kranji War Cemetery.
