= Japanese submarine Ro-103 =

1941 submarine

- Ro-103 photographed by an allied aircraft off Rabaul, 16 March 1943

History

Japan
- Name: Submarine No. 213
- Builder: Kure Naval Arsenal, Kure, Japan
- Laid down: 30 June 1941
- Renamed: Ro-103
- Launched: 6 December 1941
- Completed: 21 October 1942
- Commissioned: 21 October 1942
- Fate: Missing after 28 July 1943
- Stricken: 1 November 1943

General characteristics
- Class & type: Ro-100-class submarine
- Displacement: 611 tonnes (601 long tons) surfaced; 795 tonnes (782 long tons) submerged
- Length: 60.90 m (199 ft 10 in) overall
- Beam: 6.00 m (19 ft 8 in)
- Draft: 3.51 m (11 ft 6 in)
- Installed power: 1,000 bhp (750 kW) (diesel); 760 hp (570 kW) (electric motor)
- Propulsion: Diesel-electric; 1 × diesel engine; 1 × electric motor
- Speed: 14.2 knots (26.3 km/h; 16.3 mph) surfaced; 8 knots (15 km/h; 9.2 mph) submerged
- Range: 3,500 nmi (6,500 km; 4,000 mi) at 12 knots (22 km/h; 14 mph) surfaced; 60 nmi (110 km; 69 mi) at 3 knots (5.6 km/h; 3.5 mph) submerged
- Test depth: 75 m (246 ft)
- Crew: 38
- Armament: 4 × bow 533 mm (21 in) torpedo tubes; 2 × 25 mm (1 in) Type 96 anti-aircraft guns or 1 × 76.2 mm (3.00 in) L/40 AA gun

Ro-103 was an Imperial Japanese Navy Ro-100-class submarine. Completed and commissioned in October 1942, she served in World War II, operating in the Solomon Islands, Rabaul, and New Guinea areas and sinking two cargo ships. She disappeared in July 1943 during her fifth war patrol.

== Design and description ==
The Ro-100 class was a medium-sized, coastal submarine derived from the preceding Kaichū type. They displaced 611 tonnes (601 long tons) surfaced and 795 tonnes (782 long tons) submerged. The submarines were 60.9 meters (199 ft 10 in) long, had a beam of 6 meters (19 ft 8 in) and a draft of 3.51 meters (11 ft 6 in). They had a double hull and a diving depth of 75 meters (246 ft).

For surface running, the boats were powered by two 500-brake-horsepower (373 kW) diesel engines, each driving one propeller shaft. When submerged each propeller was driven by a 380-horsepower (283 kW) electric motor. They could reach 14.2 knots (26.3 km/h; 16.3 mph) on the surface and 8 knots (15 km/h; 9.2 mph) underwater. On the surface, the Ro-100s had a range of 3,500 nautical miles (6,500 km; 4,000 mi) at 12 knots (22 km/h; 14 mph); submerged, they had a range of 60 nmi (110 km; 69 mi) at 3 knots (5.6 km/h; 3.5 mph).

The boats were armed with four internal bow 53.3 cm (21.0 in) torpedo tubes and carried a total of eight torpedoes. They were also armed with two single mounts for 25 mm (1 in) Type 96 anti-aircraft guns or a single 76.2 mm (3.00 in) L/40 AA gun.

== Construction and commissioning ==
Ro-103 was laid down as Submarine No. 213 on 30 June 1941 by the Kure Naval Arsenal at Kure, Japan. She had been renamed Ro-103 by the time she was launched on 6 December 1941. She was completed and commissioned on 21 October 1942.

== Service history ==
Upon commissioning, Ro-103 was attached to the Kure Naval District and was assigned to the Kure Submarine Squadron for workups. On 5 January 1943, she was reassigned to Submarine Squadron 7 in the 8th Fleet. She departed Kure that day, called at Truk from 14 January to 4 February 1943, and arrived at Rabaul on New Britain on 8 February 1943.

=== First war patrol ===
Ro-103 got underway from Rabaul on 9 February 1943 for her first war patrol, assigned a patrol area east of Port Moresby, New Guinea. The patrol was uneventful, and she returned to Rabaul on 28 February 1943.

=== Grounding ===
In the Battle of the Bismarck Sea, fought between 2 and 4 March 1943, United States Army Air Forces and Royal Australian Air Force aircraft and United States Navy PT boats annihilated a Japanese convoy in the Bismarck Sea that was attempting to carry the Imperial Japanese Army's 51st Division to Lae on New Guinea, sinking all eight ships of the convoy and four of the eight destroyers escorting them. Ro-103 got underway from Rabaul on 7 March 1943 to rescue survivors.

Ro-103 was in the Solomon Sea off Kiriwina in the Trobriand Islands when she ran aground in darkness on 8 March 1943 on an uncharted reef at 08°20′S 150°45′E. She sent a distress signal to Rabaul, which ordered the submarine Ro-101 to get underway from Rabaul and tow Ro-103 off the reef. Meanwhile, Ro-103's crew lightened her by dumping food, supplies, and torpedoes overboard, but she remained aground. On 10 March 1943, Ro-103 sighted an unidentified destroyer to the south, and her commanding officer ordered her classified documents thrown overboard in anticipation of an attack by the destroyer, but the destroyer apparently did not detect Ro-103 and continued on its way.

After Ro-103's crew dumped diesel fuel and fresh water overboard to further lighten her, Ro-103 finally floated free of the reef on 11 March 1943. Ro-101, which had not yet arrived on the scene, was ordered to return to Rabaul. Ro-103 also made for Rabaul, which she reached on 17 March 1943.

=== Second war patrol ===
After the Combined Fleet initiated Operation I-Go — a reinforcement of the 11th Air Fleet base at Rabaul by planes from the aircraft carriers Zuikaku and Zuihō and of the Japanese naval air base on Balalae Island in the Shortland Islands by planes from the aircraft carriers Hiyō and Jun'yō — Ro-103 departed Rabaul on 30 March 1943 in company with the submarine Ro-102 to support the operation by patrolling in the vicinity of Guadalcanal in the southeastern Solomon Islands. The patrol passed quietly, and she returned to Rabaul on 20 April 1943.

=== Third war patrol ===
On 9 May 1943, Ro-103 departed Rabaul to begin her third war patrol, bound for a patrol area east of Guadalcanal. After another uneventful patrol, she returned to Rabaul on 1 June 1943.

=== Fourth war patrol ===
Ro-103 got underway from Rabaul on 12 June 1943 for her fourth war patrol, assigned a patrol area in the Solomon Islands in the vicinity of Gatukai Island and San Cristobal. She was 50 nautical miles (93 km; 58 mi) south of the eastern tip of San Cristobal on 23 June 1943 when she sighted a convoy of what she identified as three transports escorted by three destroyers. She attacked the convoy in the vicinity of 11°26′S 162°01′E, sinking the cargo ship USS Aludra and so badly damaging the cargo ship USS Deimos that the destroyer USS O'Bannon later scuttled her at 11°35′S 162°08′E.

On 29 June 1943, Ro-103 was on the surface after sunset recharging her batteries when she sighted seven Allied ships south of Gatukai Island. The ships she sighted probably were among those bound for the New Georgia Islands in the central Solomons, where the New Georgia campaign began on 30 June 1943 with the U.S. landings on New Georgia, Rendova, and other islands. Ro-103 returned to Rabaul on 4 July 1943.

=== Fifth war patrol ===
After a week at Rabaul, Ro-103 departed on 11 July 1943 to begin her fifth war patrol. Her orders called for her to patrol in the vicinity of Rendova, but on 13 July 1943 she received new orders to move instead to a patrol area in Vanga Bay off Vangunu. Between 15 and 24 July 1943, she sighted Allied forces three times, but never achieved an attack position against them. She transmitted a message reporting these sightings from a position north of New Georgia on 28 July 1943. The Japanese never heard from her again.

=== Loss ===
The circumstances of Ro-103's loss remain a mystery. On 10 August 1943, the Imperial Japanese Navy declared her to be presumed lost in the Solomon Islands with all 43 men on board. The Japanese struck her from the Navy list on 1 November 1943.
