= Russian battleship Borodino =

Russian lead ship of Borodino-class

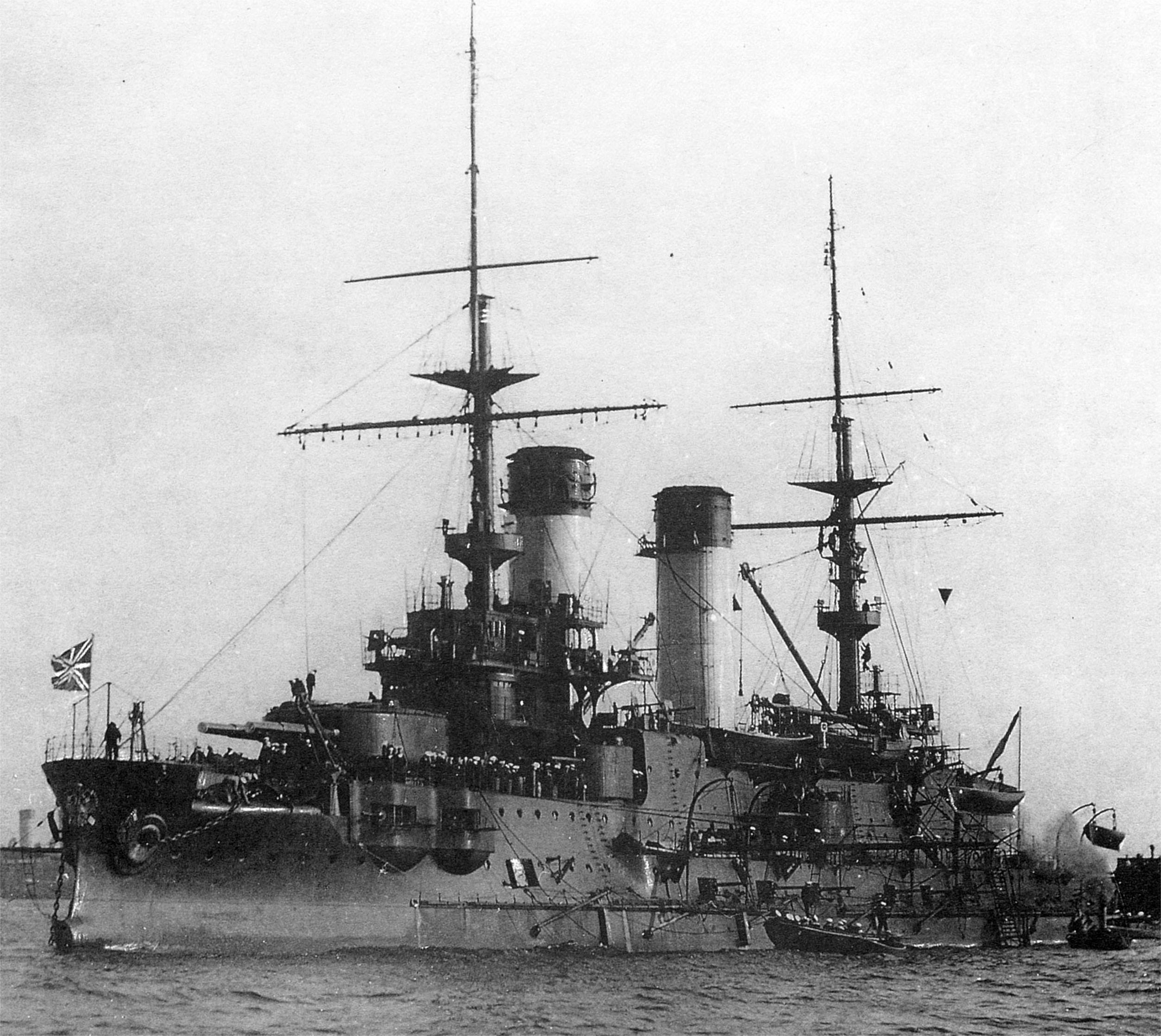
- Borodino at Kronstadt, August 1904

History

Russian Empire
- Name: Borodino (Бородино)
- Namesake: Battle of Borodino
- Builder: New Admiralty Shipyard, Saint Petersburg
- Cost: 14,573,000 rubles
- Laid down: 23 May 1900 (Note: All dates used in this article are new style which is 12 days later before 1900 and 13 after 1900.)
- Launched: 8 September 1901
- In service: August 1904
- Fate: Sunk at the Battle of Tsushima, 27 May 1905

General characteristics
- Class & type: Borodino-class pre-dreadnought battleship
- Displacement: 14,091 long tons (14,317 t)
- Length: 397 ft (121 m) (o/a)
- Beam: 76 ft 1 in (23.2 m)
- Draft: 29 ft 2 in (8.9 m)
- Installed power: 20 Belleville boilers; 16,300 ihp (12,155 kW)
- Propulsion: 2 shafts; 2 triple-expansion steam engines
- Speed: 18 knots (33 km/h; 21 mph)
- Range: 2,590 nmi (4,800 km; 2,980 mi) at 10 knots (19 km/h; 12 mph)
- Complement: 782 (designed)
- Armament: 2 × twin 12 in (305 mm) guns; 6 × twin 6 in (152 mm) guns; 20 × single 75 mm (3 in) guns; 20 × single 47 mm (1.9 in) guns; 4 × 15 in (381 mm) torpedo tubes
- Armor: Krupp armor; Belt: 5.7–7.64 inches (145–194 mm); Deck: 1–2 inches (25–51 mm); Turrets: 10 inches (254 mm)

Borodino (Russian: Бородино) was the lead ship of her class of five pre-dreadnought battleships built for the Imperial Russian Navy in the first decade of the twentieth century. Completed after the beginning of the Russo-Japanese War in 1904, Borodino was assigned to the Second Pacific Squadron that was sent to the Far East a few months after her completion to break the Japanese blockade of Port Arthur. The Japanese captured the port while the squadron was in transit and their destination was changed to Vladivostok. The ship was sunk during the Battle of Tsushima in May 1905 due to explosions set off by a Japanese shell hitting a magazine. There was only a single survivor from her crew of 855 officers and enlisted men.

== Description ==
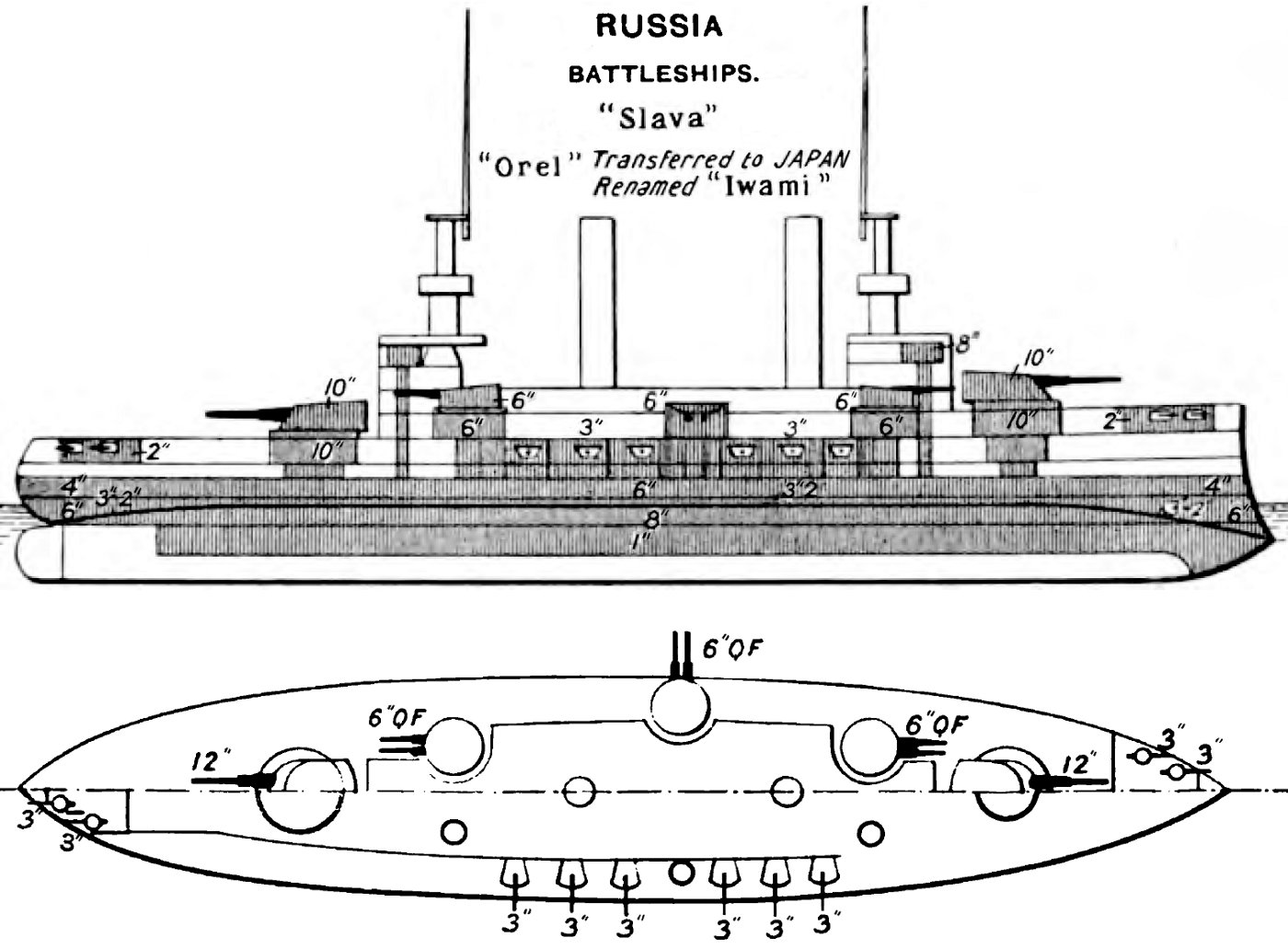
Right elevation and deck plan as depicted in Brassey's Naval Annual 1906

The Borodino-class ships were based on the design of the French-built Tsesarevich, modified to suit Russian equipment and building practices. They were built under the 1898 program "for the needs of the Far East" of concentrating ten battleships in the Pacific. The ships were 389 feet 5 inches (118.7 m) long at the waterline and 397 feet (121 m) long overall, with a beam of 76 feet 1 inch (23.2 m) and a draft of 29 feet 2 inches (8.9 m), 3 feet 2 inches (0.97 m) more than designed. Borodino displaced 14,091 long tons (14,317 t) at normal load, over 500 long tons (508 t) more than her designed displacement of 13,516 long tons (13,733 t). The Borodino class were designed for a crew of 28 officers and 754 enlisted men, although they usually carried 826–846 crewmen in service.

The ships were powered by a pair of vertical triple-expansion steam engines, each driving one shaft, using steam generated by 20 Belleville boilers. The engines were rated at 16,300 indicated horsepower (12,200 kW) and designed to reach a top speed of 18 knots (33 km/h; 21 mph). They produced, however, only 15,012 ihp (11,194 kW) on Borodino's builder's sea trials on 23 August 1904 and gave an average speed of 16.2 knots (30 km/h; 19 mph). The ships could carry enough coal to give them a range of 2,590 nautical miles (4,800 km; 2,980 mi) at a speed of 10 knots (19 km/h; 12 mph).

The main battery of the Borodinos consisted of four 12-inch (305 mm) Pattern 1895 guns were mounted in two twin-gun turrets, one each fore and aft of the superstructure. Their secondary armament of twelve 6-inch (152 mm) Pattern 1892 guns were mounted in six twin-gun turrets carried on the upper deck. Defense against torpedo boats was provided by a suite of smaller guns. The twenty 75-millimeter (3 in) Pattern 1892 guns carried were mounted in casemates in the sides of the hull. The ships also mounted twenty 47-millimeter (1.9 in) Hotchkiss guns in the superstructure. The ships were fitted with four 15-inch (381 mm) torpedo tubes, one each above water in the bow and in the stern, and a submerged tube on each broadside.

The waterline armor belt of the Borodino class consisted of Krupp armor 5.7–7.64 inches (145–194 mm) thick. The armor of their gun turrets had a maximum thickness of 10 inches (254 mm) and their decks ranged from 1 to 2 inches (25 to 51 mm) in thickness. The 1.5-inch (38 mm) armored lower deck of Borodino and her sister Imperator Aleksandr III curved downwards to their double bottom and formed an anti-torpedo bulkhead.

== Service ==
Construction began on Borodino, named after the 1812 Battle of Borodino, on 26 May 1899 at the New Admiralty Shipyard in Saint Petersburg. The ship was laid down on 23 May 1900 in the presence of Tsar Nicholas II, and launched on 8 September 1901. She was completed in August 1904 at the cost of 14,573,000 rubles.

On 15 October 1904, Borodino set sail for Port Arthur from Libau along with the other vessels of the Second Pacific Squadron, under the overall command of Vice admiral Zinovy Rozhestvensky. Rozhestvensky led his squadron, including Borodino, down the Atlantic coast of Africa, rounding the Cape of Good Hope, and reached the island of Nosy Be off the north-west coast of French Madagascar on 9 January 1905 where they remained for two months while Rozhestvensky finalized his coaling arrangements. Two crewmen aboard the battleship died from the heat on 30 December. During this time, Rozhestvensky learned of the capture of Port Arthur and changed his destination to Vladivostok, the only other port controlled by the Russians in the Far East. The squadron sailed for Camranh Bay, French Indochina, on 16 March and reached it almost a month later to await the obsolete ships of the Third Pacific Squadron, commanded by Rear Admiral Nikolai Nebogatov. The latter ships reached Camranh Bay on 9 May and the combined force sailed for Vladivostok on 14 May. While exact figures are not available for Borodino, it is probable that the ship was approximately 1,700 long tons (1,727 t) overweight as she and her sisters were overloaded with coal and other supplies; all of which was stored high in the ships and reduced their stability. The extra weight also submerged the waterline armor belt and left only about 4 feet 6 inches (1.4 m) of the upper armor belt above the waterline.

Rozhestvensky decided to take the most direct route to Vladivostok using the Tsushima Strait and was intercepted by the Japanese battlefleet under the command of Admiral Tōgō Heihachirō on 27 May 1905. At the beginning of the battle, Borodino was third in line behind Rozhestvensky's flagship, Knyaz Suvorov. Very little is known of the ship's actions during the battle as there was only a single survivor from the ship and visibility was poor for most of the battle, but Captain W. C. Pakenham, the Royal Navy's official military observer aboard the Japanese battleship Asahi under the Anglo-Japanese Alliance, noted that she was hit badly around 14:30, some 25 minutes after Russian ships opened fire. Borodino briefly fell out of her position after that hit, but apparently regained it by 14:50. By this time, she had a serious fire on the central portion of her superstructure.

Knyaz Suvorov suffered multiple hits early in the battle, some of which wounded Rozhestvensky and jammed the ship's steering so that she fell out of formation. Around 16:00, Borodino's captain, Petr Serebrennikov, now de facto commander of the fleet, turned Borodino south and led the Russian fleet out of sight. As Japanese cruisers closed in at around 17:05, he turned the fleet north to avoid them, but encountered the Japanese battleships an hour later. They concentrated their fire on Borodino and Imperator Aleksander III, both of which had lists from earlier damage. Pakenham noted a conspicuous hit on Borodino at 18:57 and she was observed to be on fire at 19:04 by observers aboard Tōgō's flagship Mikasa. Pakenham observed two 12-inch hits on Borodino by the battleship Shikishima at 19:18 that started a massive fire. Ten minutes later, after Tōgō ordered his ships to cease fire and disengage, the battleship Fuji fired her already-loaded 12-inch guns before turning away. One of these hit Borodino beneath her starboard forward six-inch turret and ignited the ready-use ammunition in the turret. The fire spread and caused a catastrophic detonation in a nearby six-inch magazine. Subsequent detonations of other magazines blew open her hull and the ship quickly capsized and sank. Only one crewman, Seaman First Class Semyon Yushin, survived the explosion from her crew of 855. He was rescued after surviving for twelve hours in the water.

== Sources ==
- Arbuzov, Vladimir V. (1993). Borodino Class Armored Ships. Armored Ships of the World. Vol. 1. Saint Petersburg: Interpoisk. OCLC 43727130.
- Campbell, N. J. M. (1978). "The Battle of Tsu-Shima". In Preston, Antony (ed.). Warship II. London: Conway Maritime Press. pp. 46–49, 127–135, 186–192, 258–265. ISBN 0-87021-976-6.
- Campbell, N. J. M. (1979). "Russia". In Chesneau, Roger & Kolesnik, Eugene M. (eds.). Conway's All the World's Fighting Ships 1860–1905. New York: Mayflower Books. pp. 170–217. ISBN 0-8317-0302-4.
- Forczyk, Robert (2009). Russian Battleship vs Japanese Battleship, Yellow Sea 1904–05. Duel. Vol. 15. London: Osprey. ISBN 978-1-84603-330-8.
- Gribovsky, Vladimir (2010). Эскадренные броненосцы типа "Бородино" [Borodino Class Squadron Battleships] (in Russian). St. Petersburg: Gangut. ISBN 978-5-904180-10-2.
- McLaughlin, Stephen (2003). Russian & Soviet Battleships. Annapolis, Maryland: Naval Institute Press. ISBN 1-55750-481-4.
- Pleshakov, Constantine (2002). The Tsar's Last Armada: The Epic Journey to the Battle of Tsushima. New York: Basic Books. ISBN 0-465-05791-8.
- Silverstone, Paul H. (1984). Directory of the World's Capital Ships. New York: Hippocrene Books. ISBN 0-88254-979-0.
