= USS Deimos (AK-78) =

Cargo ship of the United States Navy

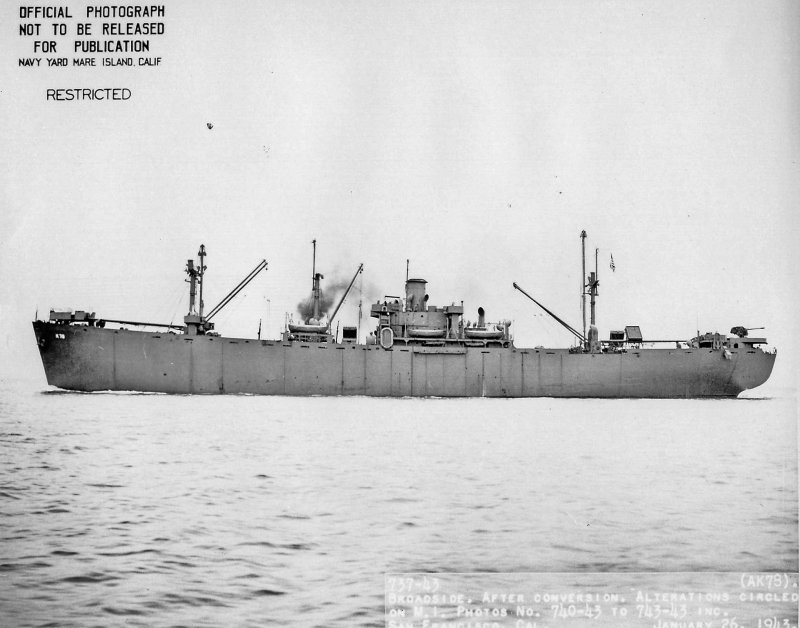
- Broadside view of USS Deimos (AK-78) underway off San Francisco, 26 January 1943.

History

United States
- Name: Hugh McCulloch; Chief Ouray; Deimos
- Namesake: Hugh McCulloch; Chief Ouray; The moon Deimos
- Ordered: as a Type EC2-S-C1 hull, MCE hull 513
- Builder: Permanente Metals Corporation, Richmond, California
- Cost: $1,089,087
- Yard number: 513
- Way number: 5
- Laid down: 27 November 1942
- Launched: 28 December 1942
- Sponsored by: Mrs. Marie Moyer
- Acquired: 7 January 1943
- Commissioned: 23 January 1943
- Identification: Hull symbol: AK-78; Code letters: NYOV
- Honors and awards: 1 × battle star
- Fate: Torpedoed and scuttled, 23 June 1943

General characteristics
- Class & type: Crater-class cargo ship
- Displacement: 4,023 long tons (4,088 t) (standard); 14,550 long tons (14,780 t) (full load)
- Length: 441 ft 6 in (134.57 m)
- Beam: 56 ft 11 in (17.35 m)
- Draft: 28 ft 4 in (8.64 m)
- Installed power: 2 × Oil fired 450 °F (232 °C) boilers, operating at 220 psi (1,500 kPa) , (manufactured by Combustion Engineering); 2,500 shp (1,900 kW)
- Propulsion: 1 × Vertical triple-expansion reciprocating steam engine, (manufactured by Joshua Hendy); 1 × screw propeller
- Speed: 12.5 kn (23.2 km/h; 14.4 mph)
- Capacity: 7,800 t (7,700 long tons) DWT; 444,206 cu ft (12,578.5 m^{3}) (non-refrigerated)
- Complement: 210
- Armament: 1 × 5 in (127 mm)/38 caliber dual-purpose (DP) gun; 1 × 3 in (76 mm)/50 caliber DP gun; 2 × 40 mm (1.57 in) Bofors anti-aircraft (AA) gun mounts; 6 × 20 mm (0.79 in) Oerlikon cannon AA gun mounts

USS Deimos (AK-78) was a Crater-class cargo ship in the service of United States Navy in World War II. It was the first ship of the Navy to have borne the name Deimos, after one of the moons of Mars.

== Construction ==
Deimos was laid down 27 November 1942, as liberty ship SS Hugh McCulloch, renamed SS Chief Ouray, MCE hull 513, by Permanente Metals Corporation, Richmond, California, under a United States Maritime Commission (MARCOM) contract. Deimos was launched on 28 December 1942 and sponsored by Mrs. Marie Moyer. Deimos was transferred to the Navy on 7 January 1943, and commissioned 23 January 1943.

== Service history ==
Deimos sailed from San Francisco 27 January 1943, with cargo for Espiritu Santo, New Hebrides, and Townsville, Australia. She arrived at Nouméa, New Caledonia, 23 May, to load cargo which she delivered to Guadalcanal in June. Returning to her base, she was torpedoed by the Imperial Japanese Navy submarine Ro-103 on 23 June, on the port side, aft. Efforts to save her failed. She was finally abandoned and sunk by gunfire by the destroyer O'Bannon (DD-450) at 11°26′S 162°01′E.

== Awards ==
Deimos received one battle star for World War II service.

== Bibliography ==
- "Cetus". Dictionary of American Naval Fighting Ships. Naval History and Heritage Command. 6 July 2015. This article incorporates text from this source, which is in the public domain.
- "Kaiser Permanente No. 1, Richmond CA". ShipbuildingHistory.com. 13 October 2010.
- "USS Deimos (AK-78)". NavSource. 6 September 2013.
- "SS Chief Ouray".
