= Balalae Island =

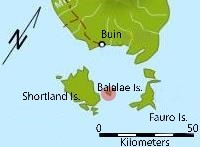
- Location of Balalae Island; the southern end of Bougainville Island can be seen at the top

- Location in Solomon Islands
- Coordinates: 006°59′20″S 155°52′53″E
- Country: Solomon Islands
- Province: Western Province
- Island group: Shortland Islands Group

Balalae Island (or Ballale/Ballali) is an island of the Shortland Islands Group in Western Province, Solomon Islands.

== Early history ==
Ballale means border place in the local Alu language. As long as the natives of the Shortland Islands can remember, the island was uninhabited. According to a local legend, a strange blue light was often observed over the island. Therefore, the island was avoided, and, traditionally, no one lived there. For the local people, Ballale Island was considered a haunted place (sacu-sacu). War groups from neighbouring Buka Island used this uninhabited island to cannibalize their prisoners captured during successful tribal feuds and headhunting raids to Choiseul Island.

Englishman Sam Atkinson purchased the island in 1901 and established a coconut plantation, harvesting copra. The plantation included the Atkinson family home, as well as copra drying sheds and living quarters for workers. Copra was exported by boat. When Sam Atkinson died in 1931, his wife Edith kept on managing the plantation. She remained on the island until early 1942 when the British colonial government ordered all Europeans to be evacuated from the Solomons Islands.

== World War II ==
The island was the scene of a Japanese war crime during the Second World War. A work party of 517 British prisoners of war from various artillery regiments captured after the Battle of Singapore were transported to the island under the command of Lt. Col. John Bassett to build an airfield. Amongst the prisoners was the English cricketer Norman Bowell. When the airfield was completed the prisoners, including their commander Bassett, were executed. The mass graves were discovered after the war. Japanese authorities claimed that the prisoners were lost at sea when their transport was torpedoed.

This base was the intended destination from Rabaul of Japanese Admiral Isoroku Yamamoto when his inspection flight was intercepted and shot down on April 18, 1943, near the later site of Buin, Bougainville Island, killing him.

== Sale of relics ==
In 2007, the Solomon Islands Government agreed to an arrangement for the sale of all World War II relics at the community of Balalae in Shortlands to an international group. The agreement allowed for the removal of the remains of 11 Japanese planes that had been in place since World War II.
