= USS Aludra (AK-72) =

Cargo ship of the United States Navy

Coordinates: 11°35′S 162°8′E

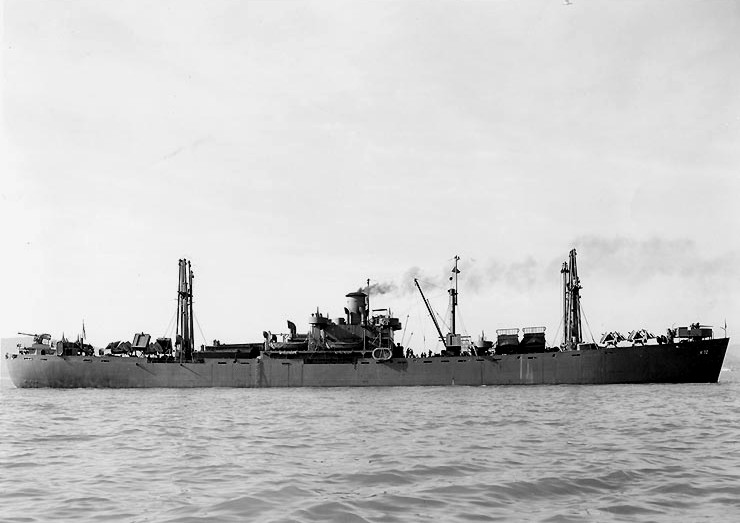
- USS Aludra (AK-72), c. late 1942 or early 1943 – note her deck cargo of four Grumman F4F "Wildcat" fighters and several landing craft

History

United States
- Name: Robert T. Lincoln; Aludra
- Namesake: Robert T. Lincoln; The star Aludra
- Ordered: as a Type EC2-S-C1 hull, MCE hull 437
- Builder: Permanente Metals Corporation, Richmond, California
- Cost: $1,139,342
- Yard number: 437
- Way number: 8
- Laid down: 2 October 1942
- Launched: 7 December 1942
- Sponsored by: Mrs. Dorothy A. Rainbow
- Acquired: 14 December 1942
- Commissioned: 26 December 1942
- Out of service: 23 June 1943
- Renamed: Aludra, 30 October 1942
- Identification: Hull symbol: AK-72; Code letters: NXWU
- Honors and awards: 1 × battle star
- Fate: Torpedoed and sunk by Ro-103, 23 June 1943

General characteristics
- Class & type: Crater-class cargo ship
- Type: Type EC2-S-C1
- Displacement: 4,023 long tons (4,088 t) (standard); 14,550 long tons (14,780 t) (full load)
- Length: 441 ft 6 in (134.57 m)
- Beam: 56 ft 11 in (17.35 m)
- Draft: 28 ft 4 in (8.64 m)
- Installed power: 2 × Oil fired 450 °F (232 °C) boilers, operating at 220 psi (1,500 kPa) , (manufactured by Babcock & Wilcox); 2,500 shp (1,900 kW)
- Propulsion: 1 × Vertical triple-expansion reciprocating steam engine, (manufactured by Joshua Hendy); 1 × screw propeller
- Speed: 12.5 kn (23.2 km/h; 14.4 mph)
- Capacity: 7,800 t (7,700 long tons) DWT; 444,206 cu ft (12,578.5 m^{3}) (non-refrigerated)
- Complement: 205
- Armament: 1 × 5 in (127 mm)/38-caliber dual-purpose gun; 1 × 3 in (76 mm)/50-caliber dual-purpose gun; 6 × 20 mm (0.8 in) Oerlikon cannons anti-aircraft gun mounts

USS Aludra (AK-72) was a Crater-class cargo ship in the service of the US Navy in World War II. Named after the star Aludra in the constellation Canis Major, it was the first ship of the Navy to bear this name.

== Construction ==
Aludra was laid down 28 October 1942, as liberty ship SS Robert T. Lincoln under a Maritime Commission (MARCOM) contract, MC hull 437, by Permanente Metals Corporation, Yard No. 2, Richmond, California; launched on 7 December 1942; sponsored by Mrs. Dorothy A. Rainbow; renamed Aludra on 30 October 1942; delivered to the Navy on 14 December 1942; and placed in commission at San Francisco, California, on 26 December 1942.

== Service history ==
The new cargo ship joined the Pacific Fleet and held brief shakedown training before departing the west coast on 7 January 1943. She anchored in Dumbea Bay, New Caledonia, on 29 January. The vessel got underway on 2 February for Havannah Harbor, Efate Island, and arrived there two days later. Aludra continued on to Espiritu Santo, where she remained from 11 February through 6 May.

The vessel left Espiritu Santo on 6 May in company with Brooks. The two ships reached Brisbane, Australia, on 11 May and took on cargo. Aludra sailed on 17 May for Auckland, New Zealand. She arrived there on 23 May and spent one week in port taking on supplies and equipment. The ship left Auckland on 30 May but returned that same day to repair a steering casualty. She got underway again on 31 May.

=== Sinking ===
Aludra made port calls at Nouméa, New Caledonia, and Guadalcanal. She departed the latter port on 22 June, bound for Espiritu Santo. At 04:44 on 23 June, a torpedo fired by Japanese submarine Ro-103 (Ro-100-class submarine) hit Aludra's port side and exploded. Approximately five hours later, at 09:33, the cargo ship sank in over 2,000 fathoms (12,000 ft; 3,700 m) of water. Two of her crew members were killed and 12 were wounded.

== Awards ==
Aludra earned one battle star for her World War II service.

== Bibliography ==
- "Aludra I (AK-72)". Dictionary of American Naval Fighting Ships. Naval History and Heritage Command. 16 June 2015. This article incorporates text from this source, which is in the public domain.
- "Kaiser Permanente No. 2, Richmond CA". www.ShipbuildingHistory.com. 13 October 2010.
- "USS Aludra (AK-72)". NavSource. 20 May 2016.
- "SS Robert T.Lincoln".
