= Junk (ship) =

Traditional Chinese type of boat

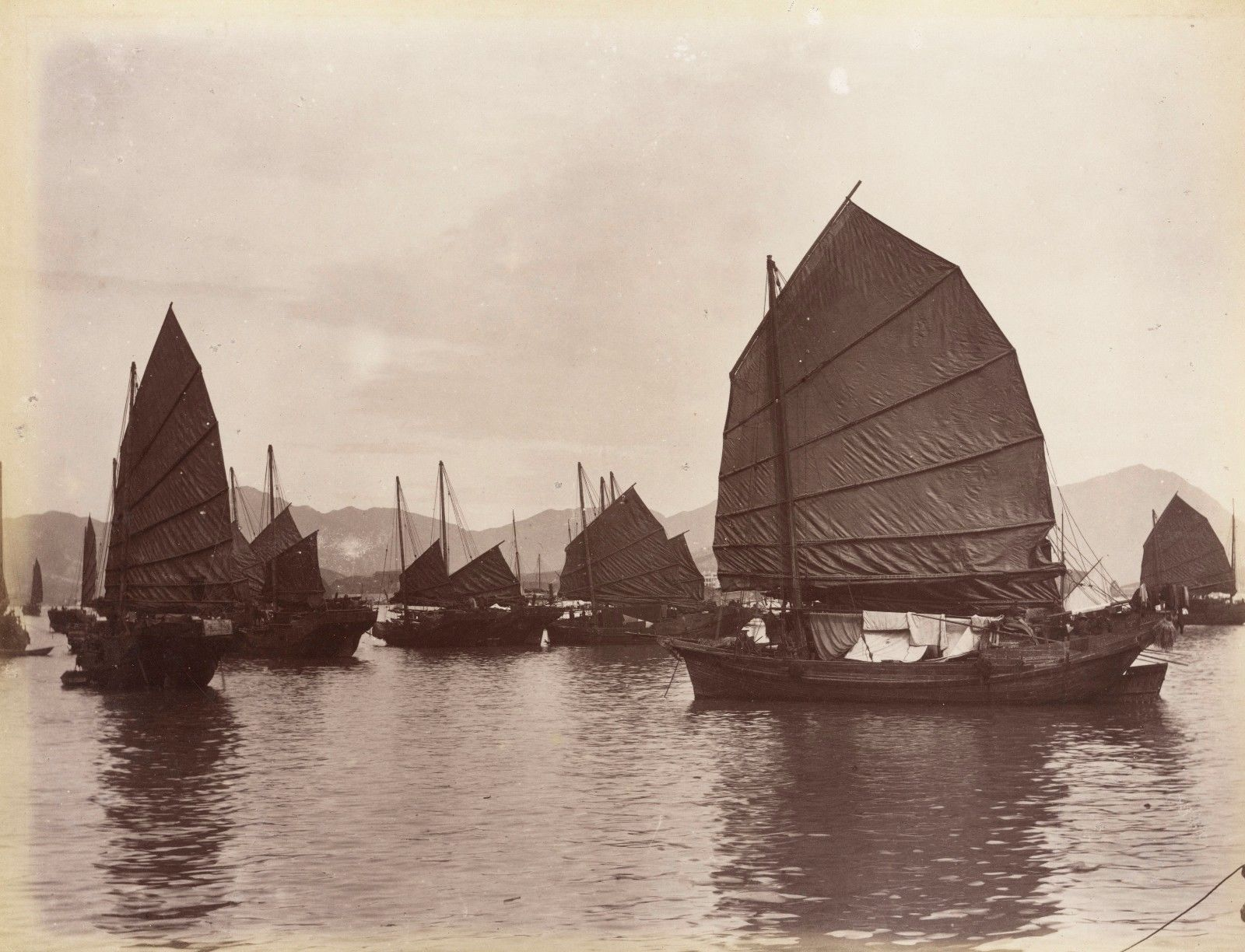
Junks in Guangzhou, photograph c. 1880 by Lai Afong

A junk (Chinese: 船; pinyin: chuán) is a type of Chinese sailing ship characterized by a central rudder, an overhanging flat transom, watertight bulkheads, and a flat-bottomed design. They are also characteristically built using iron nails and clamps. The term applies to many types of small coastal or river ships, usually serving as cargo ships, pleasure boats, or houseboats, but also going up in size up to large ocean-going vessels. There can be significant regional variations in the type of rig and the layout of the vessel.

Chinese junks were originally only fluvial and had square sails, but by the Song dynasty (c. 960 to 1279), they adopted ocean-going technologies acquired from Southeast Asian k'un-lun po trade ships. Tanja sails and fully battened junk rigs were introduced to Chinese junks by the 12th century CE.

Similar designs to the Chinese junk were also adopted by other East Asian countries, most notably Japan, where junks were used as merchant ships to trade goods with China and Southeast Asia.

== Etymology and history of the term ==
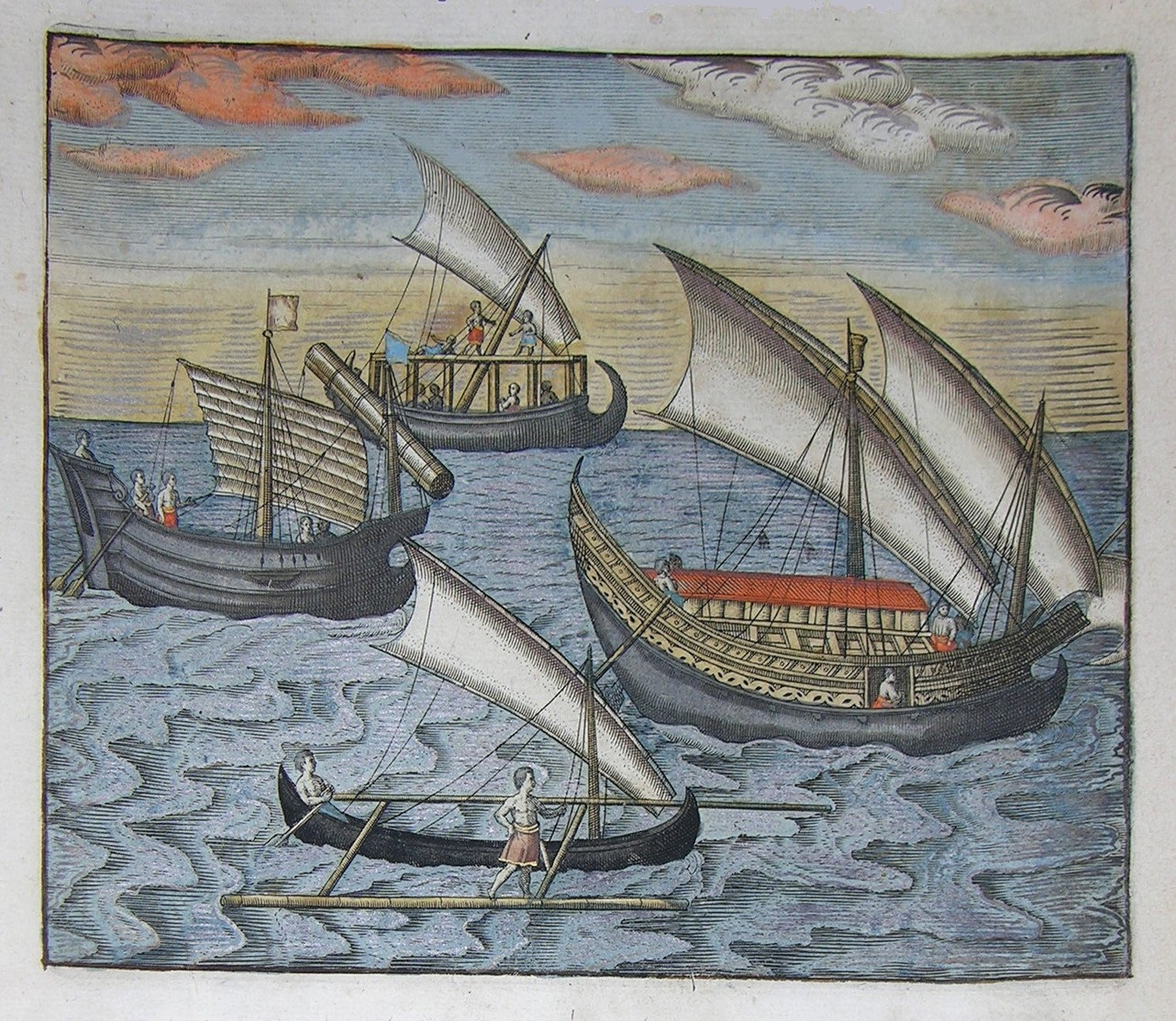
Early European illustration of Southeast Asian jongs and other smaller craft (D'Eerste Boeck, c. 1599), note the double rudders which distinguished Southeast Asian ships from the Chinese chuán which had a central rudder

The English word "junk" comes from Portuguese junco from Malay jong, which was in turn loaned from the Old Javanese word jong. The word originally referred to large trading ships that the Portuguese first encountered in Southeast Asia. It later also included the smaller flat-bottomed Chinese chuán, even though the two were markedly different vessels. After the disappearance of the jong in the 17th century, the meaning of "junk" (and other similar words in European languages) came to refer exclusively to the Chinese ship.

The Chinese chuán and the Southeast Asian djong are frequently confused with each other and share some characteristics, including large cargo capacities, multiple (two to three) superimposed layers of hull planks, and multiple masts and sails. However the two are readily distinguishable from each other by two major differences. The first is that Southeast Asian (Austronesian) ships are built exclusively with lugs, dowels, and fiber lashings (lashed lug), in contrast to Chinese ships which are always built with iron nails and clamps. The second is that Chinese ships since the first century AD are all built with a central rudder. In contrast, Southeast Asian ships use double lateral rudders.

The development of the sea-going Chinese chuán (the "junk" in modern usage) in the Song dynasty (c. 960 to 1279) is believed to have been influenced by regular contacts with sea-going Southeast Asian ships (the k'un-lun po of Chinese records) in trading ports in southern China from the 1st millennium CE onward, particularly in terms of the rigging, multiple sails, and the multiple hull sheaths. However, the chuán also incorporates distinctly Chinese innovations from their indigenous river and coastal vessels (namely watertight compartments and the central rudders). "Hybrid" ships (referred to as the "South China Sea tradition") integrating technologies from both the chuán and the jong also started to appear by the 15th century.

== Construction ==
=== Sails ===
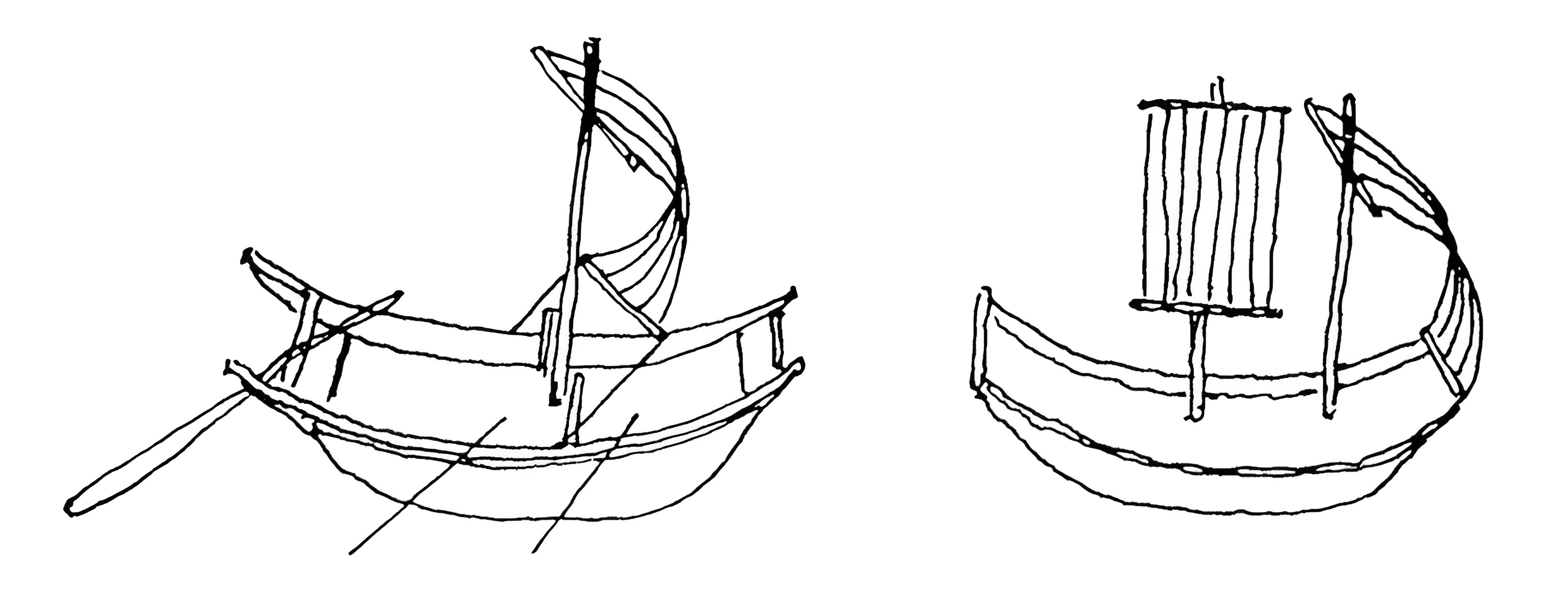
Tracing of two ships from Dunhuang cave temple, c. 8th–9th century CE. The ships showed square sails. A stern sculling oar is also present (known as a yuloh, 摇橹).

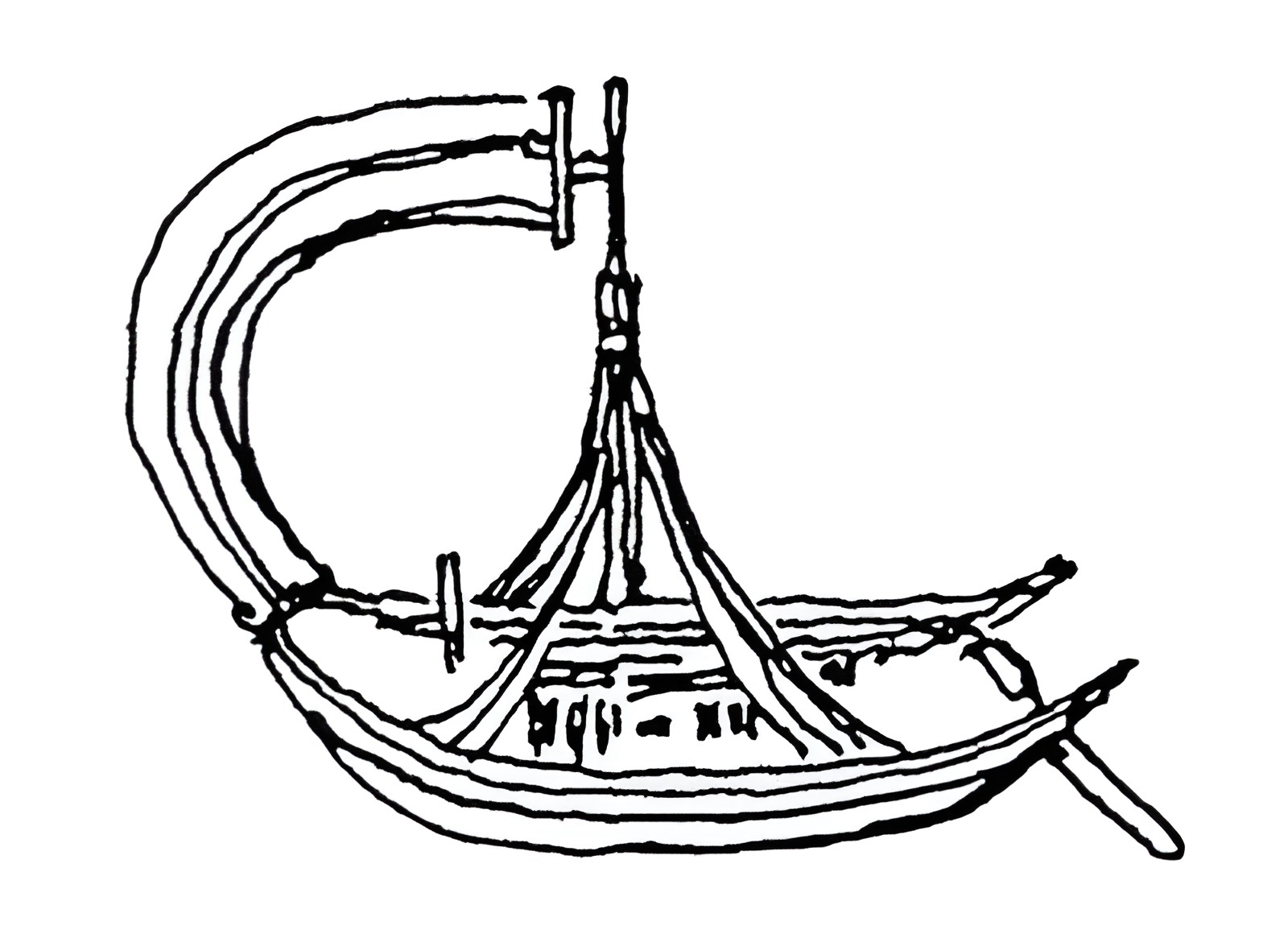
Tracing of a ship on a mirror in the Shaanxi museum (circa 9th or 12th century CE)

Iconographic remains show that Chinese ships before the 12th century used square sails. A ship carving from a stone Buddhist stele shows a ship with square sail from the Liu Sung dynasty or the Liang dynasty (c. 5th or 6th century). Dunhuang cave temple no. 45 (from the 8th or 9th century) features large sailboats and sampans with inflated square sails. A wide ship with a single sail is depicted in the Xi'an mirror (after the 9th or 12th century). Eastern lug sail, which used battens and is commonly known as "junk rig", was likely not Chinese in origin: The oldest depiction of a battened junk sail comes from the Bayon temple at Angkor Thom, Cambodia. From its characteristics and location, it is likely that the ship depicted in Bayon was a Southeast Asian ship. The Chinese themselves may have adopted them around the 12th century CE.

The full-length battens of the junk sail keep the sail flatter than ideal in all wind conditions. Consequently, their ability to sail close to the wind is poorer than other fore-and-aft rigs.

=== Hull ===
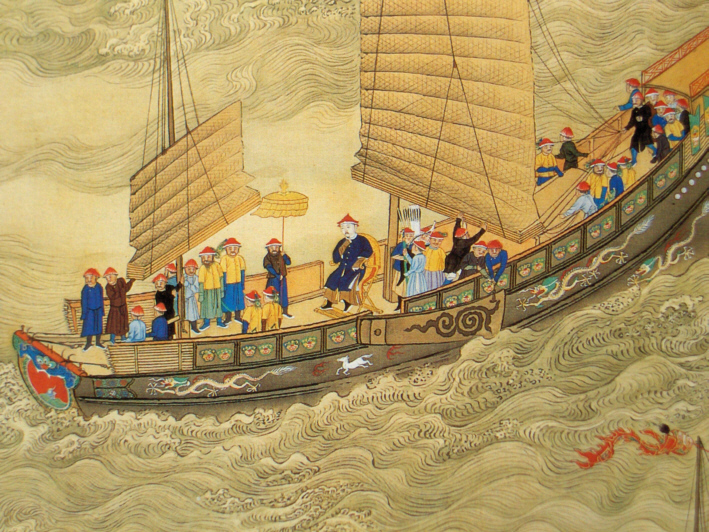
The Kangxi Emperor (r. 1654–1722) on a tour, seated prominently on the deck of a junk ship

Unlike other major shipbuilding traditions which developed from dugout canoes, the junk evolved from tapering rafts. It is the reason for the unique characteristics of early Chinese junks, like the absence of keels, very low decks, and solid transverse bulkheads rather than ribs or internal frames.

Classic junks were built of softwoods (although after the 17th century teak was used in Guangdong) with the outside shape built first. Then multiple internal compartment/bulkheads accessed by separate hatches and ladders, reminiscent of the interior structure of bamboo, were built in. Traditionally, the hull has a horseshoe-shaped stern supporting a high poop deck. The bottom is flat in a river junk with no keel (similar to a sampan), so that the boat relies on a daggerboard, leeboard or very large rudder to prevent the boat from slipping sideways in the water.

The internal bulkheads are characteristic of junks, providing interior compartments and strengthening the ship. They also controlled flooding in case of holing. Ships built in this manner were written of in Zhu Yu's book Pingzhou Table Talks, published by 1119 during the Song dynasty. Again, this type of construction for Chinese ship hulls was attested to by the Moroccan Muslim Berber traveler Ibn Battuta (1304–1377 CE), who described it in great detail (refer to Technology of the Song dynasty).

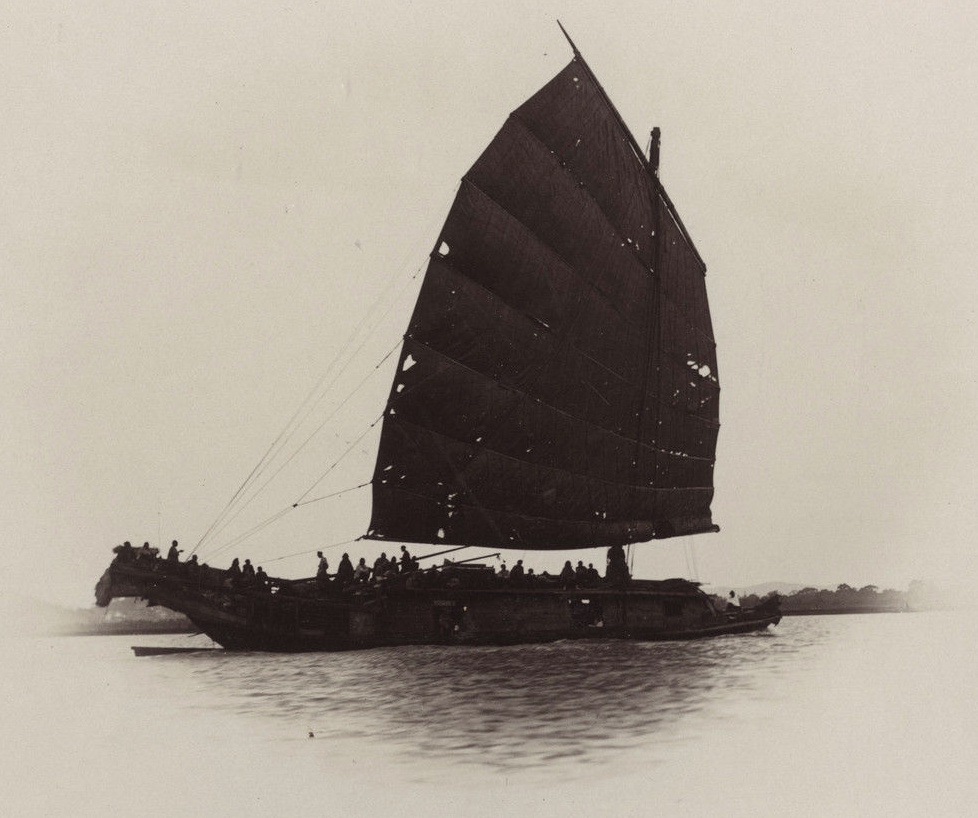
Junk near Hong Kong, circa 1880

Benjamin Franklin wrote in a 1787 letter on the project of mail packets between the United States and France:

As these vessels are not to be laden with goods, their holds may without inconvenience be divided into separate apartments, after the Chinese manner, and each of these apartments caulked tight so as to keep out water.

— Benjamin Franklin, 1787

Similar wet wells were also apparent in Roman small craft of the 5th century CE.

Tung oil and mixtures containing it was used for waterproofing for Chinese ships. Marco Polo wrote in the 13th century "The Chinese take some lime and chopped hemp, and these they knead together with a certain wood oil; and when the three are thoroughly amalgamated they hold like any glue, and with this mixture they paint their ships". This putty, known as Tung putty (桐油灰, lit. "tung oil ash") was used to seal the seams and holes in the hull and decks to make them seaworthy. Loose hemp or coir rope were coated with the putty wetted with more tung oil and pounded into the seams with a caulking iron or pointing tool, and then sealed with more of the tung putty.

=== Leeboards and centerboards ===
Other innovations included the square-pallet bilge pump, which was adopted by the West during the 16th century for work ashore, the western chain pump, which was adopted for shipboard use, being of a different derivation. Junks also relied on the compass for navigational purposes. However, as with almost all vessels of any culture before the late 19th century, the accuracy of magnetic compasses aboard ship, whether from a failure to understand deviation (the magnetism of the ship's iron fastenings) or poor design of the compass card (the standard drypoint compasses were extremely unstable), meant that they did little to contribute to the accuracy of navigation by dead reckoning. Review of the evidence shows that the Chinese embarked magnetic pointer was only sometimes used for navigation or reorientation. The reasoning is simple. Chinese mariners were as capable as any, having undertaken the journey safely for hundreds of years, had they needed a compass as an essential tool to navigate, they would have been aware of the almost random directional qualities when used at sea of the water bowl compass they used. Yet that design remained unchanged for some half a millennium. Western sailors, coming upon a similar water bowl design (no evidence as to how has yet emerged) very rapidly adapted it in a series of significant changes such that within roughly a century the water bowl had given way to the dry pivot, a rotating compass card a century later, a lubberline a generation later and gimbals seventy or eighty years after that.

=== Steering ===
Junks employed stern-mounted rudders centuries before their adoption in the West for the simple reason that Western hull forms, with their pointed sterns, obviated a centreline steering system until technical developments in Scandinavia created the first, iron mounted, pintle and gudgeon 'barn door' western examples in the early 12th century CE. A second reason for this slow development was that the side rudders in use were still extremely efficient. Thus the junk rudder's origin, form and construction was completely different in that it was the development of a centrally mounted stern steering oar, examples of which can also be seen in Middle Kingdom (c. 2050–1800 BCE) Egyptian river vessels. It was an innovation which permitted the steering of large ships and due to its design, allowed height adjustment according to the depth of the water and to avoid serious damage should the junk ground. A sizable junk can have a rudder that needed up to twenty members of the crew to control in strong weather. In addition to using the sail plan to balance the junk and take the strain off the hard to operate and mechanically weakly attached rudder, some junks were also equipped with leeboards or dagger boards. The world's oldest known depiction of a stern-mounted rudder can be seen on a pottery model of a junk dating from before the 1st century CE.

== History ==
=== Han to Northern and southern dynasties era (2nd–6th century) ===
Chinese ships at this time were heavily fluvial (riverine) in nature and operation, while a minority was focused on travel on the open seas and oceans. Chinese ships in the ancient era crossed the East China Sea and visited regions such as Taiwan, Korea, and Japan. Chinese ships did not make regular maritime voyages to Southeast Asia and beyond until the 9th century CE. Heng suggests an even later date (11th century CE) for the beginning of Chinese maritime shipping, when the first actual records of Chinese ships (mostly from Fujian and Guangdong) leaving for foreign trade appear.

Large Austronesian trading ships docking in Chinese seaports with as many as four sails were recorded by scholars as early as the 3rd century CE. They called them the kunlun bo or kunlun po (崑崙舶; 'ship of the Kunlun people'). They were described as being capable of sailing against strong winds and violent waves, implying that Chinese ships at that time did not have that capacity. These ships were booked by Chinese Buddhist pilgrims for passage to Southern India and Sri Lanka. In the 3rd century CE, Chinese envoys were also sent to Southeast Asia ("Nanhai"), all of them explicitly used foreign ships for passage.

=== Sui to Tang dynasty (7th century–9th century) ===
In 683 CE, Tang court sent an envoy to Srivijaya, which does not mention a ship or even a mission, implying that like in previous cases, the envoy booked passage in a foreign ship. Wang (1958) stated that there are no Tang dynasty records that mentioned Chinese junks being used for trading with Southeast Asia. Kunlun bo trade increased by the 9th century, and were described as arriving regularly in trading ports in southern China in Chinese records.

Around 770 CE, there was great activity in canal and river boat construction, attributed to Liu Yen, who created 10 shipwright yards and provided competitive rewards. Chu LingYiin, for example, deployed many-decked naval vessels in the Wu Tai Battle of 934 AD.

=== Rise of Song dynasty (10th–13th century) ===
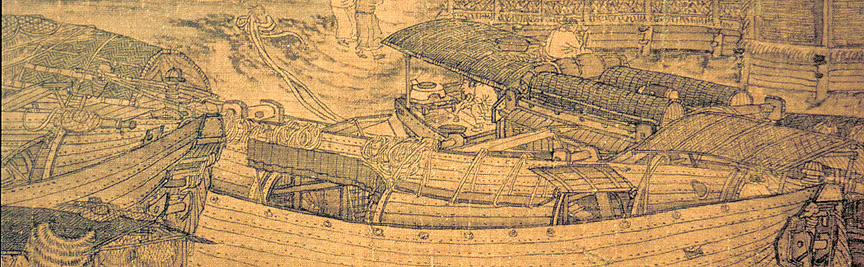
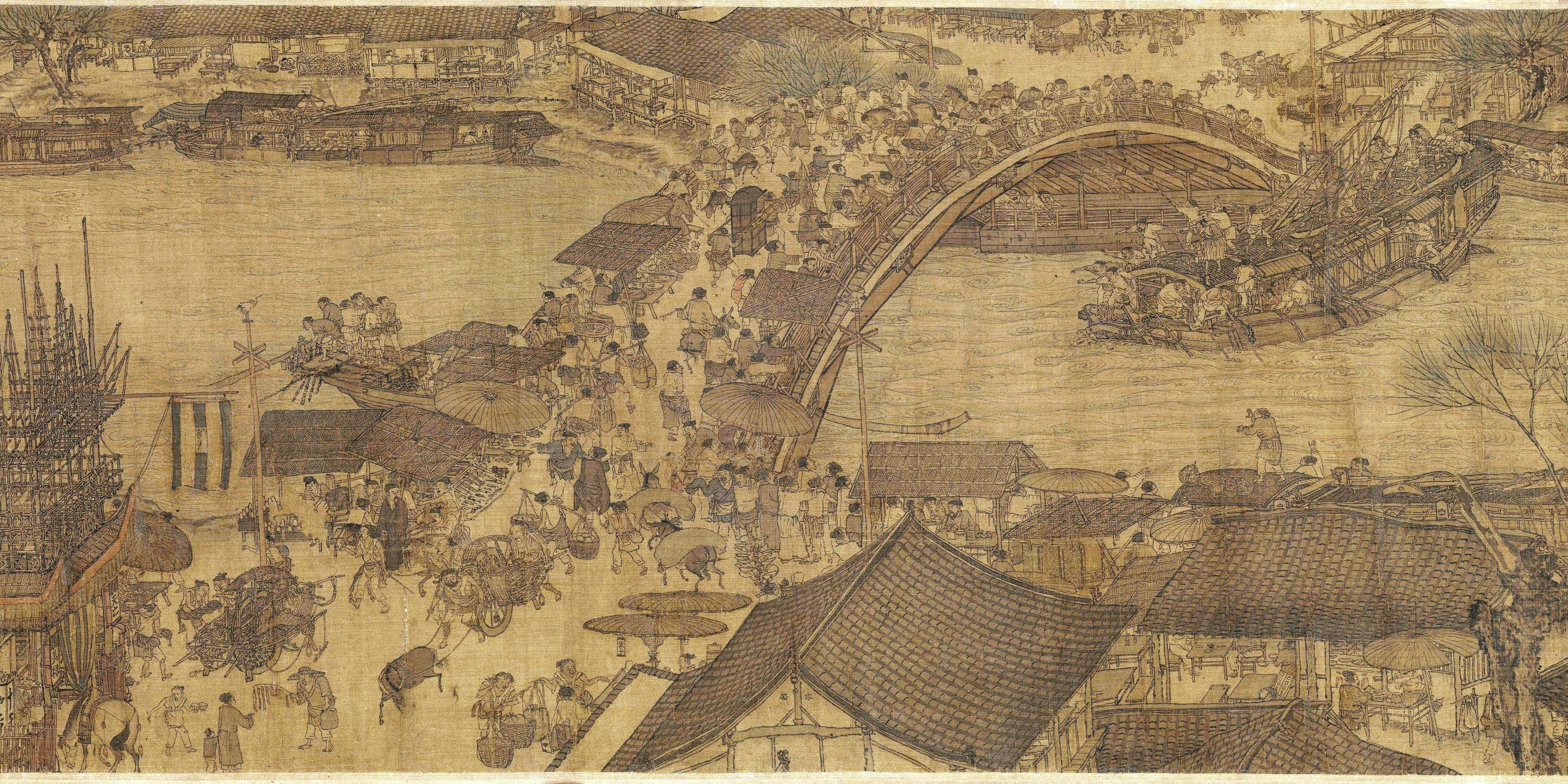
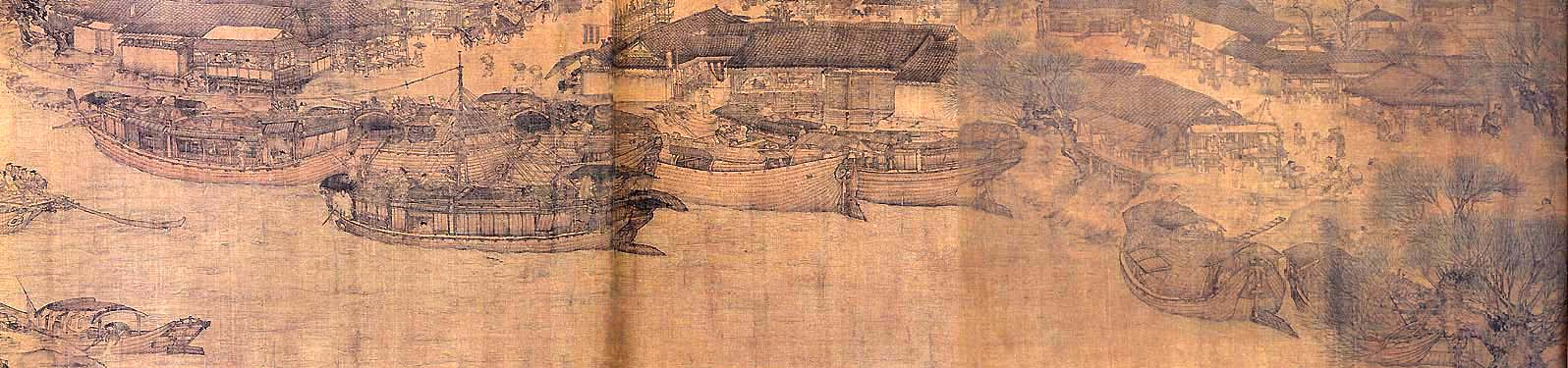
A Northern Song dynasty (960–1127) era painting of a city with scenery of the surrounding river ships and transports, Zhang Zeduan's (1085–1145) painting Along the River During Qingming Festival

The state of Wuyue established diplomatic and maritime trade relations with Japan and the Korean states since at least 935 CE until Wuyue was absorbed by the Song dynasty in 978 CE. The relations of Wuyue with Japan and Korea were primarily motivated by Buddhism.

In 989 CE, the Song court permitted private Chinese ships to trade overseas, due to the loss of access to the northern trading routes along the Silk Road. However regulations required ships to depart and return at specific ports that they were registered to, which stifled early trade. This regulation was modified in 1090, when the Song court decreed that ships could freely register and depart from any port. The first records of Chinese ships leaving for trade abroad appear in the 11th century, mostly to Southeast Asia, but also included records of trade with Japan and the Korean states. A stipulation requiring ships to return within 9 months was added by the second half of the 11th century, which limited the range of Chinese vessels.

Needham's Science and Civilisation in China provided some descriptions of the large junk ship during the Song dynasty. Chin scholar in 1190 described the ships in the form of a poem:

"Through the streets carts and horses are rumbling and thronging-We are back in a year of the Hsüan-Ho reign-period. One day a Han-Lin scholar presented this painting, Worthy of handing down the ways and works of a peaceful time. Going east from the Water-gate one comes to the Canal of the Sui, The streets and the fields are alike incomparable (But Lao Tzu formerly warned against prosperity And today we know it has all become waste-land). Yet the vessels that sail ten thousand li on their voyages. With rudders of timber from Chhu and their masts from Wu, Fine scenery north of the bridge and south of the bridge, Recall for a time the dream of halcyon days, One can hear the flutes and drums; the towers seem close at hand."

A decade before, in 1178, the Guangzhou customs officer Zhou Qufei wrote in Lingwai Daida about the sea-going ships of Southern China again:

"The ships which sail the southern sea and south of it are like giant houses. When their sails are spread they are like great clouds in the sky. Their rudders are several tens of feet long. A single ship carries several hundred men, and has in the stores a year's supply of grain. Pigs are fed and wine is fermented on board. There is no account of dead or living, no going back to the mainland when once the people have set forth upon the cerulean sea. At daybreak, when the gong sounds aboard the ship, the animals can drink their fill, and crew and passengers alike forget all dangers. To those on board, everything is hidden and lost in space, mountains, landmarks, and the countries of foreigners. The shipmaster may say "To make such and such a country, with a favorable wind, in so many days, we should sight such and such a mountain, (then) the ship must steer in such and such a direction". But suddenly the wind may fall, and may not be strong enough to allow for the sighting of the mountain on the given day; in such a case, bearings may have to be changed. And the ship (on the other hand) may be carried far beyond (the landmark) and may lose its bearings. A gale may spring up, the ship may be blown hither and thither, it may meet with shoals or be driven upon hidden rocks, then it may be broken to the very roofs (of its deckhouses). A great ship with heavy cargo has nothing to fear from the high seas, but rather in shallow water it will come to grief."

In 1274 CE, according to a resident of Hangzhou, the large Song junks were of 5,000 liao, around 71.1 m (233 ft), and could fit up to 600 passengers; the middle sized ships were between 1,000- 2,000 liao and could carry up to 300 passengers. Smaller ships were known as "wind-piercing" and carried up to a hundred passengers. However, historical descriptions (often second-hand) in early Chinese sources tend to greatly exaggerate dimensions, usually to twice or more of the actual lengths. Shipwrecks of large junks of the period, the Nanhai one and Quanzhou ship, measured 30.4 m (100 ft) and 34.6 metres (114 ft) in length, respectively.

=== Yuan dynasty (14th century) ===
The Mongol Yuan dynasty initially lifted the 9-month restriction on maritime shipping at around 1279, resulting in Chinese trade ships displacing Southeast Asian ships in their traditional Indian Ocean routes. But by 1284, the Yuan court revoked the private trade policy of the Song dynasty, and much of the Chinese maritime trade during this period was monopolized by the state via ortogh partnerships. Most trade expeditions were controlled by foreign merchants, mainly Muslims living in trading cities in southern China, partnered with government officials and the Mongol imperial family. This ban on private trade was intermittently lifted for brief periods until 1323, when it was lifted permanently until the overthrow of the Yuan.

Chinese ships were also described by Western travelers to the east, such as Ibn Battuta. According to Ibn Battuta, who visited China in 1347:

…We stopped in the port of Calicut, in which there were at the time thirteen Chinese vessels, and disembarked. On the China Sea traveling is done in Chinese ships only, so we shall describe their arrangements. The Chinese vessels are of three kinds; large ships called chunks (junks), middle sized ones called zaws (dhows) [sic] and the small ones kakams. The large ships have anything from twelve down to three sails, which are made of bamboo rods plaited into mats. They are never lowered, but turned according to the direction of the wind; at anchor they are left floating in the wind. A ship carries a complement of a thousand men, six hundred of whom are sailors and four hundred men-at-arms, including archers, men with shields and crossbows, who throw naphtha. Three smaller ones, the "half", the "third" and the "quarter", accompany each large vessel. These vessels are built in the towns of Zaytun (Quanzhou) and Sin-Kalan (Guangzhou). The vessel has four decks and contains rooms, cabins, and saloons for merchants; a cabin has chambers and a lavatory, and can be locked by its occupants. This is the manner after which they are made; two (parallel) walls of very thick wooden (planking) are raised and across the space between them are placed very thick planks (the bulkheads) secured longitudinally and transversely by means of large nails, each three ells in length. When these walls have thus been built the lower deck is fitted in and the ship is launched before the upper works are finished.
—Ibn Battuta

Yuan dynasty ships carry on the tradition of Song; the Yuan navy is essentially Song navy. Both Song and Yuan employed large trading junks. Unlike Ming treasure ships, Song and Yuan great junks are propelled by oars, and have with them smaller junks, probably for maneuvering aids. The largest junks (5,000 liao) may have a hull length twice that of Quanzhou ship (1,000 liao), that is 68 metres (223.1 ft). However, the norm size for trading junks pre-1500 was most likely around 20–30 metres (65.6–98.4 ft) long, with the length of 30 metres (98.4 ft) only becoming the norm after 1500 CE. Large size could be a disadvantage for shallow harbors and many reefs of Southeast Asia.

The ships of the previous Song, both mercantile and military, became the backbone of the Yuan navy. In particular the failed Mongol invasions of Japan (1274–1281), as well as the failed Mongol invasion of Java (1293), essentially relied on recently acquired Song naval capabilities. Worcester estimates that the large Yuan junks were 36 feet (10.97 m) in width and over 100 feet (30.48 m) long. In general, they had no keel, stempost, or sternpost. They did have centreboards, and a watertight bulkhead to strengthen the hull, which added great weight. This type of vessel may have been common in the 13th century. The kind of ships the Mongols used for the invasion wasn't recorded but it was large as they commissioned smaller boats for rivers of Java. David Bade estimated between 20 and 50 soldiers each on 400–500 ships with their supplies, weapons and diplomats during the Java campaign, while John Man estimated around 29–44 soldiers each.

=== Ming dynasty (15th–17th century) ===
==== Expedition of Zheng He ====
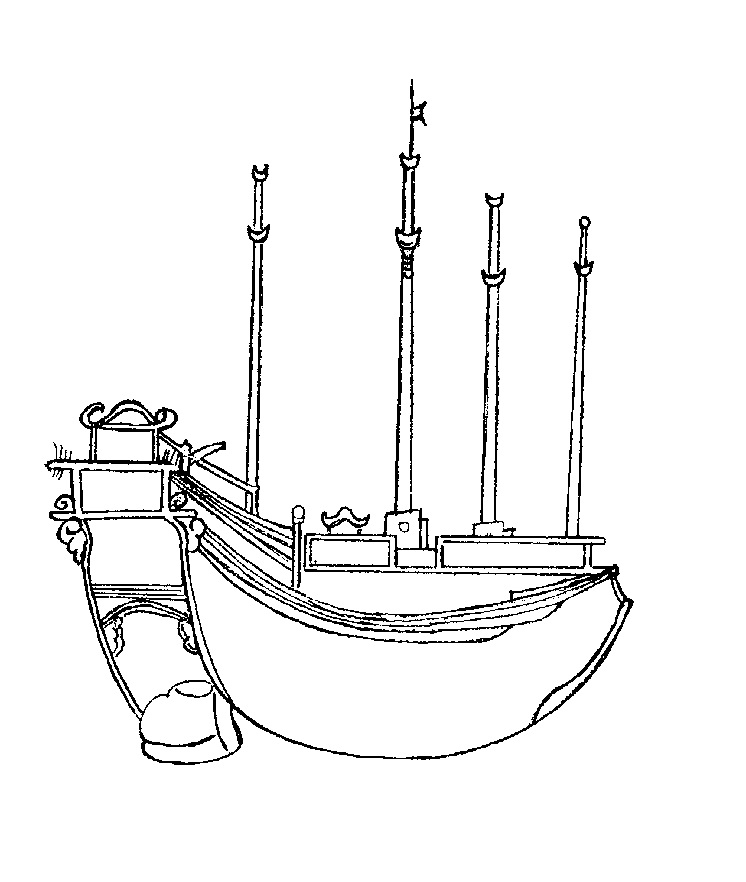
A large four masted junk from Longjiang Shipyard, c. 1553

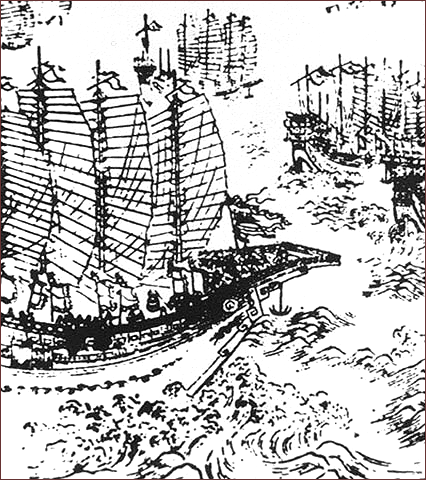
Chinese woodblock print of Zheng He ships from early 1600s

The largest junks ever built were possibly those of Admiral Zheng He, for his expeditions in the Indian Ocean (1405 to 1433), although this is disputed as no contemporary records of the sizes of Zheng He's ships are known. Instead the dimensions are based on Sanbao Taijian Xia Xiyang Ji Tongsu Yanyi (Eunuch Sanbao Western Records Popular Romance, published 1597), a romanticized version of the voyages written by Luo Maodeng nearly two centuries later. Maodeng's novel describes Zheng He's ships as follows:

- "Treasure ships" (寶船; Bǎo Chuán) nine-masted, 44.4 by 18 zhang, about 127 metres (417 feet) long and 52 metres (171 feet) wide.
- Equine ships (馬船; Mǎ Chuán), carrying horses and tribute goods and repair material for the fleet, eight-masted, 37 by 15 zhang, about 103 m (338 ft) long and 42 m (138 ft) wide.
- Supply ships (糧船; Liáng Chuán), containing staple for the crew, seven-masted, 28 by 12 zhang, about 78 m (256 ft) long and 35 m (115 ft) wide.
- Transport ships (坐船; Zuò Chuán), six-masted, 24 by 9.4 zhang, about 67 m (220 ft) long and 25 m (82 ft) wide.
- Warships (戰船; Zhàn Chuán), five-masted, 18 by 6.8 zhang, about 50 m (160 ft) long.

Louise Levathes suggests that the actual length of the biggest treasure ships may have been between 390–408 feet (119–124 m) long and 160–166 feet (49–51 m) wide. Modern scholars have argued on engineering grounds that it is highly unlikely that Zheng He's ship was 450 ft in length, Guan Jincheng (1947) proposed a much more modest size of 20 zhang long by 2.4 zhang wide (204 ft by 25.5 ft or 62.2 m by 7.8 m) while Xin Yuan'ou (2002) put them as 61–76 m (200–250 feet) in length. Zhao Zhigang claimed that he has solved the debate of the size difference, and stated that Zheng He's largest ship was about 70 m (230 ft) in length.

Comparing to other Ming records, the Chinese seem to have exaggerated their dimensions. European East Indiamen and galleons were said to be 30, 40, 50, and 60 zhang (90, 120, 150, and 180 m) in length. It was not until the mid to late 19th century that the length of the largest western wooden ship began to exceed 100 meters, even this was done using modern industrial tools and iron parts.

==== International Commerce ====
In Livro de Duarte Barbosa (c. 1516), the Portuguese writer Duarte Barbosa described the Chinese as "great navigators in very large ships which they call jungos, of two masts, of a different make from ours, the sails are of matting, and so also the cordage. There are great corsairs and robbers amongst those islands and ports of China. They go with all these goods to Malacca, where they also carry much iron, saltpetre and many other things, and for the return voyage they ship there Sumatra and Malabar pepper, of which they use a great deal in China, and drugs of Cambay, much anfiam, which we call opium, and wormwood, Levant gall nuts, saffron, coral wrought and unwrought, stuffs from Cambay, Palecate, and Bengal, vermilion, quicksilver, scarlet cloth, and many other things... Many of these Chinese take their wives and children continually on the ships in which they live without possessing any other dwellings."

==== Sea ban ====
Private trade was banned in 1371 by the Hongwu Emperor, though official state-sponsored trade under the guise of "tribute" missions continued. The ban on private trade was lifted in 1405 during the Zheng He expeditions, but reinstated again in 1479. From the mid-15th to early 16th century, all Chinese maritime trading was banned under the Ming dynasty in what were known as the hai jin laws. The Zheng He expeditions had drained imperial funds and there was increasing threat of invasion from the north, leading the Xuande Emperor to order the immediate cessation of all overseas exploration. The shipping and shipbuilding knowledge acquired during the Song and Yuan dynasties gradually declined during this period.

=== Capture of Taiwan ===
In 1661, a naval fleet of 400 junks and 25,000 men led by the Ming loyalist Koxinga (pinyin: Zhèng Chénggōng; Wade–Giles: Chêng⁴ Chʻêng²-kung¹), arrived in Taiwan to oust the Dutch from Zeelandia. Following a nine-month siege, Cheng captured the Dutch fortress Fort Zeelandia. A peace treaty between Koxinga and the Dutch Government was signed at Castle Zeelandia on February 1, 1662, and Taiwan became Koxinga's base for the Kingdom of Tungning.

=== Qing dynasty (17th–19th century) ===
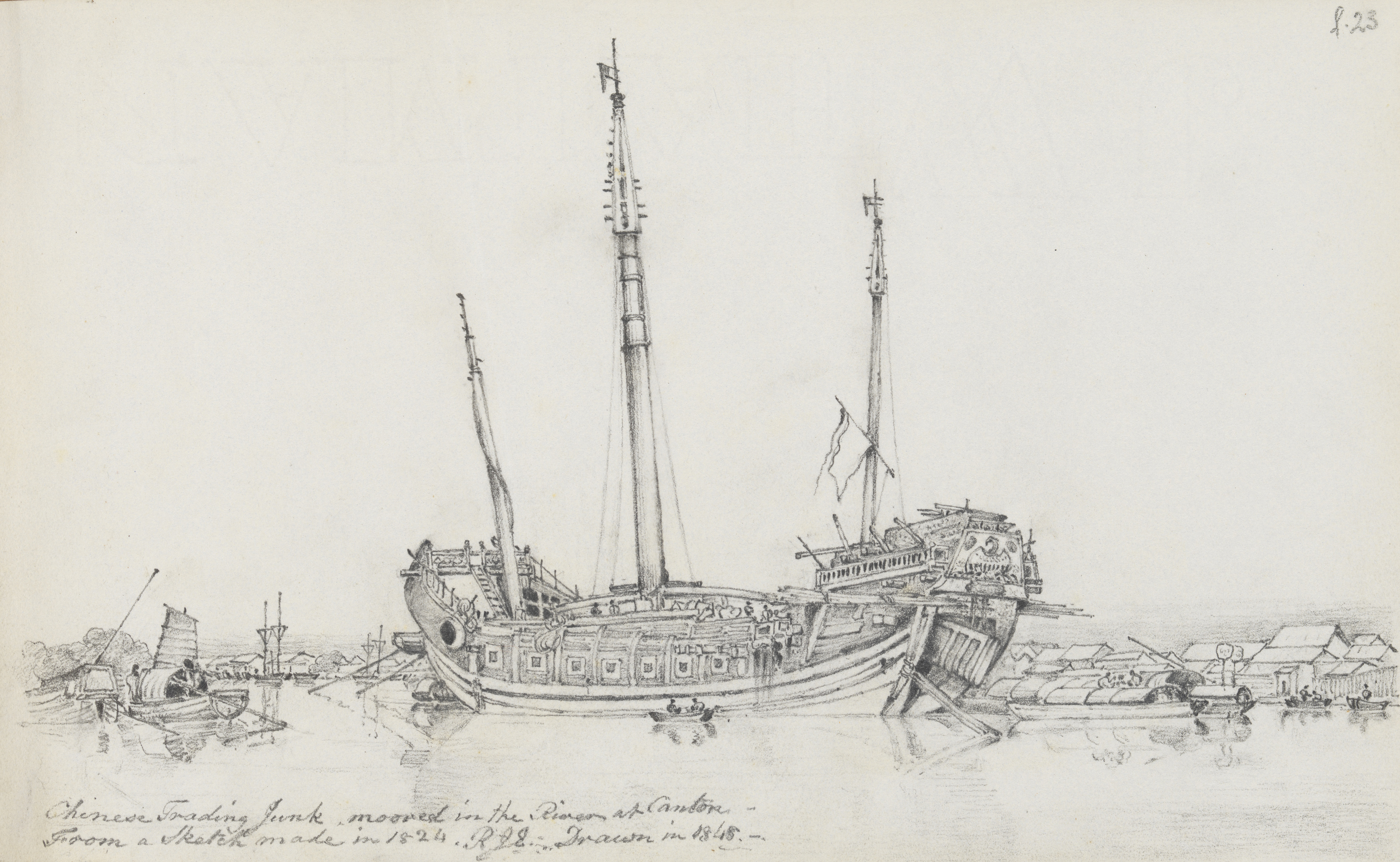
Chinese Trading Junk, Guangzhou, 1823

Large, ocean-going junks played a key role in Asian trade until the 19th century. One of these junks, Keying, sailed from China around the Cape of Good Hope to the United States and England between 1846 and 1848. Many junks were fitted out with carronades and other weapons for naval or piratical uses. These vessels were typically called "war junks" or "armed junks" by Western navies which began entering the region more frequently in the 18th century. The British, Americans and French fought several naval battles with war junks in the 19th century, during the First Opium War, Second Opium War and in between.

At sea, junk sailors co-operated with their Western counterparts. For example, in 1870 survivors of the English barque Humberstone shipwrecked off Formosa, were rescued by a junk and landed safely in Macao.

=== Modern period (20th century) ===
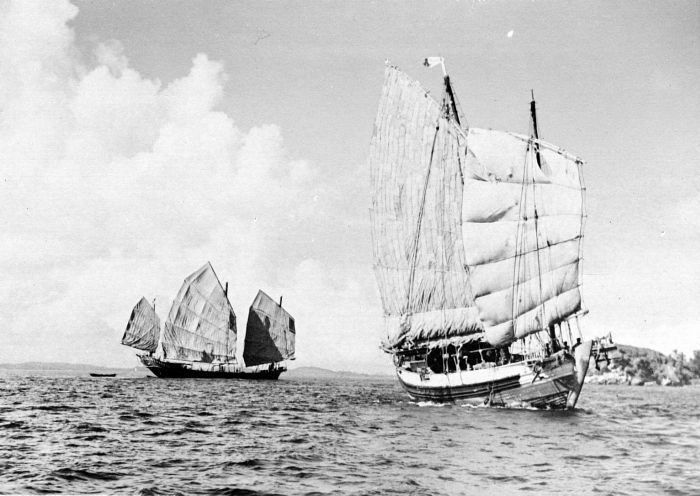
A junk Sin Tong Heng and a lorcha Tek Hwa Seng in the Dutch East Indies (1936)

In 1938, E. Allen Petersen escaped the advancing Japanese armies by sailing a 36-foot (11 m) junk, Hummel Hummel, from Shanghai to California with his wife Tani and two White Russians (Tsar loyalists).

In 1955, six young men sailed a Ming dynasty-style junk from Taiwan to San Francisco. The four-month journey aboard the Free China was captured on film and their arrival into San Francisco made international front-page news. The five Chinese-born friends saw an advertisement for an international trans-Atlantic yacht race, and jumped at the opportunity for adventure. They were joined by the then US Vice-Consul to China, who was tasked with capturing the journey on film. Enduring typhoons and mishaps, the crew, having never sailed a century-old junk before, learned along the way. The crew included Reno Chen, Paul Chow, Loo-chi Hu, Benny Hsu, Calvin Mehlert and were led by skipper Marco Chung. After a journey of 6,000 miles (9,700 km), the Free China and her crew arrived in San Francisco Bay in fog on August 8, 1955. Shortly afterward the footage was featured on ABC television's Bold Journey travelogue. Hosted by John Stephenson and narrated by ship's navigator Paul Chow, the program highlighted the adventures and challenges of the junk's sailing across the Pacific, as well as some humorous moments aboard ship.

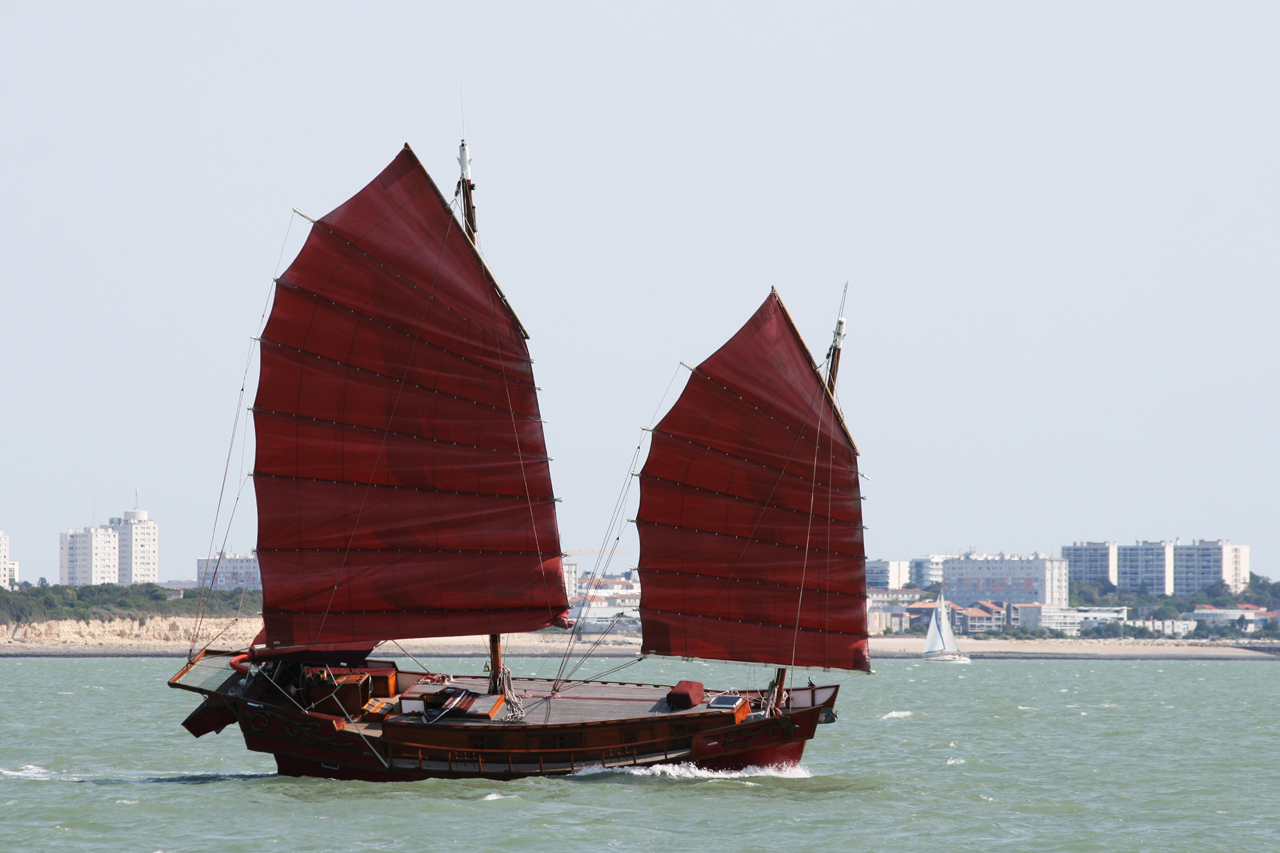
A modern junk in La Rochelle in 2009

In 1959 a group of Catalan men, led by Jose Maria Tey, sailed from Hong Kong to Barcelona on a junk named Rubia. After their successful journey this junk was anchored as a tourist attraction at one end of Barcelona harbor, close to where La Rambla meets the sea. Permanently moored along with it was a reproduction of Columbus' caravel Santa Maria during the 1960s and part of the 1970s.

In 1981, Christoph Swoboda had a 65 feet (LoA) Bedar built by the boatyard of Che Ali bin Ngah on Duyong island in the estuary of the Terengganu river on the east coast of Malaysia. The Bedar is one of the two types of Malay junk schooners traditionally built there. He sailed this junk with his family and one friend to the Mediterranean and then continued with changing crew to finally finish a circumnavigation in 1998. He sold this vessel in 2000 and in 2004 he started to build a new junk in Duyong with the same craftsmen, the Pinas (or Pinis) Naga Pelangi, in order to help keep this ancient boat building tradition alive. This boat finished to be fitted out in 2010 and is working as a charter boat in the Andaman and the South China Sea.

== See also ==
- Casco (barge), flat hulled barges of the Philippines
- Pinisi
- Lorcha
- Tongkang
- Keying, a Chinese junk that was sailed to the US in the 1840s
- Shipyards in Macau
- Junk rig
