= List of shipwrecks in the 14th century =

The list of shipwrecks in the 14th century includes some ships sunk, wrecked or otherwise lost between (and including) the years 1301 to 1400.

== 1301–1310 ==
1301

- Unidentified: A ship out of Calais with cloth was wrecked at Compton Bay, Isle of Wight. Some of the cargo was salvaged.

1301 or 1302

- The mast of a wreck off Rame Head, Cornwall was sold for four shillings.
- Wreckage washed up within the tithing of Trelan suggesting a wreck in the area of Black Head, on the Lizard peninsula.

1304

- 10 February – Le Halop of St John (France): Three ships (two from the port of Bayonne) out of Flanders wrecked and driven ashore at Romenhale, Kent. Goods to the value of £10,000 stolen.
- 8 April – Mariote (England): The Portsmouth ship was carrying five bushells of wheat from the Kings Manors on the Isle of Wight to Berwick-upon-Tweed when she was wrecked near Newport, Isle of Wight.

1305

- (first report) – an unnamed sailing vessel: Wrecked on Tresco, Isles of Scilly. The coroner, William le Poer, was on the island to take charge of the salvaged cargo and was "seized by the mob" led by Randulph de Blancminster, Lord of the Manor, and imprisoned until he was able to purchase his freedom.
- (first report) – an unidentified sailing vessel: Driven on land near the Isle of Portland by a "tempest", the crew escaped but the Spanish ship was cut to pieces and the goods carried away by Henry Blake and 260 others.

1306

- 23 April (first report) – Le Cristofre (England): The Yarmouth ship was wrecked at St Alban's Head while en route from Bordeaux to London with wine.
- (first report) an unidentified French sailing vessel: Driven ashore at St Alban's Head. Some crew and two dogs escaped alive and the people carried away the goods, destroying the ship.

1307

- 5 May (first report) – La Maudeleyne (Spain): The Spanish cargo ship was stranded on the south Cornish coast, possibly in Mount's Bay. All her crew were saved and much of the cargo was salvaged. Scheduled monument no. 1448520.

1309

- 16 November – Unidentified (Spain): Carrying a general cargo and iron from her home port of Castille to England, she was wrecked near Newport, Isle of Wight. Much of her cargo was taken by local men.

== 1311–1320 ==
1311

- unknown date (first report) – St Goymelote: She was boarded, her cables cut and driven ashore; her cargo of wine being carried off by the transgressors on Portland Peninsula.

1313

- 12 April – Blessed Mary (Duchy of Aquitaine): The Bayonne ship was wrecked at St Catherine's Point, Isle of Wight while en route from Tonnay to Picardy. She was carrying 174 tuns of white wine and many casks were stolen by local men.
- 28 November – St Mary of Fontarobia (Portugal): En route to Portugal from Flanders, she grounded on a sandbank near Dungeness. Her cargo was stolen.

1314

- 1 April (first report) – Shoreham ( Kingdom of England): Chepstow registered sailing vessel on voyage, in ballast, to Poitou, wrecked in Widemouth Bay, north Cornwall. Forty-two pounds was found in a chest.

1318

- 8 February (first report) – unidentified sailing vessel: While on voyage from Portugal to Flanders the ship was "... cast away when anchored by contrary winds in Padistowe". Men and cargo (including wine) saved.

== 1321–1330 ==
1321

- 30 April (first report) St Bartholomew ( Bilbao): Lost near Lizard Point, Cornwall while heading for La Seyne along with her cargo (including jewels) worth £6,000.
- (first report) an unidentified ship: Stranded and a total loss at Clovelly, north Devon.

1322

- (first report) unnamed ship: The ship, en route to Sutton, was attacked by Portlanders and people of Waymere, who scuttled the ship, off the Portland peninsula, and took her cargo of cloth, iron, linen and wax.

c.1323

- Shinan ship: A Chinese ship sinks in the Yellow Sea off the coast of the Korean peninsula.

== 1331–1340 ==
1340

- 3 March (first report) an Irish vessel: Wrecked on the Cornish coast at "Porthlyn" and broken up by men from St Perran and St Carantoc. Although a scheduled monument the exact location is unknown, but is likely to be in, or near, Perran Sands or Crantock.

== 1341–1350 ==
1342

- 18 August Siege of Brest: Eleven galleys (Genoa) were burnt at Brest, France by a fleet of 260 English ships (Royal Navy).
- (first report) La Trinite of Fowey (England): In a case brought before Edward III, the ship was boarded by Nicholas de Beer of Marhamchurch while anchored in the port of Widemouth. The cables and cords were cut and she was driven ashore by the tide and broke up with goods to the value of £300 owned by John de Lym and Henry Bote lost.

1343

- 10 February (first report) Tarite (Spain or France): Sailing vessel wrecked on the south coast of Cornwall while heading for Falmouth. Cargo valued at £3,000. Scheduled monument no. 1189787
- 28 November Custance (England): A Dartmouth ship wrecked at the mouth of the Thames while nearing London from Bordeaux with wine and a general cargo. All the crew escaped.

1345

- 4 October Unidentified: A ship anchored between the towns of Gravene and Leiston, Kent was boarded and had their cargo and ship's gear taken away. The men raised the anchor and the ship was lost near the Long Sand, at the mouth of the Thames.

1350

- 29 August Battle of Winchelsea: Cog Thomas (England). The cog was sunk during the battle.

== 1351–1360 ==
1353

- 24 October Unidentified: Driven ashore and broken up near Romney during a storm. Part of the cargo was stolen or salvaged.
- 24 October Unidentified: Driven ashore near Dungeness in a storm while en route to London from Flanders. Her cargo of cloth was taken.

== 1361–1370 ==
1362

- (first report) Tarrit: Stranded and a total loss near Plymouth.

1366

- (first report) La Michel: Driven ashore, near Weymouth, by the violence of the sea while on passage to Aquitaine. Her goods were taken by the Dorset "malefactors".

== 1371–1380 ==
1371

- (first report) Welfare: Wrecked on the Kimmeridge Ledges, St Alban's Head, Dorset while on voyage from her home port of Dartmouth, Devon to London. Many men were convicted for robbery including Thomas, the abbot of Cerne Abbas (who stored some of the cargo near Kimmeridge Manor), one of the monks and the "landed gentry" of Purbeck. The cargo consisted of thirty-two pieces of cloth of gold, bales of richly embroidered silk and other merchandise.

== 1381–1390 ==
1382

- Saint Marie De Marceau (Portugal): possibly plundered by local people in Mount's Bay, Cornwall sometime between 29 November and early December. The captain was captured and forced to sign over the ship and contents which was worth 600 marks.

== 1391–1400 ==
1393

- Unnamed cargo ship: Following an order dated 22 February 1393, an inquest was held in Penzance, Cornwall on 18 March 1393 regarding the whereabouts of merchandise from a ship wrecked in Mount's Bay at Mousehole during a storm.

1394

- Gabrielle (Milford Haven): Wrecked on the Wolf Rock, between Cornwall and the Isles of Scilly; her cargo, worth £1,000, was washed ashore in Cornwall.

== Unknown year ==
1390s or earlier

- Unnamed cargo ship: A cargo vessel (or vessels) carrying goods of great value have been wrecked on the Cornish coast. A Commission was set up to enquire about the cargo of shipwrecks being removed and concealed from the king.
- Unnamed ship: The hull of a 50-ton, 30-foot (9.1 m) clinker-built boat of oak, was found imbedded in a beach near Newlyn, Cornwall in January 1840. A coin, with the inscription Ave Maria which resembles those of the 14th century, was one of two found on board.
