= Maritime Silk Route Museum =

Museum in Guangdong, China

Coordinates: 21.6329°N 111.9384°E

- 廣東海上絲綢之路博物館
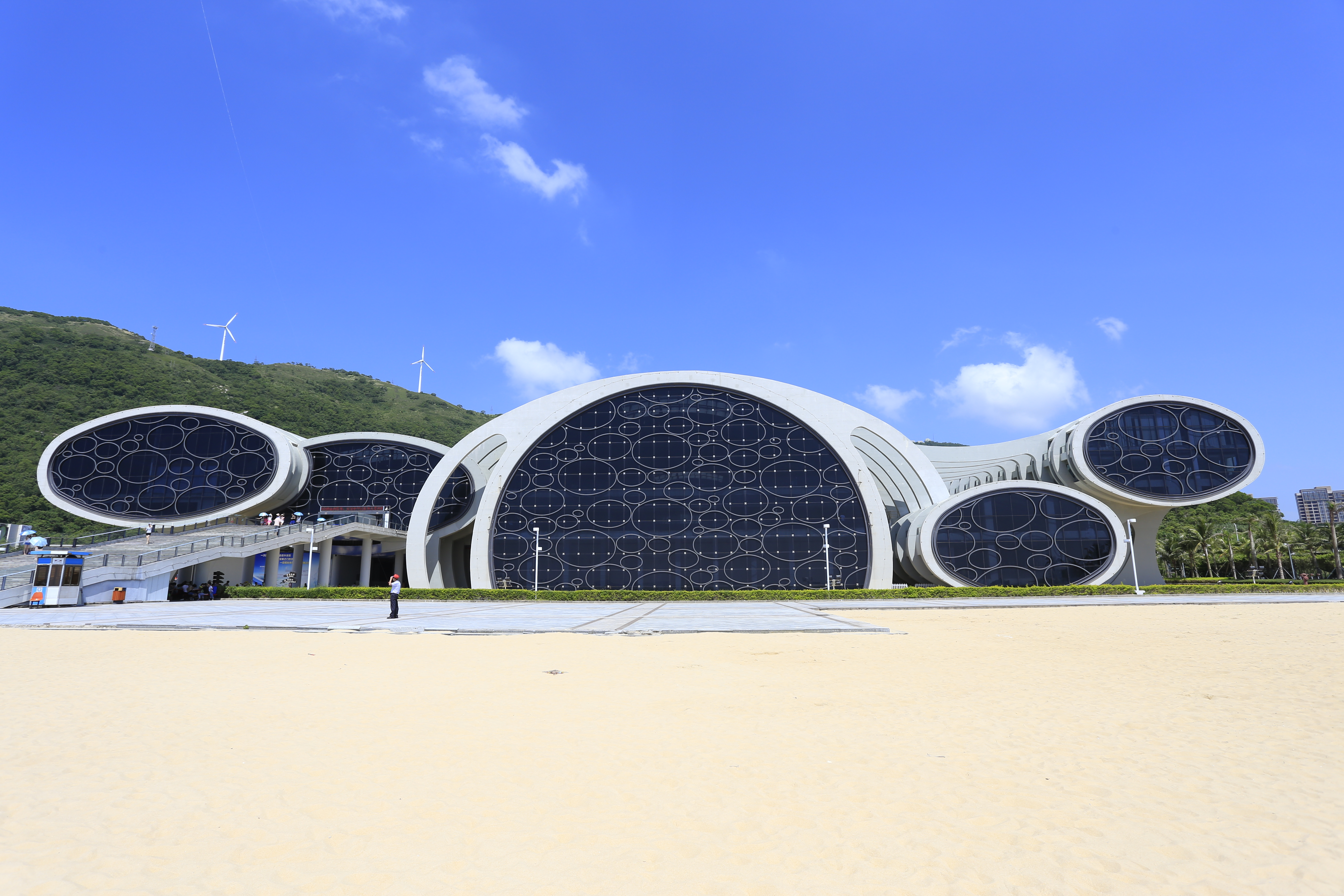
- Established: 24 December 2009
- Location: Hailing Island, Jiangcheng, Yangjiang, Guangdong, China
- Type: Maritime museum
- Key holdings: Nanhai One

The Maritime Silk Route Museum (Chinese: 海上丝绸之路博物馆) is the name of a museum on Hailing Island, Yangjiang, Guangdong Province, China. Work on the museum started in late 2004 and the museum opened to the public on 24 December 2009.

The museum was built to hold 300,000 artifacts as well as having the facilities necessary to house pieces of shipwrecks in water tanks. The main exhibition is the Nanhai 1 shipwreck, a wooden vessel which sank just off Hailing Island at the end of the 10th century. The Nanhai 1 is housed in the Crystal Palace in a water tank, one of main features for the museum which is the only museum in Asia with these facilities for underwater display. The museum also has 200 artifacts on display from the wreck.

== See also ==
- Golden Banana
- Indo-Pacific
- International North–South Transport Corridor
- List of the largest trading partners of China
- Maritime Silk Road
- Suez Canal
