= Quanzhou Maritime Museum =

Museum in Quanzhou, China

Coordinates: 24.91023°N 118.61135°E

- 泉州海外交通史博物馆
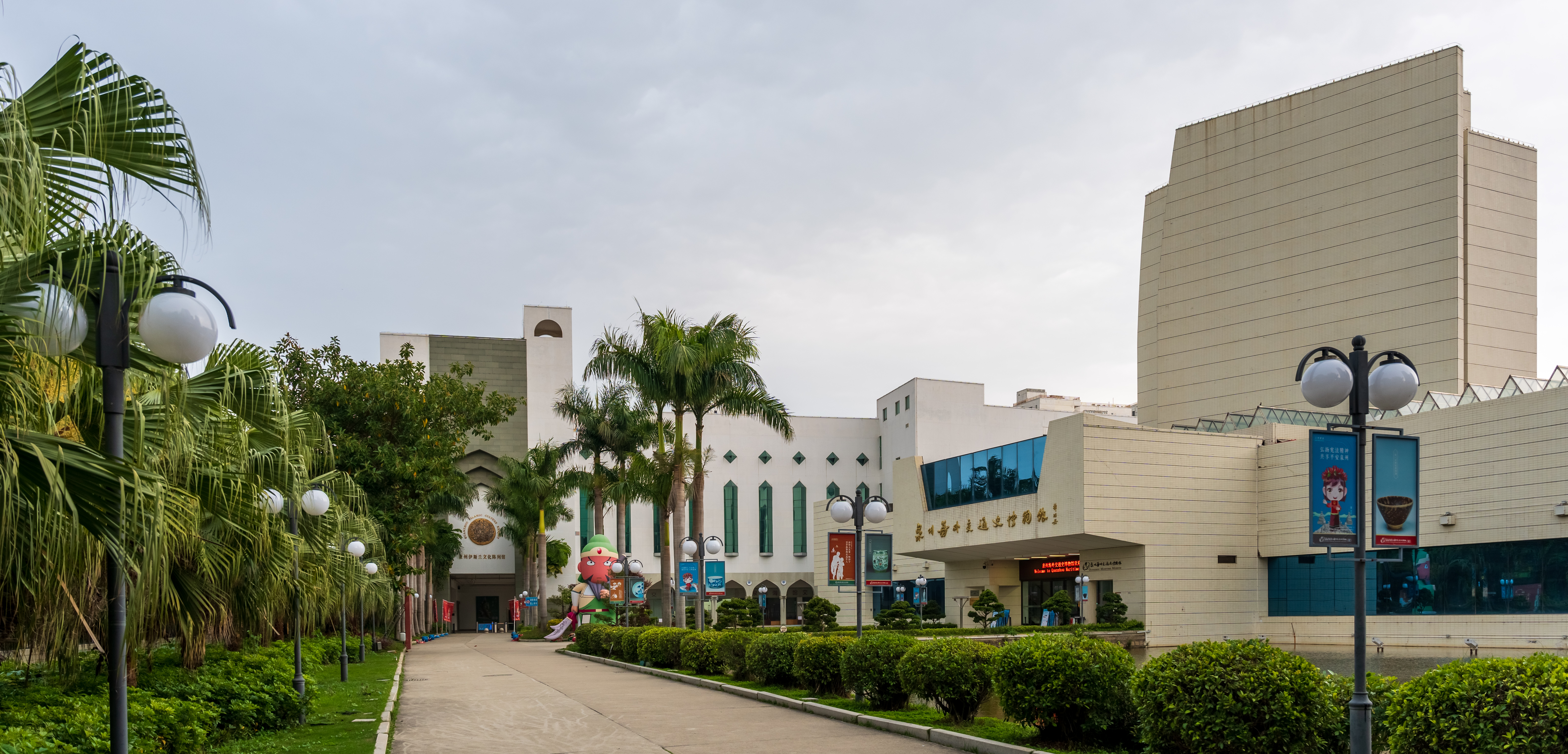
- Established: 1959
- Location: Quanzhou, Fujian, China
- Website: qzhjg.cn (in Chinese)

Quanzhou Maritime Museum
- Traditional Chinese: 泉州海外交通史博物館
- Simplified Chinese: 泉州海外交通史博物馆
Transcriptions
Standard Mandarin
- Hanyu Pinyin: Quánzhōu Hǎiwài Jiāotōngshǐ Bówùguǎn
Southern Min
- Hokkien POJ: Choâⁿ-chiu Hái-gōa Kau-thong-sú Phok-bu̍t-kòan

The Quanzhou Maritime Museum (Chinese: 泉州海外交通史博物馆) in the Fengze District of Quanzhou, Fujian, is the only museum in China specialising in overseas relations. Established in 1959, through its comprehensive and valuable display of historical relics relating to overseas transportation, the museum reflects the development history of the major Eastern port of the Middle Ages—Citong or Zaytun (刺桐). It also showcases the important role that Quanzhou played in economic and cultural exchanges with foreign countries.

== Introduction ==
The museum consists of an old and a new section. The old section, housed in a purpose-built exhibition hall on the grounds of the Kaiyuan Temple, is used for exhibiting ancient boats. The new section, completed in 1991 and located near the scenic East Lake Park (东湖公园), resembles a large sailing ship afloat on the sea. It covers an area of 3,000 square metres (32,000 sq ft) with a built-up area of up to 7,300 square metres (79,000 sq ft). There are four exhibition halls in the new section named "Quanzhou Maritime Exhibition Hall" (泉州海外交通史陈列馆), "Quanzhou Religious Stone Carving Hall" (泉州宗教石刻馆), "Quanzhou Ethnic Culture Exhibition Hall" (泉州民族文化陈列馆) and "Ancient Chinese Model Hall" (中国古代船模馆).

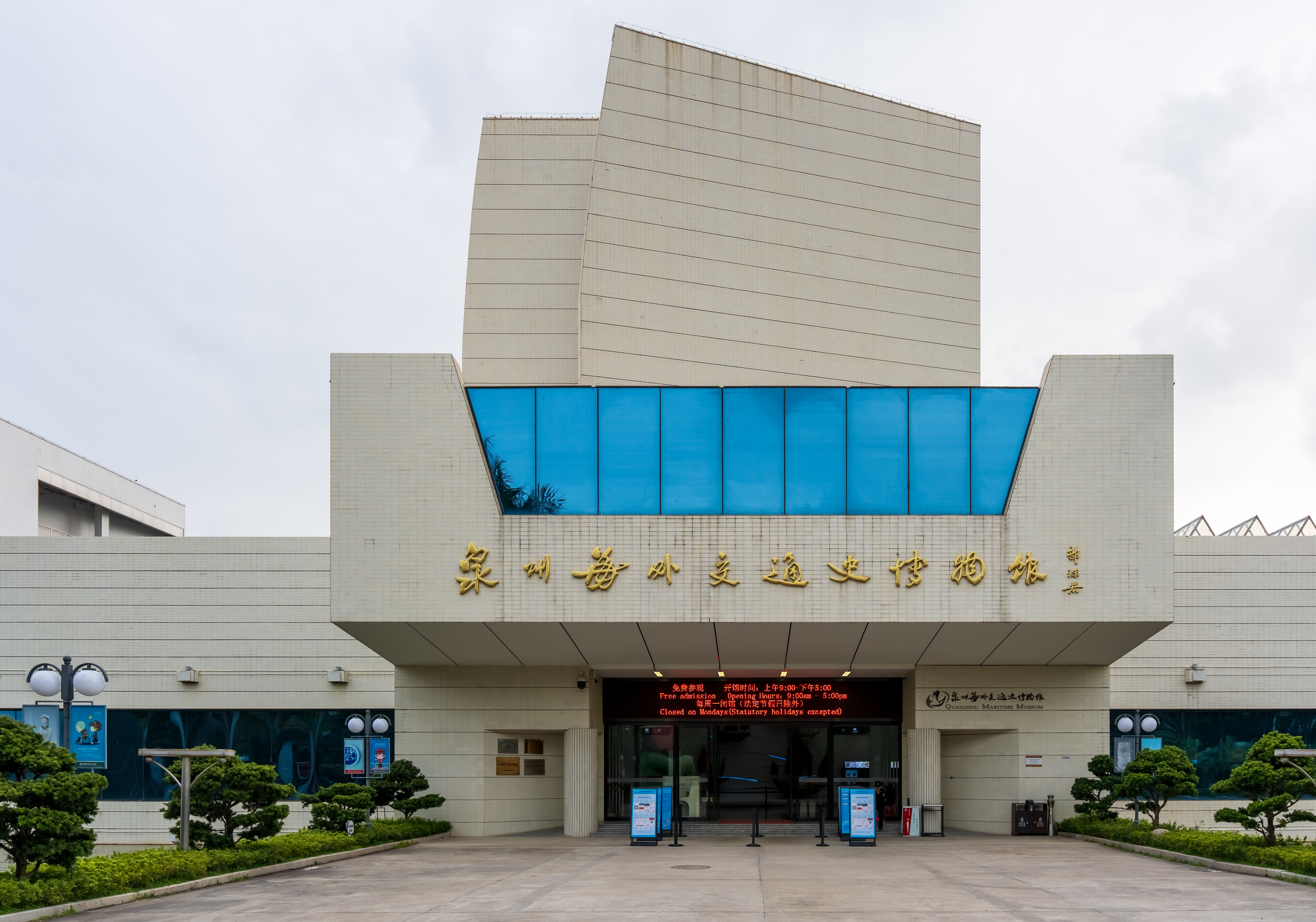
The Entrance

== Rare collections ==
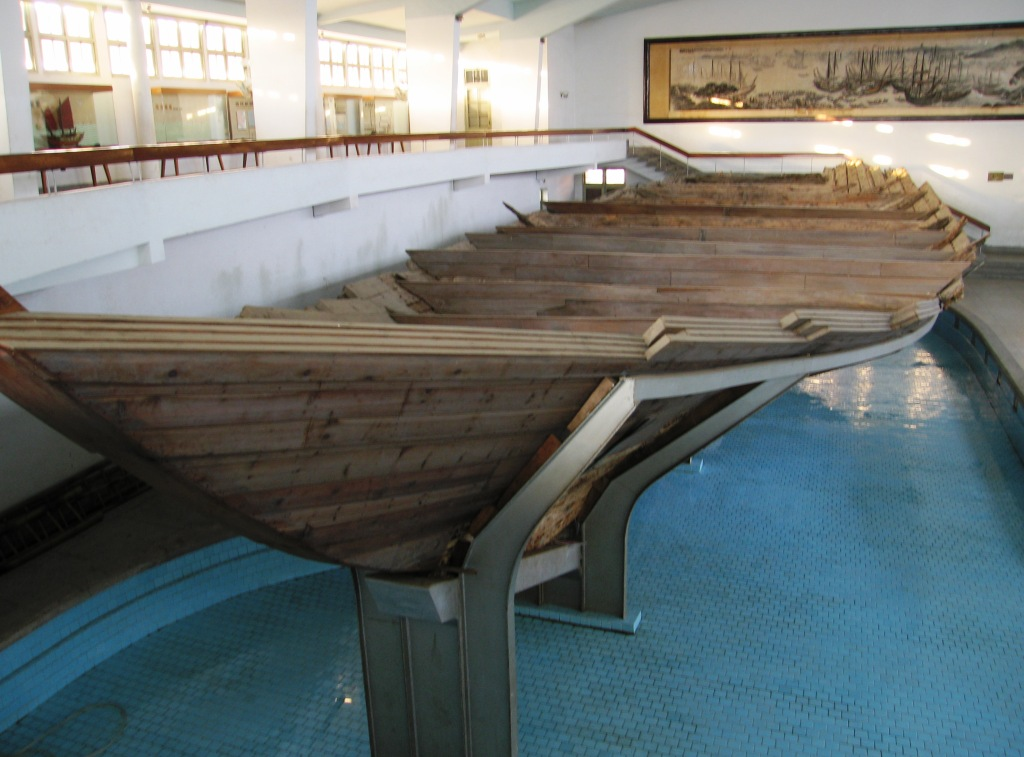
The Quanzhou ship being housed in the Quanzhou Maritime Museum

Among the exhibits of particular interest are:

- The Quanzhou ship: A Song dynasty (960–1279) ship unearthed in 1974.
- Stone stelae and tombstones with religious inscriptions. Besides Buddhist ones, there are Islamic, Christian, and Hindu specimens.
- Export ceramics: the Dehua porcelain is of particular value.
- Ancient navigation equipment: such as a four-claw anchor (四爪铁锚) dating to the Ming dynasty (1368–1644)

== See also ==
- List of museums in China
