= Quanzhou ship =

13th-century Chinese sailing junk

Coordinates: 24°55′N 118°35′E

The Quanzhou ship
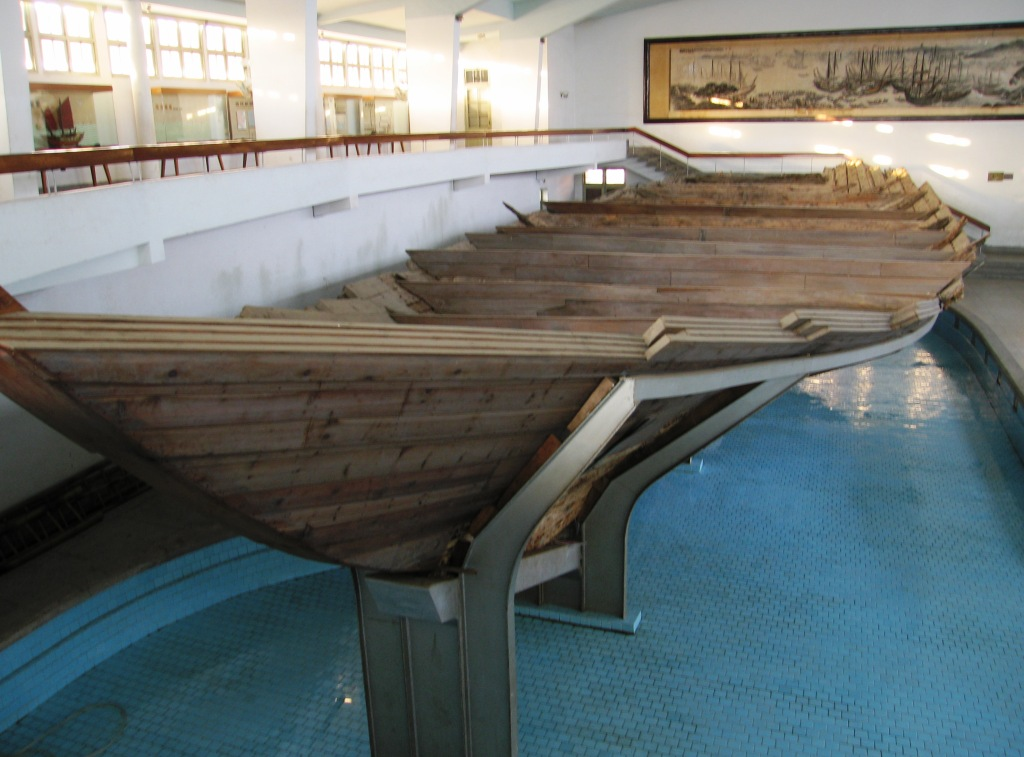
- The Quanzhou ship

History

Southern Song
- Fate: Sank c.1275
- Notes: Surviving part of the ship's hull exhibited in a museum

General characteristics
- Type: Junk
- Length: 34.6 m (114 ft)
- Beam: 9.82 m (32.2 ft)

"Quanzhou Ship" or "Quanzhou wreck"
- Traditional Chinese: 泉州灣古船
- Simplified Chinese: 泉州湾古船
Transcriptions
Southern Min
- Hokkien POJ: Choân-chiu-oân Kó͘-chûn
- Tâi-lô: Tsuân-tsiu-uân Koó-tsûn

The Quanzhou ship (泉州湾古船), or Quanzhou wreck, was a 13th-century Chinese seagoing sailing junk that sank near the city of Quanzhou in Fujian Province, and was discovered in 1973. It remains one of the most important marine archaeology finds in China, and is an important piece of physical evidence about the shipbuilding techniques of the Song dynasty and the international maritime trade of the period.

== Discovery ==
The Quanzhou ship was discovered in 1973 and excavated by Chinese archaeologists during the summer of 1974 from 2 to 3 metres (6 ft 7 in to 9 ft 10 in) of mud in the shore area of Quanzhou Bay. The excavation was led by the local archaeologist, professor of history at Xiamen University, Zhuang Weiji (庄为玑, 1909–1991).

It is thought that in the 13th century a shipping channel ran in that area. During the heyday of Quanzhou as one of China's major sea ports, the area corresponded to the ancient Houzhou Harbor (后渚港, Houzhougang; Hou-to in Wake (1997).

The parts of the ship located above the original waterline had perished, but the lower parts of the hull had been preserved fairly well in mud and water.

The main evidence for dating the vessel comes from 504 copper coins found inside the hull. Seventy of them date to the Song dynasty, with the most recent dating to 1272. Based on this, the archaeologists concluded that the ship must have sunk within a few years after 1272 - that is, during the very last years of the Southern Song dynasty (which fell to the Mongols in 1279), or perhaps already after the Mongol conquest of South China. Some archaeologists (John W. Chafee, Janice Stargardt) conjecture that the peculiar circumstances of the ship's sinking may indicate that the vessel was scuttled by its own crew upon returning to Quanzhou from Southeast Asia, once they found out that the city had been captured by the Mongols. The captain may have intentionally chosen a place in shallow, sheltered waters to do so. There was apparently no loss of life as no human remains were found at the site, but all cargo appeared to stay on board. This may indicate that the crew intended to return to the site later to retrieve the valuable cargo, but failed to do so due to events beyond their control.

== Description ==
According to the archaeologists' study of the ship's remains, it was a three-masted ship, with the original length of 34.6 metres (114 ft) and width ("beam") of 9.82 metres (32.2 ft). The below-waterline part actually preserved was 24.02 metres (78.8 ft) long and 9.15 metres (30.0 ft) wide, and 2 metres (6 ft 7 in) deep. This is thought to be about an average size for a ship used in long-distance trade of its era.

The ship was divided by 12 bulkheads into 13 compartments.

The analysis of the construction techniques used in the ship demonstrates a mix of techniques and materials characteristic of both China coast and Southeast Asia. For example, seams between planks were sealed with a tree-derived resin known as chu-nam, which was commonly available e.g. in the port of Satingpra, near today's Songkhla in southern Thailand. This may indicate the existence of resident communities of Quanzhou traders in ports such as Satingpra.

== Cargo ==
According to archaeologists, the composition of the cargo found on board the ship indicates that it was a merchant vessel returning to Quanzhou from Southeast Asia. The number of coins found with the wreck (the total of 512, including 505 copper coins and 8 iron coins) was quite small compared to e.g. 29 tons of copper coins that were found with the Sinan wreck off the Korean coast; this is consistent with the merchants spending most of their money buying goods in Southeast Asia. There were 2001 cowrie shells aboard, which may have been obtained in SE Asia or Hainan.

The primary cargo of the ship was incense wood; around 2,400 kilograms (5,300 lb) of it was found in 12 out of the 13 compartments of the ship. There were also small amounts of various valuable commodities: five "Chinese liters" (sheng) of black peppers, ambergris (which, according to chemical testing, must have ultimately come from Somalia), 6.3 grams (0.22 oz) of frankincense (possibly from the Arab lands), almost 4 kilograms (8.8 lb) of mercury, a small amount of "dragon's blood" and haematite, and one turtle shell.

== Current state ==
The ship is presently preserved in the Quanzhou Maritime Museum, which has a special "Quanzhou Bay Ancient Ships Exhibit" dedicated to this vessel and several other vessels recovered in similar circumstances. The exhibit is located in a special pavilion on the grounds of Quanzhou's Kaiyuan Temple. The exhibit also includes a modern model of the ship as it must have looked like during its working life.

== See also ==
- Nanhai One, from Yangjiang, Guangdong
- Huaguangjiao One, from Paracel Islands (Xinsha Island) in the South China Sea
- Shinan ship, found near Korea
