= Huaguangjiao One =

Sunken Chinese merchant ship

Coordinates: 16°16′16″N 111°34′03″E

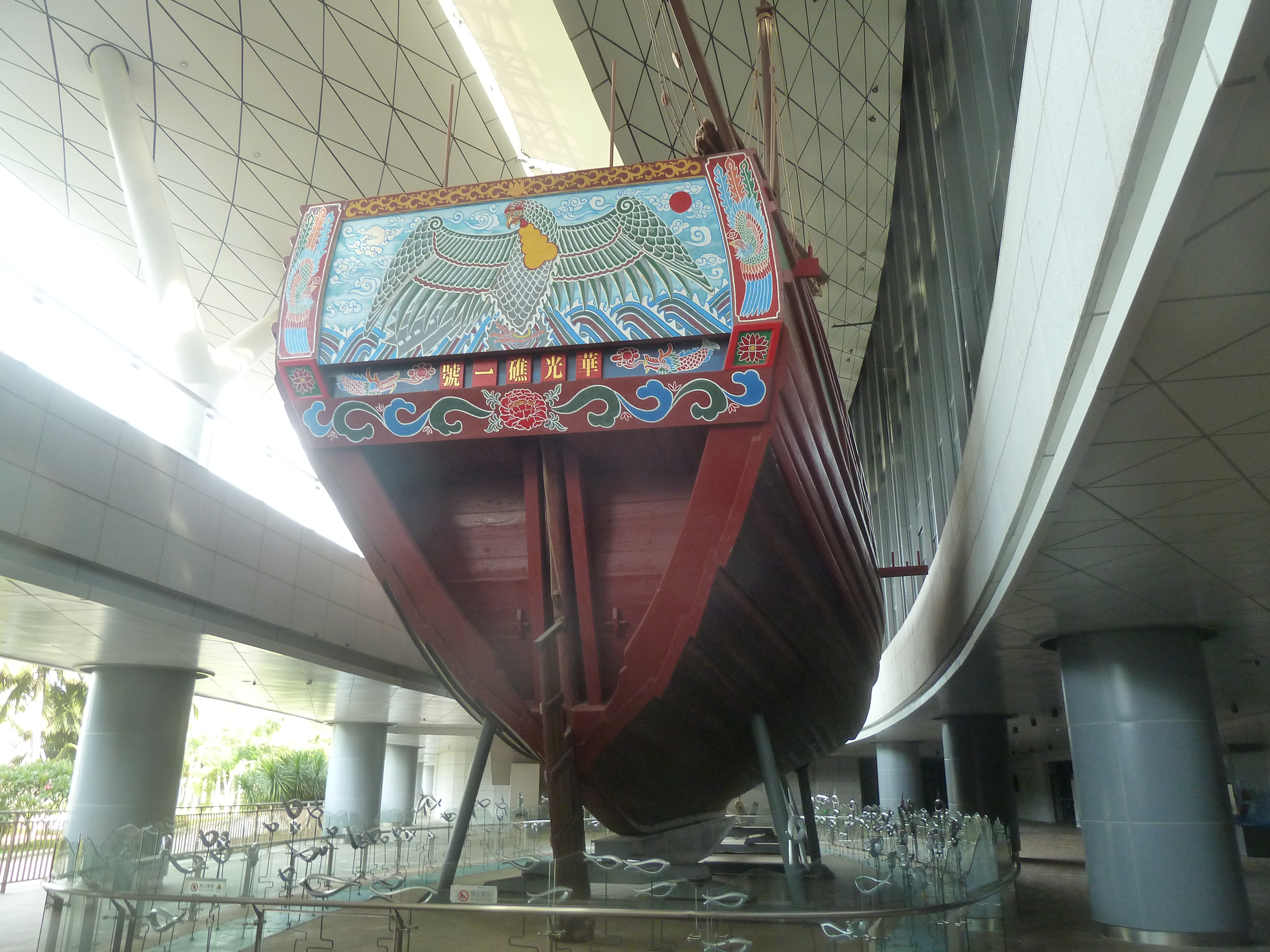
Replica of the Huaguangjiao One in the China (Hainan) Museum of the South China Sea in Qionghai, Hainan

Huaguangjiao One (Chinese: 华光礁一号) is a Chinese merchant ship, built during the Southern Song dynasty (1127–1279), that sank off the coast of the Paracel Islands (Xisha Islands) in the South China Sea. The ship is named after the reef where it was found, which translates literally as "Magnificent China Reef" and known as Discovery Reef in English. The wreck was discovered in 1996 and is currently the oldest hull that China has discovered in the open seas.

== Archeological findings ==
In 1996, a group of Chinese fishermen discovered a 20.0 m (66 ft), 6.0 m (20 ft) wide ship about three meters below the surface near the Huaguang Reef. The wreckage covered 180 square meters meaning that the ship would have had an estimated displacement capacity of 60 tons and 11 cabins.

On 15 March 2007, an archaeological salvaging operation was organized by the National Museum of China and the Hainan Provincial Administration of Culture, Radio & Television, Publishing and Sport, and the excavation of the shipwreck site at Huaguang Reef initiated. This operation not only helped the archaeologists involved in the survey locate nearly 10 other shipwrecks in the surrounding area, but also helped establish the first time that China conducted high-seas excavation work.

According to Dr. Zhang Wei, director of China's Underwater Research Center with the National Museum at the time of the discovery, even though the wreck had been robbed many times and severely damaged by looters, the retrieval of the more than 10,000 pieces of antique pottery and porcelain, which seems to have mainly come from the Fujian and Guangdong kilns, provide important information and evidence of an already well established maritime trade route, known as the Maritime Silk Road, between China and the rest of the world during the Song and Yuan dynasty (1280–1368).

== Artefacts ==
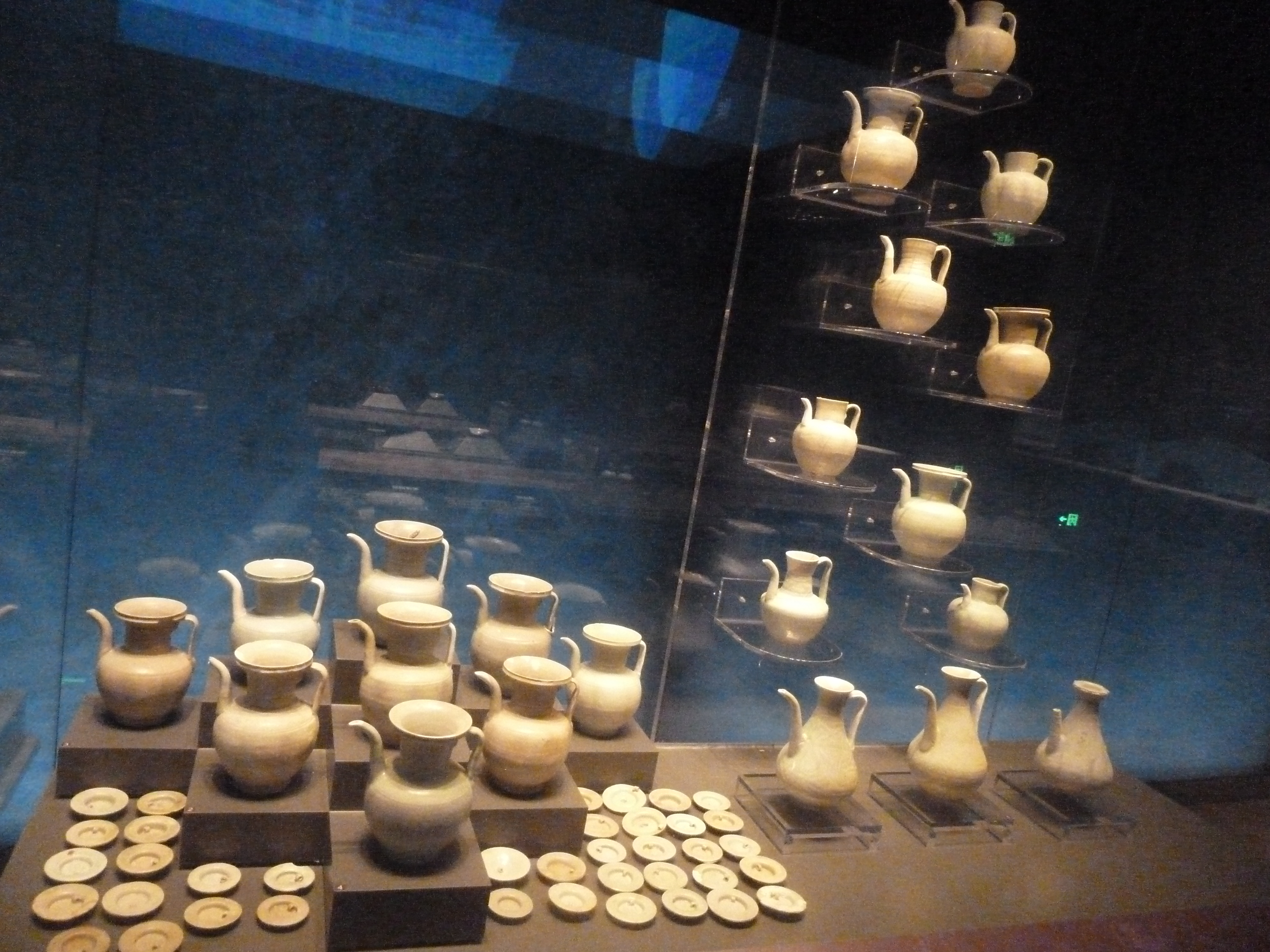
Ewers from the wreck

Many fragments of porcelain and pottery were collected at the site, mostly concentrated in an area of 38 square meters within the reef. Among the items recovered were some exquisite blue white porcelain yielded from the Jingdezhen factory, in Jiangxi province, shadowy blue porcelains, green glazed porcelain plates, pots and other rare antiques. Brown-glazed wares have also been found, indicating the possibility that they might be from an even earlier period in time.

Many of the items recovered at the archaeological site were later presented at a news conference in Haikou city, the capital of south China's Hainan province on 8 May 2007.

== See also ==
- Nanhai One, from Yangjiang, Guangdong
- Quanzhou ship, from Quanzhou, Fujian
- Shinan ship, from Shinan islands, Korea
- Maritime archaeology
