= Shinan ship =

14th-century Chinese seagoing ship

The Shinan ship
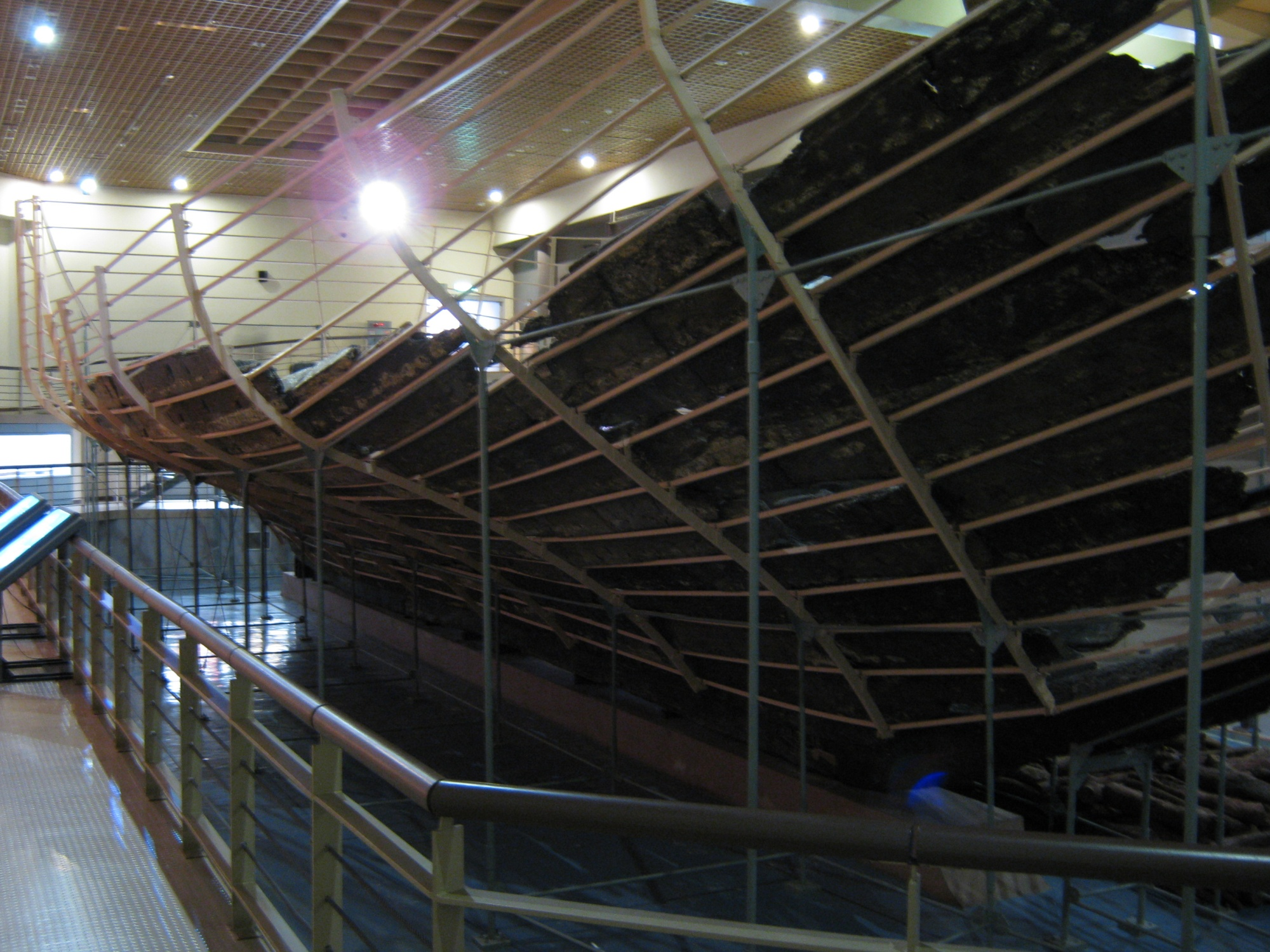
- Remains of the Shinan ship

History

Yuan China
- Name: Shinan ship
- Fate: Sank c. 1323
- Notes: Surviving part of the ship's hull exhibited in a museum

General characteristics
- Type: cargo ship
- Length: 32 m (105 ft)
- Beam: 10 m (33 ft)
- Notes: cargo capacity ~200 tons

Shinan ship find site

- Sinan submarine relic burial area
- Hangul: 신안 해저유물 매장해역
- Hanja: 新安海底遺物埋藏海域
- Revised Romanization: Sinan haejeoyumul maejanghaeyeok
- McCune–Reischauer: Sinan haejŏyumul maejanghaeyŏk

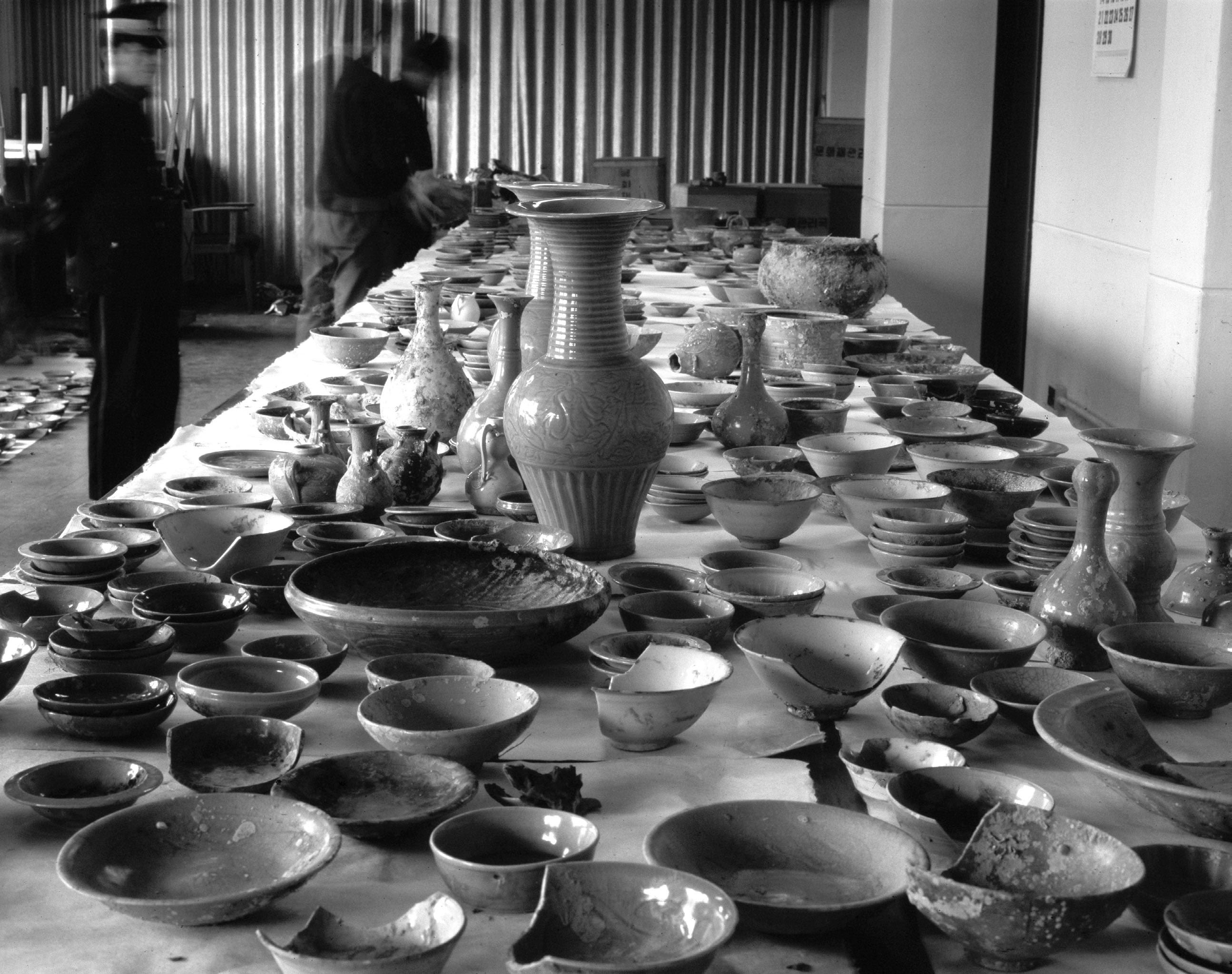
Artifacts recovered from the ship

The Shinan ship (also spelled "Sinan") was a 14th-century Chinese ship that sank near what are today the Shinan islands, South Korea, around the year 1323, and was discovered in 1975. It was likely to have been part of a trade fleet between Port Ningbo, Yuan dynasty China and Port Hakata, Kamakura shogunate of Japan.

It has been excavated during several maritime archaeological expeditions from 1976 to 1984. Its excavation has been described as "the first underwater excavation" in South Korea leading to "the advent of underwater archaeology in the history of Korean archaeology". Much of the ship's cargo survived mostly intact, and due to the overwhelming amount of Chinese treasures contained in the ship (over 28 tons of Chinese coins and over 20,000 pieces of Chinese ceramics), in the early 1990s the shipwreck was also described as possibly "the richest ancient shipwreck yet discovered".

== Discovery and excavation ==
On August 25, 1975, a South Korean fishing boat recovered several ceramic artifacts in its nets near the Imjado island in the Korean region of Shinan, in the Yellow Sea. The shipwreck was discovered shortly after. Beginning from the summer of 1976, Korean archaeologists, with support from the Korean Ministry of Culture and the Republic of Korea Navy launched a series of marine excavation projects in the area. The archaeologists quickly located a corroded wooden hull and much of its cargo, at the depth of about 20 meters. The excavation process was made difficult due to low visibility and tidal currents in the area (which meant that on some days, the divers could work as little as 15 minutes), and the series of expeditions, which took 9,800 man-days and 3,500 hours of diving time, concluded only after nearly a decade, in 1984.

In 1981 the site of the shipwreck was designated as one of the Historic Sites of South Korea (No. 274).

== The ship ==
The ship was identified as a 14th-century Chinese vessel from the Yuan dynasty period. It was likely to have been part of a trade fleet between Port Ningbo, Yuan dynasty China and Port Hakata, Kamakura shogunate of Japan. The destination of the ship's cargo were mostly temples and shrines in Kyoto, such as Tōfuku-ji temple, and in Hakata, such as Jōten-ji Temple. The ship's characteristics can be summarized as: "32 m in length, ca. 10 m in breadth, ca. 3.5 m in depth at amidships", with cargo capacity estimated at 200 tons.

== Significance ==
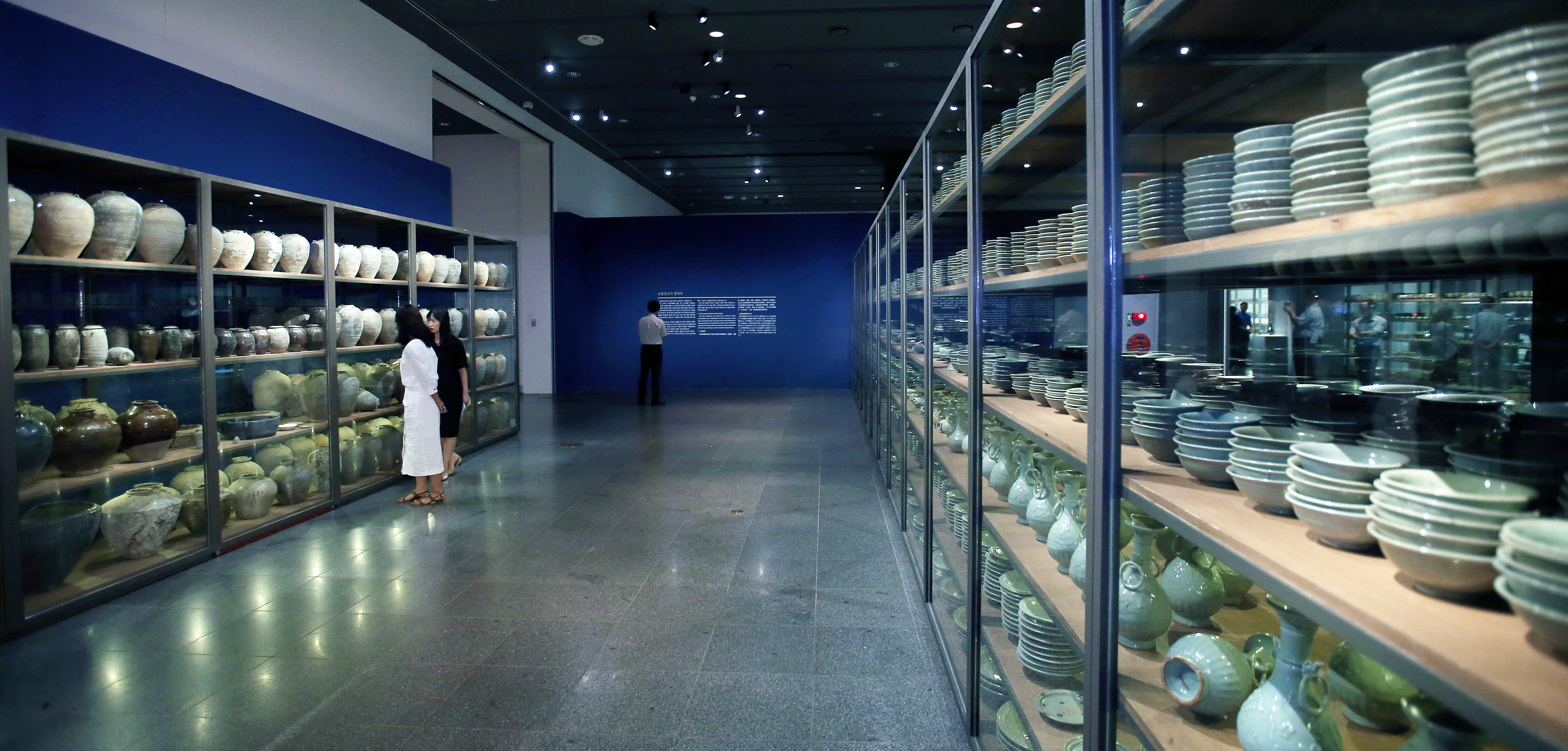
Ceramics recovered from the Shinan ship

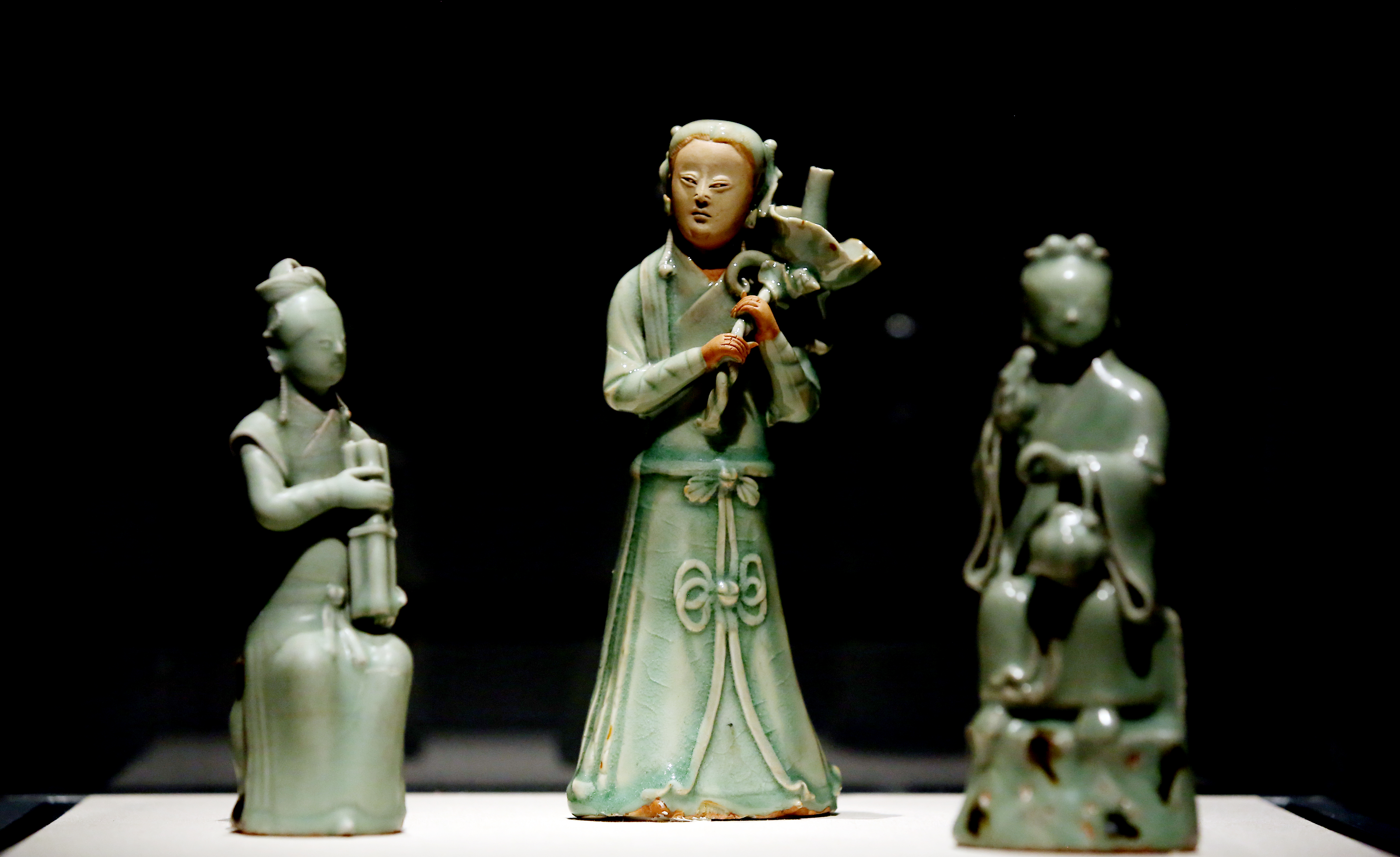
Figurines recovered from the Shinan ship

The excavation has been described as "the first underwater excavation" in South Korea leading to "the advent of underwater archaeology in the history of Korean archaeology". By the end of the excavation, the recovered objects, in addition to parts of the ship's hull itself, included "20,664 pieces of ceramic ware, 729 metal objects, 43 stone objects, 28 tons of Chinese coins, 1,017 pieces of red sandalwood (each about 1-2m long), and 1,346 other objects (including the crew's daily necessities)", and the size of the recovered cargo led to it being described in early-1990s as possibly "the richest ancient shipwreck yet discovered".

Around 1981 the reconstructed ship and many of its artifacts were displayed in the Mokpo Conservation Institute for Maritime Archaeological Finds in Mokpo. Subsequently, many artifacts were divided between several regional museums, although most were kept in storage. In commemoration of the 40th anniversary of the excavation, the National Museum of Korea held a special exhibition dedicated to the shipwreck in 2016. As 2010s, the ship and most of its related artifacts are displayed the National Research Institute of Maritime Cultural Heritage (the institution is also known as the National Maritime Museum in Mokpo).

== See also ==
- Quanzhou ship
- Huaguangjiao One
- Nanhai One
- Korea National Maritime Museum in Busan
- List of shipwrecks of Asia
