= Nanhai One =

Sunken Chinese merchant ship

Coordinates: 21°34′34″N 111°52′08″E

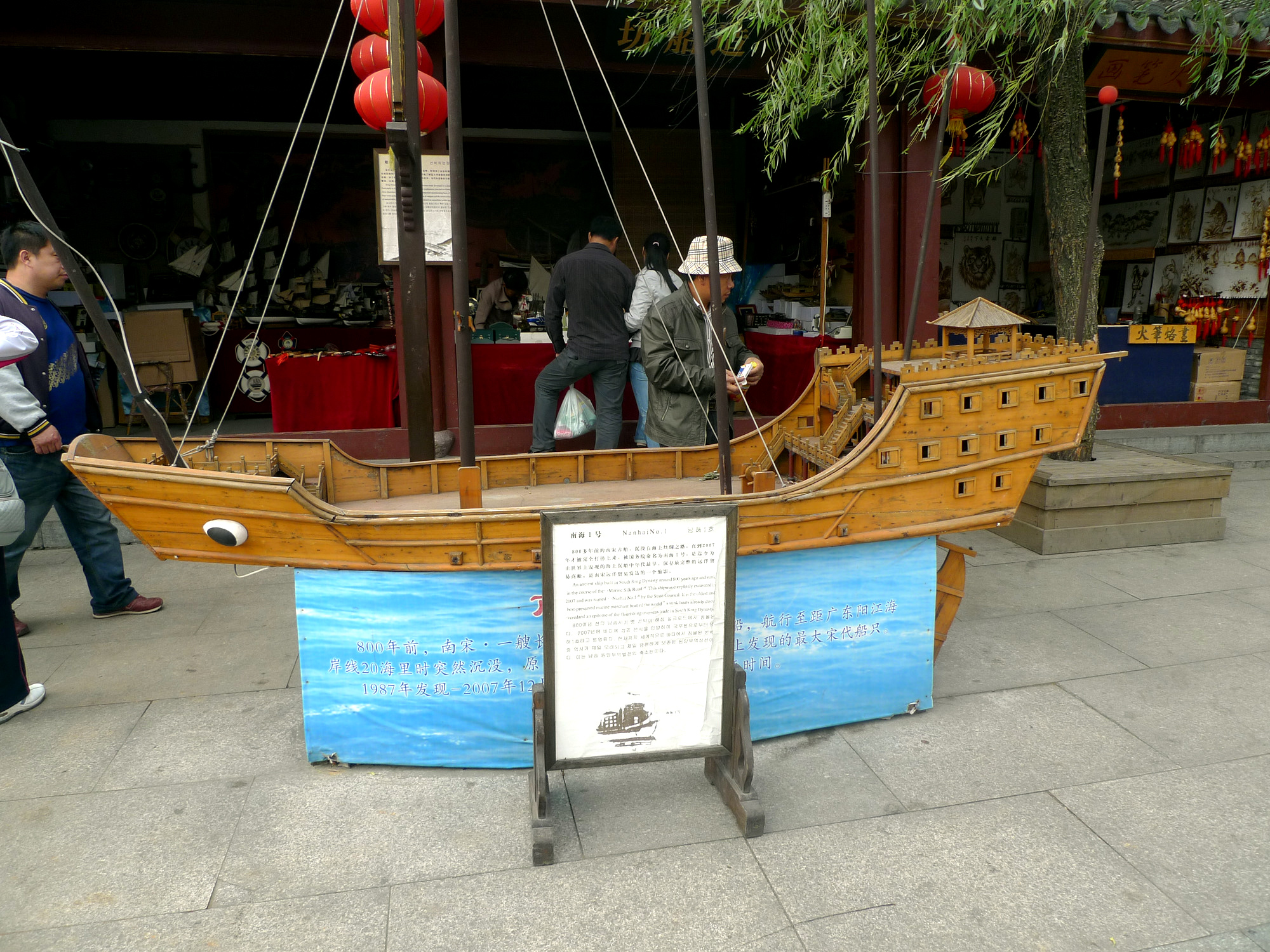
- Nanhai One model in Song City, Hangzhou

History

Song dynasty
- Name: Unknown
- Fate: Sank between 1127 and 1279

General characteristics
- Type: Cargo ship
- Length: 30.4 m (100 ft)
- Beam: 9.8 m (32 ft)

The Nanhai One (simplified Chinese: 南海一号; traditional Chinese: 南海一號; pinyin: Nánhǎi Yī Hào – South China Sea No. 1) is a Chinese merchant ship, which sank into the South China Sea during the Southern Song dynasty between 1127 and 1279.

== History ==
The shipwreck was found in 1987 by a team from Maritime Exploration & Recoveries PLC (MER PLC) of Southampton, England, during their search for the wreck of the 18th-century ship Rhynsburg. MER PLC had a joint venture with the Guangzhou branch of the Chinese Salvage Company.

The ship is 30.4 m (100 ft) long, 9.8 m (32 ft) wide, and 3.5 m (11 ft) in height (excluding the mast). It is the biggest ship of its kind to be found. It was the first ancient vessel discovered on the Maritime Silk Road. According to the head of the excavation project, the ship left port in southern China to trade with foreign countries and sank probably due to stormy waves. It was quickly buried by silt.

=== Artifacts ===
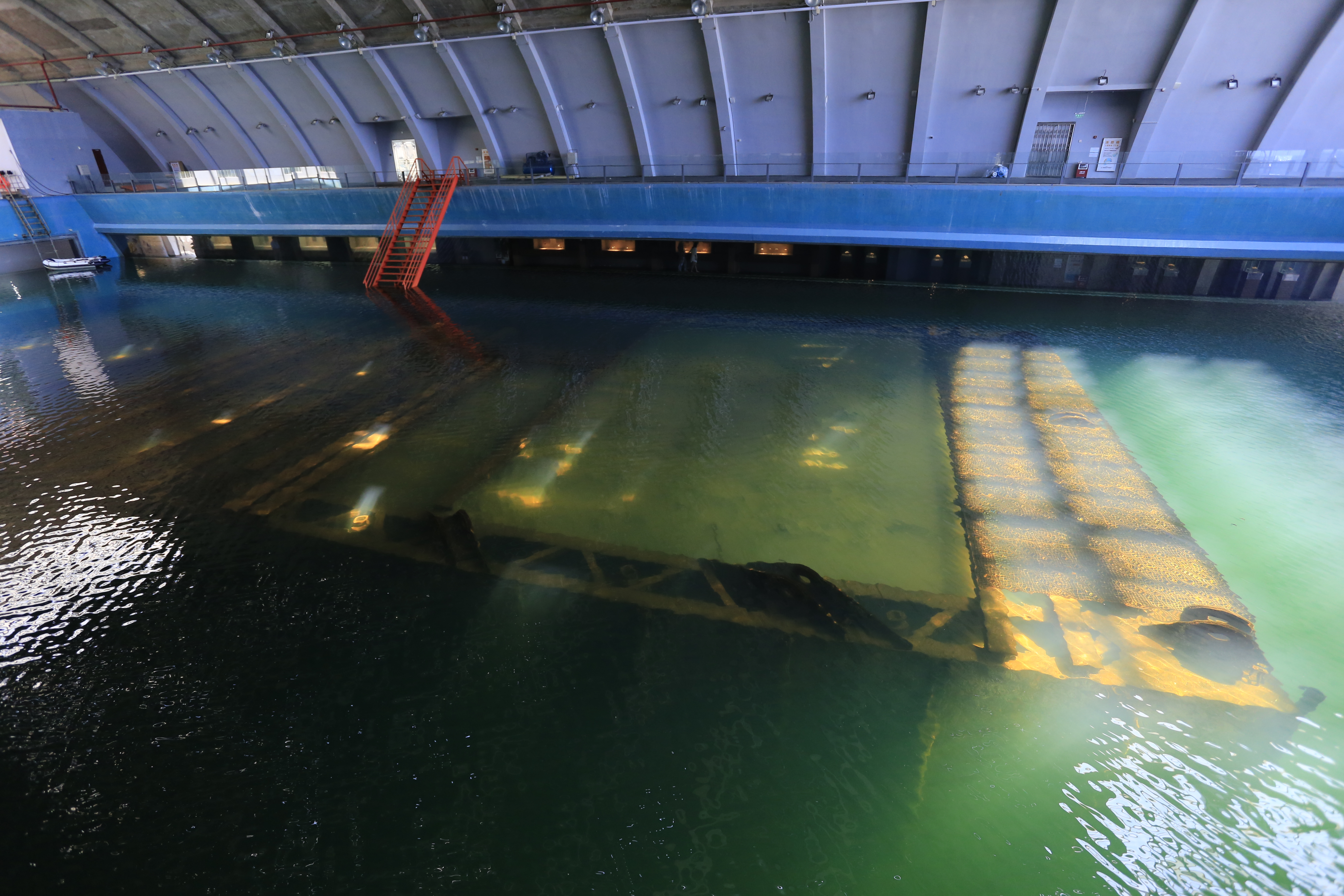
The "Crystal Palace" containing the Nanhai One in the Maritime Silk Route Museum

When the wreck was first found, about 200 pieces of porcelain from the Song dynasty were recovered, together with Song coins, about 130 kilos of silver bars, a brass kettle and a gold waist chain. These were handed to the China Salvage Company representatives, intact. At the time of the second survey, the wreck was reported to have 60,000 to 80,000 items on board.

In 2007, China began to raise the ship and its artifacts. The ship was placed in a pool-type container called the "Crystal Palace" in the purpose-built Maritime Silk Route Museum. The container is 64 meters long, 40 meters wide and 23 meters high. It contains seawater and is about 12 meters in depth. Visitors are able to watch the ongoing excavation of the ship through windows on two sides of the pool.

== See also ==
- Huaguangjiao One
- Quanzhou ship, from the Quanzhou Bay
- Shinan ship
- Lists of shipwrecks
