= List of companies of the Philippines =

Location of the Philippines

The Philippines is a sovereign island country in Southeast Asia situated in the western Pacific Ocean. It is a founding member of the United Nations, World Trade Organization, Association of Southeast Asian Nations, the Asia-Pacific Economic Cooperation forum, and the East Asia Summit. It also hosts the headquarters of the Asian Development Bank. The Philippines is considered to be an emerging market and a newly industrialized country, which has an economy transitioning from being one based on agriculture to one based more on services and manufacturing.

For further information on the types of business entities in this country and their abbreviations, see "Business entities in the Philippines".

== Largest companies ==
This list shows companies included in the 2022 Forbes Global 2000, which ranks companies based on four measures: sales, profit, assets and market value. The list only includes publicly traded firms.

Rank	Image	Name	Notable components	Sales (US$M)	Profit (US$M)	Assets (US$M)	Market Cap (US$M)
1008		SM Investments	SM Prime Holdings, Banco de Oro, Chinabank, SM Mall of Asia	8,140	781	25,310	20,010
1105		Banco de Oro	BDO Network Bank	4,280	904.2	69,480	11,320
1241		Top Frontier Investment Holdings	San Miguel Corporation	17,340	44	41,250	745
1931		Ayala Corporation	Ayala Land, Bank of the Philippine Islands, AC Industrials	4,580	563.4	26,500	8,960
1940		Metrobank	Philippine Savings Bank	2,340	449.5	49,110	4,760

== Notable companies ==
This list includes notable companies with primary headquarters located in the country. The industry and sector follow the Industry Classification Benchmark taxonomy. Organizations which have ceased operations are included and noted as defunct.

Notable companies Status: P=Private, S=State; A=Active, D=Defunct
Name	Industry	Sector	Headquarters	Founded	Notes	Status	
2GO	Industrials	Marine transportation	Manila	2012	Shipping, part of 2GO Group	P	A
2GO (cargo airline)	Industrials	Delivery services	Manila	1988	Cargo airline, part of 2GO Group	P	A
2GO Group	Industrials	Delivery services	Manila	1949	Transportation holding company	P	A
Aboitiz Equity Ventures	Conglomerates	-	Cebu	1989	Consumer goods, utilities, financials, industrials	P	A
ABS-CBN Corporation	Conglomerate	Media and entertainment	Quezon City	1946	Broadcasting, motion pictures, TV production, cable TV, internet, streaming service, broadcast syndication, talent agency, record label, telecommunications, satellite TV, film distribution, consumer products and services, part of Lopez Holdings Corporation	P	A
ABS-CBN Convergence	Telecommunications	Mobile telecommunications	Quezon City	2011	Cellular and DTT, part of ABS-CBN Corporation	P	A
ABS-CBN Publishing	Consumer services	Publishing	Quezon City	2000	Print publishing, part of ABS-CBN Corporation	P	A
ABS-CBN Studios	Consumer services	Broadcasting & entertainment	Quezon City	1962	Television production, part of ABS-CBN Corporation	P	A
Advanced Contact Solutions	Industrials	Business support services	Manila	1996	Business process outsourcing	P	D
Advanced Media Broadcasting System	Media media	Broadcasting & entertainment	Mandaluyong	1994	Broadcasting radio, television and consumer services, part of Streamtech	P	A
Adventist Medical Center Manila	Health care	Health care providers	Pasay	1929	Hospital	P	A
AgostoDos Pictures	Consumer services	Entertainment	-	2011	Film production	P	A
AirAsia Zest	Consumer services	Airlines	Pasay	1995	Airline, defunct 2015	P	D
Al-Amanah Islamic Bank	Financials	Banks	Zamboanga City	1973	Islamic bank	S	A
Alaska Milk Corporation	Consumer goods	Food products	Makati	1972	Dairy products, part of FrieslandCampina (Netherlands)	P	A
Alliance Global	Conglomerate	Various	Taguig	1993	Holding	P	A
Aliw Broadcasting Corporation	Mass media	Broadcasting & entertainment	Pasig	1991	Broadcaster, radio and consumer services, part of ALC Group of Companies	P	A
All Youth Channels	Consumer services	Broadcasting & entertainment	Pasig	2006	Broadcaster	P	A
Allied Bank	Financials	Banks	Manila	1977	Bank	P	D
Anima	Consumer services	Broadcasting and entertainment	Taguig	2016	Film production, part of Globe Telecom	P	A
APT Entertainment	Consumer services	Broadcasting and entertainment	Pasig	1994	Television and film production	P	A
Armscor	Consumer goods	Defense	Marikina	1905	Firearms	P	A
Asia Brewery	Consumer goods	Brewers	Makati	1982	Brewery	P	A
Asia United Bank	Financials	Banks	Pasig	1997	Commercial bank, part of Rebisco	P	A
Asian Hospital and Medical Center	Health care	Health care providers	Manila	2002	Hospital	P	A
Asian Television Content Corporation	Consumer services	Broadcasting & entertainment	Quezon City	2014	Broadcaster	P	A
Asian Vision	Telecommunications	Fixed line telecommunications	Makati	1973	Pay TV and broadband	P	A
Ayala Corporation	Conglomerates	-	Manila	1834	Financials, utilities, telecommunications, industrials	P	A
Ayala Land	Financials	Real estate holding & development	Makati	1988	Real estate, part of Ayala Corporation	P	A
Banco de Oro	Financials	Banks	Makati	1968	Universal bank	P	A
Bank of Commerce	Financials	Banks	Mandaluyong	1963	Commercial bank, part of San Miguel Corporation	P	A
Bank of the Philippine Islands	Financials	Banks	Manila	1851	Universal bank, part of Ayala Corporation	P	A
Bayan Telecommunications	Telecommunications	Fixed line telecommunications	Quezon City	1986	Telecom, ISP, part of Globe Telecom	P	A
Bombo Radyo Philippines	Consumer services	Broadcasting & entertainment	Iloilo City	1966	Radio	P	A
Brigada Mass Media Corporation	Consumer services	Publishing	General Santos	2005	Newspaper publisher	P	A
Brightlight Productions	Consumer services	Broadcasting and entertainment	Taguig	2020	TV production	P	A
Broadcast Enterprises and Affiliated Media	Consumer services	Broadcasting & entertainment	Mandaluyong	2011	Broadcaster	P	A
CDO Foodsphere	Consumer goods	Food products	Valenzuela, Metro Manila	1975	Meat	P	A
Cebgo	Consumer services	Airlines	Pasay	1995	Low-cost airline, part of Cebu Pacific	P	A
Cebu Pacific	Consumer services	Airlines	Pasay	1996	Airline	P	A
Cebu Landmasters	Financials	Real estate holding & development	Cebu	2003	Real estate	P	A
Cebuana Lhuillier	Financials	Specialty finance	Manila	1988	Pawn and moneylender	P	A
Century Pacific Food	Consumer goods	Food products	Pasig	2013	Meat and fish	P	A
Century Properties	Financials	Real estate holding & development	Makati	1986	Real estate	P	A
Cherry Mobile	Technology	Telecommunications equipment	Manila	2008	Mobile phones	P	A
Chinabank	Financials	Banks	Makati	1920	Universal bank	P	A
Chooks-to-Go	Consumer services	Restaurants & bars	Pasig	2009	Roast chicken chain	P	A
Chowking	Consumer services	Restaurants & bars	Pasig	1985	Restaurant chain, part of Jollibee Foods Corporation	P	A
Christian Era Broadcasting Service International	Consumer services	Broadcasting & entertainment	Quezon City	1969	Television and radio	P	A
CIBI Information, Inc	Financials	Investment services	Makati	1982	Credit bureau	P	A
Cignal TV	Telecommunications	Mobile telecommunications	Taguig	2009	Satellite television, film and television production; part of MediaQuest arm of PLDT	P	A
Citystate Savings Bank	Financials	Banks	Pasig	1997	Thrift bank, part of ALC Group of Companies	P	A
Coca-Cola Beverages Philippines	Consumer goods	Beverages	Quezon City	1981	Soft drinks, part of The Coca-Cola Company (US)	P	A
Comfoods	Consumer goods	Food products	Makati	1951	Food and drink	P	A
Converge ICT Solutions	Telecommunications	Fixed line telecommunications	Pasig	2009	Broadband, pay TV and IPTV	P	A
Cosmetique Asia Corporation	Consumer goods	Manufacturing	Quezon City	2001	Personal care, health care and food products	P	A
Cotabato Light and Power Company	Utilities	Conventional electricity	Cotabato City	1938	Power distribution	P	A
Creative Programs	Consumer services	Broadcasting & entertainment	Quezon City	1995	Pay TV channels, part of ABS-CBN Corporation	P	A
Davao Doctors Hospital	Health care	Health care providers	Davao City	1969	Hospital	P	A
Davao Light and Power Company	Utilities	Conventional electricity	Davao City	1929	Power distribution	P	A
De La Salle Medical and Health Sciences Institute	Health care	Health care providers	Dasmariñas	1987	Health care education	P	A
Del Monte Motors	Industrials	Commercial vehicles & trucks	Quezon City	1950	Bus and truck	P	A
Delimondo	Consumer goods	Food products	Makati	2006	Part of the JAKA Group	P	A
Delta Motors Corporation	Consumer goods	Automobiles	Manila	1962	Automobiles, defunct 1984	P	D
Destiny Cable	Telecommunications	Fixed line telecommunications	Quezon City	1995	Pay TV, part of Sky Cable Corporation	P	A
Development Bank of the Philippines	Financials	Banks	Manila	1947	Government bank	S	A
Digify Inc.	Consumer services	Broadcasting & entertainment	Quezon City	2000	Media company part of GMA Network	P	A
Digital Telecommunications Philippines	Telecommunications	Fixed line telecommunications	Quezon City	1987	Telecom, part of PLDT, defunct 2022	P	D
Dito Telecommunity	Telecommunications	Fixed line telecommunications	Taguig	1998	Telecom	P	A
DMCI Homes	Financials	Real estate holding & development	Makati	1995	Real estate	P	A
DoubleDragon Properties	Financials	Real estate holding & development	Pasay	2009	Real estate	P	A
Dreamscape Entertainment	Consumer services	Broadcasting and entertainment	Quezon City	1992	TV production, part of ABS-CBN Corporation	P	A
Dream Satellite TV	Telecommunications	Mobile telecommunications	Angeles City	2001	Satellite, defunct 2017	P	D
DWAO-TV	Consumer services	Broadcasting & entertainment	Caloocan	1999	Television, part of Progressive Broadcasting Corporation	P	A
DZCE-TV	Consumer services	Broadcasting & entertainment	Quezon City	2005	Also known as INC TV	P	A
Eagle Broadcasting Corporation	Consumer services	Broadcasting & entertainment	Quezon City	1968	Broadcaster radio, television, digital media, films, music and web portals	P	A
Eastern Telecommunications Philippines	Telecommunications	Fixed line telecommunications	Makati	1878	Broadband	P	A
EastWest Bank	Financials	Banks	Taguig	1994	Universal bank, part of Filinvest	P	A
Energy Development Corporation	Power generation	Renewable energy	-	1976	Electricity, part of Lopez Group	P	A
Enfant Philippines	Consumer goods	Apparel retailers	Manila	1995	Baby goods and apparel	P	A
ePLDT Ventus	Industrials	Business support services	Makati	2001	Contact centers	P	A
Fil-Asian Airways	Consumer services	Airlines	Cebu	2011	Airline, defunct 2014	P	D
Filinvest	Conglomerates	-	Taguig	1955	Real estate, hotels, tourism, banking	P	A
First Philippine Holdings Corporation	Conglomerate	Power generation and distribution	Pasig	1961	Electricity, part of Lopez Group	P	A
Food Terminal Inc.	Industrial and agricultural enterprises	-	Taguig	1974	Food processing	S	A
G Sat	Telecommunications	Mobile telecommunications	Makati	2009	Satellite television	P	A
Gandang Kalikasan, Inc.	Consumer goods	Manufacturing	Quezon City	2008	Personal care, health care and home products	P	A
Gerry's Grill	Consumer services	Restaurants & bars	Quezon City	1997	Restaurant	P	A
Ginebra San Miguel, Inc.	Consumer goods	Distilled beverages	Mandaluyong	1902	Liquor, part of San Miguel Food and Beverage	P	A
Globe Telecom	Telecommunications	Fixed line telecommunications	Taguig	1935	Telecom and broadband, part of Ayala Corporation	P	A
GMA Entertainment Group	Consumer services	Broadcasting & entertainment	Quezon City	2001	Television production, part of GMA Network	P	A
GMA Music	Consumer services	Broadcasting & entertainment	Quezon City	1995	Record label part of GMA Network	P	A
GMA Network	Mass Media	Broadcasting & entertainment	Quezon City	1950	Broadcasting, radio, streaming, television, films, music, television program, Web portals, talent agency, consumer products and services	P	A
GMA New Media	Consumer services	Broadcasting & entertainment	Quezon City	2000	Digital Media and technology part of GMA Network	P	A
GMA Pictures	Consumer services	Broadcasting & entertainment	Quezon City	1995	Film and television productions and distribution part of GMA Network	P	A
GMA Worldwide	Consumer services	Broadcasting & entertainment	Quezon City	1996	International television distribution part of GMA Network	P	A
Go Nuts Donuts	Consumer services	Restaurants & bars	Manila	2003	Shop chain	P	A
The IdeaFirst Company	Consumer services	Entertainment	Quezon City	2014	Television and film production	P	A
Insular Life	Financials	Full line insurance	Alabang	1910	Insurance	P	A
Integrated Micro-Electronics, Inc.	Industrials	Electronic equipment	Biñan	1980	Electronics, part of Ayala Group	P	A
Intercontinental Broadcasting Corporation	State media	Broadcasting & entertainment	Quezon City	1960	State broadcaster, radio and television, part of Presidential Communications Office	S	A
Interisland Airlines	Consumer services	Airlines	Pasay	2014	Airline	P	A
Isetann Department Store	Consumer services	Broadline retailers	Manila	1979	Retail stores	P	A
JG Summit Holdings	Conglomerates	-	Pasig	1957	Financials, industrials, power, chemicals	P	A
Jollibee Foods Corporation	Consumer services	Restaurants & bars	Quezon City	1978	Fast food	P	A
Land Bank of the Philippines	Financials	Banks	Manila	1963	Main government bank	S	A
LBC Express	Industrials	Delivery services	Pasay	1945	Cargo and courier services	P	A
Lopez Holdings Corporation	Conglomerate	-	Pasig	1928	Media, telecommunications, power generation, financials	P	A
Lung Center of the Philippines	Health care	Health care providers	Quezon City	1981	Hospital	S	A
Macay Holdings	Consumer goods	Soft drinks	Makati	2014	Beverages	P	A
Magnolia, Inc.	Consumer goods	Food products	Pasig	1981	Dairy products, part of San Miguel Food and Beverage	P	A
Makati Medical Center	Health care	Health care providers	Makati	1969	Hospitals	P	A
Malaya	Consumer services	Publishing	Manila	1981	Newspaper	P	A
Malagos Chocolate	Consumer goods	Food products	Davao City	2012	Chocolates	P	A
Mang Inasal	Consumer services	Restaurants & bars	Pasig	2003	Restaurant, part of Jollibee Foods Corporation	P	A
Manila Broadcasting Company	Mass media	Broadcasting & entertainment	Pasay	1939	Broadcaster radio, television, digital media and Consumer services	P	A
Manila Bulletin	Consumer services	Publishing	Manila	1900	Newspaper	P	A
Manila Hotel	Consumer services	Hotels	Manila	1912	Hotel	P	A
Manila North Tollways Corporation	Industrials	Transportation services	Caloocan	1997	Infrastructure	P	A
Manila Standard	Consumer services	Publishing	Makati	1987	Newspaper	P	A
Manila Times	Consumer services	Publishing	Manila	1898	Newspaper	P	A
Manila Water	Utilities	Water	Quezon City	1997	Water utility, part of Ayala Corporation	P	A
Max's Restaurant	Consumer services	Restaurants & bars	Quezon City	1945	Restaurant	P	A
Maynilad Water Services	Utilities	Water	Quezon City	1997	Water utility, part of Metro Pacific Investments	P	A
McDonald's Philippines	Consumer services	Restaurants & bars	Makati	1981	Fast food, part of McDonald's (US) and Alliance Global	P	A
MediaQuest Holdings	Holding firm	Media and entertainment	Mandaluyong	1998	Broadcasting, telecommunications, pay TV, films, music, online, print, consumer services, part of PLDT	P	A
Megaworld Corporation	Financials	Real estate holding & development	Taguig	1989	Real estate	P	A
Megaworld Lifestyle Malls	Consumer services	Broadline retailers	Quezon City	2009	Malls, part of Megaworld Corporation	P	A
Meralco	Utilities	Conventional electricity	Pasig	1895	Electrical utility	P	A
Mercury Drug	Consumer services	Drug retailers	Quezon City	1945	Drug sales	P	A
Metro Pacific Investments	Conglomerates	Various	Makati	2006	Holding	P	A
Metro Retail Stores Group	Consumer services	Broadline retailers	Cebu	1982	Retailer	P	A
Metropolitan Bank and Trust Company	Financials	Banks	Makati	1962	Universal bank	P	A
Metropolitan Medical Center	Health care	Health care providers	Tondo	1962	Hospital	P	A
Mighty Corporation	Consumer goods	Tobacco	Manila	1945	Tobacco	P	A
Monde Nissin	Consumer goods	Food products	Santa Rosa, Laguna	1979	Food	P	A
MQ Artists Agency	Consumer services	Broadcasting & entertainment	Mandaluyong	2010	Talent agency, part of TV5 Network	P	A
MQ Digital	Consumer services	Broadcasting & entertainment	Mandaluyong	2015	Digital media and technology, part of TV5 Network	P	A
MQuest Music	Consumer services	Broadcasting & entertainment	Mandaluyong	2025	Music recording, part of TV5 Network	P	A
MQ Studios	Consumer services	Broadcasting & entertainment	Mandaluyong	2005	Film and television productions and distribution part of TV5 Network	P	A
MQ Worldwide	Consumer services	Broadcasting & entertainment	Mandaluyong	2011	International television distribution part of TV5 Network	P	A
MQuest Ventures	Consumer services	Broadcasting & entertainment	Mandaluyong	2008	Television production, part of TV5 Network	P	A
MyPhone	Telecommunications	Mobile telecommunications	Parañaque	2007	Mobile phones	P	A
Nation Broadcasting Corporation	Consumer services	Broadcasting & entertainment	Mandaluyong	1963	Broadcaster; part of MediaQuest arm of PLDT	P	A
National Book Store	Consumer services	Specialty retailers	Mandaluyong	1930	Book retailer	P	A
National Grid Corporation of the Philippines	Utilities	Conventional electricity	Quezon City	2009	Power distribution	P	A
National Kidney and Transplant Institute	Health care	Health care providers	Quezon City	1981	Hospital	P	A
National Power Corporation	Utilities	Conventional electricity	Quezon City	1936	State power distribution	S	A
National Transmission Corporation	Utilities	Conventional electricity	Quezon City	2001	State power distribution	S	A
Negros Navigation	Industrials	Marine transportation	Manila	1932	Shipping, defunct 2012	P	D
Net 25	Consumer services	Broadcasting & entertainment	Quezon City	1999	Broadcaster, part of Eagle Broadcasting Corporation	P	A
Nicanor Reyes Medical Foundation	Health care	Health care providers	Quezon City	1952	Medical school	P	A
Nine Media Corporation	Consumer services	Broadcasting & entertainment	Mandaluyong	2010	Broadcaster, part of ALC Group of Companies	P	A
Now Corporation	Conglomerate	-	Makati	1996	Information and communications technology, Broadband, Cybersecurity	P	A
NutriAsia	Consumer goods	Food products	Taguig	1990	Condiments	P	A
O Shopping	Consumer services	Broadcasting & entertainment	Taguig	2013	Consumer products, part of ABS-CBN Corporation, defunct 2020	P	D
OctoArts Films	Consumer services	Broadcasting and entertainment	Quezon City	1989	Film production	P	A
One Network Bank	Financials	Banks	Davao City	2004	Bank, part of Banco de Oro	P	A
Ospital ng Maynila Medical Center	Health care	Health care providers	Manila	1969	Hospital	S	A
Our Lady of Lourdes Hospital	Health care	Health care providers	Manila	1958	Hospital	P	A
Ovation Productions	Consumer services	Entertainment	Mandaluyong	1991	Live events, concerts	P	A
Pacific Pearl Airways	Consumer services	Airlines	Makati	2006	Airline	P	A
PAL Express	Consumer services	Airlines	Pasay	1995	Airline, part of Philippine Airlines	P	A
People's Television Network	State media	Broadcasting & entertainment	Quezon City	1974	State broadcaster, television part of Presidential Communications Office	S	A
Pepsi-Cola Products Philippines	Consumer goods	Beverages	Muntinlupa	1989	Soft drinks, part of Lotte Chilsung (South Korea) and PepsiCo (US)	P	A
Petron Corporation	Oil & gas	Exploration & production	Mandaluyong	1933	Oil refining, part of San Miguel Corporation	P	A
Philippine Airlines (PAL)	Consumer services	Airlines	Pasay	1935	Airline	P	A
Philippine Amusement and Gaming Corporation	Consumer services	Gambling	Manila	1977	Gaming	S	A
Philippine Bank of Communications	Financials	Banks	Makati	1939	Commercial bank	P	A
Philippine Business Bank	Financials	Banks	Caloocan	1997	Savings bank	P	A
Philippine Collective Media Corporation	Consumer services	Broadcasting & entertainment	Makati	2008	Broadcaster	P	A
Philippine Daily Inquirer	Consumer services	Publishing	Makati	1985	Newspaper	P	A
Philippine General Hospital	Health care	Health care providers	Manila	1907	Hospital	S	A
Philippine Heart Center	Health care	Health care providers	Quezon City	1975	Hospital	S	A
Philippine National Bank	Financials	Banks	Manila	1916	Universal bank	P	A
Philippine National Construction Corporation	Industrials	Heavy construction	Manila	1966	State-owned construction	S	A
Philippine National Oil Company	Oil & gas	Exploration & production	Taguig	1973	State oil & gas	S	A
Philippine Postal Corporation	Industrials	Delivery services	Manila	1767	Postal service	S	A
Philippine Savings Bank	Financials	Banks	Makati	1959	Savings bank, part of Metrobank	P	A
Philippine Telegraph and Telephone Corporation	Telecommunications	Fixed line telecommunications	Makati	1962	Broadband, information technology	P	A
Philippine Veterans Bank	Financials	Banks	Makati	1963	Commercial bank	P	A
Philippines AirAsia	Consumer services	Airlines	Pasay	2010	Airline	P	A
Philtrust Bank	Financials	Banks	Manila	1916	Universal bank	P	A
Phoenix Petroleum	Oil & gas	Exploration & production	Davao City	2002	Oil & gas	P	A
Plantersbank	Financials	Banks	Makati	1971	Development bank, defunct 2016	P	D
Play Innovations	Amusement services	Entertainment center	Taguig	2013	Entertainment center, part of ABS-CBN Corporation, defunct 2020	P	D
PLDT	Telecommunications	Fixed line telecommunications	Makati	1928	Telecom and digital services	P	A
PMFTC	Consumer goods	Tobacco	Makati	2010	Tobacco	P	A
Presidential Broadcast Service	State media	Broadcasting & entertainment	Quezon City	1947	State broadcaster, radio network, part of Presidential Communications Office	S	A
Primer Group of Companies	Consumer services	Retail	Manila	1985	Consumer brands	P	A
Procter & Gamble Philippines	Consumer goods	Manufacturing	Taguig	1935	Home, personal care and consumer healthcare products, part of Procter & Gamble (US)	P	A
Progressive Broadcasting Corporation	Consumer services	Broadcasting & entertainment	Mandaluyong	1987	Broadcasting radio and television	P	A
Property Company of Friends	Financials	Real estate holding & development	Mandaluyong	1999	Real estate development	P	A
Puregold	Consumer services	Broadline retailers	Manila	1998	Supermarket chain	P	A
Quest Broadcasting	Consumer services	Broadcasting & entertainment	Mandaluyong	1986	Broadcaster	P	A
Radio Corporation of the Philippines	Consumer services	Broadcasting & entertainment	Manila	1924	Radio, television	P	A
Radio Mindanao Network	Mass media	Broadcasting & entertainment	Makati	1952	Broadcasting radio, television, digital media and Consumer services	P	A
Radio Philippines Network	State media	Broadcasting & entertainment	Quezon City	1960	State broadcaster, radio, television, digital media, part of Presidential Communications Office (20% minority share)	S	A
Rajah Broadcasting Network	Consumer services	Broadcasting & entertainment	Makati	1963	Radio, television	P	A
Rappler	Consumer services	Broadcasting & entertainment	Pasig	2012	Online media	P	A
Rebisco	Consumer goods	Food products	Pasig	1963	Snacks and biscuits	P	A
Red Mobile	Telecommunications	Mobile telecommunications	Makati	2012	Mobile network, part of PLDT	P	D
Red Ribbon	Consumer services	Restaurants & bars	Quezon City	1979	Bakery, part of Jollibee Foods Corporation	P	A
Regal Entertainment	Consumer services	Broadcasting & entertainment	Quezon City	1962	Television and film production	P	A
RFM Corporation	Consumer goods	Food products	Mandaluyong	1957	Food and beverage	P	A
Rizal Commercial Banking Corporation	Financials	Banks	Makati	1960	Universal bank	P	A
Robinsons Malls	Consumer services	Broadline retailers	Quezon City	1997	Shopping malls, part of Robinsons Retail Holdings	P	A
Robinsons Retail Holdings	Consumer services	Retailers	Pasig	1980	Retail holding	P	A
San Juan de Dios Hospital	Health care	Health care providers	Pasay	1578	Hospital and college	P	A
San Miguel Brewery	Consumer goods	Brewers	Mandaluyong	2007	Brewery, part of San Miguel Food and Beverage	P	A
San Miguel Corporation	Conglomerates	Various	Mandaluyong	1890	Consumer goods, industrials, oil & gas	P	A
San Miguel Food and Beverage	Consumer goods	Food products	Pasig	1956	Food and drink, part of San Miguel Corporation	P	A
Sarao Motors	Consumer goods	Automobiles	Las Piñas	1953	Automotive	P	A
Seaoil	Oil & gas	Exploration & production	Pasig	1978	Oil & gas	P	A
Security Bank	Financials	Banks	Makati	1951	Universal bank	P	A
Sky	Telecommunications	Fixed line telecommunications	Quezon City	1990	Pay TV and broadband, part of ABS-CBN Corporation	P	A
Sky Pasada	Consumer services	Airlines	Quezon City	2010	Airline	P	A
SkyJet Airlines	Consumer services	Airlines	Manila	2005	Airline	P	A
SM Investments	Conglomerates	-	Pasay	1994	Financials, retail, mining, gaming	P	A
SM Prime Holdings	Consumer services	Broadline retailers	Pasay	1958	Shopping malls, part of SM Investments	P	A
SM Supermalls	Consumer services	Broadline retailers	Pasay	1985	Shopping malls, part of SM Investments	P	A
SM Store	Consumer services	Broadline retailers	Manila	1958	Part of SM Investments	P	A
Smart Communications	Telecommunications	Mobile telecommunications	Makati	1991	Wireless, part of PLDT	P	A
Solar Entertainment Corporation	Consumer services	Broadcasting & entertainment	Mandaluyong	1976	Broadcaster	P	A
Sonshine Media Network International	Mass media	Broadcasting & entertainment	Davao City / Makati	1989	Religious broadcaster, radio, television, digital media and Consumer services	P	A
South Star Drug	Consumer services	Drug retailers	Naga	1937	Drugstores	P	A
Southern Broadcasting Network	Consumer services	Broadcasting & entertainment	Mandaluyong	1970	Broadcasting radio, television, part of Solar Entertainment Corporation	P	A
Southern Philippines Medical Center	Health care	Health care providers	Davao City	1917	Hospital	S	A
Sparkle GMA Artist Center	Consumer services	Broadcasting & entertainment	Quezon City	1995	Talent agency, part of GMA Network	P	A
Splash Corporation	Consumer goods	Personal care	Taguig	1985	Beauty products, part of Wipro Enterprises (India)	P	A
Spirit of Manila Airlines	Consumer services	Airlines	Pasay	2011	Airline, defunct 2012	P	D
Spring Films	Consumer services	Entertainment	-	2009	Film production	P	A
St. Luke's Medical Center	Health care	Health care providers	Quezon City	1903	Hospital	P	A
Sta. Lucia Land Inc.	Financials	Real estate holding & development	Cainta	1972	Real estate, hotels, golf course	P	A
Star Cinema	Consumer services	Broadcasting & entertainment	Quezon City	1993	Motion picture, part of ABS-CBN Corporation	P	A
Star Magic	Consumer services	Broadcasting & entertainment	Quezon City	1992	Talent agency, part of ABS-CBN Corporation	P	A
Star Music	Consumer services	Broadcasting & entertainment	Quezon City	1995	Music recording, part of ABS-CBN Corporation	P	A
Starmobile	Technology	Telecommunications equipment	Pasig	2011	Smartphone manufacturer	P	A
Studio Viva	Consumer services	Entertainment	Pasig	1986	Television production, part of Viva Communications	P	A
Summit Media	Consumer services	Publishing and entertainment	Mandaluyong	1995	Magazines, books, digital media	P	A
Sun Cellular	Telecommunications	Mobile telecommunications	Quezon City	2003	Mobile network, part of PLDT, defunct 2022	P	D
Supercat Fast Ferry Corporation (SFFC)	Industrials	Marine transportation	Cebu City	1994	Ferries	P	A
SuperFerry	Industrials	Marine transportation	Manila	1990	Ferries, founded as part of Aboitiz Shipping Company, defunct 2012	P	D
TAP Digital Media Ventures Corporation	Consumer services	Entertainment	Mandaluyong	2018	Pay TV channels, Over-the-top media service	P	A
TAPE Inc.	Consumer services	Broadcasting & entertainment	Quezon City	1978	Television production	P	A
TBA Studios	Consumer services	Entertainment	Quezon City	2017	Film production	P	A
The Daily Tribune	Consumer services	Publishing	Manila	1999	Newspaper	P	A
The Philippine Star	Consumer services	Publishing	Manila	1986	Newspaper; part of MediaQuest arm of PLDT	P	A
Tiger 22 Media Corporation	Consumer services	Broadcasting & entertainment	Makati	2010	Radio, marketing and advertising	P	A
TM	Telecommunications	Mobile telecommunications	Taguig	2001	Cell network, part of Globe Telecom	P	A
TNT	Telecommunications	Mobile telecommunications	Makati	1991	Cell network, part of Smart Communications	P	A
Tokyo Tokyo	Consumer services	Restaurants & bars	Quezon City	1985	Restaurant chain	P	A
Top Frontier Investment Holdings	Conglomerates	-	Makati	2008	Mining, food & beverage, power	P	A
TV5 Network	Mass media	Broadcasting & entertainment	Quezon City / Mandaluyong	1960	Broadcasting, radio, streaming, television, films, music, television program, web portals, talent agency, consumer and services; part of MediaQuest arm of PLDT	P	A
TVJ Productions	Consumer services	Broadcasting and entertainment	Mandaluyong	2023	TV production	P	A
Udenna Corporation	Conglomerates	Holding firm	Davao City	2002	Oil, shipping and logistics, real estate, education, telecommunications, gaming and hospitality, food and retail, infrastructure	P	A
Unilab	Consumer goods	Pharmaceutical	Mandaluyong	1945	Medicines, vitamins, supplements and personal care products	P	A
Unilever Philippines	Consumer goods	Food products, beverages and personal care	Taguig	1927	Foods, drinks and beauty products, part of Unilever (UK)	P	A
Union Bank of the Philippines	Financials	Banks	Pasig	1982	Universal bank	P	A
United Coconut Planters Bank	Financials	Banks	Makati	1963	Universal bank, defunct 2022	P	D
Universal Robina Corporation	Consumer goods	Food products	Quezon City	1954	Foods and beverages, part of JG Summit Holdings	P	A
University of Mindanao Broadcasting Network	Consumer services	Broadcasting & entertainment	Davao City	1949	Radio	P	A
University of Santo Tomas Hospital	Health care	Health care providers	Manila	1946	Hospital	P	A
Uniwide Sales	Consumer services	Broadline retailers	Parañaque / Las Piñas	1975	Shopping malls, defunct 2013	P	D
Upstream	Consumer services	Digital media and entertainment	Makati	2020	Over-the-top media service	P	A
Viva Artists Agency	Consumer services	Broadcasting & entertainment	Pasig	1997	Talent agency, part of Viva Communications	P	A
Viva Communications	Consumer services	Broadcasting & entertainment	Pasig	1981	Media holding	P	A
Viva Films	Consumer services	Entertainment	Pasig	1981	Film production, part of Viva Communications	P	A
Zest-O Corporation	Consumer goods	Beverage	Caloocan	1980	Drink	P	A
ZOE Broadcasting Network	Consumer services	Broadcasting & entertainment	Pasig	1998	Religious broadcaster	P	A

== See also ==
- Economy of the Philippines
- Business process outsourcing in the Philippines
