= China–ASEAN Investment Cooperation Fund =

Offshore multilateral cooperation fund

China-ASEAN Investment Cooperation Fund (CAF)
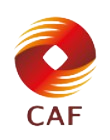
- Native name: 中国-东盟投资合作基金
- Industry: Private equity
- Founded: 2010
- Area served: ASEAN and China
- Key people: Li Wen, Chief Executive Officer; Song Siyuan, Chief Operating Officer
- Website: http://www.china-asean-fund.com

The China-ASEAN Investment Cooperation Fund, also knowns as the China Asean Fund or CAF, is a USD-denominated offshore multilateral cooperation fund majority owned by financial institutions of the Government of the People's Republic of China. It invests throughout Southeast Asia, which the fund defines as including China.

== Purpose ==
The Fund is part of the Chinese strategy to deepen cooperation between China and ASEAN, Chinese Premiere Li Keqiang reiterated on 9 September. 2013. In the speech, the premiere said, "China will activate a new round of special loans, make good use of the China-ASEAN Investment Cooperation Fund, and actively explore with other parties the creation of a financing platform for infrastructure development in Asia to fund major projects." China hopes to gain influence in ASEAN through the fund.

== Fundraising ==
The establishment of the fund was announced in 2009 by Chinese Premier Wen Jiabao and it began operations in 2010. Chinese Vice President Xi Jinping sees the fund as a way for the Chinese government to provide financial support to ASEAN. The fund, which is sponsored by the Export-Import Bank of China, among other institutional investors, became the first Southeast Asia-focused private equity fund approved by China's State Council and the National Development and Reform Commission. The Export-Import Bank of China is the "anchor sponsor" with a "seed investment" of US$300 million. Three other Chinese institutions were "cornerstone investors", investing a combined US$500 million. The sovereign wealth fund, the China Investment Corporation, "jointly founded" the fund along with the Export-Import Bank, according to the China Economic Review, quoting The Wall Street Journal. The International Finance Corporation of the World Bank invested US$100 million and became another "cornerstone investor." The Export-Import Bank owns 52% of the management company while the China Investment Corporation owns 24%.

The fund seeks ultimately to raise US$10 billion to invest in ASEAN countries. As of 2011, it had raised US$1 billion, of which US$400 million was invested in four companies in Cambodia, Laos, the Philippines and Thailand.

== Investments ==
2GO Group Inc.'s logo 2012-2018

The fund targets investment opportunities in infrastructure, energy and natural resources in the ASEAN countries.

=== Philippines ===
Its maiden investment was in the Philippines when it helped Negros Navigation buy out Aboitiz Transport Services owners of SuperFerry. Through an equity infusion, it took control of the former Negros Navigation and purchased the Aboitiz Transport System for US$105 million. The Aboitiz Transport System had been formed by first the break up of WG&A SuperFerry into SuperFerry and Carlos A. Gothong Lines and then the merging of SuperFerry with Cebu Ferries and SuperCat fast ferries into the Aboitiz Transport System. Negros Navigation was subsequently rebranded the 2GO Group and is the Philippines largest ferry and domestic freight company.

== China-ASEAN Maritime Cooperation Fund ==
The China-ASEAN Maritime Cooperation Fund was established in November 2011. The fund is underwritten by China and is valued at RMB 3 billion.
