= 2GO Group =

Filipino ferry company

2GO Group Inc.
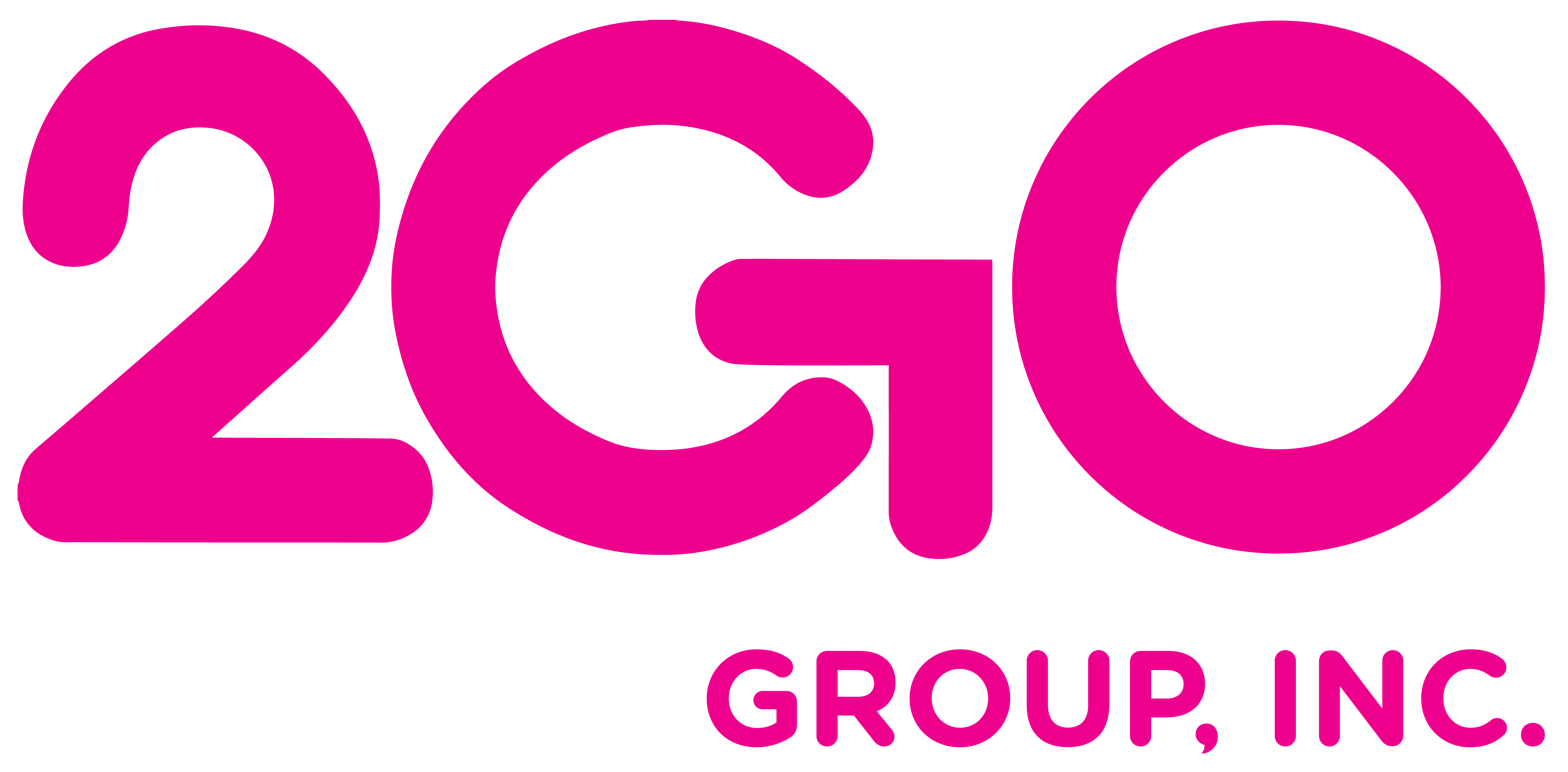
- Primary corporate logo
- Formerly: William Lines Inc. (1949-1996); WG&A Philippines Inc. (1996-2004); Aboitiz Transport System (2004-2012)
- Company type: Subsidiary
- Industry: Shipping, Transportation
- Founded: May 26, 1949; 77 years ago (as William Lines Inc.) in Cebu City, Philippines
- Founder: William Chiongbian
- Headquarters: 8F Tower 1 Double Dragon Plaza, Macapagal Blvd. cor. EDSA Ext., Pasay 1302, Philippines
- Key people: Frederic C. DyBuncio (Chairman, President & CEO); Francis C. Chua (Vice Chairman); William Charles Howell (COO & CFO)
- Products: Sea freight, Special containers, Project logistics, Forwarding, Contract logistics, Sea travel, Retail
- Revenue: ▲13.47 million PHP (Q3 2024)
- Operating income: ▼1.08 million PHP (Q3 2024) (Q3 2024)
- Net income: ▼0.60 million PHP (Q3 2024)
- Total assets: ▲15.75 million PHP (Q3 2024) (Q3 2024)
- Total equity: ▲2.49 million PHP (Q3 2024) (Q3 2024)
- Number of employees: 1,774 (December 31, 2024)
- Parent: SM Investments Corporation (67.12%); Trident Investments (31.73%)
- Divisions: Sea Solutions (2GO Travel and 2GO Freight); Logistics (2GO Express, 2GO Logistics, Special Container and Value-added Services, and Kerry Logistics); Distribution (Scanasia)
- Subsidiaries: 2GO Express, Special Container and Value Added Services, Inc. (SCVASI)
- Website: 2go.com.ph

2GO Group, Inc. (branded as 2GO) is a Philippine logistics and transportation company engaged in freight shipping, courier and parcel delivery, warehousing, inventory management, distribution, and passenger sea travel. It operates a fleet of ten inter-island vessels transporting cargo and passengers across domestic routes in the Philippines.

The company traces its roots to William Lines, Inc., which was established on May 26, 1949. William Lines grew to become one of the largest shipping companies in the Philippines during the 1970s to the 1990s, before eventually merging with other domestic shipping firms that later formed what is now known as 2GO Group, Inc.

2GO is a subsidiary of SM Investments Corporation (SMIC), one of the country's largest conglomerates. Another principal shareholder is Trident Investments.

== Company history ==
The company traces its roots to William Lines, Inc., which began as a shipping business founded by William Chiongbian on December 13, 1945, in Cebu City. He named one of its first vessels, the MV Victoriano, after his father; the ship made its maiden voyage serving the routes from Cebu to Tagbilaran, Bohol, and Siquijor, then to Plaridel and Ozamiz. The company was later incorporated on May 26, 1949. From the 1970s to the 1990s, the company introduced several flagship vessels, including MV Cebu City (1972), MV Doña Virginia (1980), and MV Sugbu (1989), and grew to become one of the largest shipping companies in the Philippines during that period.

In the 1990s, William Lines introduced the Mabuhay Series, comprising the company's largest and most luxurious vessels, designed to compete with rival fleets, including Sulpicio Lines and Aboitiz's SuperFerry ships. The first ship of the series, the Wilines Mabuhay 1, was acquired from Japan and was part of the well-known Sunflower series of vessels. Subsequently, William Lines added more ships to the Mabuhay Series, including Mabuhay 2, 3, 5, and 6.

In December 1995, William Lines acquired the assets of Gothong Lines and Aboitiz Shipping Corporation through a ₱5.68 billion share-swap deal, issuing new William Lines shares to the two companies in exchange for their shipping properties. The merger consolidated the operations of the three shipping firms, forming William, Gothong and Aboitiz Inc. (WG&A), which became the largest domestic shipping company in the Philippines.

The WG&A fleet was organized into three categories. SuperFerry, a brand carried over from Aboitiz Shipping, comprised the company's largest and most luxurious ships, primarily serving routes from Manila. This included vessels from William Lines’ Mabuhay Series; Mabuhay 1, 2, 3, and 5'. The remaining ships that did not meet SuperFerry standards were designated as WG&A Ferries, which also primarily served Manila-based routes. The other is Cebu Ferries, created during the merger, operated smaller vessels primarily serving routes from Cebu to the Visayas–Mindanao region.

Eventually in 2002 to 2004, Aboitiz Equity Ventures Inc. (AEV), one of the company's major shareholders, bought out its partners in WG&A for about ₱3.65 billion. AEV acquired 918 million shares, equivalent to approximately 61 percent of the shipping company. Aboitiz eventually bought out the remaining shares of the Chiongbians (William Lines) and Gothong.

The partnership was later dissolved, leading to the formation of the Aboitiz Transport System, which unified the operations of SuperFerry, Cebu Ferries, and SuperCat.

In September 2008, Aboitiz Equity Ventures decided to quit the shipping business to focus on its core businesses, namely power and financial services, and announced the sale of its controlling 77% stake in Aboitiz Transport System to KGLI‑NM Holdings, a joint venture between Negros Navigation and Dutch investors, with plans to acquire the remaining shares and potentially delist the company, but due to financing difficulties during the global financial crisis, KGLI‑NM was unable to complete the full buyout, paid only a P100 million option fee, and eventually withdrew its offer in May 2009, terminating the agreement.

On December 1, 2010, Aboitiz Equity Ventures sold its transport business to Negros Navigation Co. Inc. (NENACO) for US$105 million, transferring all logistics and shipping operations under new ownership. At the same time, the China–ASEAN Investment Cooperation Fund, a Netherlands-based (Note: The legally separate China-ASEAN Capital Advisory Company is based in Hong Kong.) private equity firm owned by the Government of the People's Republic of China, acquired a controlling stake in NENACO through an equity infusion.

In 2012, the company was reorganized and rebranded as 2GO Group Inc. with its brands SuperFerry, SuperCat, and Cebu Ferries merged with Negros Navigation to form 2GO Travel.

In 2016, SM Investments Corporation (SMIC) and Chelsea Logistics and Infrastructure Holdings Corp. (owned by Dennis Uy) jointly acquired a major stake in 2GO Group Inc. In 2021, Chelsea Logistics sold its shares to SMIC, making 2GO a full subsidiary of SM Investments Corporation.

In 2023, 2GO Group voluntarily delisted from the Philippine Stock Exchange after completing a tender offer and began a modernization program focusing on logistics, freight, and passenger transport.

== Operations ==
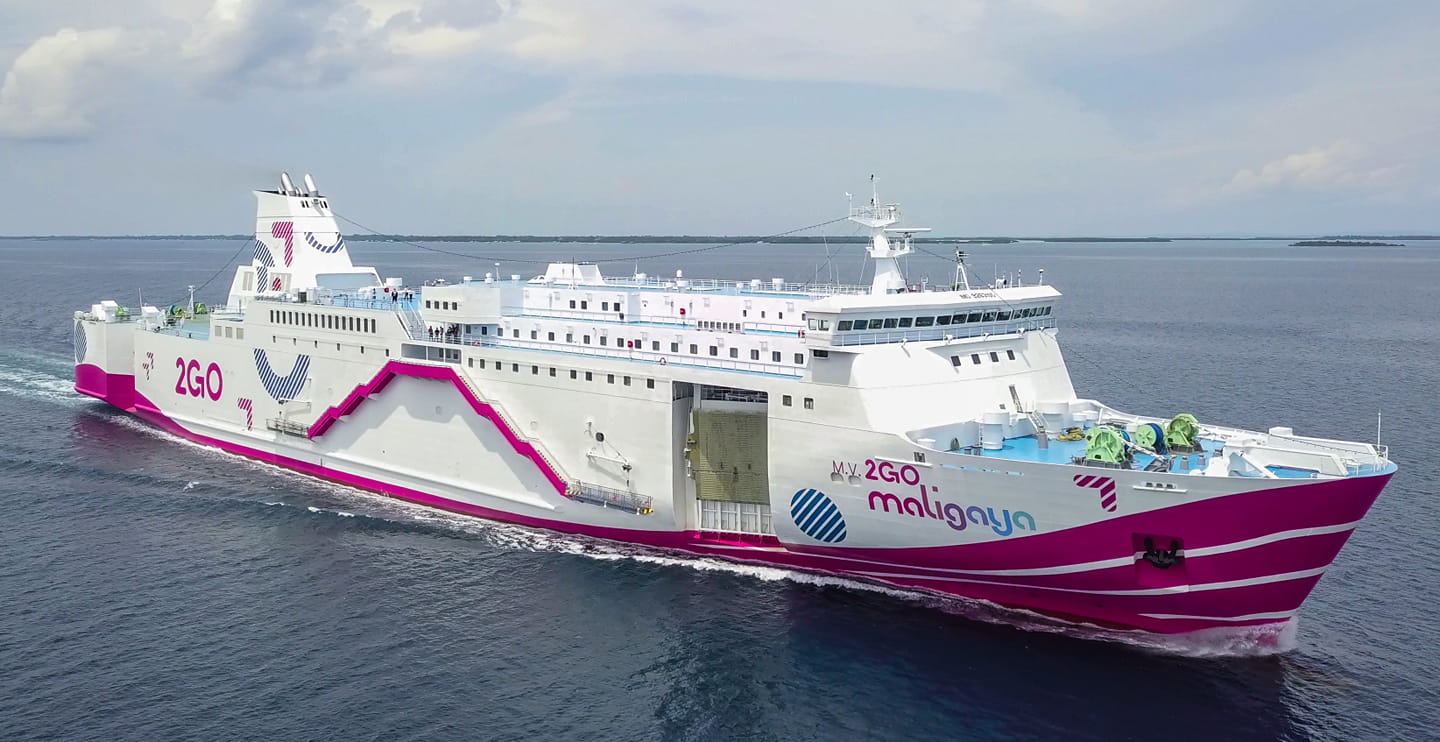
MV 2GO Maligaya

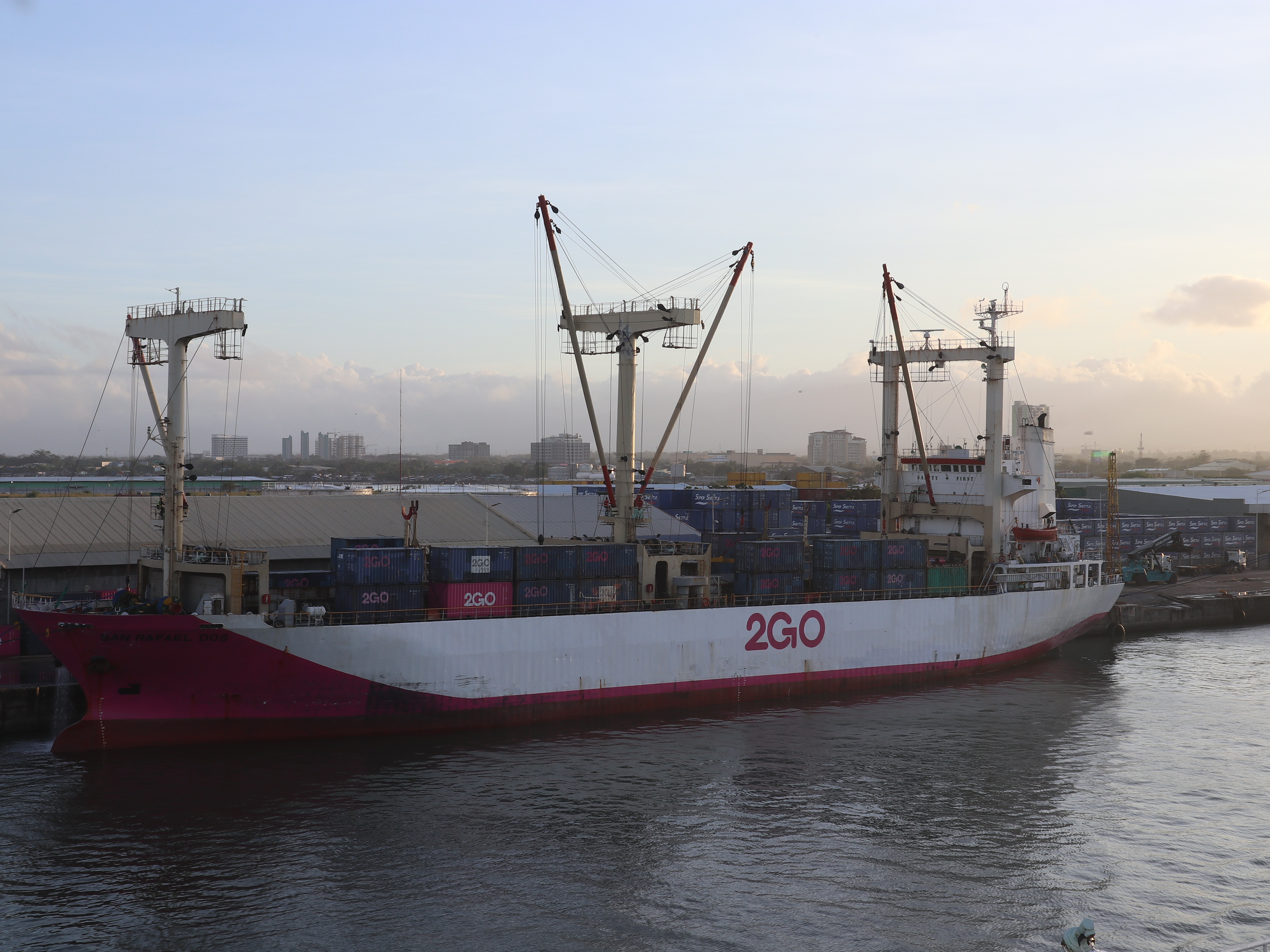
Cargo ship of 2GO Freight, part of the 2GO Group

Logo under the "2GO" brand

2GO and its subsidiaries (collectively referred to as the Group) provide shipping, logistics, and distribution services to small and medium enterprises, large corporations, and government agencies throughout the Philippines. The Group operates under its flagship brand, 2GO.

The Group's shipping operations manage inter-island roll-on/roll-off (RoRo) freight and passenger vessels. Its logistics arm offers transportation, warehousing, and distribution services, including cold chain solutions, domestic and international ocean and air forwarding, customs brokerage, project logistics, and express and last-mile package and e-commerce delivery. The distribution segment complements these operations by leveraging 2GO's shipping and logistics capabilities to provide value-added distribution services to principals and customers.

=== Business units ===
- Sea Solutions – Operates under the brands 2GO Freight and 2GO Travel.
  - 2GO Freight provides door-to-door and pier-to-pier transportation of raw materials and finished goods via full container load (FCL), less-than-container load (LCL), and loose cargo shipments, using a fleet of roll-on/roll-off (RoRo) passenger-cargo vessels (RoPax).
  - 2GO Travel offers passenger sea transportation nationwide, providing affordable travel with hotel, tour, and event packages.
- Logistics – Provides land, air, and sea transportation, warehousing, cross-docking, trucking, cold chain solutions, ISO tank and liquid bulk transport, domestic and international freight forwarding, customs brokerage, project logistics, and last-mile and e-commerce delivery.
- Distribution – Operates under ScanAsia Overseas Inc. (SOI), providing nationwide product distribution to retail outlets. SOI originally focused on dairy products and later expanded to fast-moving consumer goods (FMCG) and pharmaceuticals. The Board approved the cessation of Scanasia Overseas, Inc. operations effective 31 March 2024.

=== Subsidiaries ===
- 2GO Express, Inc. – Provides land, air, and sea transportation including courier services, general cargo, sea cargo services, and last-mile delivery for e-commerce. It operates a nationwide network of retail outlets and partner agents and partners with FedEx for international express services.
  - 2GO Logistics, Inc. – Provides transportation, warehousing, cross-docking, trucking, domestic freight, and inventory management solutions nationwide.
  - Kerry Logistics (Phils.), Inc. (KLPI) – A joint venture with Kerry Logistics Network Limited of Hong Kong, offering domestic and international freight forwarding, warehousing, distribution, customs brokerage, project logistics, and handling of dangerous goods.
  - 2GO Land Transport, Inc. – Provides cargo hauling and forwarding via trucks, container vans, and closed vans.
  - 2GO Retail – Offers domestic parcel delivery, FedEx international services, and 2GO Travel ticket sales through retail outlets and partner agents.
- Special Container and Value Added Services, Inc. (SCVASI) – Provides cold chain and liquid bulk transport solutions, including temperature-controlled vans and ISO tanks for FCL and LCL shipments, as well as project logistics for industries such as infrastructure, power, telecommunications, mining, and property.

2GO operates passenger and freight services connecting major ports across the Philippines, linking Luzon, the Visayas, and Mindanao. Its vessels serve routes to and from Bacolod, Batangas, Butuan, Cagayan de Oro, Caticlan, Cebu, Coron, Davao, Dipolog, Dumaguete, General Santos, Iloilo, Manila, Odiongan, Ozamiz, Puerto Princesa, Roxas, Siargao, Tagbilaran, and Zamboanga.

== Fleet ==
=== Current fleet ===
As of June 2026, 2GO and its subsidiaries own and operate a fleet of ten operating vessels, consisting of nine RoRo/Pax vessels and one freighter. 2GO's operating vessel fleet has a combined gross tonnage of approximately 159,295.

Currently, 2GO operates seven large RoRo/Pax vessels calling on Manila as their homeport. These vessels sail from Luzon to Visayas and Mindanao. Furthermore, 2GO operates two medium-sized vessels with Batangas as their homeport, plying on the Batangas-Odiongan-Caticlan and the Batangas-Caticlan-Roxas routes. 2GO also operates one purely-cargo vessel, with Manila as its homeport, to complement its freight business.

The company's flagship is currently the MV 2GO Masagana, one of the largest vessels ever to sail in the Philippines.

2GO's fleet includes two series of ships:

- The M Series (e.g., 2GO Maligaya, 2GO Masagana), named after Filipino words beginning with "Ma" that represent positive traits and attitudes of the Filipino people.)
- The S Series (e.g., St. Michael the Archangel, St. Francis Xavier), named after Roman Catholic saints.)

List of active vessels currently owned by 2GO Group
Vessel	IMO number	Built	Notes	Ref.
M Series (5 ships)
2GO Masagana	9263162	2003	Further information: 2GO Masagana The ship, originally named Tsukushi and built by Mitsubishi Heavy Industries in Shimonoseki, Japan, was sold to 2GO in March 2021. It is the sister ship of MV 2GO Maligaya. Measuring 195 m in length, 26 m in width, with a gross tonnage of 29,046, it can sail at speeds of up to 23.5 knots. Together, the sister ships are currently the largest ROPAX vessels in the Philippines, surpassing the previous record holder.	
2GO Maligaya	9263150	2003	Further information: 2GO Maligaya The ship began operations in Japan as Yamato for Hankyu Ferry. Built by Mitsubishi Heavy Industries in Shimonoseki, Japan, the ship was acquired in 2020 by Stena RoRo and renamed MV Stena Nova. In 2021, it was sold to 2GO and became the MV 2GO Maligaya. It is the sister ship of MV 2GO Masagana. Measuring 195 m in length, 26 m in width, with a gross tonnage of 29,046, she can sail at speeds of up to 23.5 knots.	
2GO Masikap	9258404	2002	Further information: 2GO Masikap The ship, originally Ferry Kyoto 2 of Meimon Taiyo Ferry in Japan, was acquired in 2022 by South Korea’s Hanil Express and named Hanil Car Ferry No. 1, later Blue Pearl. In 2023, it was sold to 2GO alongside MV 2GO Masigla and renamed MV 2GO Magalang, later 2GO Masikap. It is the sister ship of MV 2GO Masinag, measuring 167 m in length, 26 m in width, with a gross tonnage of 19,659, and can sail up to 21 knots. Built by Mitsubishi Heavy Industries in Shimonoseki, Japan.	
2GO Masinag	9258416	2002	Further information: 2GO Masinag The ship, originally Ferry Fukuoka 2 of Japan’s Meimon Taiyo Ferry Co. Ltd. until 2022, was acquired by South Korea’s SeaWorld Express Ferry Co. and renamed Queen Mary 2. The vessel joined 2GO in 2024 and is the sister ship of MV 2GO Masikap. Measuring 167 m in length, 26 m in width, with a gross tonnage of 19,659, she can sail up to 21 knots. Built by Mitsubishi Heavy Industries in Shimonoseki, Japan.	
2GO Masigla	9202833	1999	Further information: 2GO Masigla The ship, originally Orange 8 of Japan’s Shikoku Orange Ferry Ltd., was later acquired by South Korea’s MS Ferry and renamed New Star. In 2023, The ship joined 2GO. Measuring 163.75 m in length, 26 m in width, with a gross tonnage of 19,659, it can sail up to 20 knots. Built by Imabari Shipbuilding in Imabari, Japan.	
S Series (4 ships)
St. Michael the Archangel	9000455	1991	Also known as MV 2GO St. Michael the Archangel, it was acquired by Negros Navigation in 2011 as their final flagship. The ship previously served in Japan as Blue Diamond for Diamond Ferry and in South Korea as Queen Mary for SeaWorld Express Ferry. It is the sister ship of MV St. Francis Xavier, also acquired by 2GO in 2014. Measuring 150 m in length, 25 m in width, with a gross tonnage of 17,781, it can sail up to 17 knots. Built by Shin Kurushima Dockyard – Onishi Plant in Imabari, Japan.	
St. Francis Xavier	8847595	1991	Also known as MV 2GO St. Francis Xavier, It began service in Japan as Star Diamond for Diamond Ferry. The ship was later sold to overseas operators, sailing as Jiadong Pearl for China’s Northeast Asia Ferry and Gwangyang Beech for South Korea’s Gwangyang Ferry, before being acquired by 2GO in 2014 as the company’s first major purchase since its founding in 2012. It is the sister ship of MV St. Michael the Archangel, previously acquired by Negros Navigation in 2011. Measuring 150.87 m in length, 25 m in width, with a gross tonnage of 17,781, it can sail up to 18 knots. Built by Shin Kurushima Dockyard – Onishi Plant in Imabari, Japan.	
St. Ignatius of Loyola	8805157	1988	Also known as MV 2GO St. Ignatius of Loyola, the ship began operations in Japan as Esan for Donan Jidosha Ferry, operating as a RORO car ferry. In 2010, the ship was acquired by Aboitiz Transport System through Cebu Ferries during its re-fleeting program, renamed MV Cebu Ferry 3, and modified to include passenger accommodations. The ship was later transferred to 2GO in 2012. Measuring 104 m in length, 16 m in width, with a gross tonnage of 2,825, it can sail up to 12.9 knots. Built by Naikai Ship Building in Setoda, Hiroshima, Japan.	
St. Augustine of Hippo	8815530	1989	Also known as MV 2GO St. Augustine of Hippo, it originally served in Japan as Ferry Kumano for Nankai Ferry. In 2007, she was acquired by Aboitiz Transport System under the Cebu Ferries brand as part of its re-fleeting program and renamed MV Cebu Ferry 1, before being transferred to 2GO in 2012. Measuring 92 m in length, 16 m in width, with a gross tonnage of 2,487, it can sail up to 13 knots. Built by Shinhama Dockyard in Tamano, Japan.	
Freighter (1 ship)
San Rafael Dos	8513417	1985	Formerly known as Kyowa Violet, it was acquired by Negros Navigation in 2009 and later transferred to 2GO in 2012. It is currently 2GO’s only dedicated cargo ship, operating without fixed routes. Measuring 117.97 m in length, 19.21 m in width, with a gross tonnage of 7,337, she can sail up to 13.7 knots. Built by Taihei Kogyo in Hiroshima, Japan.	

== See also ==
- 2GO Travel
- 2GO (cargo airline)
- Philippine Span Asia Carrier Corporation
- Gothong Southern
- Gothong Lines
