= SuperFerry 9 =

Ferry which sank off the southwest coast of Zamboanga Peninsula, Philippines (2009)

Coordinates: 7.46°N 121.9°E

MV SuperFery 9
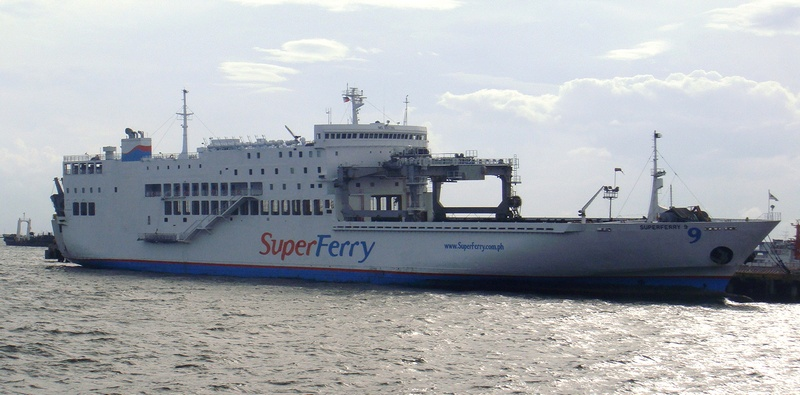

History

Japan
- Name: Ariake
- Owner: Ooshima Transportation Co. Ltd. (A" Line)
- Route: Tokyo - Naze (Amami island) - Naha (Okinawa)
- Builder: Usuki Tekkosho of Saiki, Ōita, Japan
- Yard number: 1328
- Launched: November 4, 1986
- Completed: July 8, 1986
- Maiden voyage: 1986
- In service: 1986–1995
- Out of service: September 1995
- Identification: IMO number: 8517396
- Fate: Sold to William Lines Inc.

Philippines
- Name: 1995-1996: Wilines Mabuhay 5; 1996-2009: SuperFerry 9
- Owner: 1995-1996: William Lines Inc.; 1996-2004: WG&A Philippines Inc.; 2004-2009: Aboitiz Transport System
- Operator: 1995-1996: William Lines Inc.; 1996-2009: SuperFerry
- Port of registry: Manila, Philippines
- Acquired: 1995
- Maiden voyage: 1996
- In service: 1995–2009
- Out of service: September 6, 2009
- Fate: Sank on September 6, 2009

General characteristics
- Class & type: Roll-on/lift-off (RO-LO) ferry
- Tonnage: 7,268 GT
- Length: 141.5 m (464 ft 3 in)
- Beam: 23.0 m (75 ft 6 in)
- Draught: 5.6 m (18 ft 4 in)
- Depth: 13.7 m (44 ft 11 in)
- Ramps: 2
- Installed power: 13500 hp
- Propulsion: NKK Pielstick 18PC2-6V. 1 set

SuperFerry 9 was a ferry owned by the Philippines-based carrier Aboitiz Transport System Corp (ATSC) and operated by their SuperFerry division. About 9 a.m. Sunday, September 6, 2009, she sank off the south-west coast of Zamboanga Peninsula with a total of 971 passengers and crew aboard.

The ferry was travelling from the southern city of General Santos to Iloilo City in the central Philippines and capsized on the other side of the peninsula from Zamboanga City.

On Tuesday September 8, 2009 the last missing passenger was reported rescued and more up-to-date figures were provided by disaster response officials. The civil defence figures were corrected the following night by the ship owners.

On 6pm Wednesday September 9, 2009, 961 crew members and passengers have been accounted for. Regretfully, there are 10 fatalities. 10 names in the official manifest cannot be physically matched but we also have 10 persons rescued and physically accounted for, whose names are not in the manifest".

== Design ==
The design places more emphasis on cargo carrying capacity. It is equipped with a large gantry crane on the deck, and features a wheelhouse that is one level higher. It is equipped with rampways on both sides of the stern and on the port bow, allowing trucks, passenger cars, etc. to be loaded onto the vehicle deck using a roll-on, roll-off system, while the bow deck is a container space where containers are loaded using a lift-on, lift-off system with a gantry crane.

== Ship history ==
=== Service History ===
She was formerly the first generation "Ariake" of Ooshima Transportation Co. Ltd. of Japan, also known as A" Line. She was built at the Usuki Iron Works Saiki Factory as a replacement for the Naminoue Maru (3rd generation), and entered service on the Tokyo - Naze (Amami island) - Naha (Okinawa) route on August 30, 1986. With the entry into service of this ship, the Naminoue Maru was transferred to the Kagoshima route, and the Emerald Amami, which had previously been in service on the Kagoshima route, was retired and sold to Amami Kaiun, becoming the Ferry Amami (1st generation).

With the launch of the Ariake (2nd generation), she was retired in September 1995, and was sold to William Lines Incorporated, and was refitted in Cebu City to become the fourth ship in the Mabuhay series of luxury ferries - the M/V Wilines Mabuhay 5. Even before sailing, she was already earmarked to replace the relatively slow M/V Maynilad in the Manila-Zamboanga-Davao route, with at least one newspaper already advertising this new development, promising "a totally different experience".

However, before her maiden voyage, William Lines, merged with Gothong Lines and Aboitiz Shipping Corporation to form WG&A Philippines Inc, and she never sailed under William Lines, and she conducted her maiden voyage as a SuperFerry.

In 2007, when WG&A, now Aboitiz Transport System sold off their vessels; SuperFerry 15, 16, 17, and, 18, MV SuperFerry 9 was refurbished and rebuilt, reducing her passenger capacity for more cargo.

As a WG&A, and later, Aboitiz Transport System, vessel, she was assigned to different routes. Her final assignment brought her to General Santos, and she was on her way to Iloilo when the SuperFerry 9 capsized and sank near the Zamboanga Peninsula in the early hours of September 6, 2009.

=== Previous problems ===
SuperFerry 9 had encountered several mishaps prior to its sinking.

In April 2006, the ship experienced repeated engine problems that caused passengers to be delayed a day and a half at sea while on a trip from Bacolod City to Manila's South Harbor.

In February 2007, engine problems stranded her at Daog Point on Negros Island while en route to Iligan City from Bacolod. She had to be towed back to port because of this mechanical failure. As a result of this incident, the Maritime Industry Authority revoked the safety certificate for the vessel. The agency also ordered the ship's owner, Aboitiz, to keep the vessel in drydock and to perform appropriate repairs.

On May 4, 2009 – about four months before the Zamboanga incident – the ship suffered from engine problems that caused 900 passengers to be stranded off Camiguin.

== Sinking ==
On September 6, 2009, SuperFerry 9 sank off the southwest coast of Zamboanga peninsula with 971 people on board. The ferry was travelling from the southern city of General Santos to Iloilo City in the central Philippines and capsized approximately 150 kilometres from Zamboanga City.

Below is a timeline of events (all times local).

- At 8:45 a.m. on September 5, 2009, SuperFerry 9 left General Santos bound for Iloilo City.
- Between 3:00 and 4:00 a.m. on September 6, 2009, a distress signal was sent by Captain Jose Yap that the ship was listing to the starboard side. An hour later, he ordered the passengers to abandon ship. Captain Yap was among those rescued in the disaster.
- At 5:20 a.m. the MV Myriad, a cargo ship also owned by Aboitiz, arrived at the scene of the incident to render assistance. After an hour, half of the passengers had already been taken off SuperFerry 9 and had boarded several life rafts.
- SuperFerry 9 sank sometime around 9:00 a.m., almost five hours after the first distress call was sent.

Initially the Coast Guard reported that the ship developed generator problems as soon as she left for Iloilo. According to Coast Guard chief Admiral Wilfredo Tamayo, initial reports said that the generator of SuperFerry 9 fluctuated several times. Passengers had reported loud heavy crashing noises and suggested cargo containers had moved in the hold damaging the hull.

On September 7, 2009, a military pilot reported an oil slick in the area where SuperFerry 9 sank. A containment ship was dispatched to the area. The vessel is believed to have settled on the seabed some 18 kilometres offshore at a depth of about 5000 metres.

As a result of the sinking, MARINA issued a suspension order September 7, grounding the whole fleet of ATSC. The company, however, successfully contested the whole of fleet order.

=== Survivors, fatalities and assistance to victims ===
Some of the 10 dead had been identified as of midnight on September 7. The ship's owner, Aboitiz Transport System Corp (ATSC), immediately arranged for medical, accommodation, counselling, and transport assistance, for the passengers and crew of the sunken vessel.

On September 7, 2009, survivor Lita Casumlum was found by search parties some eight miles (thirteen kilometers) from the site of the sinking. The last remaining passenger was brought to shore by fishing vessel on Tuesday September 8, severely injured.

SuperFerry 1 with 56 rescued passengers bound for Manila arrived at 2pm on September 9. As at 6pm Wednesday September 9, 2009, SuperFerry had already repatriated 760 rescued passengers and crew from rescue sites and Zamboanga city to their respective desired destinations. There were 62 rescued passengers who were scheduled to be repatriated the same day. 106 passengers were scheduled to be repatriated starting the following day. 23 rescued passengers were still being treated in various hospitals.

The Philippine Government's Maritime Safety Office, MARINA, quickly announced that all passengers would be entitled to 50,000 pesos compensation as a result of the sinking. Embarrassingly, they later had to back down from this position because it was not supported by law.

=== Inquiry ===
Official inquiries have commenced. Because of the location of the sunken vessel in the Sulu Sea, and its extreme depth of 5 kilometres below sea level, the inquiries will take months to complete, if they are conducted properly.

Unfortunately, the Philippines does not have a comprehensive Transport Safety Investigation Act, such as other countries in the region have. In addition, no authority in the Philippines is responsible for undertaking comprehensive investigations of all maritime accidents.

In the case of the SuperFerry 9 sinking, two separate authorities are reported to be conducting investigations into the sinking. The Philippine Coast Guard says it will conduct a Board of Marine Inquiry into the sinking. The Maritime Industry Authority also says it will conduct an inquiry into the sinking.

Whether one or both inquiries will be conducted, or whether either report will be comprehensive, remains to be seen. But given the Philippine government's prior history in this field, any comprehensive report at international best practice standard is unlikely.

The inherent safety of Ro-Ro vessels has been called into question in a number of Maritime Inquiries, especially in Europe, over the last 10 years or more. If there was a possibility of a design flaw in SuperFerry9, or any subsequent alteration to the vessel which could have compromised the inherent safety of the vessel, the wreck will need to be physically examined by experts. If the wreck is not thoroughly examined and comprehensive reports provided on it to any inquiry into the sinking, then any such Maritime Inquiry will be fundamentally flawed.

Given the large number of Ro-Ro vessels engaged in ferry transportation in the Philippines, and the current government's enthusiasm for Ro-Ro vessels, the question of inherent stability and safety, especially in high seas such as the Philippines experiences frequently each year, is of vital interest and importance to the Filipino travelling public.

== See also ==
- List of maritime disasters in the Philippines
