= Cebu Ferries =

Defunct ferry company in the Philippines

Cebu Ferries Corporation
- Company type: Subsidiary
- Industry: Ferry Services
- Founded: January 1, 1996; 30 years ago
- Defunct: January 1, 2012; 14 years ago
- Headquarters: Pier 4, North Reclamation Area, Cebu City 6000, Philippines
- Area served: Visayas and Mindanao
- Parent: WG&A Philippines Inc. (1996-2004); Aboitiz Transport System (2004-2012); Negros Navigation Co. Inc. (2010-2012)
- Website: www.cebuferries.com

Cebu Ferries was a shipping company based in Cebu City, Philippines. Its hubs were at Pier 4 in Cebu City. In 2012, Cebu Ferries and its sister companies; SuperFerry and SuperCat merged with Negros Navigation and rebranded as 2GO Travel.

Formerly the shipping company was a subsidiary of William Gothong & Aboitiz, better known as WG&A. Cebu Ferries was created to serve the VisMin Operations of WG&A. When WG&A split up, Jon Ramon Aboitiz retained Cebu Ferries and its sisters SuperCat Fast Ferry Corporation and SuperFerry. And Cebu Ferries became part of Aboitiz Transport System which was later purchased by Negros Navigation, which in turn was purchased by the Chinese government through its wholly owned private equity firm the China-Asean Investment Cooperation Fund and renamed 2GO Travel.

== Destinations ==
Before the merger in 2012, Cebu Ferries main port of call was Cebu. Other destinations are:

=== Visayas ===
- Dumaguete
- Ormoc
- Tacloban
- Jagna, Bohol

=== Mindanao ===
- Butuan (via Nasipit)
- Cagayan de Oro
- Iligan
- Ozamiz
- Surigao

== Vessels ==
During its history, Cebu Ferries operated the following vessels:

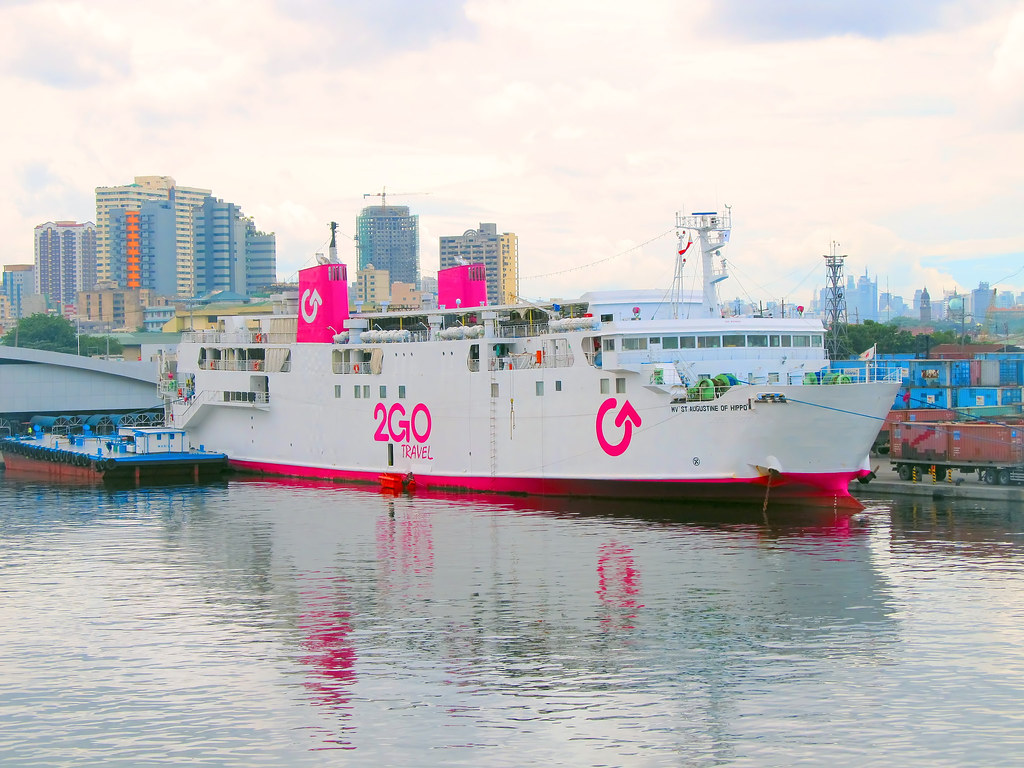
MV Cebu Ferry 1 as MV St. Augustine of Hippo

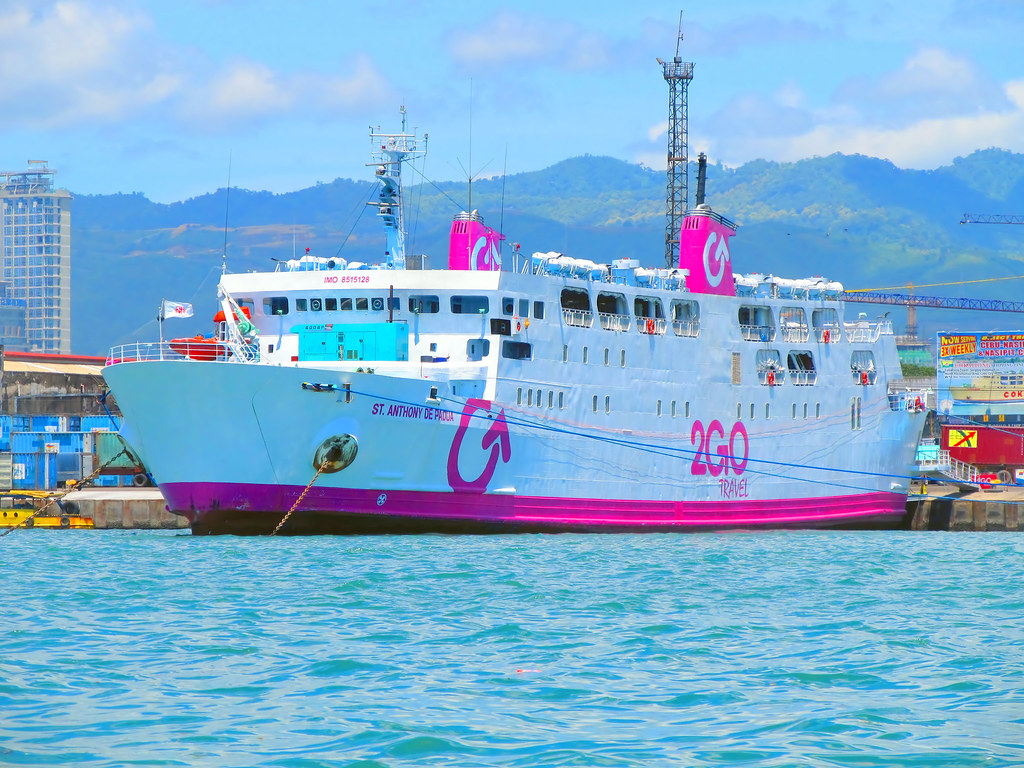
MV Cebu Ferry 2 as MV St. Anthony de Padua

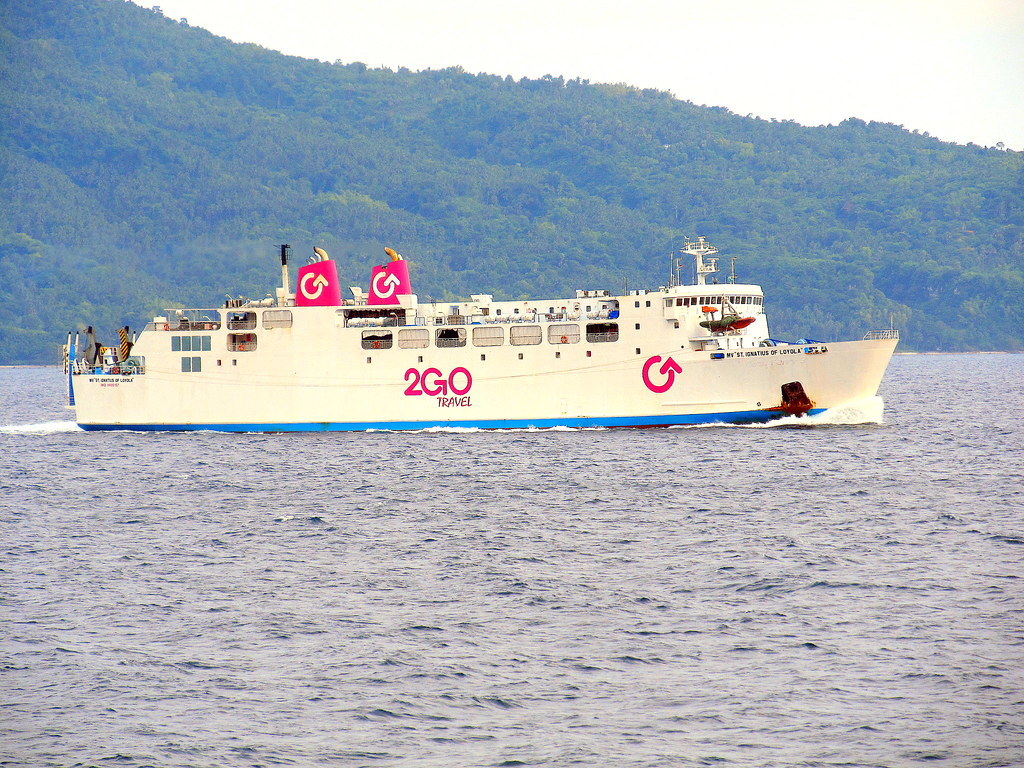
MV Cebu Ferry 3 as MV St. Ignatius of Loyola

=== Ferries ===
- Cebu Ferry 1 (renamed MV St. Augustine of Hippo under 2GO Travel. sold in 2024, sale cancelled in 2025 and is back in active service.)
- Cebu Ferry 2 (renamed MV St. Anthony de Padua under 2GO Travel, sold overseas in 2024 and became the Almaher.)
- Cebu Ferry 3 (renamed as MV St. Ignatius of Loyola, in active service under 2GO Travel.)
- Our Lady of Mount Carmel (sold to George and Peter Lines & renamed as MV GP Ferry 2, was later sold to Lite Shipping Corporation and was renamed to MV Lite Ferry Three.)
- Our Lady of Lourdes
- Our Lady of Montserrat
- Our Lady of Good Voyage (sold to Gothong Southern and renamed as MV Doña Conchita Sr., but was later sold to Trans-Asia Shipping Lines and was renamed as MV Trans-Asia 9, was sold to local breakers and was broken up in Cebu.)
- Our Lady of Manaoag
- Our Lady of Banneux
- Our Lady of Fatima
- Our Lady of Guadalupe
- Our Lady of the Rule (broken-up by ship breakers in Alang, India.)
- Our Lady of Lipa
- Our Lady of Akita 2
- Dona Cristina
- Dona Lili
- Don Calvino
- Misamis Occidental

=== Cargo Vessels ===
- Our Lady of Charity
- Our Lady of Rosary

== See also ==
- List of shipping companies in the Philippines
