= Negros Navigation =

Defunct shipping company in the Philippines

- Industry: Transport
- Founded: June 26, 1932; 94 years ago
- Defunct: 2018; 8 years ago
- Fate: Merged with 2GO Group
- Successor: 2GO Travel
- Headquarters: Pier 2 North Harbor, Tondo, Manila, Philippines
- Area served: Luzon, Visayas, Mindanao
- Products: Passenger and freight transport
- Website: negrosnavigation.ph

Negros Navigation Co., Inc. (NENACO) was one of the oldest domestic shipping companies in the Philippines. It was also one of the largest companies in the shipping business in the Philippines. Its main hub was in Pier 2, Manila North Harbor. In 2012, Its passenger and freight operations merged with Aboitiz Transport System (ATS) brands to form 2GO Travel. It later merged with 2GO Group in 2018.

== History ==
- 1932 - Negros Navigation incorporated on July 26. Small ferry vessels, "Marapara" and "San Carlos" purchased from Cesar Barrios and company together with their wharf in Silay.
- 1933 - Delivery of "Princess of Negros
- 1938 - "Princess of Negros" chartered by U.S. Army, etc. Operations suspended. Meanwhile, Banago wharf in Bacolod City heavily damaged.
- 1947 - PT boat acquired and named "Princess of Negros". Placed on Iloilo City-Silay route.
- 1950 - Banago wharf fully restored. Sister company Ledesma Shipping places "Don Julio on Iloilo-Bacolod-Manila route.
- 1954 - "Don Julio" purchased and placed on Iloilo-Bacolod route. "Florentina" placed on experimental Manila-Cavite ferry route.
- 1955 - "Florentina recalled to Iloilo-Bacolod route. "Don Julio" placed on Iloilo-Bacolod-Manila route.
- 1957 - Bacolod office opens.
- 1960 - Iloilo main office transfers to company-owned building at Muelle Loney, Iloilo,
- 1961 - New "Princess of Negros" ordered from Hong Kong
- 1963 - Big fire at Banago wharf. Delivery of "Dona Florentina" brand-new, high speed luxurious and efficient passenger-cargo vessel. Manila office opens at Intramuros. Banago wharf repaired and expanded.
- 1967 - New "Don Julio" delivered.
- 1969 - Brand new "Don Vicente delivered
- 1970 - Rice rations and emergency living allowance started for employees.
- 1971 - Brand new "Don Juan" delivered. Old "Princess of Panay" sold. Negros Navigation main headquarters moves to Manila. North Harbor operations transferred from Pier 4 to Pier 2.
- 1972 - Pier 2 Complex (First Modern Passenger Terminal) completed. Head office in Manila transferred to Makati.
- 1973 - "Connie", a second-hand all-cargo vessel, acquired.
- 1974 - "Dona Montserrat" (second-hand luxury cruise vesel) acquired.
- 1976 - "Don Claudio" acquired.
- 1980 - "Don Juan" is hit by a tanker M/T Tacloban City and sank on April 22. "Santa Maria" acquired.
- 1981 - "Connie II" acquired.
- 1983 - "M/S Don Florentina" catches fire. "M/S Sta. Florentina" purchased to take over the Manila-lloilo-Cagayan route.
- 1987 - Negros Navigation expands business landscape.
- 1988 - Purchase of "M/S Sta. Ana", a RoRo vessel, aimed to meet the growing volume of passengers and cargo in Western Visayas.
- 1989 - MARINA approves "M/S Sta. Maria" to ply the Manila-Romblon-lloilo and Manila-Roxas City. Bacolod City routes on a weekly basis and "M/S Sta. Florentina to procced to Cagayan de Oro from Bacolod.
- 1992 - "M/S Princess of Negros" and "M/S San Paolo" launched.
- 1994 - Negros Navigation becomes the first shipping company to be listed in the Philippine Stock Exchange.
- 1995 - A computerized online Cargo Reservation, Booking and Monitoring System is implemented. First fast ferries introduced in the Bacolod and Iloilo routes.
- 1996 - Banago Wharf becomes fully concretined and an ultra-modern passenger terminal is inaugurated. First and only labor strike in Negros Navigation history is staged illegally.
- 1997 - Delivery of giant flagship "M/S Mary Queen of Peace".
- 1999 - Negros Navigation obtains Document of Compliance from ABS-Pacific.
- 2001 - Negros Navigation main headquarters omved to Manila.
- 2004 - Negros Navigation delisted upon request of owners. Sulficio Tagud Jr. takes over Negros Navigation helm. Rehabilitation begins.
- 2008 - "San Agustin Uno (SNA)" vessel was acquired.
- 2009 - "San Rafael Uno (SR1)" and "San Rafael Dos (SR2)" were launched.
- 2010 - Negros Navigation acquired Aboitiz Transport System and its brands on December 1. The China-Asean Investment Cooperation Fund, a private equity fund wholly owned by the Government of the People's Republic of China through an equity infusion, gained a controlling interest in Negros Navigation
- 2011 - Delivery of new flagship "M/S St. Michael the Archangel".
- 2012 - Aboitiz Transport System rebranded to 2GO Group Inc. Negros Navigation's passenger operations were merged with the former ATS brands; SuperFerry, SuperCat, and Cebu Ferries to form 2GO Travel, transferred all operational activities to it while Negros Navigation becomes the holding company of 2GO Group.
- 2018 - Negros Navigation merged with 2GO Group.

== Legacy ==
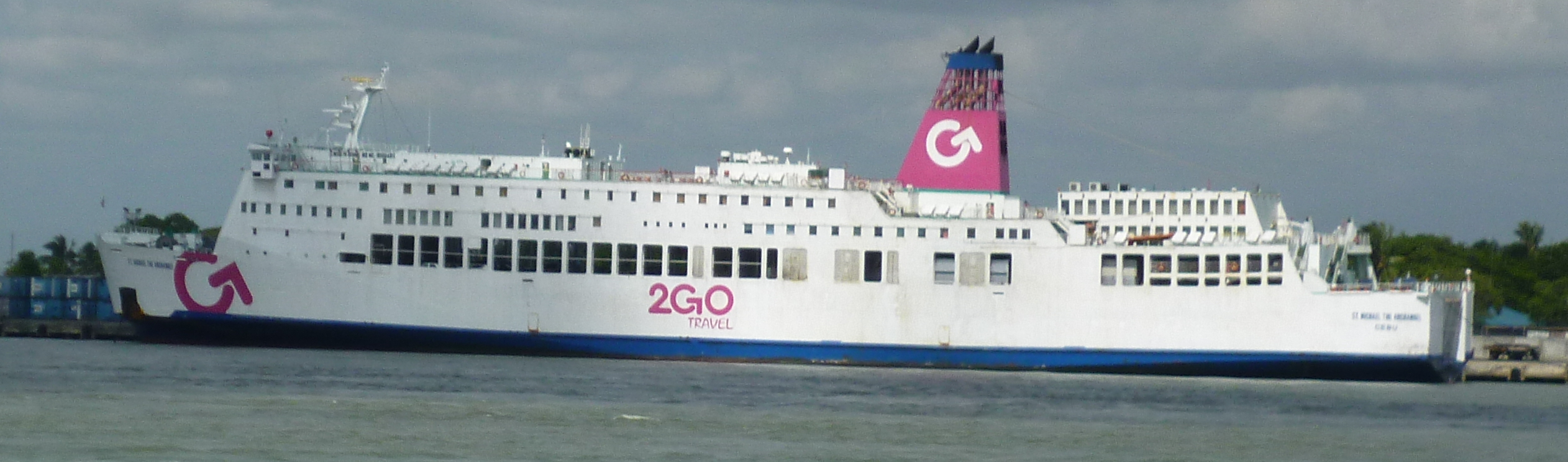
St Michael of the Archangel, the last Negros Navigation vessel still operating

Some of Negros Navigation's vessels were transferred to 2GO Travel. St. Michael of the Archangel is the last Negros Navigation vessel that is still operating but it will retire soon because of 2GO's Fleet Modernization Program. The sinking of the M/V Don Juan serves as an inspiration for the grandiose Masskara Festival in Bacolod. Banago Port, Bacolod City built by Negros Navigation during the 1940s is still operating and is used by FastCat for its Bacolod-Dumangas operations.

== Destinations ==
Negros Navigation served the following destinations during its history from 1932 to 2018. its main port of call was Manila Other destinations are:

=== Luzon ===
- Corregidor
- Cavite
- Coron, Palawan
- Puerto Princesa
- Romblon, Romblon

=== Visayas ===
- Bacolod
- Boracay
- Caticlan, Aklan
- Iloilo City
- Cebu City
- Dumaguete
- Dumaguit, Aklan
- Estancia, Iloilo
- Tagbilaran City, Bohol
- Jagna, Bohol
- Pulupandan, Negros Occidental
- Roxas City
- San Carlos, Negros Occidental
- Sicogon, Iloilo
- Silay, Negros Occidental

=== Mindanao ===
- Cagayan de Oro
- Butuan via Nasipit, Agusan del Norte
- Davao City
- Dipolog via Dapitan
- General Santos
- Iligan City, Lanao del Norte
- Ozamiz City, Misamis Occidental
- Zamboanga

=== International ===
- Hong Kong

== Vessels ==
This list includes the vessels that were operated by Negros Navigation.

=== Roll on Roll off (RORO) ===
- M/V St. Michael the Archangel - She was initially acquired by Negros Navigation in 2011 as their newest (and final) flagship. Before her service in the Philippines, she first served in Japan as the Blue Diamond (Japanese: ブルーダイヤモンド) for Diamond Ferry and in South Korea as Queen Mary for Seaworld Express Ferry. In 2012, she was operated by NENACO subsidiary 2GO Group until 2018 when NENACO and 2GO Group merged. The ship is now fully owned by 2GO Group. She is the sister ship of MV St. Francis Xavier, also acquired by 2GO in 2014.
- M/V St. Joseph the Worker - She previously served as Hankyu no. 24 for Japanese operator Hankyu Ferry. Later she was bought by Negros Navigation in 1999. In 2012, she was operated by NENACO subsidiary 2GO Group until she was finally sold and scrapped at Chittagong, Bangladesh in 2014, where she was named MV Joseph for her last voyage to the scrapyard. She is the sister ship of MV St. Peter the Apostle, another ship of Negros Navigation.
- M/V St. Peter the Apostle - She is previously known as Hankyu no. 32 for Japanese operator Hankyu Ferry. Later, she was bought by Negros Navigation in 1999. In 2012, she was operated by NENACO subsidiary 2GO Group until she was retired in 2014 and was sold and scrapped at Chittagong, Bangladesh. She was renamed MV Peter for her final voyage to the scrapyard. She is the sister ship of MV St. Joseph the Worker
- M/V St. Ezekiel Moreno - Built in 1973 in Japan as Miyasaki, was acquired by Negros Navigation in 1997 to serve as a ro-ro/passenger ferry in the Philippines before being sold for scrap and broken up in 2007.
- M/V St. Francis of Assisi - Built in 1975 by Hayashikane Shipbuilding in Nagasaki, Japan, as the MV Queen Coral No. 2 for Terukuni Yusen KK, later operated by Kansai Kisen KK under the name Queen Flower No. 2, acquired in 1994 by Negros Navigation, refitted slightly (added an open‑air economy deck) and used on inter‑island routes, including Iloilo City and Nasipit, caught fire while docked at Nasipit on January 26, 1999, and was subsequently towed to Cebu, where she was deemed beyond repair and broken up.
- M/V Mary, Queen of Peace - Built in 1974 in Japan by Naikai Zosen as Mimitsu Maru for Nippon Car Ferry in Japan, later transferred to Seacom Ferry and then Marine Express. Acquired by Negros Navigation in 1997. Under Negros Navigation, she became the flagship, boasting 36,000 horsepower, and operated on major inter-island routes including Manila–Cagayan de Oro. Her gross tonnage was officially re‑rated to 7,610 GRT, and passenger capacity raised to 2,158 in her Philippine service. Toward the end of her career, she was used as a floating hotel for Boracay (“Boracay Fun Ship”). Negros Navigation sold her in 2007 to overseas breakers to help pay off debts, and she was scrapped in Alang, India, in January 2008. According to ship‑breaking records, her demolition price was US$460 per ton.
- M/V San Lorenzo Ruiz - Built in 1973 by Nipponkai Heavy Industries in Toyama, Japan as Al Nasl for Taiheiyo Enkai Ferry KK, later renamed Ebino under Nippon Car Ferry in Japan. Acquired by Negros Navigation in 1996, renamed San Lorenzo Ruiz. Modified in Philippine service, a partial deck added for economy passengers capacity declared at 1,426 pax, down‑rated gross tonnage to 6,051 GRT, DWT increased to 2,995 tons. Sold by Negros Navigation in 2005 (inactive since around Sept 12) for about US$1.6 million sent for scrapping in Bangladesh, sold at US$460/ton.
- M/V San Paolo - Built in 1971 by Nippon Kokan (Shimizu, Japan) as Saintpaulia, came into service with Seacom Ferry and later Marine Express in Japan. Acquired by Negros Navigation in 1993, renamed San Paolo. She was well-known and featured in Negros Navigation's promotions. In June 2011, she was sold to DTA Ship Trading LLC (UAE) and renamed Paolo. Finally broken up in August 2011 in Xinhui, China by Jiangmen Yinhu Ship Breaking.
- M/S Santa Ana - Originally built in 1973 by Imabari Shipyard, Japan as Ferry Muroto, acquired by Negros Navigation in 1988 and renamed M/S Sta. Ana. In 2005, she was renamed Super Shuttle Ferry 8 and served the Cebu–Bacolod–Iloilo–Puerto Princesa route, was later sold for demolition in India.
- M/S Santa Florentina - Built in 1972 in Japan as Okudōgo by Kochi Jyuko for the Ehime-Hanshin Ferry, where she ran between the cities of Kobe and Imabari. She was later chartered to Diamond Ferry Co. Ltd, and placed in the Kobe-Oita route via Matsuyama. Acquired by Negros Navigation and began Philippine service in December 1983, sold to breakers in June 2006.
- M/S Santa Maria - Originally built in 1973 by Yoshiura Shipbuilding, Kure, Japan, as Hayabusa No. 3, later renamed Hayabusa No. 8 under the same Japanese owner. In 1980, she was sold to Negros Navigation, renamed Sta. Maria, becoming one of their first RORO liners, operated on routes including Manila–Iloilo–Bacolod and later regional services such as Cebu–Iloilo–Puerto Princesa and Iloilo–Bacolod. In 2000, she was sold to George & Peter (G&P) Lines, where she became GP Ferry-1, serving routes like Cebu–Dumaguete–Dapitan. In 2007, Lite Shipping Corporation (Lite Ferries) acquired her and she was renamed Lite Ferry 8 and is currently in active service.
- M/S Princess of Negros (5th generation) - Built in July 1973 by Shin Kochi Jyuko in Kochi, Japan, under the name Okudogo No. 2, acquired by Negros Navigation (NENACO) in 1992, becoming Princess of Negros. Financial troubles hit NENACO around the 2000s as the company restructured, Princess of Negros was laid up in Manila. On 6 April 2007, she was sold to ship-breakers in Chittagong, Bangladesh, and broken up there.

=== Cruisers ===
- M/V Don Julio - Built in 1967 by Maizuru Shipyard in Kyoto, Japan, delivered as a fast cruiser liner for Negros Navigation, Took part in rescue operations after the MV Don Juan disaster, she helped recover survivors and remains. Later transferred to Jensen Shipping Corporation, by the 2000s, she was laid up and eventually her fate became untracked.
- M/V Don Claudio - Built in 1965 by Sanosayu Dock Co., Ltd. in Japan as Okinoshima Maru, originally owned by Kansai Kisen KK in Japan. Purchased by Negros Navigation in 1976 and renamed Don Claudio, transferred later to Jensen Shipping Corporation. Notably, Don Claudio's crew witnessed the MV Doña Paz disaster on December 20, 1987, and rescued 24 passengers and 2 crew using nets. Reported to have been scrapped in 2003.
- M/V Don Juan - Built in 1971 by Niigata Engineering Co., Ltd. in Japan for Negros Navigation, named after Don Juan L. Ledesma, eldest child of one of the company's founders. On 22 April 1980, while en route from Manila to Bacolod, it collided with the oil tanker MT Tacloban City (PNOC) off Tablas Strait, Mindoro, and sank.
- M/V Don Vicente Built by Niigata Shipbuilding in Niigata, Japan, and delivered brand-new to Negros Navigation in 1969, Eventually, retired and sold for scrap after decades of service.
- M/V Doña Florentina - Built in 1965 by Hitachi Shipbuilding & Engineering in Osaka, Japan, it was Negros Navigation's first “Dona”‑series luxury liner, representing a push toward more modern, air-conditioned liners. On May 18, 1983, she caught fire off Batbatan Island, Antique. After the fire, she was beached and later towed to Batangas, where she was broken up in March 1985.

=== Cruise Ship ===
- M/V Doña Monserrat - Built in 1967 by SECN in Navantia, Matagorda, Spain as Cabo Izarra for Ybarra Line, acquired by NENACO in 1974. Operated special cruise and liner routes for NENACO, Manila to Corregidor, Iloilo, Zamboanga, Davao and also cruises for tourists to Sicogon, and had sailings to Hong Kong. The ship is very expensive to operate, especially during fuel crises NENACO reportedly struggled to make her profitable, around 1979, she was sold to China as West Star, scrapped in Guangzhou, China as Xinghu.

=== High Speed Craft ===
- St. Michael - Built in 1988 in Australia, started operations with Negros Navigation in 1996, eventually sold to R&D Philippines, converted to an offshore support and supply vessel and renamed to MV Sayah.

=== Cargo Vessels ===
- M/V San Agustin Uno (acquired by 2GO in 2012, sold overseas)
- M/V San Rafael Uno (acquired by 2GO in 2012, sold overseas)
- M/V San Rafael Dos (currently active under 2GO)
- M/V Nossa Senhora De Fatima (Retired and sold)
- M/V Connie (Retired and sold to breakers)
- M/V Connie II (Retired and sold to breakers)
- M/V San Sebastian (Retired and sold to breakers)

=== Other Passenger Vessels ===
- M/S Marapara (Sold to Breakers)
- M/S Princess of Panay (Sold to breakers)
- M/S Princess of Mindoro (Sold to breakers)
- M/S Princess of Negros (1st generation (Retired and sold)
- M/S Princess of Negros (2nd generation (Retired and sold)
- M/S Princess of Negros (3rd generation) (Lost during World War II)
- M/S Princess of Negros (4th generation) (Retired and sold to breakers)
- M/S Princess of Cebu (Retired and sold)

== NN Sea Angels ==
Sea Angels Ferry Corporation (also known as NN Sea Angels) was the fast-craft subsidiary of Negros Navigation established in the 1990s, and in 1997 it was merged with Universal Aboitiz, Inc (SuperCat). and Parkview Holdings to form the Philippine Fast Ferry Corporation, the precursor of today's SuperCat fast-ferry operations.

Sea Angels Ferry Corporation
- Transit type: High Speed Ferry
- Owner: Negros Navigation Co. Inc (NENACO)
- Began operation: 1996; 30 years ago
- Ended operation: September 4, 1998; 28 years ago (Merged with SuperCat to for Philippine Fast Ferry Corporation)
- No. of vessels: 4
- No. of terminals: 7

=== History ===
Before the Sea Angels fleet was established, Negros Navigation already operated a high-speed catamaran, the MV St. Michael, which the company acquired in early 1996 to compete with the Bacolod Express services of Cardinal Philippine Carrier and Bullet Express in the Bacolod-Iloilo City route.

The company flourished in 1996, the same year Negros Navigation made its initial public offering on the Philippine Stock Exchange, and with the fresh capital and reports that Cebu-based SuperCat Fast Ferry Corporation (a joint venture of Universal Aboitiz Inc. and Hong Kong based CTS Park View Co. Ltd.) planned to enter the Bacolod–Iloilo route so the company invested in brand-new, faster high-speed catamarans to maintain its competitive edge, launching them under the NN Sea Angels brand.

Negros Navigation then ordered four Flying Cat 40-series high-speed catamarans from Norwegian shipbuilder Kværner Fjell’s Singapore yard, the same model purchased by Cebu-based Water Jet Shipping Corporation. The first vessels, FC St. Raphael and FC St. Gabriel were delivered in June 1996, followed shortly after by Angel of Hope and Angel of Freedom for the Sea Angels fleet.

However, problems soon emerged due to the vessels’ waterjet propulsion systems, which were expensive and difficult to maintain, and with competition on the Bacolod–Iloilo route intensifying, Negros Navigation entered into a partnership with Sembawang Maritime and Water Jet Shipping Corporation in March 1997 to form WaterJet Angels, consolidating the operations of Sea Angels and WaterJet so both companies could strengthen their position against other high-speed operators, particularly SuperCat.

On September 4, 1998, Sea Angels merged with Universal Aboitiz Inc. and Hong Kong Park View Holdings to form the Philippine Fast Ferry Corporation. SuperCat also acquired the 2 vessels of Waterjet Shipping Corporation (owned by Waterjet Netherlands Antilles). They renamed it as SuperCat 17 (former Waterjet 1) and SuperCat 18 (former Waterjet 2). The merger was eventually dissolved in 2002 and SuperCat became solely owned by Aboitiz. The Sea Angels fleet were consolidated to SuperCat.

=== Vessels ===
- St. Raphael - The ship was built in 1996 by Kvaerner Fjellstrand at their Singapore yard and delivered to Negros Navigation, renamed SuperCat 11 under SuperCat Fast Ferry Corporation, later sold to Italian Shipping Company Ustica Lines, renamed as Federica M. It is the sister ship of St Gabriel (later SuperCat 12 and Gabrielle M)
- St. Gabriel - The ship was built in 1996 by Kvaerner Fjellstrand at their Singapore yard and delivered to Negros Navigation, renamed SuperCat 12 under SuperCat Fast Ferry Corporation, later sold to Italian Shipping Company Ustica Lines, renamed as Gabrielle M. It is the sister ship of St Raphael (later SuperCat 11 and Federica M)
- Angel of Hope - The ship was built in 1996 by Kvaerner Fjellstrand at their Singapore yard and delivered to Negros Navigation, later sold to South Korea, renamed as Geomundo Sarang and later, Dongyang Gold. It is the sister ship of Angel of Freedom.
- Angel of Freedom - The ship was built in 1996 by Kvaerner Fjellstrand at their Singapore yard and delivered to Negros Navigation, later sold overseas, and operated multiple names until its finally renamed to Hudavendgar in Turkey. It is the sister ship of Angel of Hope.

=== Routes ===
Sea Angels primarily served the Bacolod and Iloilo City routes, but following its partnership with Water Jet, some of its vessels operated services connecting Cebu City with Cagayan de Oro, Tagbilaran, Larena, and Dumaguete.

- Bacolod - Iloilo City v.v.
- Cebu - Cagayan de Oro v.v.
- Cebu - Tagbilaran v.v.
- Cebu - Larena v.v.
- Cebu - Dumaguete v.v.

== Incidents ==
- On April 22, 1980, MV Don Juan, which was bound for Bacolod City, sank 20 nautical miles (37 km) off Maestre de Campo Island, Romblon after colliding with the oil tanker M/T Tacloban City. Reported casualties were 18 dead and 115 missing, with 745 survivors. This incident later served as an inspiration for the grandiose MassKara Festival of Bacolod.
- In 1997, M/S St. Francis of Assisi burned in the Port of Nasipit in Agusan Del Norte.

== See also ==
- Cebu Ferries
- Montenegro Lines
- Gothong Southern
- Supercat Fast Ferry Corporation (SFFC)
- Roble Shipping Inc.
