= SuperFerry =

Defunct ferry brand in the Philippines

SuperFerry Travel & Leisure SuperFerry
- SuperFerry logo from 2005 to 2012.

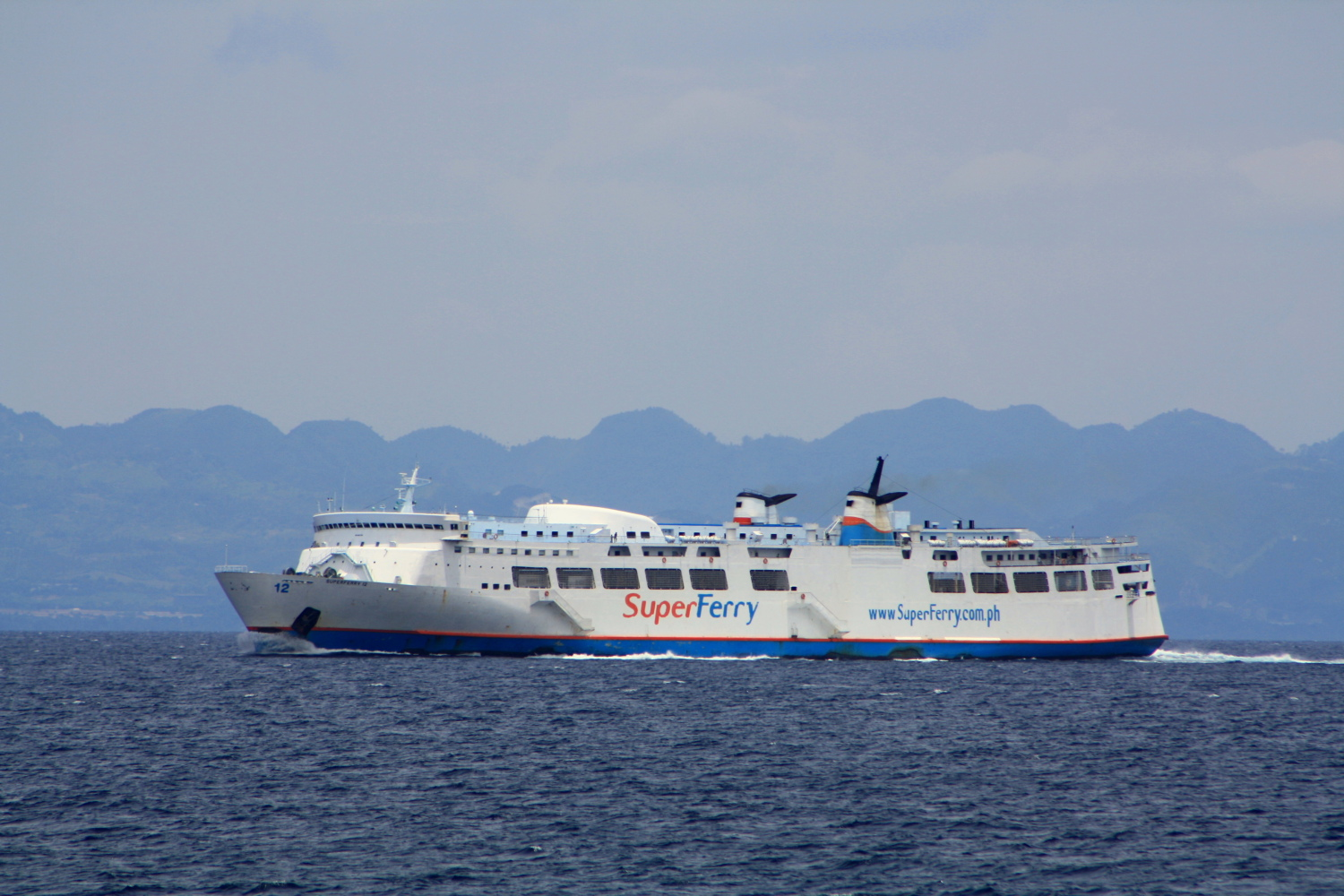
- MV SuperFerry 12, the largest ship and flagship of the SuperFerry brand.
- Product type: Inter-Island transport
- Current owner: Negros Navigation Co. (NENACO) (2010-2012)
- Country: Philippines
- Introduced: April 20, 1990; 36 years ago
- Discontinued: January 1, 2012; 14 years ago
- Markets: Luzon, Visayas, and Mindanao
- Previous owners: Aboitiz Shipping Corporation (1989-1996); WG&A Philippines Inc. (1996-2004); Aboitiz Transport System (2004-2012)
- Tagline: Tripid 'To! happy trip! Sakay Na!
- Website: www.SuperFerry.com.ph

SuperFerry Travel & Leisure, or SuperFerry, (formerly known as Aboitiz SuperFerry and later, WG&A SuperFerry) was the passenger travel and leisure brand of the Aboitiz Transport System Corporation (ATSC) and later, Negros Navigation Co. (NENACO), and was one of the largest ferry operators in the Philippines. It is now part of 2GO Travel.

Through Aboitiz-Jebsen, SuperFerry had the honor of being the first shipping company in the Philippines to receive the International Ship Management Code, SuperFerry's entire fleet was also compliant with the International Ship and Port Facility Security Code.

== History ==
- April 20, 1990 - Aboitiz Shipping Corporation introduced the Aboitiz SuperFerry brand by launching the M/V Aboitiz SuperFerry 1.
- January 1, 1996 - Aboitiz Shipping Corporation merged with William Lines Inc. and Carlos A. Gothong Lines to form WG&A Philippines Inc. the Aboitiz SuperFerry brand was retained under its new name WG&A SuperFerry.
- 2002-2004 - Aboitiz buys the shares of William Lines Inc. and Carlos A. Gothong Lines making it a subsidiary of Aboitiz Equity Ventures. later in February 2004, WG&A Philippines Inc. was renamed to the Aboitiz Transport System Corporation (ATSC) and the brand was again retained.
- March 8, 2005 - WG&A SuperFerry was rebranded to SuperFerry Travel & Leisure and adopted the blue and orange color scheme.
- December 1, 2010 - ATSC's parent company, Aboitiz Equity Ventures and Aboitiz and Company Inc. sold the company and its brands to Negros Navigation Co. Inc. (NENACO), for US$105 million. It included SuperFerry and its sister brands.
- January 1, 2012 - ATSC was rebranded to 2GO Group Inc. meanwhile, SuperFerry and its sister brands, SuperCat and Cebu Ferries merged with the Negros Navigation brand and formed 2GO Travel.

== Destinations ==
The following ports of call were served by SuperFerry throughout its history. Its main port of call was Manila. Other destinations are:

=== Luzon ===
- Batangas
- Coron
- Masbate
- Puerto Princesa
- Manila

=== Visayas ===
- Bacolod
- Batan, Aklan
- Boracay
- Catbalogan
- Cebu
- Dumaguete
- Dumaguit
- Iloilo City
- Isabel, Leyte
- Ormoc City
- Palompon
- Roxas City
- Tacloban

=== Mindanao ===
- Nasipit, Agusan del Norte
- Cagayan de Oro
- Cotabato
- Davao
- Dipolog City
- General Santos
- Iligan, Lanao del Norte
- Ozamiz
- Surigao City
- Zamboanga City

== Historical fleet ==
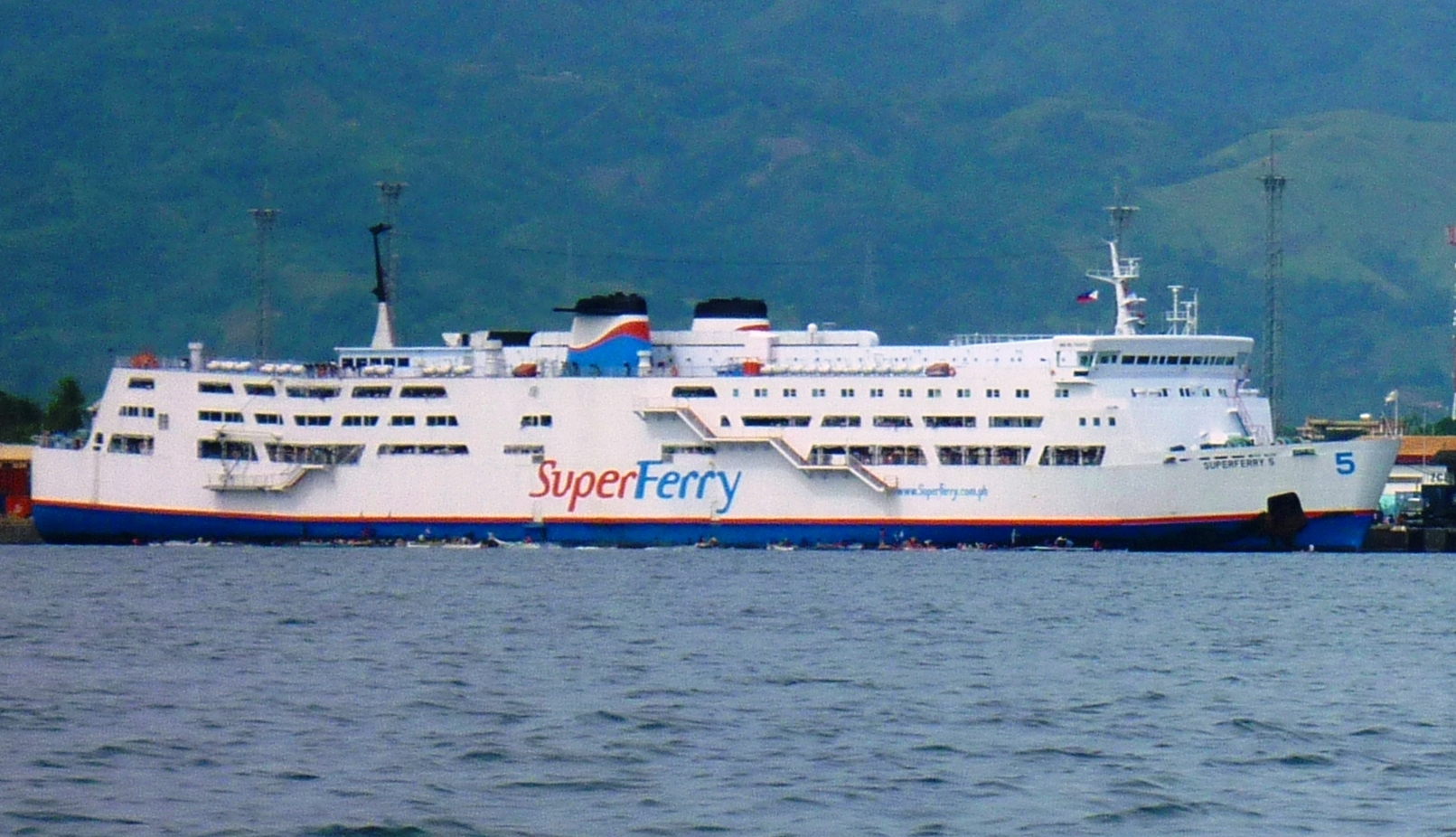
MV SuperFerry 5

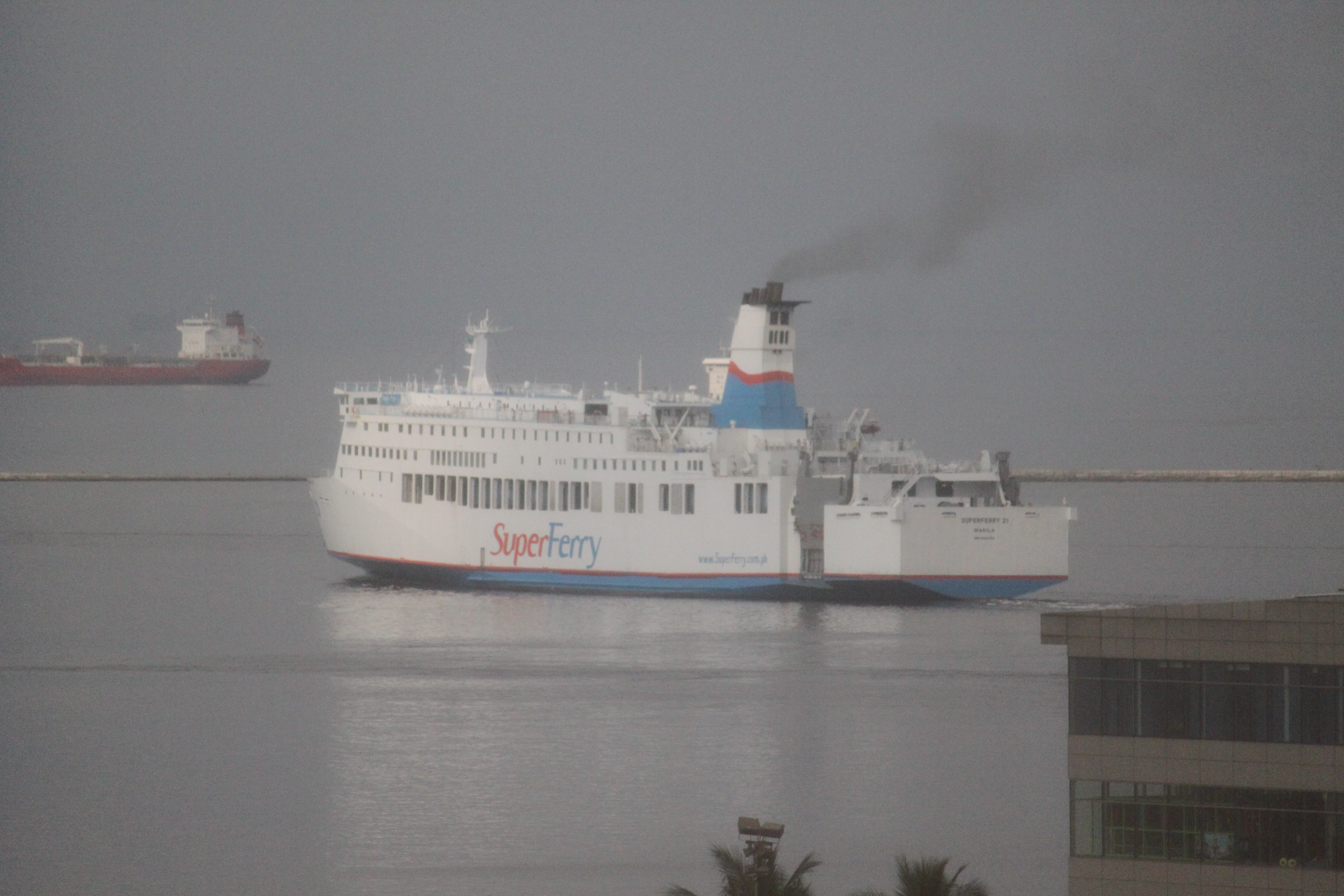
MV SuperFerry 21

SuperFerry has operated 27 vessels during its lifetime:

=== SuperFerries ===
- SuperFerry 1 (1989–2012) - She was originally built as the Venus, in by Shikoku Dockyard in Takamatsu, Japan. She was completed in December 1975 and she was then delivered to Arimura Sangyo shipping line of Naha, Okinawa, Japan. In 1989, Aboitiz Shipping Corporation bought the Venus and brought her to the Philippines where she was rebuilt. New decks were added and it now totaled four and additional passenger accommodations were built. She served as a SuperFerry for years until she was transferred and renamed M/V St. Rita de Casia by 2GO Travel and eventually sold to the Indonesian shipping company, Atosim Lampung Pelayaran PT and was renamed KM Mutiara Persada 1. In 2021, she was sold to local shipbreakers in Indonesia.
- SuperFerry 2 (1993–2012) - She was originally built as the Ferry Sumiyoshi (Japanese: フェリーすみよし) of Meimon Car Ferry (later as Meimon Taiyo Ferry) (Japanese: 名門大洋フェリー, romanized: Meimon Taiyō Ferī) in Japan. She was the sister ship of Ferry Hakozaki which was later sold later in 1994 to Aboitiz Shipping Corporation and was renamed as M/V SuperFerry 5 and later as the M/V St. Joan of Arc of 2GO Travel. In April 1992 she came to the Philippines to become the M/V Aboitiz SuperFerry 2 of Aboitiz Shipping Corporation and served under the brand until in 2012 when she was transferred and renamed M/V St. Thomas Aquinas by 2GO Travel. collided with M/V Sulpicio Express Siete of Philippine Span Asia Carrier Corporation (Formerly Sulpicio Lines), on August 16, 2013, and sank near Talisay in Cebu Province.
- SuperFerry 3 (1993–2000) - She was originally built as the Hamayu for the Japanese ferry company, Miyazaki Car Ferry. She was acquired by Aboitiz Shipping Corporation in 1993 and became the SuperFerry 3. In 2000, she had fire incident while the vessel was undergoing ship repairs in Keppel Cebu Shipyard, hot works on certain parts of the ship started a fire and caused evasive damages, effectively gutting the whole vessel. WG&A later held the shipyard owners liable for the incident. The ship was later broken up.
- SuperFerry 5 (1994–2012) - She was originally commissioned in 1973 as the Ferry Hakozaki of Japanese shipping line Meimon Car Ferry, and was built by Onomichi Shipbuilding in Hiroshima, Japan. In 1992, the ship was sold back to Onomichi Shipbuilding and was renamed as the Ferry Cosmo, and was chartered to Kansai Kisen Kaisha until 1994. She was acquired by the Aboitiz Shipping Corporation in 1994, its final acquisition before it formed the WG&A consortium with Carlos A. Gothong Lines and William Lines. The ship was then renamed to SuperFerry 5. Transferred to 2GO Travel and renamed M/V St. Joan of Arc; was retired from service and sold to breakers in Alang, India.
- SuperFerry 6 (1996–2000) - She was originally built as Ferry Tone and later, Ferry Shirayuri of Higashi-Kyu Ferry (East Ferry) in Japan. In 1993, she was acquired by Carlos A Gothong Lines as the Our Lady of Akita In 1996, she was transferred to WG&A SuperFerry and renamed SuperFerry 6 after the WG&A merger. In 2000, an engine fire on its starboard side swept the ship while en route to Manila from General Santos, October 2000; all of the 862 passengers and 168 crew were saved and the fire brought under control, but the ship was a total loss.
- SuperFerry 7 (1996–1997) - Former Naminoue Maru of A" Line in Japan, and built in 1980, she was sold to William Lines in 1992 and renamed the Mabuhay 2 and had her maiden voyage on October 23, 1992; later becoming a part of the SuperFerry fleet as part of the William, Gothong, and Aboitiz Shipping lines merger and was renamed SuperFerry 7. She was eventually lost to an extensive fire incident in 1997, wherein the whole vessel was gutted due to a presumed electrical fire while docked at Pier 4; same incident that would happen to her fleetmate SuperFerry 3 later in 2000, but this time, was caused by hot works around the ship. She only spent 3 years sailing under the Philippine flag after the acquisition from Japan.
- SuperFerry 8/19 (1996–2011) - Built in 1977 as M/V Akebono Maru of A” Line shipping by Usuki Iron Works Ltd. in their Saiki, Japan shipyard. Sold in 1989 to William Lines and was renamed into M/V Sugbu. She was refurbished in Singapore and was renamed into Mabuhay 3 and eventually SuperFerry 8. Renamed into SuperFerry 19 after she was re-engined in Singapore in 2004. She was leased in 2006 by Peninsula, a shipping company in Papua New Guinea; temporarily renamed into Milne Bay. She later came back to SuperFerry. Was eventually sold to Jiangmen Xinhui Shipbreaking Co. Ltd; a shipbreaking company in China in 2011.
- SuperFerry 9 (1996–2009) - Built in 1986 by Usuki Iron Works Ltd. at Saiki, Japan, and launched as the Ariake, it was later acquired by William Lines Incorporated in 1995 and renamed as Mabuhay 5. but before her maiden voyage in the Philippines, the ship was renamed SuperFerry 9. And she never entered service under William Lines and has been part of the SuperFerry fleet ever since. It was known to be a problematic ship, with engine problems causing delays and stranding of passengers. In 2009, due to a presumed rough sea conditions and shifting of cargo containers below decks, it capsized off the southwest coast of Zamboanga Peninsula while en route from General Santos to Iloilo and sank almost 5 hours after the first distress call sent by the captain. All 968 passengers and crew were accounted for. There were 10 fatalities.
- SuperFerry 10 (1996–2002) - Built in 1973 as the Sun Flower 5 (Japanese: さんふらわあ5), one of the legendary Sun Flower ships of Japan's Blue Highway Line. She was later acquired and became the flagship of William Lines as the Mabuhay 1, part of their luxury liners to compete with former rival Sulpicio Lines. After the merger, and was renamed SuperFerry 10, and she became WG&A's flagship for a short time, until the arrival of SuperFerry 12. She was eventually sold to breakers in China in 2002, still in perfectly good working condition, as a casualty of WG&A's liquidation of ships after the merger break-up. She only managed to sail for 9 years in Philippine waters after the William Lines acquisition.
- SuperFerry 11 (1996–1999) - She was formerly the Kobe Maru of Oshima Transportation in Japan. She was sold to Gothong Lines in 1995 and was renamed to Our Lady of Akita 2. but before her maiden voyage in the Philippines, the ship was renamed to SuperFerry 11 and she never entered service under Gothong and became a SuperFerry instead. In 1999, she was renamed to Our Lady of Banneux and transferred to SuperFerry's sister company, Cebu Ferries. At the same year, she was involved in a grounding incident near Matalom, Southern Leyte on 29 December. According to some accounts, this was only her second voyage on the said route. She was later sold and broken up in 2003
- SuperFerry 12 (1996–2012) - SuperFerry 12 was the former New Miyako of Hankyu Ferry of Japan and was sold to WG&A in 1996 and renamed to SuperFerry 12, and subsequently replaced SuperFerry 10 as the flagship in the same year as she arrived. She was involved in a collision with the passenger-cargo boat M/V San Nicholas in 2003. She was later repaired and was later transferred to 2GO Travel in 2012. She was eventually sold to breakers in Chittagong, Bangladesh in 2021.
- SuperFerry 14 (2000–2004) - Built in 1981, as the White Sanpo 2, and was later acquired by WG&A in October 2000 and was advertised as a "Festival" ship for her many on-board amenities. On February 27, 2004, at around 12:50 midnight, while the ferry was sailing from Manila bound for Cagayan de Oro, an explosion tore through the vessel, starting a fire that engulfed the ship and caused many fatalities. The ferry later capsized half-submerged, further hampering rescue and retrieval operation of survivors and missing persons. Upon investigation, a Rajah Sulaiman Movement member confessed to planting a bomb which was triggered by a timing device on board for the Abu Sayyaf group, confirming a terrorist attack. The disaster was featured in various international news and media due to its magnitude and terrorism nature. All in all, of the 899 recorded passengers and crew on board, there were 116 fatalities, 53 remained missing and presumed dead. The ship was deemed a total loss by the company and was later broken up.
- SuperFerry 15 (2002–2007) - She started her career as and later as Ferry Kyoto for the Japanese operator Meimon Taiyō Ferry. In 2002, she was acquired by WG&A Philippines where she was named as MV SuperFerry 15 to better compete with its archrival, Sulpicio Lines. After a brief service in the Philippines, she was sold in 2007 to LYG C-K Ferry and became CK Star in China, and was later sold to breakers in Alang, India.
- SuperFerry 16 (2002–2007) - She started her career as New Orion (Japanese: ニューおりおん) and later as Ferry Fukuoka (Japanese: フェリーふくおか) for the Japanese operator Meimon Taiyō Ferry. In 2002, she was acquired by WG&A Philippines where she was named as MV SuperFerry 16 to better compete with its archrival, Sulpicio Lines. After a brief service in the Philippines, she was sold in 2007 to CMM Maritime in China, renamed to Queen Qingdao and later, New Qingdao. She was later sold and renamed to New Blue Ocean under Stena Daea Line and eventually was sold in 2016 to 2GO Travel. The vessel was renamed to M/V St. Therese of the Child Jesus. She was the last SuperFerry vessel sailing on Philippine waters until in 2024 when she was retired and sold to a shipbroker and was renamed to Al Jadara.
- SuperFerry 17 (2003–2007) - She was built in 1988 as the New Harima of Hankyu Ferry in Japan. She was sold to WG&A in 2003 and became the SuperFerry 17. In 2007, she was sold to Huadong Shipping and was renamed to Huadong Pearl III. In 2010, she was sold once more to Iscomar and renamed to Isabel Del Mar, and later sold and broken up in AliağaTurkey, 2014.
- SuperFerry 18 (2003–2007) - She was built in 1988 as the New Seto of Hankyu Ferry in Japan. She was sold to WG&A in 2003 and became the SuperFerry 18. In 2007, she was sold to Huadong Shipping and was renamed to Huadong Pearl VI, and was later sold to breakers in Chittagong, Bangladesh, 2017.
- SuperFerry 20 (2010–2012) - Formerly M/V Sunflower Kogane acquired from Diamond Ferry and was renamed to M/V SuperFerry 21 she was later renamed to M/V St. Gregory the Great under 2GO Travel, ran aground in near Guimaras and sold to breakers.
- SuperFerry 21 (2010–2012) - Formerly M/V Sunflower Nishiki from Kansai Kisen Co., Ltd.; was acquired by Aboitiz Transport System and renamed to M/V SuperFerry 21 and was later renamed to M/V St. Leo the Great under 2GO Travel. She was eventually sold to breakers in Chittagong, Bangladesh in 2021.

=== Ferries ===
- M/V Our Lady of Medjugorje (1996–2007) - She was originally built as a RORO cargo vessel, named Shinka Maru of Kuribayashi Kisen K.K. She was acquired by Gothong Lines in 1990 and was converted into a RORO passenger vessel and was renamed to Sto. Nino de Cebu and later, Our Lady of Medjugorje. In 1996, she was transferred under WG&A and retained its name. In 2007, she was sold to PT Jembatan Nusantara in Indonesia and renamed to KM Makhota Nusantara.
- M/V Our Lady of Sacred Heart (1996–2005) - She was originally built as a RORO cargo vessel, named Shinsei Maru of Kuribayashi Kisen K.K. She was acquired by Gothong Lines in 1990 and was converted into a RORO passenger vessel and was renamed to Our Lady of Sacred Heart. In 1996, she was transferred under WG&A and retained its name. In 2002, she was transferred to Cebu Ferries, but was eventually retired and sold to breakers.
- M/V Our Lady of Good Voyage (1996–1999; 2007–2010) - Her first name was the Ferry Kikai of Arimura Sangyo Lines (later became A" Line). She was later acquired by William Lines Inc. in 1995 and renamed as Mabuhay 6. but after only a few voyages, the ship was renamed Our Lady of Good Voyage under WG&A. She was transferred to its subsidiary, Cebu Ferries. In 2007, she was transferred to SuperFerry as a reliver vessel until in 2010, she was sold to Gothong Southern and was named the Dona Conchita. When Gothong Southern decided to let go of their passenger operations, she was sold to Trans-Asia Shipping Lines and was named Trans Asia 9. In 2021, she was scrapped in TASLI Wharf at F F. Cruz Mandaue City, Cebu.
- M/V Our Lady of Lipa (1996–2005) - She was built in 1971 as the Kuroshio Maru and later Kurushima 7 under Kansai Kisen Kaisha in Japan. she was acquired by Gothong Lines in 1995 and was assigned to the Cebu-Cagayan de Oro-Cebu route where she earned the distinction as one of the fastest ships to serve there. However, just after a few voyages, she was transferred to Cebu Ferries, and was rumored to be the main reason why Sulpicio Lines fielded the liner-sized Princess of the Ocean to that heavily contested route in 1997. She was later transferred to WG&A Ferries and in 2005, she was retired and sold to breakers in Alang, India
- M/V Our Lady of Naju (1996–1999) - She was originally built as Hikari of Oshima Unyu K.K. The ship was built by Mitsubishi Heavy Industries (MHI) in their Shimonoseki shipyard in 1972. In 1994, she was sold to Gothong Lines and was renamed to Our Lady of Naju. She joined the WG&A fleet when the Great Merger happened in 1996. In 2003, she was eventually sold to breakers in China.
- M/V Doña Virginia (1996) - She was originally built by Mitsubishi Heavy Industries in their Shimonoseki yard in 1973 as the Shin Sakura Maru for the Japanese shipping company Oshima Unyu (Oshima Transportation). In 1979 she was acquired by William Lines Inc. and renamed to Doña Virginia, named after the owning family matriarch, Dona Virginia Chiongbian. She succeeded another ship of the company, the MV Cebu City, as the flagship of the fleet. In 1996 she was transferred to WG&A but was retired and sold to breakers.
- M/V Zamboanga City (1996) - she was originally built as the Emerald Amami of A" Lines of Japan. In 1989, she was sold to William Lines and was renamed to Zamboanga City. in 1996 she was transferred to WG&A but she was later sold for scrap.
- M/V Maynilad (1996–1999) - She was originally built as the Akatsuki of A” Lines of Japan. She was built by Towa Shipbuilding in the Shimonoseki shipyard. She was launched in May 1981 and was completed in July 1981. In 1992, she was acquired by William Lines to become the Maynilad she replaced the ill-fated Manila City which was destroyed by fire in a Cebu shipyard on February 16, 1991, and was subsequently broken up in 1992. In 1996 she was transferred to WG&A. later, she was transferred to Cebu Ferries and was renamed to Our Lady of Akita 2. In 2002, she was retired and sold to breakers.
- M/V Masbate Uno (1996–1998) - She was originally built in August 1971 as the Hayamoto Maru in Japan. In 1987 she was sold to William Lines and became the Masbate I In 1996 she became part of WG&A and she was later transferred to Cebu Ferries and renamed to M/V Our Lady Of Manoag. In 2005, she was sold broken up.

== Incidents and accidents ==
- On March 26, 1997, SuperFerry 7 was hit by fire while docked in Pier 4 in Manila North Harbor. There were no more passengers left as the ship had already finished discharging them. It was WG&A's first major accident.
- On February 8, 2000, SuperFerry 3 caught fire while undergoing repair in Keppel Shipyard in Cebu.
- On October 12, 2000, SuperFerry 6 caught fire on its starboard panel and sank. More than 1,000 passengers were rescued.
- On May 25, 2003, SuperFerry 12 was involved on a collision with a small passenger-cargo vessel, MV San Nicholas near Limbones Point, off Cavite province 33 nautical miles (61 kilometres) south of Manila. All 1,506 passengers and 184 crew members of the Superferry 12 were safe but unfortunately at least eight people were killed and 132 had been rescued from MV San Nicholas.
- On February 27, 2004, SuperFerry 14 was bombed by the Abu Sayyaf terrorists killing 116 people. It was considered as the worst terrorist attack in the Philippines.
- On March 9, 2006, SuperFerry 12 caught fire off the coast of Bantayan Island. None of the 664 passengers were injured.
- On September 6, 2009, SuperFerry 9 reported engine trouble while on its way to the port of Iloilo from General Santos. The ship then listed to a 30–40 degree angle, and at 2am the captain of the vessel ordered to abandon ship. It later sank off the southern Zamboanga Peninsula with more than 966 people on board. 957 people have been rescued but there are also 9 fatalities.

== Trivia ==
- Before 2GO Maligaya, Masagana, and Masigla, SuperFerry 12, 15, 16, 17 and 18 were the only Philippine ships with an escalator on board.
- Parts of the film Pacquiao about the boxer of the same name were filmed on board SuperFerry 18.
- The Titanic parody Tataynic was filmed on board SuperFerry 12 and SuperFerry 1.
- SuperFerry was the official logistics partner of Pinoy Dream Academy.

== See also ==
- Negros Navigation
- Cebu Ferries
- Montenegro Lines
- SuperCat
- Roble Shipping Inc.
- Trans-Asia Shipping Lines
- List of shipping companies in the Philippines
