= MV Cebu City =

History

Philippines
- Name: MV Cebu City
- Owner: William Lines Inc.
- Operator: William Lines Inc.
- Builder: Nigata Engineering Co. Ltd. japan
- Cost: 19.5 Million Pesos
- Christened: September 22, 1972
- Completed: September 22, 1972
- Out of service: 2 December 1994
- Fate: Sank after a collision with the cargo ship MV Kota Suria

General characteristics
- Type: Cruiser
- Tonnage: 2,452 GT
- Length: 98.8 m (324 ft)
- Installed power: Hitachi B&W Dissel Engine
- Speed: 20 knots (37 km/h; 23 mph)
- Capacity: 941 passengers

MV Cebu City was a ferry operated by William Lines Incorporated (which later merged with Aboitiz Incorporated in 1996).

== Sinking ==
On December 2, 1994, the 2,452-tonne ferry sank in Manila Bay after colliding with Singaporean freighter Kota Suria, claiming 140 lives. After the investigation by the Philippine Coast Guard, the crew of Cebu City was found responsible for the incident. The collision could have been avoided if the Cebu City had obeyed a call from the freighter Kota Suria to turn to starboard. Instead, Cebu City reportedly turned to port and crossed Kota Suria's path.

== See also ==
- List of maritime disasters in the Philippines
