= Supercat Fast Ferry Corporation =

Filipino ferry company

- Type: Subsidiary
- Industry: Transport
- Founded: 1994; 32 years ago
- Headquarters: 2F Trans-Asia Bldg, Osmeña Blvd corner M. J. Cuenco Ave, Cebu City, Philippines
- Area served: Philippines
- Key people: Dennis Uy (Chairman); Chryss Alfonsus V. Damuy (President & CEO); Shane Anthony G. Arante (General Manager)
- Parent: Chelsea Logistics & Infrastructure Holdings Corp.
- Website: supercat.ph chelseatravel.ph

The SuperCat Fast Ferry Corporation, commonly known as SuperCat, is a shipping company that is owned by Chelsea Logistics & Infrastructure Holdings Corp. that operates a fleet of high-speed catamarans (HSC) in the Philippines.

SuperCat was previously the sister company of SuperFerry, Cebu Ferries and 2GO Travel.

SuperCat operates 10 vessels in 5 ports around the Philippines.

== History ==
=== Origins ===
Interior of SuperCat 32, bound for Cebu City

Batangas - Calapan route is one of the most important shipping routes in the Philippines. During the early 1990s, the route was dominated by a single large shipping company. Travelling during those days could take up to 3 hours and be uncomfortable. In 1994, Rodolfo G. Valencia, then Governor of Oriental Mindoro, invited the Aboitiz Group to ply the route. His intention was to bring a more convenient and faster alternative to Mindoro. Under the management of Universal Aboitiz Inc., M/V SuperCat 1, their pioneer vessel, traveled between Batangas and Calapan in only 45 minutes.

=== Growth ===
SuperCat added routes throughout the Visayas Region. High-speed crafts became popular in the Philippines. In 1997, Sea Angels (owned by Negros Navigation) merged with Universal Aboitiz and Hong Kong Park View Holdings to form the Philippine Fast Ferry Corporation. SuperCat also acquired the 2 vessels of Waterjet Shipping Corporation (owned by Waterjet Netherlands Antilles). They renamed it as SuperCat 17 (former Waterjet 1) and SuperCat 18 (former Waterjet 2).

=== Downsizing of & more economical fleet ===
The merger was eventually dissolved in 2002 and SuperCat became solely owned by Aboitiz. The abolition of the WG&A merger then soon unraveled. SuperCat sacrificed some of its vessels and their corresponding routes in order to sustain its fast craft operations. SuperCat also downsized from 200 to just 100 employees.

From the 1990s to early 2000s, all SuperCat vessels were waterjet-propelled. Due to economic problems, Aboitiz was forced sell ships reducing an original fleet of fourteen down to just seven.

To cope with the soaring fuel prices, SuperCat started replacing their previous fleet with more fuel-efficient vessels. All jet-powered SuperCat HSC vessels were replaced by more fuel efficient vessels using a simple propulsion system.

In commemoration of the Philippine Centennial, SuperCat repainted some of its vessels with a "Philippine Flag Livery".

The fleet changes resulted to longer trips taking at least an hour, up from 45 minutes.

SuperCat has owned three monohull fast crafts, namely SC 20, 21, and 23.

Sharon Cuneta filmed SuperCat's TV advertisement in both Batangas City and Calapan. The ad was only advertised on board and through local cable networks TV ad in Roxas, Oriental Mindoro and Iloilo City.

SuperCat used to have its own exclusive terminal and docking area in Calapan. This was built after the loss of SuperCat 1, where sabotage was suspected. The terminal was eventually demolished after a bigger and better public terminal for all shipping lines was opened for use in the second quarter of 2010. SuperCat was sued for mandating an additional terminal fee on top of the fare in Calapan, for the use of their newly-constructed exclusive terminal. It was then forced to remove the terminal fee.

=== Exit of Aboitiz ===
In 2012, after Negros Navigation acquired SuperCat's parent company, Aboitiz Transport System, all of SuperCat vessels briefly became part of 2GO Travel. The SuperCat brand was later re-established and became part 2GO Group.

=== Under Dennis Uy ===
In 2019, SuperCat was acquired by the Dennis Uy-led Udenna Group through its Chelsea Logistics & Infrastructure Holdings Corp. from the 2GO Group. Chelsea Logistics had previously acquired an indirectly ownership of 28.15% of Supercat in 2016 and took over management of SuperCat the same year. At the time Mr. Uy was chairman of the 2GO Group.

== Routes ==
As of 2024, SuperCat serves the following routes.

From	To
Batangas	Calapan
Calapan	Batangas
Cebu	Ormoc
Cebu	Larena, Siquijor
Cebu	Tagbilaran
Ormoc	Cebu
Larena, Siquijor	Cebu
Tagbilaran	Cebu
Tagbilaran	Larena, Siquijor

== Fleet ==
The SuperCat fleet is composed of 11 high-speed catamarans, but they also owned monohulled vessels.

=== Vessels ===
Name	IMO	Built	Entry of service to the Philippines	Tonnage	Length	Breadth	Notes	Image
St. Sealthiel	IMO number: 9227091	2000		180	28 m (92 ft)	8.5 m (28 ft)	St. Sealthiel used to be SuperCat 25 & M/V Mt. Samat Ferry 5, which was operated by defunct Philippine fast ferry company, Mt. Samat. She is a sister ship of Supercat 22 and was also built by FBMA Marine Inc. (an Aboitiz Company) in Balamban, Cebu. Similarly, this vessel uses a simple propulsion system and is fuel-efficient. She was renamed M/V Smart in South Korea, before ending up with SuperCat.	
St. Emmanuel	IMO number: 8745589	1998	2011	175	25 m (82 ft)		St. Emmanuel used to be SuperCat 26 and SeaCat from Australia, traveling Perth to Rottnest Island. She has twin Caterpillar C32 engines and can cruise up to 28 knots. She's 25m in length.	2GO_Travel_Catamaran_in_Iloilo
St. Uriel	IMO number: 9056210	1992		229	32 m (105 ft)	8 m (26 ft)	St. Uriel used to be Supercat 23. She uses a simple propulsion system and her engines are fuel efficient. She also offers an open deck accommodation at a more affordable price.	
St. Jhudiel	IMO number: 9135717	1996	2008	184	27.7 m (91 ft)	9.24 m (30.3 ft)	St. Jhudiel used to be SuperCat 30 and Hanseblitz, one of Elbe City Jet's catamaran From 1996 to 2001. She was reconfigured and elevated its Captain's bridge at Abeking & Rasmussen, and later on acquired by Transtejo in Lisbon, Portugal renamed Bairro Alto until early 2008. She has two decks. The upper deck offers business class accommodation. This vessel was built by Lindstol Skips, in Risør, Norway. Unlike the other SuperCat vessels, this vessel is equipped with controllable pitch propellers as its propulsion system. St. Braquiel is her sister ship.	
St. Braquiel	IMO number: 9135705	1992		293	27.94 m (91.7 ft)	9.24 m (30.3 ft)	St. Braquiel used to be SuperCat 32 and Hansepfeil, one of Elbe City Jet's catamaran. From 1996 to 2002 and was reconfigured and elevated its Captain's bridge at Abeking & Rasmussen, and later on acquired by Transtejo in Lisbon, Portugal renamed Parque das Nacoes until early 2008. She has two decks. The upper deck offers business class accommodation. This vessel was built by Lindstol Skips, in Risør, nNorway. Unlike the other Supercat vessels, this vessel is equipped with controllable pitch propellers as its propulsion system. St Jhudiel is her sister ship.	
St. Dominic	IMO number: 8911815	1990	2008	238	34.8 m (114 ft)	10 m (33 ft)	St. Dominic, formerly known as SuperCat 38 and Sir David Martin, is one of three Sydney JetCats purchased for the Manly service to replace hydrofoils. She operated from Manly to Circular Quay from 1990 until 2008 before being sold to Supercat. She uses a KAMEWA waterjet-propulsion and her maximum service speed can reach up to 31 knots. On October 26, 2020, St. Dominic capsized in Batangas port during Typhoon Rolly.	
St. Camael	IMO number: 9822920	2017		272	31 m (102 ft)	9 m (30 ft)	In June and July 2017, Austal Philippines delivered two 30-meter catamarans to SuperCat Fast Ferry Corporation, MV St. Camael and MV St. Sariel. Each of the high speed ferries can carry up to 300 passengers, and can cruise at 25 knots.	
St. Sariel	IMO number: 9822918	2017		272	31 m (102 ft)	9 m (30 ft)	In June and July 2017, Austal Philippines delivered two 30-meter catamarans to SuperCat Fast Ferry Corporation, MV St. Camael and MV St. Sariel. Each of the high speed ferries can carry up to 300 passengers, and can cruise at 25 knots.	
St. Micah	IMO number: 9005443	1990	2015	447	38 m (125 ft)	11 m (36 ft)	She was first known as M/V Silangan Express 1. later acquired by SuperCat in 2019.	
Sprint 1	IMO number: 9882695	2019	2020	249	40.6 m (133 ft)	6.2 m (20 ft)	She is the first vessel to join the Supercat fleet after Chelsea Logistics Inc. acquired Supercat in 2019. She is also the first Supercat Vessel to have an all female crew aboard.	

=== Former vessels ===
Supercat 7

- SuperCat 1 (sank-off en route to Calapan, Mindoro Oriental)
- SuperCat - I (sold to Emeraude Lines renamed as NORMANDIE EXPRESS, later renamed as Moorea Express)
- Supercat 2 (sold to Korean Shipping Company KOREA EXPRESS FERRY CO., Ltd, renamed as Korea Express)
- SuperCat 3 (sold to Croatian Shipping Company Jadrolinija, renamed as Karolina)
- SuperCat 5 (sold to Croatian Shipping Company Jadrolinija, renamed as Judita)
- SuperCat 6 (sold to Moreton Bay Whale Watching, sold to Seo Kyung Korea renamed as Gold Coast)
- SuperCat 7 (sold to Croatian Shipping Company Jadrolinija, renamed as Novalja)
- SuperCat 8 (sold to Croatian Shipping Company Jadrolinija, renamed as Dubravka)
- SuperCat 9 (sold to Croatian Shipping Company, renamed as Bisovo)
- SuperCat 10 (sold to Korean Shipping Company WONDERFUL ISLAND CO., renamed as Mosulpo 1 (모슬포1호))
- SuperCat 11/St. Raphael (sold to Italian Shipping Company Ustica Lines, renamed as Federica M)
- SuperCat 12/St. Gabriel (sold to Italian Shipping Company Ustica Lines, renamed as Gabrielle M)
- SuperCat 17 (sold to Wightlink for use between Portsmouth and Ryde, Renamed as FastCat Ryde. Sold to Alien Shipping, renamed as Sochi-1)
- SuperCat 18 (sold to Wightlink for use between Portsmouth and Ryde, Renamed as FastCat Shanklin. Sold to Alien Shipping, renamed as Sochi-2)
- SuperCat 20 (sold to South African Shipping Company FakoShip, renamed as Endurance)
- SuperCat 21 (returned to her lessor Endurance)
- St. Nuriel (Capsized during the onslaught of Typhoon Rolly in Batangas.)
- SuperCat 2001/Tricat 50 (sold, renamed as SEA POWER 1)
- SuperCat 2002 (sold to a Dutch Shipping Company, renamed as Tiger)
- Supercat 36 (St. Benedict) (Sold to undisclosed buyer on August 19, 2021 for PHP 2.5 million.)

== Incidents ==
In September 1994, M/V SuperCat 1 sank near Verde Island. There were no casualties. All passengers were rescued by another RORO vessel.

On October 26, 2020, St. Nuriel capsized in Batangas port during Typhoon Rolly.||

In May 21, 2023, MV St. Jhudiel, collided with LCT Poseidon 23 in Mactan Channel. There were no casualties.

== See also ==
- Montenegro Lines
- Starlite Ferries
- Oceanjet
- Roble Shipping Inc.
- List of shipping companies in the Philippines
