= List of shipping companies in the Philippines =

This is a list of current and former shipping companies authorized by the Maritime Industry Authority of the Philippines.

== Passenger and cargo ==
Shipping Lines	Image	Logo	Commenced Operations	No. of Vessels	Remarks
2GO Group			1949	10	
Aleson Shipping Lines			1976	37	
Archipelago Philippine Ferries Corporation (FastCat)			2002	18	
Asian Marine Transport Corporation			1999	9	Operates shipping brands Super Shuttle RORO, Super Shuttle Ferry and Shuttle Fast Ferries.
Cokaliong Shipping Lines, Inc.			1989	16	
Ever Shipping Lines			1975	3	
Jomalia Shipping Corporation			2004	10	
Camotes Ferry Services			2006	6	
Lite Shipping Corporation (Lite Ferries)			1989	27	
Montenegro Shipping Lines			1978	90	
AFGM Shipping Corp.			2001	23	
Ocean Fast Ferries, Inc. (OceanJet)			1995	23	
Roble Shipping Inc.			1985	21	
SuperCat Fast Ferry Corporation			1994	10	Acquired by Chelsea Logistics Holdings Inc. in 2019.
SRN Fast Seacrafts, Inc. (Weesam Express)			1997	6	
Starhorse Shipping Lines			2008	17	
Starlite Ferries Inc.			1995	20	Acquired by Chelsea Logistics Holdings Inc.
Trans-Asia Shipping Lines (TASLI)			1974	13	Acquired by Chelsea Logistics Holdings Inc.
Evaristo Shipping Lines			2012	4	
Evaristo and Sons Sea Transport Corp.			2017	5	
Kho Shipping Lines (KSLI)			2021	18	

== Cargo ==
Shipping Lines	Image	Logo	Commenced Operations	No. of Vessels	Remarks
Philippine Span Asia Carrier Corporation			1973	17	Formerly Sulpicio Lines from 1973 to 2012; changed name and stopped passenger services following the tragic sinking of its passenger ship MV Princess of the Stars in 2008.
Carlos A. Gothong Lines (CAGLI)			1946	1	
Gothong Southern Shipping Lines			2005	12	
MCC Transport Philippines			2007	3	Joint venture between Danish shipping company Maersk Line and 2GO Group.
Moreta Shipping Lines			1988	12	
Lorenzo Shipping Corporation			1972	5 (company owned) 4 (chartered from NMC Container Lines)	Owned by Magsaysay Shipping & Logistics.
NMC Container Lines			1997	4 (leased by Lorenzo Shipping)	Owned by Magsaysay Shipping & Logistics.
Meridian Shipping and Container Carrier Inc				9	
Oceanic Container Lines, Inc.			1998	21	
Phil National Lines			2008	28	
Fastguys Logistic Corporation			2012	5	
Cargomarine Corporation			2012	10	Acquired by Phil National Lines in 2012

== Defunct ==
Shipping companies that are no longer in operation.

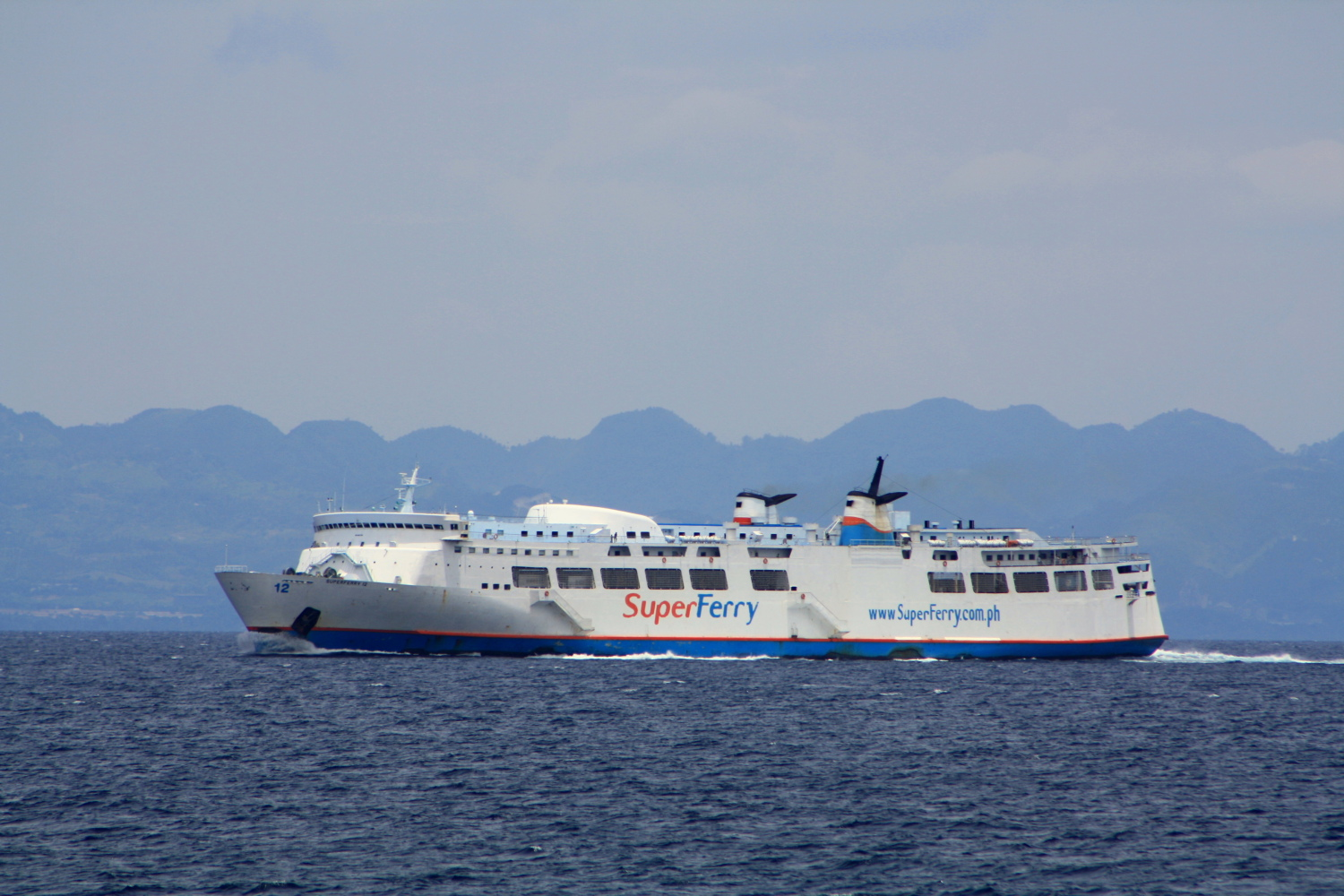
MV SuperFerry 12 of Aboitiz Transport System

Shipping Lines	Commenced Operations	Ceased Operations	Remarks
Aboitiz Shipping Corporation (ASC)	1952	1996	Merged with Gothong Lines and William Lines to form WG&A.
SuperFerry	1990	2012	Brand operated by Aboitiz and WG&A, discontinued in 2012 and replaced by 2GO Travel.
Cebu Ferries	1996	2012	Became part of 2GO Travel in 2012.
Negros Navigation	1935	2018	Merged with 2GO Group in 2018.
Sweet Lines Inc.	1961	1993	
Compania Maritima	1890	1980	
Escaño Lines	1865	1990s	
MBRS Lines	1984	2008	
Romblon Shipping Lines	2008	2012	
FJP Lines	1970s	2012	

== See also ==
- Transportation in the Philippines
