= Cokaliong Shipping Lines =

Filipino shipping company operating in Visayas and Mindanao

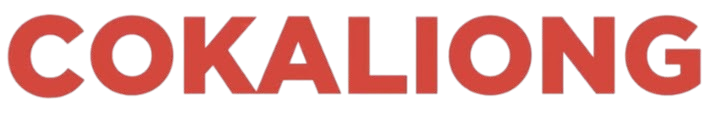
- Current logo

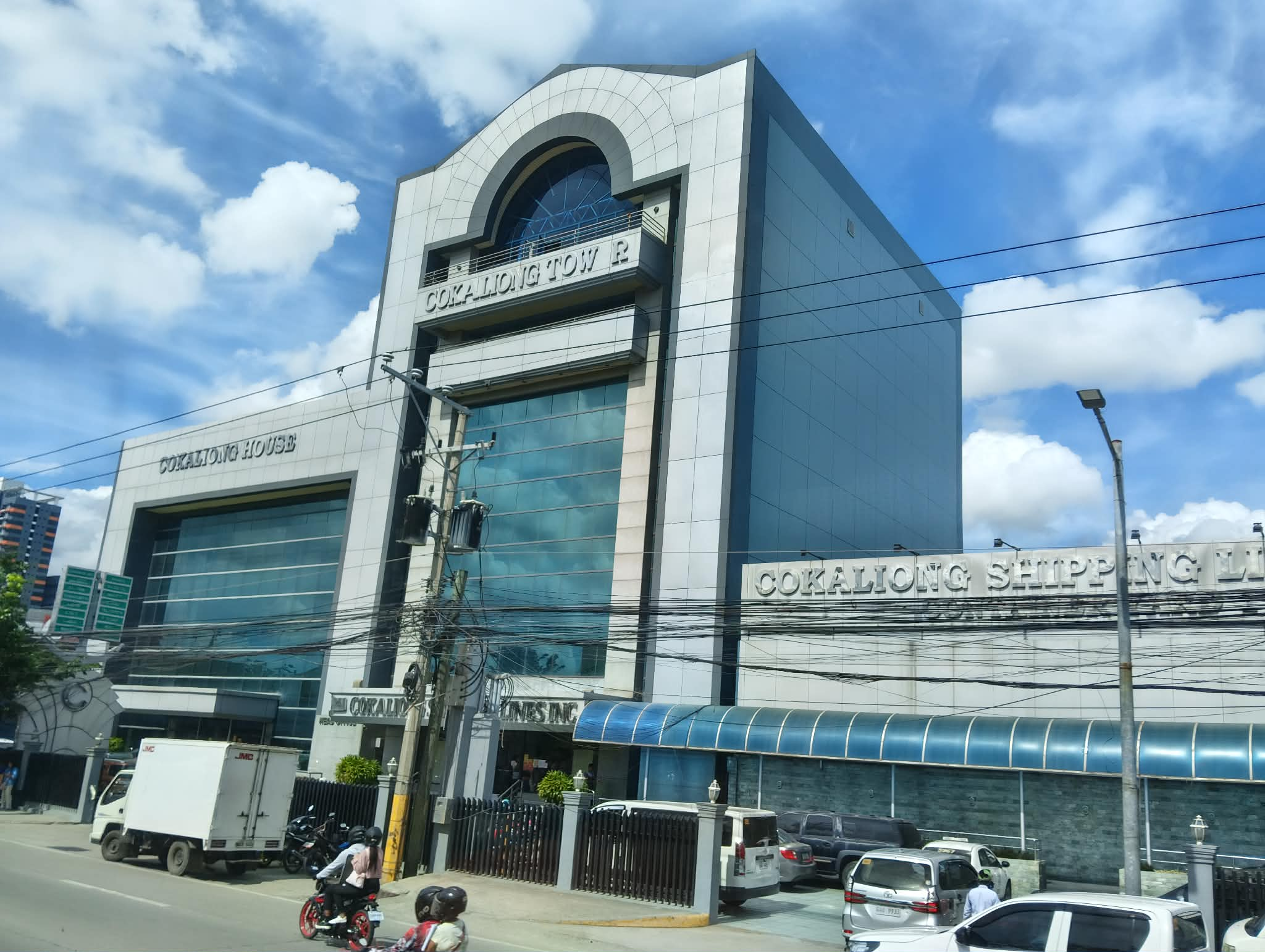
- Current headquarters in Osmeña Blvd., Cebu City
- Type: Private company
- Industry: Shipping
- Founded: December 8, 1989; 36 years ago
- Headquarters: Cokaliong Tower, Osmeña Blvd. North Reclamation Area, Cebu City, Philippines
- Area served: Philippines
- Key people: Chester C. Cokaliong; Founder, CEO, & COO; Gregoria C. Cokaliong; President & Chairperson; Chase Cokaliong, EVP for Operations
- Divisions: Cokaliong Forwarding Division
- Website: www.cokaliongshipping.com
- Footnotes House flag

Cokaliong Shipping Lines, Inc. (CSLI) is a shipping line based in Cebu City, Philippines. It operates both passenger and cargo ferries on routes in the Visayas and Mindanao regions.

CSLI was organized in 1989 by Chester Enterprises, Inc., a textile and ready-to-wear enterprise started in 1969 that diversified into the shipping business with the purchase a vessel from Japan in 1998, christened the M/V Filipinas Ozamis. Through the years, the company has acquired many RORO passenger and cargo vessels traveling the national waters.

== Vessels ==
=== Current vessels ===
Cokaliong Shipping Lines vessels

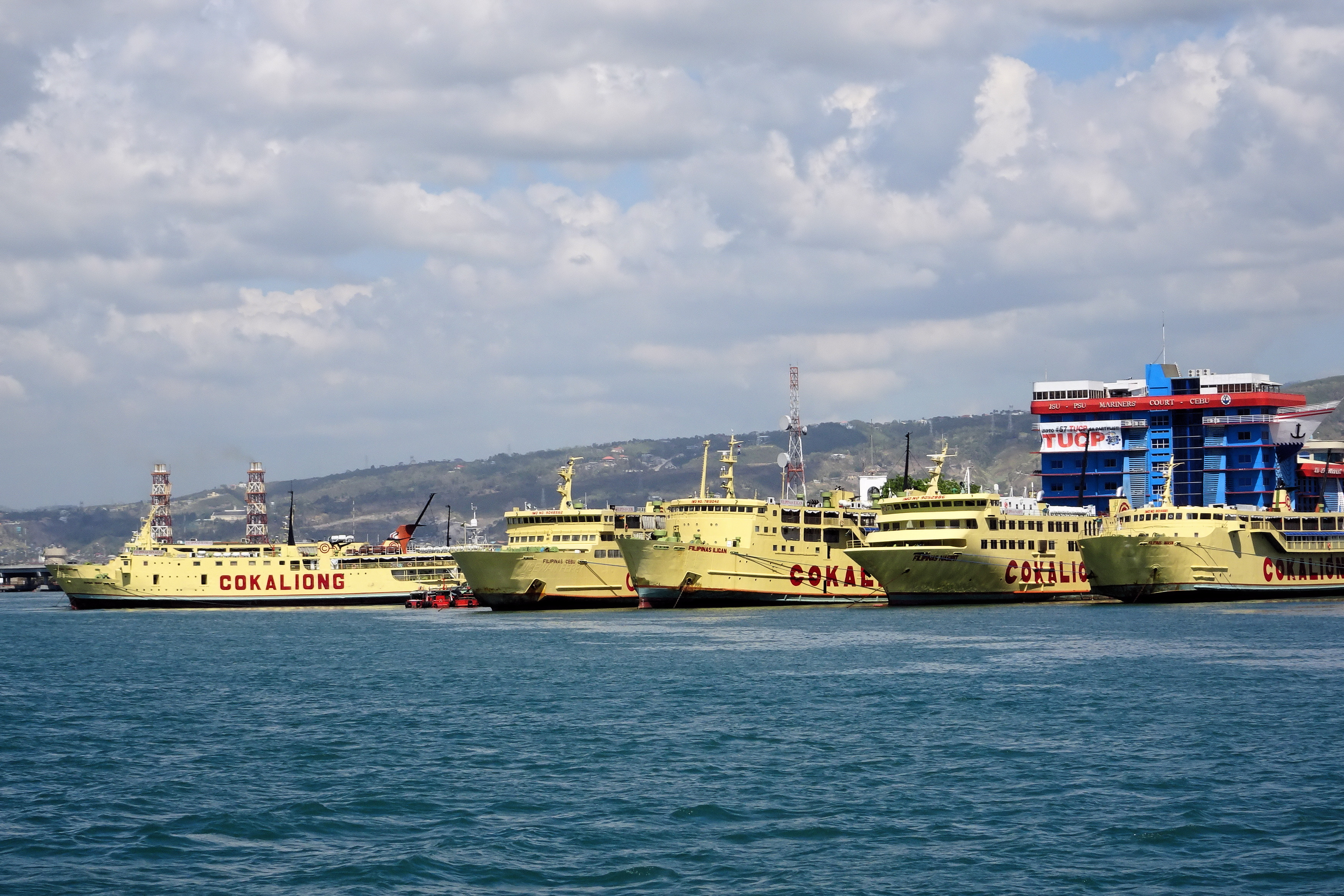
Port of Cebu with Cokaliong ships; from left to right: Filipinas Dinagat, Filipinas Cebu, Filipinas Iligan, Filipinas Nasipit, and Filipinas Maasin.

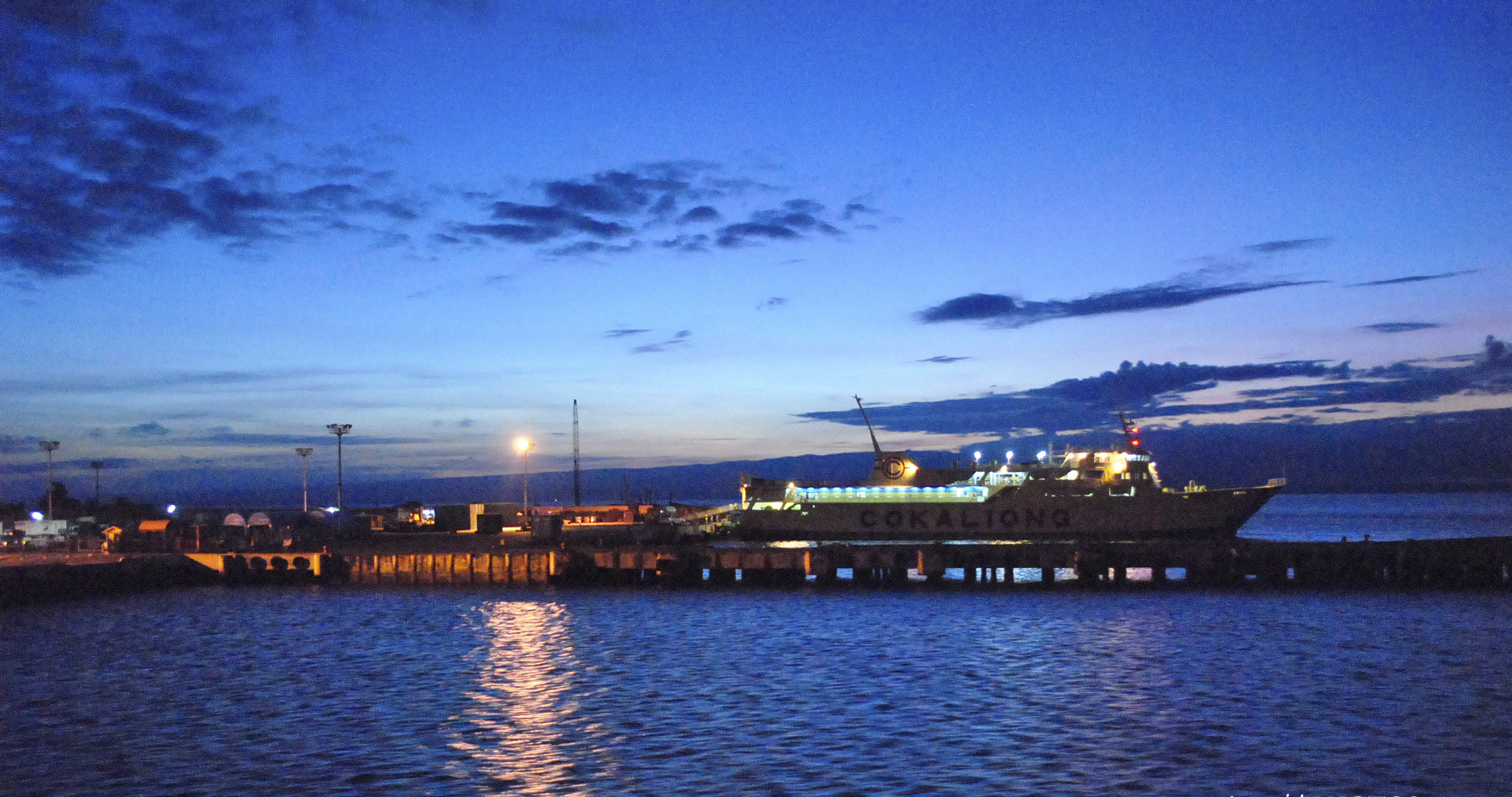
Cokaliong RORO Ship at Port of Ozamiz, Philippines.

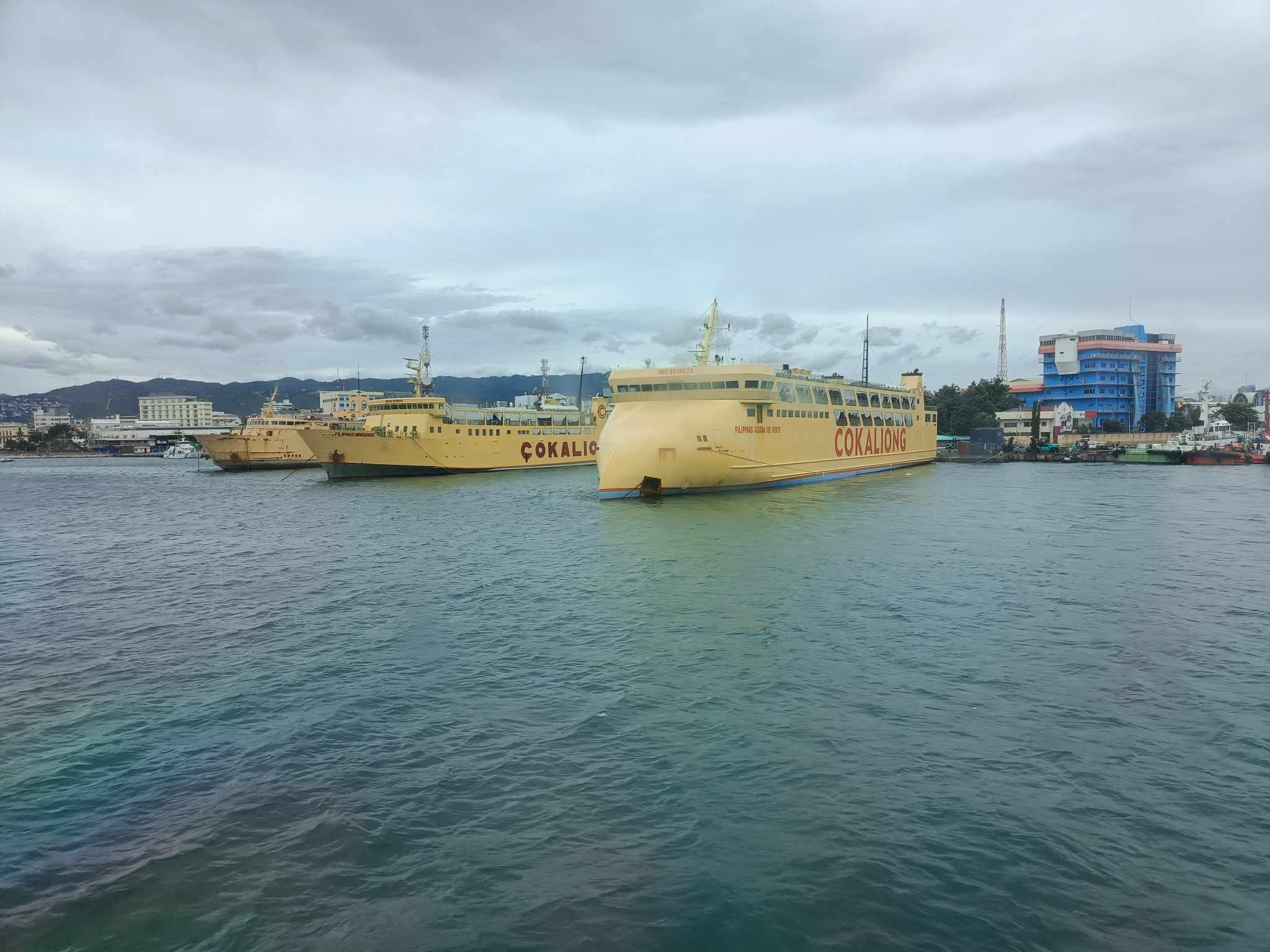
From right to left: Filipinas Agusan Del Norte, Filipinas Mindanao, and Filipinas Iloilo

Current Vessels (15 ships)
Name	IMO	Type	Launched	Maiden Voyage in the Philippines	Tonnage	Length	Breadth	Notes	Image
Ferries
M/V Filipinas Cebu	IMO number: 9048562	Ferry	1993		2727	77.37 m (253.8 ft)	14.00 m (45.93 ft)	She was built in 1993 by Naikai Zosen in Setoda, Japan. CSLI acquired her in 2007 from Ise Bay Ferry or Isewan (Ise-wan) Ferry in Japan, where she was known as the Mikawa Maru. She is the first ship with a computerized engine monitoring system of Cokaliong Shipping. She is able to carry up to 686 passengers.	
M/V Filipinas Dapitan	IMO number: 7534555	Ferry	1971		1056	60.99 m (200.1 ft)	12.81 m (42.0 ft)		
M/V Filipinas Maasin	IMO number: 8014887	Ferry	1980		2261	77.13 m (253.1 ft)	14.80 m (48.6 ft)	This vessel is under renovation in Trigon Shipyard After the Typhoon Odette.	
M/V Filipinas Ozamis	IMO number: 9185566	Ferry	1998		1560	86.90 m (285.1 ft)	14.00 m (45.93 ft)		
M/V Filipinas Iligan	IMO number: 7813042	Ferry	1978	2011	3084	79.66 m (261.4 ft)	14.30 m (46.9 ft)	She was built in 1978. She was the former Ferry Fukue that was acquired by Cokaliong Shipping Lines from Kyushu Kaiun in 2011. She has a passenger capacity of 850 pax.	
M/V Filipinas Butuan	IMO number: 8125909	Ferry	1982	2012	3086	79.66 m (261.4 ft)	14.30 m (46.9 ft)	She was built in 1982. She was the former Ferry Nagasaki that was acquired by Cokaliong Shipping Lines from Kyushu Kaiun in 2012. She has a passenger capacity of 850 pax.	
M/V Filipinas Nasipit	IMO number: 9052886	Ferry	1992	2014	1499	86.95 m (285.3 ft)	13.80 m (45.3 ft)	She was built in 1992. She was the former M/V Taiko that was acquired by Cokaliong Shipping Lines from Nomo Shosen Company Ltd in 2014. She has a passenger capacity of 685 pax	
M/V Filipinas Jagna	IMO number: 9162722	Ferry	1997	2016	2997	76.66 m (251.5 ft)	14.50 m (47.6 ft)	Built in 1997, she is the former M/V Eins Soya in Japan, before being purchased by CSLI from Japan in 2016. She can accommodate as much as 625 passengers as well as cargo.	
M/V Filipinas Surigao del Norte	IMO number: 9196412	Ferry	1999	2016	3011	76.66 m (251.5 ft)	14.50 m (47.6 ft)	She is the former M/V Avrora Okushiri, the newest acquisition of Cokaliong Shipping, purchased in 2016 and. She was built in 1999, and is the sister ship of the M/V Filipinas Jagna. She is the third vessel to have the third ship in the Cokaliong fleet to have a computerized engine monitoring system. She plies the Cebu-Surigao route.	
M/V Filipinas Cagayan de Oro	IMO number: 9211743	Roll-On Lift-off Ferry	2000	2019	3122	85.76 m (281.4 ft)	14.60 m (47.9 ft)	Built in 2000, she is the former M/V Ferry Toshima in Japan. It serves Cebu-Cagayan de Oro and Cagayan de Oro-Jagna (Bohol) route.	
M/V Filipinas Mindanao	IMO number: 9238143	Ferry	2001	2020	3810	95.70 m (314.0 ft)	15.00 m (49.21 ft)	She is the former M/V Feelease Soya of Heart Land Ferry, the newest acquisition of Cokaliong Shipping, purchased in 2019.	
M/V Filipinas Agusan Del Norte	IMO number: 9938975	Ferry	2021		6555	99.37 m (326.0 ft)	18.00 m (59.06 ft)	A brand new Ropax ferry featuring the first X-Bow/reverse bow on a passenger ferry	
M/V Filipinas Ubay	IMO number: 8986470	Ferry	2003	2022	979	65.00 m (213.25 ft)	16.00 m (52.49 ft)	Built in 2003, she is the former Seto II of Shikoku Kisen Co. Ltd. of Japan.	
M/V Filipinas Bohol	IMO number: 1112707	Ferry	2025		2283	72 m (236 ft)	15 m (49 ft)	The ship was launched on March 16, 2025 in Linhai Huipu Shipbuilding in Taizhou, Zhejiang, China, the same shipyard that built Cokaliong's M/V Filipinas Agusan del Norte. The design of this vessel is similar to the Wira series in Indonesia. She had her maiden voyage on October 15, 2025.	
Tugboats
M/Tug Cokaliong Tug 1	IMO number: 7913012	Tugboat	1979		192	31.50 m (103.3 ft)	8.80 m (28.9 ft)	Built in 1979 (44 years old) and currently sailing under the flag of Philippines.	
M/Tug Cokaliong Tug 2	IMO number: 8619170	Tugboat	1987		392	34.02 m (111.6 ft)	9.45 m (31.0 ft)	Built in 1987 (36 years old) and currently sailing under the flag of Philippines.	
M/Tug Cokaliong Tug 3	IMO number: 9180451	Tugboat	1997	2026	228	41.08 m (134.8 ft)	9 m (30 ft)	Built in 1997 by Kanbara Shipbuilding in Onomichi, Japan, the vessel was originally named Wakata Maru and operated by Naikai Tug Boat Services Co., Ltd. In 2026, the vessel was acquired by Cokaliong and renamed M/T Cokaliong Tug 3. The vessel is larger than the company’s other tugboats and is intended to support and assist its fleet operations.	

=== Upcoming Vessels ===
Name	IMO	Type	Launched	Maiden Voyage in the Philippines	Tonnage	Length	Breadth	Notes
M/V Filipinas Visayas	IMO number: 1205255	Ferry	2027		TBA	110 m (360 ft)	TBA	She will be built in China and to be launched in 2027.
M/V Filipinas Talibon	TBA	Ferry	2029 or 2030		TBA	TBA	TBA	The fourth brand-new vessel of the company is to be built in China and is scheduled for launch in 2029 or 2030.

=== Former Vessels ===
- M/V Filipinas Dumaguete (Retired in 2020 and was laid up at Ouano Wharf in Cebu City, confirmed sold to Roble Shipping)
- M/V Filipinas Iloilo (IMO number: 7913830) - Currently docked in Pier 4, rusting.
- M/V Filipinas Surigao (sold to Roble Shipping Inc. and was renamed M/V Sacred Stars).
- M/V Filipinas Siargao - formerly the M/V Gingoog City, originally a fishing vessel converted into a passenger ferry. Purchased from Mr. Co To on March 11, 1991. She was the third vessel bought domestically by Cokaliong. After 5 months of refurbishing/ renovation, she became operational on August 1991. On July 5, 1997, Cokaliong decided to retire her and sold the ship to Ting Guan Trading Corp. as scrap, to finally dispose of the last conventional vessel in its fleet and upgrade it to a full Roro fleet.
- M/V Filipinas Tandag - the company's first ship acquired from Trans-Asia Shipping Lines where she was formerly known as the M/V Asia Philippines. She had a collision with Our Lady of Lourdes, one of Gothong Lines' ships.
- M/V Filipinas Dinagat (IMO number: 7227487) - Destroyed by fire while en route from Cebu City to Palompon, Leyte with no casualties on July 23, 2020. The vessel is former Soya Maru No. 2 of Higashi Nihon Ferry of Japan and was acquired by Cokaliong in 1994.

== Ports ==
Map of ports of call served by Cokaliong. Blue: Cebu City Red: Ports of Call

Cokaliong Shipping Lines' main port of call is Cebu City. Other ports of call are:

Region	Province	City/Town	Port	Status
Luzon	Masbate	Masbate City	Port of Masbate	
Visayas	Cebu	Cebu City	Pier 5 Reclamation Area	Hub
Visayas	Samar	Calbayog	Port of Calbayog	
Visayas	Negros Oriental	Dumaguete	Port of Dumaguete	
Visayas	Iloilo	Iloilo City	Fort San Pedro	
Visayas	Bohol	Ubay	Port of Ubay	
Visayas	Bohol	Jagna	Port of Jagna	
Visayas	Bohol	Talibon	Port of Talibon	
Visayas	Leyte	Maasin	Port of Maasin	
Visayas	Leyte	Palompon	Port of Palompon	
Mindanao	Agusan del Norte	Nasipit	Port of Nasipit	
Mindanao	Misamis Oriental	Cagayan de Oro	Port of Cagayan de Oro	
Mindanao	Zamboanga del Norte	Dapitan	Port of Dapitan	
Mindanao	Lanao del Norte	Iligan	Port of Iligan	
Mindanao	Misamis Occidental	Ozamiz	Port of Ozamiz	
Mindanao	Surigao	Surigao City	Port of Surigao	

== Routes ==
As of June 2026:

- Cebu–Cagayan de Oro v.v.
- Cebu–Calbayog v.v.
- Cebu–Dapitan v.v.
- Cebu–Dumaguete v.v.
- Cebu–Iligan (via Ozamiz)
- Cebu–Iloilo v.v.
- Cebu–Jagna
- Cebu–Maasin v.v.
- Cebu–Masbate v.v.
- Cebu–Nasipit v.v.
- Cebu–Ozamiz v.v.
- Cebu–Palompon v.v.
- Cebu–Surigao v.v.
- Cebu–Ubay v.v.
- Cebu–Talibon v.v.
- Cagayan de Oro–Jagna v.v.
- Dapitan–Dumaguete v.v.
- Iligan–Ozamiz v.v.
- Jagna–Nasipit v.v.

== Incidents and accidents ==
- On November 15, 2011, M/V Filipinas Dapitan ran aground at the Port of Surigao City. 363 passengers was rescued and no injuries.
- On around November to Early December 2012, M/V Filipinas Iligan ran aground around somewhere in Southern Misamis Occidental at 1am.
- On July 23, 2020, M/V Filipinas Dinagat caught fire off the coast of Northern Cebu en route to Palompon. As reported, there were no passengers aboard and all 47 crew members were rescued. The fire was placed under control around 10am the next day.
- M/V Filipinas Cebu ran aground at 12:08am on August 9, 2022 in Iloilo. The captain was reportedly asleep. All crew members and passengers were safe.
- On April 21, 2023, M/V Filipinas Cebu ran aground in waters off of the Ozamiz Port at around 6pm.
- M/V Filipinas Butuan ran aground in the vicinity of Madridejos, Cebu on October 23 2023 before arriving to Iloilo City. The cause of the vessel to ran aground was by drifting to shallow waters. The vessel recently left the port of Cebu, at around 7PM. All 239 passengers safely disembarked and were transported to Kota Park, Madridejos, Cebu.
- M/V Filipinas Cagayan de Oro recently tilted one side around 11:40pm on November 12 2023. after the departure, all crew and passengers were safe.
- In October 9, 2023, M/V Filipinas Surigao Del Norte suffered a liquid chlorine leak, which produced Ammonia. The crew reportedly had trouble breathing inside.
- On the evening of August 24, 2025, M/V Filipinas Surigao Del Norte ran aground off Dimasalang, Masbate. The vessel was enroute to Cebu City from Masbate City. The vessel later managed to depart from the area and continued its voyage at a speed of 9-10 knots, following the owner's instruction. However, the Philippine Coast Guard Masbate Station has directed the vessel to return to Masbate Port. The ship ultimately arrived safely at the Port of Cebu.
- On November 17, 2025, at around 8:21 PM, MV Star Zamboanga reportedly lost steering control and collided with the outbound MV Filipinas Dapitan near the Ouano Wharf–Opon Wharf area in Cebu City; both vessels sustained minor damage and were confirmed safe, returning to the Cebu Pier 1 area by 9:15 PM.

== See also ==
- List of shipping companies in the Philippines
- 2GO Travel
- Weesam Express
- Ever Shipping Lines Inc.
- Aleson Shipping Lines
- Montenegro Shipping Lines
