= Gothong Southern =

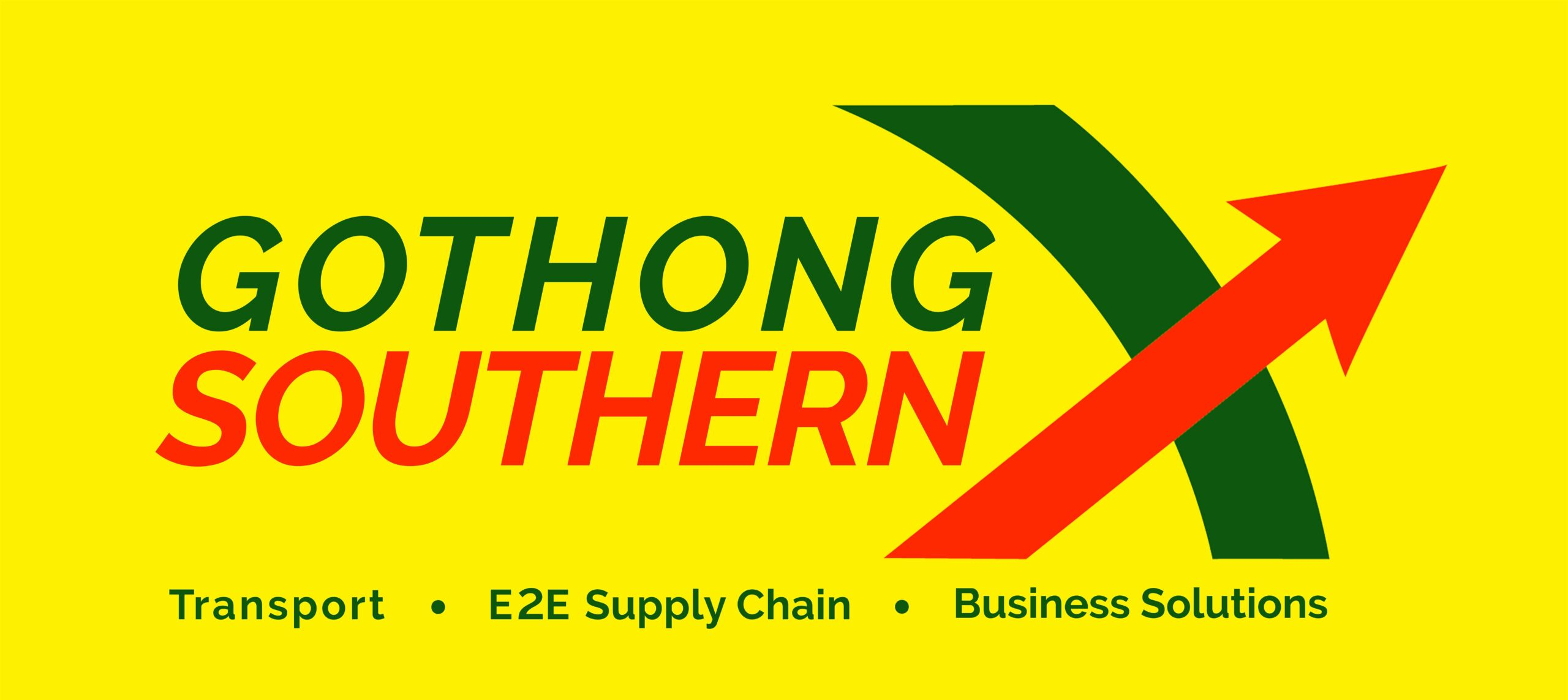
- Company type: Subsidiary
- Industry: Shipping
- Founded: 2005
- Founder: Bob "Roberto" Gothong
- Headquarters: North Reclamation Area, Cebu City, Philippines
- Area served: Philippines
- Key people: Roberto D. Gothong (CEO); Charles Robert Gothong (President)
- Services: Logistics, Freight
- Parent: One Wilson Place Holdings, Inc.
- Website: gothong.com

Gothong Southern, formally Gothong Southern Shipping Lines Incorporated, is a shipping and cargo line based in Cebu City. The company was established by Bob Gothong in 2003 and is different from the original Carlos A. Gothong Lines, Inc. Gothong Southern provides containerized shipping in the Philippines, as well as specialized services for container and chassis repairs, integrated port services and shipping line activities.

== Vessels ==
=== Current fleet ===
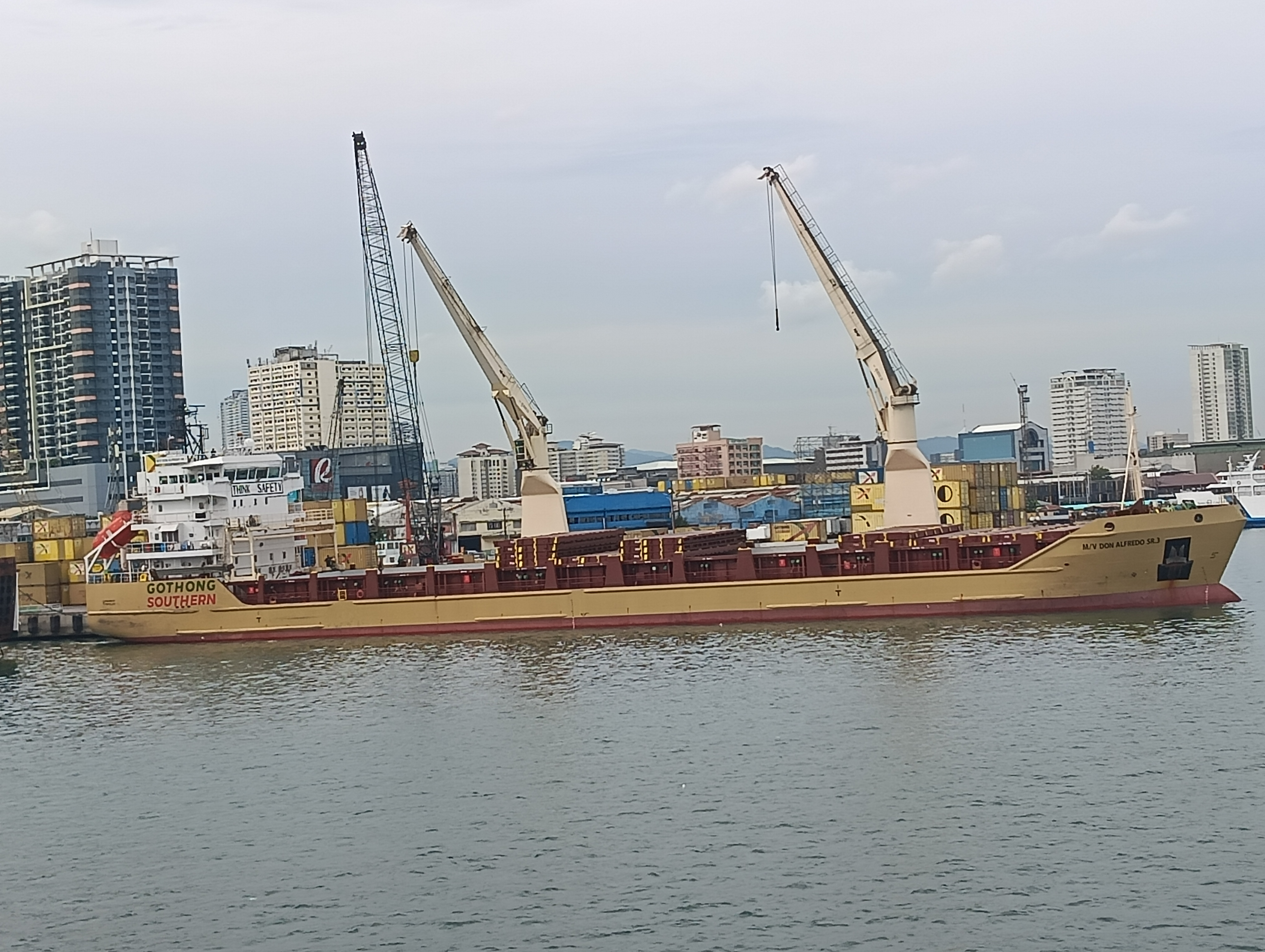
MV Don Alfredo Sr. 3

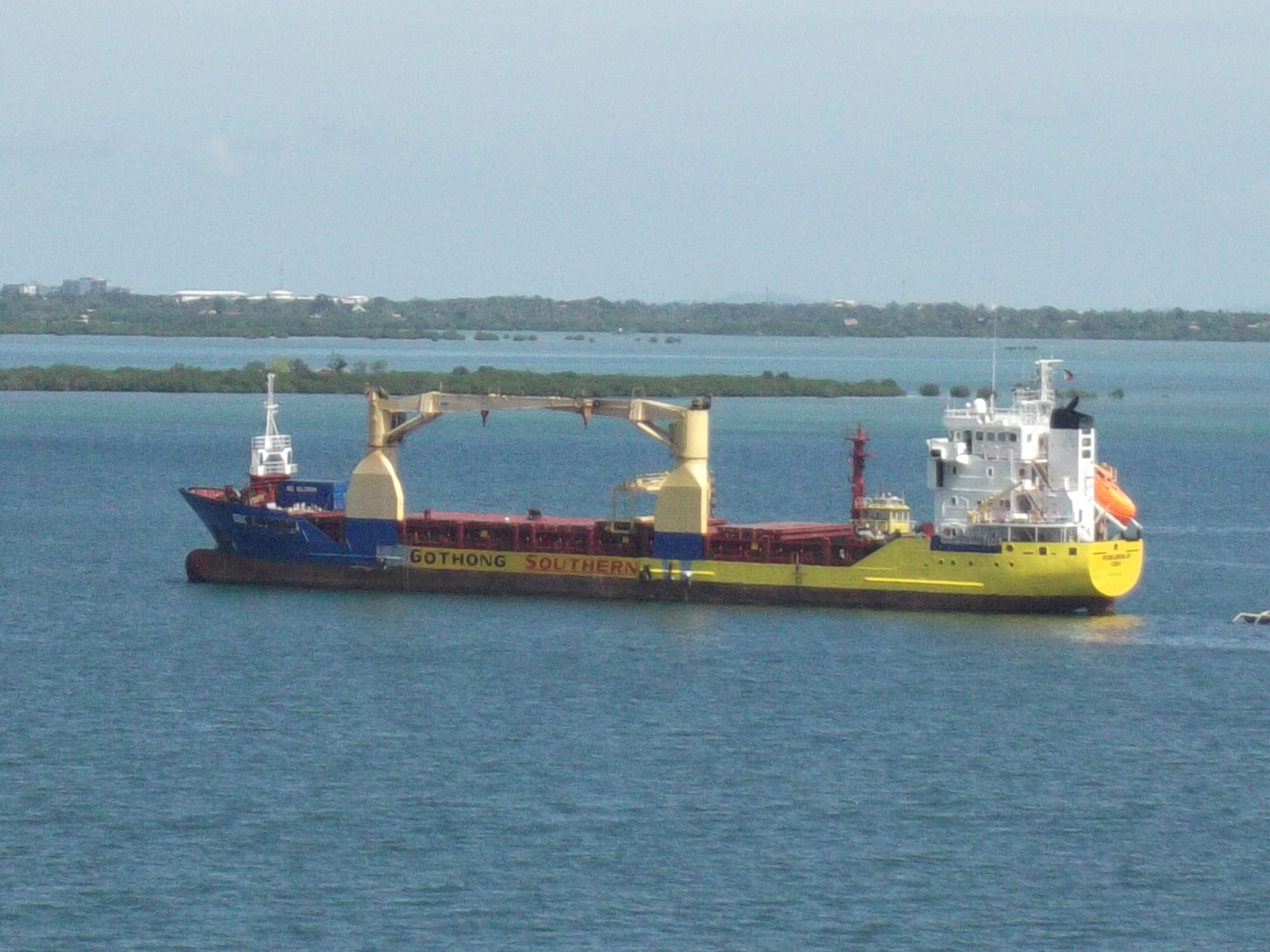
MV Doña Caroline Joy

Gothong Southern Shipping currently has 12 Cargo Vessels:

- Don Alfonso Sr. 2
- Don Alfredo Sr. 3
- Don Albino Sr.
- Don Carlos Sr. 2
- Doña Caroline Joy
- Don Charles Robert
- Don Cerferino Alfredo
- Don Daniel
- Don Alan Sr.
- Don Alan Sr. 2
- Doña Dariana Brielle
- Doña Danessa Isobel

=== Former Fleet ===
Passenger

- Doña Conchita Sr.
- Doña Rita Sr.

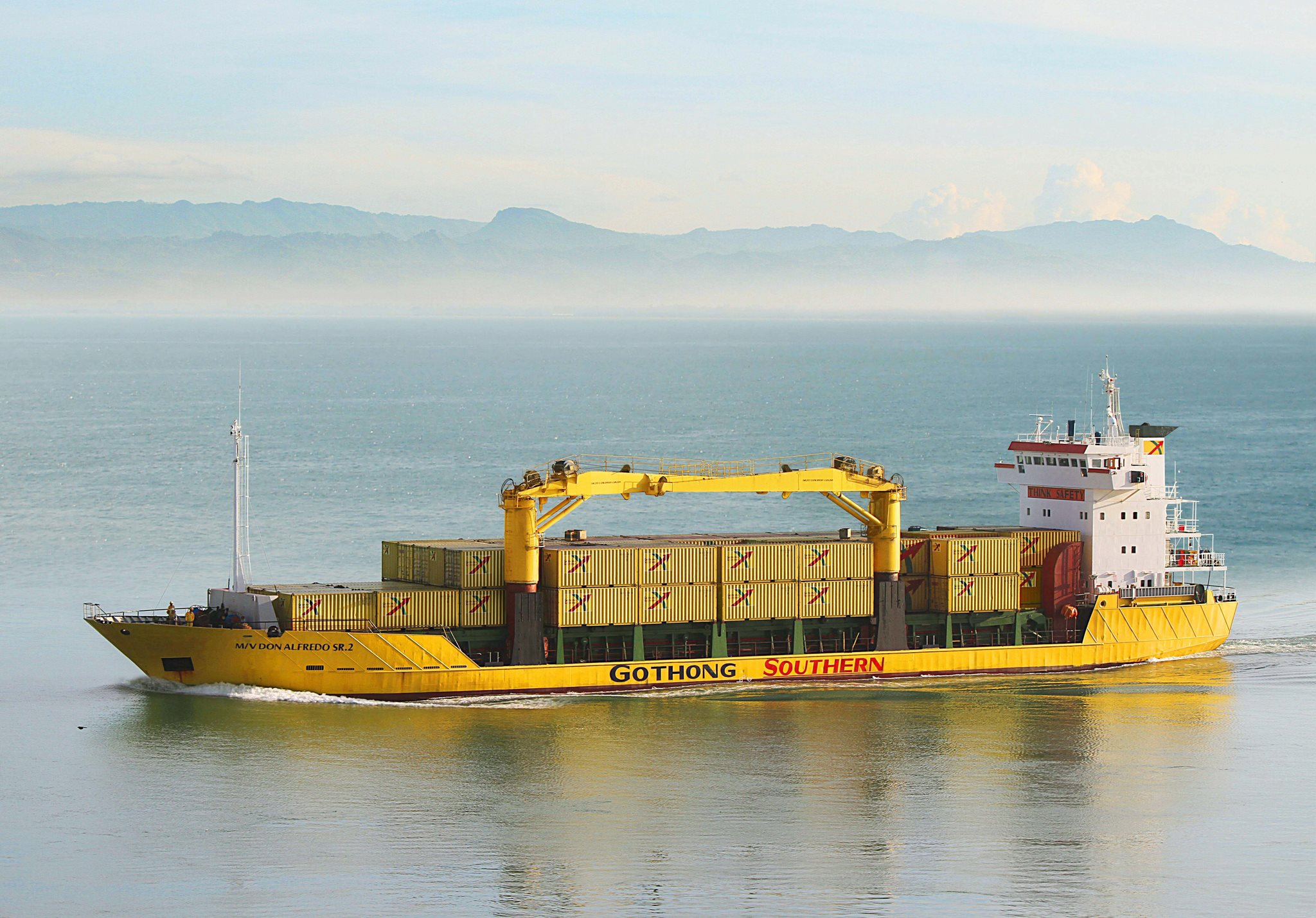
MV Don Alfredo Sr. 2

Cargo

- Don Daxton
- Don Carlos Sr. 1
- Don Alfredo Sr.
- Don Alfredo Sr. 2
- Don Alberto Sr.
- Don Alfonso Sr.
- Don Carlos Sr.

== Ports of Call ==
Gothong Southern currently has 11 ports of call as of August 2025:

- Bacolod
- Cagayan De Oro
- Cebu City
- Davao City
- General Santos
- Iligan
- Iloilo City
- Manila
- Ozamiz
- Tacloban
- Tagbilaran

== See also ==
- Gothong Lines
- Trans-Asia Shipping Lines
- Cebu Ferries
- Montenegro Lines
- Roble Shipping Inc.
- List of shipping companies in the Philippines
