= Trans-Asia Shipping Lines =

Shipping company in the Philippines

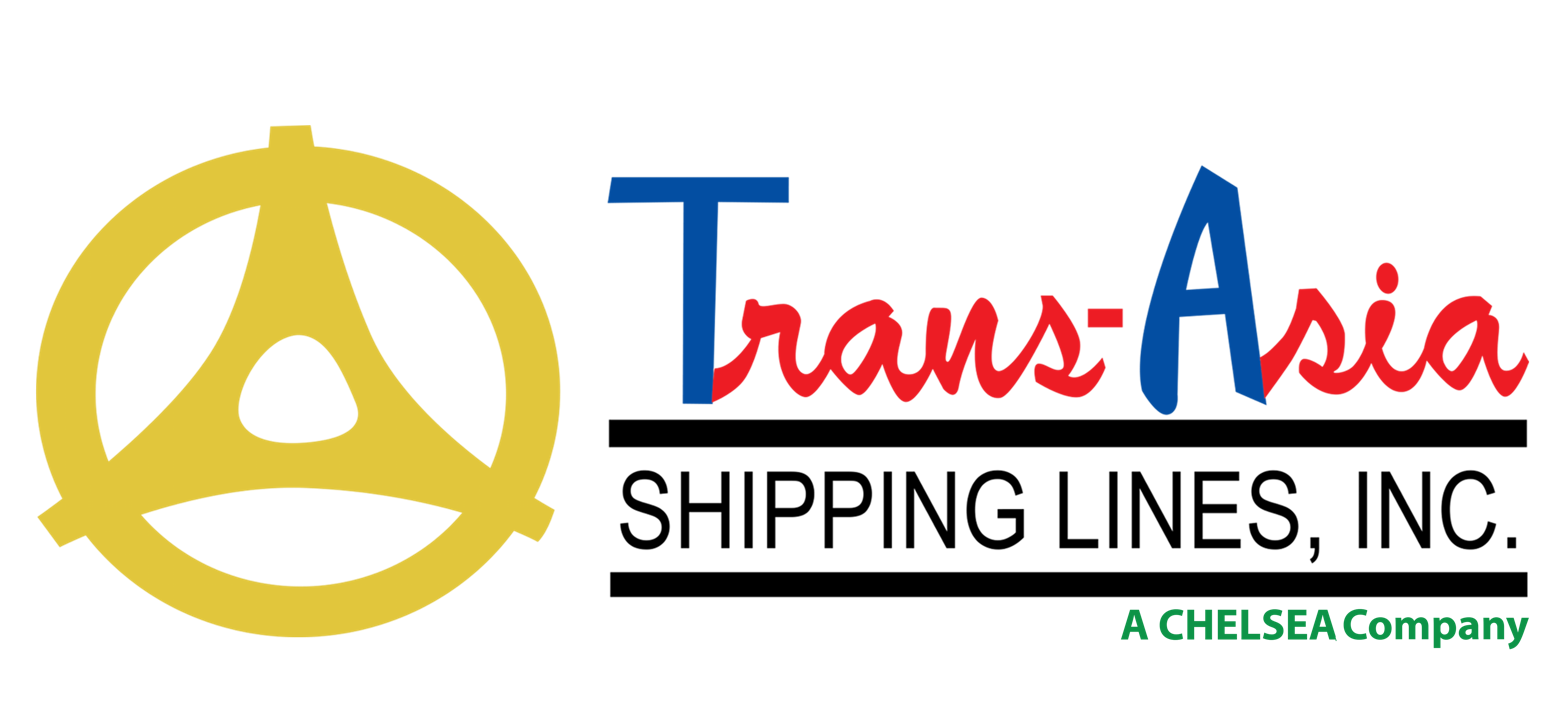
- Trans-Asia Shipping's Logo
- Type: Private
- Industry: Transportation
- Founded: March 25, 1974; 52 years ago
- Founder: Julian G. Sy Sr.
- Headquarters: Corner MJ Cuenco Avenue, & Osmeña Boulevard, Cebu City, Philippines
- Area served: Philippines
- Key people: Dennis A. Uy; Chairman; Arthur Kenneth L. Sy; President and CEO; Sheila Fay U. Sy; General Manager
- Services: Passenger and cargo transportation
- Parent: Chelsea Logistics Holdings Corporation
- Subsidiaries: Quality Metal & Shipworks; Oceanstar Shipping; Dynamic Cuisine; Starsy Shoppe
- Website: transasiashipping.com chelseatravel.ph

Trans-Asia Shipping Lines, Incorporated (TASLI) is a shipping company based in Cebu City, Philippines. It was incorporated on March 25, 1974, under the name of Solar Shipping Lines, Inc. The Chairman of the company is Dennis A. Uy. Trans-Asia Shipping Lines is now managed by the Chelsea Logistics, Corp.

The company took steps towards cargo modernization in 2013, by acquiring almost 8,000 square meters of property within Cebu Pier area, and upgrading operations to include 10-footer container vans while maintaining loose and palletized / break bulk operations to cater to clients' varying needs. By 2015, the company started offering 20-foot container van service for Cebu to Cagayan and Cagayan to Cebu route.

In 2016, the company expanded cargo operations to Manila, with a freighter vessel offering Less Container Cargo (LCL) and Full Container Load (FCL) cargo service. Barely 6 months of serving Cebu to Manila and Manila to Cebu route, we now include 40-footer container service.

In December 2016, Chelsea Logistics Holdings Corporation purchased the entire outstanding shares of stocks of Trans-Asia Shipping Lines, Inc. including its four subsidiaries.

== Current fleet ==
TASLI operates 6 passenger-cargo vessels (one out of service) and 5 cargo vessels.

Passenger vessels (6 Ships)
Name	IMO	Type	Launched	Maiden Voyage in the Philippines	Tonnage	Length	Breadth	Notes	Image
M/V Trans-Asia 1 (3rd Gen Passenger vessel)	IMO number: 7902726	Ferry	1980	2019	11457	126.96 m (416.5 ft)	21.00 m (68.90 ft)	M/V Trans-Asia 1 was formerly known as Warrior Spirit until she was acquired by the company in late 2016. She was built by Ateliers et Chantiers du Havre in their Le Havre yard in France. She was completed in 1980. She was also the secondary subject of the infamous "Tayog-Tayog" ghost ship, along with M/V Filipinas Iligan of CSLI, which traverse the Ozamiz-Cebu route, but in her opposite schedule which was appeared every night around midnight in the vicinity of Lazi, Siquijor. On July 10, 2019 she was caught fire while under repair at FF Cruz Wharf, Pier 8, Mandaue City, Cebu around 4AM One of the 36 crew got minor injuries.	
M/V Trans-Asia 3	IMO number: 8807131	Ferry	1989	2008	2908	110.00 m (360.89 ft)	16.02 m (52.6 ft)	M/V Trans-Asia 3 was formerly known as New Shikoku of Shikoku Ferry Line of Japan until it was acquired by the company in 2008. This passenger vessel has a length of 110 meters and can travel up to 20 knots.	The Trans-Asia 3 in Cebu Port
M/V Trans-Asia 10	IMO number: 7912783	Ferry	1979	2014	3998	110.00 m (360.89 ft)	19.00 m (62.34 ft)	MV Trans-Asia 10 is the former M/V Princess of the Earth of Sulpicio Lines which is now Philippine Span Asia Carrier Corporation.	
M/V Trans-Asia 18	IMO number: 9199218	Ferry	1998	2018	2334	93.60 m (307.1 ft)	16.00 m (52.49 ft)	Acquired from Japan, Ex-Sakura of Uwajima Transport Ferry.	The Trans-Asia 18 to be Docked at Macabalan Port.
M/V Trans-Asia 19	IMO number: 9831995	Ferry	2018		2976	67.60 m (221.8 ft)	15.30 m (50.2 ft)	A newly built RORO/Passenger vessel from Kegoya Dock in Japan.	
M/V Trans-Asia 21 (Flagship)	IMO number: 9901116	Ferry	2021		8971	122.75 m (402.7 ft)	20.00 m (65.62 ft)	A brand new 123 meter Bed/Seat RORO/Passenger ferry, built at Fukuoka Shipbuilding in Japan and has a capacity 1,085 passengers; she replaced MV Trans-Asia 20 on the Cebu - Cagayan De Oro route.	

Cargo vessels (5 ships)
Name	IMO	Type	Launched	Tonnage	Length	Breadth	Notes	Image
M/V Asia Pacific	IMO number: 8105844	Freighter	1981	1377	89.67 m (294.2 ft)	14.00 m (45.93 ft)	M/V Asia Pacific was acquired by Trans-Asia in 1997.	MV Asia Pacific
M/V Trans-Asia 12	IMO number: 9189263	Freighter	1998	3508	98.00 m (321.52 ft)	16.00 m (52.49 ft)	M/V Trans-Asia 12 was acquired in 2016. She has a capacity of 175 twenty-foot equivalent units (TEU).	
M/V Trans-Asia 15	IMO number: 9117777	Freighter	1995	6384	115.02 m (377.4 ft)	18.24 m (59.8 ft)		
M/V Trans-Asia 16	IMO number: 9146792	Freighter	1996	6251	115.02 m (377.4 ft)	18.20 m (59.7 ft)		
M/V Trans-Asia 15	IMO number: 9196345	Freighter	1999	6543	119.16 m (390.9 ft)	18.20 m (59.7 ft)		

== Former Fleet ==
=== M/V Trans-Asia 8 (IMO number: 8312980) ===
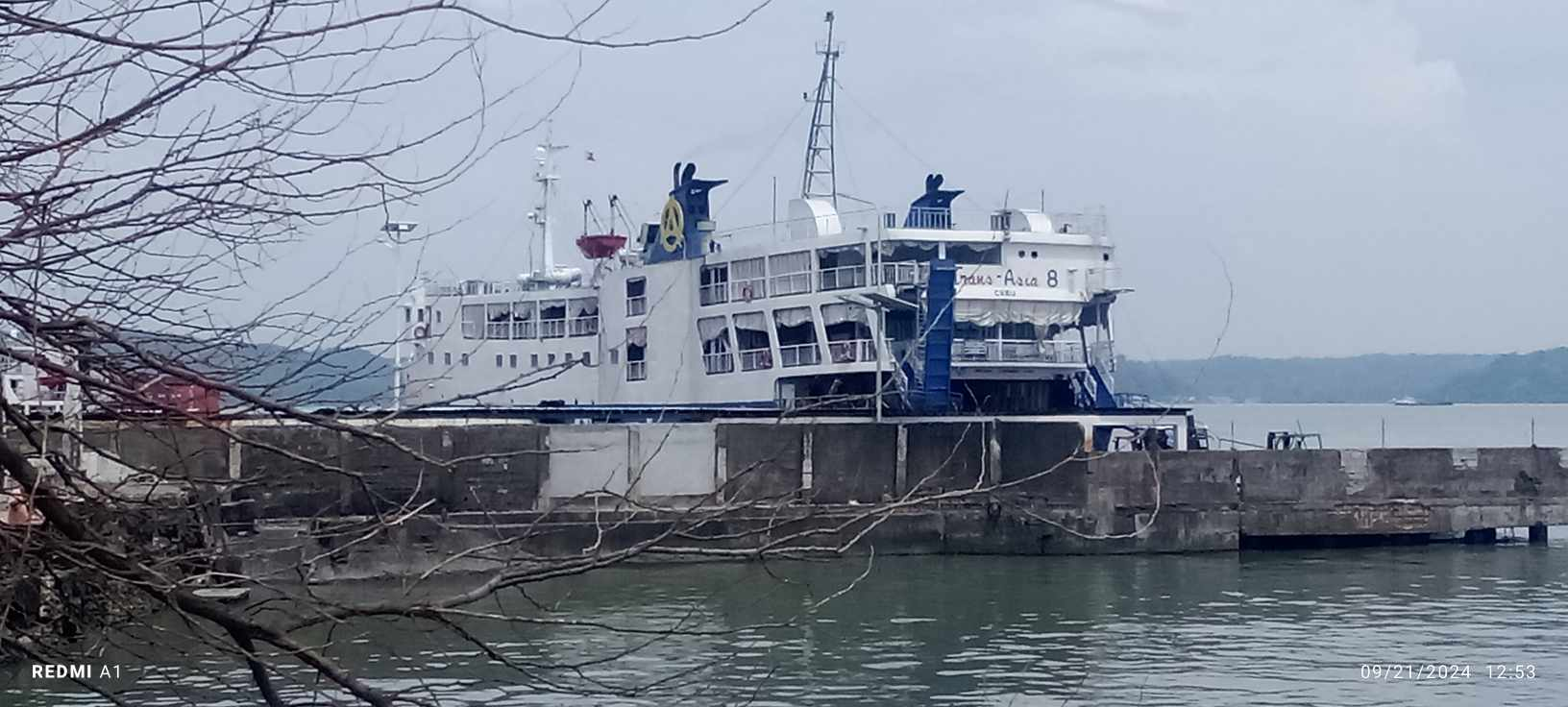
MV Trans Asia 8 docked in Fort San Pedro, Iloilo City

Trans-Asia acquired this ship in early 2011. This ship used to be Doña Rita Sr. of Gothong Southern. In September 2026, the ship was retired from service and was sold to Gabisan Shipping Lines where the ship is renamed to M/V Gloria Eight.

=== M/V Trans-Asia 2 (IMO number: 7620744) ===
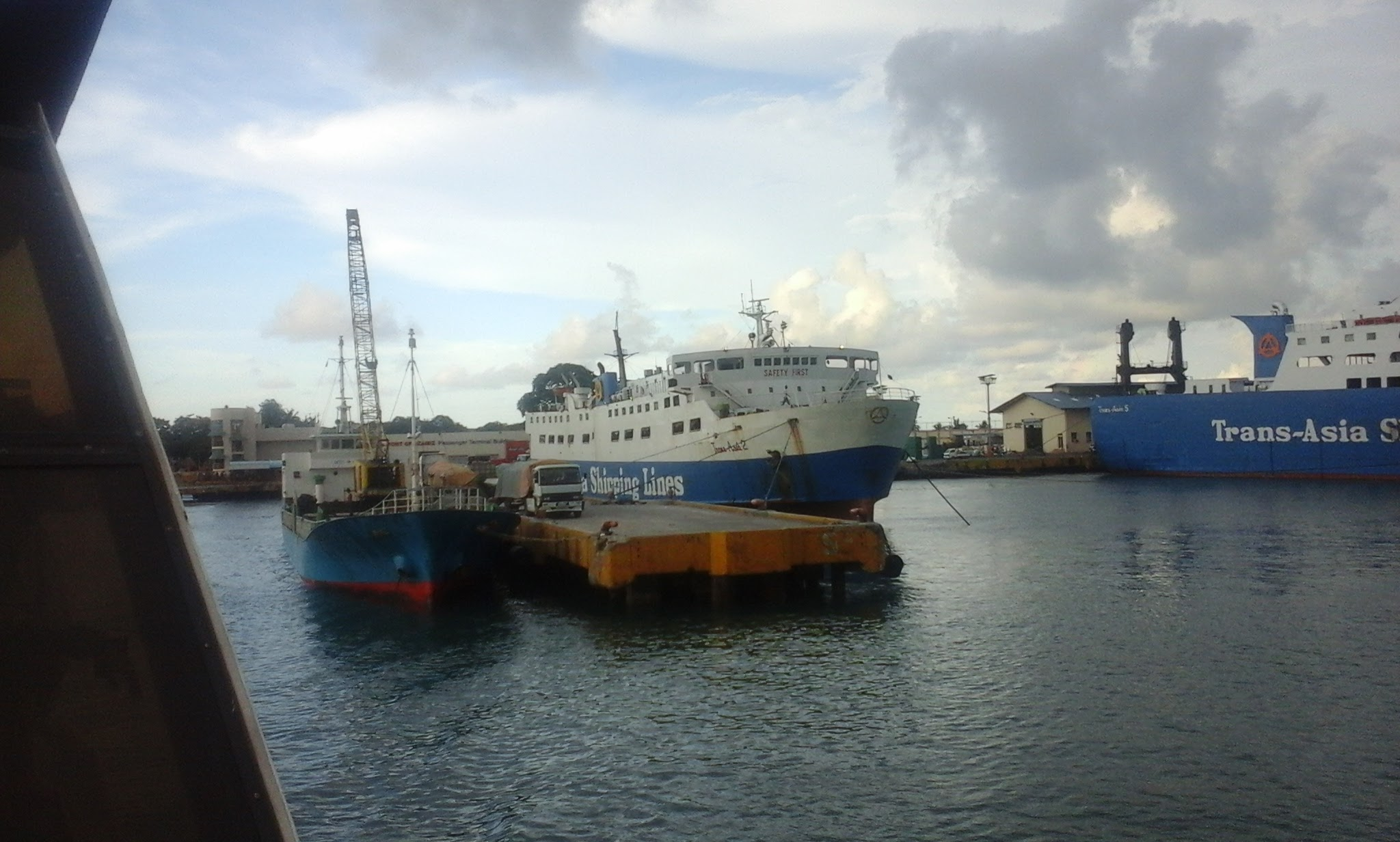
The Trans-Asia 2 dock at Ozamiz Port

Formerly known as Lite Ferry I of Lite Shipping Corporation, the vessel was acquired by Trans-Asia Shipping Lines, Inc. in 1998 and subsequently renamed Trans-Asia 2. In 2026, the ship was officially retired after being deemed economically unviable for repair and restoration. It was later sold to a local scrap buyer and dismantled at Mandaue City, Cebu.

=== M/V Trans-Asia 20 (IMO number: 9858369) ===
A 98 meter RORO/Passenger ferry built at Kegoya Dock in Japan, she was designed to carry 690 passengers and was assigned on Cebu to Cagayan de Oro route. In 2021, she left Trans-Asia fleet and was transferred to its sister company, Starlite Ferries and renamed as MV Starlite Phoenix.

=== M/V Trans-Asia 5 (Former Flagship) ===
M/V Trans-Asia 5, former Butuan Bay 1 of Carlos A. Gothong Lines Inc. (CAGLI). Trans-Asia acquired this ship in the early 2010 and completed reconfiguring the vessel in December 2010 and she serves Cebu to Masbate route as a cargo vessel. Her passenger decks were removed due to Permit Cancellation.

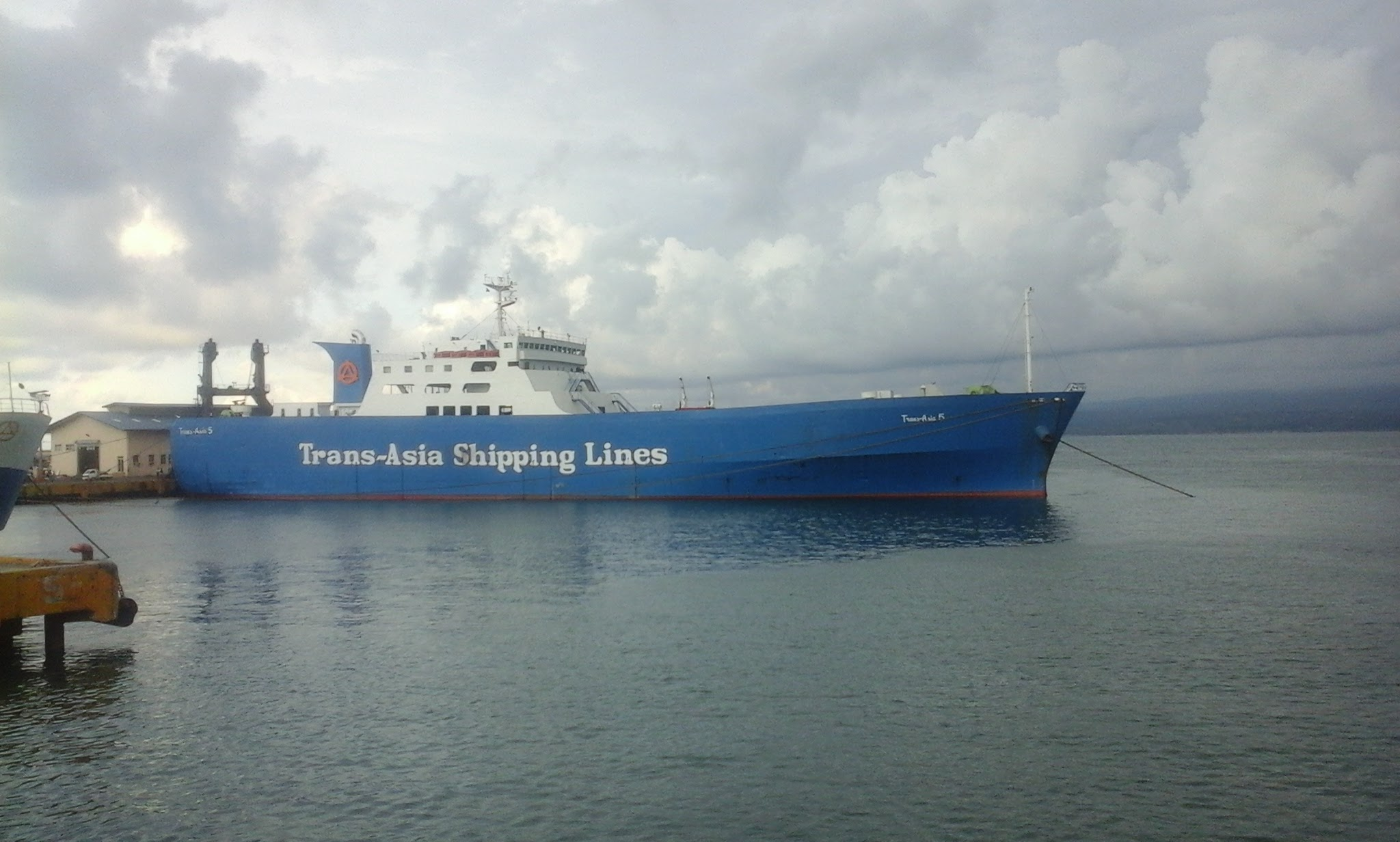
The Trans-Asia 5 dock at Ozamiz Port

She was built by Iwagi Zosen in the Iwagi shipyard for the shipping company Keiyo Kisen and she was completed in February 1989.

=== M/V Trans-Asia 9 ===
Trans-Asia acquired this ship in early 2012. This ship was the Ferry Kikai of A" Line in Japan, Mabuhay 6 of WG&A Shipping Lines, Our Lady of Good Voyage of Cebu Ferries (later 2Go Travel) and Doña Conchita Sr. of Gothong Southern. She was scrapped in TASLI Wharf at FF.Cruz Mandaue City.

=== M/V Asia China ===
The vessel ended its service last February 2013 and sold to Breakers and was scrapped in Cebu shipyard.

=== M/V Trans-Asia ===
M/V Trans-Asia was owned by the Sado Kisen Car Ferry of Japan, and was acquired by Trans-Asia/Solar in 1993. M/V Trans-Asia's sister ship is M/V Asia China. The vessel was broken down in Navotas

=== M/V Asia Malaysia ===
M/V Asia Malaysia was acquired by Trans-Asia in 1997 and used to serve Cebu City to Iloilo City route. She sank off the coast of Ajuy, Iloilo in 2011. 134 passengers and 44 crewmembers on board was bound for Iloilo from Cebu when it sank.

All 178 people on board were rescued by fishermen and other passing vessels like the MV Filipinas Cebu and MV Phil Visayas, assisted by the PCG.

=== M/V Asia Japan ===
M/V Asia Japan sold to Santa Clara Shipping and renamed as M/V Nathan Matthew

=== M/V Asia South Korea ===
M/V Asia South Korea was acquired by the company in 1972 and also was used to serve Cebu City to Iloilo City route. She ran aground and sank off Bantayan Island in Cebu on December 22, 1999, due to stormy weather and high seas, killing 56 of its passengers.

=== M/V Asia Hongkong ===
This vessel was sold to Montenegro Lines and renamed as M/V Reina del Rosario

=== M/V Asia Brunei ===
Asia Brunei was sold to Navios Lines as M/V Grand Unity.

=== M/V Asia Singapore ===
Asia Singapore was sold to FJ Palacio Lines and renamed as M/V Calbayog. M/V Calbayog was sold to Starlite Ferries Inc. and renamed as M/V Starlite Neptune.

=== M/V Asia Thailand ===
This vessel was destroyed by fire while docked at the Port of Cebu.

=== M/V Asia Taiwan ===
The vessel was sold to Asian Marine Transport System and renamed as M/V Super Shuttle Ferry 7 then capsized in Manila Bay.

=== M/V Asia Indonesia ===
The vessel was sold to Navios Lines as M/V Grand Venture.

== Ports of call and Routes ==
=== Ports of call ===
Trans-Asia Shipping Lines has 11 ports of call—7 passenger/cargo ports and 4 cargo-only ports. With Cebu as the company's home port, it serves destinations such as:

Map of Trans-Asia's Ports of Call. Blue: Trans-Asia Hubs, Red: Passenger/Cargo, Black: Cargoes only

Region	Province	City/Town	Port	Status
Luzon	National Capital Region	Manila	Port of Manila	Cargoes only
Luzon	Masbate	Masbate City	Port of Masbate	
Visayas	Iloilo	Iloilo City	Fort San Pedro	
Visayas	Cebu	Cebu City	Pier 5 Reclamation Area	Hub
Visayas	Bohol	Tagbilaran	Port of Tagbilaran	
Mindanao	Zamboanga	Zamboanga City	Port of Zamboanga	Cargoes only
Mindanao	Misamis Oriental	Cagayan de Oro	Port of Cagayan de Oro	
Mindanao	Lanao del Norte	Iligan	Port of Iligan	
Mindanao	Misamis Occidental	Ozamiz	Port of Ozamiz	
Mindanao	Davao del Sur	Davao City	Sasa Wharf	Cargoes only
Mindanao	South Cotabato	General Santos	Port of General Santos	Cargoes only

=== Routes ===
As of September 2026:

ROPAX (roro cargo and passengers)

- Cebu–Cagayan de Oro v.v. — TA21
- Cebu–Iligan (via Ozamiz) — TA18
- Cebu–Iloilo v.v. — TA3
- Cebu–Masbate v.v. — TA3
- Cebu–Ozamiz v.v. — TA18
- Cebu–Tagbilaran v.v. — TA19
- Cagayan de Oro–Tagbilaran v.v. — TA19
- Iligan–Ozamiz v.v. — TA18

Freighter (Cargoes Only)

== Subsidiaries ==
- Quality Metal & Shipworks, Inc. – engaged in machining and mechanical works on ship machineries and industrial plants.
- Oceanstar Shipping, Inc. – engaged in the business of domestic shipping for the transportation of passengers and cargoes within territorial waters and/or on the high seas.
- Dynamic Cuisine, Inc. – engaged in operating restaurants, coffee shops, refreshment parlors, cocktail lounges, bars, and in cooking and catering foods, drinks, refreshments and other foods or commodities.
- Starsy Shoppe, Inc. – engaged in the purchase of all kinds of food and beverage products and merchandise, except rice and corn, locally and/or through importation for purposes of selling the same on retail or wholesale, either local and/or through importation.

== See also ==
- 2GO Travel
- Montenegro Lines
- Cokaliong Shipping Lines
- Supercat Fast Ferry Corporation
- Roble Shipping Inc.
- List of shipping companies in the Philippines
