= Starlite Ferries =

Shipping company in the Philippines

- Type: Private Company
- Industry: Shipping
- Founded: 1995; 31 years ago in Batangas City
- Founder: Alfonso Cusi
- Headquarters: Rizal Avenue Corner P. Dandan St. Batangas City
- Area served: Philippines
- Key people: Dennis Uy (Chairman); Chryss Alfonsus V. Damuy (President & CEO); Shane Anthony Arante (General Manager)
- Owner: Chelsea Logistics Holdings Corporation
- Website: starliteferries.com chelseatravel.ph

Starlite Ferries is a passenger ferry company based in Batangas City, Batangas, Philippines owned and operated by Chelsea Logistics Holdings Corp., a Manila-based logistics company. It mainly serves the provinces of Batangas, Oriental Mindoro, Romblon, Aklan, Cebu and Surigao del Norte and is one of the leading ferry companies operating in the Mimaropa and Western Visayas regions.

== History ==
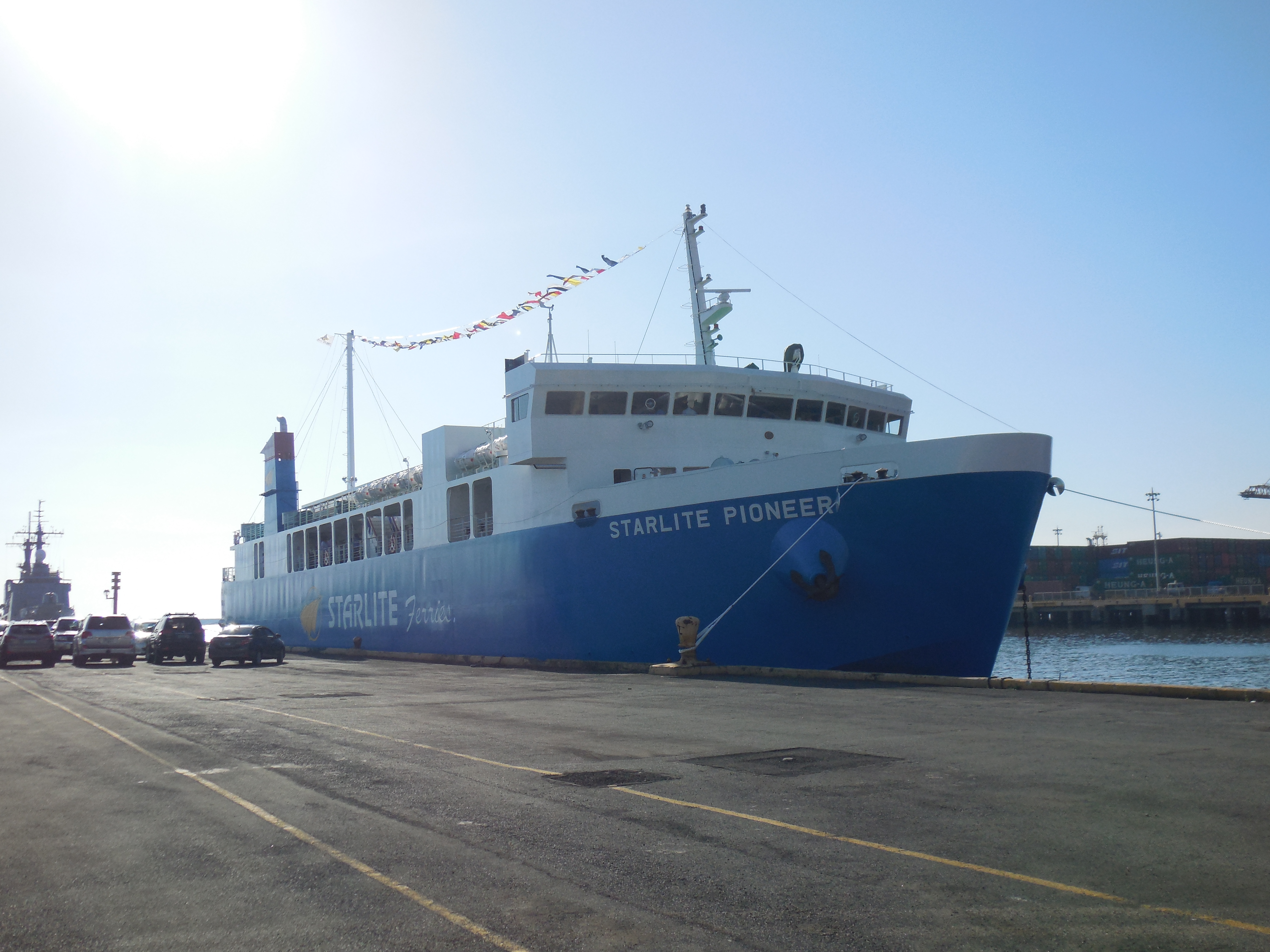
MV Starlite Pioneer berthed at the Manila South Harbor in December 2015

Starlite Ferries Inc. started operations in 1995 with its first vessel MV Starlite Ferry. It began at a time when trade and commerce in Mindoro started to flourish. MV Starlite Ferry served the Calapan to Batangas route which then had a daily average passenger traffic of 10,000 people and an average vehicle count of 1,500 to 2,000 units. There was an increasing demand for sea transportation of the people of Mindoro and Starlite was the first to respond to this challenge.

In September 2017, Chelsea Logistics Holdings Corp. (CLC), a logistics company owned by Filipino entrepreneur Dennis Uy under Udenna Corporation, acquired Starlite Ferries, Inc. from the Cusi family. Uy also owns Philippine interisland ferry companies Supercat Fast Ferry Corporation and Trans-Asia Shipping Lines.

In August 2018, Starlite Ferries became the first Philippine ferry company to operate the Japanese convenience store FamilyMart branches. Four of the company's RORO ferries, MV Starlite Pioneer, MV Starlite Jupiter, MV Starlite Pacific and MV SWM Salve Regina each opened a FamilyMart store on board. The first three ferries operate along the Batangas-Calapan route while the last ferry operates along the Batangas-Caticlan route. The opening of the convenience stores follows Starlite Ferries owner Dennis Uy's acquisition of the Philippine franchise of FamilyMart.

== Routes ==
As of October 2025, Starlite Ferries serve the following destinations:

From	To
Batangas City, Batangas	Calapan, Oriental Mindoro
Batangas City, Batangas	Caticlan Port, Malay, Aklan
Batangas City, Batangas	Roxas City, Capiz
Batangas City, Batangas	Romblon, Romblon
Batangas City, Batangas	Sibuyan, Romblon (Magdiwang)
Batangas City, Batangas	Odiongan, Romblon
Batangas City, Batangas	Dumaguit Port, New Washington, Aklan (soon)
Roxas, Oriental Mindoro	Caticlan Port, Malay, Aklan
Roxas, Oriental Mindoro	Odiongan, Romblon (suspended)
Cebu City	Surigao City, Surigao del Norte
Cebu City	Nasipit, Agusan del Norte
Cebu City	Pulauan Port, Dapitan, Zamboanga del Norte
Cebu City	Larena, Siquijor (suspended)
Cebu City	Oroquieta City, Misamis Occidental (suspended)
Cebu City	Tagbilaran City, Bohol (suspended)
Bacolod	Dumangas, Iloilo

== Fleet ==
=== Current fleet ===
Starlite Ferries currently has a fleet of 19 RORO ferries, 1 high speed craft, and 1 cargo ship:

Roll on/Roll off (RORO)

- MV Starlite Annapolis (IMO number: 8125624)
- MV Starlite Archer (IMO number: 9772486)
- MV Starlite Eagle (IMO number: 9772474)
- MV Starlite Ferry (IMO number: 7235422)
- MV Starlite Gratitude (IMO number: 1073573)
- MV Starlite Jupiter (IMO number: 8822076)
- MV Starlite Navigator (IMO number: 7118727)
- MV Starlite Pacific (IMO number: 8301395)
- MV Starlite Phoenix (MV Trans Asia 20) (IMO number: 9858369)
- MV Starlite Polaris (IMO number: 8895700)
- MV Starlite Pioneer (IMO number: 9766504)
- MV Starlite Reliance (IMO number: 9766516)
- MV Starlite Resilience (IMO number: 1073561)
- MV Starlite Saturn (IMO number: 9766528)
- MV Starlite Stella Maris (IMO number: 9852298)
- MV SWM Stella Del Mar (IMO number: 9798521)
- MV SWM Salve Regina (IMO number: 9831983)
- MV Starlite Saga (IMO number: 7434262) (Formerly MV Asia Philippines, Burned in Batangas in 26 August 2022. Repaired and returned to service in 2025.)
- MV Starlite Venus (IMO number: 9858371)

High Speed Craft

- MV Starlite Sprint 1 (IMO number: 9882695)

Cargo vessels

- MV Starlite Tamaraw (IMO number: 9876543)

=== Former Fleet ===
Roll on/Roll off (RORO)

- MV Starlite Atlantic (IMO number: 7501534) (sank off the coast of Tingloy, Batangas)
- MV Starlite Voyager (IMO number: 7405338)
- MV Starlite Odyssey (IMO number: 7046637)
- MV Starlite Neptune (IMO number: 7044225)
- MV Starlite Polaris (IMO number: 8895700)
- MV Starlite Ferry (IMO number: 7235422) (sold to Jomalia Shipping Corporation, and renamed as MV Mika Mari 7)

High Speed Craft

- MV Starlite Juno

=== Gallery ===
Starlite Ferries vessels

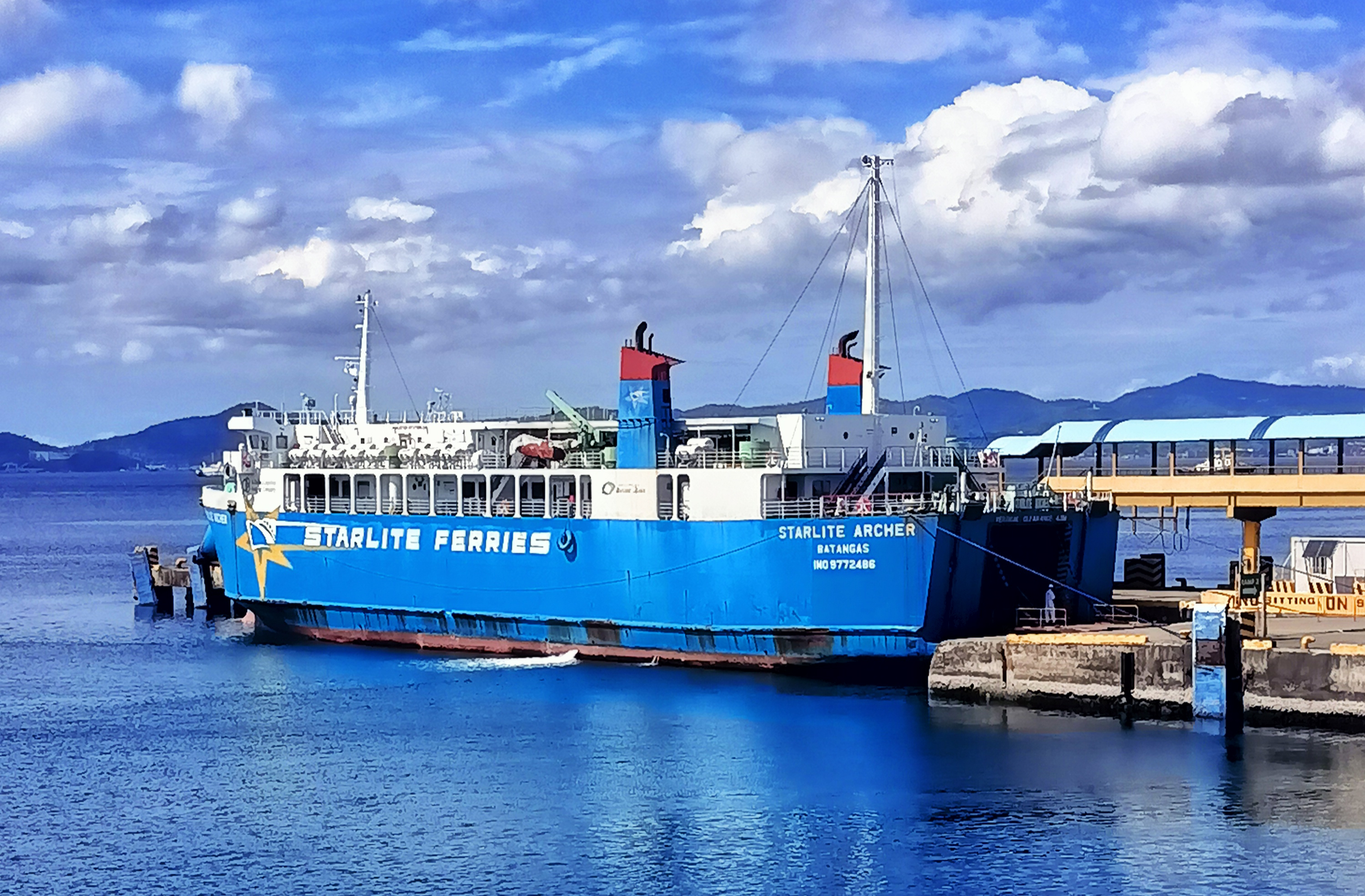
MV Starlite Archer docked at the Batangas International Port

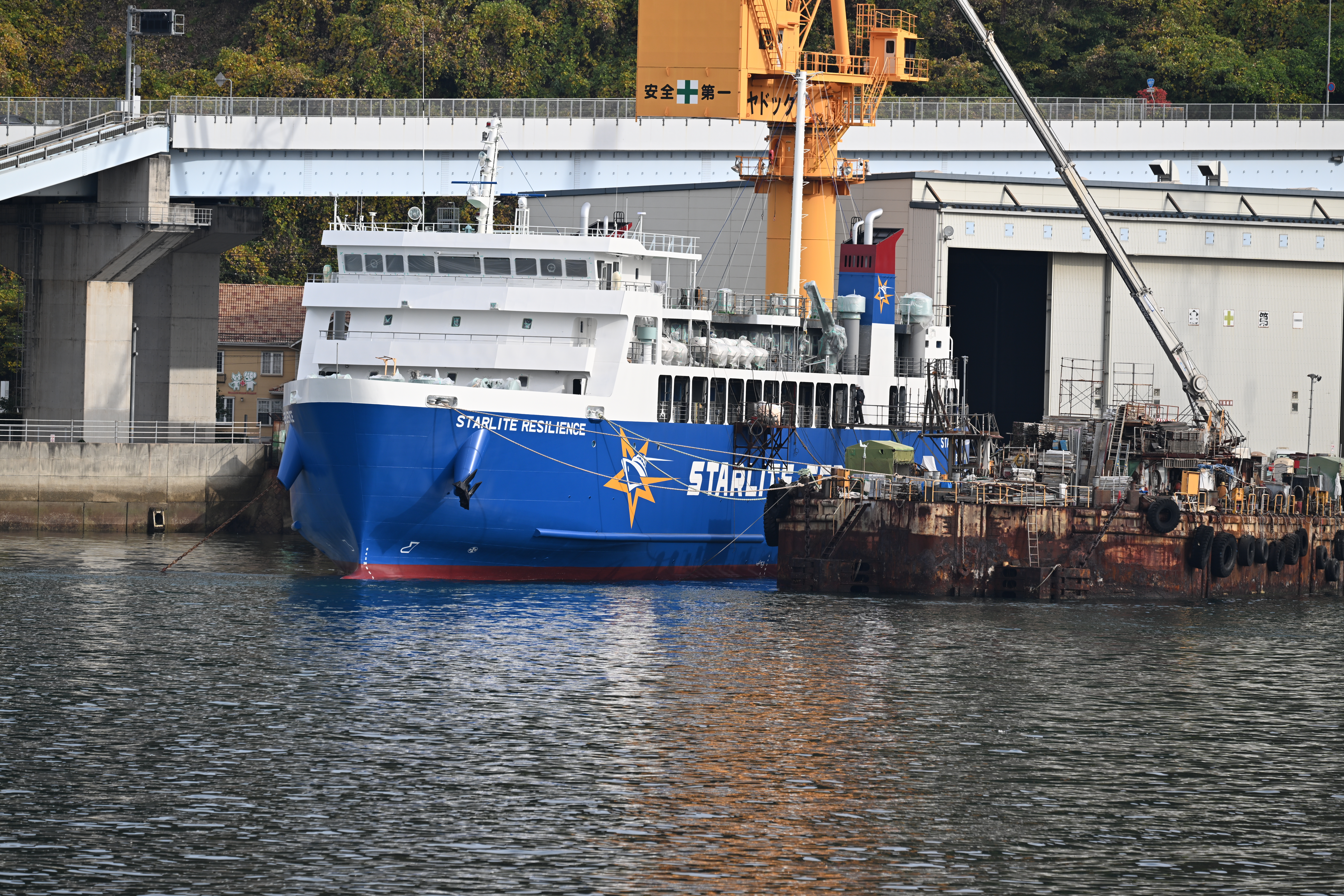
MV Starlite Resilience under construction in Japan in 2025.

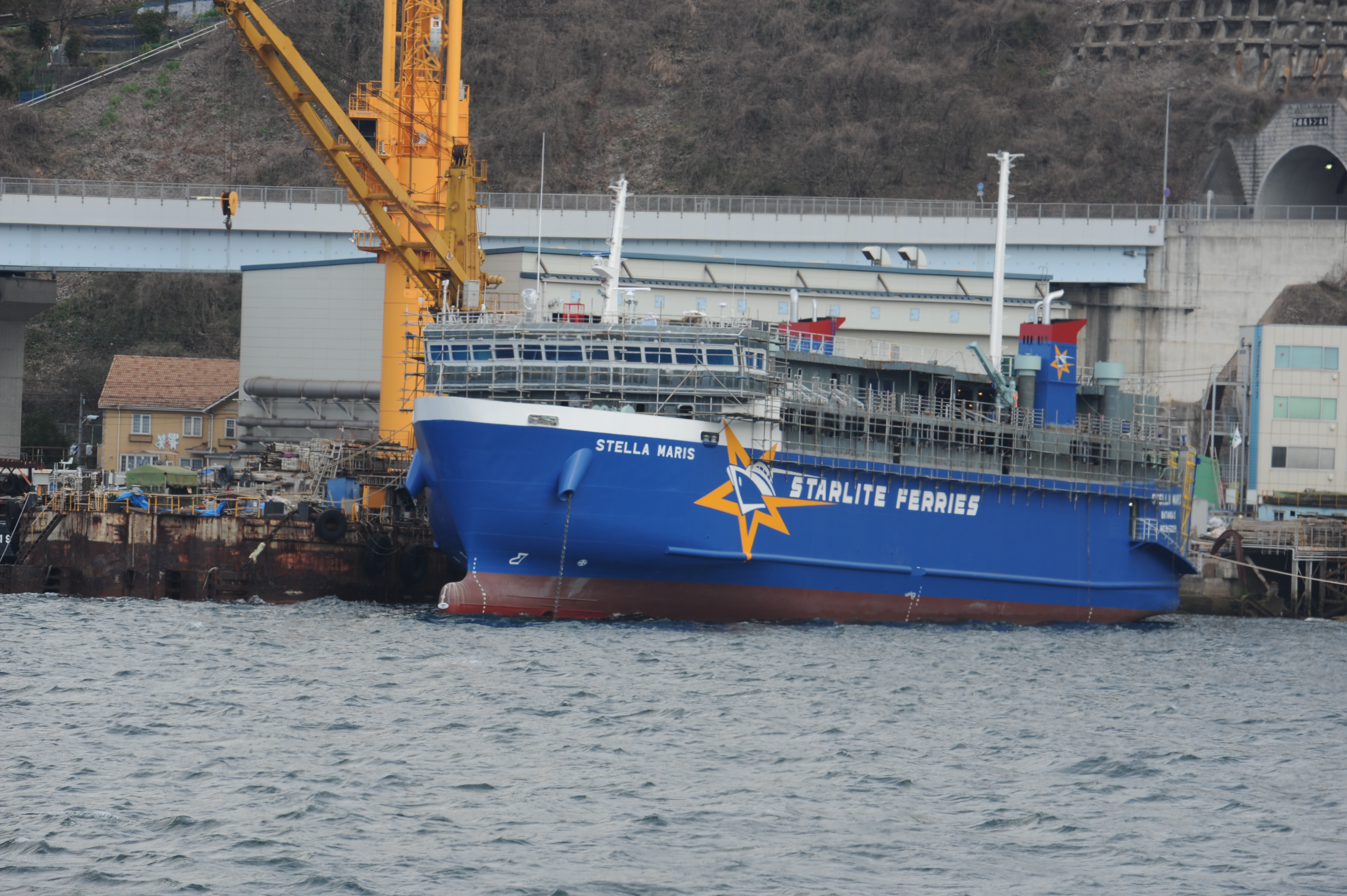
MV Stella Maris under construction in Japan in 2019.

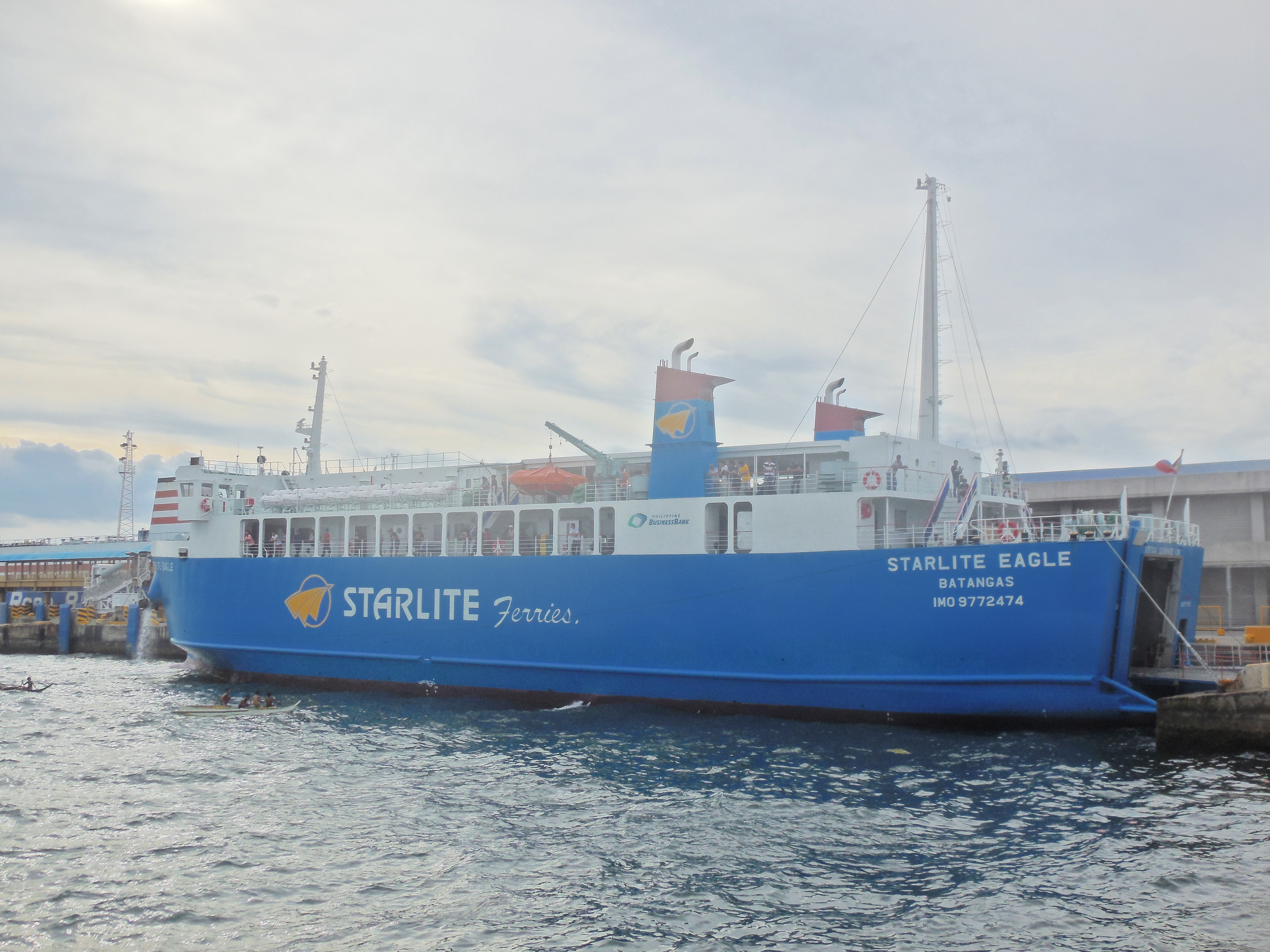
MV Starlite Eagle docked at the Batangas International Port in August 2016

== Incidents and accidents ==
- On 26 December 2016, MV Starlite Atlantic sank off the coast of Tingloy, Batangas during the onslaught of Typhoon Nina (international name: Nock-ten). The vessel was anchored in Batangas Bay when the typhoon passed over it with winds of up to 185 km/h in the center and gusts of 215 km/h. The typhoon generated huge waves between six and eight meters in height, causing the vessel to come off its mooring and drift toward Tingloy where it sank. One person died and 18 were reported missing in the incident, while the Philippine Coast Guard rescued 15 out of the 34 crew.
- On 26 August 2022, MV Asia Philippines, a RORO ferry owned by Trans-Asia Shipping Lines, but operated by Starlite Ferries at the time of the incident, caught fire around 5:30 p.m., a few meters off the Port of Batangas in Batangas City. According to the Philippine Coast Guard, there were 82 passengers and 15 vehicles on board the vessel when it caught fire. There were no fatalities and all passengers and crew were rescued in the incident, although a 44-year-old woman was injured during the incident.
