= Lite Shipping Corporation =

Cebu-based shipping line

Lite Shipping Corporation - Lite Ferries
- Type: Private company
- Industry: Ferry Services
- Founded: 1989; 37 years ago
- Founder: Lucio E. Lim Jr.
- Headquarters: 14 G.L Lavilles Street, Corner M.J Cuenco, Tinago, Cebu City, Philippines
- Area served: Batangas, Visayas, and Northern Mindanao
- Key people: Lucio E. Lim Jr. (President & CEO)
- Parent: Lite Holdings, Inc.
- Website: www.liteferries.com.ph

Lite Shipping Corporation, is a Cebu-based shipping line, that operates the Lite Ferries, a brand consisting of a fleet of 28 ships. The corporation has its origins from Bohol, and is the flagship company of Lite Holdings, Inc. At present, the corporation also owns and manages Danilo Lines, Inc. and Sunline Shipping Corporation.

Logo of Lite Ferries.

== History ==
The company was a wholly owned subsidiary of Lirio Enterprises, Inc., a general trading firm doing business nationwide. It started as a shipping division of the mother company in the middle of 1988 when it bought two vessels, the M/V Sto. Niño de Soledad, a 500-ton DWT capacity steel-hulled vessel and the M/V Sto. Niño, a wooden hull 200-ton capacity vessel. Initially, the cargo loaded was mostly goods traded by Lirio Enterprises, Inc. like salt, rice, cement, fertilizers, sugar, etc. Sometimes they would accept other cargoes for backload when the occasion demands it. This shipping division was spun off as a separate shipping corporation in July 1989 when the Philippine Securities and Exchange Commission approved the Articles of Incorporation and by-laws of Lite Shipping Corporation.

The fleet then consisted of 12 passenger vessels and 3 cargo ships. In November 1991, the corporation acquired its third vessel, the M/V St. Gabriel, a steel-hulled 30-ton capacity cargo boat due to the strong demand for the smaller cargo vessel in the trading operation of the mother company. In January 1992, the company expanded with the purchase of a 175 gross-ton roro car/truck carrier from the U.S. Navy, the LCT St. Mark. It has a capacity of four ten-wheeler cargo trucks, five cars and 50 to 70 passengers. It is the franchise holder for the Argao, Cebu to Loon, Bohol route as a daily car/truck ferry.

In 2010, the Lite Shipping Corporation launched a new corporate brand name, along with a more contemporary and dynamic company logo, for all its vessels, now known as the Lite Ferries.

In November 2019, Lite Ferries bought the now-defunct George and Peter Lines. The corporation took over the company's routes and obtained their vessels following the acquisition.

== Lite Holdings, Inc. ==
Lite Holdings, Inc. was formed as a holding company with the following corporations under its umbrella:

1. Lite Shipping Corporation - Owns and manages Danilo Lines, Inc. and Sunline Shipping Corporation. The management team is headed by COO Engr. Fernando A. Inting and OIC Jonathan Lim-Imboy.
2. Cebu Lite Trading, Inc. - Was established in 1991 as a distributor of local cement brands and is also engaged in the importation of rice from Vietnam and Thailand as well as a major cement importer. The OIC for Cebu Lite Trading is Rowena Imboy-Lim.
3. Lirio Shipping Lines, Inc. - Currently being led by Raymund Lim-Revilles as the OIC and he has steered the company into a major provider of LCT barges for the mining industry. They are also into ship management.
4. Lite Properties Corporation - Engaged in real estate development particularly economic and low cost housing as well as strip mall development in Cebu and Bohol. OIC for Lite Properties is Atty. Dominique D. Lim and ably assisted by Rochelle Brigitte Lim-Imboy.
5. Lou's Square Development Corporation - Operates the hotel and restaurant business of Soledad Suites in Tagbilaran City as well as Casa Filomena Resort in Panglao and Pamilacan Island Paradise, all in Bohol where the Lim Family traces their roots.

== Fleet ==
=== Current Vessels ===
As of August 2026, Lite Ferries operates a fleet of 26 passenger and cargo ferries. The company also operates two cargo roll-on/roll-off landing craft tank (LCT) vessels, Lite Ferry 26 and Lite Ferry 28. Lite Ferries is expected to receive six brand-new vessels from China, with deliveries scheduled between 2026 and 2028. The acquisition aims to expand fleet capacity and modernize the company’s inter-island ferry services in the Philippines.

Name	IMO	Notes	Image
Lite Ferry 1	IMO number: 7005530	A sister ship of the M/V Lite Ferry 2, the ship previously operated as the M/V Danilo 1 under Danilo Lines Inc., prior to the company’s acquisition by Lite Shipping Corporation.	
Lite Ferry 2	IMO number: 6926969	A sister ship of the M/V Lite Ferry 1, the ship previously operated as the M/V Danilo 2 under Danilo Lines Inc., before the company was acquired by Lite Shipping Corporation.	
Lite Ferry Three	IMO number: 7212896	She was formerly the Our Lady of Mount Carmel of Cebu Ferries and later operated as GP Ferry 2 under the now-defunct George and Peter Lines, before being acquired by Lite Ferries. She serves as the replacement vessel for the former Lite Ferry 3.	
Lite Ferry Five	IMO number: 9873321	A brand new ship made in China.	
Lite Ferry Six	IMO number: 9970088	Acquired by Lite Ferries in 2023, sister ship of M/V Lite Ferry Seven	
Lite Ferry Seven	IMO number: 9970090	The current M/V Lite Ferry Seven has a length overall of 72 meters, a breadth of 18.60 meters, and a depth of 4.5 meters. The vessel has a gross tonnage of 2,450 tons and can accommodate up to 300 passengers, 18 ten-wheeler trucks, and 10 cars. It is an IACS-classed vessel under RINA (Italy).	
Lite Ferry 8	IMO number: 7323205	The ship is 75 meters in length and has a capacity of nearly 800 passengers, along with 18 trucks or buses. It was acquired in 2007 as GP Ferry 1 from George & Peter Lines, and was formerly the M/V Santa Maria of Negros Navigation.	
Lite Ferry Nine	IMO number: 9886299	A new ship made in China.	
Lite Ferry Ten	IMO number: 1086465	The vessel was launched in China on November 10, 2024, and is a sister ship of the M/V Lite Ferry Twelve.	
Lite Ferry 11	IMO number: 8618499	She was acquired by Lite Ferries in 2010 along with three other vessels, previously operating as Misaki No. 5 of Oishi Shipping in Japan. The vessel measures 65.7 meters in length, 15 meters in breadth, and 3.5 meters in depth, with a gross tonnage of 462.	
Lite Ferry Twelve	IMO number: 1086477	The vessel was launched in China on November 10, 2024, and is a sister ship of the M/V Lite Ferry Ten.	
Lite Ferry 15	IMO number: 7853286	The vessel was acquired in 2010 from Japan and has a length of 60.3 meters, a beam of 11.4 meters, a gross tonnage of 827, and a net tonnage of 562.	
Lite Ferry 16		Te vessel was acquired in 2015 from Hainan Strait Shipping Company (HNSS) in China and was converted into a modified landing craft tank (LCT), featuring a car ramp at the bow and two partial passenger decks below the bridge, with one extending nearly to amidships, resulting in a passenger area significantly higher than that of a conventional LCT.	
Lite Ferry 17		The ship arrived in 2016 from China alongside her sister ship, M/V Lite Ferry 18, and was formerly known as Bao Dao 5.	
Lite Ferry 18	IMO number: 8773885	The vessel was acquired in 2016 from China, is a sister ship of the M/V Lite Ferry 17, and was formerly known as Bao Dao 6.	
Lite Ferry 19	IMO number: 8773897	The ship was acquired in 2016 from Hainan Strait Shipping Company (HNSS) in China and is a sister ship of the M/V Lite Ferry 16.	
Lite Ferry Twenty	IMO number: 1153165	The vessel was built by Ningbo Sheng Hao Ship Engineering Co., Ltd. in China. Construction began in July 2025, and the vessel was launched in January 2026 in Ningbo, China. It is classed under RINA of Italy.	
Lite Ferry Twenty One	TBA	Currently being built at Ningbo, China.	
Lite Ferry 21	IMO number: 8426004	The ship was acquired in 2012, previously operating as the LCT Dona Trinidad 1 of Candano Shipping Lines in Bicol.	
Lite Ferry 22	IMO number: 8944941	Acquired in 2008 as the former LCT Socor 1 of Socor Shipping Lines, she was named LCT Sto. Nino de Bohol.	
Lite Ferry 23		The ship was the fourth vessel acquired by the company in 2010 and is considered unique as a catamaran RORO with a profile resembling an LCT from the side. The vessel measures 57.5 meters in length and 16.0 meters in beam, with a gross tonnage of 496.88.	
Lite Ferry 25	IMO number: 9645528	The vessel was acquired in 2012 from China, measuring 49.3 meters long and 13.8 meters wide.	
Lite Ferry 26		The ship was bought from China in 2015, formerly known as the Diomicka.	
Lite Ferry 27		The ship was bought brand new from China in 2015, measuring 62.18 meters long and 16.8 meters wide, with a gross tonnage of 898.65.	
Lite Ferry 28		The ship was bought from China in 2015 along with Lite Ferry 26, and was formerly known as the Maria Dulce.	
Lite Ferry 29	IMO number: 9814296	She is a landing craft tank (LCT) acquired brand new from China.	
Lite Ferry 30	IMO number: 9814301	The ship is a landing craft transport (LCT) vessel with an overall length of 71.40 meters, a length between perpendiculars of 56.50 meters, a breadth of 16.80 meters, a depth of 4.20 meters, and a draft of 2.50 meters. The vessel features two passenger decks with a maximum capacity of 387 passengers, including both lying and sitting accommodations. Her wagon/cargo deck can carry four 10-wheeler trucks or 18 cars.	
Lite Ferry Thirty One	TBA	Coming soon	
Lite Ferry Thirty Two	TBA	Coming soon	
Lite Cat 1	IMO number: 9755529	Formerly known as M/V Lite Ferry 88, the ship is the company’s first fast catamaran vessel. She currently operates on the Cebu–Tubigon route and vice versa.	
Lite Cat 2	IMO number: 9885609	This RORO catamaran vessel was built by PT Karimun in Batam, Indonesia. It is an IACS-classed vessel registered under the Lloyd’s Register of London. The vessel has a length overall of 71.40 meters and a breadth of 20.00 meters, and is powered by four Yanmar marine diesel engines. It currently operates on the Cebu–Tubigon route and vice versa.	
Lite Cat 3	TBA	Coming soon	

=== Former Vessels ===
Name	IMO	Notes	Image
Georich	IMO number: 5246269	This vessel is one of the oldest ferries in the country, at 59 years old. It is a cruiser with a gross tonnage of 694 and was formerly operated by the now-defunct George & Peter Lines.	
Lite Ferry 10 (first generation)		There have been two vessels named Lite Ferry 10. The first was a double-ended ferry measuring 46.0 meters in length, 10.0 meters in beam, and 3.8 meters in depth, with a net tonnage of 165. This vessel had a sister ship, the Lite Ferry 9, which was later sold. The first Lite Ferry 10 was sold to Medallion Transport in 2011, where it was renamed Lady of Miraculous Medal.	
Lite Ferry 10 (second generation)	IMO number: 8618695	The second Lite Ferry 10 was formerly the Ocean King I of Seamarine Transport Incorporated. The ship was initially acquired as a charter before being purchased outright by the company.	
Lite Ferry 12	IMO number: 8405244	The ship was acquired in 2010 from Japan and measures 41.6 meters in length, 9.6 meters in breadth, and 5.6 meters in depth, with a gross tonnage of 249. She was later sold to Aleson Shipping Lines.	
Lite Jet 1		Sold to Ocean Fast Ferries, Inc., renamed Ocean Jet 11	
Lite Jet 8		Built in China, the vessel was originally known as Aquan Two in Hong Kong and later operated as Nonan 2 in Vietnam before being acquired by the company. The vessel was subsequently sold to Ocean Fast Ferries and renamed Ocean Jet 12.	
Lite Jet 9		Built in China, the vessel was originally known as Aquan One in Hong Kong and later as Nonan 1 in Vietnam before being acquired alongside Lite Jet 8. The vessel was subsequently sold to Ocean Fast Ferries and renamed Ocean Jet 10.	
Lite Ferry 5		The ship was acquired in 2005 as the former Daishin Maru. The vessel measures 42.6 meters in length, 11.5 meters in breadth, and 3.0 meters in depth, with the forward section of the car deck converted into tourist accommodations to increase passenger capacity. She was re-engined and later sold to a company in Palawan in 2017.	
Lite Ferry 20		Formerly the LCT St. Mark, the vessel has been renamed LCT San Ricardo under San Ricardo Shipping Lines, serving the Lipata–San Ricardo route.	
Lite Ferry 3		The vessel was acquired in 2006 as the former Noumi No. 8 in Japan and later became the second Santiago de Bohol in the Lite Ferries fleet, noted as the smallest vessel in the fleet. On September 28, 2021, she capsized near Ormoc. The vessel was retrieved from Ormoc City Port and transported back to Cebu City for refitting and renovations. On August 31, 2024, she returned under a new name and ownership, renamed M/V Blessed San Ricardo of ALD Sea Transport.	

== Ports of call and routes ==
=== Ports of call ===
Lite Ferries' main port of call is at the Port of Cebu City. Other ports of call are:

- Pulauan, Dapitan
- Dipolog
- Larena, Siquijor
- Mandaue
- Ormoc
- Naval, Biliran
- Plaridel, Misamis Occidental
- Samboan
- Oslob, Cebu
- San Carlos, Negros Occidental
- Sibulan, Negros Oriental
- Tagbilaran
- Toledo, Cebu
- Cagayan de Oro
- Jagna, Bohol
- Tubigon, Bohol
- Dumaguete
- Nasipit, Agusan del Norte
- Bogo, Cebu
- Calbayog
- Lipata, Surigao del Norte
- San Juan, Southern Leyte
- Matnog, Sorsogon
- Daanbantayan, Cebu
- Batangas
- Caticlan, Malay, Aklan
- Ajuy, Iloilo (soon)
- Concepcion, Iloilo (soon)
- Manapla, Negros Occidental (soon)

=== Routes ===
At present, these are the routes (and vice versa) served by Lite Ferries:

- Cebu - Cagayan de Oro
- Cebu - Calbayog (via Bogo)
- Cebu - Dapitan
- Cebu - Naval, Biliran Province
- Cebu - Ormoc
- Cebu - Larena (via Tagbilaran)
- Cebu - Plaridel (via Tagbilaran and Larena)
- Cebu - Tagbilaran
- Cebu - Tubigon
- Toledo - San Carlos
- Mandaue - Tubigon
- Mandaue - Ormoc
- Tagbilaran - Larena
- Tagbilaran - Argao
- Tagbilaran - Plaridel
- Tagbilaran - Cagayan de Oro
- Samboan - Dapitan
- Bato (Samboan, Cebu) - Sibulan
- Jagna - Cagayan de Oro
- Jagna - Nasipit
- Plaridel - Larena
- Oslob, Cebu - Dipolog
- Oslob, Cebu - Dumaguete - Dipolog/Dapitan
- Cebu - Tagbilaran - Larena, Siquijor - Dumaguete
- Dumaguete - Tagbilaran
- Lipata - Cabalian
- Lipata - Liloan
- Bogo - Matnog, Sorsogon
- Daanbantayan, Cebu - Matnog, Sorsogon
- Batangas - Caticlan
- Ajuy - Manapla (soon)
- Concepcion - Manapla (soon)

== Incidents and accidents ==
- On August 28, 2019, M/V Lite Ferry 16 caught fire near the engine room at Tag-ulo Point, about 3 kilometers off Pulauan Port in Dapitan with at least 4 passengers dead.
- On December 16, 2021, M/V Lite Ferry 10 capsized in the vicinity of Loon, Bohol caused by the strong winds of Typhoon Odette, the captain died but all crew members survived.
- On September 28, 2021, M/V Lite Ferry 3 capsized in the vicinity of Ormoc. All crew survived but one lady died.
- On October 29, 2022, M/V Lite Ferry 1 ran aground in Port of Jagna due to the strong winds of Typhoon Paeng. All crew and passengers are safe.
- On December 16, 2021, M/V Lite Ferry 18 capsized in the vicinity of Balamban, Cebu Shipyard by leading a strong winds of Typhoon Rai, all crew are safe.
- On April 19, 2025, M/V Lite Ferry Five ran aground in shallow waters near Jagna Port, Bohol while maneuvering to depart for Cagayan de Oro. Fortunately, all 506 passengers and an unspecified amount of crew were reported safe, with no injuries. The incident occurred approximately 200 meters from the port. All passengers were rescued in a joint effort by the Philippine Coast Guard and local responders. Initial inspections indicate no major hull damage.

== Sister companies ==
These are the sister companies of Lite Shipping:

- Danilo Lines Incorporated
- Sunline Shipping Corporation
- Lirio Shipping Lines Incorporated
- FAL Shipping Corporation
- Cebu Lite Trading Inc.
- Manila Heavy Equipment Corporation
- Soledad Suites
- Brewpoint Coffee Club
- Casa Felomina
- Pamilacan Island Paradise
- Bohol Yacht Club, Inc.
- Bohol Community Cable TV Systems, Inc.
- Bohol Pensioners Financing Corporation
- Next Models Management Inc.
- Lite Properties Corporation

== See also ==
- Montenegro Lines
- Trans-Asia Shipping Lines
- Roble Shipping Inc.
- Aleson Shipping Lines
- Official website
