= Port of Dapitan =

Port in the Philippines

Port of Dapitan Pulauan Port
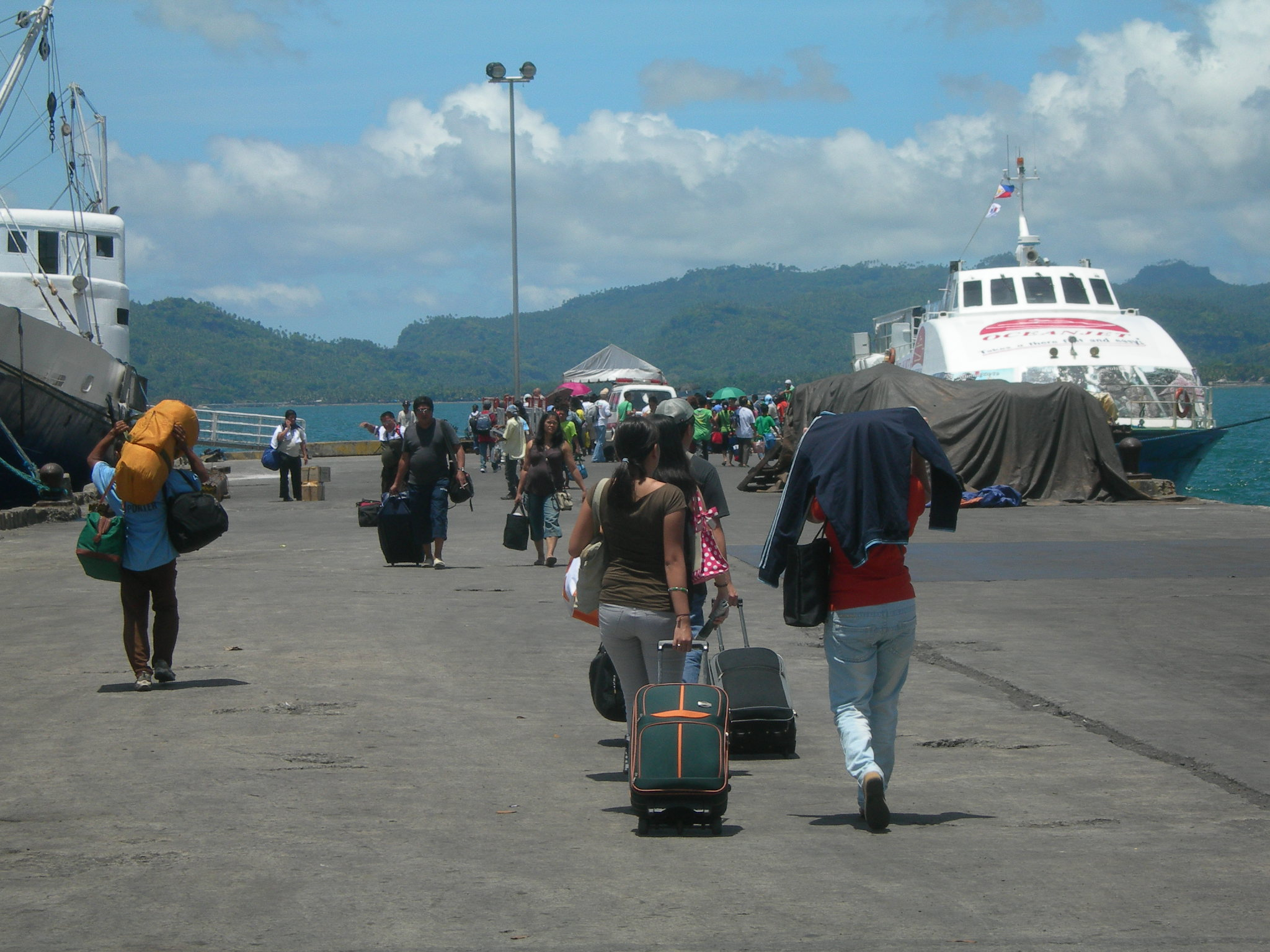
- Interactive map of Port of Dapitan; Pulauan Port
- Location in Mindanao#Philippines Port of Dapitan; Pulauan Port (Philippines)

Location
- Country: Philippines
- Location: Dapitan, Philippines
- Coordinates: 8°38′10″N 123°22′55″E

Details
- Opened: 1977
- Operated by: Port Management Office Zamboanga del Norte
- Owned by: Philippine Ports Authority
- Type of harbour: Natural/Artificial
- No. of berths: 7
- No. of wharfs: 3

Statistics
- Passenger traffic: 866,306 (2019)
- Website https://www.ppa.com.ph/ http://pmozamboangadelnorte.com/

The Port of Dapitan, locally and originally known as Pulauan Port (Filipino: Daungan ng Pulauan, Cebuano: Pantalan sa Pulauan), is a seaport in Dapitan, Philippines. It is owned and managed by Philippine Ports Authority and is the baseport of the Port Management Office Zamboanga del Norte.

== History ==
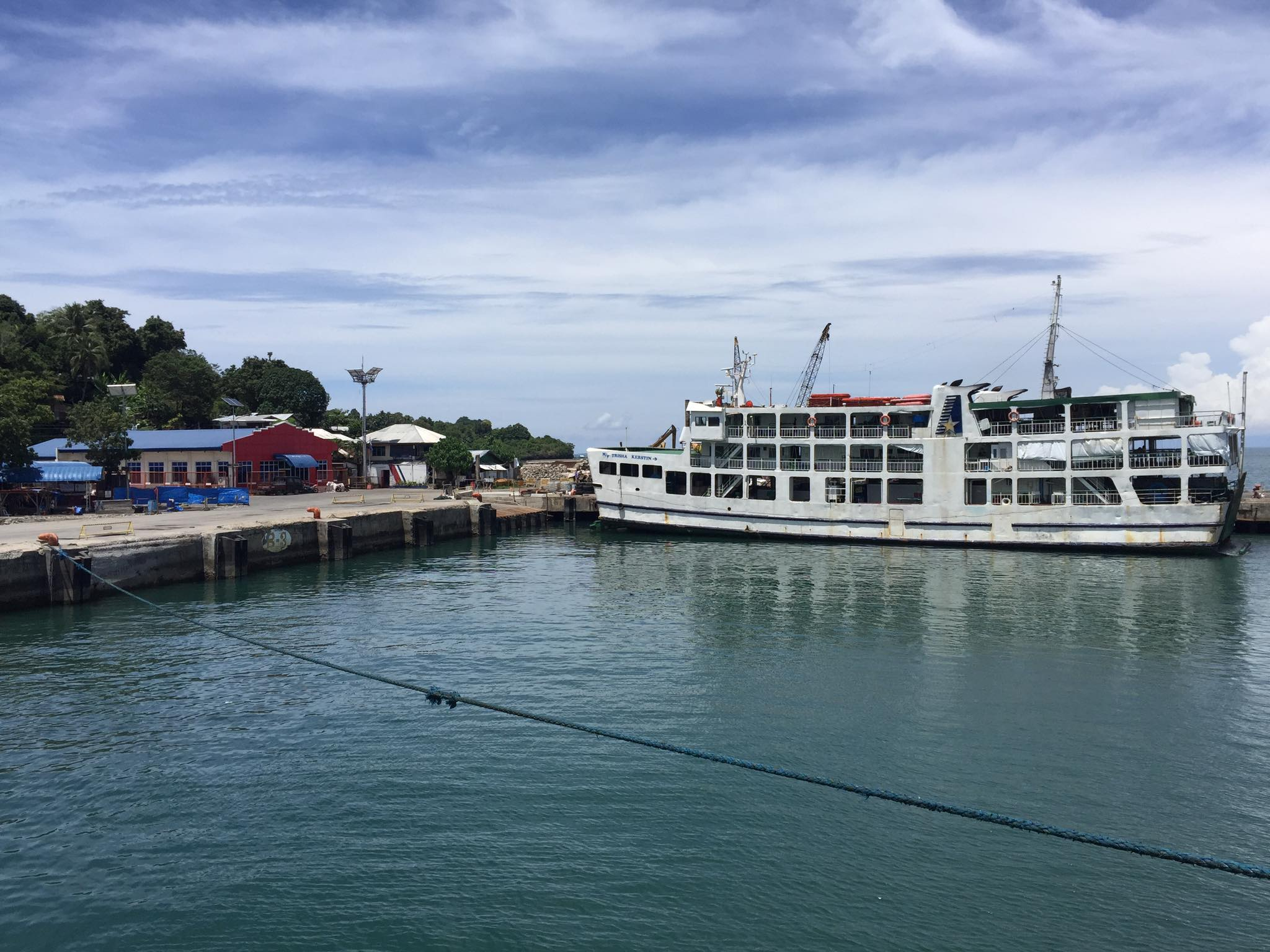
MV Trisha Kerstin 3 of Aleson Shipping Lines docked at Port of Dapitan.

The Port of Dapitan started as one of the sub-ports of the Port Management Unit (PMU) of Zamboanga in 1977, at the time when the Philippine Ports Authority (PPA) took over the port operations, development, and management from the Bureau of Customs. As the port was originally known as Pulauan Port, the Local Government of Dapitan through their Sangguniang Bayan passed Resolution No. 26-1999 renaming the port as Port of Dapitan. It would later be reclassified as Terminal Management Office of Dapitan (TMO-Dapitan) under the Port Management Office of Zamboanga (PMO-Zamboanga), Port District Office of Southern Mindanao (PDO-Southern Mindanao).

TMO-Dapitan's administrative jurisdiction was transferred to the Port Management Office of Ozamiz (PMO-Ozamiz) under the Port District Office of Northern Mindanao (PDO-Northern Mindanao) in 1995. In 2008, TMO-Dapitan was reclassified as Port Management Office of Dapitan (PMO-Dapitan), but at that time had no terminal port under its jurisdiction. In 2009, the jurisdiction of ten government ports and two private ports were transferred to PMO-Dapitan from PMO-Ozamiz; and PMO-Dapitan was transferred back to PDO-Southern Mindanao.

== Statistics ==
Passenger Statistics
Year	Total	Disembarking	Embarking	Ref.
2015	772,617	392,608	380,009	
2016	867,474	450,352	417,122	
2017	903,754	489,298	414,456	
2018	932,613	517,747	414,866	
2019	866,306	465,528	400,778	

== Incidents ==
- On the early morning of August 28, 2019, M/V Lite Ferry 16 of Lite Shipping Corporation caught fire near the engine room at Tag-ulo Point, about 3 kilometers off Pulauan Port with at least 4 passengers dead.

== See also ==
- List of ports in the Philippines
- Dapitan
