= Roble Shipping =

Shipping company based in Cebu City, Philippines

Roble Shipping Inc.
- Type: Private
- Industry: Shipping
- Founded: February 20, 1985; 41 years ago
- Founder: Jose L. Roble
- Headquarters: North Reclamation Area, Cebu City, Philippines
- Area served: Philippines
- Key people: Joy Roble (President and CEO)
- Services: Passenger and cargo transport
- Total assets: ₱100 million
- Website: http://www.robleshipping.com/

Roble Shipping Inc. is a Cebu-based shipping line located in Cebu City, Philippines. The company was founded by Jose Roble, a native of Danao, Cebu.

== History ==
Established on February 20, 1985, it started with a small cargo vessel called MV Marao plying from Cebu to Iloilo containing rice and mixed cargo materials. Roble Shipping Inc. is now one of the major players in the Leyte and Samar routes. The shipping line has seven-passenger vessels of which five are roll-on/roll-off vessels, ten cargo vessels and four barges and tugboats.

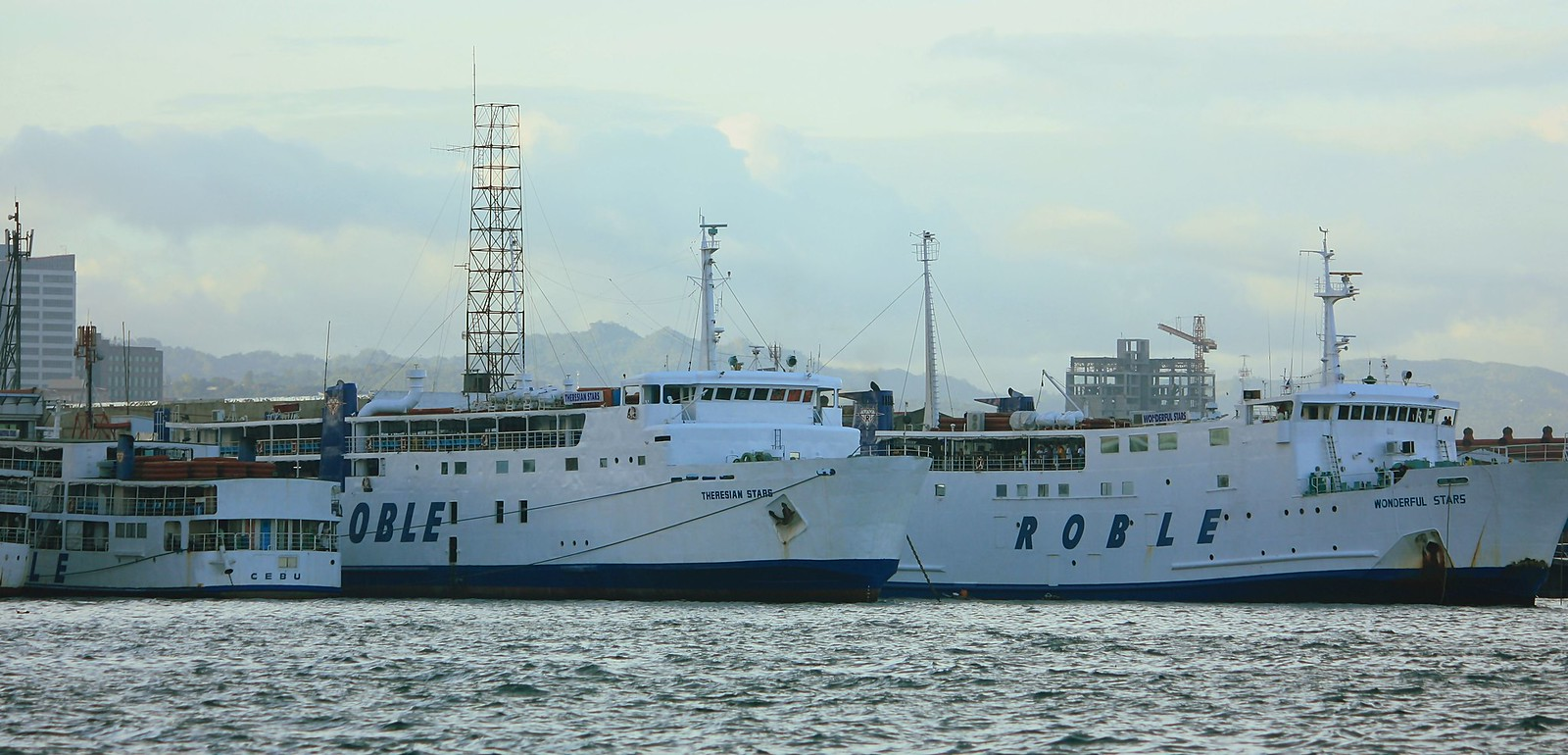
Roble Shipping Vessels

The founder and owner of Roble Shipping Inc., Jose L. Roble, Passed away on September 11, 2009, at the Cebu Doctors' University Hospital at the age of 62. All of his sons and daughters now play important roles in steering the company.

The Duranos also helped in the early years in establishing the company.

In 2010, Roble Shipping Inc. moved all its operations to their new headquarters in Pier 7.

== Fleet ==
=== Current fleet ===
Roble Shipping's sea-worthy fleet consists of 8 RORO/ROPAX vessels, 2 LCTs and 8 cargo ships, including its sister company, Star Philippines Shipping Lines.

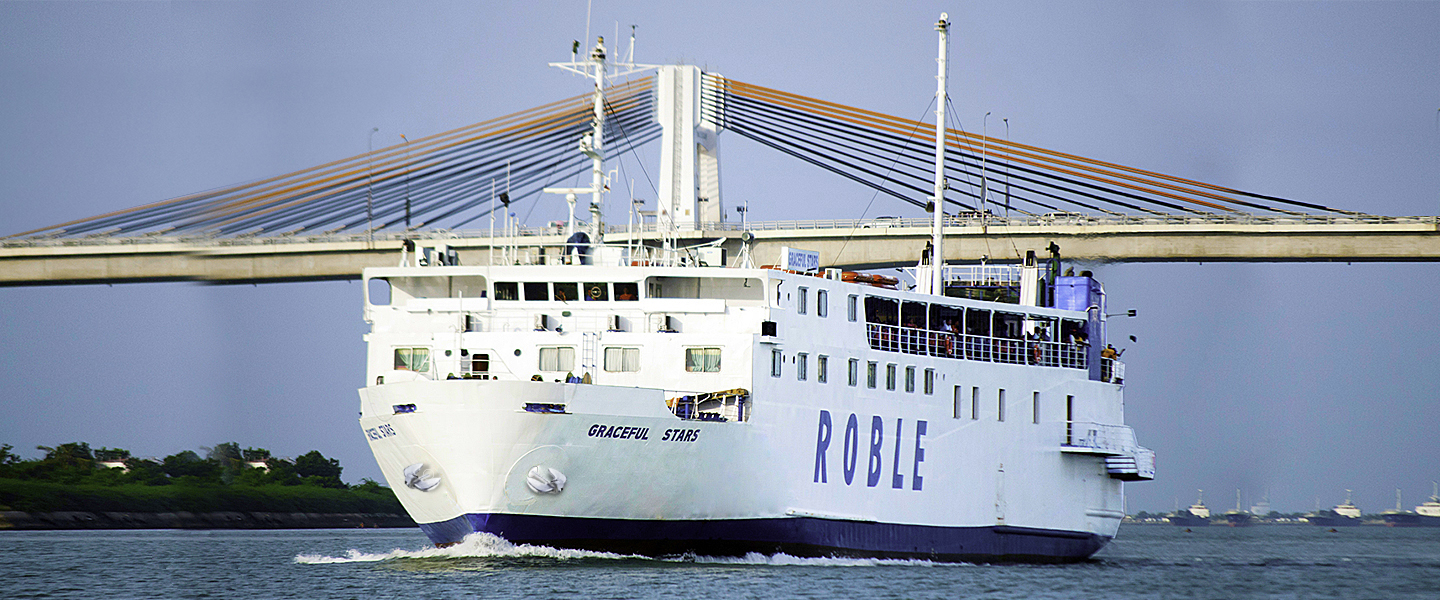
Roble Shipping Graceful Stars

Roll-On Roll-Off vessels

- MV Immaculate Stars
- MV MOTHER IMMACULATE STARS
- MV Theresian Stars
- MV Joyful Stars
- MV Ocean Stars (formerly Blessed Stars)
- MV Beautiful Stars
- MV Graceful Stars

LCT / Landing Craft Tank

- MV LCT Stars
- MV LCT Stars II

Cargo Ships

- MV Star Zamboanga
- MV Star Ormoc
- MV Star Hilongos
- MV Star Ozamis
- MV Star Danao
- MV Star Davao
- MV Star Iligan
- MV Star Dinagat

=== Historical fleet ===
Passenger Vessels

- MV Marao
- MV Heaven Star
- MV Ormoc Star
- MV Oroquieta Stars
- MV Guada Cristy
- MV Cebu Diamond
- MV Wonderful Stars (2007-2015)
- MV Wonderful Stars (2005-2005)
- MV Sacred Stars
- MV Blessed Stars
- MV Hilongos Diamond
- MV Jacqueline Star
- MV Star Sabang
- MV Twinkle Little Stars
- MV Claudine Stars

High-speed craft

- MV Superjoy (Used only during the Fluvial Procession of Señor Santo Niño de Cebú at the Sinulog Festival)

=== Future fleet ===
- MV Glorious Stars (For Star Philippines, formerly named Wonderful Stars)
- MV Immaculate Conception Stars (for Star Philippines, formerly the MV Filipinas Dumaguete of Cokaliong Shipping Lines)
- MV Starlite Navigator (for Star Philippines)
- MV Blessed Mother Star (For Star Philippines And Former MV Jacqueline Star)

=== Star Philippines Shipping Lines ===
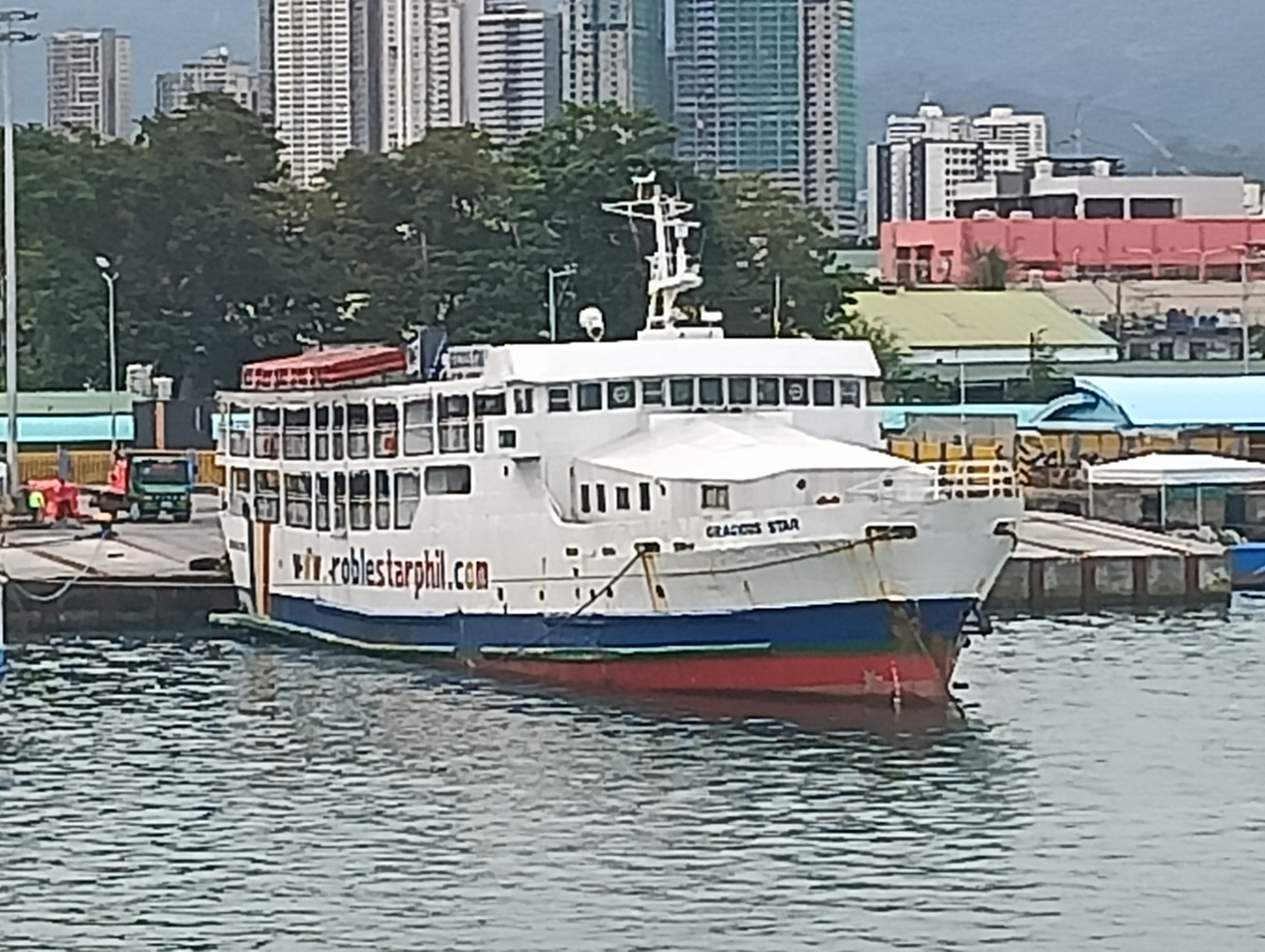
MV Gracious Stars

- MV Gracious Stars (formerly MV Sacred Stars and MV Filipinas Surigao of Cokaliong Shipping Lines)

== Ports of call and Routes ==
=== Ports of Call ===
Roble Shipping Inc. main port of call is Cebu City.

Current ports of call

- Ormoc City, Leyte
- Hilongos, Leyte
- Baybay City, Leyte
- Naval, Biliran

Former ports of call

- Oroquieta City
- Catbalogan, Samar
- Tacloban City, Leyte

=== Routes ===
- Cebu-Ormoc: MV Immaculate Stars
- Cebu-Hilongos: MV Theresian Stars / MV Joyful Stars
- Cebu-Baybay:MV Graceful Stars / MV Gracious Star
- Cebu-Naval, Biliran: MV Gracious Star
- standby: MV Beautiful Stars

== Incidents ==
- M/V Hilongos Diamond sunk within the Bato, Leyte Port
- On January 3, 2008, The MV Heaven Star of the Roble Shipping Lines left Ormoc City about 11 a.m. and was scheduled to arrive in Cebu City port at 3 pm. The vessel stopped off Isabel town in Leyte at noon. The vessel suffered a mechanical problem after seawater got into its bunker fuel. The company's other vessel M/V Wonderful Stars followed up to M/V Heaven Star's location to tow it.
- On June 29, 2008, MV Wonderful Star collided with a foreign-owned cargo vessel MCC Sulo at 1:20 am. Saturday around 4.5 nautical miles (8.3 km) from Liloan town, some 19 kilometers north of Cebu City. The MV Wonderful Star's port side (left side) catwalk railings were slightly damaged while MCC Sulo's starboard (right) bow had a slight scratch.
- On December 2, 2009 - M/V Wonderful Stars had a collision with a passenger-cargo vessel M/V Subic Bay 1 of the late Carlos A. Gothong Lines. The said vessel had gone sideways and sustained damages estimated to be within P600,000 to P700,000.
- On August 15, 2015, MV Wonderful Stars caught fire in the port of Ormoc City. No casualties were reported
- On June 2, 2021, LCT Jacqueline Star half-submerged due to onslaught of Tropical Storm Dante in Albuera, Leyte. No casualties reported
- On December 16, 2021, MV Oroquieta Stars capsized near Liloan, Cebu during the onslaught of Typhoon Rai.
- On January 15, 2024, MV Star Sabang capsized in Bayangan Island, Labason, Zamboanga del Norte while sailing from Cebu City bound to Zamboanga City onboard 13 crews and loaded 20,000 sacks of cement.
- On March 15, 2024, M/V Immaculate Stars, Collided with the M/V Doña Caroline Joy of Gothong Southern. Both ships suffered damages.
- In April 2025, an out of control barge, collided with the M/V Claudine Stars, causing it to capsize in Pier 7, Mandaue.
- On November 17, 2025, at around 8:21 PM, MV Star Zamboanga reportedly lost steering control and collided with the outbound MV Filipinas Dapitan of Cokaliong Shipping Lines near the Ouano Wharf–Opon Wharf area in Cebu; both vessels sustained minor damage and were confirmed safe.

== See also ==
- List of shipping companies in the Philippines
- 2GO Travel
- Montenegro Lines
- Aleson Shipping Lines
- Weesam Express
- Supercat Fast Ferry Corporation
- Trans-Asia Shipping Lines
