= Hankyu (disambiguation) =

Hankyu may refer to:

- Hankyu Corporation, a railway operator
- Hankyu Department Store
- Hankyu Braves, predecessors of Orix Buffaloes professional baseball team
- Hankyū (半弓), a type of Yumi
- Hankyu Ferry, a Japanese ferry company
