= Tokyo-Wan Ferry =

Japanese car ferry operator

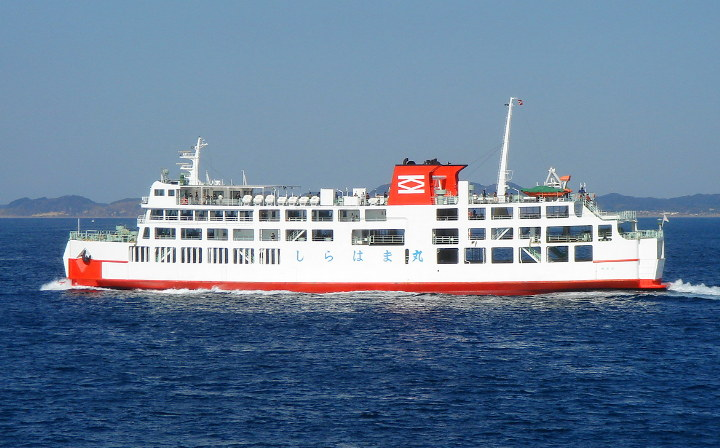
Shirahama-maru

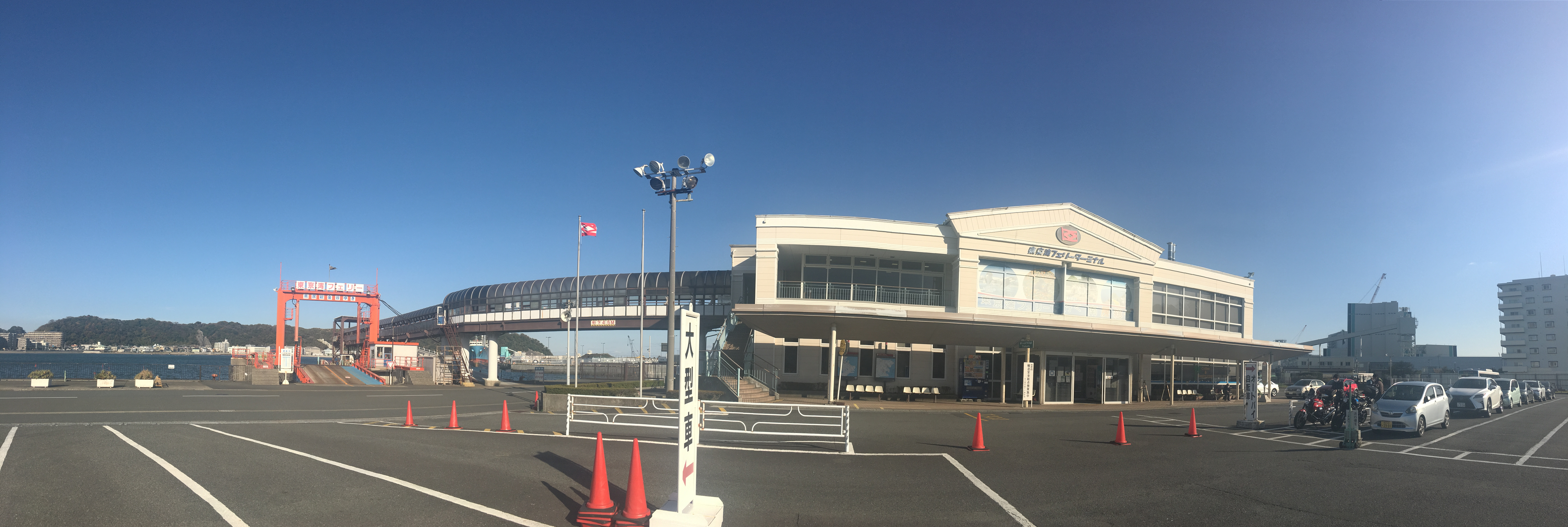
The ferry terminal at the Port of Kurihama, Yokosuka.

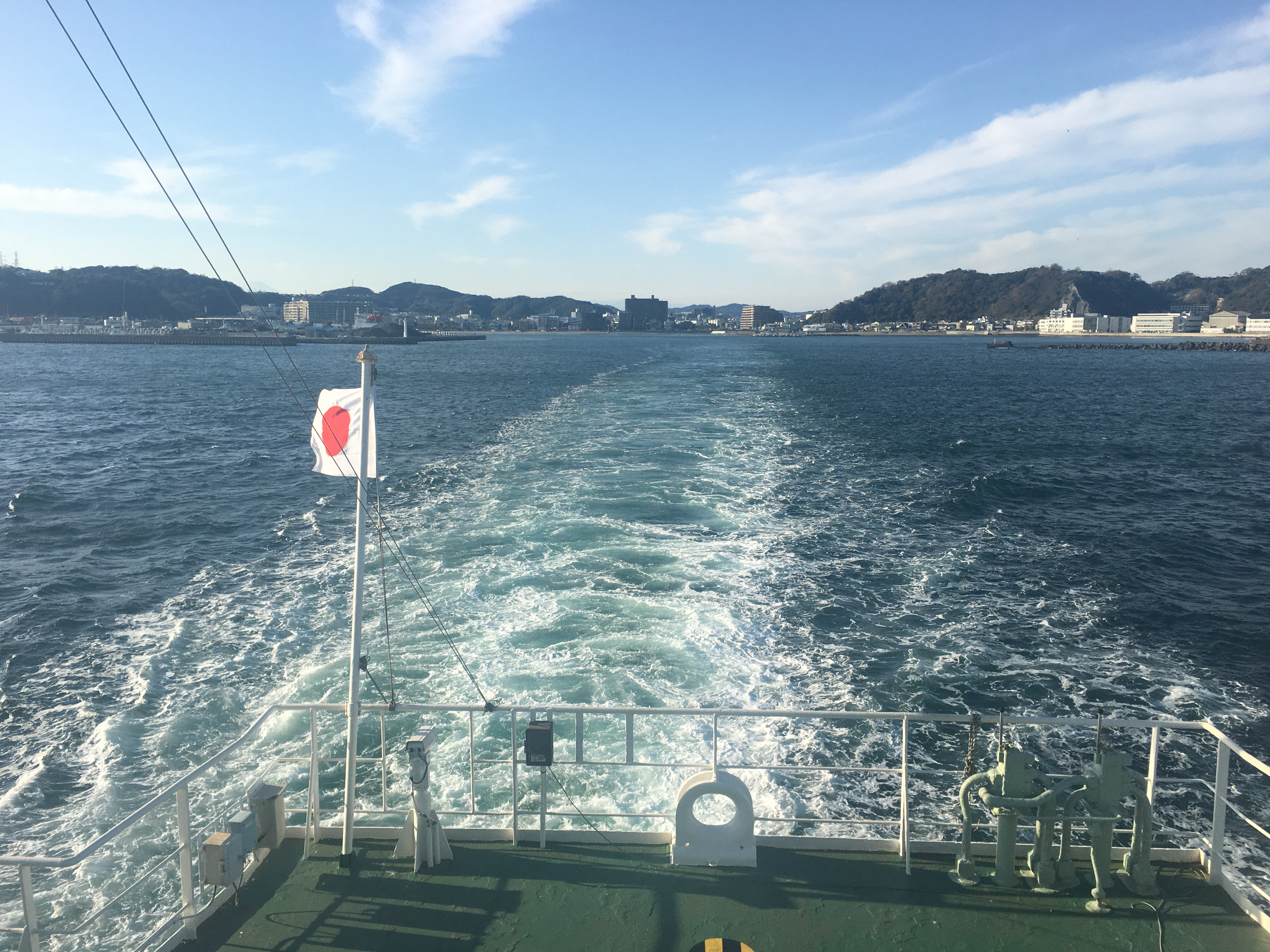
From the deck of a ferry.

Tokyo-Wan Ferry (東京湾フェリー, Tōkyō-Wan Ferī; "Tokyo Bay Ferry") is a Japanese car ferry operator. Its line links Yokosuka, Kanagawa and Futtsu, Chiba, across Tokyo Bay in 40 minutes. Headquartered in Yokosuka, the company started its service in 1957. In 1960, this company became an affiliated company of Keisei Electric Railway. In 1979 almost all of the shares owned by Keisei were transferred to Tokyo Kisen. The ferry started to accept PASMO smart cards in June 2008.

At the Port of Kanaya, connection tickets to Keihin Electric Express Railway (Keikyū) Lines can be purchased. The single tickets allow passengers to be able to use a ferry lane, a bus route, and railway lines from Kanaya port to any station excluding Sengakuji Station on the Keikyu Line without purchasing tickets multiple times.

== Line ==
- Port of Kurihama (Port of Yokosuka, Yokosuka, Kanagawa) — Port of Kanaya (Futtsu, Chiba)

There is 1 service per 30 to 50 minutes, depending on the season.

== Terminals ==
Yokosuka (west) side: 35.220666°N 139.715020°E

Chiba (east) side: 35.169395°N 139.817559°E

Another cross-bay ferry route, running between Yokohama and Kisarazu, was shut down when the Tokyo Bay Aqua-Line bridge tunnel linking the same locations opened in December 1997.

== Tickets ==
- A connecting ticket can be used on the Tokyo-Wan Ferry from Kanaya Port through Kurihama Port. It enables passengers to go to Keikyu Kurihama Station by transferring onto Keihin Kyuko Bus at Kurihama Port. Passengers can use trains from Keikyu Kurihama Station to any station which belongs to Keikyū Electric Railway.
- When passengers are available on Tokyo Wan Ferry Round-trip Ticket, everyone can use trains between any station excluding Sengakuji Station on Keikyū Electric Railway and Keikyu Kurihama Station just one time. And, you can use a round-trip between Kurihama Port and Hamakanaya Port on Tokyo-Wan Ferry just one time.

== Ships ==
| Name | Gross tonnage | Speed | Passenger capacity | In service from |
|---|---|---|---|---|
| Kanaya-maru | 3,580 t | 24 km/h 15 mph | 580 | April 1992 |
| Shirahama-maru | 3,260 t | 24 km/h 15 mph | 580 | December 1989 |
| Kurihama-maru | 2.759 t | 24 km/h 15 mph | 570 | July 1986 |

== See also ==
- List of ferry operators in Japan
