= MV Bni Nsar =

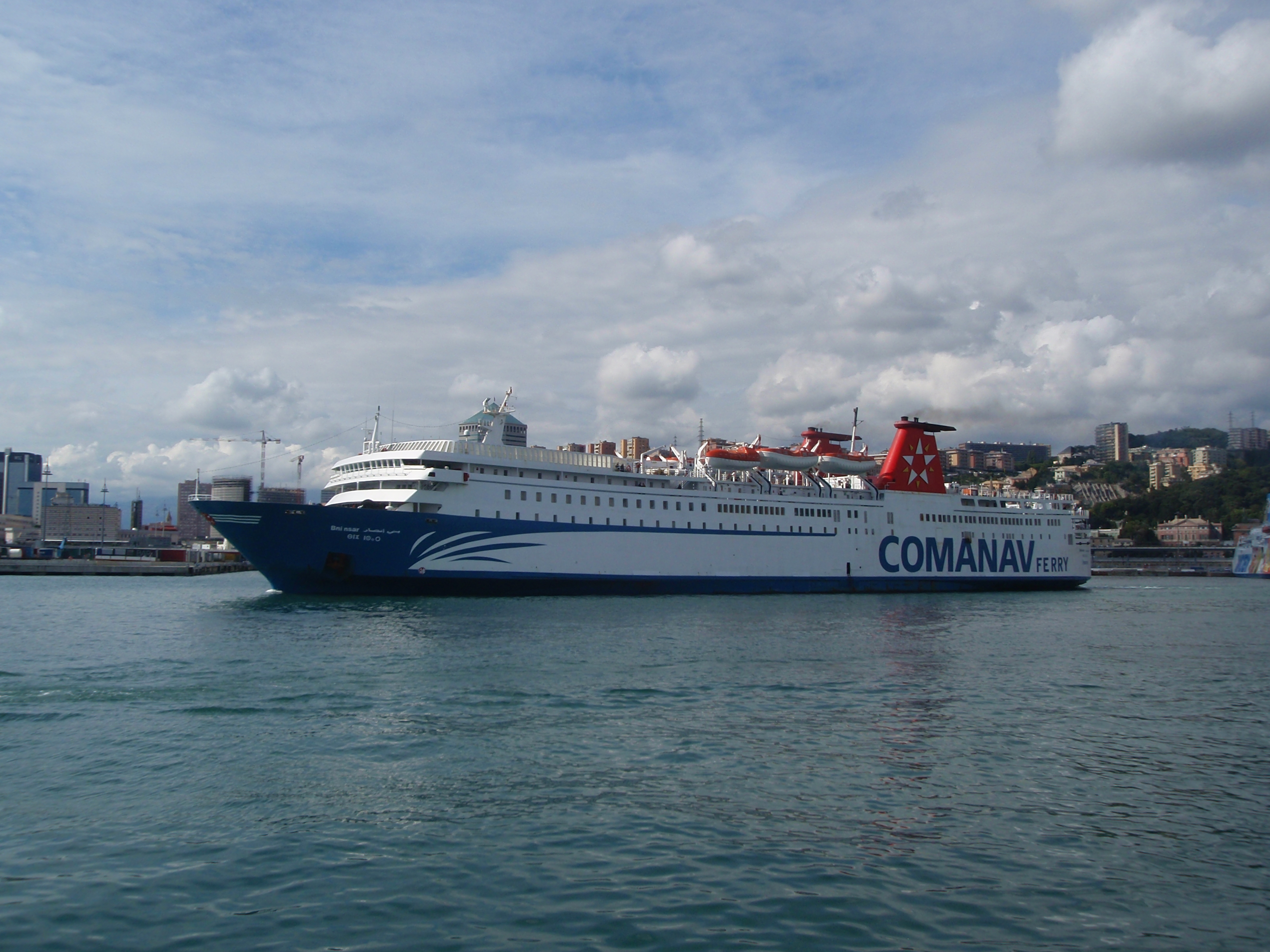
- MV Bni Nsar leave Genoa harbour

History

Japan
- Name: Akashi
- Owner: Hankyu Ferry
- Port of registry: Japan
- Builder: Kanda Shipbuilding, Kure
- Launched: 28 August 1972
- Completed: 21 November 1972
- Decommissioned: 1991
- Identification: IMO number: 7236335
- Fate: Sold to Marlines, 1991

Greece
- Name: Dame M
- Owner: Marlines
- Port of registry: Greece
- Route: Ancone - Patras
- Acquired: 1991
- Out of service: 1999
- Fate: Sold to Comanav, 1999

Morocco
- Name: Marrakech Express
- Owner: Comanav
- Port of registry: Morocco
- Acquired: 1999
- Fate: Sold

Panama
- Name: Bni Nsar
- Owner: Comanav
- Port of registry: Panama, Panama
- Acquired: 1999
- Fate: Scrapped 2014

General characteristics
- Tonnage: 14,015 GT; 2,443 DWT
- Length: 160 m (520 ft)
- Beam: 22.9 m (75 ft)
- Depth: 5.4 m (18 ft)

MV Bni Nsar, (formerly MV Akashi, MV Dame M, MV Marrakech Express) was a ferry launched on 28 August 1972 in Japan. She was scrapped in 2014 under the name Sar.

== History ==
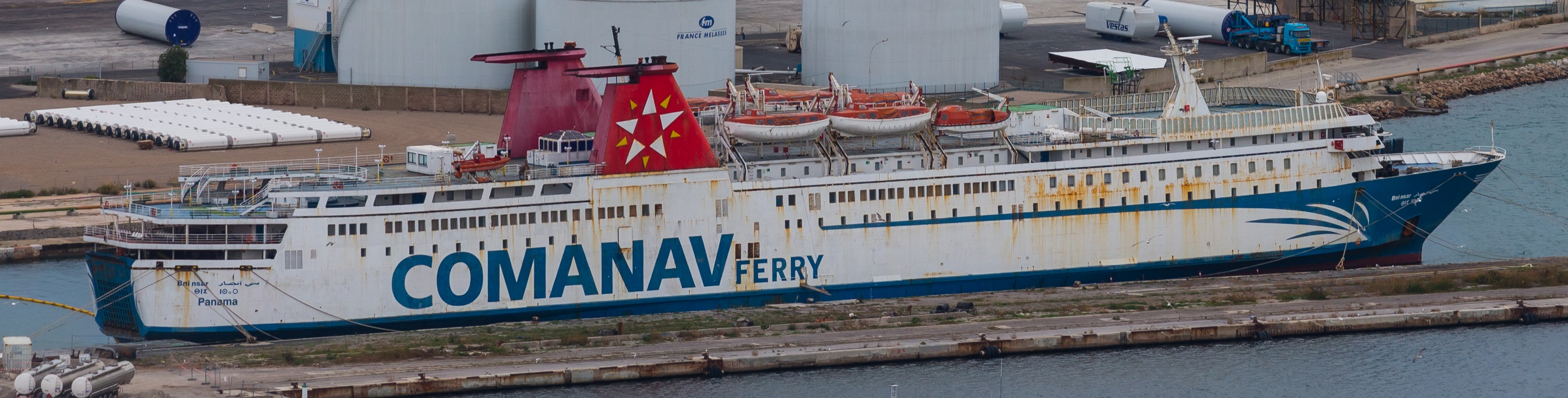
The MV Bni Nsar detained at Sète

The MV Bni Nsar was built in Japan in 1972. She was put in service under the name of MV Akashi. In 1991, she was sold to Greek owner Marlines. She was rebuilt at Perama under the name MV Dame M. When she re-entered service she was used between Ancona and Patras.

In 1996, she was operated by Comanav in Morocco and then was returned to Greece. In 1999, she was bought by Comanav and was renamed Salamis Star for service in Greece. In 2002, she was returned to Morocco operations, becoming Marrakech Express. She was operated on the Sète - Nador route.

In 2010, she was renamed Bni Nsar and flagged in Panama. In January 2013, she was detained with MV Biladi and MV Marrakech because Comarit et Comanav went bankrupt.

She was scrapped at Aliaga on 31 July 2014 under the name Sar.
