= List of ferry operators in Japan =

List of ferry operators in Japan lists car ferry operators in Japan. The list includes companies operating now. It also lists foreign operators that have international car ferry lines to Japan. English names might be tentative.

== International ==
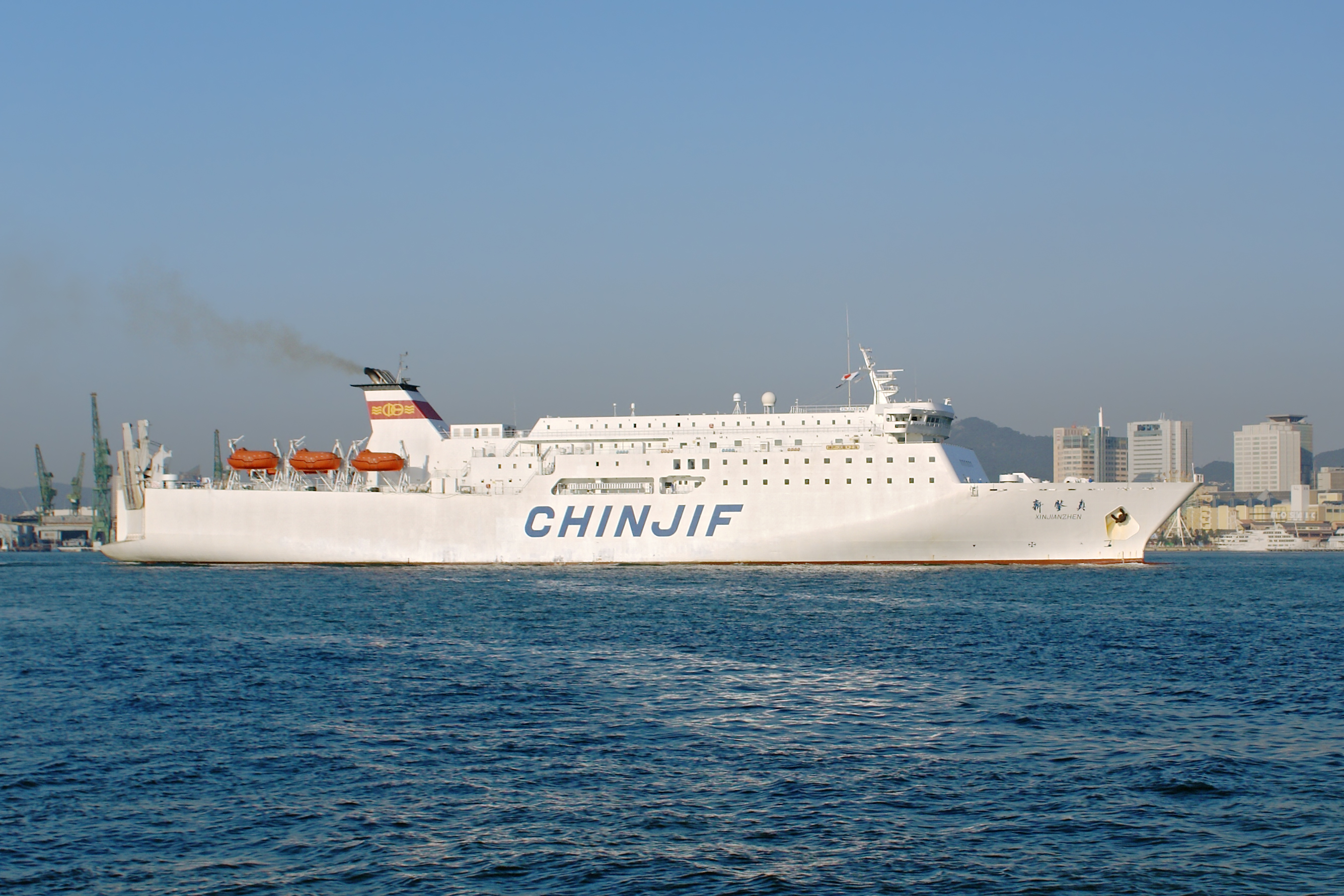
Xīnjiànzhēn of China Japan International Ferry at the Port of Kobe

=== China ===
- China Express Line 中国快航 (Yānjīng 燕京)
- China Japan International Ferry 中日国际轮渡 (Xīnjiànzhēn 新鉴真)
- Tianjin Jīn-Shén Ferry 天津津神客货轮船 (Yānjīng 燕京)

=== Japan ===
- Camellia Line カメリアライン
- Shanghai Ferry 上海フェリー
- SHK Line Group SHKライングループ
  - Kampu Ferry 関釜フェリー
  - Suzhou Shimonoseki Ferry 蘇州下関フェリー
  Freight only. Plans to operate a passenger service as well.

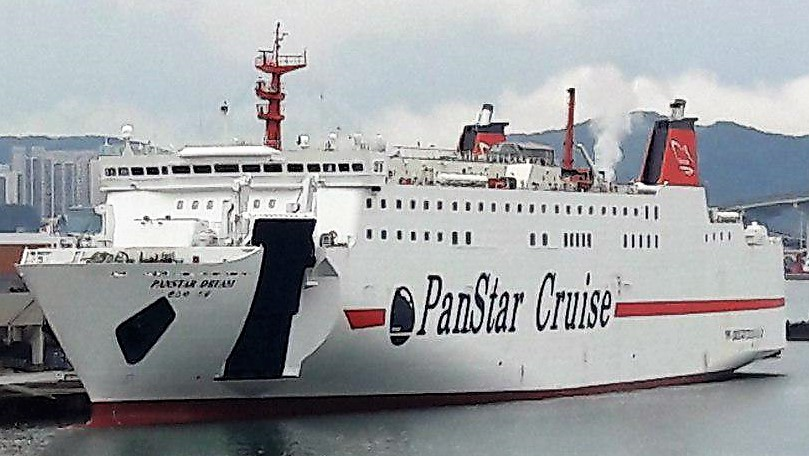
The PanStar Dream carries passengers and freight between Busan and Osaka and hosts weekend excursions from Busan.

=== Korea, South ===
- PanStar Ferry 팬스타페리
- Pukwan Ferry 부관페리

=== Russia ===
- Sakhalin Shipping Company (SASCO) Сахалинское морское пароходство

== Inter-regional ==
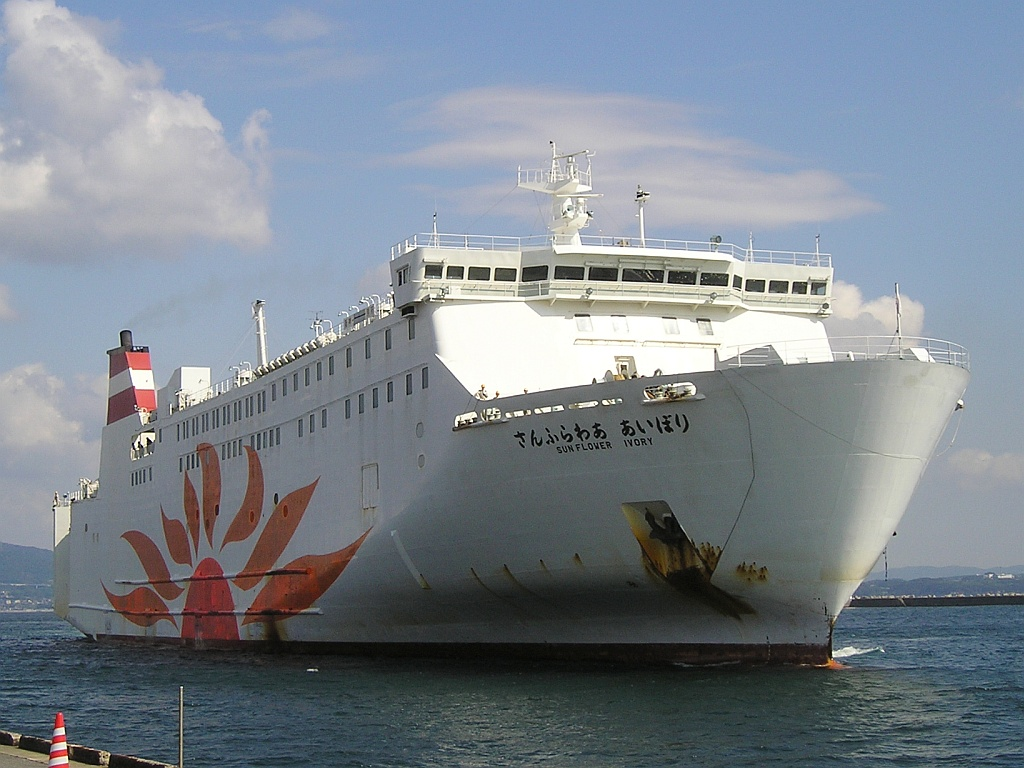
Sunflower Ivory of Kansai Kisen at the Port of Beppu

- A" Line マルエーフェリー
- Marix Line マリックスライン
- Miyazaki Car Ferry 宮崎カーフェリー
- MOL Group 商船三井グループ
  - MOL Sunflower 商船三井さんふらわあ
  - Meimon Taiyō Ferry 名門大洋フェリー
- SHK Line Group SHKライングループ
  - Hankyu Ferry 阪九フェリー
  - Shin Nihonkai Ferry 新日本海フェリー
  - Ocean Trans オーシャントランス
- Taiheiyō Ferry 太平洋フェリー

== Hokkaidō ==
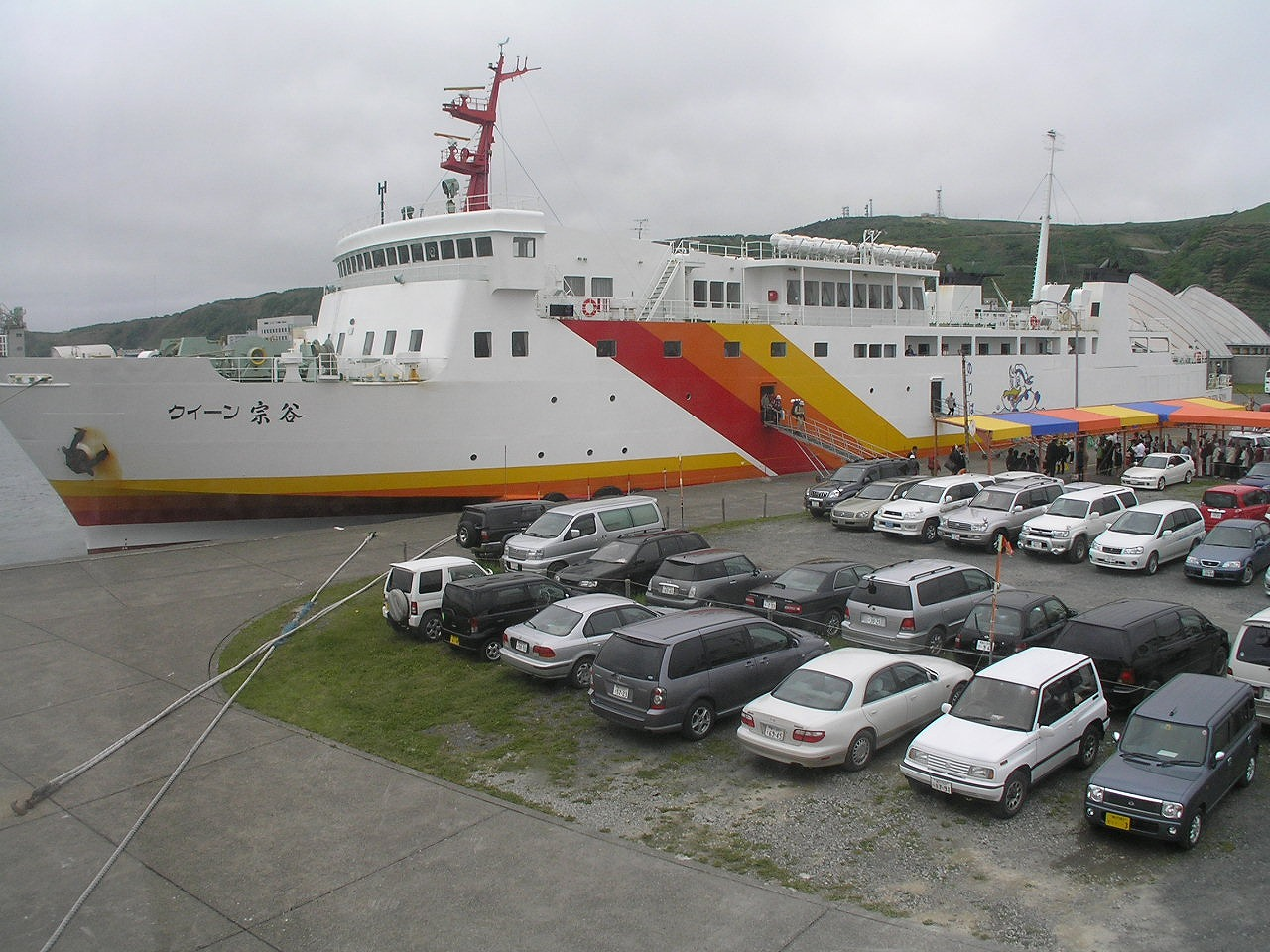
Queen Sōya of Higashi Nihonkai Ferry at the Port of Wakkanai

- Haboro Enkai Ferry 羽幌沿海フェリー
- Heart Land Ferry ハートランドフェリー

== Hokkaidō — Tōhoku ==
- Tsugaru Kaikyō Ferry 津軽海峡フェリー
- Kawasaki Kinkai Kisen 川崎近海汽船 (Silver Ferry シルバーフェリー)
- Kitanihon Kaiun 北日本海運 (Seikan Ferry 青函フェリー)
- Kyōei Unyu 共栄運輸 (Seikan Ferry 青函フェリー)

== Tōhoku region ==
- Ajishima Line 網地島ライン
- Mutsuwan Ferry むつ湾フェリー
- Ōshima Kisen 大島汽船

== Kantō region ==
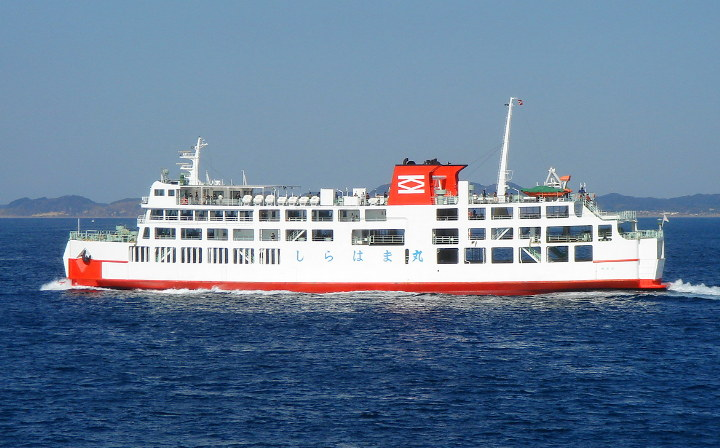
Shirahama-maru of Tōkyō-Wan Ferry

- Tōkyō-Wan Ferry 東京湾フェリー

== Chūbu region ==
- Isewan Ferry 伊勢湾フェリー
- Meitetsu Kaijō Kankōsen 名鉄海上観光船
- Sado Steam Ship 佐渡汽船
- S-Pulse Dream Ferry エスパルスドリームフェリー (Surugawan Ferry 駿河湾フェリー)

== Kansai region ==
- Nankai Ferry 南海フェリー

== Chūgoku region ==
- Oki Kisen 隠岐汽船

== Seto Inland Sea ==
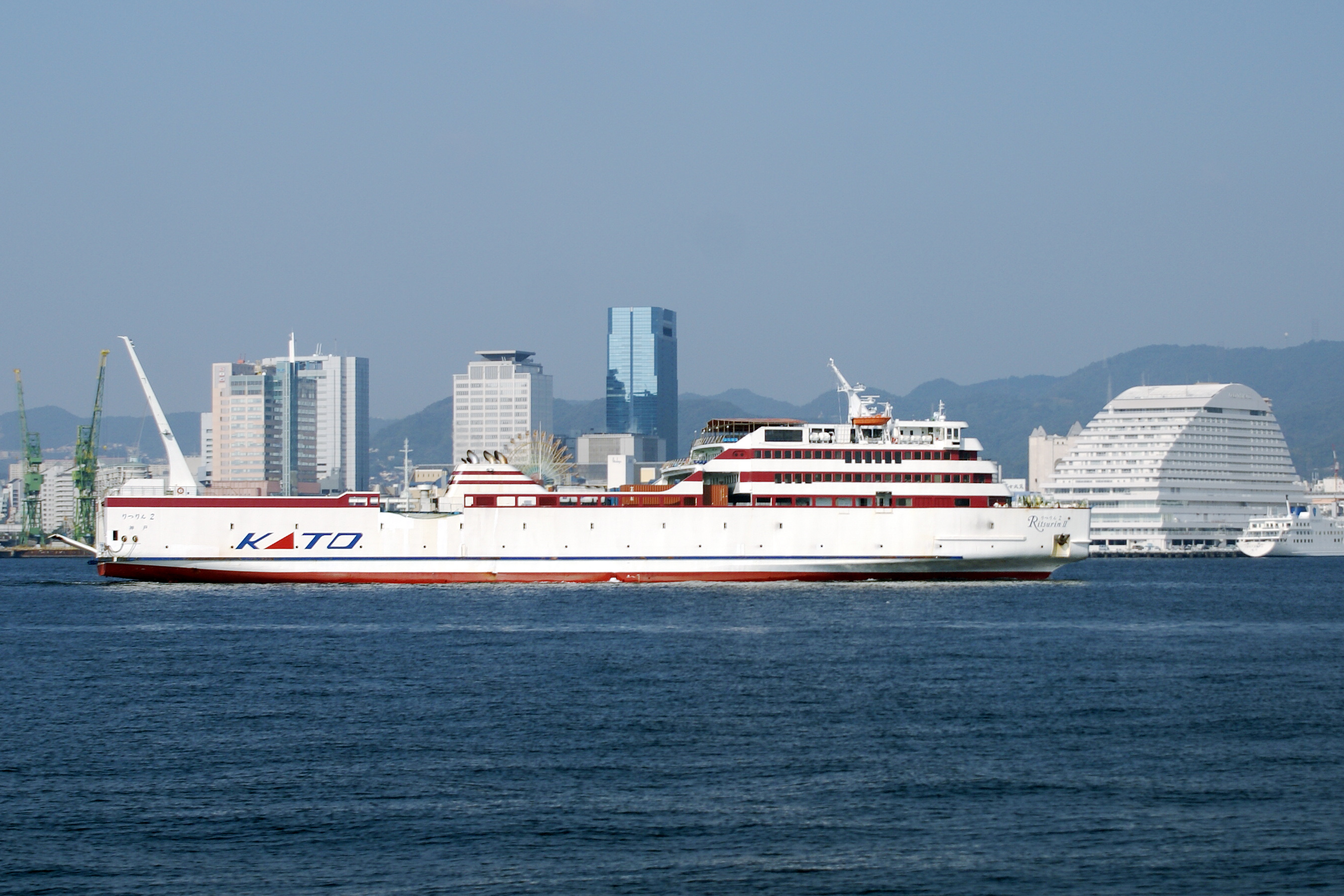
Ritsurin 2 of Jumbo Ferry at the Port of Kobe

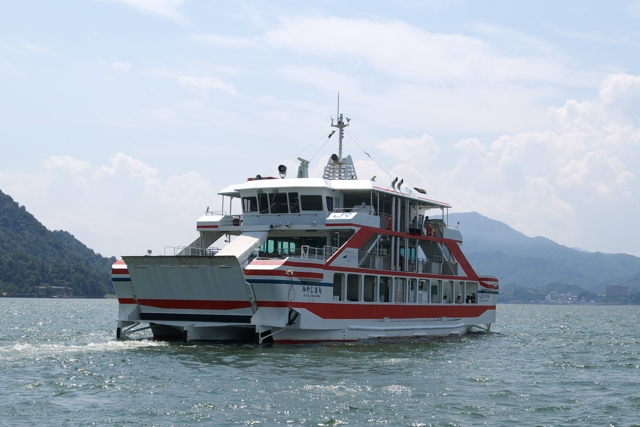
Miyajima-maru of JR Miyajima Ferry at Miyajima Pier

- Habu Shōsen 土生商船
- Ishizaki Kisen 石崎汽船
  - Nakajima Kisen 中島汽船
- Jumbo Ferry ジャンボフェリー
- Kyōwa Kisen 共和汽船
- Miyajima Matsudai Kisen 宮島松大汽船
- Ōmishima Ferry 大三島フェリー
- Ōsaki Kisen 大崎汽船
- Ryōbi Holdings 両備ホールディングス (Ryōbi Ferry 両備フェリー)
  - Kokusai Ferry 国際フェリー
  - Setouchi Kankō Kisen 瀬戸内観光汽船
- Sankō Kisen 三光汽船
- Setonaikai Kisen 瀬戸内海汽船
  - Akitsu Ferry 安芸津フェリー
  - Bōyo Kisen 防予汽船
  - Suō Ōshima Matsuyama Ferry 周防大島 松山フェリー
- Shikoku Ferry 四国フェリー
  - Shōdoshima Kyūkō Ferry 小豆島急行フェリー
- Shikoku Kaihatsu Ferry 四国開発フェリー (Shikoku Orange Ferry 四国オレンジフェリー)
- Shikoku Kisen 四国汽船
- Shimanami Ferry しまなみフェリー
- Shiyūjima Kaiun 雌雄島海運
- JR West Miyajima Ferry JR西日本宮島フェリー (JR Miyajima Ferry JR宮島航路)

== Chūgoku — Kyūshū ==
- Suōnada Ferry スオーナダフェリー

== Shikoku — Kyūshū ==
- Matsuyama Kokura Ferry 松山・小倉フェリー
- Kokudō Kyūshi Ferry 国道九四フェリー
- Kyūshi Orange Ferry 九四オレンジフェリー
- Sukumo Ferry 宿毛フェリー
- Uwajima Unyu 宇和島運輸

== Kyūshū region ==
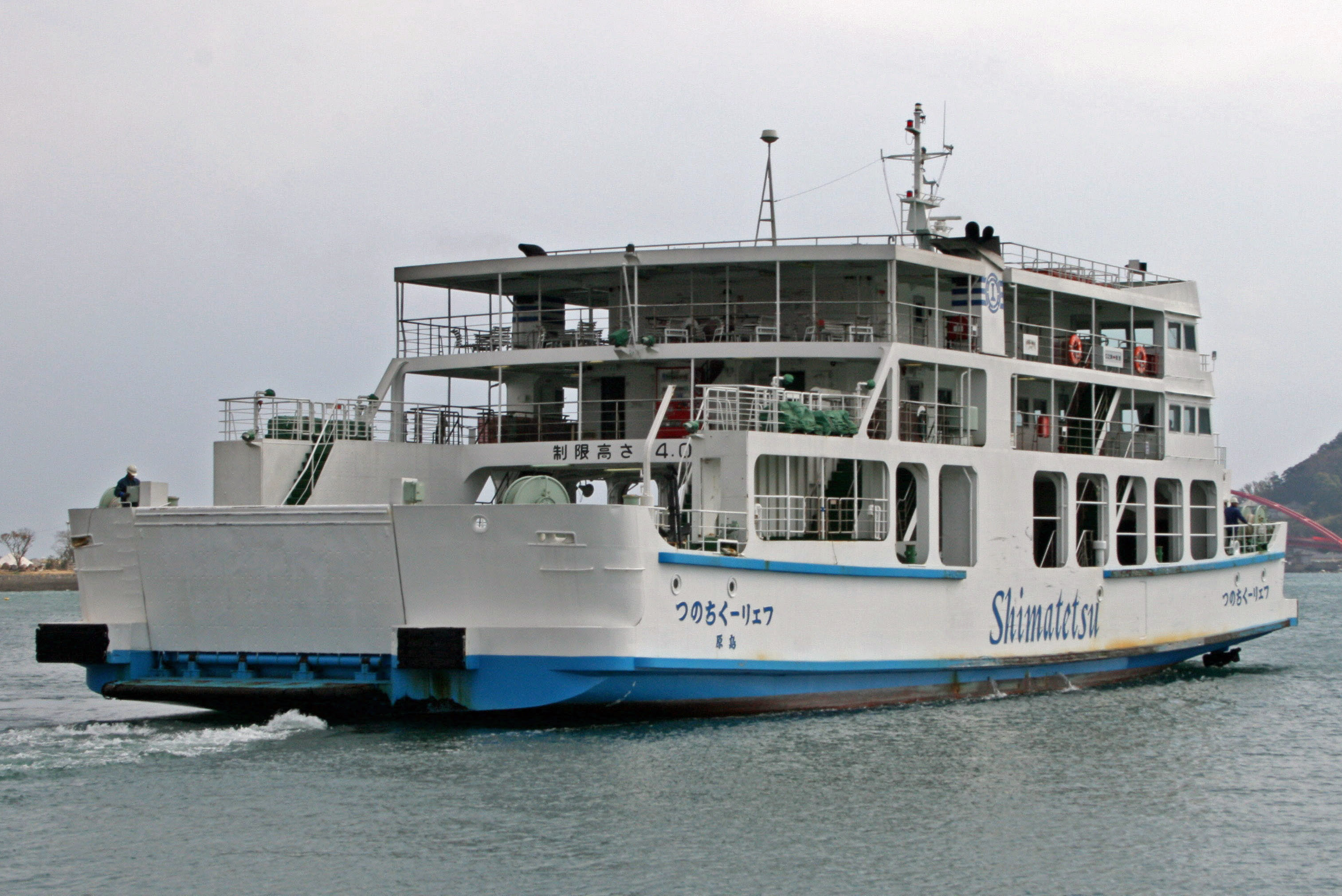
Shimatetsu Ferry at the Port of Kuchinotsu, Minamishimabara

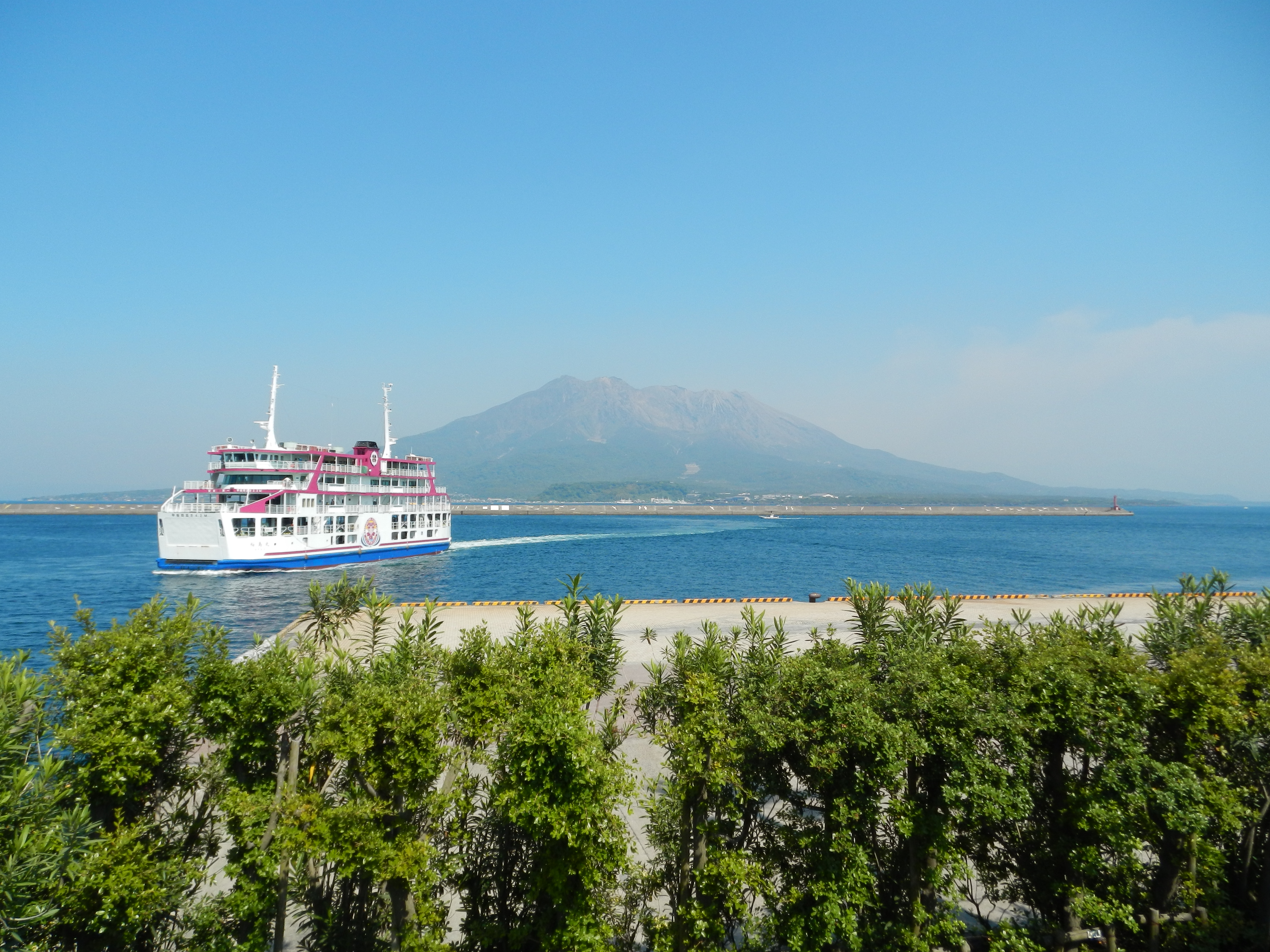
Sakurajima Ferry at the Port of Kagoshima

- Amami Kaiun 奄美海運
- Ariake Ferry 有明フェリー
- Cosmo Line コスモライン
- Iwasaki Group いわさきグループ
  - Kagoshima Shōsen 鹿児島商船
  - Kashō Kaiun 鹿商海運
  - Tarumi Ferry 垂水フェリー
- Kagoshima City Shipping Department 鹿児島市船舶局 (Sakurajima Ferry 桜島フェリー)
- Kumamoto Ferry 熊本フェリー
- Kyūshū Shōsen 九州商船
  - Koshikijima Shōsen 甑島商船
- Kyūshū Yūsen 九州郵船
- Mishima Village Ferry 三島村営 (Ferry Mishima フェリーみしま)
- Nomo Shōsen 野母商船
- Orita Kisen 折田汽船
- Setouchi Town Ferry 瀬戸内町営 (Ferry Kakeroma フェリーかけろま)
- Shimabara Railway 島原鉄道 (Shimatetsu Ferry 島鉄フェリー)
- Toshima Village Ferry 十島村営 (Ferry Toshima フェリーとしま)

=== Okinawa ===
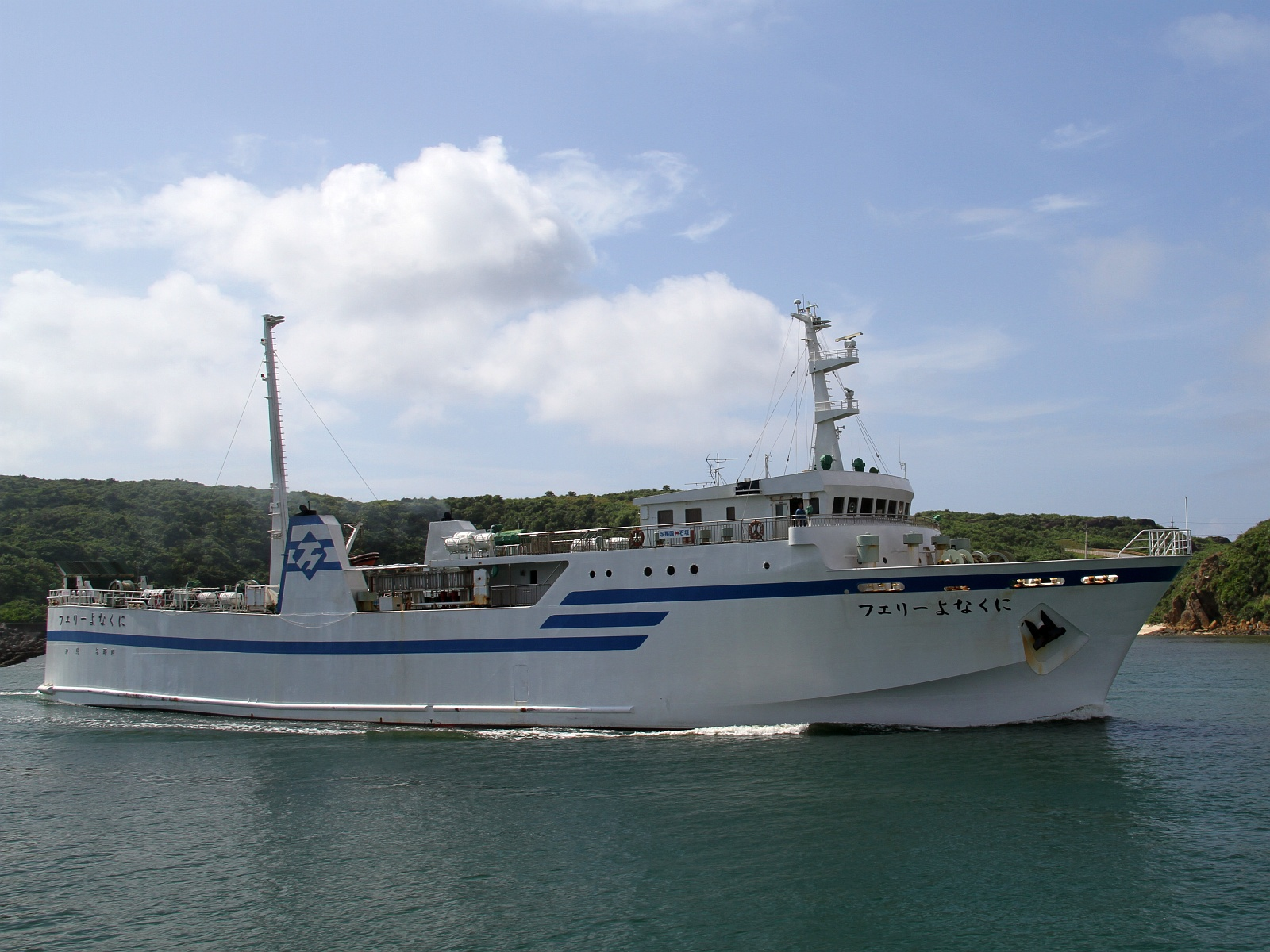
Ferry Yonakuni of Fukuyama Kaiun, off shore Taketomi Island

- Aguni Village Ferry 粟国村営
- Anei Kankō 安栄観光
- Daitō Kaiun 大東海運
- Fukuyama Kaiun 福山海運
- Hateruma Kaiun 波照間海運
- Ie Village Ferry 伊江村営
- Iheya Village Ferry 伊平屋村営
- Ishigaki Dream Tours 石垣島ドリーム観光
- Izena Village Ferry 伊是名村営
- Kamiya Kankō 神谷観光
- Katsuren Kaiun 勝連海運
- Kudaka Kaiun 久高海運
- Kume Line 久米商船
- Tarama Kaiun 多良間海運
- Tokashiki Village Ferry 渡嘉敷村営
- Yaeyama Kankō Ferry 八重山観光フェリー
- Zamami Village Ferry 座間味村営

== See also ==
- List of ferry operators
