= Hankyu Ferry =

Japanese ferry company

Hankyu Ferry Co. Ltd.

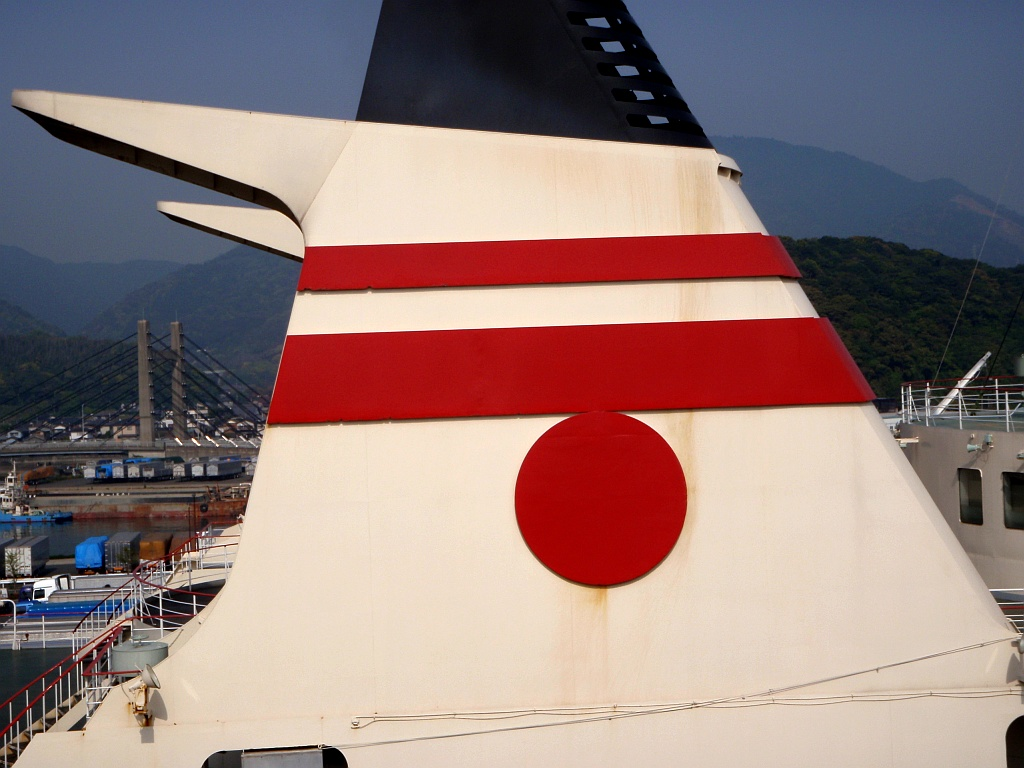
- Native name: 阪九フェリー株式会社
- Company type: Corporation
- Industry: Marine Transportation
- Founded: April 28, 1966; 60 years ago
- Headquarters: 1-1 Shinmojikita, Moji-ku, Kitakyushu, Fukuoka Prefecture; 3-2-1 Higashi Mukaiyamacho, Higashinada Ward, Kobe, Hyōgo Prefecture, Japan
- Area served: Kyushu, Osaka, and Kobe
- Key people: Yuichi Shimazu (President & CEO)
- Number of employees: 223 people (as of April 2016)
- Parent: SHK Line Group
- Website: www.han9f.co.jp

Hankyu Ferry (Japanese: 阪九フェリー株式会社, romanized: Hankyū Ferī Kabushiki Gaisha) is a Japanese shipping company headquartered Kitakyushu, Fukuoka Prefecture, Japan. The company operates ferry routes connecting the Hanshin Industrial Region and Kitakyushu, and is recognized as Japan’s first long-distance car ferry operator. Hankyu Ferry is part of the SHK Line Group, led by Kanko Kisen, and forms one of its core companies alongside Shin Nihonkai Ferry and Kampu Ferry. It is also a member of the Midori-kai Association and belongs to the Sanwa Group.

== History ==
In 1964, Japan’s coastal shipping industry faced several challenges, including the enactment of the Coastal Shipping Business Act and the Coastal Shipping Association Act, the increase in long-distance trucking following the opening of the Meishin Expressway, and rising labor costs and shortages among dockworkers. In response, Toyoshu Iriya, president of Kanko Kaiun (now Kanko Kisen), proposed modernizing maritime transport through the use of ferries, roll-on/roll-off (Ro-Ro) ships, or container ships as part of a “sea bypass” concept.

Since cargo handling costs were placing a strain on company operations, he chose ferries, which could significantly reduce handling expenses by allowing trucks to be loaded directly onto vessels. In November of the same year, a Long-Distance Ferry Research Department was established within the company.

At the time, no precedent existed for long-distance car ferry routes in Japan, and there was skepticism about the project’s feasibility. To verify profitability, the company conducted field surveys of truck traffic at Sumaura Park in Kobe and near the Kanmon Tunnel exit, supplemented by data from the Land Transport Bureau and Japanese National Railways. The survey results exceeded expectations, confirming sufficient demand for long-distance ferry service.

Hankyu Ferry began operations in 1968, initially using its own trucks to fill empty space on the car deck. With the launch of its second vessel, Dairoku Hankyu, the company established daily service between Kobe and Kokura. Truck traffic increased rapidly, and the company became profitable within six months of launching operations. In 1973, Meimon Car Ferry and Taiyo Ferry (later merged in 1984 to form Meimon Taiyo Ferry) opened a parallel route, beginning long-term competition that continues today.

== Timeline ==
Year	Event
1965	Founding promoters’ meeting held.
1966	Kanko Kisen establishes Hankyu Ferry Co., Ltd.
1967	License obtained to operate regular passenger routes between Kobe and Kokura.
1968	August 10 – Kobe (Uozaki)–Kokura (Himei) route opens as Japan’s first long-distance car ferry route. The first ship, Ferry Hankyu, enters service. November – Second ship Dairoku Hankyu begins operation, enabling daily service.
1969	Kanko Kisen establishes Shin Nihonkai Ferry and Kanpu Ferry, forming the foundation of the SHK Line Group (Shin Nihonkai–Hankyu–Kanpu).
1970–1977	Expansion of the fleet with vessels such as Ferry Seto, Ferry Harima, Ferry Nagato, and Ferry Akashi.
1978	January 23 – Izumiotsu–Kokura route opens with 24th Hankyu and 32nd Hankyu.
1983–1984	Launch of New Yamato and New Miyako on the Izumiotsu–Kokura route; headquarters relocated from Shimonoseki to Kobe.
1988	New Harima and New Seto enter service; operations moved to the newly built Rokko Island Ferry Terminal.
1991	Terminal moved from Kokura to Shinmoji; New Nagato and New Akashi enter service. Headquarters functions transferred to Shinmoji.
1995	The Kobe earthquake severely damages Rokko Island Pier; routes temporarily diverted to Izumiotsu.
1995–1996	New ferries Settsu and Suou enter service; operations adjusted between Kobe and Izumiotsu routes.
2001	New terminal opens at Izumiotsu Port.
2003	Yamato (2003) and Tsukushi enter service on the Izumiotsu–Shinmoji route.
2005–2009	Fare adjustments introduced; reduction of daily sailings due to demand.
2014–2015	New ships Izumi and Hibiki launched on the Izumiotsu–Shinmoji route.
2019–2020	New vessels Settsu and Yamato (second generation) delivered, replacing older units.
2021	Tsukushi retired and sold to 2GO Group of the Philippines.

== Routes ==
For detailed and updated information, refer to the official website.

Service	Departure Port	Arrival Port	Distance	Vessels in Service
Kobe (Downbound) No. 1	Port of Kobe (Rokko Island Ferry Terminal)	Port of Shinmoji (Terminal 1)	454 km	Settsu, Yamato
Kobe (Upbound) No. 1	Shinmoji Port	Kobe Port	454 km	Settsu, Yamato
Izumiotsu (Downbound) No. 1	Izumiotsu Port	Shinmoji Port (Terminal 2)	458 km	Izumi, Hibiki
Izumiotsu (Upbound) No. 1	Shinmoji Port	Izumiotsu Port	458 km	Izumi, Hibiki

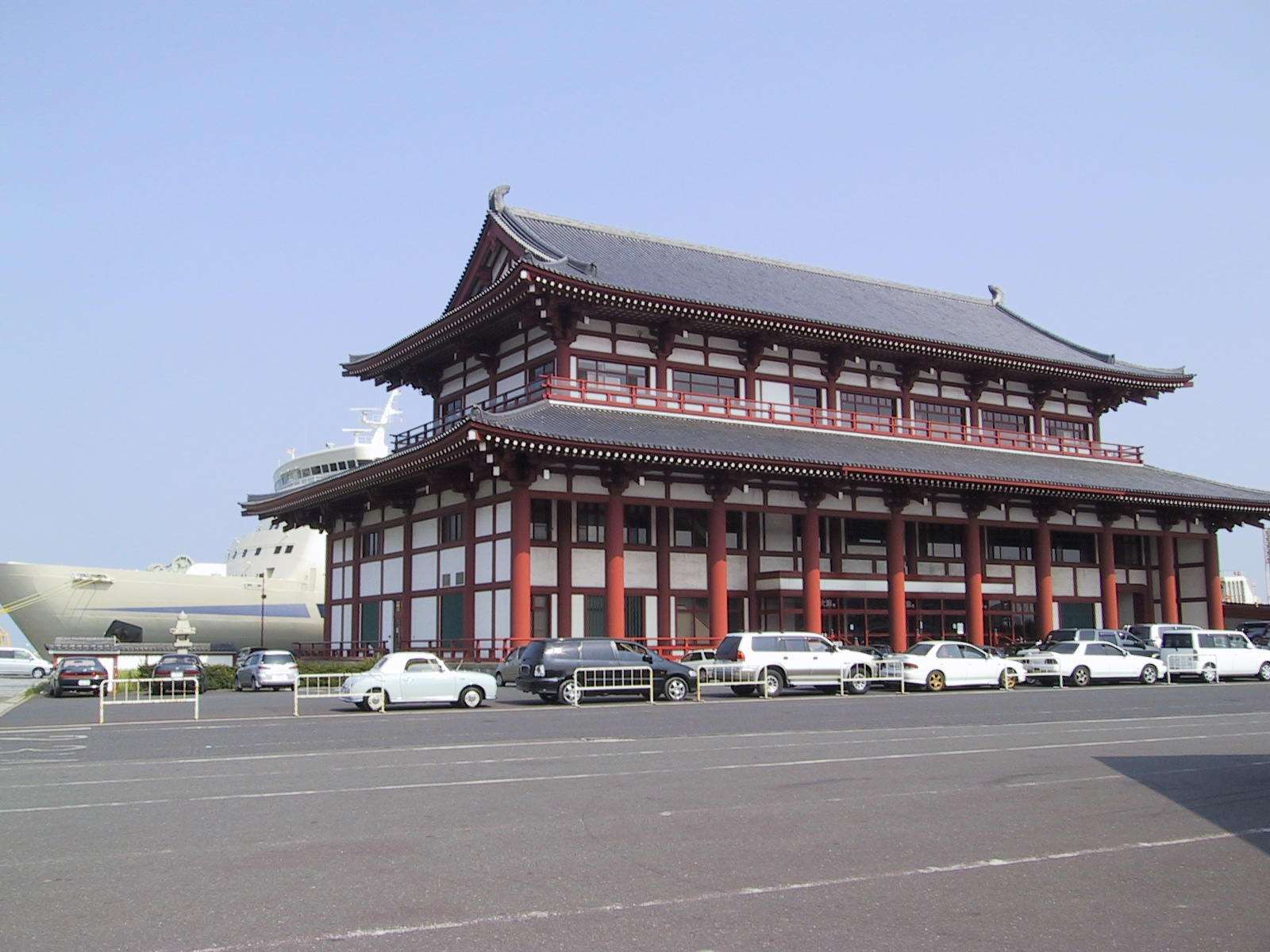
Hankyu Ferry Terminal at Shinmoji.

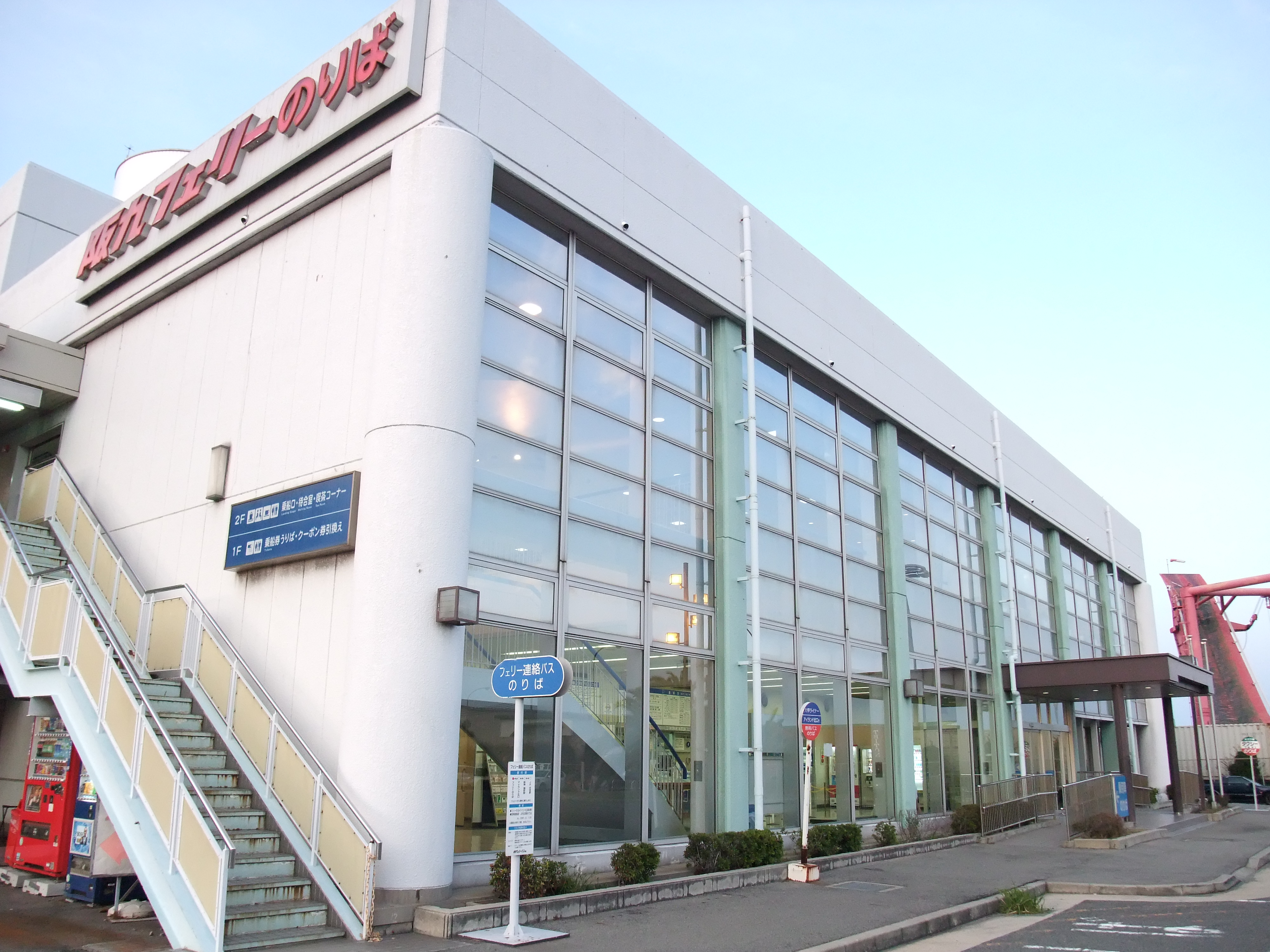
Hankyu Ferry Terminal at Kobe.

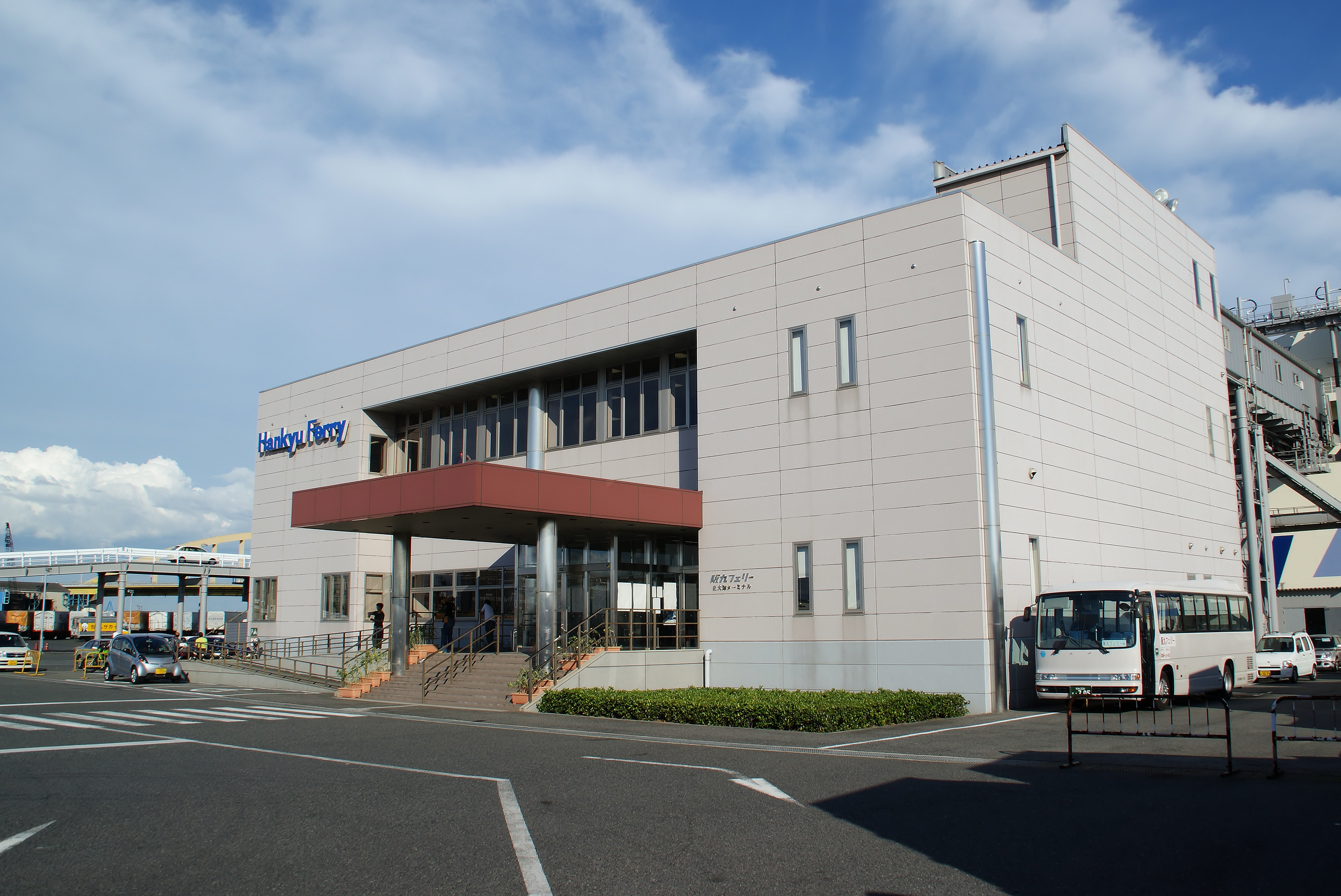
Hankyu Ferry Terminal at Izumiotsu.

Former routes

- Kobe Port – Kanda Port (1975–1980; inherited from Nishinihon Ferry)
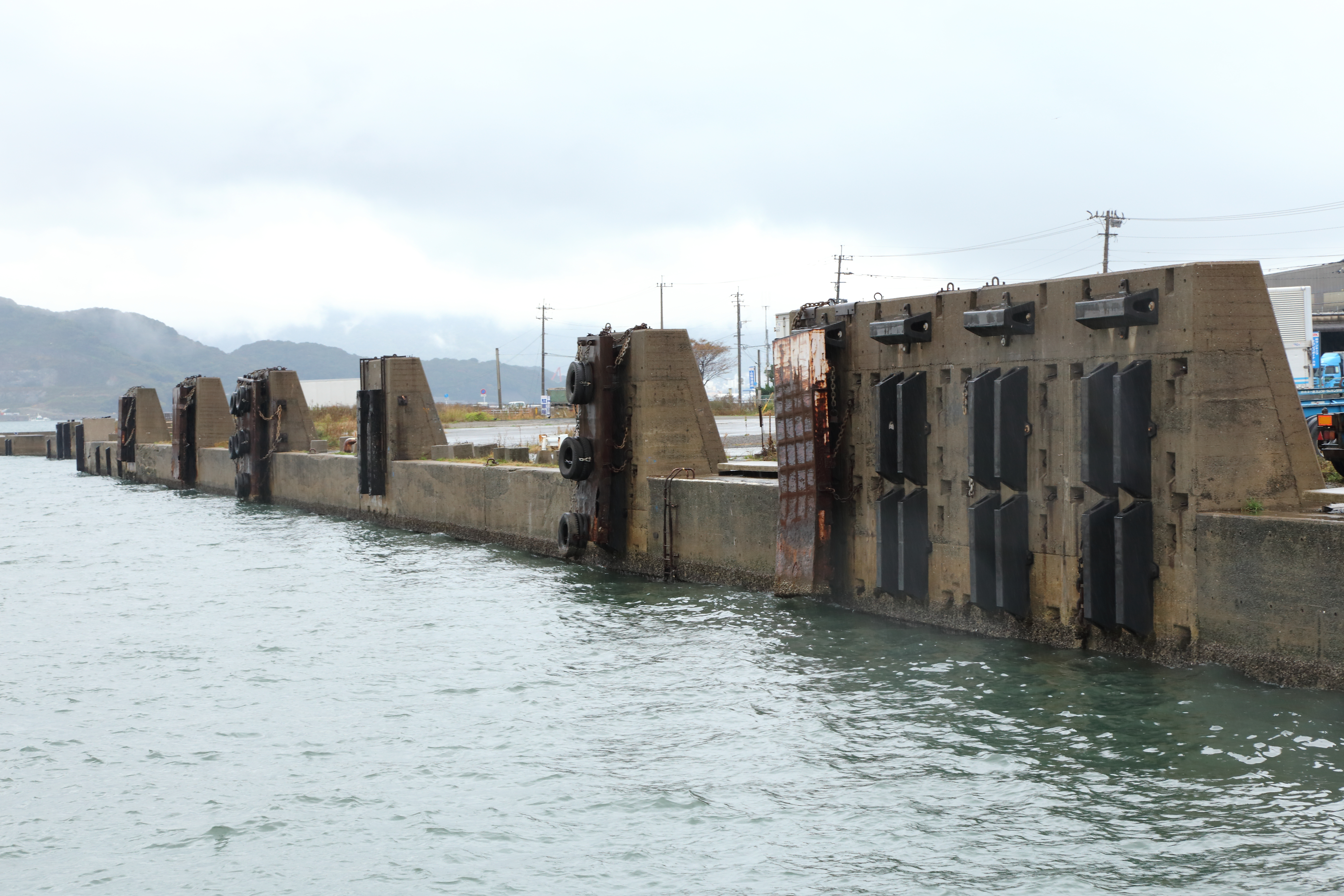
The former ferry terminal at Kokura.

Planned routes

- Kobe Port – Shimonoseki Port – Kokura Port (initial plan at company founding)
- Osaka Nanko – Hakata Port (1970s proposal)

== Vessels ==
The funnel mark features a thin line on top representing han (half) and a circle on the bottom representing kyu (ball), together symbolizing Hankyu.

The current livery is beige with light blue lines on the bow and stern of the hull, a single blue line on the front half, and a double blue line on the rear half that forms a U-shape when viewed from the port side. The blue Hankyu Ferry logo is placed at the center. This design has been used since theYamato (1st generation) and Tsukushi entered service in 2003.

Ship allocation by service is as follows (with exceptions during docking periods):

- Izumiotsu departures and arrivals: Izumi and Hibiki
- Kobe departures and arrivals: Settsu and Yamato

=== Current Vessels ===
Ship name	Completed	Launched	Gross tonnage (tons)	Length (m)	Beam (m)	Service speed (knots)	Passenger capacity	Truck capacity	Car capacity	Builder
Izumi	2014	January 22, 2015	15,897	195	29.6	23.5	643	191	184	Mitsubishi Heavy Industries, Shimonoseki Shipyard
Hibiki	2014	April 21, 2015	15,897	195	29.6	23.5	643	191	184	Mitsubishi Heavy Industries, Shimonoseki Shipyard
Settsu	February 2020	March 10, 2020	16,300	195	29.6	23.5	663	277	188	Mitsubishi Heavy Industries, Shimonoseki Shipyard
Yamato (2nd generation)	June 2020	June 30, 2020	16,300	195	29.6	23.5	663	277	188	Mitsubishi Heavy Industries, Shimonoseki Shipyard

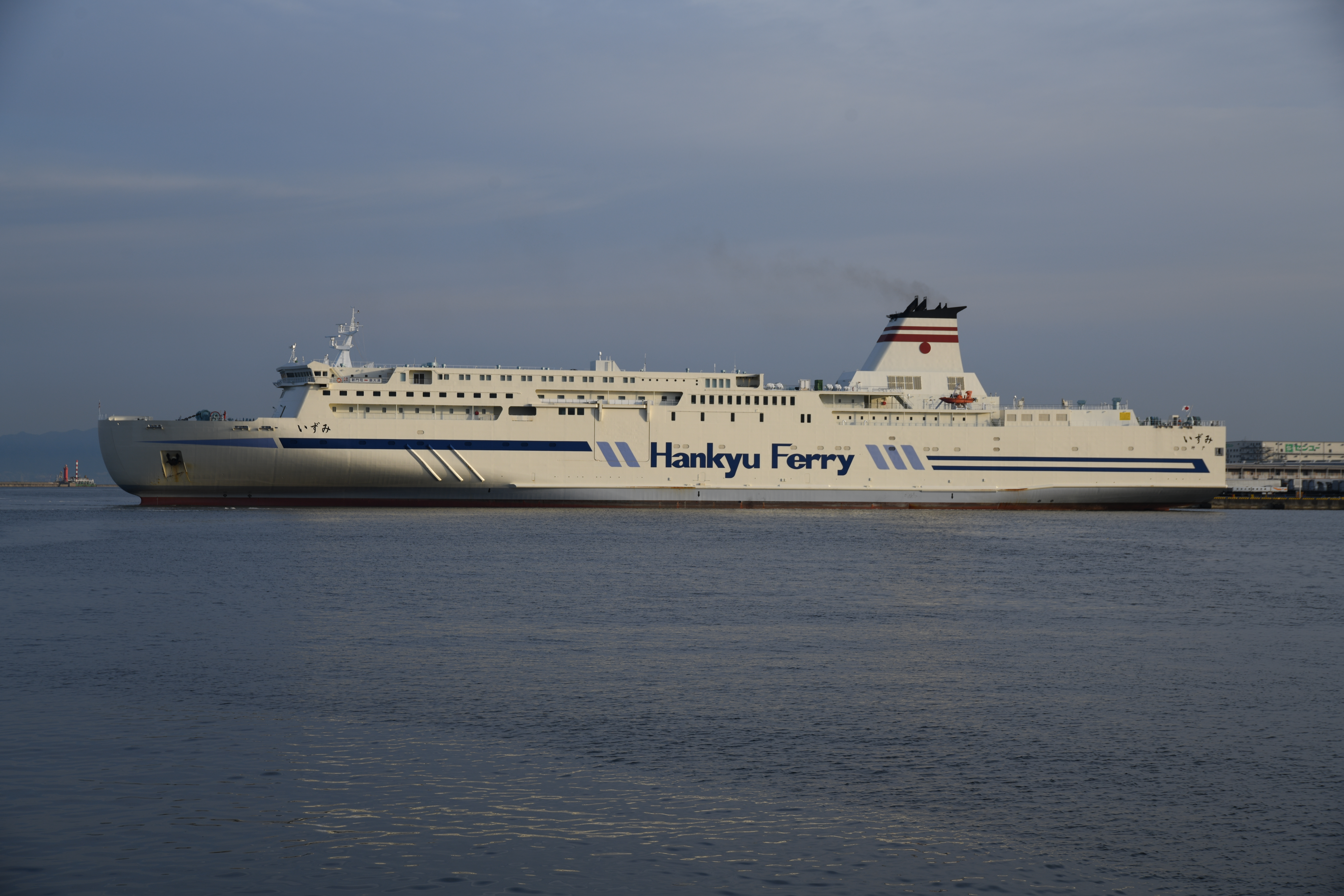
Izumi docking at Izumiotsu Port.

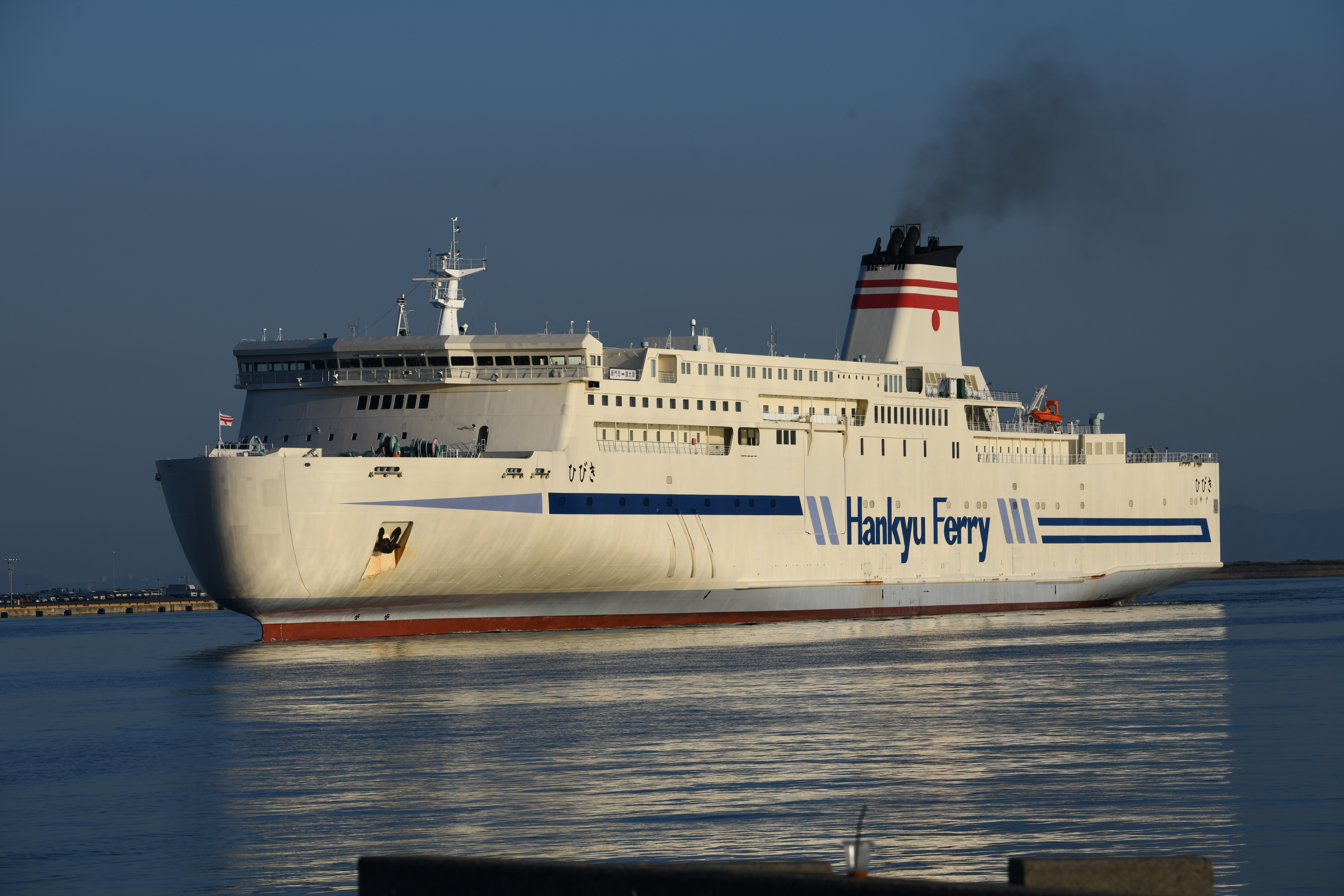
Hibiki entering Izumiotsu Port.

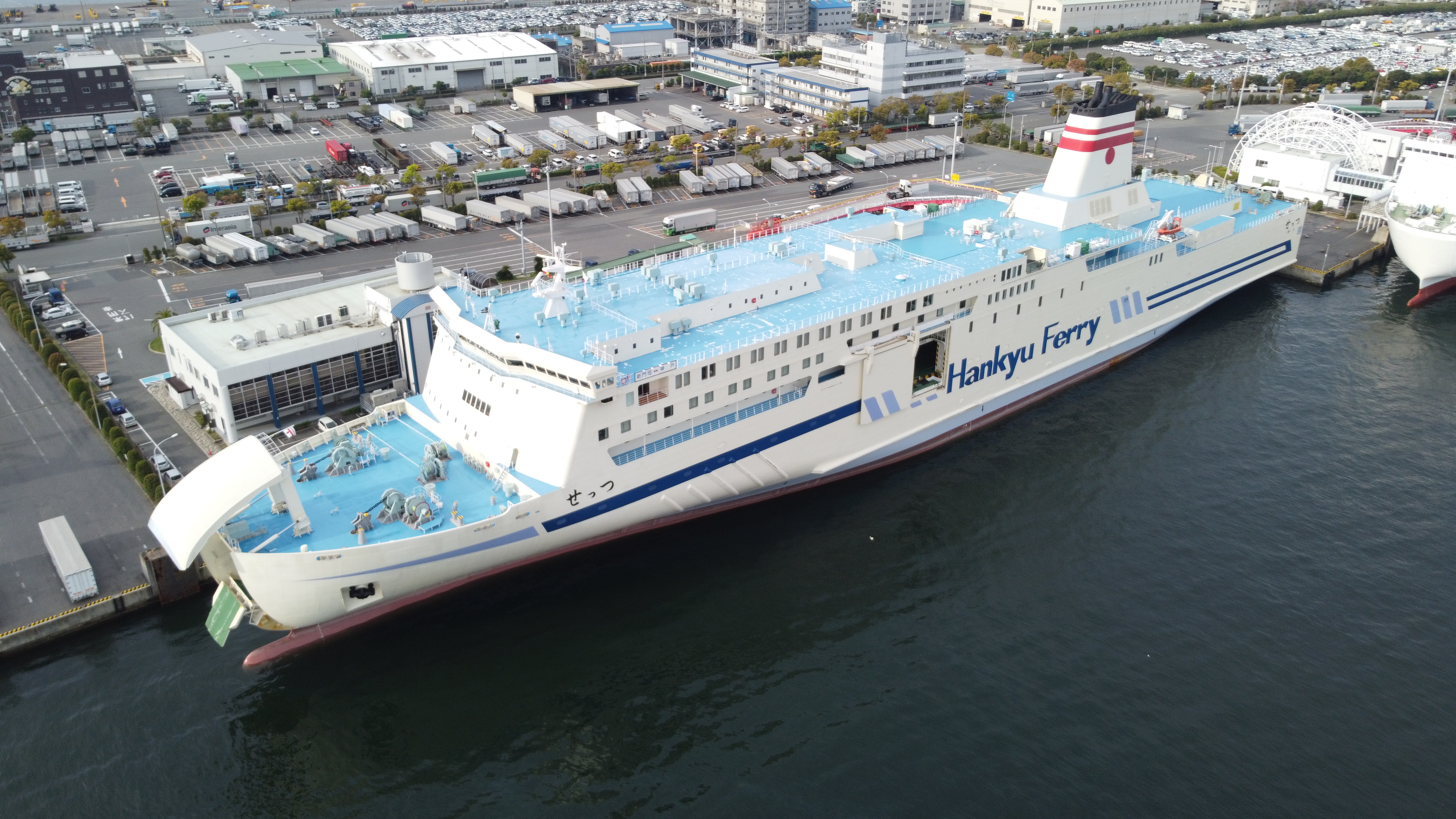
Ferry Settsu moored at Rokko Island.

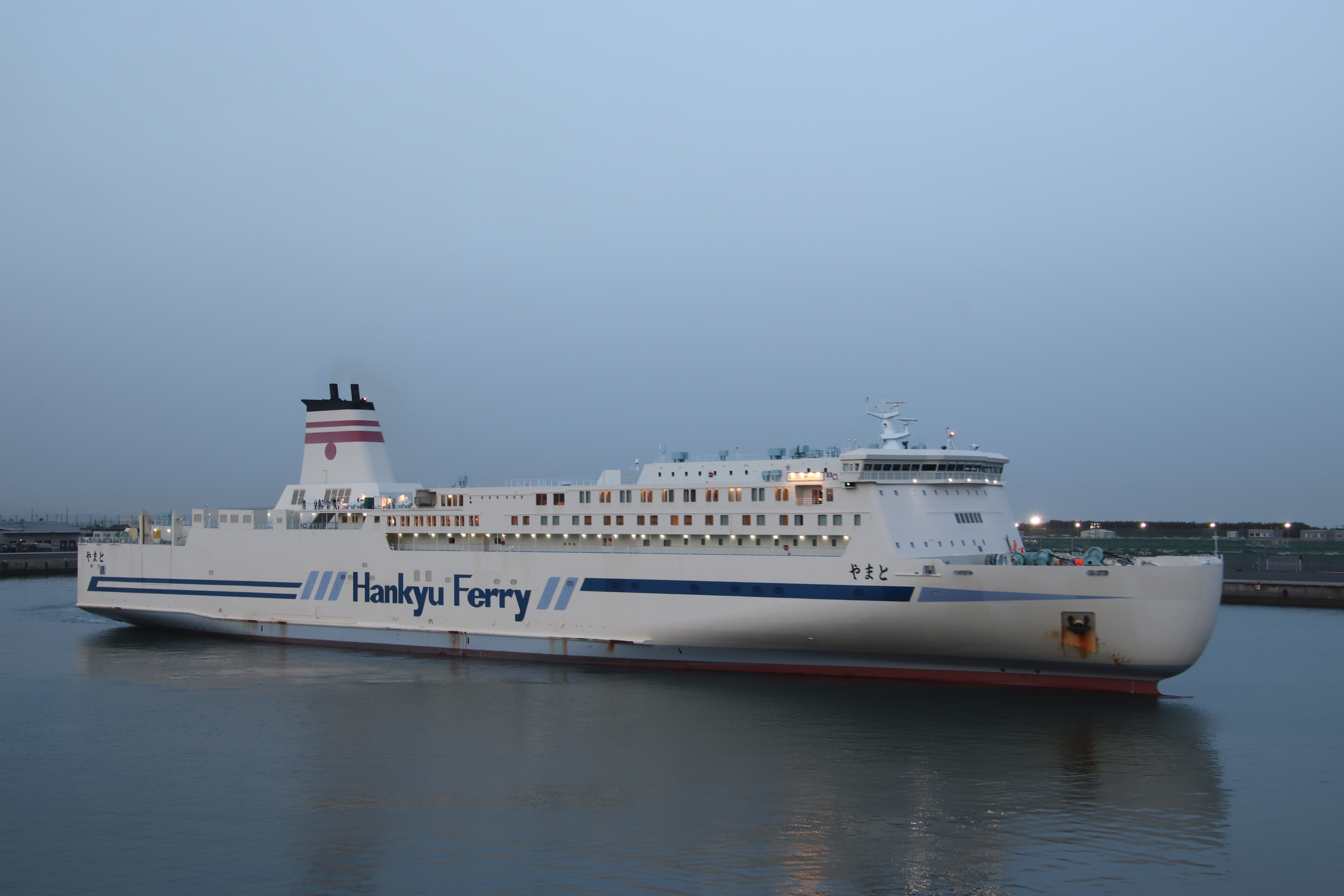
Yamato departs from Shinmoji Port

=== Former Vessels ===
Ship name	Completed	Launched	Gross tonnage (tons)	Length (m)	Beam (m)	Speed (knots)	Passenger capacity	Truck capacity	Car capacity	Builder	Notes
Ferry Hankyu	1968	June 11, 1968	5,201.8	127.7	22.4	16.8	1,195	80	60	Hayashikane Shipbuilding, Shimonoseki	Entered service on Kokura–Kobe route (Aug 10, 1968); sold to Greece (1986) and scrapped in Aliağa, India (2007)
Hankyu No. 6	1968	November 2, 1968	5,011.1	127.3	22.4	16.8	1,195	80	60	Hayashikane Shipbuilding, Shimonoseki	Became Ferry Kampu (2nd gen), later Kibo Maru; sold to Greece and scrapped (1986)
Ferry Seto	1970	August 1970	6,523.2	149.1	22.8	20.0	1,193	92	120	Hayashikane Shipbuilding, Shimonoseki	Sold to the Philippines as Nasipit Princess (Sulpicio Lines), scrapped
Ferry Harima	1970	November 19, 1970	6,521.1	149.1	22.8	20.0	1,193	92	120	Hayashikane Shipbuilding, Shimonoseki	Sold to the Philippines as Cotabato Princess (Sulpicio Lines); scrapped 2009
Ferry Nagato	1972	September 3, 1972	7,009.2	150.1	22.8	20.5	1,185	94	120	Kanda Shipyard, Kawajiri	Sold to Greece as Grace M / Felicia; scrapped in Aliağa, Turkey (2003)
Ferry Akashi	1972	November 20, 1972	6,987.0	150.1	22.8	20.5	1,185	94	120	Kanda Shipyard, Kawajiri	Sold to Greece as Dame M, later Salamis Star, Marrakech Express (Comanav), then became Bni Nsar, detained and later scrapped at Aliaga, Turkey
Hankyu No. 16	1972	April 1973	5,687	135.5	22.0	20.25	770	84	109	Kanda Shipyard, Kawajiri	Ex-Tsukushi; sold to South Korea as Ferry Busan, later Panagia Krimniotissa (Greece), broken up at Aliaga, Turkey
Hankyu No. 17	1973	December 18, 1973	5,748.3	135.5	22.0	20.25	770	84	109	Kanda Shipyard, Kawajiri	Ex-Hakata; renamed multiple times (Ferry Kampu, Ferry Pukwan, Eun Ha); ended as Panagia Agiasou (Greece), decommissioned in 2008
Hankyu No. 24	1976	January 24, 1976	6,936.2	151.5	22.8	21.7	950	114	38	Kanda Shipyard, Kawajiri	Sold to the Philippines as St. Joseph the Worker (Negros Navigation and 2GO Group), scrapped at Chittagong, Bangladesh
Hankyu No. 32	1976	1976	6,950.9	151.5	22.8	21.7	950	114	38	Kanda Shipyard, Kawajiri	Sold to the Philippines as St. Peter the Apostle (Negros Navigation and 2GO Group), scrapped at Chittagong, Bangladesh
New Yamato	1983	October 16, 1983	11,919.0	173.0	26.8	22.5	760	166	75	Kanda Shipyard, Kawajiri	Sold to the Philippines as Princess of the Universe (Sulpicio Lines), scrapped
New Miyako	1984	January 29, 1984	11,914.0	173.0	26.8	22.5	760	166	75	Kanda Shipyard, Kawajiri	Sold to the Philippines as SuperFerry 12 (WG&A) then to 2GO Group as St. Pope John Paul II, scrapped at Chittagong, Bangladesh (2021)
New Harima	1984	March 18, 1984	12,589.0	174.5	26.8	22.6	921	166	75	Kanda Shipyard, Kawajiri	Sold to Philippines as SuperFerry 17, later Huadong Pearl III (China–Korea), Isabel del Mar (Spain), scrapped in Aliaga, Turkey
New Seto	1988	June 26, 1988	12,589.0	174.5	26.8	22.6	921	166	75	Kanda Shipyard, Kawajiri	Sold to the Philippines as SuperFerry 18, then to China as Asia Pearl, later Huadong Pearl VI, later scrapped
New Akashi	1990	Mar 19, 1991	14,988	185.5	26.8	22.9	895	180	110	Kanda Shipyard, Kawajiri	Built by Kanda Shipyard; sister ship to New Nagato, sold overseas as Daleela, in active service
New Nagato	1990	Jan 22, 1991	14,988	185.5	26.8	22.9	895	180	110	Kanda Shipyard, Kawajiri	Sold to South Korea as Star Cruise / Seastar Cruise, scrapped
Ferry Suou	1995	Mar 15, 1996	15,188	189.0	27.0	23.0	810	219	77	Kanda Shipyard, Kawajiri	Later operated as Santa Lucino (South Korea) scrapped at Chittagong, Bangladesh
Ferry Settsu	1995	Dec 21, 1995	15,188	189.0	27.0	23.0	810	219	77	Kanda Shipyard, Kawajiri	Sold to South Korea as Gold Stella, scrapped at Chittagong, Bangladesh
Yamato (1st gen)	2002	Mar 27, 2003	13,353	195.0	26.4	23.5	667	229	138	Mitsubishi Heavy Industries, Shimonoseki	Sold to Stena RoRo as Stena Nova (2019), then to 2GO Group as 2GO Maligaya (2021), in active service
Tsukushi	2002	Jun 12, 2003	13,353	195.0	26.4	23.5	667	229	138	Mitsubishi Heavy Industries, Shimonoseki	Sold to 2GO Group as 2GO Masagana (2021), in active service

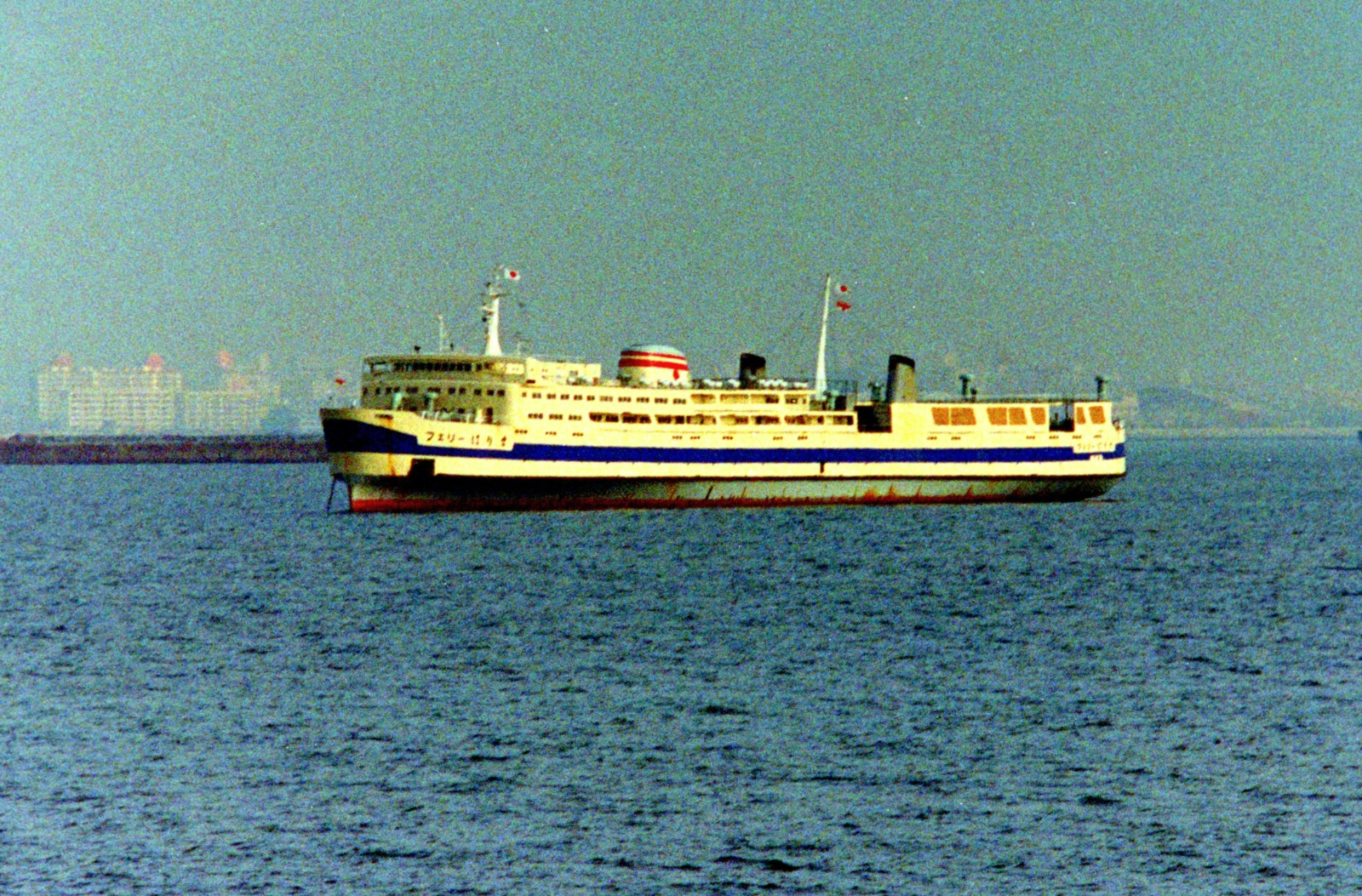
Ferry Harima heading offshore from Kobe.

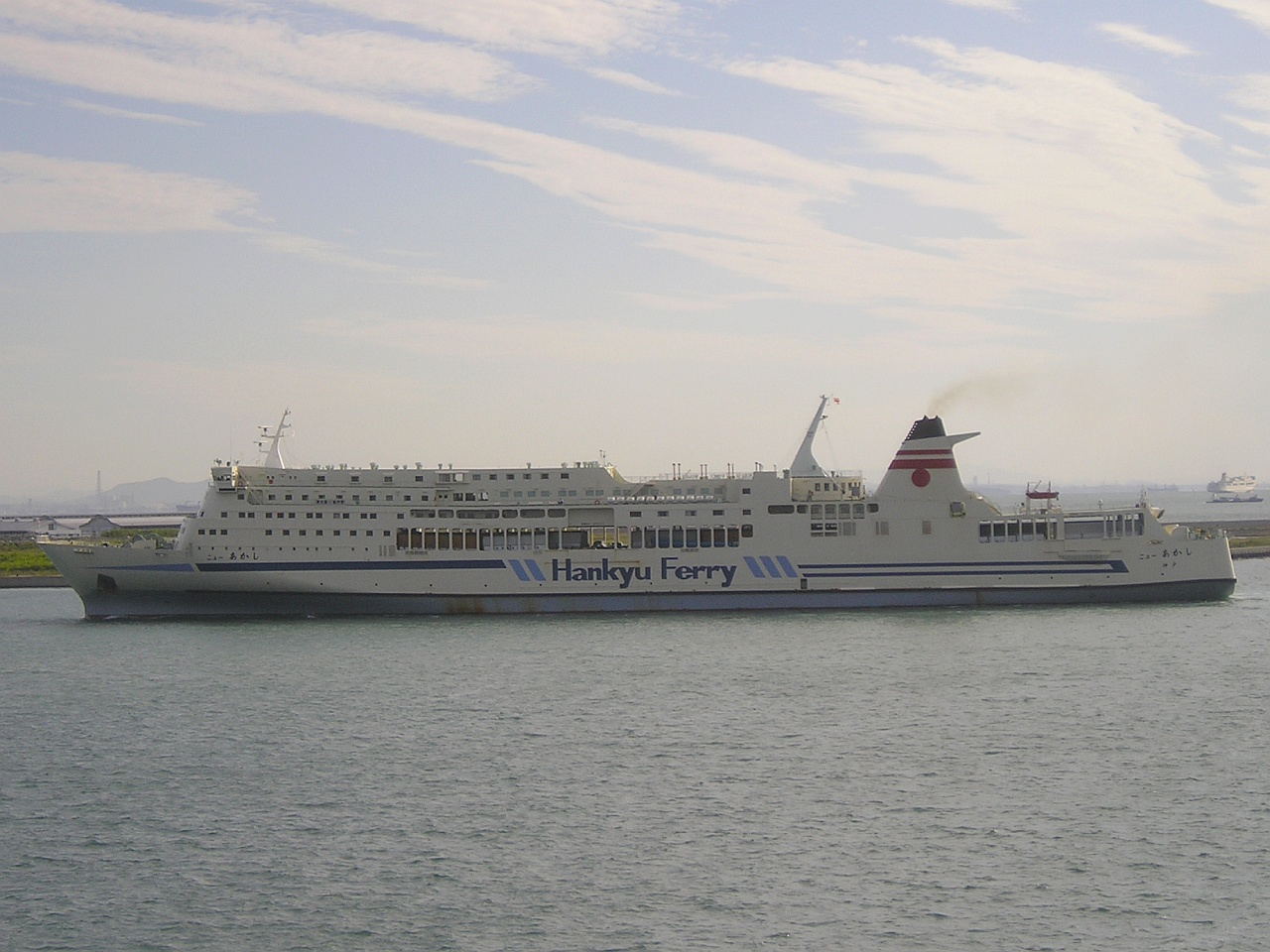
New Akashi at Shinmoji Port.

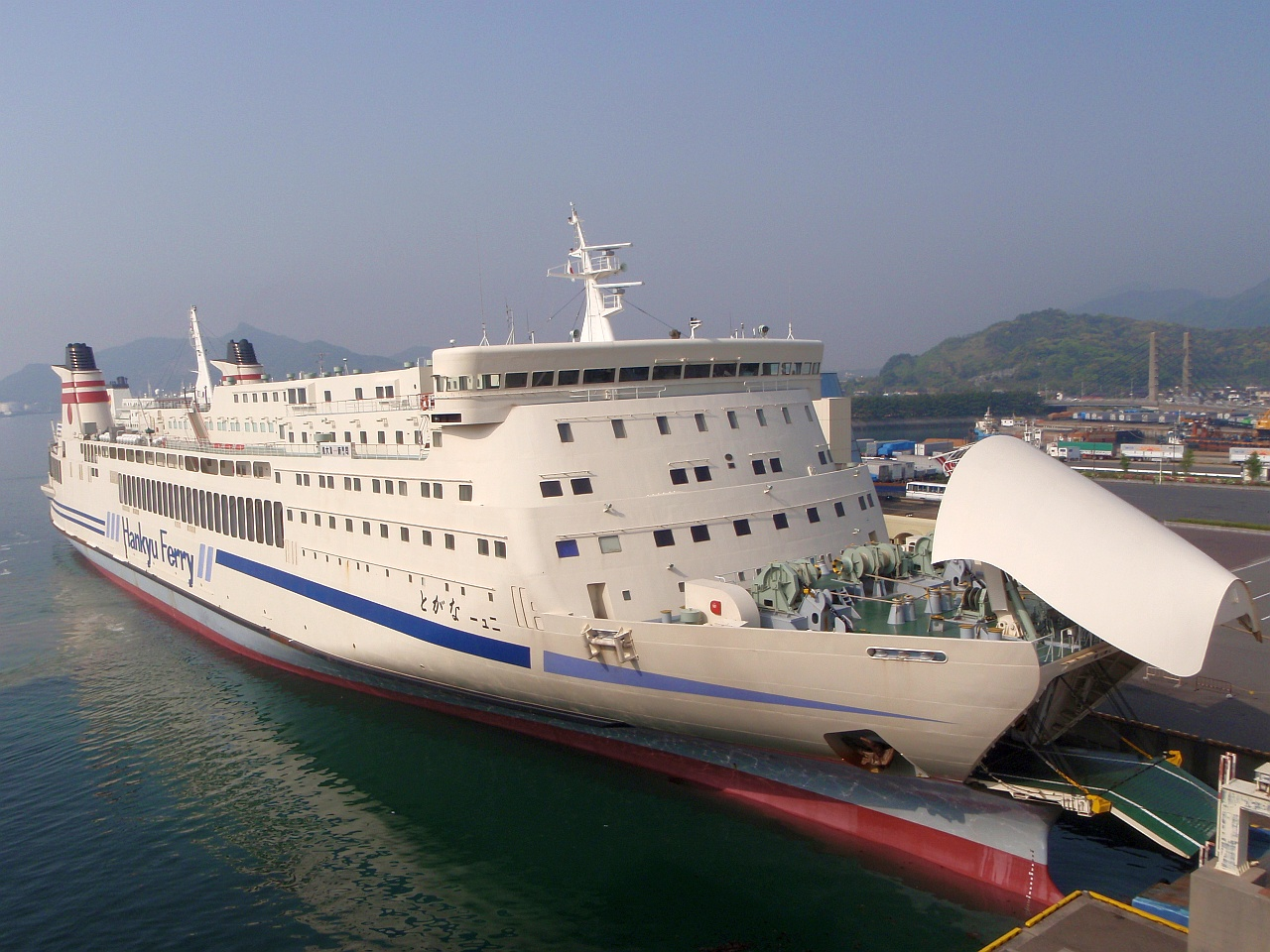
New Nagato at Shinmoji Port.

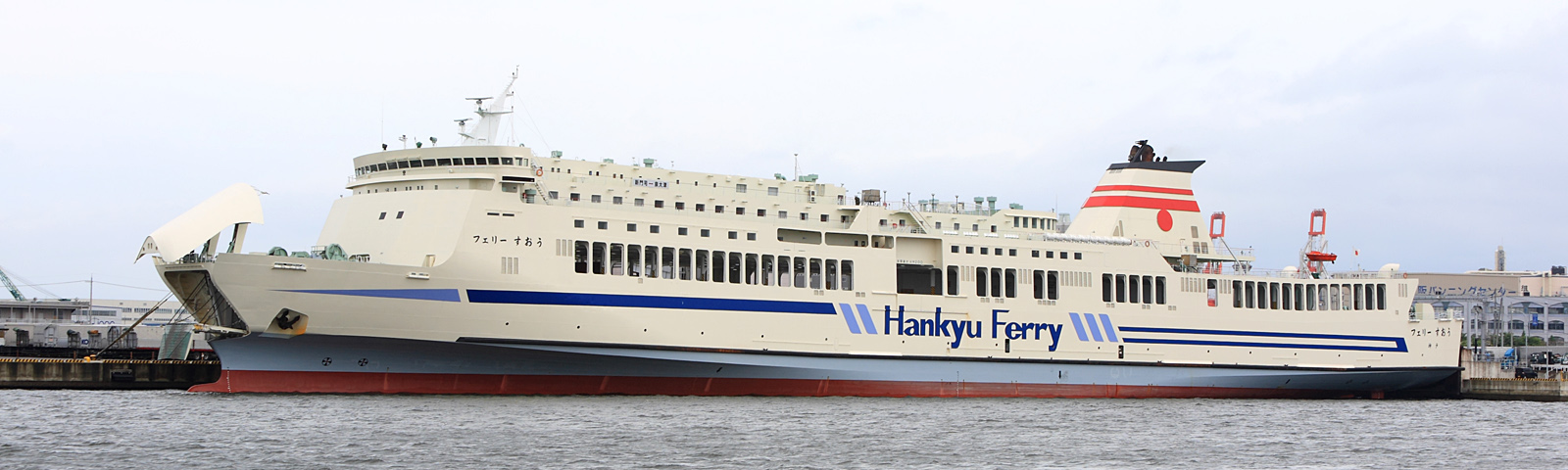
Ferry Suou at Izumiotsu Port.

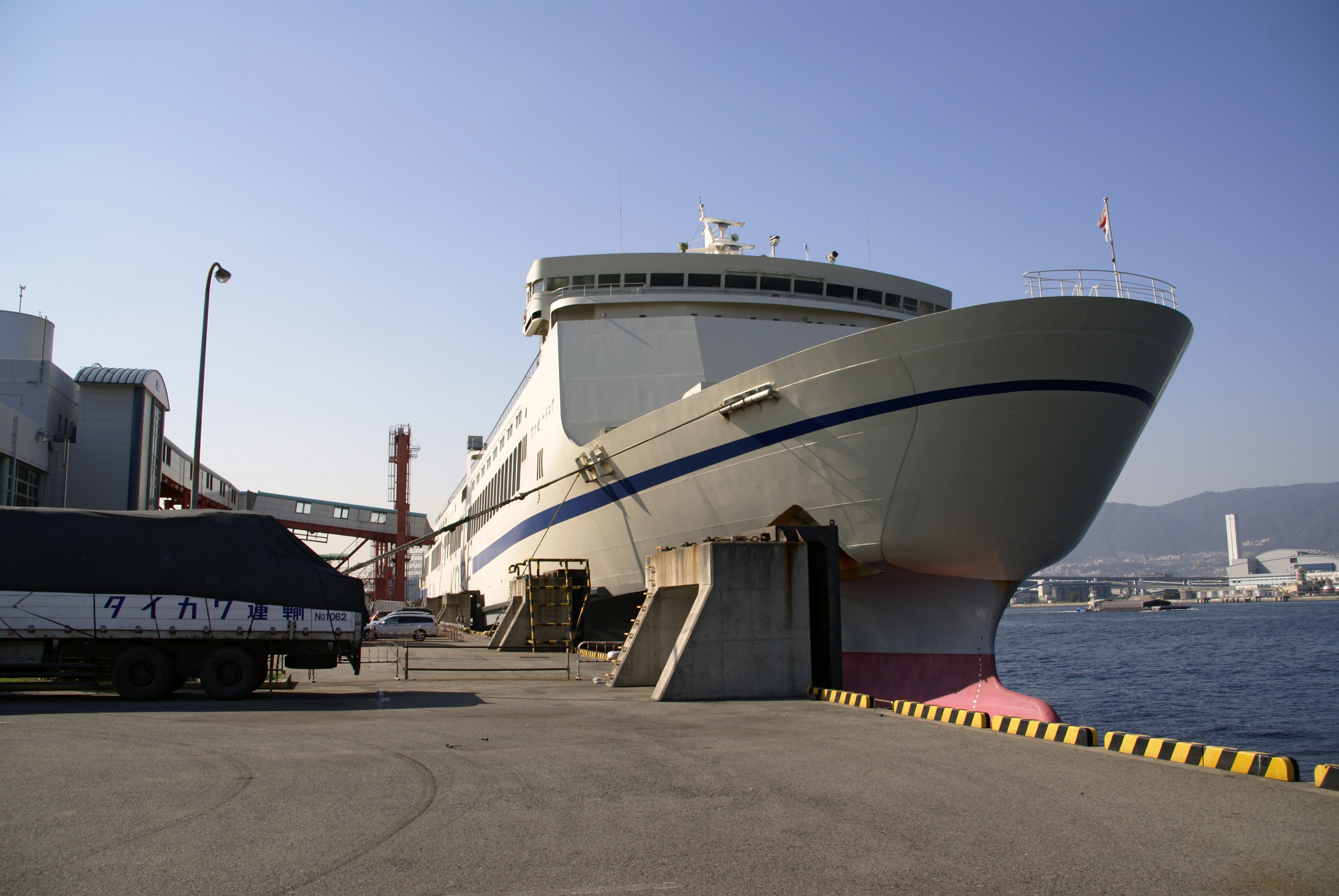
Ferry Settsu at Rokko Island Ferry Terminal.

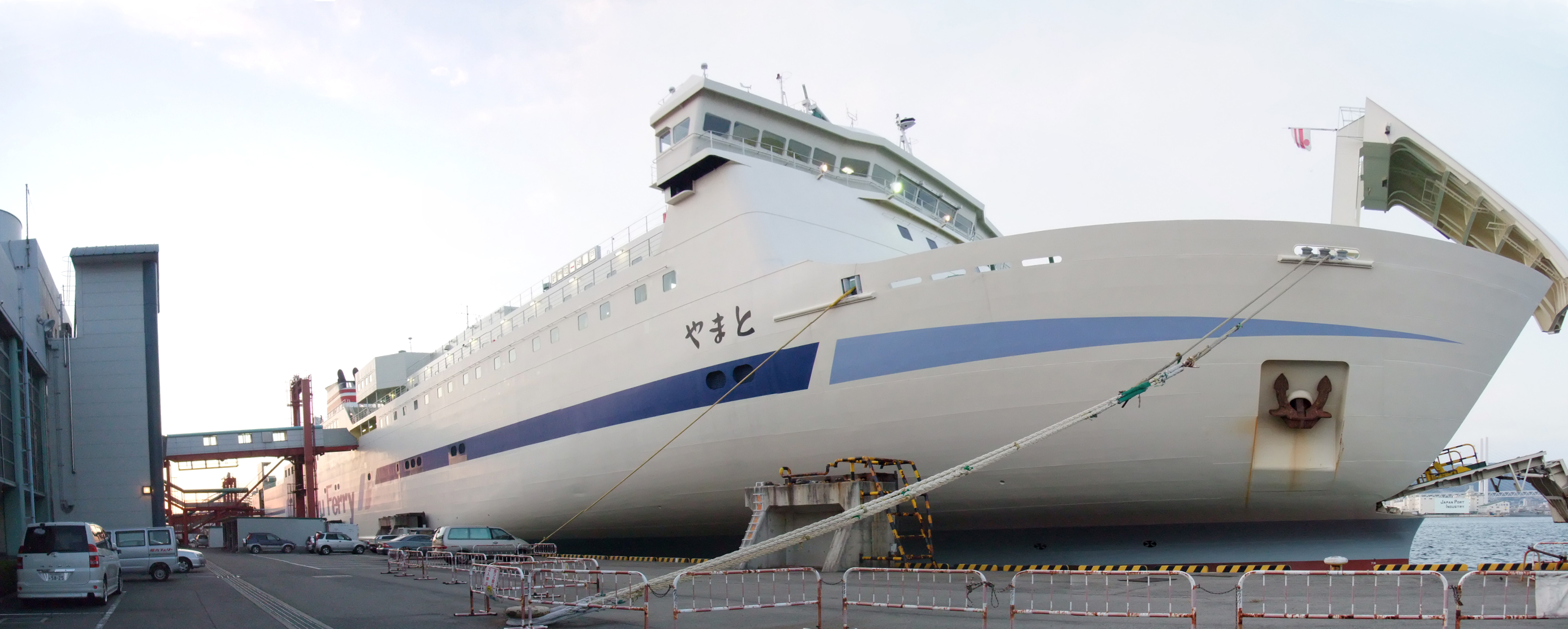
Yamato at Rokko Island Ferry Terminal.

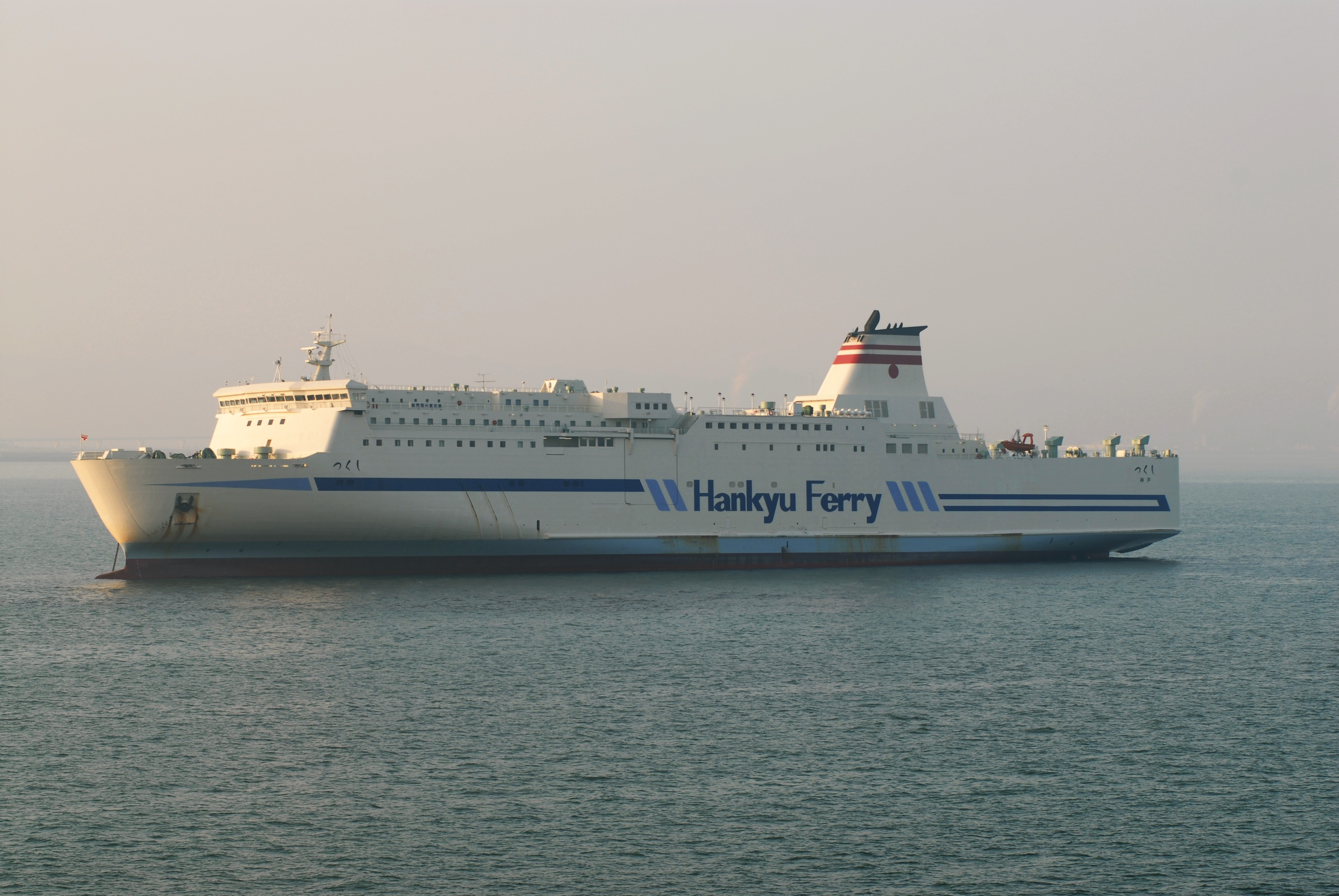
Tsukushi heading out to sea off the coast of Shinmoji Port.

== See also ==
- Shin Nihonkai Ferry
- List of ferry operators in Japan
