= Shin Nihonkai Ferry =

Marine transportation company in Japan

Shin Nihonkai Ferry Co., Ltd.

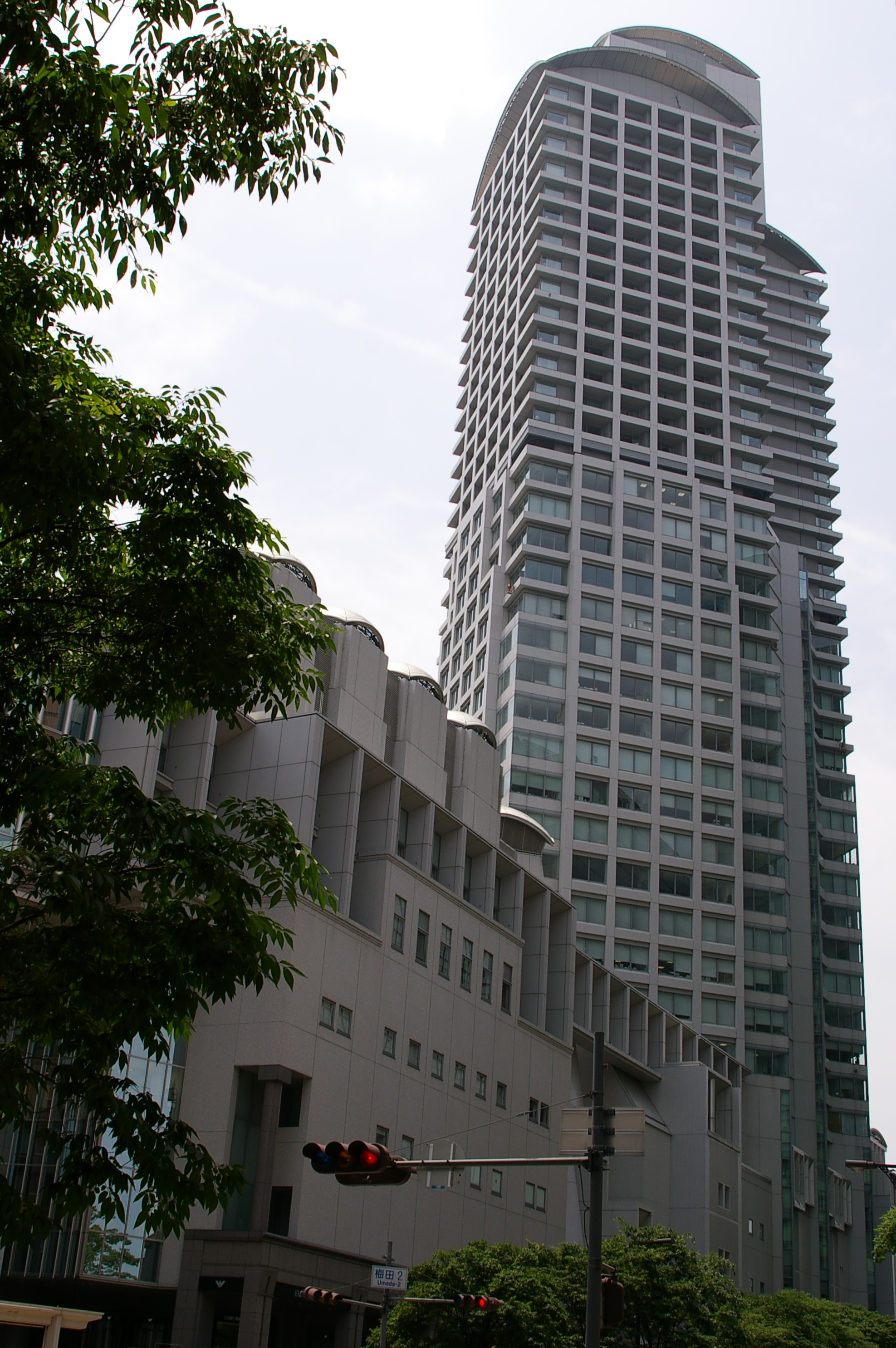
- Native name: 新日本海フェリー株式会社
- Romanized name: Shin Nihonkai Ferry Kabushiki-gaisha
- Company type: Private KK
- Industry: Marine transportation
- Founded: 11 June 1967; 59 years ago
- Headquarters: Umeda, Kita-ku, Osaka, Japan
- Website: www.snf.jp

Shin Nihonkai Ferry Co., Ltd. (新日本海フェリー株式会社, Shin Nihonkai Ferry Kabushiki-gaisha) is a marine transportation company based in Japan.

Shin Nihonkai Ferry collaborated with Mitsubishi Shipbuilding in demonstrating the first successful sea voyage using an unmanned, fully autonomous navigation system on 17 January 2022, ferrying 240 kilometres, from Shinmoji in Northern Kyushu, to the Iyonada Sea, over seven hours, with a maximum speed of 26 knots.

== Ships and Routes ==
=== Highspeed Ferries ===
Ship	Built	Gross tonnage	Length	Width	Passengers	Trucks	Cars	Speed	Routes
Hamanasu	2004	16,810	224.5 m	26.0 m	746	158	66	31	Maizuru - Otaru
Akashia	2004	16,810	224.5 m	26.0 m	746	158	66	31	Maizuru - Otaru
Suzuran (2nd Generation)	2012	17,382	224.5 m	26.0 m	613	158	58	28	Tsuruga - Tomakomai
Suisen (2nd Generation)	2012	17,382	224.5 m	26.0 m	613	158	58	28	Tsuruga - Tomakomai
Keyaki	2025	14,300	199 m	25.5 m	286	150	30	28.3	Maizuru - Otaru
Hamanasu (2nd generation)	2025	14,300	199 m	25.5 m	286	150	30	28.3	Maizuru - Otaru

=== Conventional Ferries ===
Ship	Built	Gross tonnage	Length	Width	Passengers	Trucks	Cars	Speed	Routes
Lilac	2002	18,229	199.9 m	26.5 m	846	146	58	23	Tsuruga - Niigata - Akita - Tomakomai
Yuukari	2002	18,229	199.9 m	26.5 m	846	146	58	23	Tsuruga - Niigata - Akita - Tomakomai
Lavender	2017	14,125	197.5 m	26.7 m	600	150	22	24	Niigata - Otaru
Azalea	2017	14,125	197.5 m	26.7 m	600	150	22	24	Niigata - Otaru

== Terminals ==
Shin Nihonkai Ferry operates from six terminals.

Maizuru ferry terminal
Located in Maizuru, Kyoto (35.4815°N 135.3919°E)

Tsuruga ferry terminal
Located in Tsuruga, Fukui (35.6786°N 136.0725°E)

Niigata ferry terminal
Located in Niigata, Niigata (37.9381°N 139.0702°E)

Akita ferry terminal
Located in Akita, Akita (39.7551°N 140.0586°E)

Tomakomai east ferry terminal
Located in Atsuma, Hokkaido (42.6092°N 141.8193°E)

Otaru ferry terminal
Located in Otaru, Hokkaido (43.1908°N 141.0188°E)

== See also ==
- Hankyu Ferry
- List of ferry operators in Japan
