= Port of Yokosuka =

Port in Japan

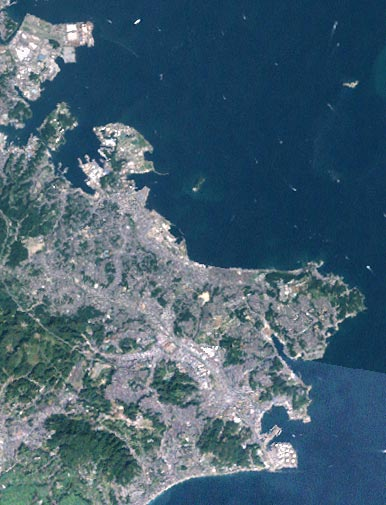
- Landsat satellite picture of Port of Yokosuka
- Interactive map of Port of Yokosuka

Location
- Country: Japan
- Coordinates: 35°17′25.2″N 139°40′54.8″E

The Port of Yokosuka (横須賀港, Yokosuka-kō) lies to the south of the Port of Yokohama on Tokyo Bay. Under the Ports and Harbors Law of Japan it is classified as an Important Port. The city of Yokosuka administers the port.

The Port of Yokosuka has 100 berths of length 4.5 m or more. It covers 13 areas from Oppama in the north to Kurihama and Nobi in the south. Kurihama is the place where Commodore Matthew Perry landed in 1853. Since then it has been developed for military, shipping, and ferry traffic. The U.S. Navy base and the Maritime Self-Defense force base lie within the Port of Yokosuka.

Located near the Nissan Oppama plant, Yokosuka is a major port for the shipping of automobiles. The fishing fleet brings in tuna and other ocean products. Tokyo-Wan Ferry links Yokosuka with the Port of Kanaya in Futtsu, Chiba Prefecture. Other ferries go to Tokyo, Izu Ōshima and Ōita in Kyūshū.
