= Port of Yokohama =

Port in Japan

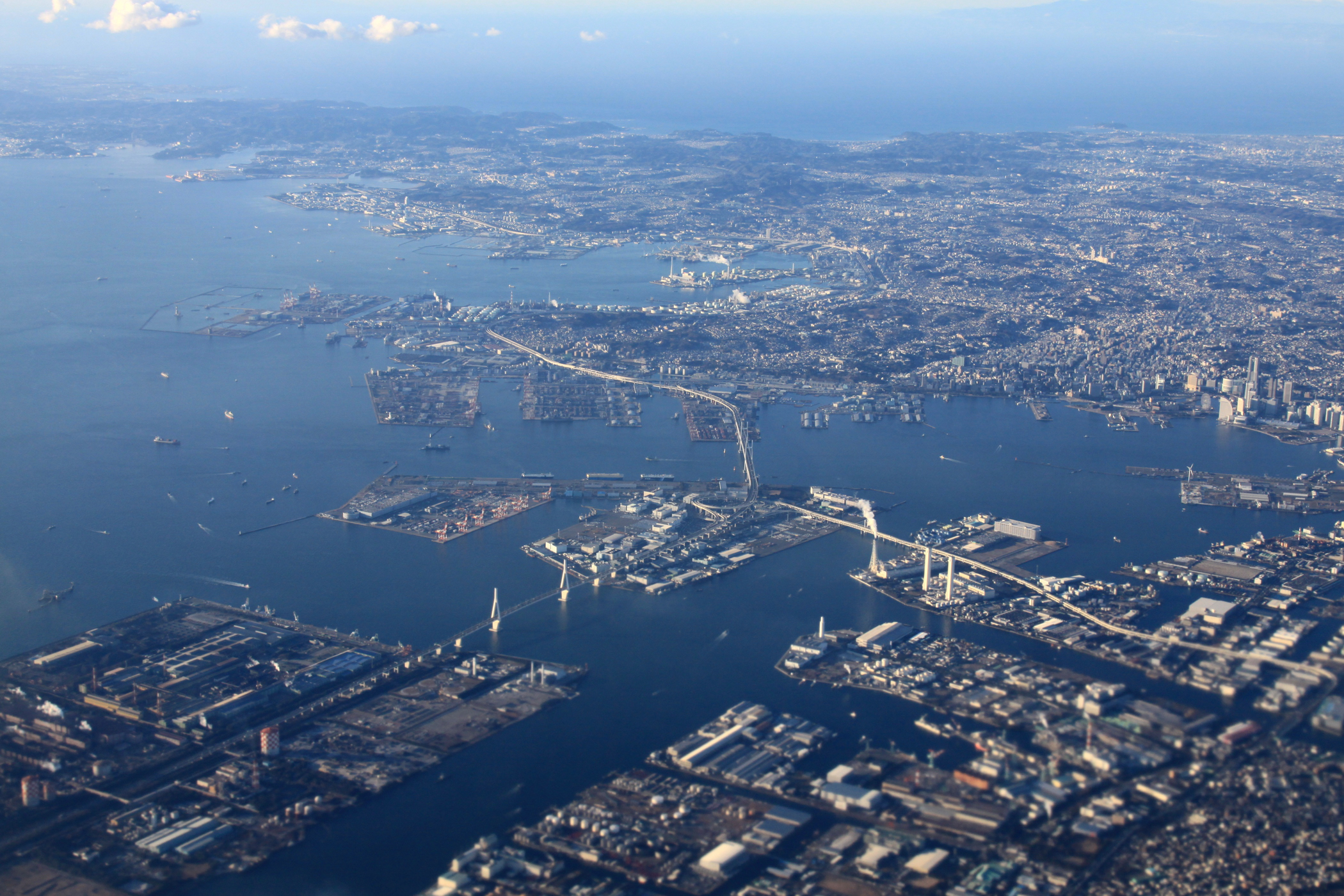
- Panorama of Yokohama Port
- Interactive map of Port of Yokohama

Location
- Country: Japan
- Location: Yokohama, Kanagawa Prefecture

Details
- Opened: June 2, 1859
- Owned by: Yokohama Port Corporation
- No. of piers: 10

Statistics
- Vessel arrivals: 37,706
- Annual cargo tonnage: 271,276,977
- Annual container volume: 2,888,220
- Website; Port of Yokohama

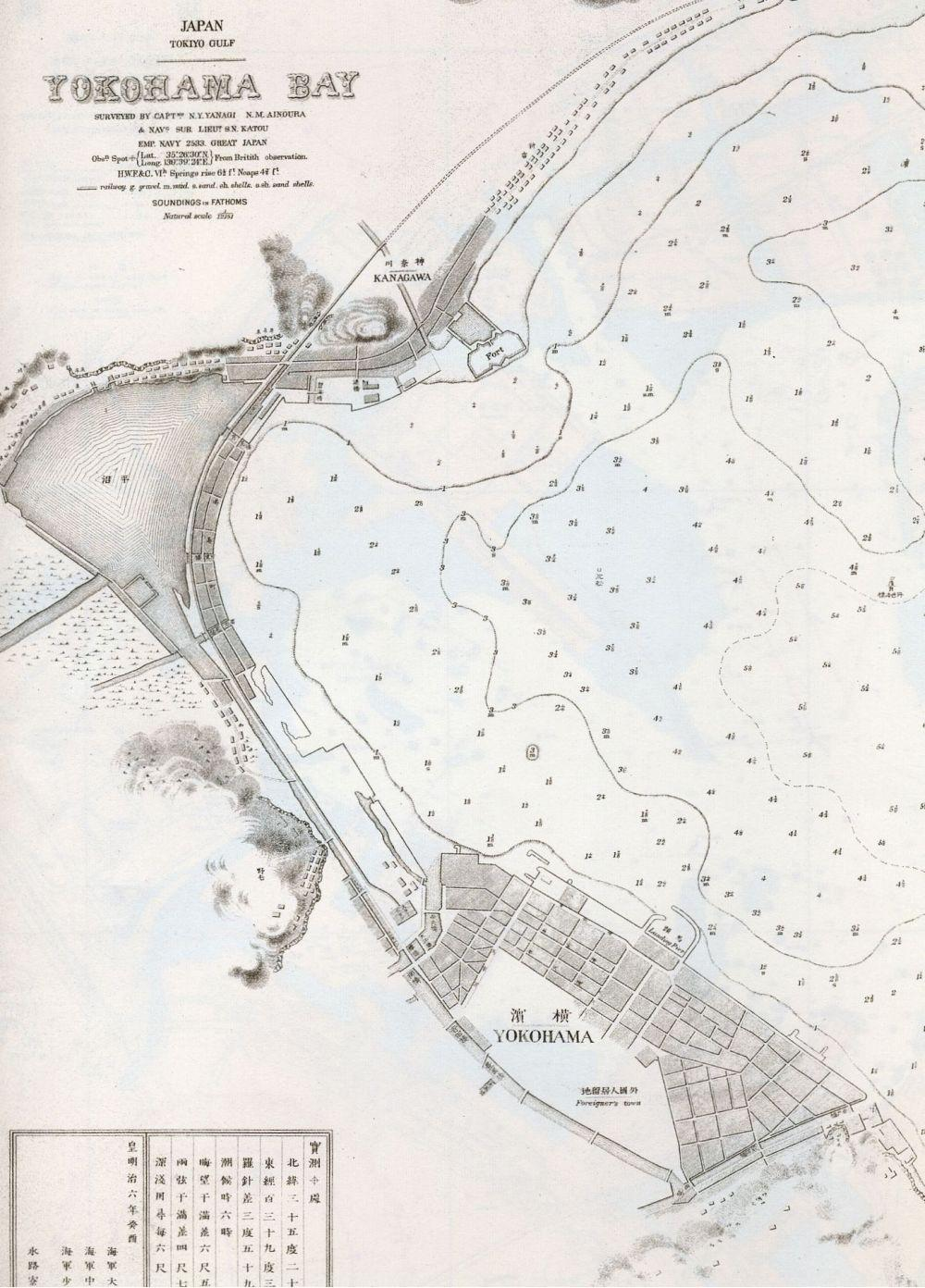
This nautical chart shows the Port of Yokohama in 1874.

The Port of Yokohama (横浜港, Yokohama-kō) is operated by the Port and Harbor Bureau of the City of Yokohama in Japan. It opens onto Tokyo Bay. The port is located at a latitude of 35.27–00°N and a longitude of 139.38–46°E. To the south lies the Port of Yokosuka; to the north, the ports of Kawasaki and Tokyo.

== History ==
The Treaty of Amity and Commerce of 1858 specified Kanagawa as an open port. The Port of Yokohama formally opened to foreign trade on the 2nd of June 1859. The port grew rapidly through the Meiji and Taisho periods as a center for raw silk export and technology import.

== Current facilities ==
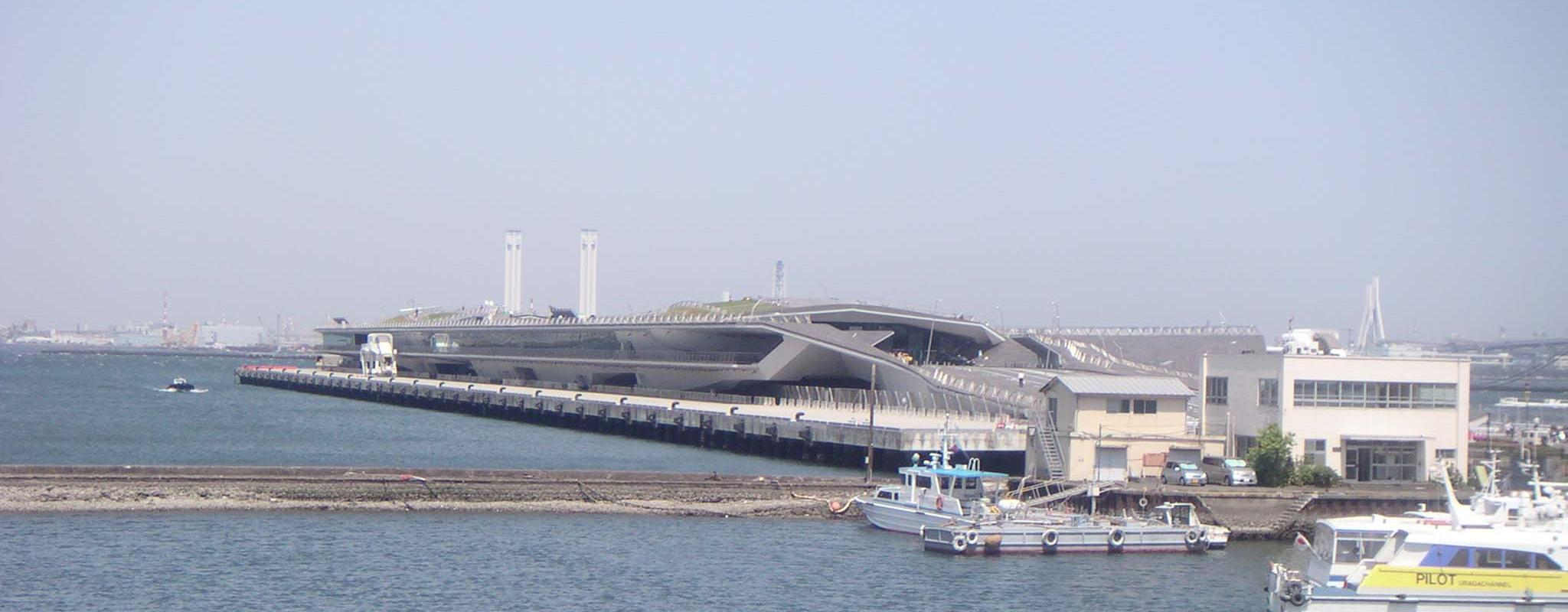
Ōsanbashi Pier symbolizes the modern port.

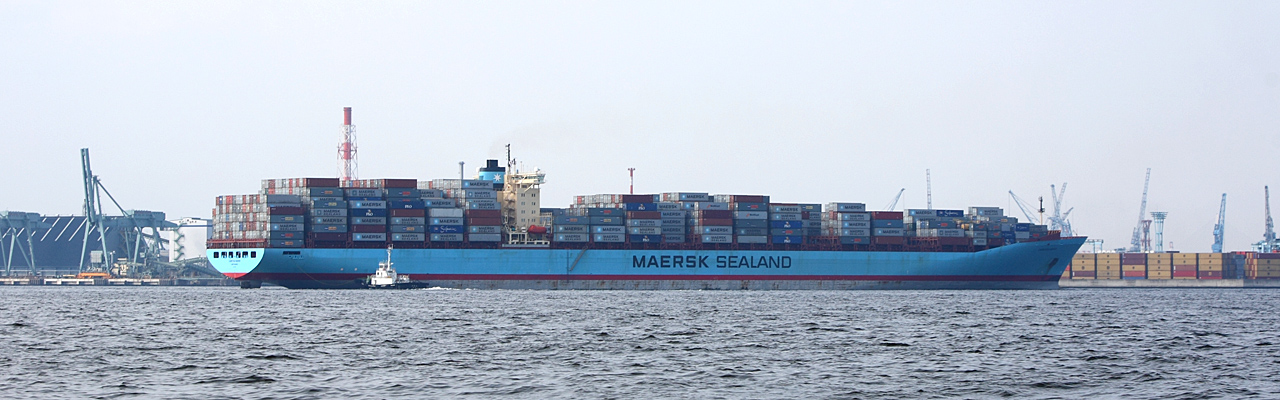
Sovereign Maersk container ship at Minami Honmoku Pier, Yokohama

Yokohama Port has ten major piers. Honmoku Pier is the port's core facility with 24 berths including 14 container berths. Osanbashi Pier handles passenger traffic including cruises, and has customs, immigration and quarantine facilities for international travel.

Detamachi, the "banana pier," is outfitted for receiving fresh fruits and vegetables. Daikoku Pier, on an artificial island measuring 321 hectares, is equipped with container logistics facilities including seven container berths and houses a million square meters of warehouse space at the Yokohama Port Cargo Center.

At Minami Honmoku, the newest facility to be developed, there are two 350 meter operational berths with a depth of 16 meters capable of handling larger post Panamax container ships with 6 mega container cranes for 22 lines of containers. Additional berths are under construction for larger ships in dimensions equal to or exceeding the size of a Mærsk E-class container ship.

Seven berths of Mizuho Pier are used by the United States Forces Japan. Additional piers handle timber and serve other functions.

== Statistics ==
In 2013, the Port of Yokohama served 37,706 ships. It handled 271,276,977 tons of cargo and 2,888,220 TEU containers. The total value of the cargo was 10,921,656 million yen.

APM Terminals Yokohama facility at Minami Honmoku was recognised in 2013 as the most productive container terminal in the world averaging 163 crane moves per hour, per ship between the vessel's arrival and departure at the berth.

== See also ==
- List of East Asian ports
- Minato Mirai 21
