= Kawajiri =

Kawajiri (written: 川尻 or 河尻) is a Japanese surname. Notable people with the surname include:

- Kawajiri Hidetaka (河尻 秀隆, 1527–1582), Japanese samurai
- Tatsuya Kawajiri (川尻 達也, born 1978), Japanese mixed martial artist
- Yoshiaki Kawajiri (川尻 善昭, born 1950), Japanese animator, anime director and screenwriter

== See also ==
- Kawajiri, Hiroshima, a former town in Toyota District, Hiroshima Prefecture, Japan
