= 2go (disambiguation) =

2go is a social networking and online dating service.

2go or 2GO may also refer to:

- 2GO Group, a major logistics and shipping company in the Philippines that offers cargo, freight, and passenger transport services
- 2GO Travel, the passenger ferry division of 2GO Group, providing ferry services to various destinations within the Philippines
- 2GO (cargo airline), a logistics and supply chain cargo airline under 2GO Group
- 2GO Maligaya, a passenger ferry owned by 2GO Group Inc, one of the largest passenger vessels in the Philippines
- 2GO Masagana, a passenger ferry owned by 2GO Group Inc., one of the largest passenger vessels in the Philippines
- 2GO Masigla, a passenger ferry owned by 2GO Group Inc
- 2GO Masinag, a passenger ferry owned by 2GO Group Inc
- 2GO Masikap, a passenger ferry owned by 2GO Group Inc
- Triple M Central Coast, Australian radio station originally 2GO
