= Mxit =

Defunct South African instant messaging platform

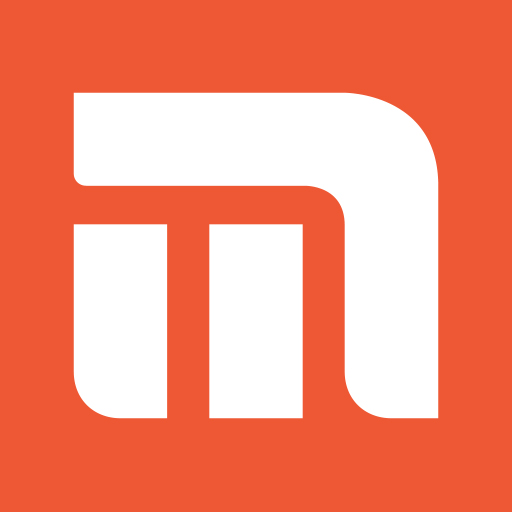
- Developer: Mxit (Pty) Ltd.
- Release: 2005
- Stable release: See → Historical last versions
- Operating system: Windows, Windows Mobile, macOS, Linux, Android, iOS, BlackBerry OS, Java ME, Symbian S60
- Type: Instant Messenger
- License: Freeware
- Website: www.mxit.com

Mxit (pronounced "mix it") was a free instant messaging application developed by Mxit (Pty) Ltd. in South Africa that ran on over 8,000 devices, including feature phones, Symbian S60, Android, BlackBerry, iPhone, iPad, Windows Phone and tablets. Led by Alan Knott-Craig Jnr, Mxit had 7.4 million monthly active subscribers in July 2013, of which 6.3 million were South Africans.

The company announced its closure in a statement on October 23, 2015. All of the company's intellectual property and technology assets were donated to The Reach Trust, an independent public benefit organisation, led by Andrew Rudge. While initially the organisational changes did not affect the mobile social network, and users were still able to access and use all its services, in September 2016 it was announced that the service would be closing on September 30.

== History ==
Mxit was founded by Herman Heunis in Stellenbosch. In 1997, Heunis established Swist Group Technologies and focused primarily on the mobile telecommunications industry, developing software and providing system support to large Telco's. In 2000 Clockspeed Mobile, a research and development division of Swist Group Technologies, developed a Massive Multiplayer Mobile game named Arya. The game was SMS based and was not successful due to the high cost of SMS since GPRS was still not widely implemented. In 2003 the game was reassessed and the MXit concept was conceived by Herman that same year, MXit has evolved to become a major IM player in the South African arena thereafter. In April 2004 Clockspeed Mobile became independent and on July 1, 2006, became MXit Lifestyle (Pty) Ltd. In January 2007, media giant Naspers acquired a 30% stake in the company for an undisclosed amount. In 2013, competitor 2go overtook Mxit in term of users across Africa.

In September 2011, Mxit was acquired by South African investment group, World of Avatar.

Following the abrupt resignation of then CEO, Alan Knott-Craig, Jr., Francois Swart received the nod from Mxit to become the new CEO (Mzekandaba, 2013).

Former First National Bank CEO Michael Jordaan was announced chairman of the Mxit board in September 2013.

The shutting down of Mxit was announced on October 23, 2015, in a public statement by the company after user numbers dropped dramatically over the last 2–3 years. Competition from other social platforms such as Blackberry Messenger, and, later, WhatsApp and Facebook Messenger along with Mxit's own lack of technological advances in the social arena attributed to the company's closure. The donating all of its intellectual property and technology assets to independent public benefit organisation The Reach Trust was announced in the statement issued by the company.

In September 2016, active users of Mxit were notified that the service would be closed on September 24.

== Features ==
Mxit was first released as a mobile phone instant messaging client, and required Java (J2ME) and internet connectivity via CSD, GPRS, 3G or Wifi to run.

Originally built for feature phones, versions were also released for BlackBerry, Android, iPhone, Windows Mobile devices and tablets.

In addition to one-on-one and group chat functions, Mxit offered public chat zones, as well as apps and a games ecosystem.

== Platforms ==
=== Supported platforms ===
Mxit was available on a variety of mobile and computing platforms, each independently developed for the platform. Those were:

- Android
- BlackBerry OS
- iOS
- Java ME
- Linux using Pidgin
- Mac OS X using Adium
- Microsoft Windows using Pidgin and MXit EVO
- Windows Phone

=== Historical last versions ===
Platform	Last version	Release date	Third party
Java ME	7.1.0	November 12, 2013	No
BlackBerry	7.0.1.389	January 27, 2014	No
iPhone	7.2.0	April 5, 2014	No
Android	7.2.1	April 23, 2014	No
Windows Phone 8	1.0.3.1	December 6, 2012	No
Windows Phone 7	1.0.3.0	May 25, 2012	No
Linux	2.9.0, Pidgin	June 23, 2011	Yes, Pidgin only, bundled plugin
Microsoft Windows	2.9.0, Pidgin; 2.0.1, MXit Evo	June 23, 2011; December 13, 2010	Yes, Pidgin, bundled plugin
Mac OS X	1.0	August 31, 2009	Yes, Adium only, separate plugin

== International presence ==
Mxit operated in many international markets. Mxit was officially supported in Malaysia, India, Indonesia, United Kingdom, United States, Nigeria, Brazil, France, Germany, Italy, Portugal, and South Africa. In August 2007 Mxit commissioned their European Data Centre located in Frankfurt, Germany. The purpose of this server farm was to take over most of the international traffic from the South African servers. In September 2010, Mxit launched in Kenya, making it the first country outside of South Africa to have access to the full range of features.

== Security ==
On November 4, 2014, Mxit scored 0 out of 7 points on the Electronic Frontier Foundation's secure messaging scorecard. It lost points because communications are not encrypted in transit, communications are not encrypted with a key the provider doesn't have access to, users can't verify contacts' identities, past messages are not secure if the encryption keys are stolen, the code is not open to independent review, the security design is not properly documented, and there has not been a recent independent code audit.
