= 2GO (cargo airline) =

Airline of the Philippines

2GO Air
IATA	ICAO	Call sign
PR	BOI	ABAIR
- Founded: January 28, 1988; 38 years ago
- Hubs: Ninoy Aquino International Airport
- Parent company: 2GO Group
- Headquarters: Parañaque, Philippines
- Website: www.2go.com.ph

2GO Air is a logistics and supply chain cargo airline based in Parañaque, Philippines. It operates bulk cargo and express parcel services throughout the Philippines. Its main base is Ninoy Aquino International Airport, Manila. 2GO is operated by the Aboitiz Air Transport Corporation the transport and logistics company owned by Aboitiz Equity Ventures.

Its parent company 2GO Group is a subsidiary of SM Investments Corporation which includes 2GO Travel and 2GO Express.

2GO does not have any aircraft but uses the hold capacity of Cebu Pacific passenger aircraft.

== Accidents ==
In 2006 a NAMC YS 11 of veered off the runway in Manila.

== See also ==
- 2GO Group
- 2go (disambiguation)

== Bibliography ==
- Günter Endres (2010). Flight International World Airlines 2010. Sutton, Surrey, England: Reed Business Information. ISBN 978-1-898779-39-1
