= 2GO Maligaya =

2003 Japanese passenger ferry ship

MV 2GO Maligaya
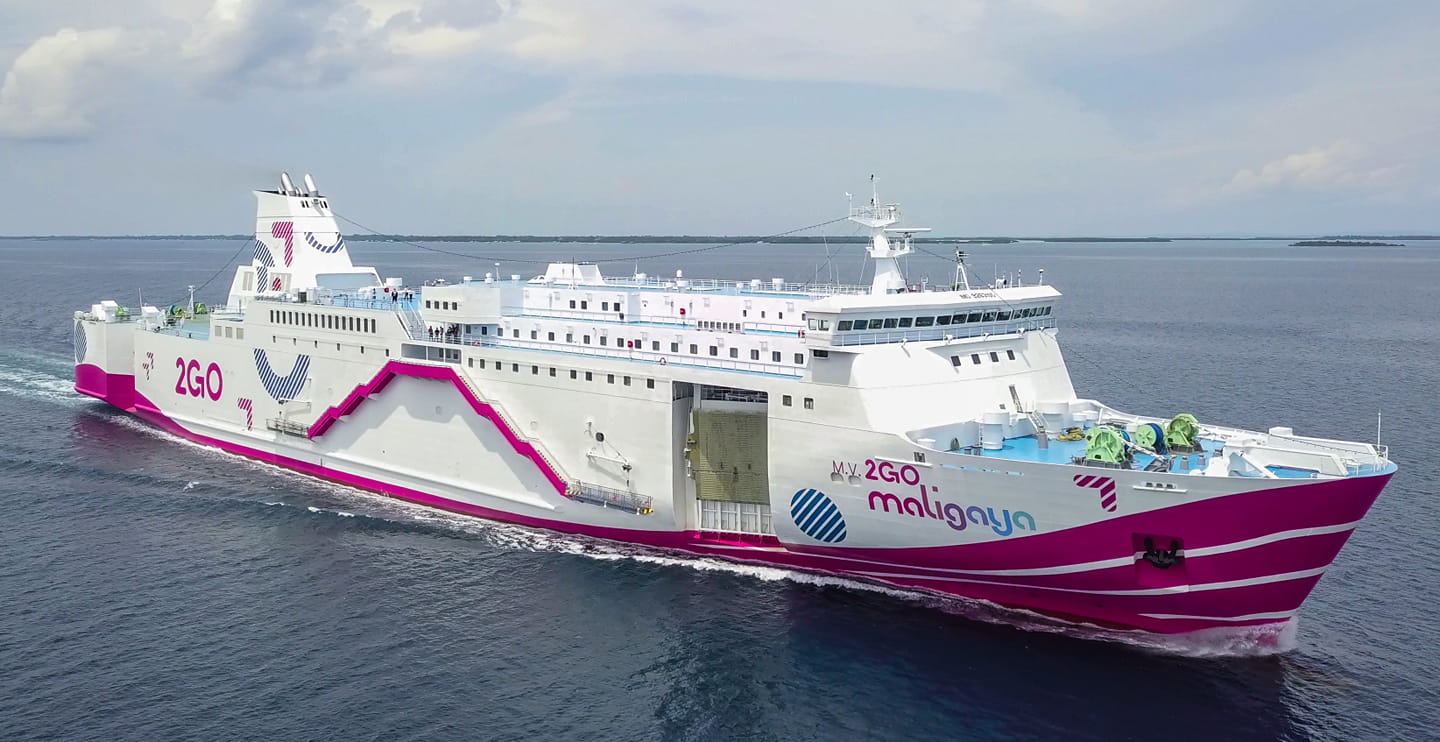

History

Japan
- Name: Yamato
- Namesake: IJN Yamato
- Owner: Hankyu Ferry
- Port of registry: Kobe, Japan
- Route: Kobe – Kitakyushu
- Builder: Mitsubishi Heavy Industries (Shimonoseki, Japan)
- Laid down: 2002
- Launched: January 2003
- Completed: March 2003
- Maiden voyage: April 2003
- In service: 2003–2020
- Out of service: March 10, 2020
- Home port: Kobe
- Identification: Call sign: DUE4337; IMO number: 9263150; MMSI number: 548168700
- Fate: Sold to Stena RORO

History

Panama
- Name: Stena Nova
- Owner: Stena AB
- Port of registry: Panama City, Panama
- Acquired: 2020
- Fate: Never entered service, sold to 2GO Group Inc.

Philippines
- Name: 2GO Maligaya
- Owner: 2GO Group
- Operator: 2GO Sea Solutions
- Port of registry: Manila, Philippines
- Route: 1. Manila - Iloilo - Bacolod - Manila (2025); 2. Manila - Bacolod - Iloilo - Cagayan de Oro - Iloilo - Manila (2026)
- Acquired: 2020
- Maiden voyage: May 30, 2021
- In service: 2021–present
- Home port: Manila, Philippines
- Fate: In active service

General characteristics
- Type: ROPAX ferry
- Tonnage: 29,046 GT
- Length: 195 m (639 ft 9 in)
- Beam: 26 m (85 ft 4 in)
- Ramps: 2
- Installed power: 2x Wärtsilä 16V38B diesel engine (20,152 kW (27,024 hp))
- Propulsion: Controllable Pitch Propeller(CPP) 2-shaft
- Speed: 23 knots (43 km/h; 26 mph) max
- Capacity: 768 passengers

MV 2GO Maligaya (MLG), also known simply as MV Maligaya, is a passenger ferry of Philippine ferry operator 2GO Travel. It originally entered service in 2003 as Yamato under Hankyu Ferry.

She is the sister ship of MV 2GO Masagana (formerly Tsukushi), which was acquired by 2GO a few months after Maligaya. The primary differences between the two sister ships are their livery designs, which feature several minor modifications and tweaks. Additionally, after 2023, MV 2GO Maligaya's third passenger deck where the sundeck area used to be, was extended.

Both she and MV 2GO Masagana are the largest passenger vessels ever to sail in the Philippines, surpassing the size of MV Princess of the Stars of Sulpicio Lines.

== Service history ==
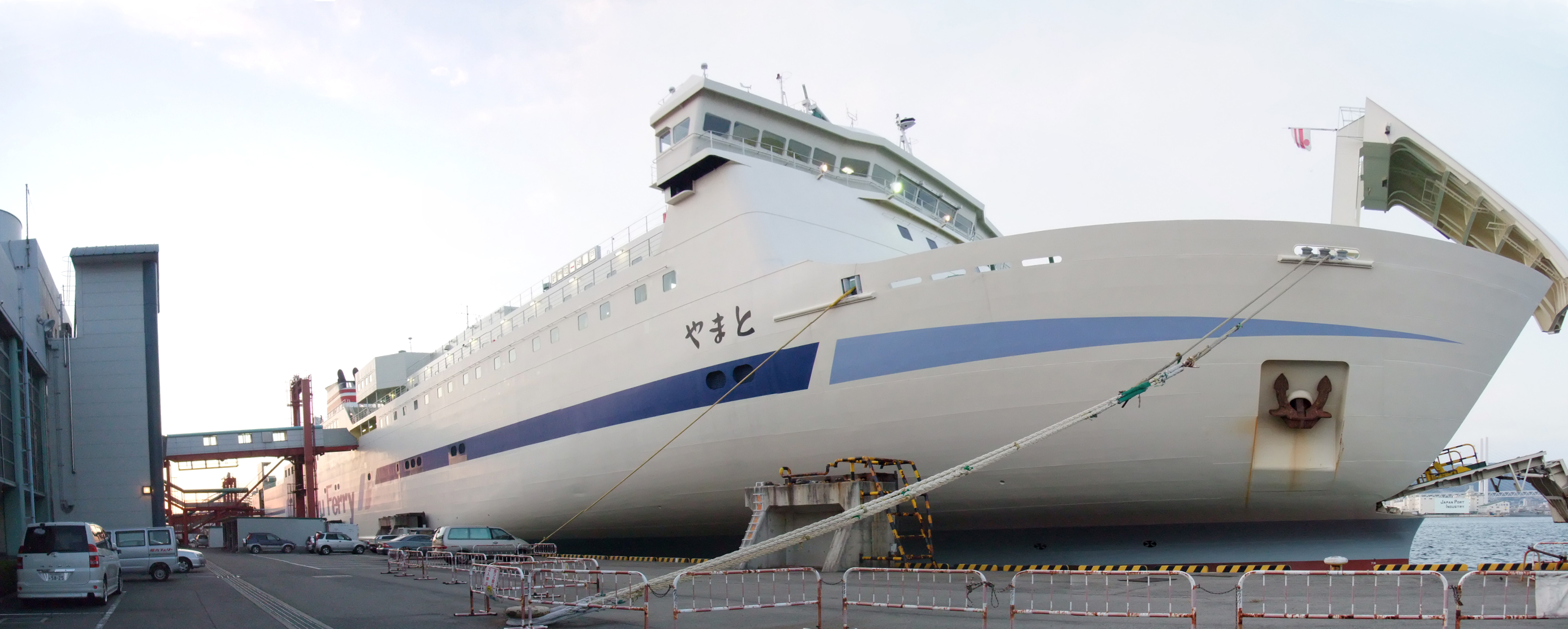
2GO Maligaya (as Yamato) when she was still in Japan

In the early 2000s, Hankyu Ferry planned to replace the sister ships New Harima and New Seto on the route between Kobe and Kitakyushu with newer and more efficient vessels.

Based on the design of the company's then-recent ships Ferry Settsu and Ferry Suō, the new vessels, later named Yamato and Tsukushi, were planned to be slightly larger. Their overall length was set at 195 meters, allowing for an increased rolling cargo capacity of approximately 229 trailers. Externally, the two ships retained the general silhouette of their predecessors, including a single funnel, but were distinguished by the absence of side ventilation openings along the upper car deck, giving the hull a more solid, continuous appearance.

The interior layout was largely derived from the earlier vessels, but incorporated several enhancements. These included an indoor sea-view promenade, a feature inspired by the ships of Shin Nihonkai Ferry, a sister company of Hankyu Ferry. Although the total passenger capacity was reduced to 667, the quality of accommodation was significantly upgraded. Notably, the public bath facilities were relocated to provide direct views of the sea.

Unlike the previous vessels in the fleet, which had been built at the Kanda Shipyards, the new ships were constructed by Mitsubishi Heavy Industries at its Shimonoseki facility. The Yamato was laid down sometime in 2002, and launched in January 2003. Following approximately three months of fitting-out work, the ship was delivered to Hankyu Ferry on March 25, 2003.

The Yamato was commissioned in April 2003 on the Kobe-Kitakyushu route, replacing the New Harima, which was sold to WG&A Philippines and became the MV SuperFerry 17. In June of the same year, it was joined by its sister ship, the Tsukushi (now MV 2GO Masagana).

In the late 2010s, Hankyu Ferry continued its fleet renewal plan, which had begun in 2015 with the introduction of the sister ships Izumi and Hibiki, by ordering a new pair of car ferries intended to replace the Yamato and Tsukushi. In anticipation of the arrival of these new vessels, the Yamato was sold on February 15, 2019, to Stena RoRo, a subsidiary of the Swedish shipping company Stena Line, but continued operating under Hankyu Ferry until March 10, 2020, when after nearly 17 years of service without notable incidents, the Yamato completed its final crossing for Hankyu Ferry. It was subsequently replaced in the fleet by the newly delivered Settsu. On March 22, she was transferred to Stena RoRo and renamed Stena Nova, sailing under the flag of Panama.

The ship was originally intended to be offered for charter in the European market in 2020, following renovation work in Perama, Greece, due to a shortage of vessels in Europe at that time. Stena planned to make her available after extensive modification work to bring her up to European standards.

Stena RoRo proposed a number of different conversion options for the ship, including as a day ferry, night ferry, or Ro-Pax. Plans for a possible conversion into a hospital ship are also known to have been drawn up. The ship was offered for either sale or charter in converted or unconverted state. During this period, rumors circulated that Stena Nova would be chartered by Corsica Ferries as early as 2021, although neither Corsica Ferries nor Stena RoRo issued any official confirmation.

However, Stena's plans were disrupted by the rapid spread of the COVID-19 pandemic across Europe. Although the ship departed Japan on 14 March 2020, the situation continued to worsen. The vessel first drew public attention in the Philippines when it was detained in Subic Bay on April 22, 2020, before eventually being relocated to Brunei Bay in Malaysia in July, foreshadowing its future service in the Philippines.

Due to growing uncertainties and delays caused by the pandemic, Stena RoRo ultimately cancelled its conversion project in mid-2020. The vessel was then laid up in Brunei Bay while awaiting potential buyers.

In March 2021, Stena RoRo announced the sale of the ship to 2GO Group. The vessel, still named Stena Nova at the time, departed Brunei Bay on March 5, 2021, and arrived in Manila on March 9, 2021.

Upon returning to the Philippines for the second time, the ship proceeded to Manila Bay, where she remained at anchor until March 17. She was then taken to a dry dock in Bauan, Batangas to be refitted to the standards of her new operator, 2GO Travel. The vessel underwent relatively few modifications, with the most notable being the installation of two side ramps on the starboard side and a welded external staircase. After the refit, she was officially launched as 2GO Maligaya and re-registered in Manila as the largest ship of the fleet, and became the flagship of 2GO Travel.

As the fleet's flagship, her maiden voyage under 2GO colors took place on May 30, 2021, serving the premier Manila - Cebu - Cagayan de Oro route. A few months later, her sister ship, 2GO Masagana: (ex-Tsukushi), joined the fleet and eventually took over this route, making her sister the new flagship of the fleet.

Since then, 2GO Maligaya has been deployed to several major routes across the Philippines. She is currently assigned to the Manila - Bacolod - Iloilo - Cagayan de Oro, and the Manila - Iloilo - Bacolod routes.

In 2023, during her drydocking, the ship's third passenger deck was extended to increase passenger capacity, and an escalator was installed to make boarding easier and more efficient.

In 2025, the ship's gangplank was modified and reoriented.

== Onboard ==
2GO Maligaya has a total of eight accessible decks, although the vessel structurally spans ten decks. Decks 1 to 4 serve as car decks for rolling cargo. Passenger accommodations are located on Decks 5, 6, and 7, while crew quarters are situated forward on Deck 7 and aft on Deck 5.

=== Accommodations ===
- Business Class for 2
- Business Class for 4
- Stateroom
- Mega Value Class
- Tourist Class

=== Amenities ===
- Horizon Cafe
- Island Fiesta
- Cafe 2GO
- Front Desk
- KTV
- Main Lobby
- Sea breeze
- Sundeck

== See also ==
- 2GO Masagana
- 2GO Masinag
- 2GO Masikap
- 2GO Masigla
