= 2GO Masinag =

Vessel built in 2002

MV 2GO Masinag
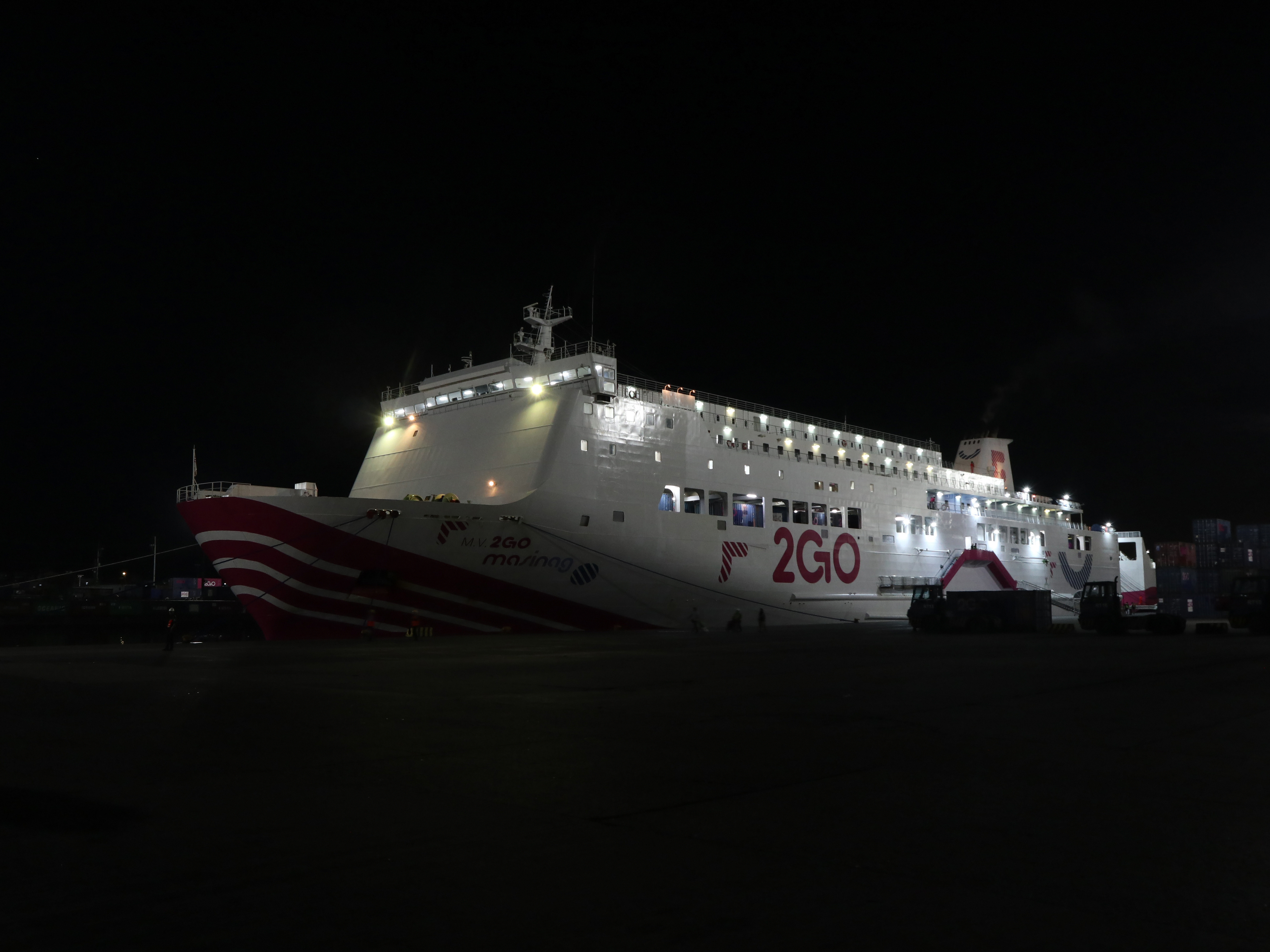
- M/V 2GO Masinag at night moored at Pier 4, Manila North Harbor.

History

Japan
- Name: Ferry Fukuoka 2; Ferry Fukouka II
- Owner: Meimon Taiyō Ferry Co., Ltd. (Cityline)
- Port of registry: Osaka, Japan
- Route: Osaka - Kitakyushu
- Builder: Mitsubishi Heavy Industries (Shimonoseki, Japan)
- Way number: 1087
- Laid down: November 2001
- Launched: June 14, 2002
- Maiden voyage: October 18, 2002
- In service: 2002–2022
- Out of service: March 27, 2022
- Home port: Osaka, Japan
- Identification: Call sign: 4DJM6; IMO number: 9258416; MMSI number: 548401900
- Fate: Sold to Seaworld Express Ferry

South Korea
- Name: Queen Mary 2
- Owner: Seaworld Express Ferry
- Operator: Seaworld Express Ferry
- Port of registry: Busan, South Korea
- Route: Busan - Jeju
- Acquired: 2022
- Maiden voyage: 2022
- In service: 2022–2023
- Out of service: 2023
- Home port: Busan, South Korea
- Fate: Sold to 2GO Group

Philippines
- Name: 2GO Masinag
- Owner: 2GO Group
- Operator: 2GO Sea Solutions
- Port of registry: Manila, Philippines
- Route: 1. Manila - Cebu - Manila (2025); 2. Manila - Davao - GenSan - Iloilo - Manila (2025); 3. Manila - GenSan - Davao - Cebu - Manila (2025)
- Acquired: 2023
- Maiden voyage: 2024
- In service: 2024–present
- Home port: Manila, Philippines
- Fate: In active service

General characteristics
- Type: ROPAX ferry
- Tonnage: 9,975 GT
- Length: 167 m (547 ft 11 in)
- Beam: 27 m (88 ft 7 in)
- Depth: 14 m (45 ft 11 in)
- Ramps: 1
- Installed power: 2 × Pielstick/NKK 18-cylinder 18PC2-6V diesel engines (19,860 kW (26,630 hp))
- Propulsion: Controllable Pitch Propeller(CPP) 2-shaft
- Speed: 21 knots (39 km/h; 24 mph) max
- Capacity: 732
- Crew: 26

MV 2GO Masinag (MNG), commonly known as MV Masinag, is a passenger ferry operated by the Philippine company 2GO Group. The ship originally entered service in 2002 as Ferry Fukuoka II in Japan with Meimon Taiyo Ferry.

MV 2GO Masinag is the sister ship of MV 2GO Masikap (formerly Ferry Kyoto II), which was acquired by 2GO a few months earlier in 2023. The main difference between the two vessels is that MV 2GO Masikap, during her time under Hanil Car Express Ferry, had been refitted with a two-piece cargo ramp at the portside quarter aft area. In contrast, MV 2GO Masinag retained the original aft ramp from Japan. The passenger gangplank and quarter aft portside ramp were added upon her arrival in the Philippines.

The ship also serves as the successor to the former 2GO Travel vessel MV St. Therese of the Child Jesus (STCJ / formerly Ferry Fukuoka).

== History ==
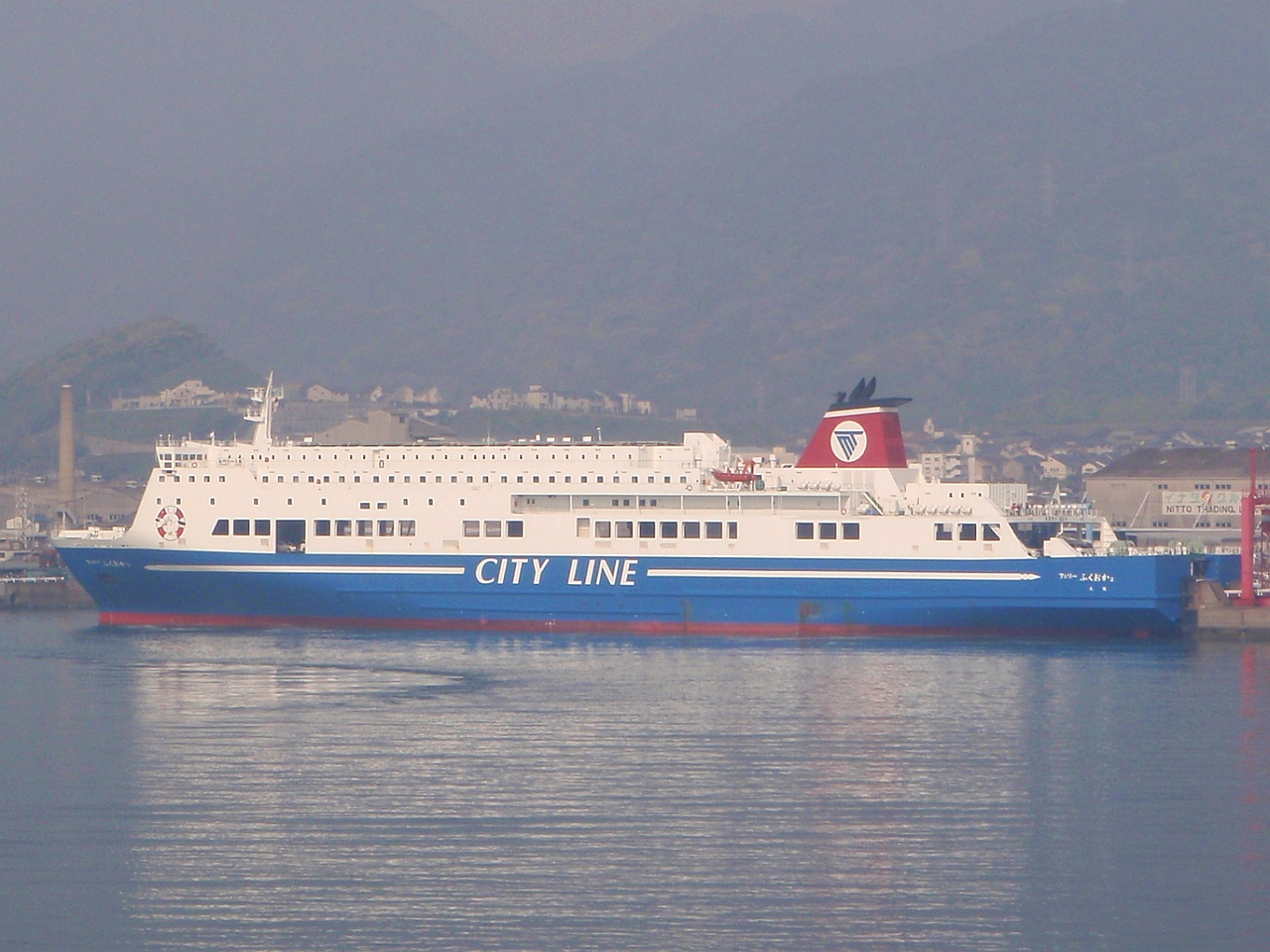
2GO Masinag as Ferry Fukuoka II when she was still in Japan

In the early 2000s, Meimon Taiyo Ferry sought to standardize the quality of service on its Osaka-Kyushu routes. Although the sister ships Ferry Kyoto (later SuperFerry 15) and Ferry Fukuoka (later SuperFerry 16 / St. Therese of the Child Jesus) entered service in 1989, they no longer matched the comfort level of the newer ships, Ferry Osaka and Ferry Kitakyushu. To maintain a uniform standard across the fleet, the company decided to construct a new pair of ships.

Based on the design of Ferry Osaka and Ferry Kitakyushu, the new vessel retained key elements such as the single funnel and a similar interior layout. With a length of 167 meters, was larger than her predecessors, though with a slightly smaller passenger capacity. Her propulsion system incorporated updated shipbuilding standards, achieving a 19% reduction in CO2 emissions. She was also among the first passenger ships in Japan to be equipped with facilities designed to assist passengers with reduced mobility, improving accessibility on board.

Ferry Fukuoka 2 was ordered from Mitsubishi Heavy Industries in Shimonoseki and was laid down on November 12, 2001, a few weeks after her sister ship. She was jointly built with the Japan Railway Construction, Transport and Technology Agency, and was launched on June 14, 2002 and, after three and a half months of sea trials, was delivered to Meimon Taiyo Ferry in October 2002.

Ferry Fukuoka 2 entered service on October 18, 2002, operating on the Osaka-Kitakyushu route. It joined its sister ship, Ferry Kyoto II (later 2GO Masikap), which had been introduced the previous month. The vessel replaced the original Ferry Fukuoka in the fleet, and also took over the early evening departures previously operated by Ferry Kitakyushu.

In 2005, she underwent remodeling which included the addition of a second-class Western-style cabin and a first-class Western-style cabin on the starboard bow. The ship was also built to be barrier-free, with multi-purpose toilets and elevators installed for improved accessibility.

At the end of 2015, following the introduction of Ferry Kitakyushu II, the vessel was reassigned to the late afternoon departures, replacing the earlier Ferry Kitakyushu. In conjunction with the entry of the new ships into service, the numeric notation in her name was changed from Arabic numerals to Roman numerals.

In 2022, she was retired and replaced by a new vessel bearing the same name, Ferry Fukuoka. She was then acquired by South Korean operator Seaworld Express Ferry Co., Ltd., and renamed Queen Mary 2 (not to be confused with Cunard Line's RMS Queen Mary 2). During this period, she received extensive interior upgrades. About a year later in 2024, the ship was decommissioned with the launch of her replacement, Queen Jenuvia II.

2GO Travel has been on a “buying spree” since SM Investments took full ownership of the company in 2023. As part of this fleet expansion, the company negotiated the acquisition of both sister ships (formerly Blue Pearl and Queen Mary 2). The first to arrive in the Philippines was the ex-Blue Pearl, now MV 2GO Masikap/Magalang, followed by the ex-Queen Mary 2, now MV 2GO Masinag.

After her turnover from her previous operator in early 2024, MV 2GO Masinag proceeded directly to a floating drydock in Mokpo, South Korea for drydocking and repainting. She departed Mokpo around April 18, 2024, completing a three-day voyage to the Philippines and arriving on April 21, where she was anchored off the coast of Cavite. After her arrival in the Philippines, further refitting and modifications were carried out in Subic Bay, which included the installation of a side ramp on the port side and a welded external staircase.

She is the fifth vessel—alongside her sister ship MV 2GO Masikap—to join the “M Series” fleet acquired under SM Investments’ ownership. Despite the arrival of three new liners (Masikap, Masigla, and Masinag), MV 2GO Maligaya and MV 2GO Masagana remain the largest and longest vessels in the 2GO fleet.

== Onboard ==
MV 2GO Masinag has a total of eight operational decks. Although the vessel structurally spans ten decks, two of them are not in use as car decks to accommodate cargo onboard. Passenger accommodations are located on Decks 5, 6, and 7, while crew quarters are situated forward on Deck 7. Car decks occupy Decks 1 through 4.

=== Accommodations ===
- Business Class for 1
- Business Class for 2
- Business Class for 4
- Stateroom for 2
- Suiteroom for 2
- VIP Suiteroom
- Mega Value Class
- Tourist Class

=== Amenities ===
- Horizon Cafe
- Island Fiesta
- Cafe 2GO
- Front Desk
- Main Lobby
- Miniso and Kultura
- Watsons and ShipMart
- Salon
- Pet Room
- Massage Chairs
- Sundeck

=== Images ===
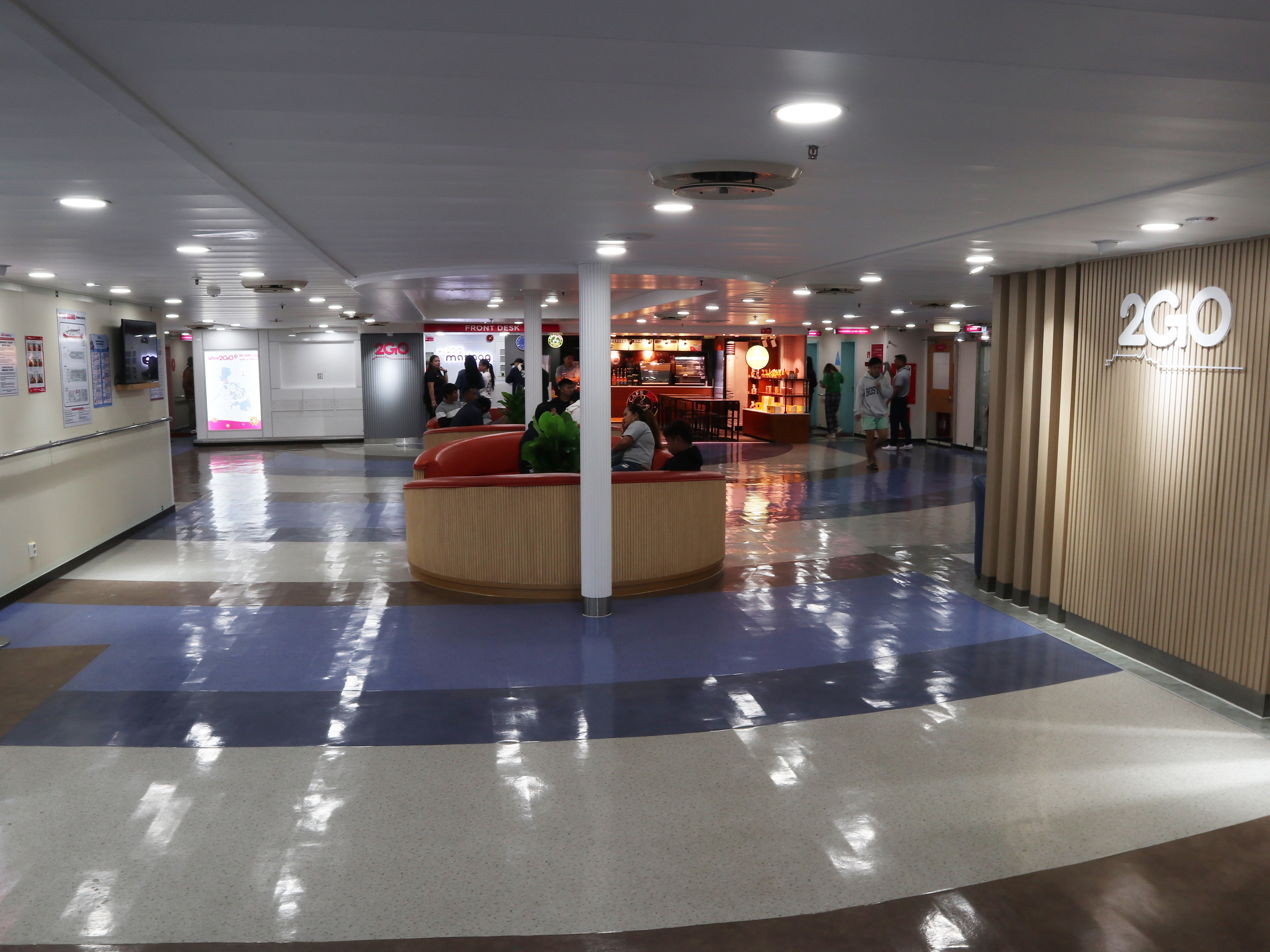
Main lobby

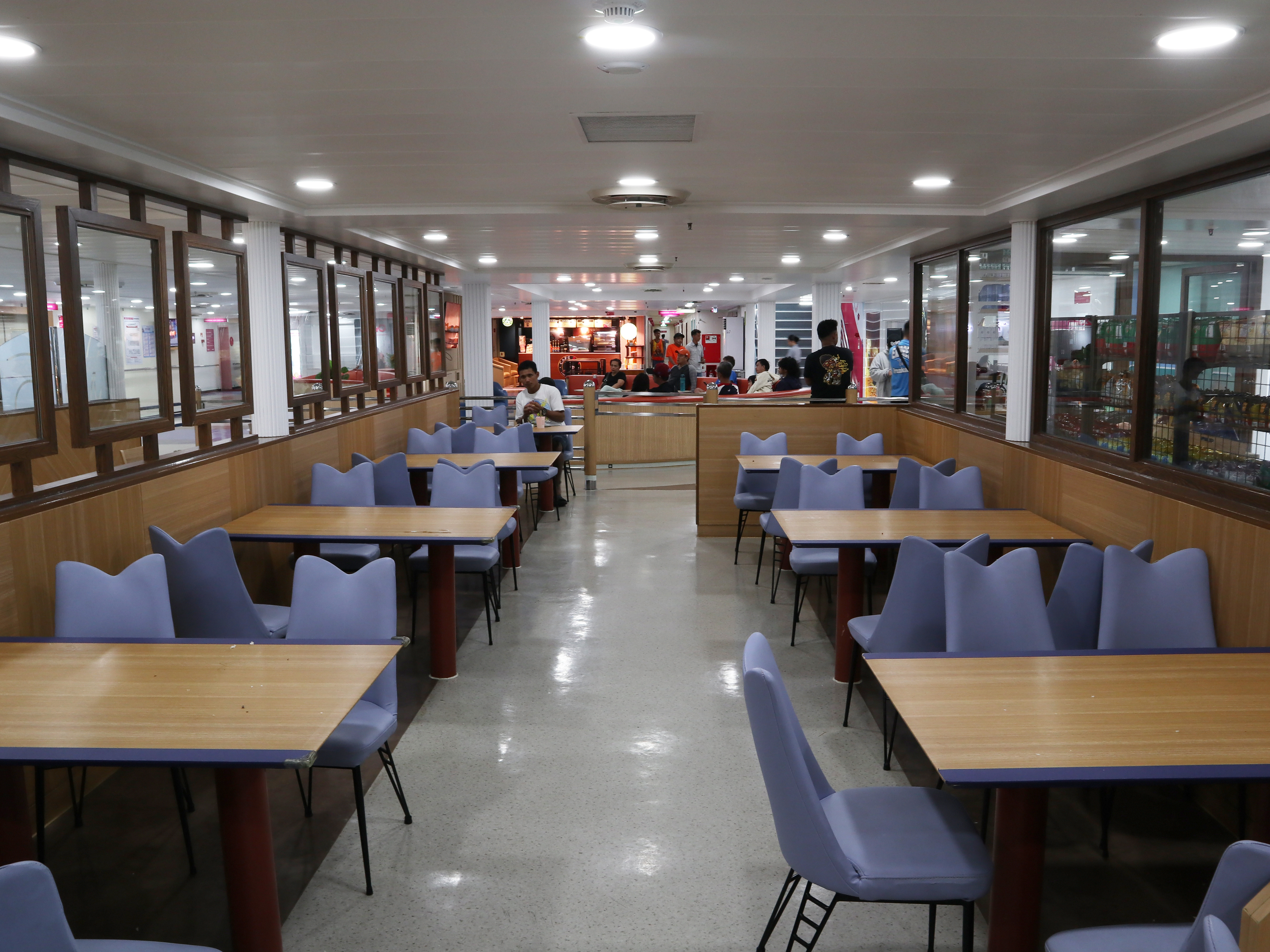
Island Fiesta

== Accidents and incidents ==
=== Collision with a cargo ship ===
On August 30, 2004, as Typhoon Chaba approached, the Ferry Fukuoka 2, which had sought refuge in the Hiuchi Nada Sea in the Seto Inland Sea, dragged its anchor and collided with the cargo ship Century Hope, also taking refuge there. The Ferry Fukuoka 2 was monitoring for anchor dragging using radar and GPS but had not kept its engines ready. When the anchor began to drag at 9:10 PM, the ship was swept away as it could not use its engines to prevent the drift.

The Century Hope noticed the Ferry Fukuoka 2 drifting and tried to warn it with whistles and searchlights. Despite reversing its engines fully, the Century Hope was struck at 9:19 PM when the Ferry Fukuoka 2's port stern collided with its bow. The Ferry Fukuoka 2 sustained damage to its port rear hull and a bent propeller, while the Century Hope suffered damage to its bulbous bow and bow shell.

=== Collision with Ferry Kitakyushu ===
On January 7, 2007, while docking at the Nanko Ferry Terminal at the Port of Osaka, the Ferry Fukuoka 2 was pushed away by strong winds and collided with the Ferry Kitakyushu, docked at the neighboring berth. At the time, winds reaching a maximum speed of 21.5 meters per second were blowing from the west.

Despite using its engine, bow thruster, and assistance from a tugboat, the Ferry Fukuoka 2 was pushed off course by the strong wind hitting its starboard stern. As a result, the center of its port side struck the starboard stern of the Kitakyushu, causing damage to the outer plating and fenders of both vessels.

=== Contact with buoy on the west side of Akashi Strait ===
On the evening of March 18, 2018, at around 7:35 PM, the Ferry Fukuoka II collided with an 8-ton buoy on the west side of the Akashi Strait. According to the Kobe Coast Guard, the ferry had departed Osaka South Port at 5 PM, heading to Shin-Moji Port in Kitakyushu, Fukuoka Prefecture, carrying 509 passengers and crew.

Before the collision, a passenger had fallen seriously ill, prompting the Himeji Coast Guard Office to dispatch the patrol boat Nunobiki to transfer the person for medical attention. While the ferry was stationary without dropping anchor during the transfer, its starboard stern came into contact with the buoy. Although no injuries occurred, part of the starboard propeller was suspected to be damaged, rendering the ferry unable to navigate.

Early on March 19, the anchor-lifting ship Oyashio from Fukada Salvage arrived to assist. Divers discovered that the buoy’s anchor chain had become entangled in the starboard propeller. They cut the chain, and by 3 PM, the ferry was able to proceed using only the port propeller, which was less affected. The ferry began its return to Osaka Nanko Port, and with tugboat support, it docked after 6 PM, 25 hours after its initial departure.

The ferry operator announced refunds for all passenger fares and compensation of 15,000 yen (96 US Dollar) per person. The Japan Transport Safety Board dispatched a marine accident investigator on March 19 to determine the cause of the incident. All sailings of the Ferry Fukuoka II were canceled from March 19 onward due to necessary repairs for the damaged starboard propeller.

== See also ==
- 2GO Maligaya
- 2GO Masagana
- 2GO Masikap
- 2GO Masigla
