= 2GO Masagana =

2003 Japanese passenger ferry ship

MV 2GO Masagana
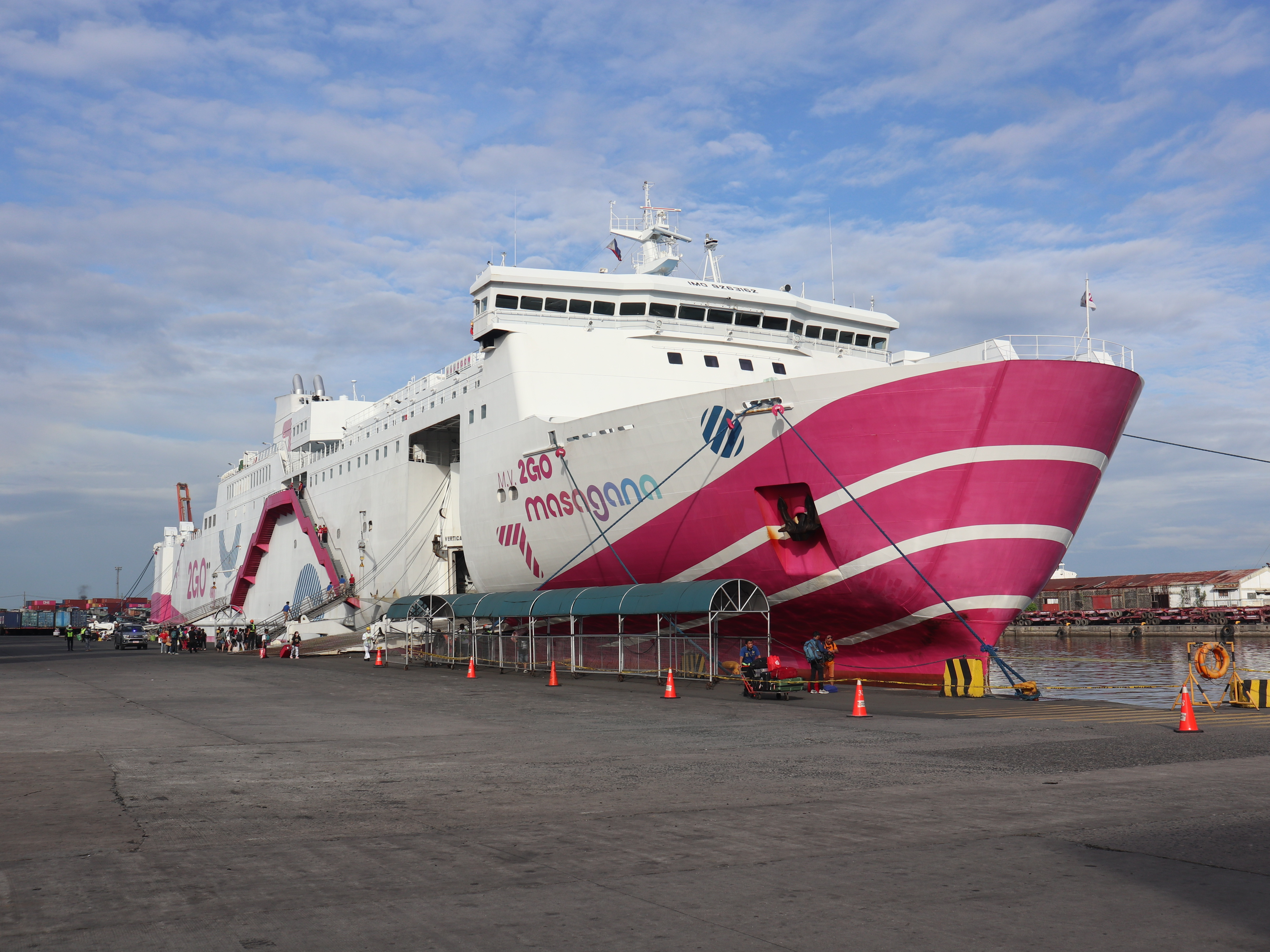

History

Japan
- Name: Tsukushi
- Owner: Hankyu Ferry
- Port of registry: Kobe, Japan
- Route: Kobe – Kitakyushu
- Builder: Mitsubishi Heavy Industries (Shimonoseki, Japan)
- Laid down: 2002
- Launched: February 20, 2003
- Completed: May 2003
- Maiden voyage: June 2003
- In service: 2003–2021
- Out of service: March 22, 2021
- Identification: Call sign: DUE4346; IMO number: 9263162; MMSI number: 548286700
- Fate: Sold to 2GO Group

Philippines
- Name: MV 2GO Masagana
- Owner: 2GO Group
- Operator: 2GO Travel
- Port of registry: Manila, Philippines
- Route: Manila - Cebu - Cagayan De Oro - Cebu - Manila (2026)
- Acquired: 2021
- Maiden voyage: August 1, 2021
- In service: 2021–present
- Home port: Manila, Philippines
- Fate: In active service

General characteristics
- Class & type: ROPAX ferry
- Tonnage: 29,046 GT
- Length: 195.0 m (639 ft 9 in)
- Beam: 26.4 m (86 ft 7 in)
- Draft: 6.87 m (22 ft 6 in)
- Ramps: 2
- Installed power: 2x Wärtsilä 16V38B diesel engine (20,152 kW (27,024 hp))
- Propulsion: Controllable Pitch Propeller(CPP) 2-shaft
- Speed: 23 knots (43 km/h; 26 mph) max
- Capacity: 667 passengers
- Crew: 33

2GO Masagana is a passenger ferry and flagship of the Philippine shipping company 2GO Travel that went into service in 2003. She was originally known as Tsukushi of Hankyu Ferry.

She is the sister ship of MV 2GO Maligaya, formerly Yamato, also from Hankyu Ferry. She was acquired by 2GO a few months after 2GO Maligaya. The difference between the two sister ships is on livery design, which has a few modifications and tweaks. In 2023, her sister MV 2GO Maligaya, had her sundeck area expanded for more accommodations, while she retained her original sundeck.

She and her sister ship are the largest passenger vessels ever to sail in the Philippines, surpassing MV Princess of the Stars of Sulpicio Lines.

== Service history ==
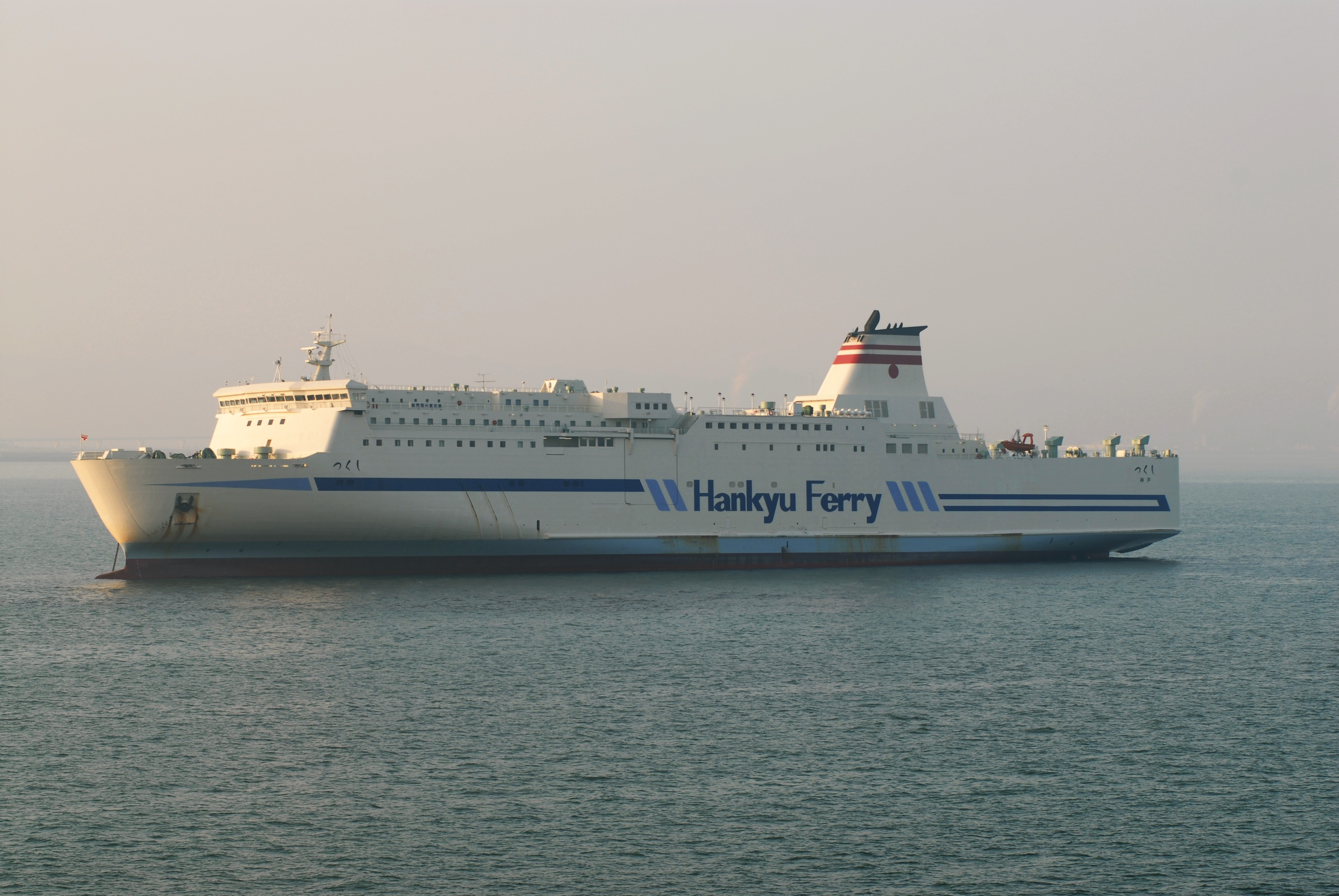
MV 2GO Masagana as Tsukushi when she was still in Japan.

In the early 2000s, Hankyu Ferry planned to replace the sister ships New Harima and New Seto on the route between Kobe and Kitakyushu with newer and more efficient vessels.

Based on the design of the company's then-recent ships Ferry Settsu and Ferry Suō, the new vessels, later named Yamato and Tsukushi, were planned to be slightly larger. Their overall length was set at 195 meters, allowing for an increased rolling cargo capacity of approximately 229 trailers. Externally, the two ships retained the general silhouette of their predecessors, including a single funnel, but were distinguished by the absence of side ventilation openings along the upper car deck, giving the hull a more solid, continuous appearance.

The interior layout was largely derived from the earlier vessels, but incorporated several enhancements. These included an indoor sea-view promenade, a feature inspired by the ships of Shin Nihonkai Ferry, a sister company of Hankyu Ferry. Although the total passenger capacity was reduced to 667, the quality of accommodation was significantly upgraded. Notably, the public bath facilities were relocated to provide direct views of the sea.

Unlike the previous vessels in the fleet, which had been built at the Kanda Shipyards, the new ships were constructed by Mitsubishi Heavy Industries at its Shimonoseki facility. The Tsukushi was laid down sometime in 2002, and was launched in February 2003. Following approximately three months of fitting-out work, the ship was delivered to Hankyu Ferry on June that same year.

The Tsukushi was commissioned in June 2003 on the Kobe-Kitakyushu route, replacing the New Seto, which was sold to WG&A Philippines and became the MV SuperFerry 18, joining her sister ship, the Yamato (now MV 2GO Maligaya).

In the late 2010s, Hankyu Ferry continued its fleet renewal plan, which had begun in 2015 with the introduction of the sister ships Izumi and Hibiki, by ordering a new pair of car ferries intended to replace the Yamato and Tsukushi.

Unlike her sister, which was no longer in service and was sold off in 2020, she became a relief ship for the company during the pandemic. When both the Settsu and the 3rd gen Yamato finally arrived, the Tsukushi still served the company for a while until it eventually completed its final crossing for Hankyu Ferry on March 22, 2021, and was put up for sale. In May 2021, the vessel was sold to the Philippine shipping company 2GO Group, which had already acquired her sister ship Yamato several months earlier. The ship was renamed as MV 2GO Masagana, and she was assigned to the Manila - Cebu - Cagayan de Oro route, taking the flagship title from her sister.

In 2023, during her drydock, an escalator was added to make boarding much easier and efficient.

In 2026, the ship's gangplank was modified and reoriented, the same with her sister a year earlier.

== Onboard ==
2GO Masagana has a total of eight accessible decks, although the vessel structurally spans ten decks. Decks 1 to 4 serve as car decks for rolling cargo. Passenger accommodations are located on Decks 5, 6, and 7, while crew quarters are situated forward on Deck 7 and aft on Deck 5.

=== Accommodations ===
- Business Class for 2
- Business Class for 4
- Stateroom for 2
- Mega Value Class
- Tourist Class

=== Amenities ===
- Horizon Cafe
- Island Fiesta
- Cafe 2GO
- Front Desk
- KTV
- Kultura
- Main Lobby
- Miniso
- Sea breeze
- Sundeck

=== Images ===
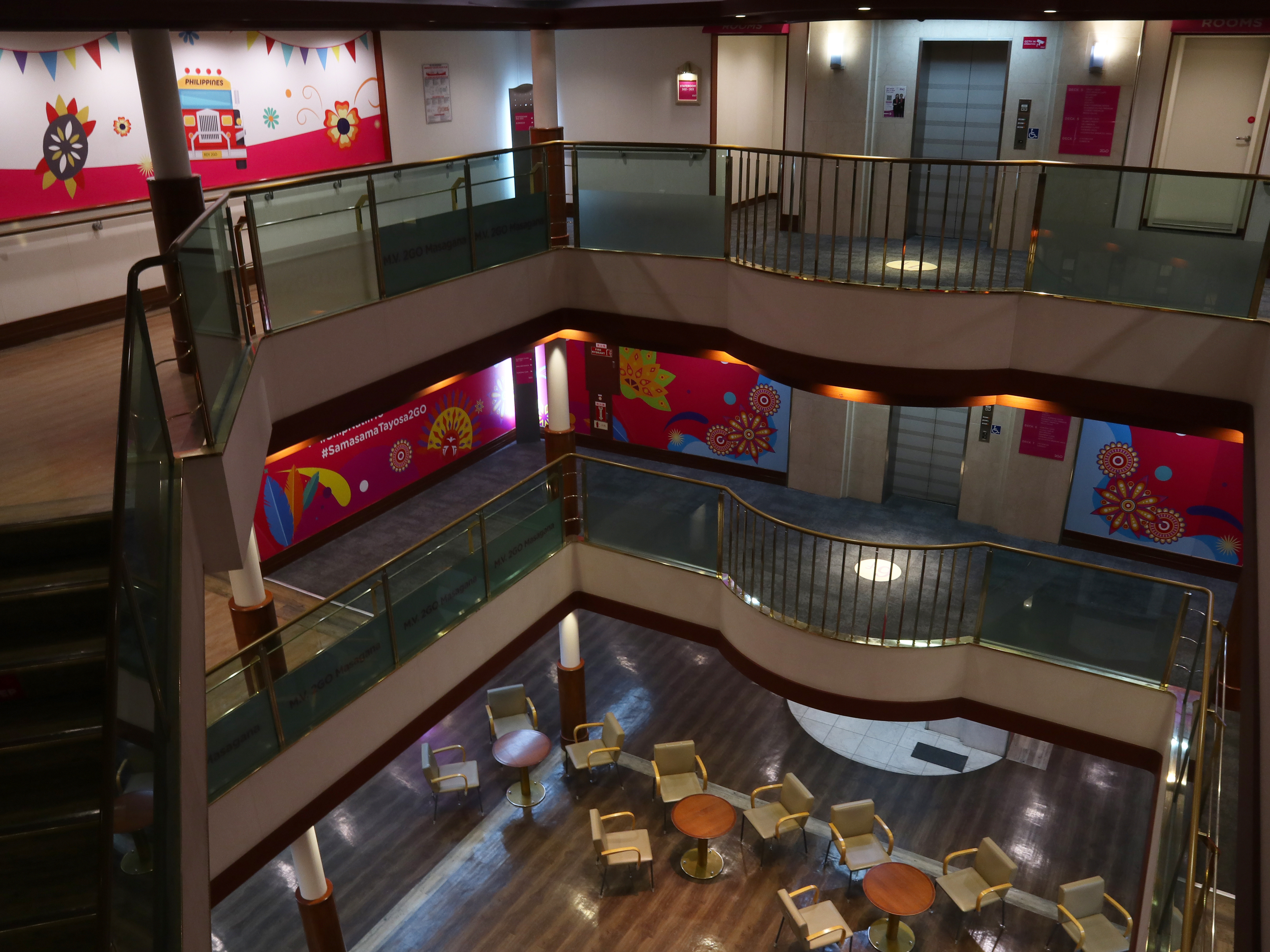
Main lobby

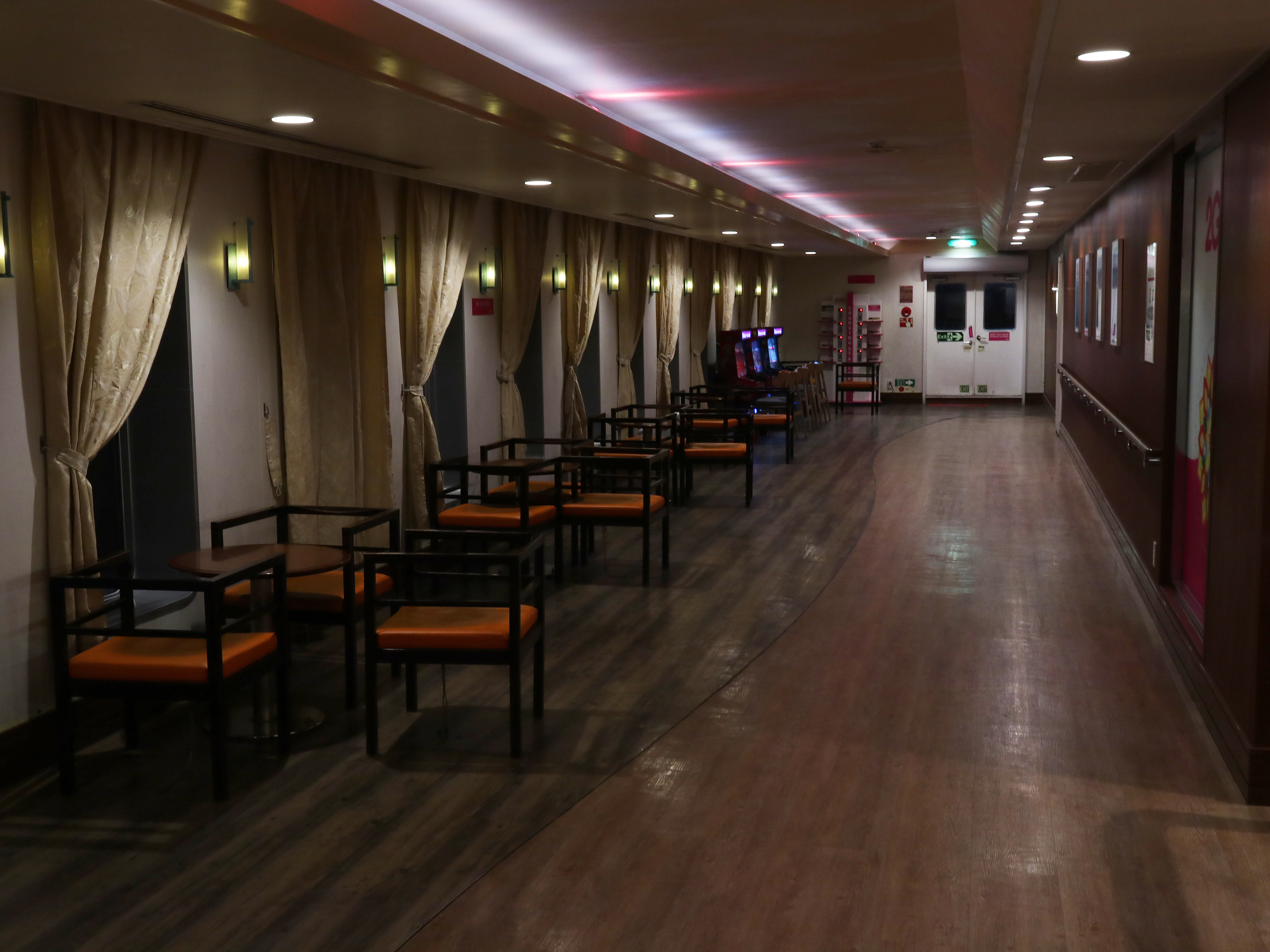
Sea breeze

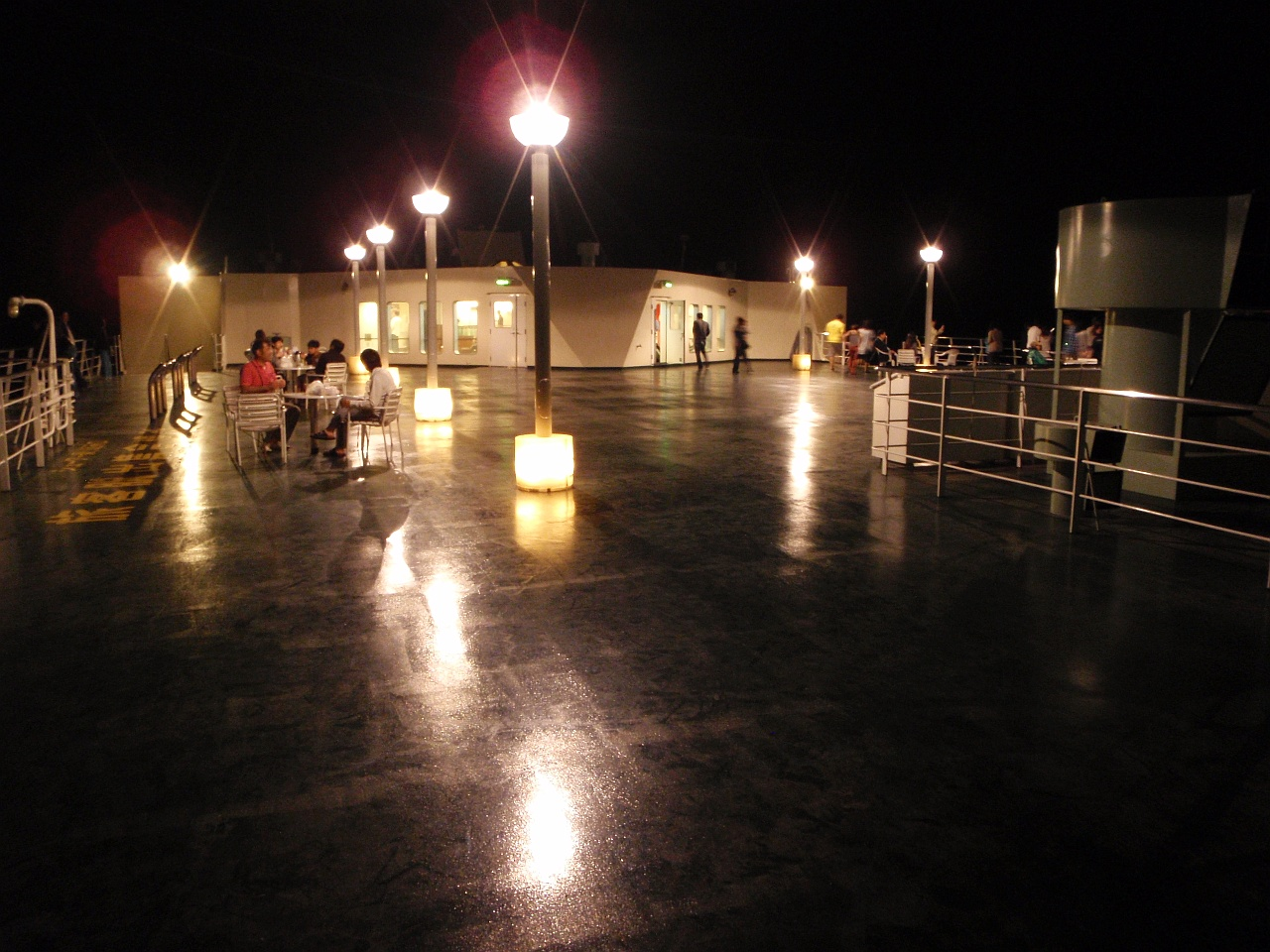
Sundeck

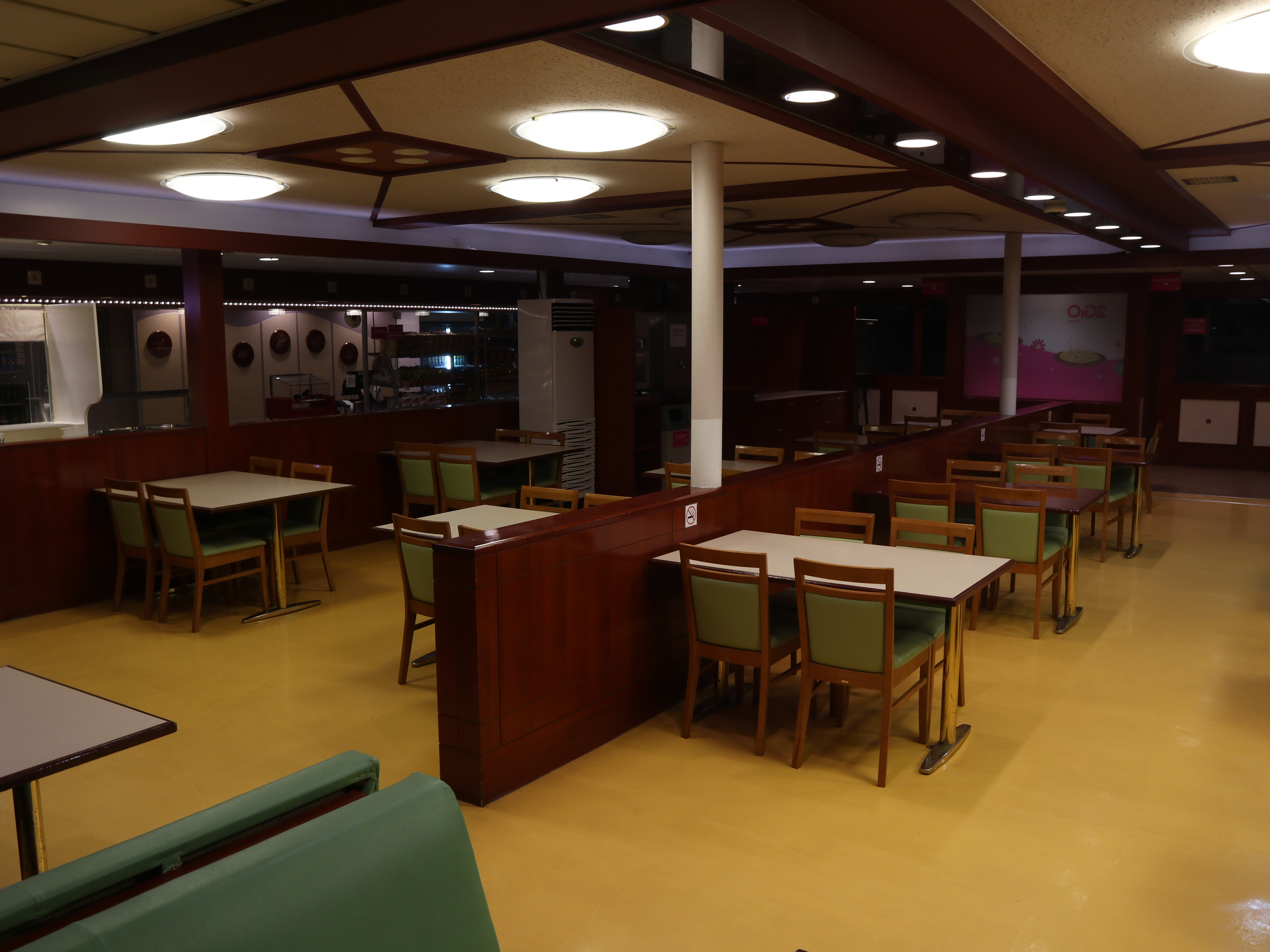
Island Fiesta

== See also ==
- 2GO Maligaya
- 2GO Masinag
- 2GO Masikap
- 2GO Masigla
