= Japanese ship Yamato =

Two ships in service with the Imperial Japanese Navy were named Yamato:

- Japanese corvette Yamato, was a Katsuragi-class corvette, launched in 1885, decommissioned in 1935 and sank in 1945.
- Japanese battleship Yamato, was the lead ship of her class of battleships, launched in 1940 and sunk in 1945

== See also ==
- Yamato-class battleship
- Yamato (disambiguation)
