= 2GO Masikap =

Passenger ferry built in 2002

MV 2GO Masikap
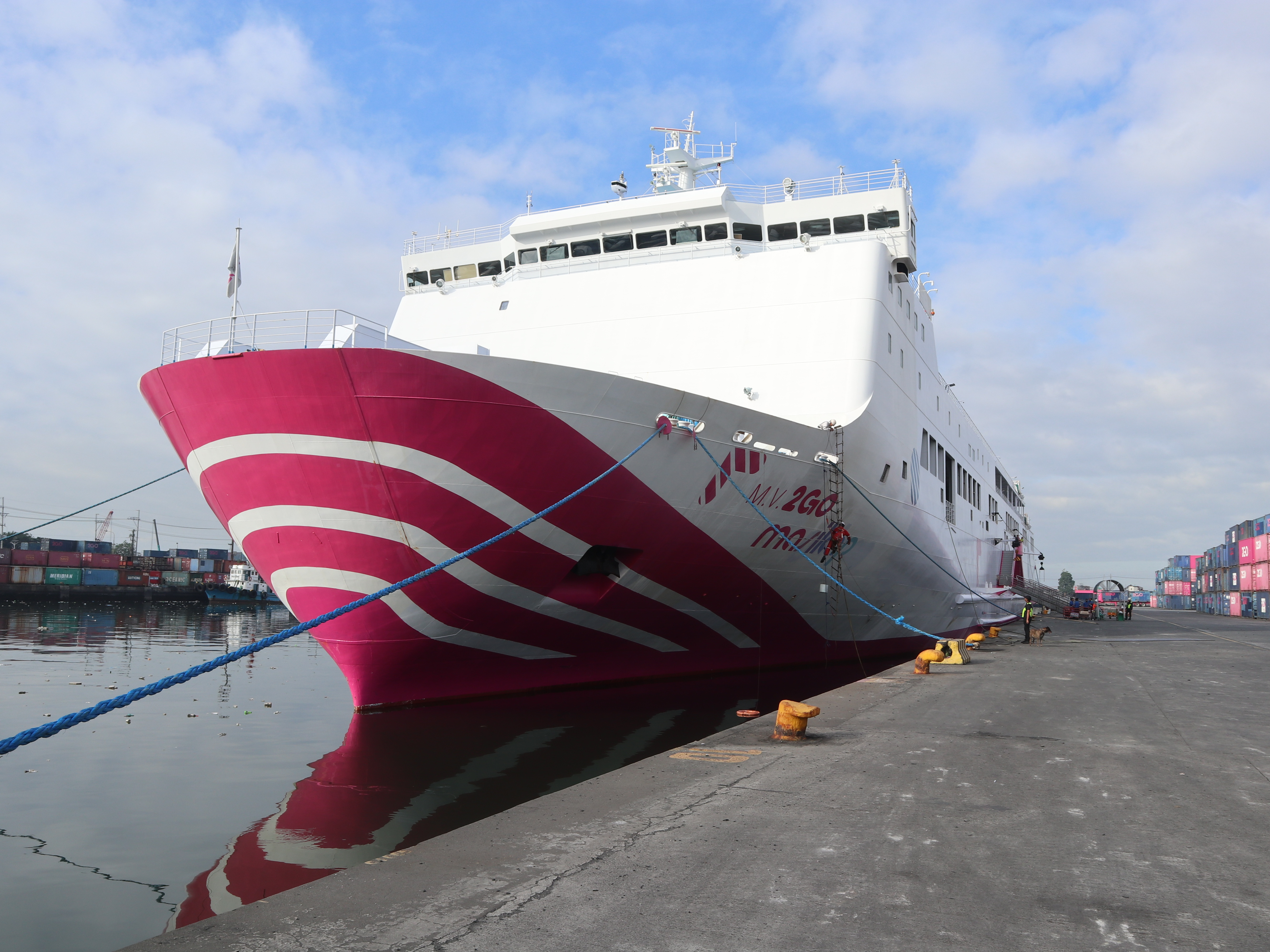
- M/V 2GO Masikap moored at Pier 4, Manila North Harbor.

History

Japan
- Name: Ferry Kyoto 2; Ferry Kyoto II
- Owner: Meimon Taiyō Ferry Co., Ltd. (Cityline)
- Port of registry: Osaka, Japan
- Route: Osaka - Kitakyushu
- Builder: Mitsubishi Heavy Industries (Shimonoseki, Japan)
- Way number: 1086
- Laid down: October 2001
- Launched: September 3, 2002
- Completed: August 31, 2002
- In service: 2002–2022
- Out of service: January 14, 2022
- Home port: Osaka, Japan
- Identification: Call sign: 4DJL5; IMO number: 9258404; MMSI number: 548292900
- Fate: Sold to Hanil Express Ferry

South Korea
- Name: Hanil Car Ferry no. 1; Blue Pearl
- Owner: Hanil Express Ferry
- Operator: Hanil Express Ferry
- Route: Wando - Jeju
- Acquired: 2022
- Maiden voyage: 2022
- In service: 2022–2023
- Out of service: 2023
- Fate: Sold to 2GO Group

Philippines
- Name: 2GO Magalang; 2GO Masikap
- Owner: 2GO Group
- Operator: 2GO Sea Solutions
- Port of registry: Manila, Philippines
- Route: 1. Manila - Cebu - Manila (2025); 2. Manila - Davao - General Santos - Iloilo - Manila (2025); 3. Manila - GenSan - Davao - Cebu - Manila (2025)
- Acquired: 2023
- Maiden voyage: February 13, 2024
- In service: 2024–present
- Home port: Manila, Philippines
- Fate: In active service

General characteristics
- Type: ROPAX ferry
- Tonnage: 9,975 GT
- Length: 167 m (547 ft 11 in)
- Beam: 27 m (88 ft 7 in)
- Draft: 6 m (19 ft 8 in)
- Depth: 14 m (45 ft 11 in)
- Ramps: 1
- Installed power: 2 × Pielstick/NKK 18-cylinder 18PC2-6V diesel engines (19,680 kW (26,390 hp))
- Propulsion: Controllable Pitch Propeller(CPP) 2-shaft
- Speed: 21 knots (39 km/h; 24 mph) max
- Capacity: 678
- Crew: 26

MV 2GO Masikap (MSK), also known as MV Masikap, is a passenger ferry operated by the Philippine shipping company 2GO Group. The vessel originally entered service in 2002 as Ferry Kyoto II (Japanese: フェリーきょうとII).

Masikap is the sister ship of MV 2GO Masinag, formerly Ferry Fukuoka II, which was acquired by 2GO a few months later.

The vessel was designed under the concept of a "next-generation ferry that is friendly to both people and the environment." Its propulsion system was intended to reduce CO2 emissions by approximately 19% compared to conventional ferries, supported by an operational efficiency management system to lower fuel consumption. The interior design was commissioned to Dugdir Management & Design, a British firm known for its work on the Orient Express, and was themed around providing a "peace of mind on the journey." The ship was also built as a barrier-free vessel, with multi-purpose restrooms and elevators installed to accommodate passengers with reduced mobility.

== Service history ==
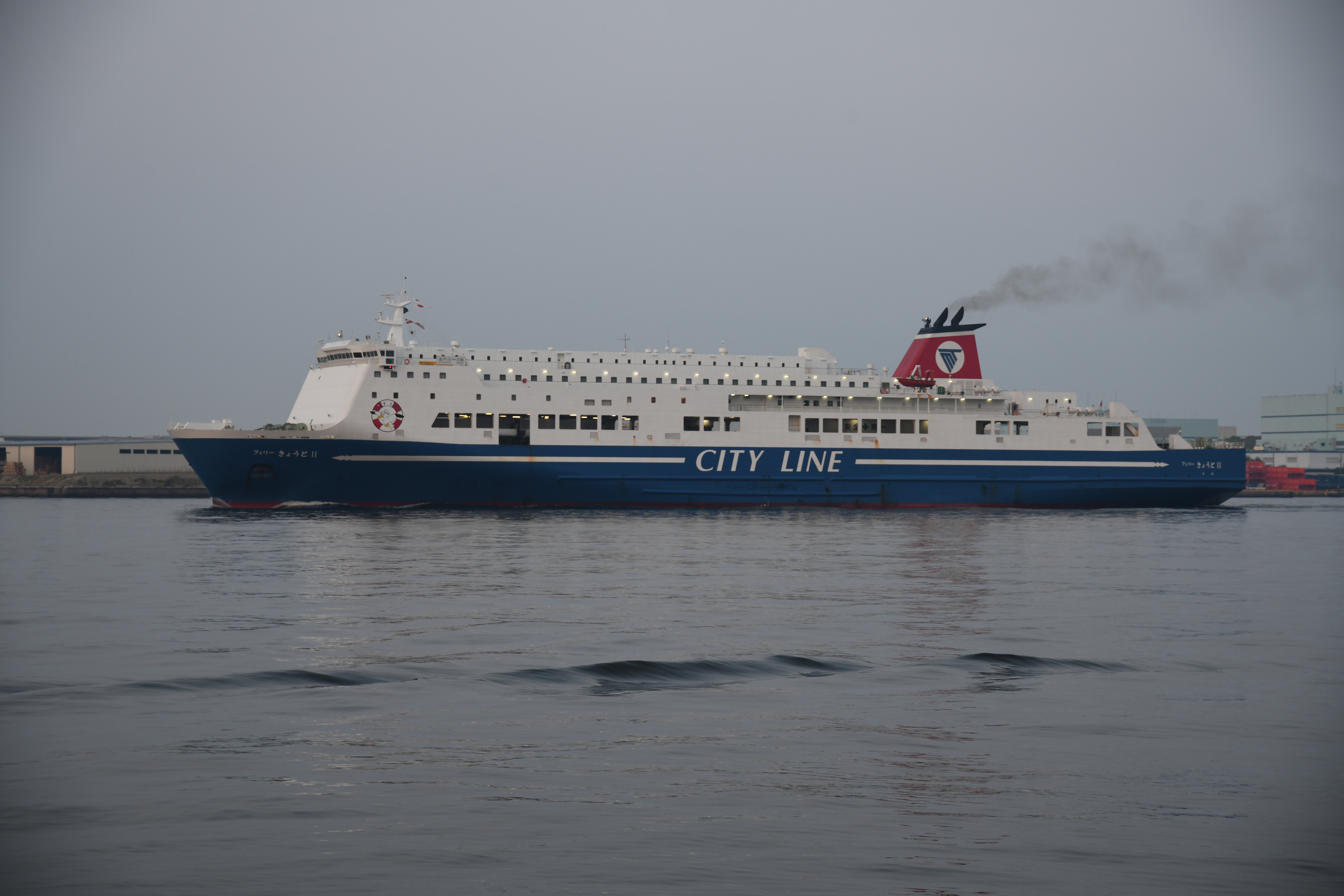
MV 2GO Masikap as the Ferry Kyoto 2

The vessel was jointly built with the Japan Railway Construction, Transport and Technology Agency in 2002 as a replacement for the original Ferry Kyoto, which had been launched in 1989 and was later sold to WG&A Philippines in 2002, where it entered service as MV SuperFerry 15 in the same year.

In 2005, the ship underwent remodeling, which included the addition of a second-class Western-style cabin and a first-class Western-style cabin on the starboard bow.

At the end of 2015, following the introduction of Ferry Osaka II, the vessel was reassigned to the late afternoon departures, replacing the earlier Ferry Osaka. To coincide with the entry of the new ships into service, the numerical notation in the ship's name was changed from Arabic to Roman numerals.

In December 2021, Meimon Taiyō Ferry took delivery of the new Ferry Kyoto, which was intended to replace Ferry Kyoto II. Although its successor entered service on December 16, Ferry Kyoto II was initially retained on its regular route to cover for scheduled maintenance on Ferry Kitakyushu II from December 16 to 27, and later for Ferry Osaka II from January 5, 2022. On the morning of January 14, 2022, Ferry Kyoto II docked at Shinmoji, completing its final voyage for Meimon Taiyo Ferry. The vessel was officially was subsequently sold to the South Korean company Hanil Express on January 18.

Renamed Hanil Car Ferry No. 1 and re-registered under the South Korean flag, the ship departed Shinmoji on 18 January 2022 for South Korea. It arrived in Busan the following day and entered dry dock to undergo modifications in preparation for its new service. In addition to being repainted in the livery of Hanil Express and receiving interior refurbishment, the ship's car deck access was altered at the stern, with the original stern (axial) ramp removed and replaced by a port-side loading door. Upon completion of the work, the vessel was renamed Blue Pearl (Korean: 블루펄). On 2 May 2022, the Blue Pearl entered service with Hanil Express, operating on the route between Wando and Jeju.

After approximately one year in service in South Korea, the vessel was withdrawn and listed for sale. It was then acquired by 2GO Travel, alongside MV 2GO Masigla. The ship was initially renamed MV 2GO Magalang, but upon arrival in the Philippines, issues concerning its registration led to its renaming as MV 2GO Masikap.

== Onboard ==
MV 2GO Masikap has a total of eight operational decks. Although the vessel structurally spans ten decks, two of them are not in use as car decks to accommodate cargo on board. Passenger accommodations are located on Decks 5, 6, and 7, while crew quarters are situated forward on Deck 7. Car decks occupy Decks 1 through 4.

=== Accommodations ===
- Business Class for 1
- Business Class for 2
- Business Class for 4
- Stateroom for 2
- Suiteroom for 2
- Mega Value Class
- Tourist Class

=== Amenities ===
- Horizon Cafe
- Island Fiesta
- Cafe 2GO
- Front Desk
- KTV
- Main Lobby
- Miniso and Kultura
- Watsons and QuikMart
- Salon
- Pet Room
- Observation Deck
- Sundeck

=== Images ===
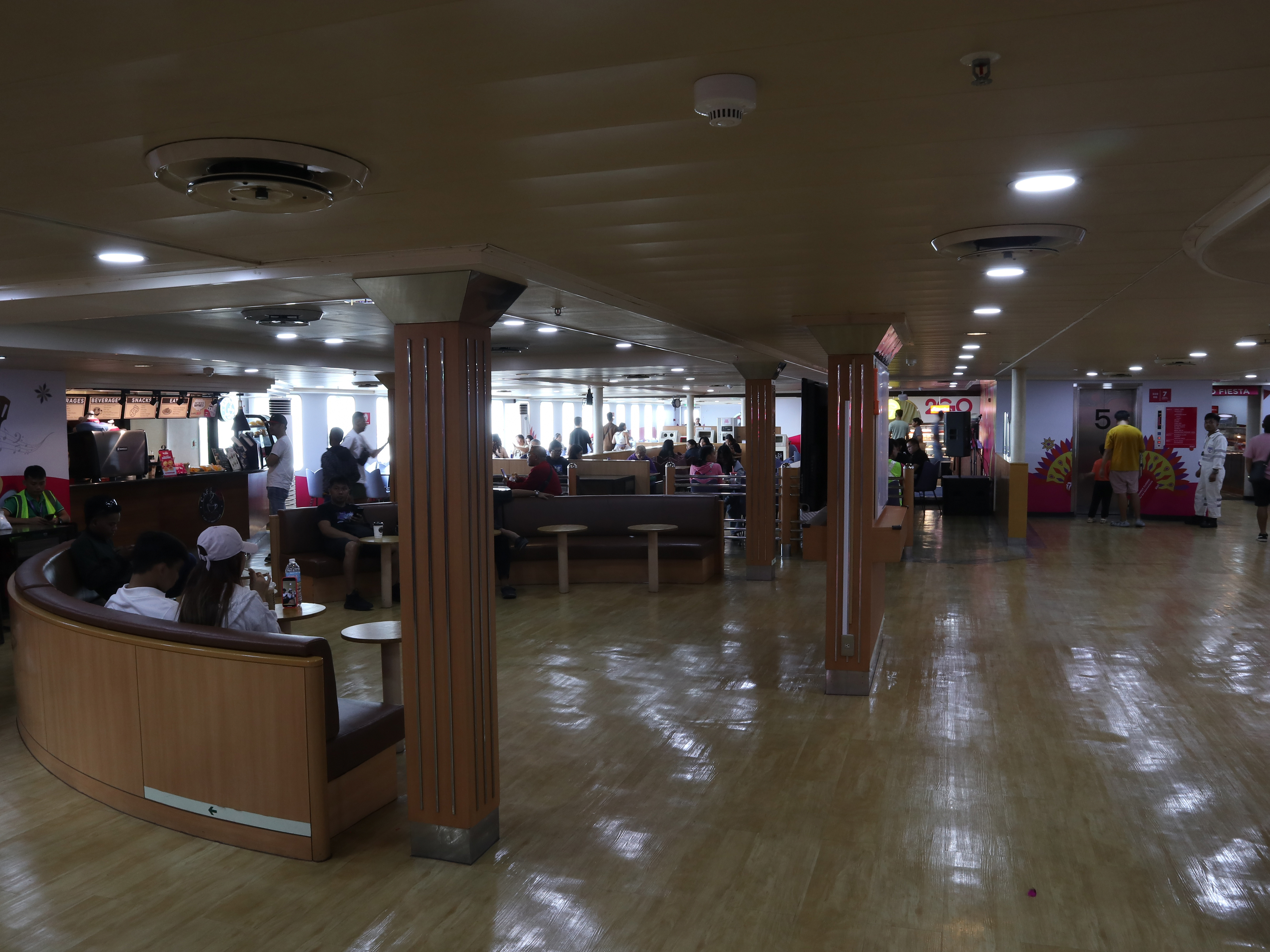
Main lobby

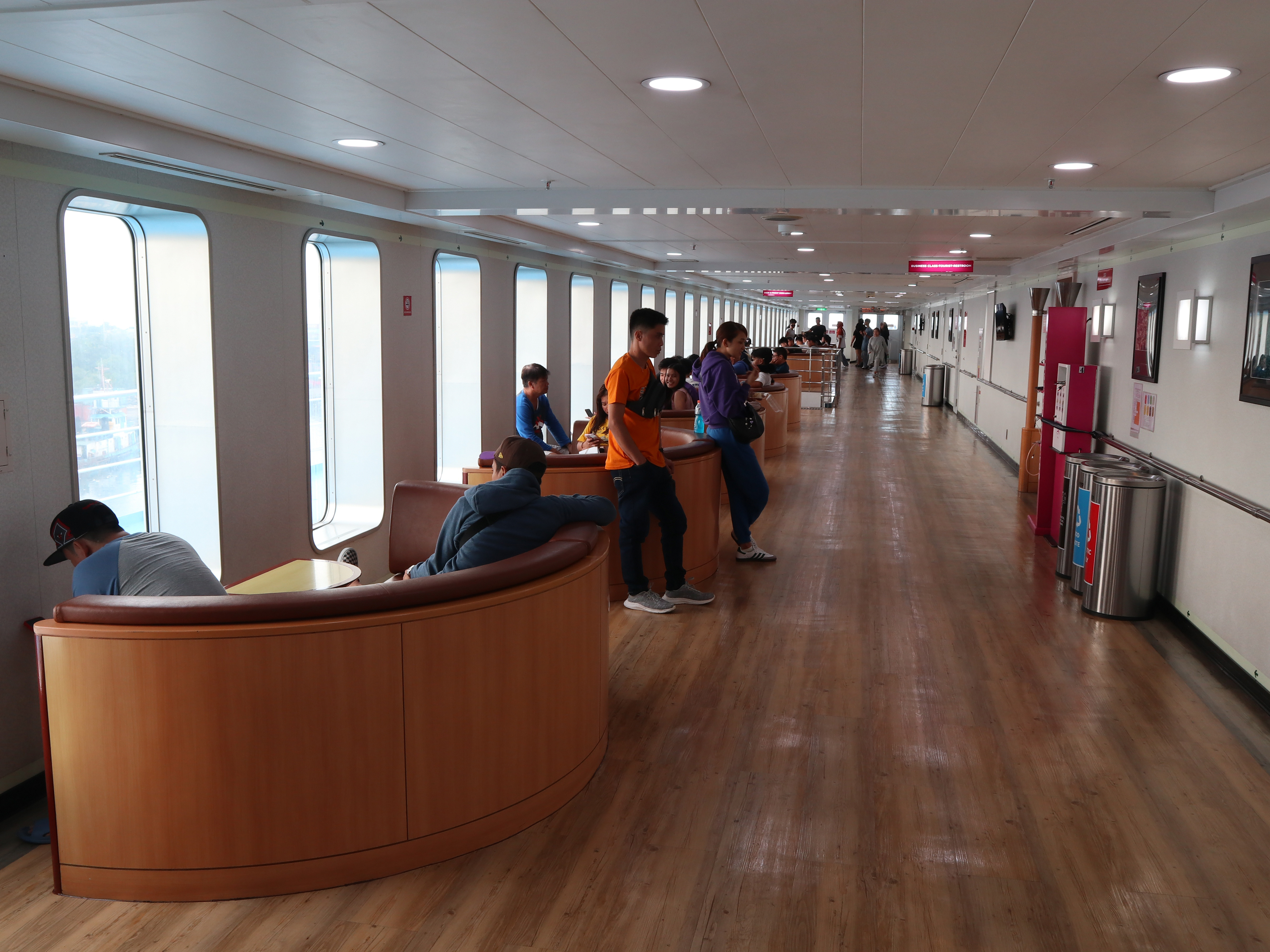
Observation deck

== Incidents and accidents ==
On May 13, 2007, while the Ferry Kyoto II was moving from a private wharf at Shin-Moji Port to Wharf No. 5, a child from a family fishing at the public wharf was seriously injured. The incident resulted in an open fracture of the child's left ankle after they were caught between the mooring line and the bitt.

Wharf No. 5 is a public space with unrestricted access. The family had followed instructions from onshore workers to wait during the mooring process. However, the workers moved on to the next task before completing the mooring. When the father approached the wharf to check the situation, the child followed and stepped into the looped end of the mooring line.

At the time, the ship's second officer, focused on the bow, did not monitor the stern area or check for safety. Without noticing the child, the officer gave the order to reel in the mooring line, resulting in the injury.

Following the accident, corrective measures were implemented to prevent similar incidents, including requiring onshore workers to remain on guard until mooring work is fully completed.

== See also ==
- 2GO Masagana
- 2GO Maligaya
- 2GO Masinag
- 2GO Masigla
