= 2GO Masigla =

Passenger ferry built in 1999

MV 2GO Masigla
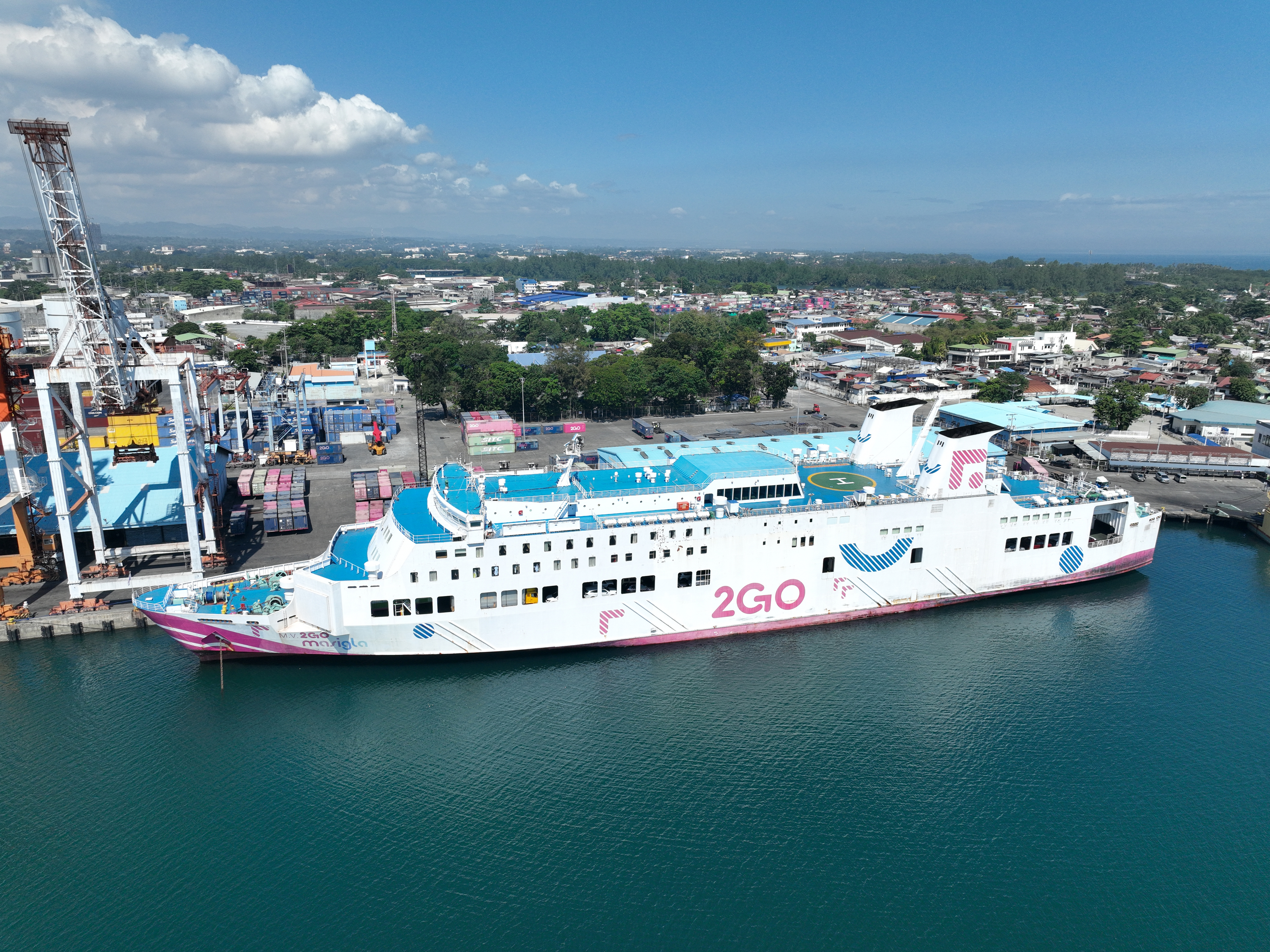

History

Japan
- Name: Orange 8
- Owner: Shikoku Kaihatsu Ferry Co. Ltd.
- Port of registry: Kobe, Japan
- Route: Tōyo - Saijō - Osaka
- Builder: Imabari Zōsen KK, Imabari
- Cost: Approximately 5 billion yen (35 million US dollar)
- Laid down: 1998
- Launched: April 18, 1999
- Maiden voyage: July 27, 1999
- In service: 1999–2018
- Out of service: August 24, 2018
- Identification: Call sign: 4DJL4; IMO number: 9202833; MMSI number: 548291900
- Fate: Sold to MS Ferry

South Korea
- Name: New Star
- Owner: MS Ferry
- Operator: MS Ferry
- Port of registry: Busan, South Korea
- Route: Busan - Jeju
- Maiden voyage: 2018
- In service: 2018–2024
- Out of service: 2024
- Home port: Busan
- Fate: Sold to 2GO Group Inc.

Philippines
- Name: 2GO Masigla
- Owner: 2GO Group
- Operator: 2GO Travel
- Port of registry: Manila, Philippines
- Route: 1. Manila - Cebu - Tagbilaran - Manila (2025); 2. Manila - Bacolod - Cagayan de Oro - Bacolod - Manila (2025); 3. Manila - Siargao - Butuan - Ozamiz - Manila (starts in January 2026)
- Maiden voyage: March 23, 2024
- In service: 2024–present
- Home port: Manila, Philippines

General characteristics
- Type: ROPAX ferry
- Tonnage: 9,975 GT
- Length: 163.75 m (537 ft 3 in)
- Beam: 26 m (85 ft 4 in)
- Draft: 4.99 m
- Ramps: 1
- Installed power: 2 × DU-SEMT Pielstick 18-cylinder 18PC2-6V diesel engines (20,133 kW (26,999 hp))
- Propulsion: Controllable Pitch Propeller(CPP) 2-shaft
- Speed: 20 knots (37 km/h; 23 mph) max
- Capacity: (Normal) 750 people, (max) 948 people

2GO Masigla is a passenger ferry of the Philippine shipping company 2GO Travel that originally entered into service in 1999 as Orange 8 for Shikoku Kaihatsu Ferry Co., Ltd. (also known as Shikoku Development Ferry and Shikoku Orange Ferry). She is the sister ship of MV Rigel VII (ex-Orange 7) of the Greek shipping company Ventouris Ferries.

== Service history ==
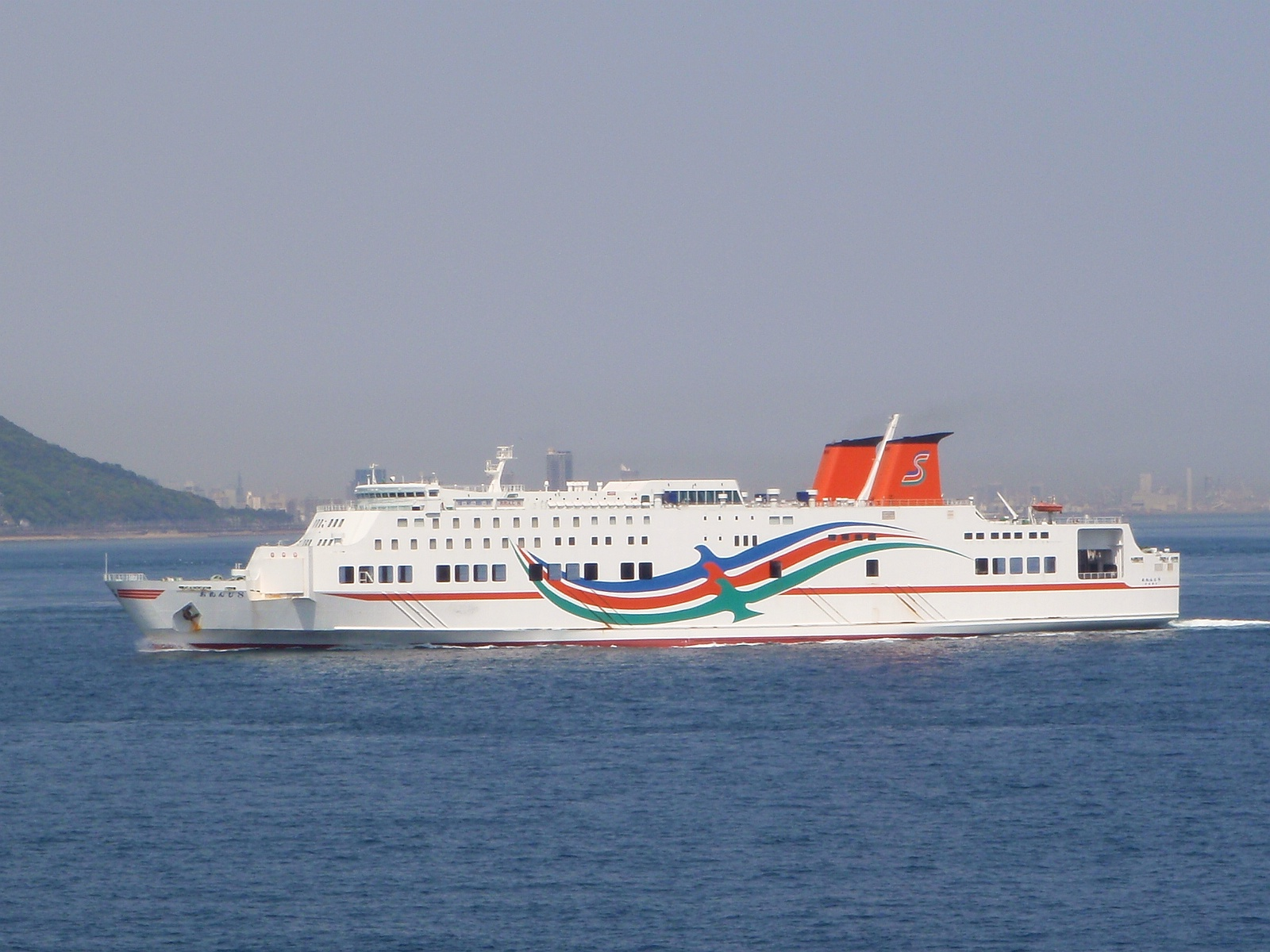
MV 2GO Masigla as Orange 8 when she was still in Japan.

The vessel was built by Imabari Shipbuilding at its Imabari Works as a replacement for New Orange and entered service on the Tōyo (a port in Ehime Prefecture ) to Saijō and Osaka route on July 27, 1999. Upon entering service, it operated alongside Orange 7, with each vessel completing one round trip per day, offering both daytime and overnight sailings. However, following a timetable revision on October 1, 2012, the schedule was reduced, and the two ships were limited to one round trip per day, operating only overnight services.

After 19 years of service, Orange 8 completed her final commercial voyage for Orange Ferry on August 24, 2018, completing its final voyage from Osaka to Tōyō Port. Along with Orange 7, she was subsequently withdrawn from service and replaced by the newly built Orange Ehime, which began service on August 25, 2018.

After its withdrawal, Imabari Shipbuilding removed the vessel’s name and carried out the necessary decommissioning procedures. The ship then sailed from Japan to Busan, South Korea, between August 28 and 29, to be prepared for sale.

She was then acquired by MS Ferry – a ferry operator based in South Korea that served the route between Busan to Jeju, South Korea, where she was named New Star. The new owner initially retained the original Orange Ferry livery on both sides of the hull for aesthetic reasons. However, Orange Ferry requested that the livery be modified to avoid confusion with its active fleet, prompting the new owner to alter the vessel’s exterior appearance. In 2023, when the company ceased operations, she was made available for purchase and was then acquired by 2GO Group, alongside MV 2GO Masikap. The ship entered service on 23 March 2024 on 2GO Travel’s newest route, operating the Manila–Davao–General Santos–Iloilo–Manila loop.

On April 26, 2024, Liza Araneta Marcos led the inauguration of 163-meter (534 ft 9 in) 2GO Masigla, at Pier 4 station. Attending the ceremony were Chairman Frederic C. DyBuncio, Will Howell, Teresita Sy-Coson, Philippine Coast Guard, Commodore Arnaldo Lim and Jabeth Dacanay.

== Onboard ==
=== Accommodations ===
- Business Class for 2
- Business Class for 6
- Suiteroom for 2
- Mega Value Class
- Tourist Class

=== Amenities ===
- Horizon Cafe
- Island Fiesta
- Cafe 2GO
- Front Desk
- Singing Room
- Main Lobby
- Salon
- Sundeck
- Clinic
- Arcade
- Lounge

== Incidents and accidents ==
on June 7, 2010, Orange 8, heading east toward Osaka Nanko, collided with the fishing boat Toseimaru, heading south, about 1.3 nautical miles southeast of Shodoshima . As a result of the collision, Orange 8 sustained scratches in the center of the port side, while Toseimaru's captain sustained minor injuries and the bow was crushed. The captain of Toseimaru noticed Orange 8's approach 10 minutes before the collision, but was at the stern at the time of the collision cleaning mud from fishing nets, and did not notice the approach and increased speed to do so. Orange 8 saw Toseimaru 5 minutes before the collision, but thought it could pass by with a certain distance in mind based on its movements. 30 seconds before the collision, Orange 8 noticed Toseimaru's increased speed and shone its searchlight to warn of the danger, but did not use its whistle, so Toseimaru did not notice and the two vessels collided bow-first. The causes of the accident were determined to be failure to keep a watchful eye on the Toyosemaru and insufficient watch on the Orange 8.

== Gallery ==
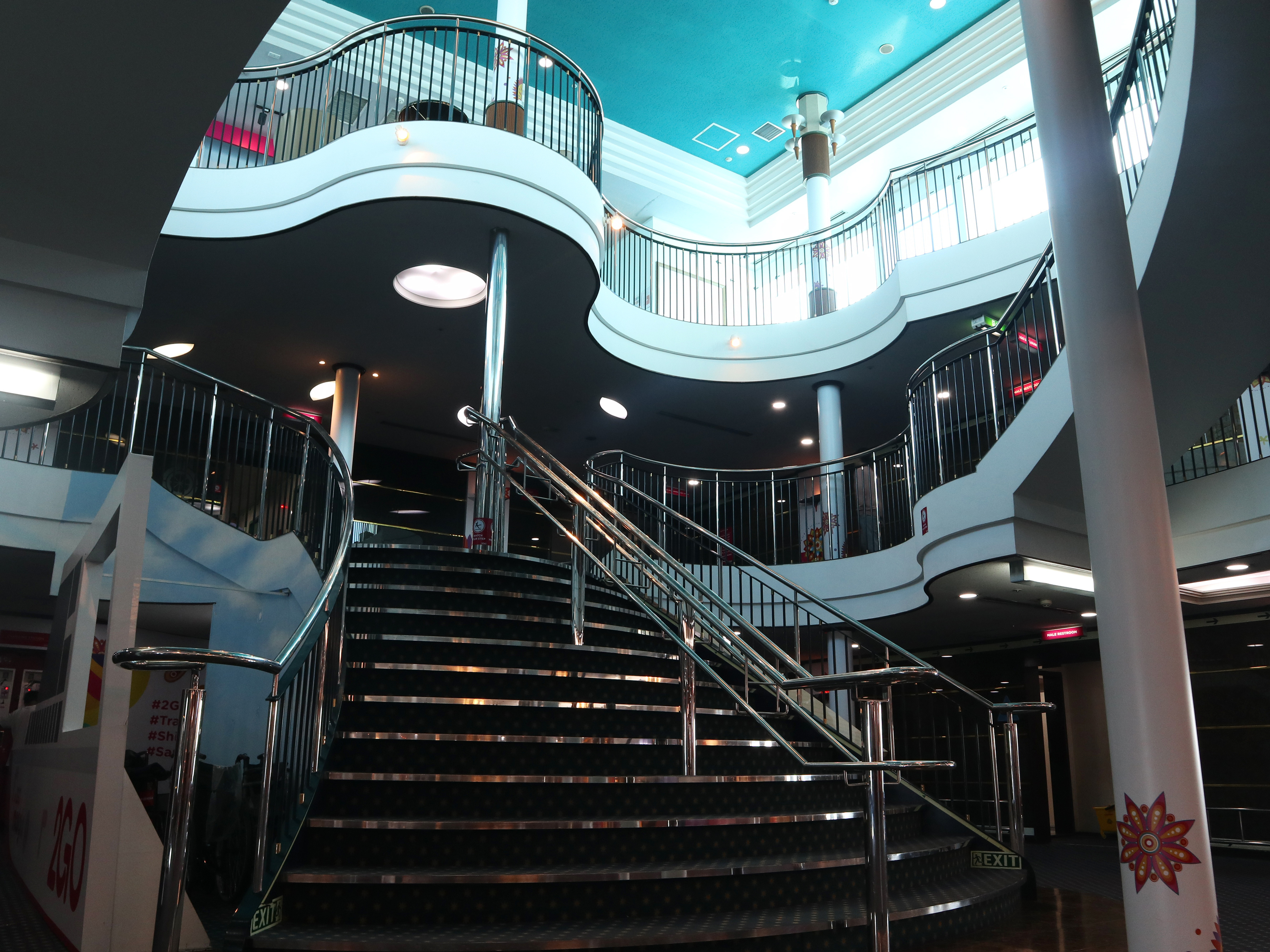
Main lobby of M/V 2GO Masigla.

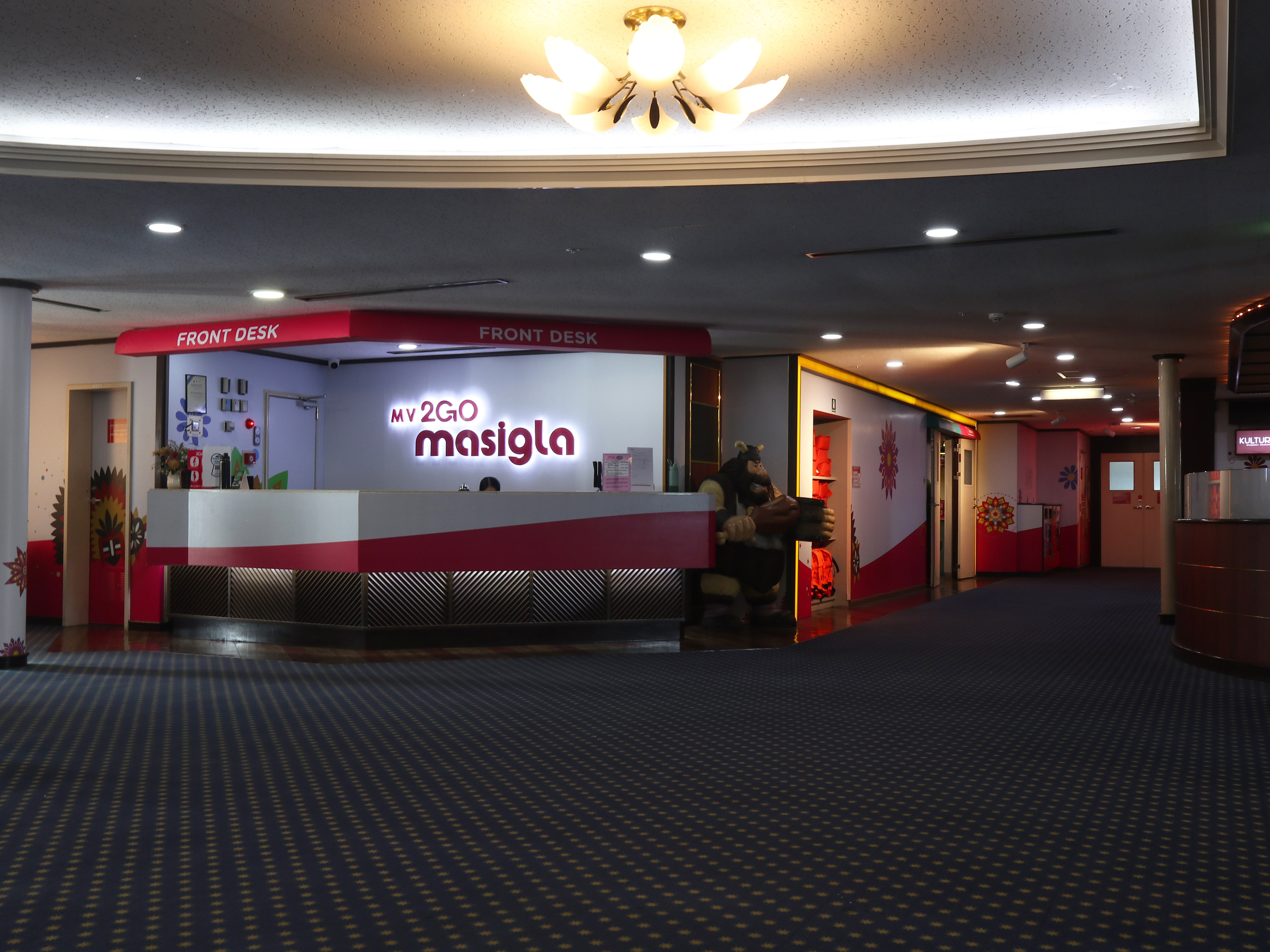
M/V 2GO Masigla's Front desk.

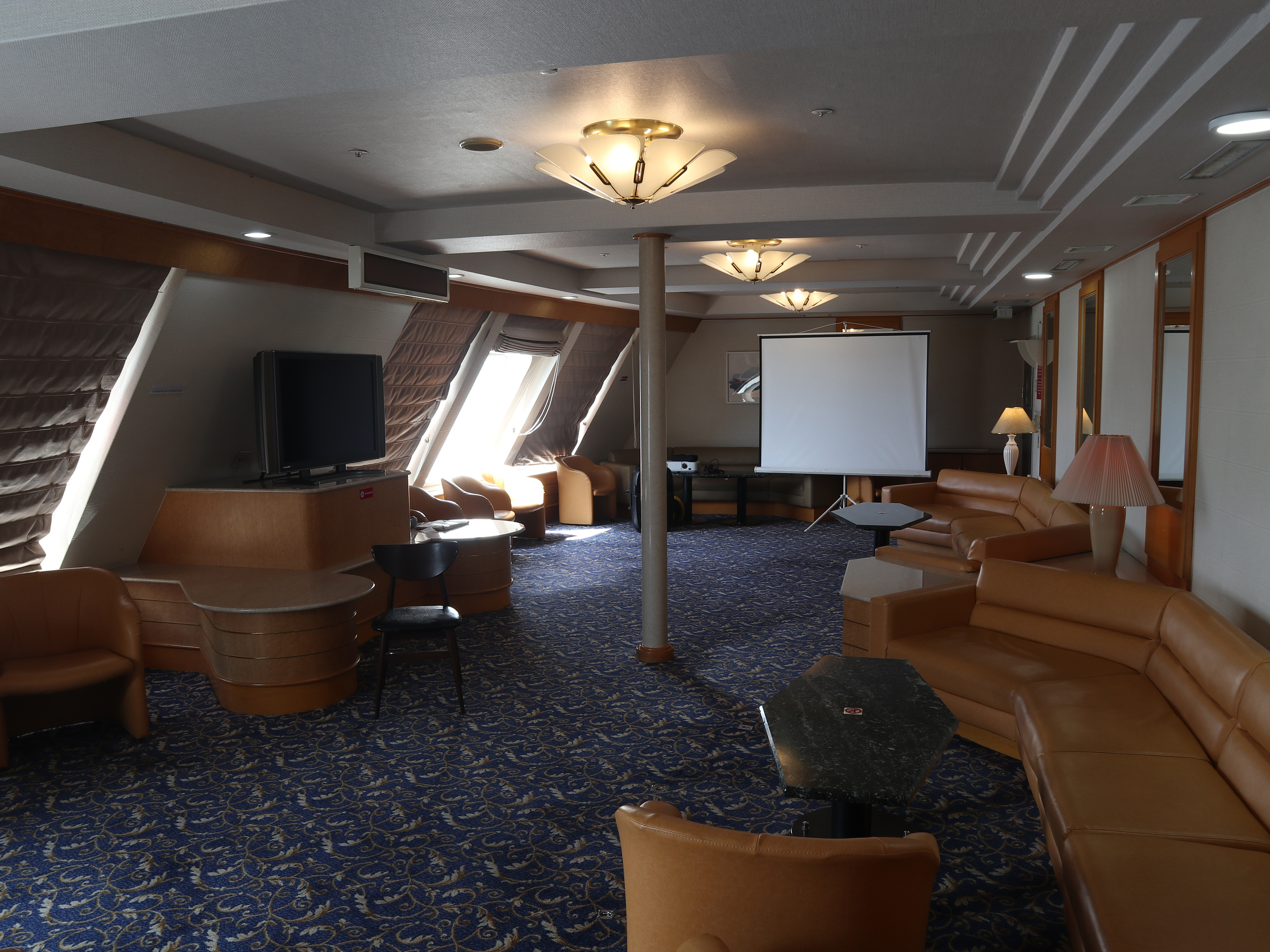
M/V 2GO Masigla's Deck D lounge.

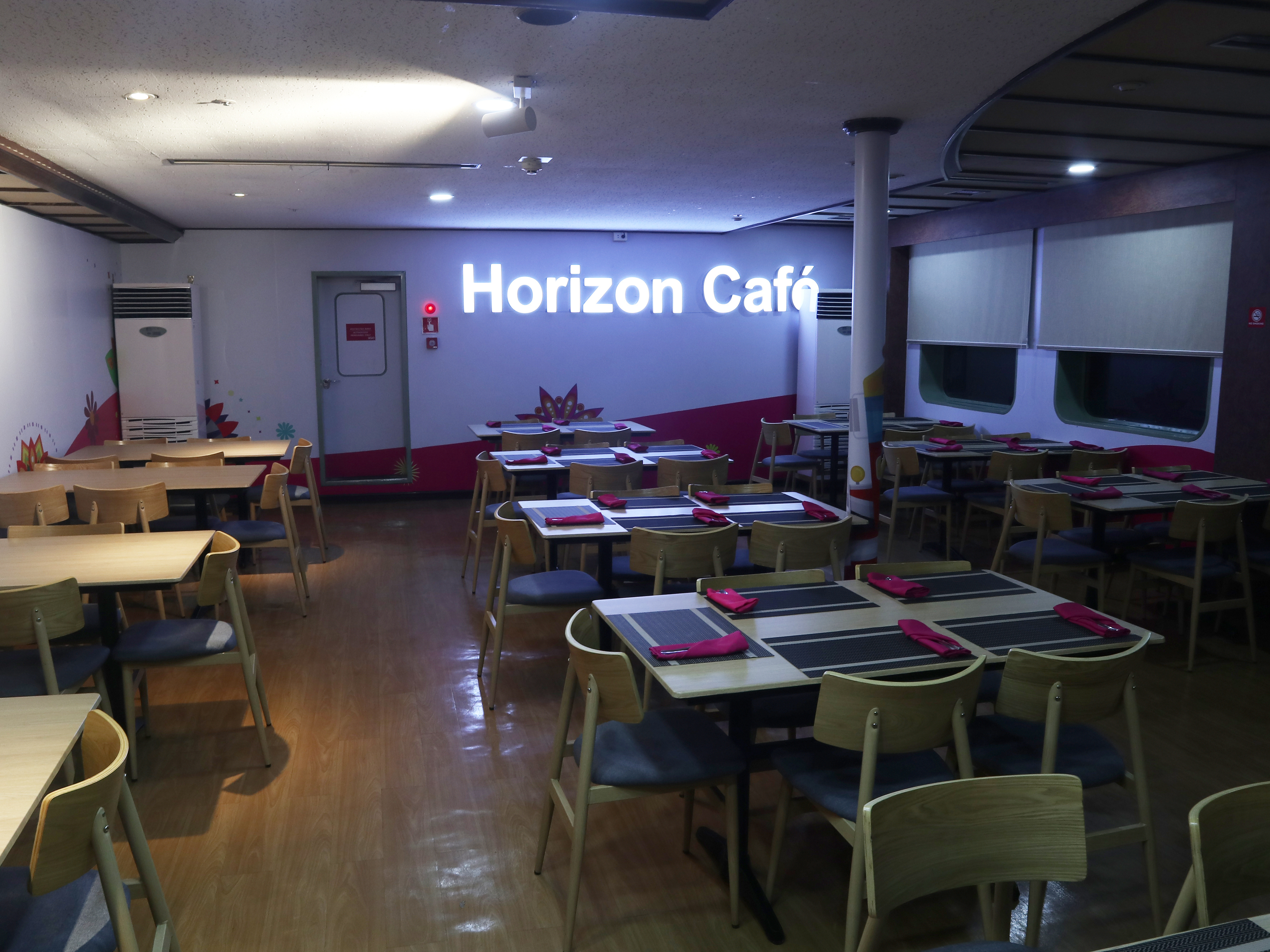
Horizon Cafe onboard M/V 2GO Masigla.

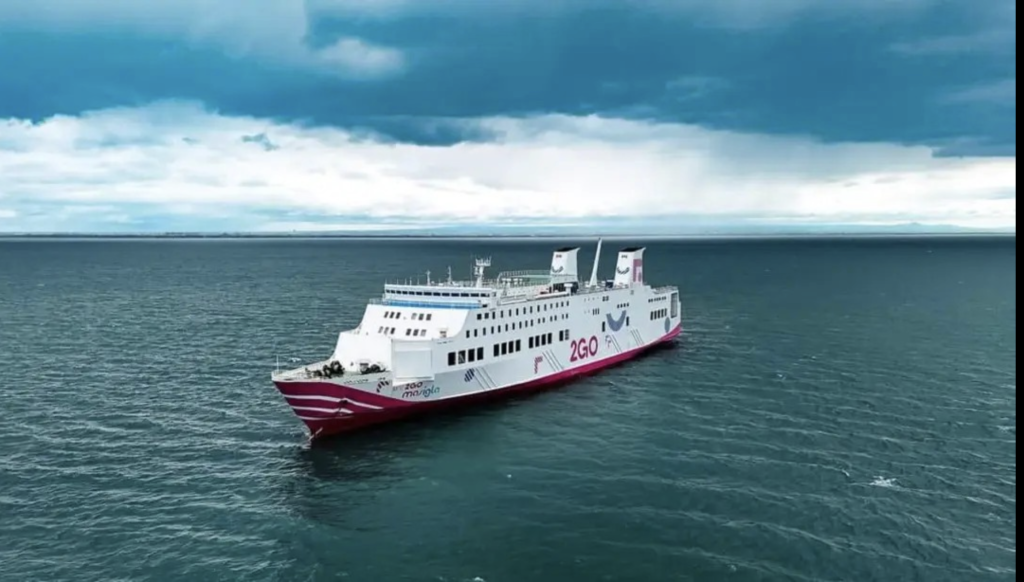
M/V 2GO Masigla on anchor at Manila Bay.

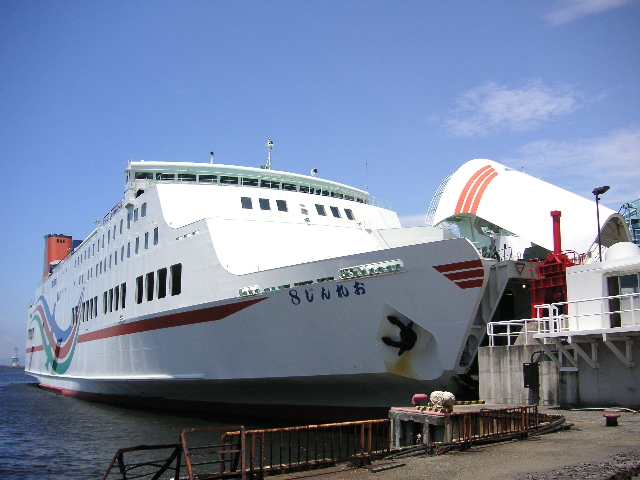
MV 2GO Masigla docked at Osaka Port when she was still in Japan.

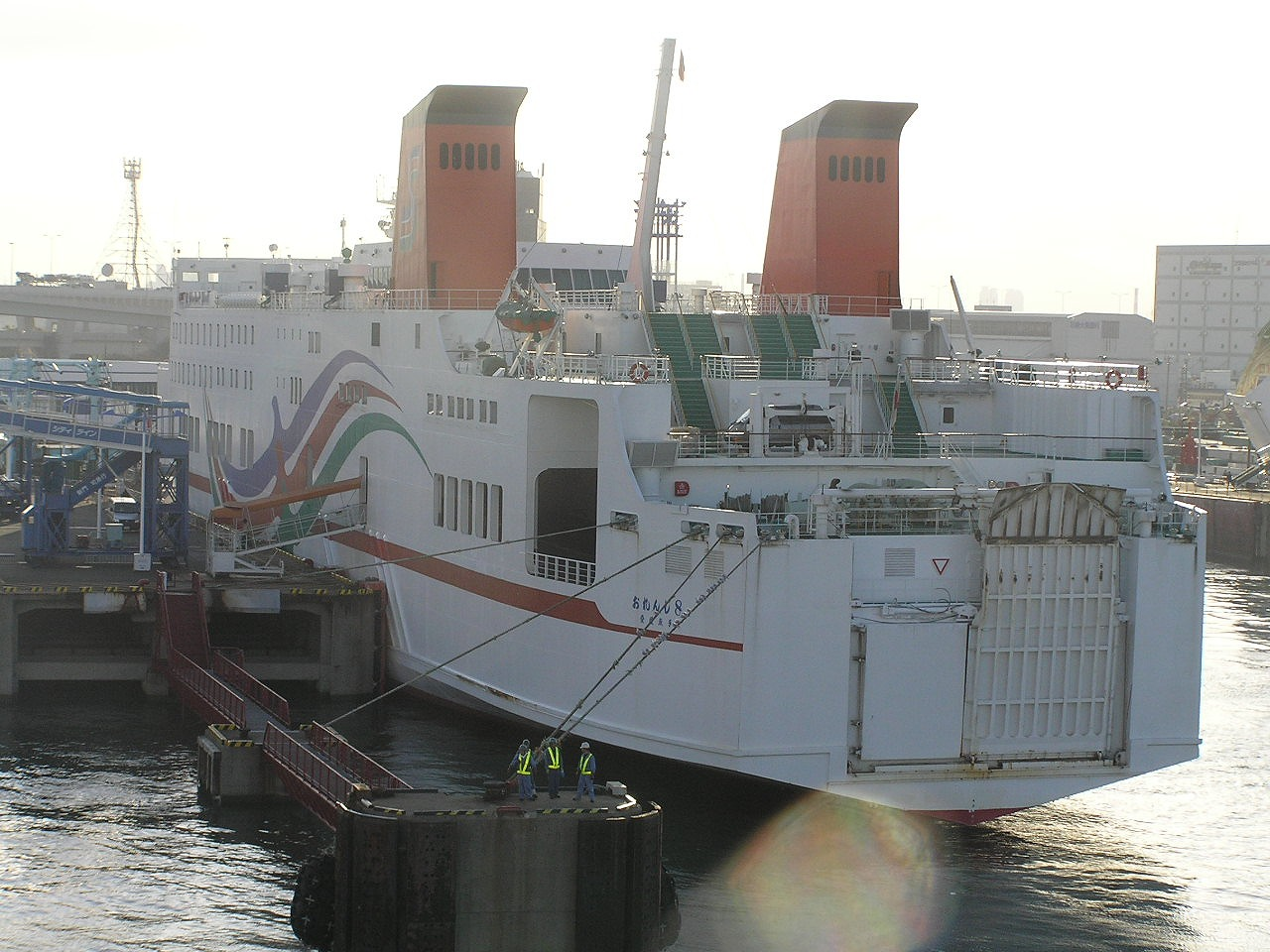
MV 2GO Masigla docked at Osaka Port when she was still in Japan.

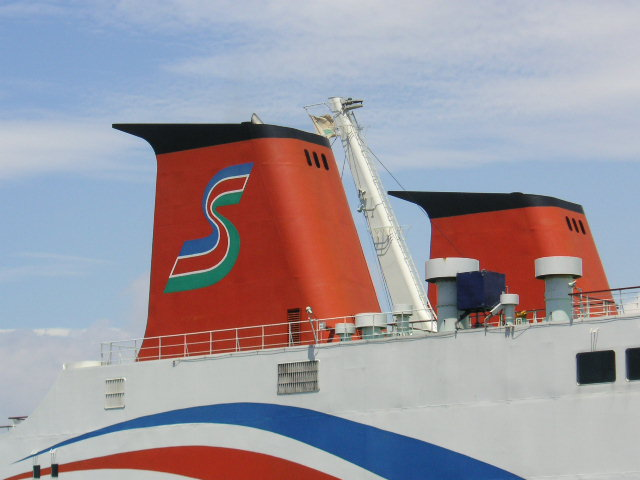
MV 2GO Masigla's funnel when she was still in Japan.

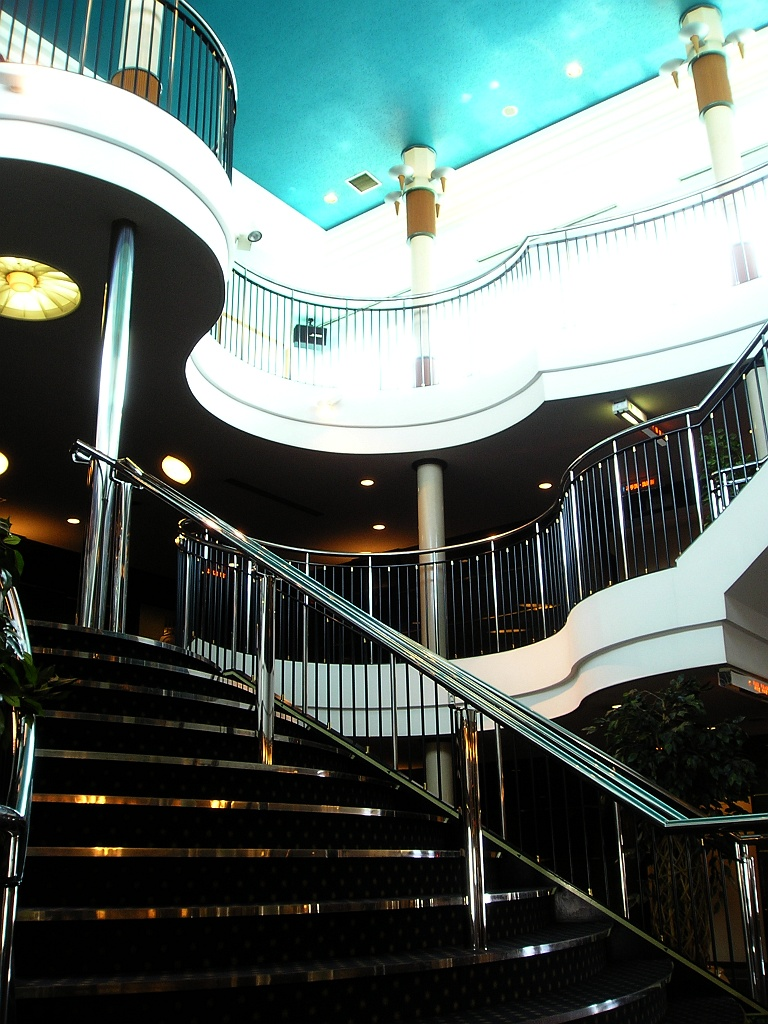
MV 2GO Masigla's main entrance when she was still in Japan.

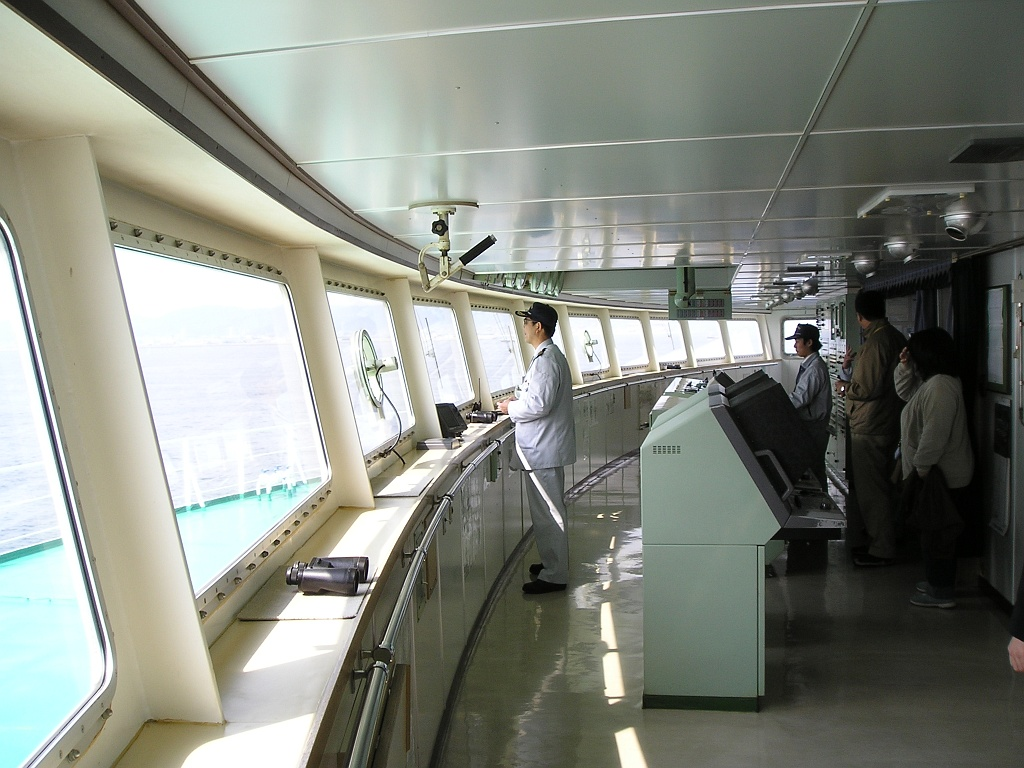
MV 2GO Masigla's bridge when she was still in Japan.

== See also ==
- 2GO Maligaya
- 2GO Masagana
- 2GO Masinag
- 2GO Masikap
