= 2go =

Mobile Instant Messaging Application

2go Chat – Chatrooms & Dating
- Developer: 2go Interactive (Pty) Ltd
- Release: 2007
- Type: Instant Messenger, Mobile Social Network
- License: Freeware
- Website: 2go.im

As advertised on Google's Play Store, 2go Chat is a chatrooms and dating app. The app was founded in South Africa and is currently run by 2go Interactive (Pty) Ltd based in Cape Town, South Africa.

== History ==
2go was created in 2007 in Johannesburg, South Africa, by a group of University of Witwatersrand computer science students. The service was originally developed as a students-only mobile website intended to function as a communication tool for students. 2go eventually moved away from the students-only model and targeted developing markets in Africa such as Nigeria, Kenya, and Ghana.

By 2018, the app had lost most of its users with suggestions that its failure to adapt to the growth of Android was to blame.
