= Manila =

Capital of the Philippines

Manila Maynila (Filipino) ᜋᜈᜒᜎ
- National capital and highly urbanized city
- City of Manila
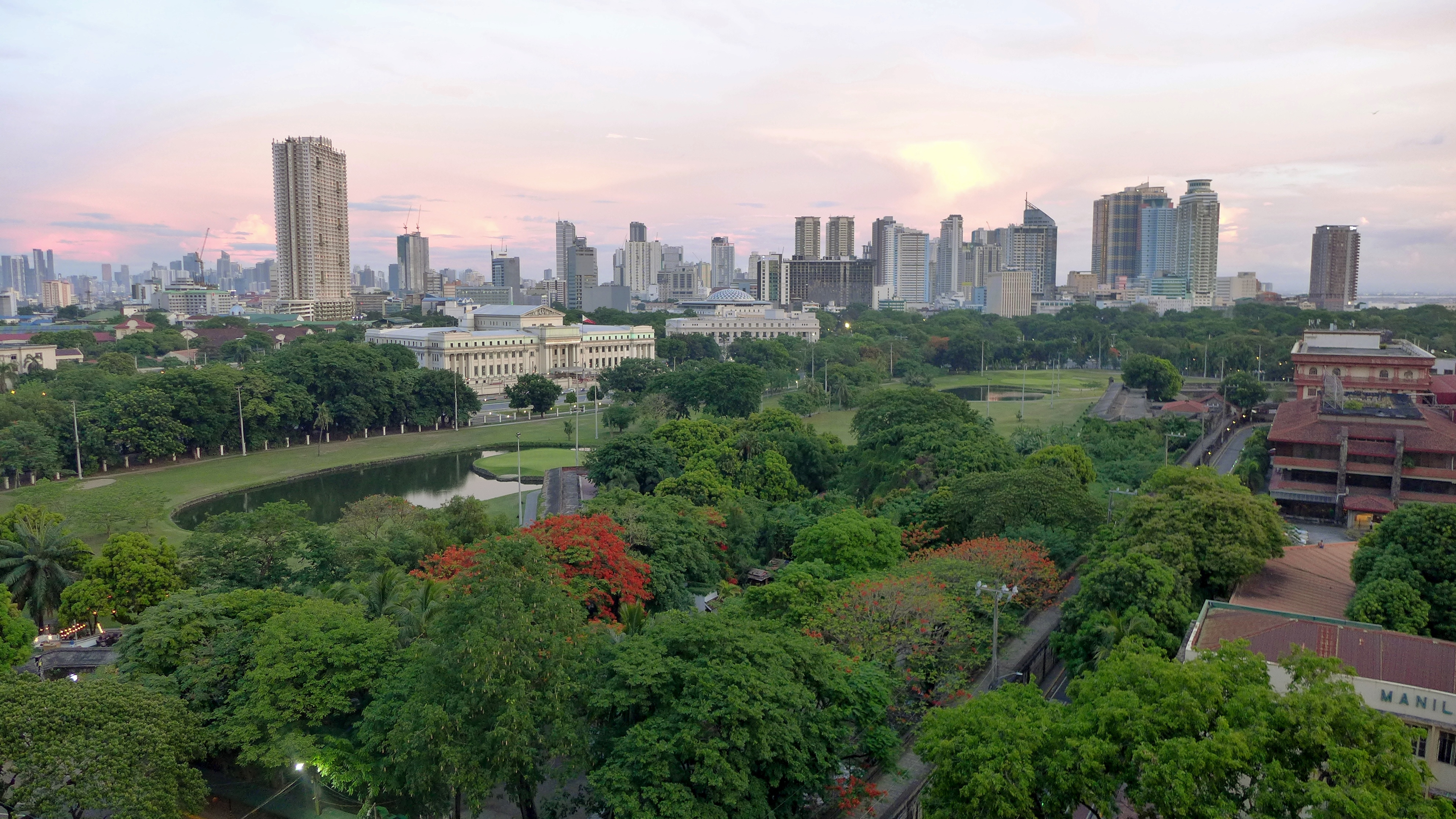
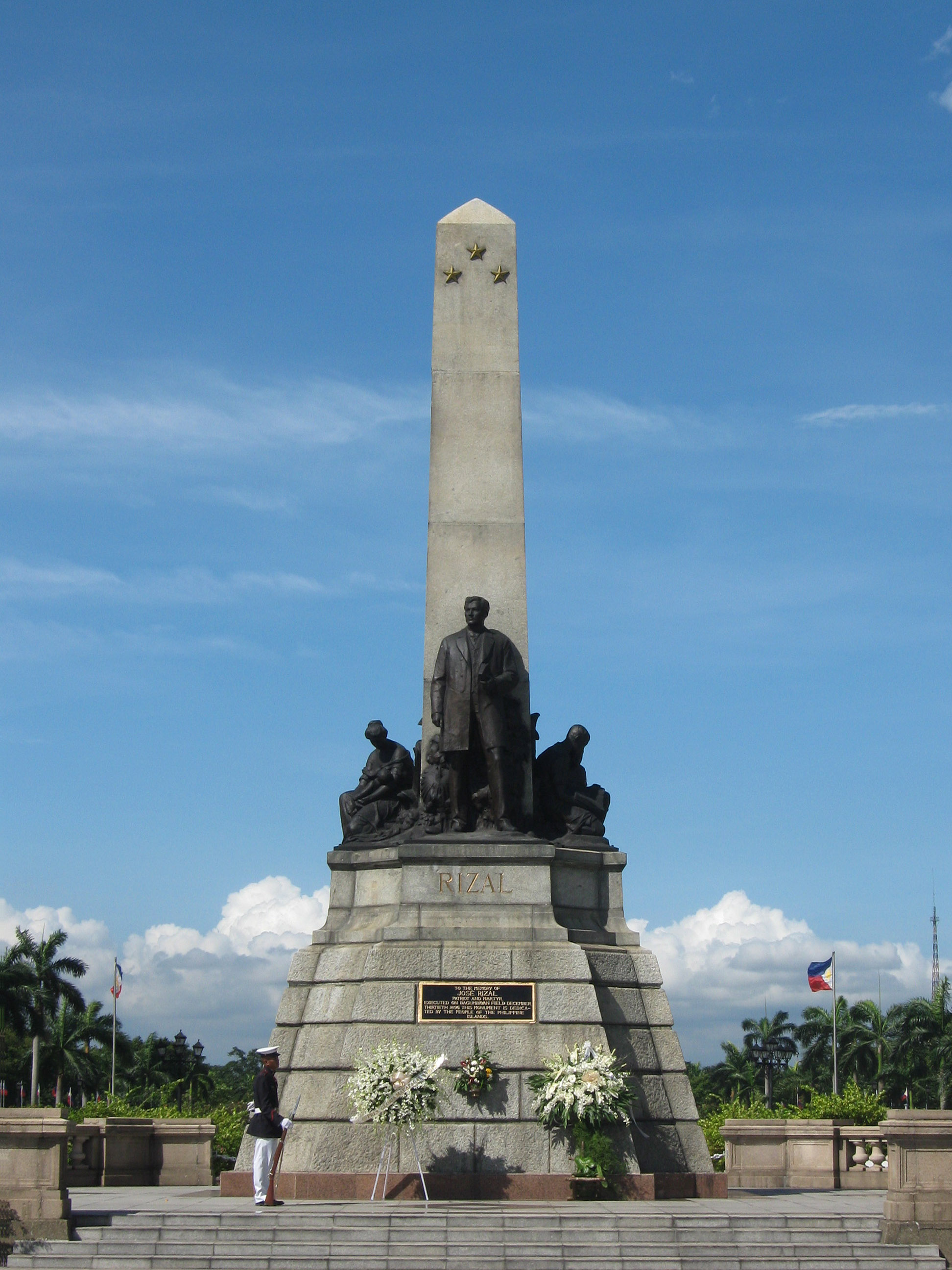
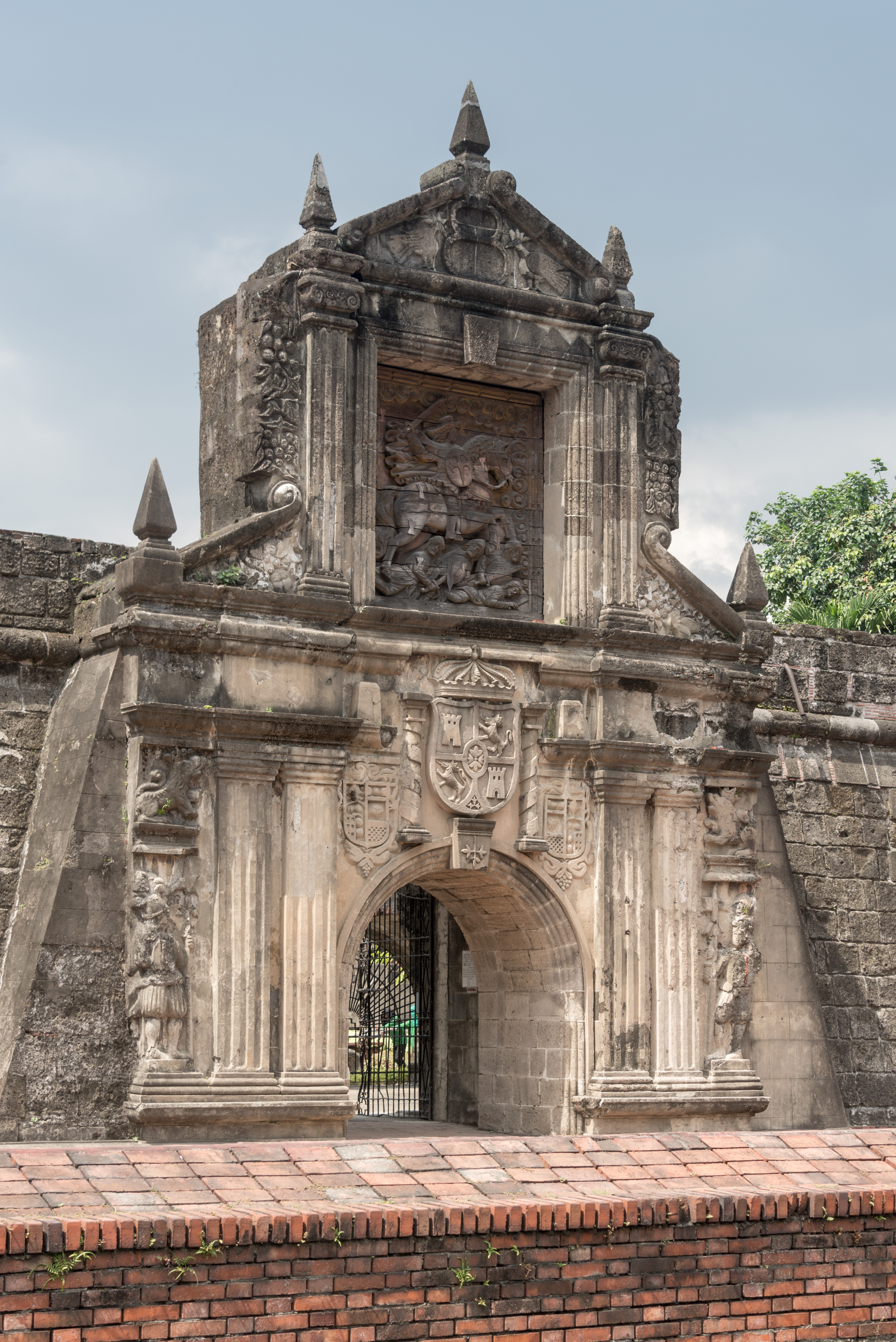
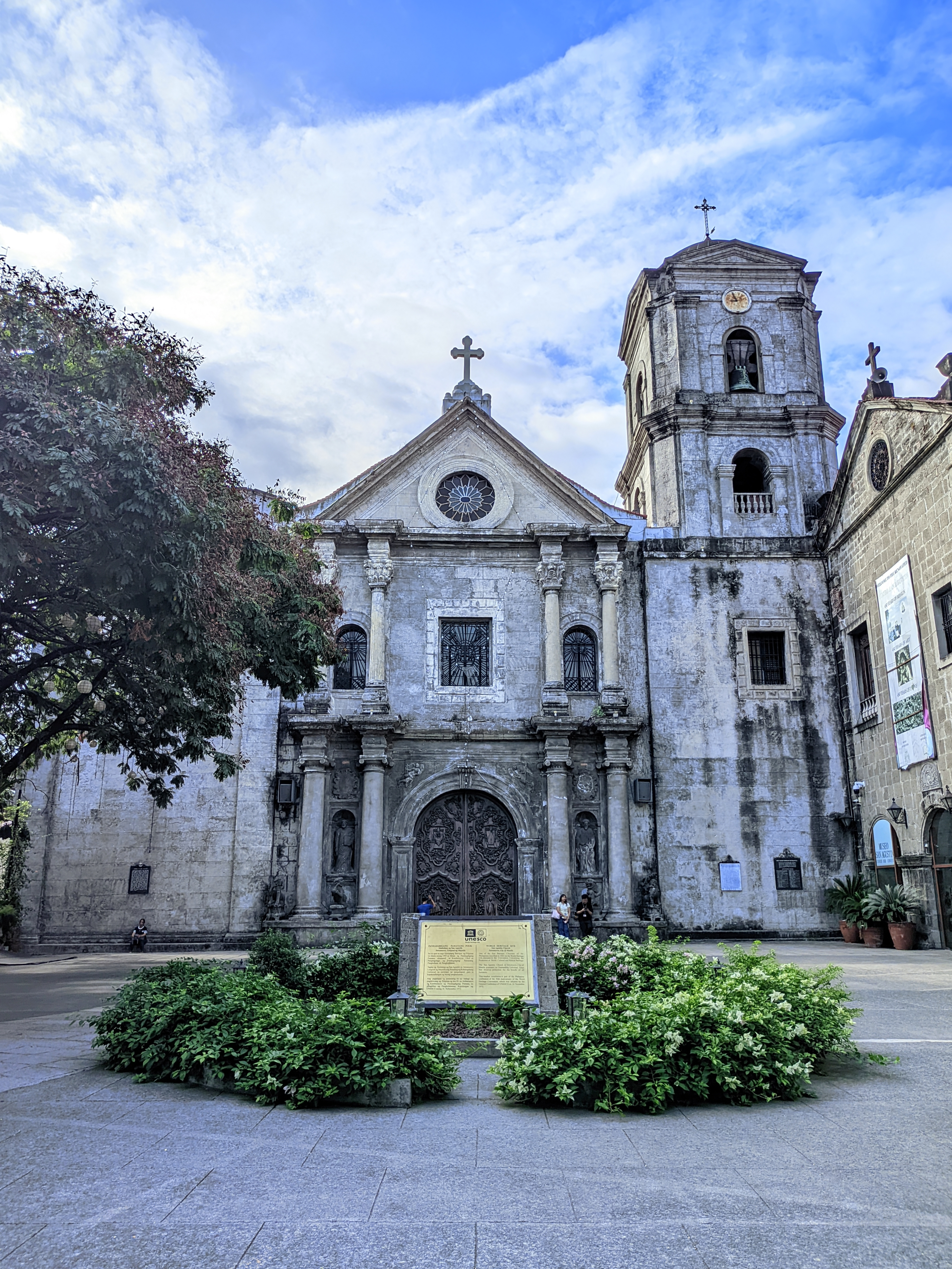
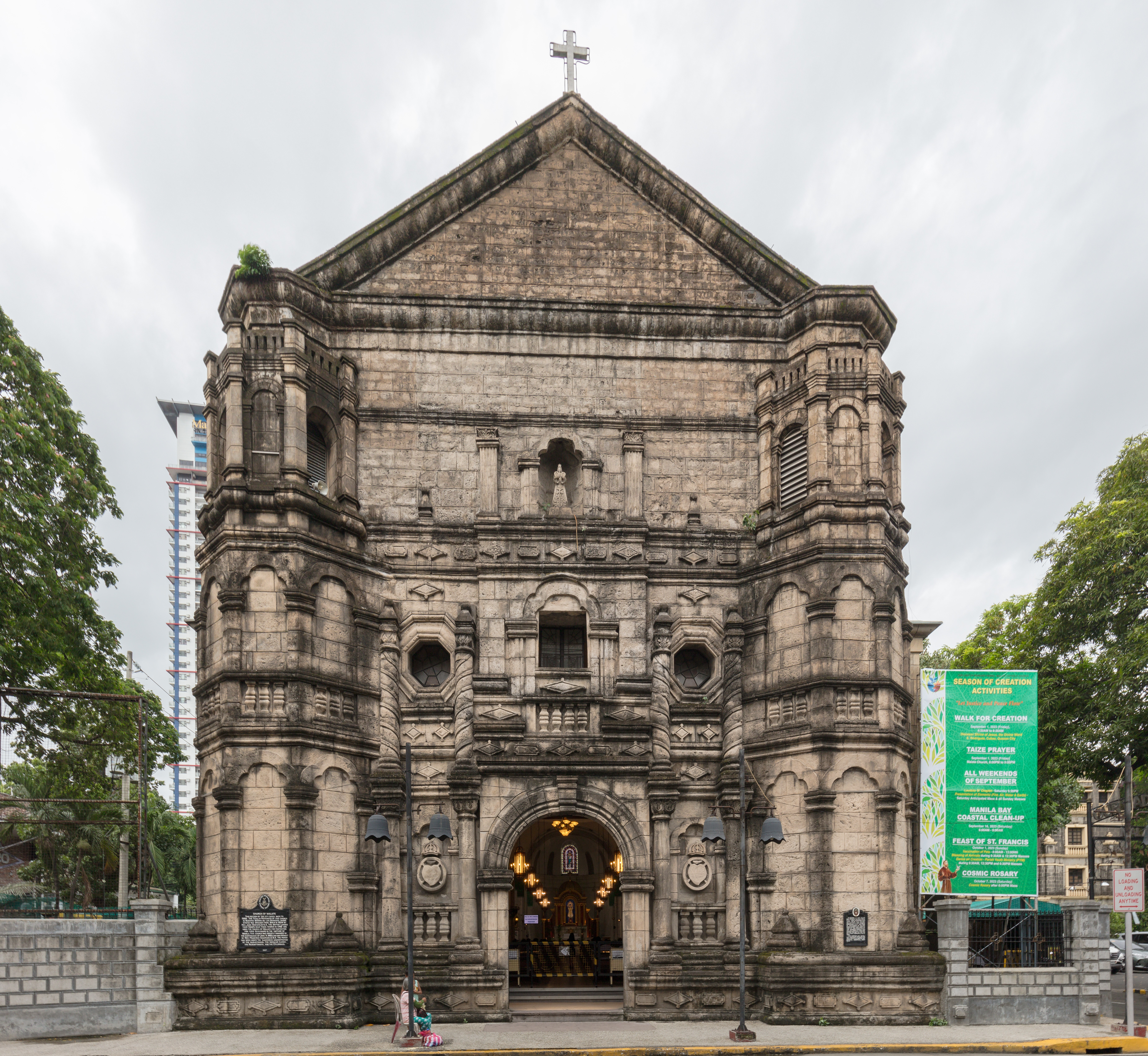
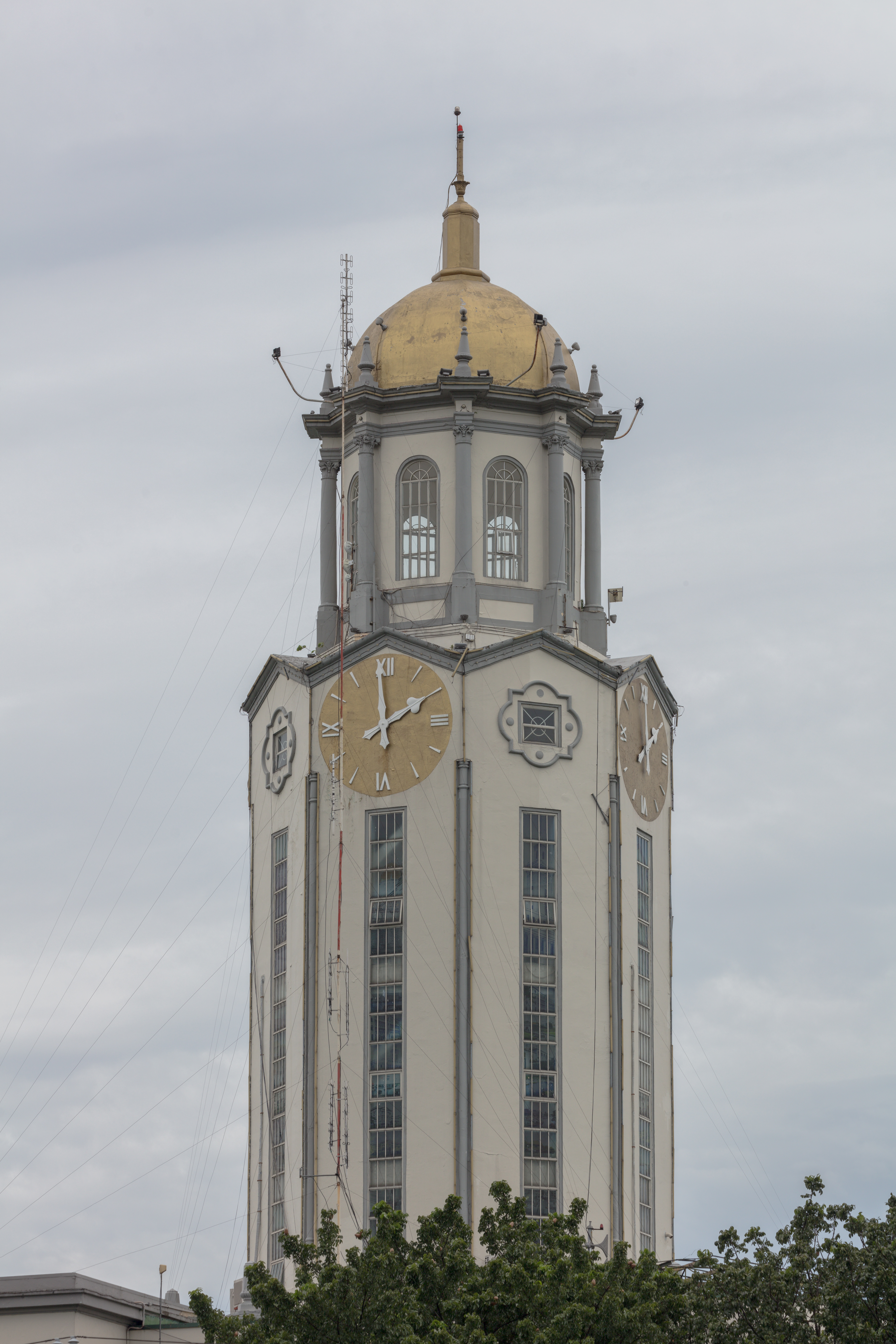
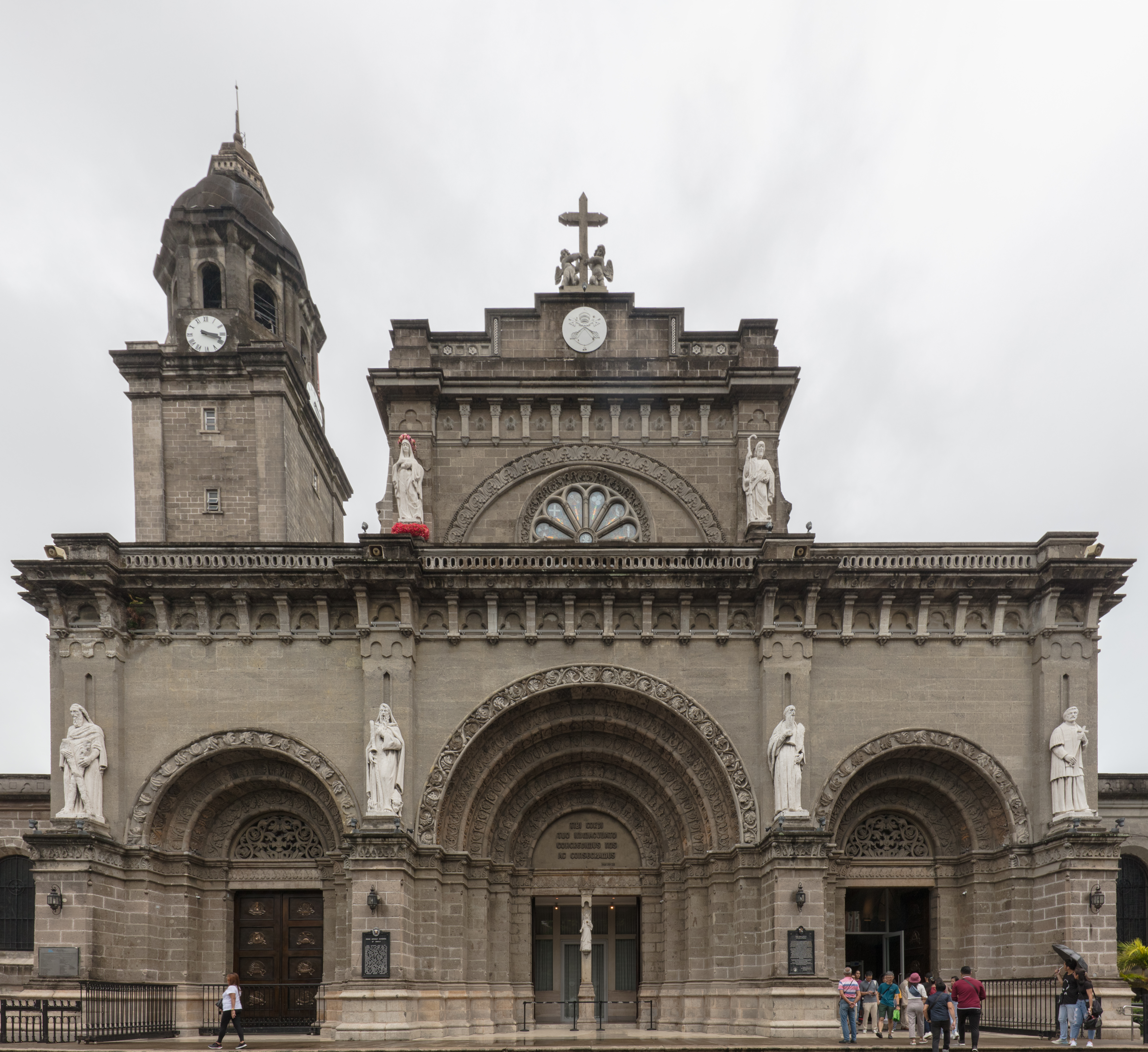
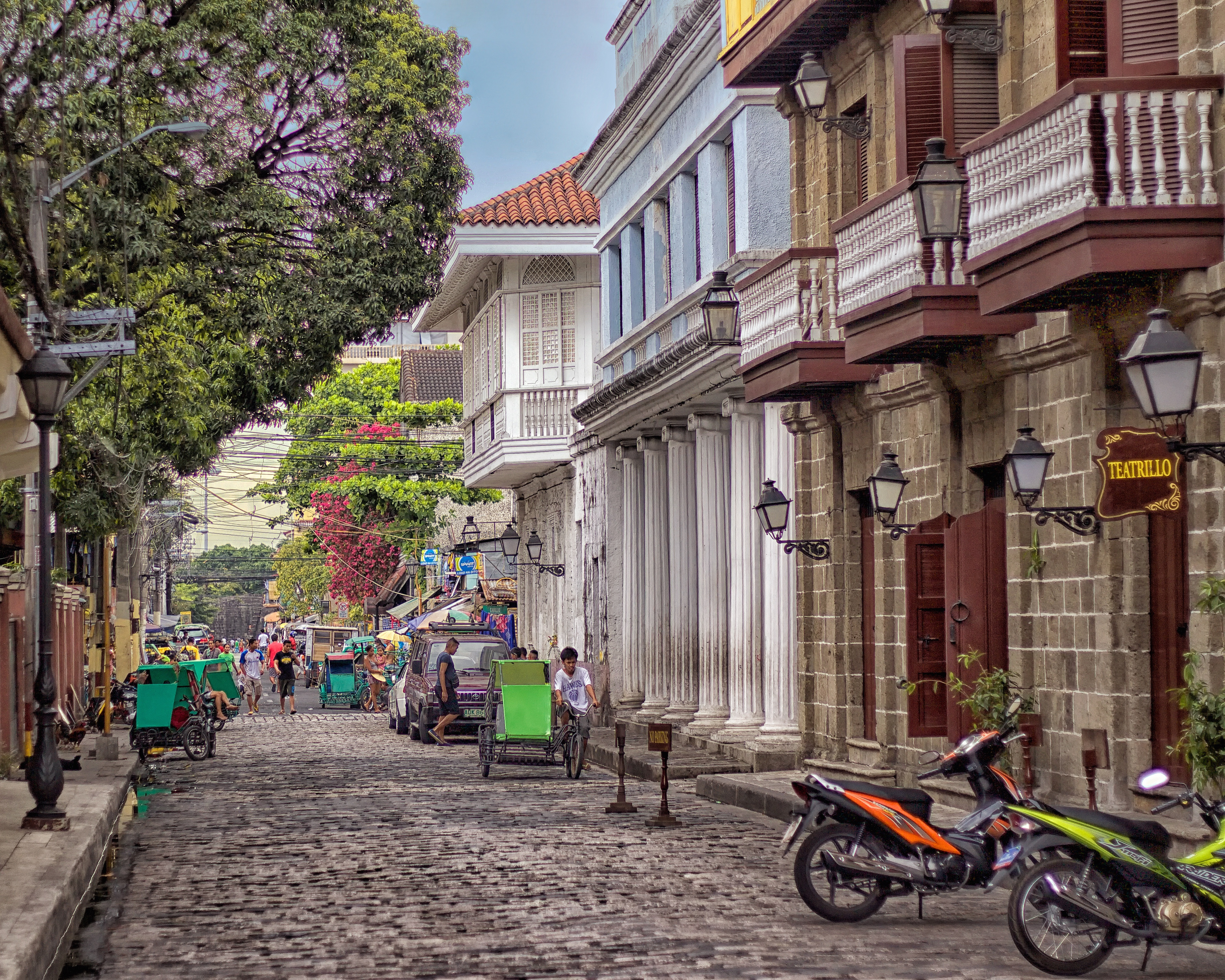
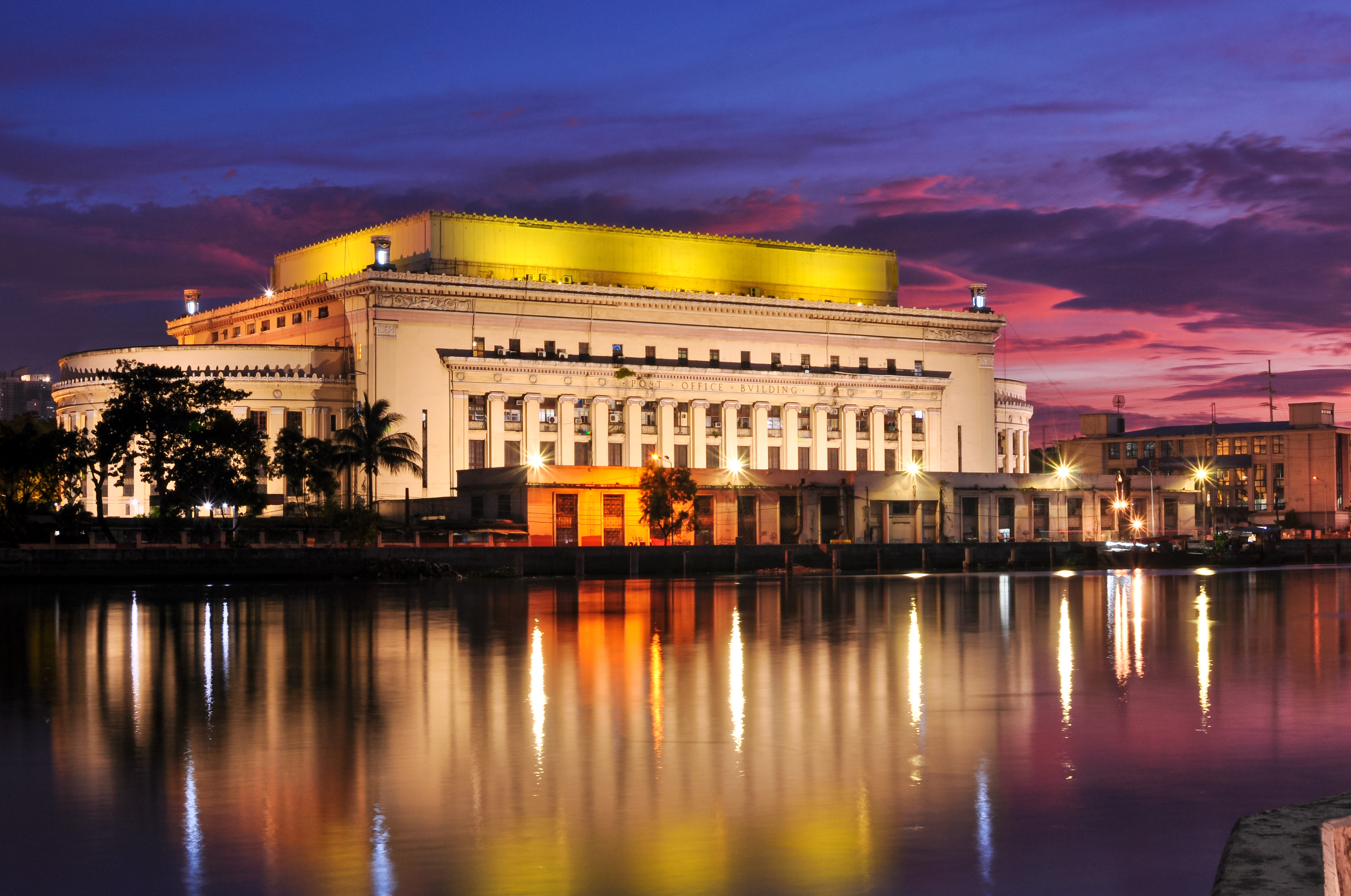
- Manila skyline viewed from Intramuros Rizal Monument Fort Santiago San Agustin Church Malate Church Clock Tower Manila Cathedral Intramuros Manila Central Post Office

- Flag Seal Logo and wordmark
- Nicknames: Pearl of the Orient and others
- Motto(s): Manila, God First; Welcome Po Kayo sa Maynila ("You are Welcome in Manila")
- Anthem: Awit ng Maynila ("Song of Manila")
- Map of Metro Manila with Manila highlighted (Note: The exclave within Makati is Manila South Cemetery.)
- Interactive map of Manila
- Location within the Philippines Manila (Philippines) Manila (Southeast Asia) Manila (Asia)
- Coordinates: 14°35′45″N 120°58′38″E
- Country: Philippines
- Region: Metro Manila
- Legislative district: 1st to 6th district
- Administrative district: 16 city districts
- Established: 13th century or earlier
- Sultanate of Brunei (Maynila): 1500s
- Spanish Manila: June 24, 1571; 455 years ago
- City charter: July 31, 1901; 125 years ago
- Highly urbanized city: December 22, 1979; 46 years ago
- Barangays: 897 (see Barangays and districts)

Government
  - Type: Sangguniang Panlungsod
  - Mayor: Francisco “Isko Moreno” Domagoso (Aksyon)
  - Vice Mayor: Angela Lei “Chi” I. Atienza (Aksyon)
  - Representatives: List: 1st LegDist; Ernix Dionisio; 2nd LegDist; Rolando Valeriano; 3rd LegDist; Joel Chua; 4th LegDist; Giselle Lazaro-Maceda; 5th LegDist; Irwin Tieng; 6th LegDist; Benny Abante
  - City Council: List: 1st district; • Martin "Marjun" V. Isidro, Jr.; • Moises "Bobby" T. Lim; • Erick Ian "Banzai" O. Nieva; • Niño M. Dela Cruz; • Irma C. Alfonso-Juson; • Jesus "Taga" E. Fajardo, Jr.; 2nd district; • Numero "Uno" G. Lim; • Darwin "Awi" B. Sia; • Macario "Macky" M. Lacson; • Rodolfo "Ninong" N. Lacsamana; • Roma Paula S. Robles-Daluz; • Ruben "Dr. J" F. Buenaventura; 3rd district; • Johanna Maureen "Apple" C. Nieto-Rodriguez; • Pamela "Fa" G. Fugoso; • Ernesto "Jong" C. Isip, Jr.; • Arlene Maile I. Atienza; • Terrence F. Alibarbar; • Timothy Oliver "Tol" I. Zarcal; 4th district; • Luisito "Louie" N. Chua; • Krystle Marie "Krys" C. Bacani; • Louisa Marie "Lady" J. Quintos-Tan; • Science A. Reyes; • Joel "JTV" T. Villanueva; • Don Juan "DJ" A. Bagatsing; 5th district; • Roberto "Bobby" S. Espiritu II; • Raymundo "Mon" R. Yupangco; • Laris T. Borromeo; • Jaybee S. Hizon; • Ricardo "Boy" A. Isip, Jr.; • Charry R. Ortega; 6th district; • Elmer M. Par; • Salvador Philip H. Lacuna; • Benny Fog T. Abante II; • Carlos "Caloy" C. Castañeda; • Luis "Joey" C. Uy; • Luciano "Lou" M. Veloso; Liga ng mga Barangay President; Leilani Lacuna; Sangguniang Kabataan President; Juliana Rae Ibay
  - Electorate: 1,142,174 voters (2025)

Area
  - City: 42.34 km^{2} (16.35 sq mi)
  - Urban: 619.57 km^{2} (239.22 sq mi)
  - Metro: 1,873 km^{2} (723 sq mi)
- Elevation: 9.0 m (29.5 ft)
- Highest elevation: 108 m (354 ft)
- Lowest elevation: 0 m (0 ft)

Population (2024 census)
  - City: 1,902,590
  - Rank: 2nd
  - Density: 44,936/km^{2} (116,380/sq mi)
  - Urban: 13,484,482
  - Urban density: 21,764.3/km^{2} (56,369/sq mi)
  - Metro: 24,922,000
  - Metro density: 13,305.9/km^{2} (34,462/sq mi)
  - Households: 486,293
- Demonym(s): English: Manileño, Manilan; Spanish: manilense, manileño (f. -a); Filipino: Manileño (f. -a), Manilenyo (f. -a), Taga-Maynila

Economy
  - Income class: 1st city income class
  - Poverty incidence: 1.6% (2023)
  - HDI: ▲0.781 – high (2019)
  - Revenue: ₱ 18,799 million (2025)
  - Assets: ₱ 150,124 million (2025)
  - Expenditure: ₱ 21,627 million (2025)
  - Liabilities: ₱ 55,969 million (2025)

Utilities
  - Electricity: Manila Electric Company (Meralco)
  - Water: • Maynilad (Majority) • Manila Water (Santa Ana and San Andres)
- Time zone: UTC+8 (PST)
- ZIP code: +900 – 1-096
- PSGC: 133900000
- IDD : area code: +63 (0)2
- Native languages: Filipino
- Currency: Philippine peso (₱)
- Website: manila.gov.ph

Manila, (Note: /məˈnɪlə/ mə-NIL-ə; Filipino: Maynila, IPA: [maɪˈniː.lɐʔ]) officially the City of Manila, (Note: Filipino: Lungsod ng Maynila, IPA: [luŋˈsod nɐŋ maɪˈniː.lɐʔ]) is the capital and second-most populous city of the Philippines after Quezon City. According to the 2024 census, it has a population of 1,902,590 people. Located on the eastern shore of Manila Bay on the island of Luzon, it is classified as a highly urbanized city. With 44,935 inhabitants per square kilometer (116,380/sq mi), Manila is one of the world's most densely populated cities proper.

By 1258, a Tagalog-fortified polity called Maynila existed on the site of modern Manila. On June 24, 1571, after the defeat of the polity's last indigenous ruler, Rajah Sulayman, in the Battle of Bangkusay, Spanish conquistador Miguel López de Legazpi began constructing the walled fortification of Intramuros on the ruins of an older settlement from whose name the Spanish and English name Manila derives. Manila was used as the capital of the captaincy general of the Spanish East Indies, which included the Marianas, Guam, and other islands, and was controlled and administered for the Spanish crown by Mexico City in the Viceroyalty of New Spain. Manila is considered to be part of the world's original set of global cities because its commercial networks were the first to extend across the Pacific Ocean and connect Asia with the Spanish Americas through the galleon trade. This marked the first time an uninterrupted chain of trade routes circling the planet had been established.

Under the American occupation, Manila became the first chartered city in the country, designated by Philippine Commission Act No. 183 on July 31, 1901. It became autonomous with the passage of Republic Act No. 409, "The Revised Charter of the City of Manila", on June 18, 1949.

In modern times, the name "Manila" is commonly used to refer to the entire metropolitan area, the greater metropolitan area, and the city proper. Metro Manila, the officially defined metropolitan area, is the capital region of the Philippines, and includes the much larger Quezon City and the Makati Central Business District.

The Pasig River flows through the middle of Manila, dividing it into northern and southern sections. The city comprises 16 administrative districts and is divided into six political districts for the purposes of representation in the Congress of the Philippines and the election of city council members. In 2018, the Globalization and World Cities Research Network listed Manila as an "Alpha-" global city, and ranked it seventh in economic performance globally and second regionally, while the Global Financial Centres Index ranks Manila 79th in the world. Additionally, artists and poets romantically compared it to Jerusalem in the frequency it endured wars and in its faith. Manila is also the world's second most natural disaster-exposed capital city after Tokyo. Furthermore, land subsidence and sea-level rise driven by climate change are challenges that the city will face in the future.

== Etymology ==
The name Manila is derived from the Filipino term Maynilà, which is commonly interpreted as either "where indigo plants are abundant" (may nilà) or "where nilad plants are abundant" (may nilad).

=== May nilà ===
Nilà is derived from the Sanskrit word nīla (नील), which refers to indigo dye and, by extension, to several plant species from which this natural dye can be extracted. The name Maynilà was probably bestowed because of the indigo-yielding plants that grew in the area surrounding the settlement rather than because it was known as a settlement that traded in indigo dye. Indigo dye extraction only became an important economic activity in the area in the 18th century, several hundred years after Maynila settlement was founded and named. Maynilà eventually underwent a process of Hispanicization and adopted the Spanish name Manila.

=== May nilad ===
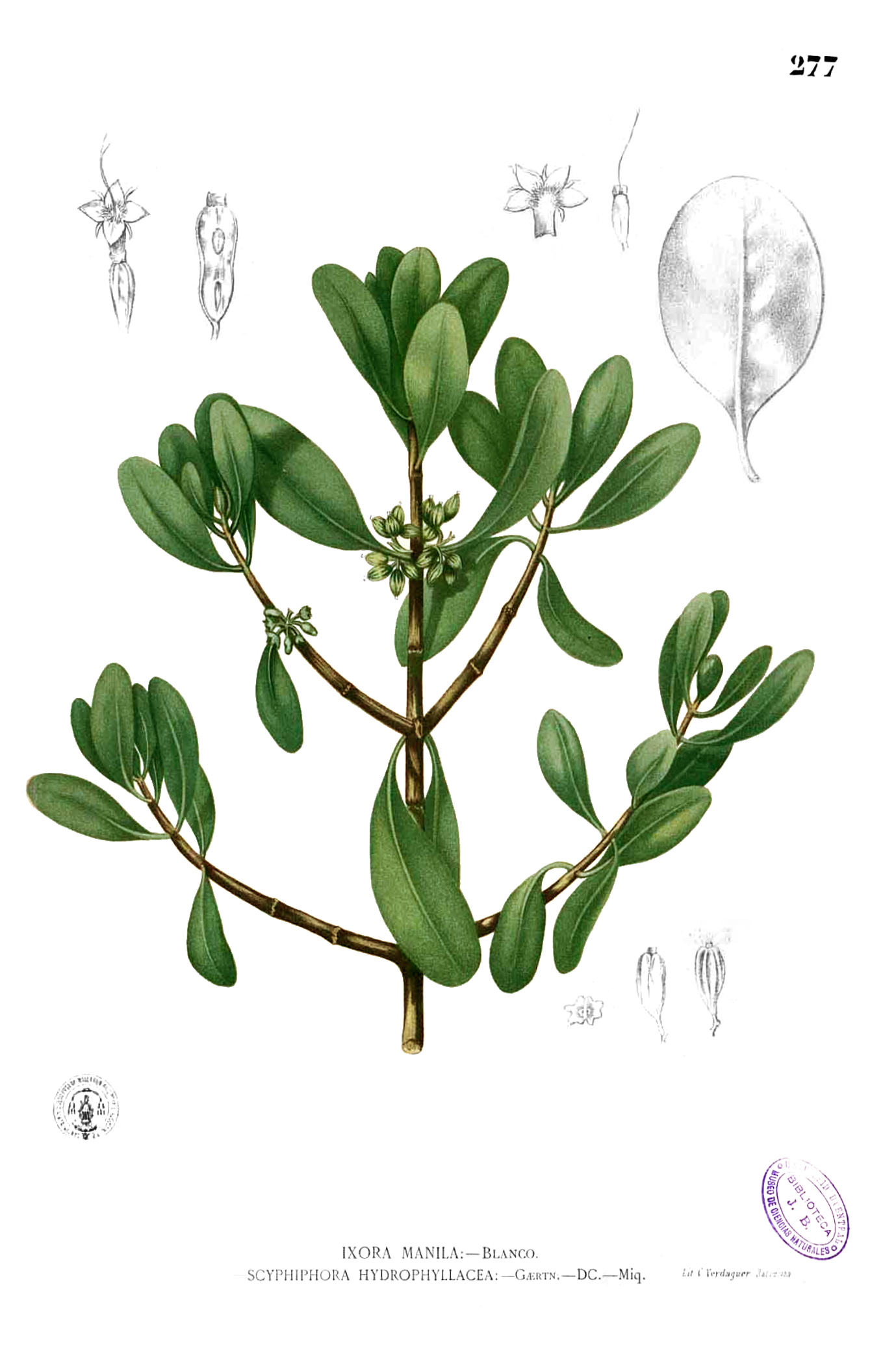
Plate depicting the "nilad" plant (Scyphiphora hydrophylacea), from Augustinian missionary Fray Francisco Manuel Blanco's botanical reference, Flora de Filipinas

This etymology arose from the observation that, in Tagalog, nilad or nilar refers to a shrub-like tree (Scyphiphora hydrophyllacea; formerly Ixora manila Blanco) that grows in or near mangrove swamps. However, Baumgartner explained that it is unlikely that native Tagalog speakers would completely drop the final consonant /d/ in nilad to arrive at the present form Maynilà. As an example, nearby Bacoor retains the final consonant of the old Tagalog word bakoód ("elevated piece of land"), even in old Spanish renderings of the placename (e.g., Vacol, Bacor). Linguist Vic Romero contends that it is actually not impossible for final consonant /d/ to shift into a glottal stop such as in mapalad to pinagpalà and hangád to hangà.

The earliest known reference to this etymology was in the third volume of John Ray's Historia Plantarum in 1704, originally lifted from the Herbarium aliarumque Stirpium in Insula Luzone Philippinarum primaria nascentium... by Fr. Georg Josef Kamel, and he mentioned that:

Nilad arbor mediocris, rarissimi recta, ligno folido, et compacto ut Molavin, ubi abundant Mangle, locum vocant Manglar, ita ubi nilad, Maynilad, unde corrupte Manila (Nilad is an average tree, very rare straight, leafy wood, and compact like Molavin, where Mangle abounds, the place is called Manglar, so where nilad (abounds), Maynilad, whence the corruption Manila).

Examples of later adoption of this etymology include the name of a local utility company, Maynilad Water Services, alternative name of Manila City Hall, Maharnilad, and the name of underpass close to it, Lagusnilad (meaning "Nilad Pass").

== History ==
=== Early history ===
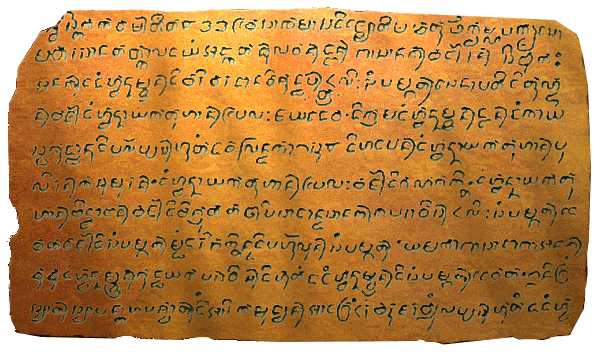
The Laguna Copperplate Inscription is the oldest historical record in the Philippines. It has the first historical reference to Tondo and dates back to Saka 822 (c. 900).

The earliest evidence of human life around present-day Manila is the nearby Angono Petroglyphs, which are dated to around 3000 BC. Negritos, the aboriginal inhabitants of the Philippines, lived across the island of Luzon, where Manila is located, before Malayo-Polynesians arrived and assimilated them.

Maynila, along with Tondo, were active trade partners with the Song and Yuan dynasties of China and flourished during the mid to later period of the Ming dynasty. According to a Japanese encyclopedia Wakan Sansai Zue, Luzon or Lusong (Maynila) was referred to as a "kingdom" south of Taiwan.

During the 14th century, then-Hindu Brunei called "Pon-i", as reported in the Chinese annals Nanhai zhi, invaded Malilu 麻裏蘆 (claimed by various scholars to be the present-day Manila) as it also administered Sarawak and Sabah, as well as the Philippine kingdoms of: Butuan, Sulu, Ma-i (Mindoro or Laguna), Shahuchong 沙胡重 (present-day Zamboanga), Yachen 啞陳 (Oton), and 文杜陵 Wenduling (present-day Mindanao, Bintulu or Mindoro). In 1365 both Hindu Brunei and Manila was conquered by the Hindu Majapahit Empire, therein they named Manila as Selurong (षेलुरोङ्) in Sanskrit texts.

Afterwards, Manila was a fortified settlement and trading quarter on the shore of the Pasig River. Upon the conversion of Brunei from Hinduism to Islam, Manila also followed by the 16th century, as the Bruneian royal family also intermarried with Manila's royal family, as can be gleaned by the personage of Rajah Matanda who was simultaneously king of Manila while being a great-grandson of Sultan Bolkiah of Brunei. Under Sultan Bolkiah's dynasty it was known as Kota Seludong (كوتا سلودوڠ).

=== Spanish colonial era ===
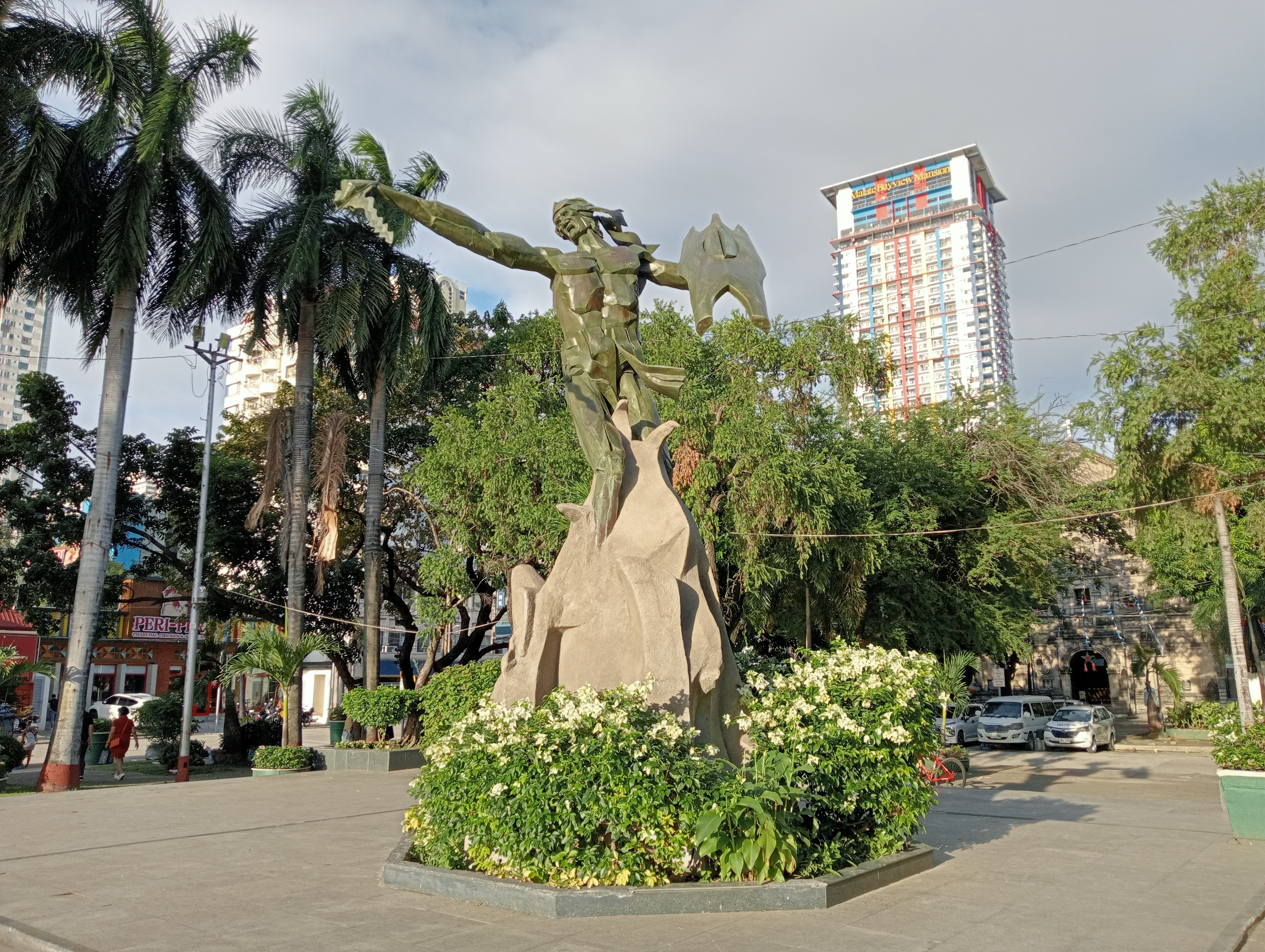
Statue of Rajah Sulayman in Manila, Sulayman was the Crown Prince of the Kingdom of Maynila was the commander of the Tagalog forces in the battle of Manila of 1570 against Spanish forces.

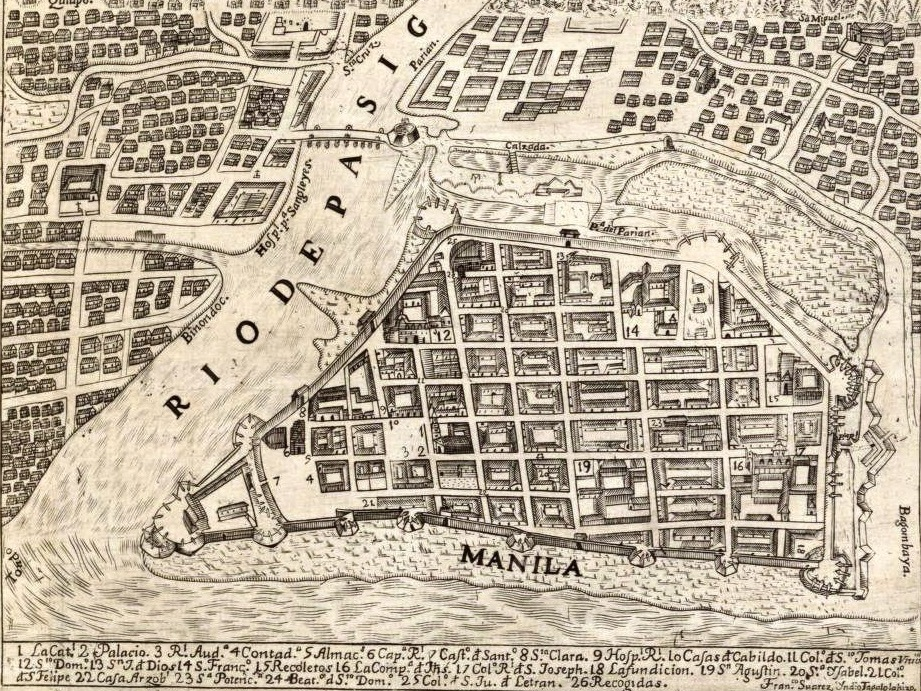
1734 map of the Walled City of Manila. The city was planned according to the Laws of the Indies.

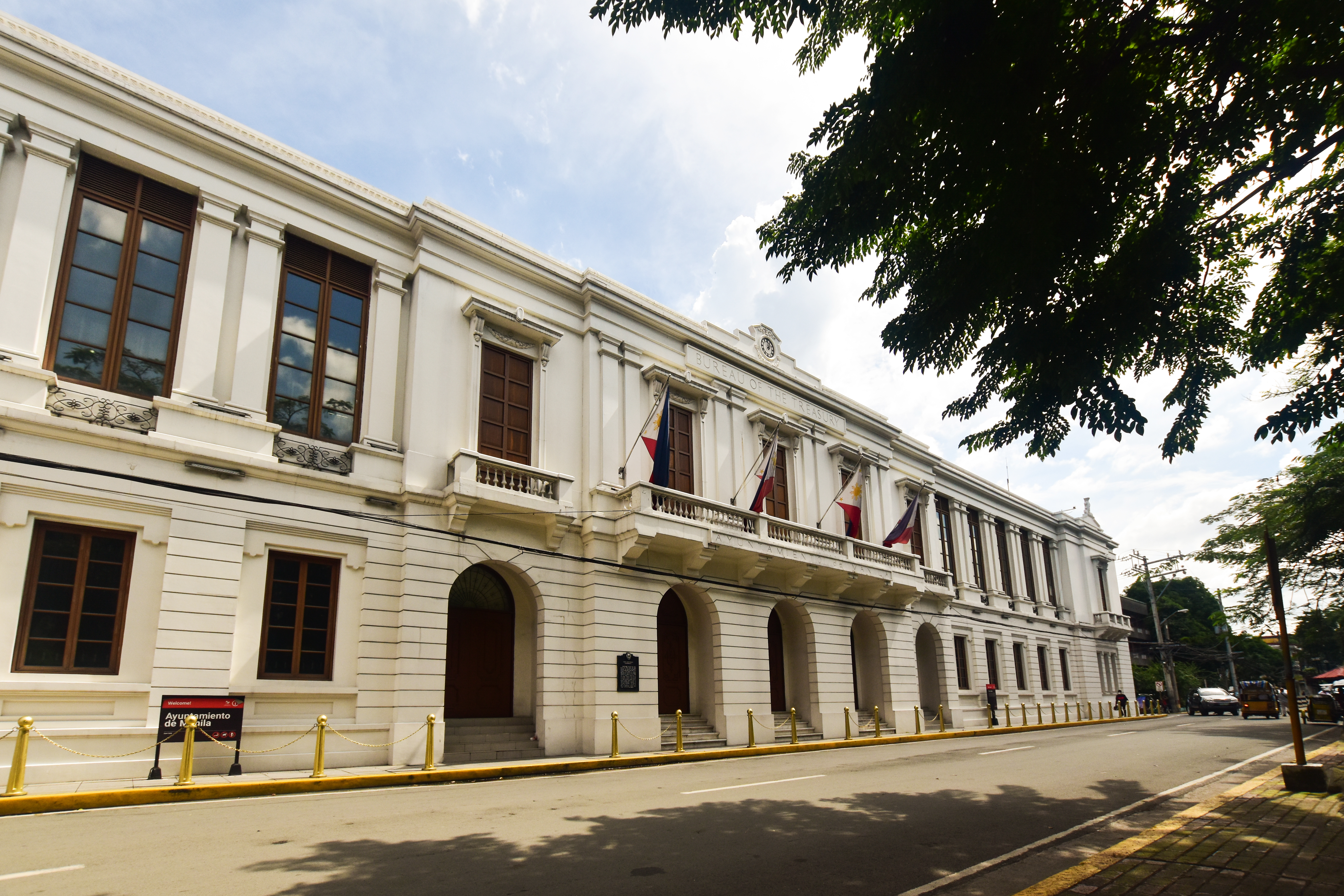
Ayuntamiento de Manila served as the City Hall during the Spanish Colonial Period.

On June 24, 1571, conquistador Miguel López de Legazpi arrived in Manila and declared it a territory of New Spain, establishing a city council in what is now Intramuros district. Inspired by the Reconquista, he took advantage of a territorial conflict between Hindu Tondo and Islamic Manila to justify expelling or converting Bruneian Muslim colonists who supported Manila while his Mexican grandson Juan de Salcedo had a romantic relationship with Kandarapa, a princess of Tondo. López de Legazpi had the local royalty executed or exiled after the failure of the Conspiracy of the Maharlikas, a plot in which an alliance of datus, rajahs, Japanese merchants, and the Sultanate of Brunei would band together to execute the Spaniards, along with their Latin American recruits and Visayan allies.

The victorious Spaniards made Manila the capital of the Spanish East Indies and of the Philippines, which their empire would control for the next three centuries. The city was founded by several European Spaniards and Mestizo Mexicans and even was garrisoned by 400 Native American Tlaxcalans who accompanied Salcedo from Cebu and were given pensions. In 1574, Manila was besieged by the Chinese pirate Lim Hong, who was thwarted by local inhabitants. Upon Spanish settlement, Manila was immediately made, by papal decree, a suffragan of the Archdiocese of Mexico. By royal decree of Philip II of Spain, Manila was put under the spiritual patronage of Saint Pudentiana and Our Lady of Guidance. (Note: This was spurred by a locally found sacred image, i.e., a Black Madonna of unknown origin; one theory is that it is from Portuguese-Macau, another is that it is a Tantric goddess and this was worshiped by the natives in a Pagan-Hindu manner and had survived Islamic iconoclasm by the Sultanate of Brunei. This image was interpreted to be of Marian nature, and it was found during the Miguel de Legazpi expedition and eventually, a Mexican hermit built a chapel around that image.) After the conquest of Manila from its Muslim aristocracy; the Spanish and Mexican conquistadors were awarded encomiendas with Esteban Rodríguez de Figueroa holding an encomienda near Manila; tribute figures not recorded. The other one is Juan Maldonado, another Mexican an early encomendero; of whom limited data survives. In the meantime, the Muslim aristocracy of Manila converted or fled, one such was Datuk Manila who fled to the Sultanate of Malacca where he became a Wali or Islamic Saint. In the meantime, the Spanish and Mexicans renamed Manila and Luzon island as the Kingdom of New Castille ("Novum Regnum de Castilæ" - In Latin).

Manila became famous for its role in the Manila–Acapulco galleon trade, which lasted for more than two centuries and brought goods from Europe, Africa, and Hispanic America across the Pacific Islands to Southeast Asia, and vice versa. Silver that was mined in Mexico and Peru was exchanged for Chinese silk, Indian gems, and spices from Indonesia and Malaysia. Wine and olives grown in Europe and North Africa were shipped via Mexico to Manila. Crops native to the Americas like chilli, papaya, sweet potato, chayote et cetera were also introduced to Asia at this point from the Philippines, permanently shaping Asian cuisines since. Because of the Ming ban on trade leveled against the Ashikaga shogunate in 1549, this resulted in the ban of all Japanese people from entering China and of Chinese ships from sailing to Japan. Manila became the only place where the Japanese and Chinese could openly trade.

The Manila Synod of 1582, the first Catholic Synod in the Philippines laid out the moral foundations for the incorporation of the archipelago into the Spanish Empire. Therein, the people had argued that native Filipinos already possess inherent dignity and sovereignty due to the precepts of Natural Law. And that any temporal power Spain has in incorporating the Philippines under the Spanish Empire is merely a servant to Spain's obligation or Supernatural Duty, mainly that is to save souls through faith in Christ; in which case they argued that it was just and moral to convert the Pagan (Hindu, Buddhist, and Animist) as well as Muslim; kingdoms of the Philippines into Christianity, in order to save their souls and that care should be taken to respect natives' rights and sovereignty, the best way of doing so, was to gently impose a more just and humane society under Christian Law which the Spanish did; by abolishing slavery, polygamy, polyandry, and infanticide, often practiced by the native Pagans and Muslims. Furthermore, Philippine society was materially enriched via trade with Latin-America, and if any other power were to serve as obstacles for the increased progress and cultivation of the Philippines, the Spanish are morally bound to wage Just War Theory against them. As a result of pacification campaigns, religious conversions, colonizations, and settlement by the Spanish in cooperation with the local natives, the proceedings of the Manila Synod of 1582 guaranteed native and Spanish rights and obligations amidst the Spanish-Mexican colonization of the Philippines and the later 1599 Philippines sovereignty referendums were proclaimed, and therein, assent was given by the governed Filipino peoples, in accepting Spanish sovereignty.

In 1606, upon the Spanish conquest of the Sultanate of Ternate, one of monopolizers of the growing of spice, the Spanish deported the ruler Sultan Said Din Burkat of Ternate, along with his clan and his entourage to Manila, where they were initially enslaved and eventually converted to Christianity. About 200 families of mixed Spanish-Mexican-Filipino and Moluccan-Indonesian-Portuguese descent from Ternate and Tidor followed him there at a later date.

The city attained great wealth due to its location at the confluence of the Silk Road, the Spice Route, and the Silver Way. Significant is the role of Armenians, who acted as merchant intermediaries that made trade between Europe and Asia possible in this area. France was the first nation to try financing its Asian trade with a partnership in Manila through Armenian khojas. The largest trade volume was in iron, and 1,000 iron bars were traded in 1721. In 1762, the city was captured by Great Britain as part of the Seven Years' War, in which Spain had recently become involved. The British occupied the city for twenty months from 1762 to 1764 in their attempt to capture the Spanish East Indies but they were unable to extend their occupation past Manila proper. Frustrated by their inability to take the rest of the archipelago, the British withdrew in accordance with the Treaty of Paris signed in 1763, which brought an end to the war. An unknown number of Indian soldiers known as sepoys, who came with the British, deserted and settled in nearby Cainta, Rizal.

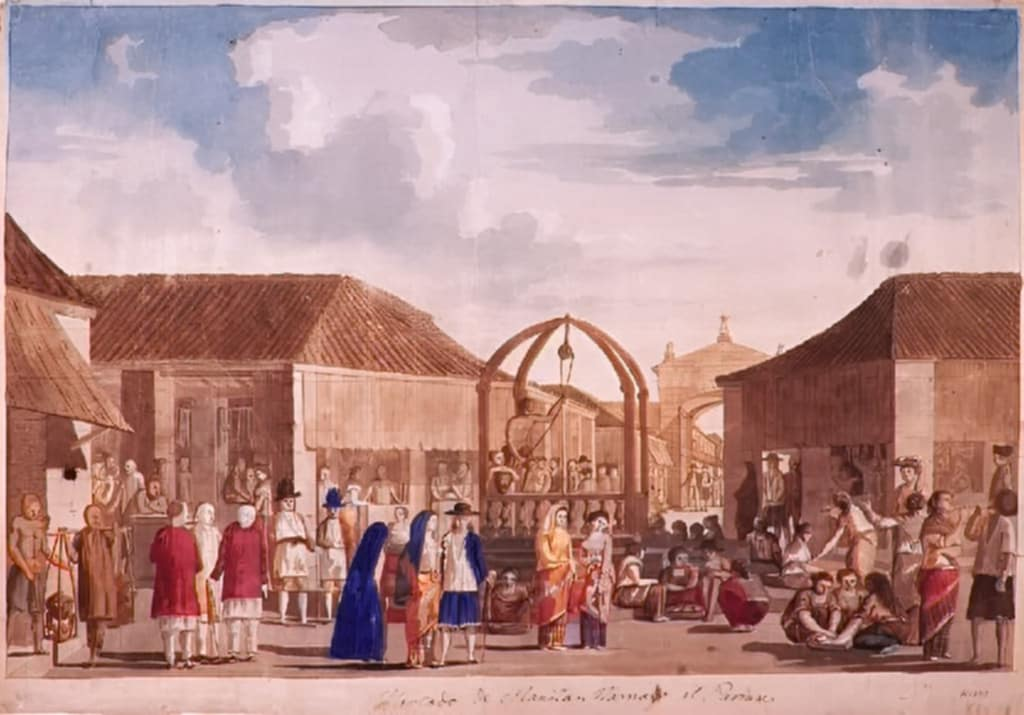
Parián, or Parián de Arroceros was an area outside of Intramuros built to house Sangley (Chinese) merchants during the Spanish rule.

The Chinese minority were punished for supporting the British, and the fortress city Intramuros, which was initially populated by 1,200 pure Spanish families and garrisoned by 400 Spanish troops, kept its cannons pointed at Binondo, the world's oldest Chinatown. The population of native Spaniards was concentrated in the southern part of Manila and in 1787, La Pérouse recorded one regiment of 1,300 Mexicans garrisoned at Manila, and they were also at Cavite, where ships from Spain's American colonies docked at, and at Ermita, which was thus-named because of a Mexican hermit who lived there. The Hermit-Priest's name was Juan Fernandez de Leon who was a Hermit in Mexico before relocating to Manila. Priests were not usually alone too since they often brought along Lay Brothers and Sisters. The years: 1603, 1636, 1644, 1654, 1655, 1670, and 1672; saw the deployment of 900, 446, 407, 821, 799, 708, and 667 Latin American soldiers from Mexico at Manila. The Philippines hosts the only Latin American established districts in Asia, with the Malate district hosting buildings mixing Mexican Baroque and Filipino Muslim Mudejar styles. The Spanish evacuated Ternate and settled Papuan refugees in Ternate, Cavite, which was named after their former homeland. In 1603, Manila was also home to 25,000 Chinese and housed 14,437 native (Malay-Filipino) families, as well as 3,528 mixed Spanish-Filipino families.

The rise of Spanish Manila marked the first time all hemispheres and continents were interconnected in a worldwide trade network, making Manila, alongside Mexico City and Madrid, the world's original set of global cities. A Spanish Jesuit priest commented due to the confluence of many foreign languages in Manila, the confessional in Manila was "the most difficult in the world". Juan de Cobo, another Spanish missionary of the 1600s, was so astonished by the commerce, cultural complexity, and ethnic diversity in Manila he wrote to his brethren in Mexico:

The diversity here is immense such that I could go on forever trying to differentiate lands and peoples. There are Castilians from all provinces. There are Portuguese and Italians; Dutch, Greeks and Canary Islanders, and Mexican Indians. There are slaves from Africa brought by the Spaniards [Through America], and others brought by the Portuguese [Through India]. There is an African Moor with his turban here. There are Javanese from Java, Japanese and Bengalese from Bengal. Among all these people are the Chinese whose numbers here are untold and who outnumber everyone else. From China there are peoples so different from each other, and from provinces as distant, as Italy is from Spain. Finally, of the mestizos, the mixed-race people here, I cannot even write because in Manila there is no limit to combinations of peoples with peoples. This is in the city where all the buzz is. (Remesal, 1629: 680–1)

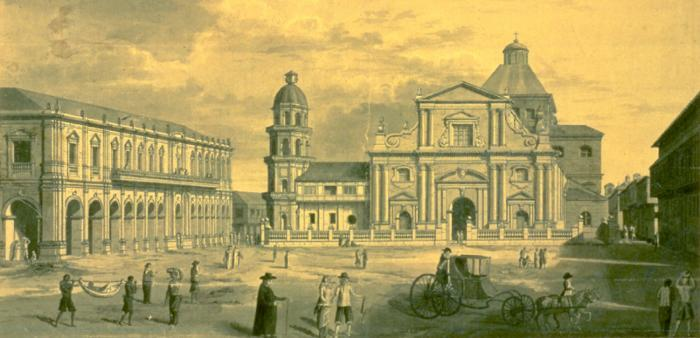
Manila Cathedral by Fernando Brambila, a member of the Malaspina Expedition during their stop in Manila in 1792.

After Mexico gained independence from Spain in 1821, the Spanish crown began to directly govern Manila. Under direct Spanish rule, banking, industry, and education flourished more than they had in the previous two centuries. The opening of the Suez Canal in 1869 facilitated direct trade and communications with Spain. The city's growing wealth and education attracted indigenous peoples, Negritos, Malays, Africans, Chinese, Indians, Arabs, Europeans, Latinos and Papuans from the surrounding provinces, and facilitated the rise of an ilustrado class who espoused liberal ideas, which became the ideological foundations of the Philippine Revolution, which sought independence from Spain. A revolt by Andrés Novales was inspired by the Spanish American wars of independence but the revolt itself was led by demoted Latin-American military officers stationed in the city from the newly independent nations of Mexico, Colombia, Venezuela, Peru, Chile, Argentina, and Costa Rica. Following the 1872 Cavite mutiny and the Propaganda Movement, the Philippine Revolution began; Manila was among the first eight provinces to rebel and their role was commemorated on the Philippine Flag, on which Manila was represented by one of the eight rays of the symbolic sun.

=== American dominion era ===
After the 1898 Battle of Manila, Spain ceded the city to the United States. The First Philippine Republic based in nearby Bulacan fought against the Americans for control of the city. The Americans defeated the First Philippine Republic and captured its president Emilio Aguinaldo, who pledged allegiance to the U.S. on April 1, 1901. Upon drafting a new charter for Manila in June 1901, the U.S. officially recognized that the city of Manila consisted of Intramuros and the surrounding areas. The new charter proclaimed Manila was composed of eleven municipal districts: Binondo, Ermita, Intramuros, Malate, Paco, Pandacan, Sampaloc, San Miguel, Santa Ana, Santa Cruz, and Tondo. The Catholic Church recognized five parishes as parts of Manila; Gagalangin, Trozo, Balic-Balic, Santa Mesa, and Singalong; and Balut and San Andres were later added.

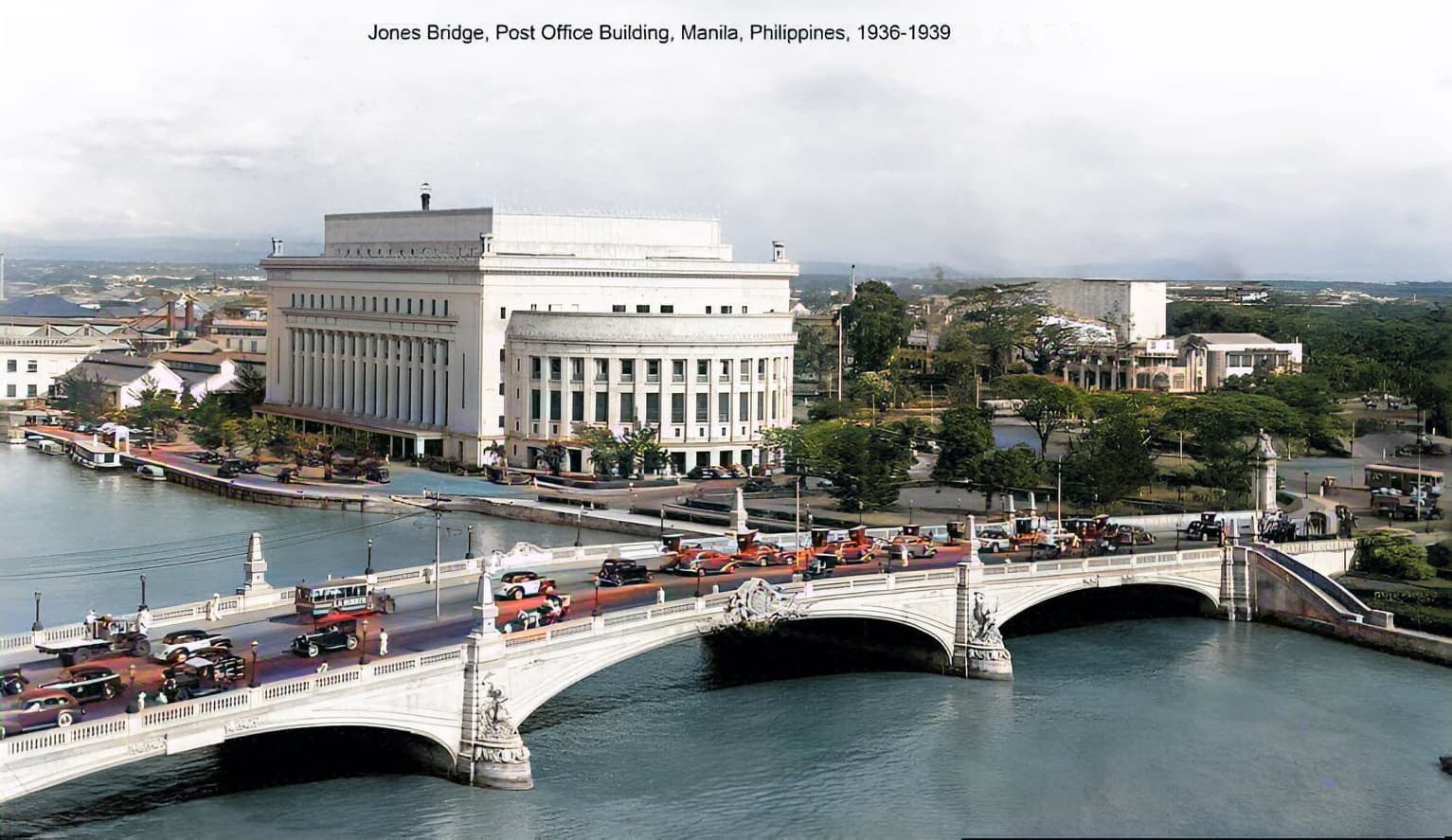
Jones Bridge in the 1930s

Under U.S. control, a new, civilian-oriented Insular Government headed by Governor-General William Howard Taft invited city planner Daniel Burnham (Founder of the "City Beautiful Movement") to adapt Manila to modern needs. The 1905 Burnham Plan of Manila recommended improving the city's transit systems by creating diagonal arteries radiating from the new central civic district into areas at the outskirts of the city. It included the development of a road system, the use of waterways for transportation, and the beautification of Manila with waterfront improvements and construction of parks, parkways, and buildings.

The planned buildings included a government center occupying all of Wallace Field, which extends from Rizal Park to the present Taft Avenue. The Philippine capitol was to rise at the Taft Avenue end of the field, facing the sea. Along with buildings for government bureaus and departments, it would form a quadrangle with a central lagoon and a monument to José Rizal at the other end of the field. Of Burnham's proposed government centers in Luneta, only three units—the Legislative Building, and the buildings of the Finance and Agricultural Departments—were completed before World War II began, with the war's onset, also destroying the former gracefulness that was the fruit of the City Beautiful Movement.

Around the same time, the First Provincial Council of Manila (1907), was held, wherein the Catholic church in the Philippines reaffirmed their loyalty to Catholicism by requesting restoration of their liturgical rights under Spain having proved it by reverting from, converting from, or resisting conversion to, new American colonially imposed Protestantism and Freemasonry, they as well as reported to the church the expansion of Catholic Christianity in Mindanao at the expense of Sunni Islam. The Pope, noting that, reinstated the Spanish-Empire exclusive Cerulean Indult, the exclusive right to wear Marian (Light blue), and following the precedent set by the Philippines, restored it to select former Spanish territories as well but making it mostly only exclusive to the former Spanish Empire with some exceptions.

Gallery of Manila during the American era

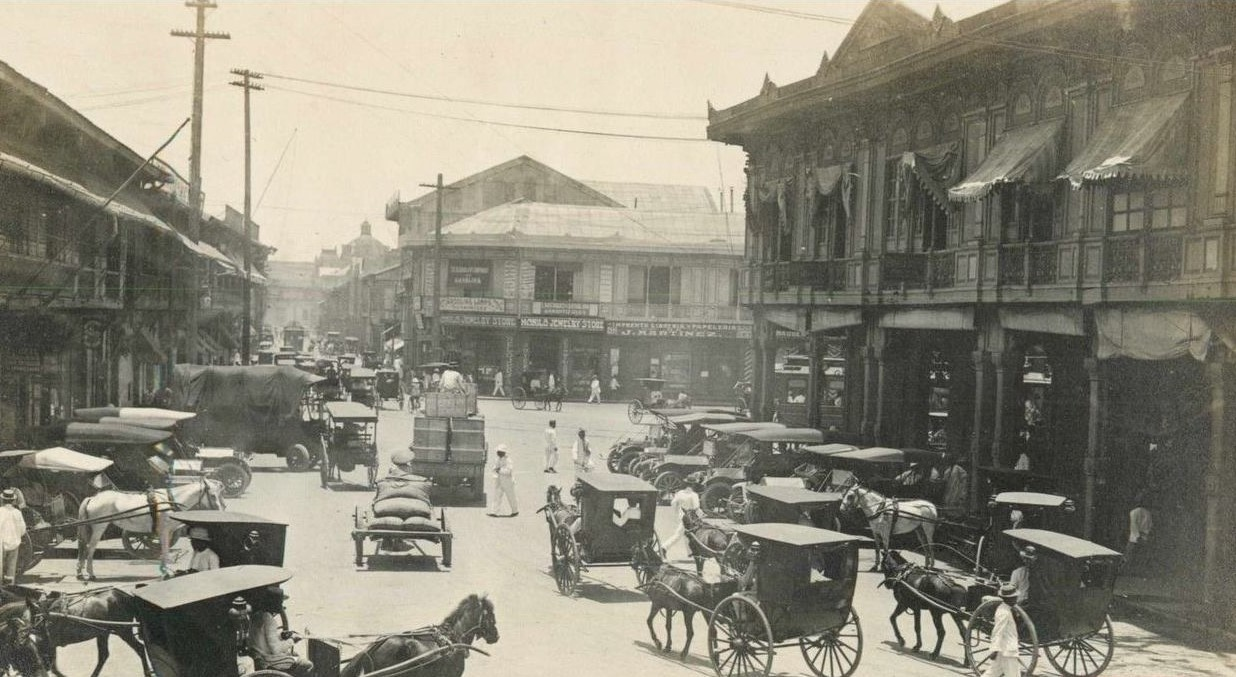
Plaza Moraga in the early 1900s

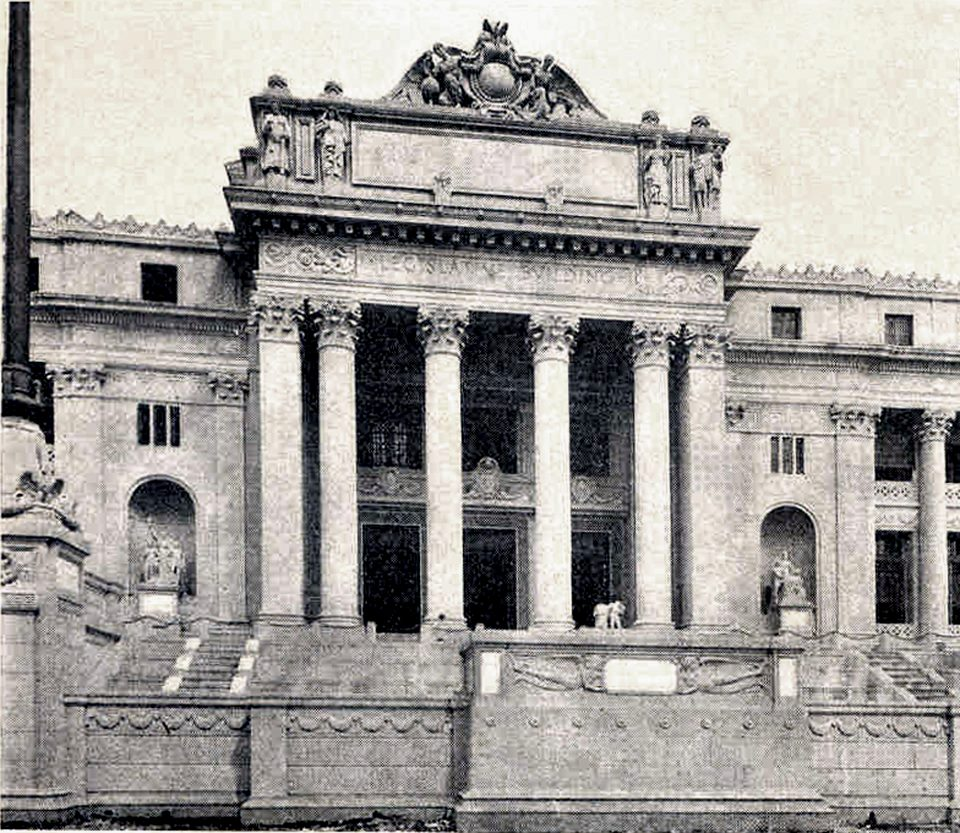
The Old Legislative Building featuring a Neoclassical style architecture.

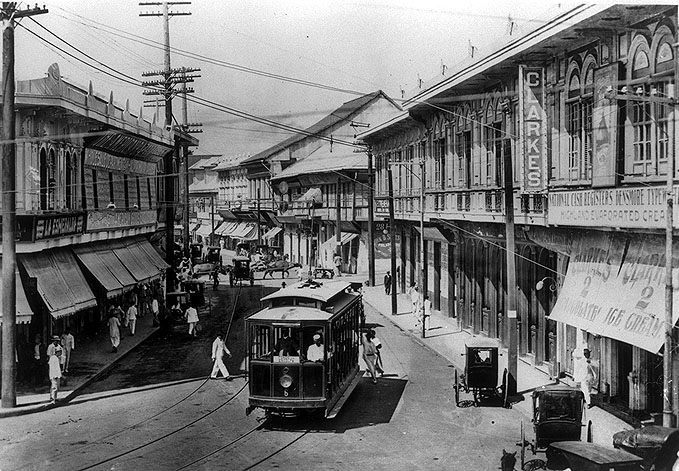
The tranvía running along Escolta Street during the American period

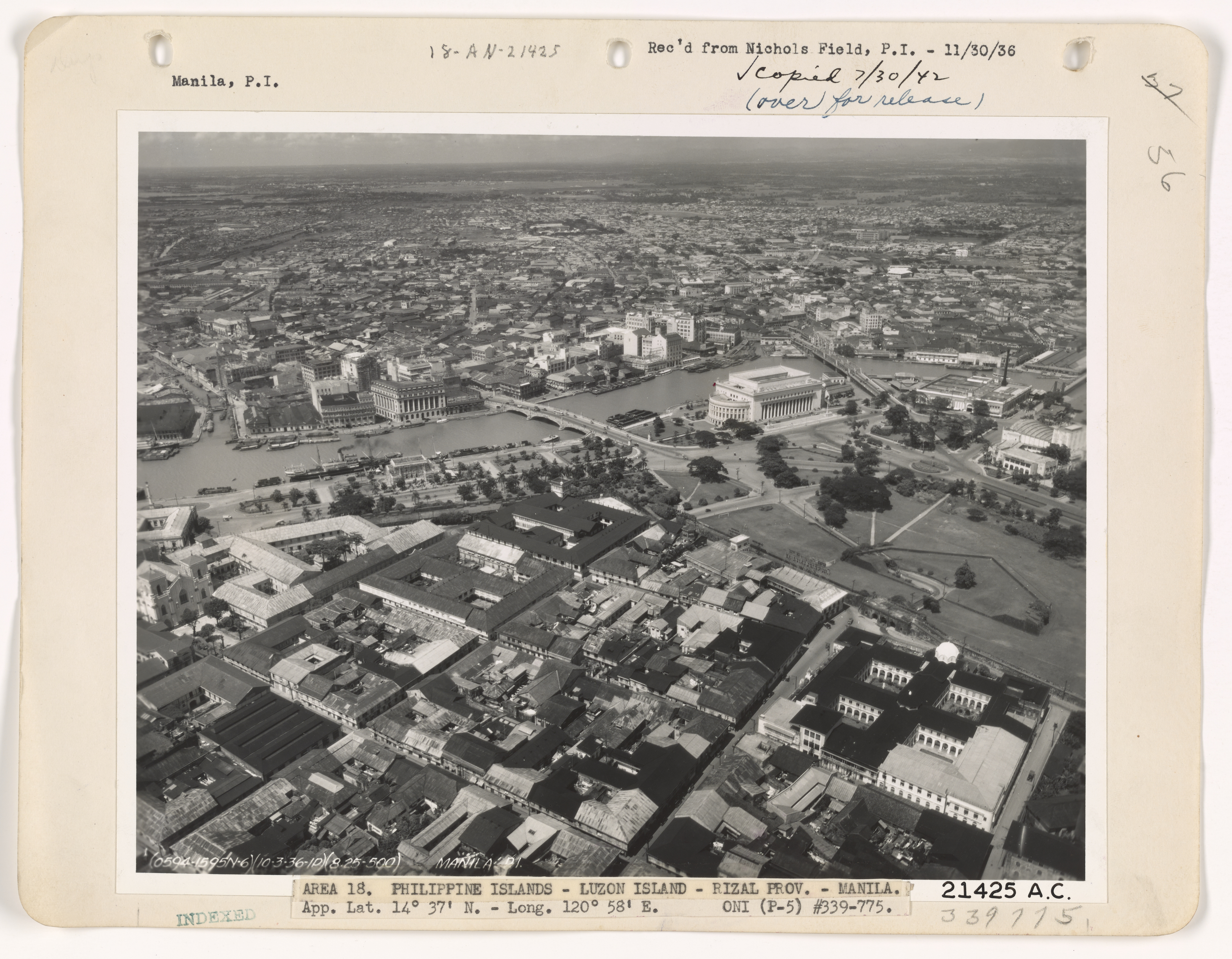
Aerial view of Manila, 1936

=== Japanese occupation ===
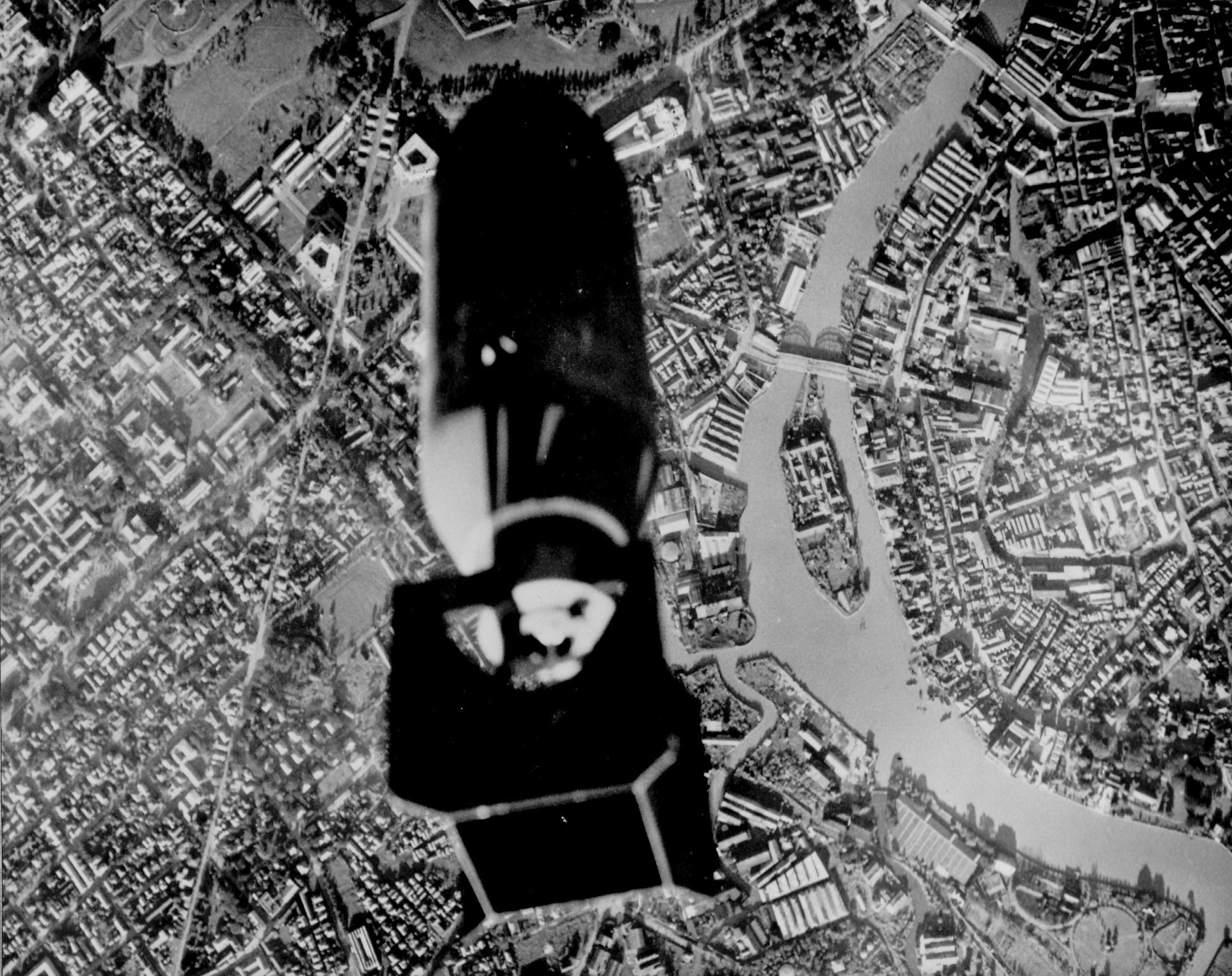
A TBF-1 Avenger from USS Essex dropping a bomb over the Pasig River in Manila, targeting the dockyard, November 14, 1944

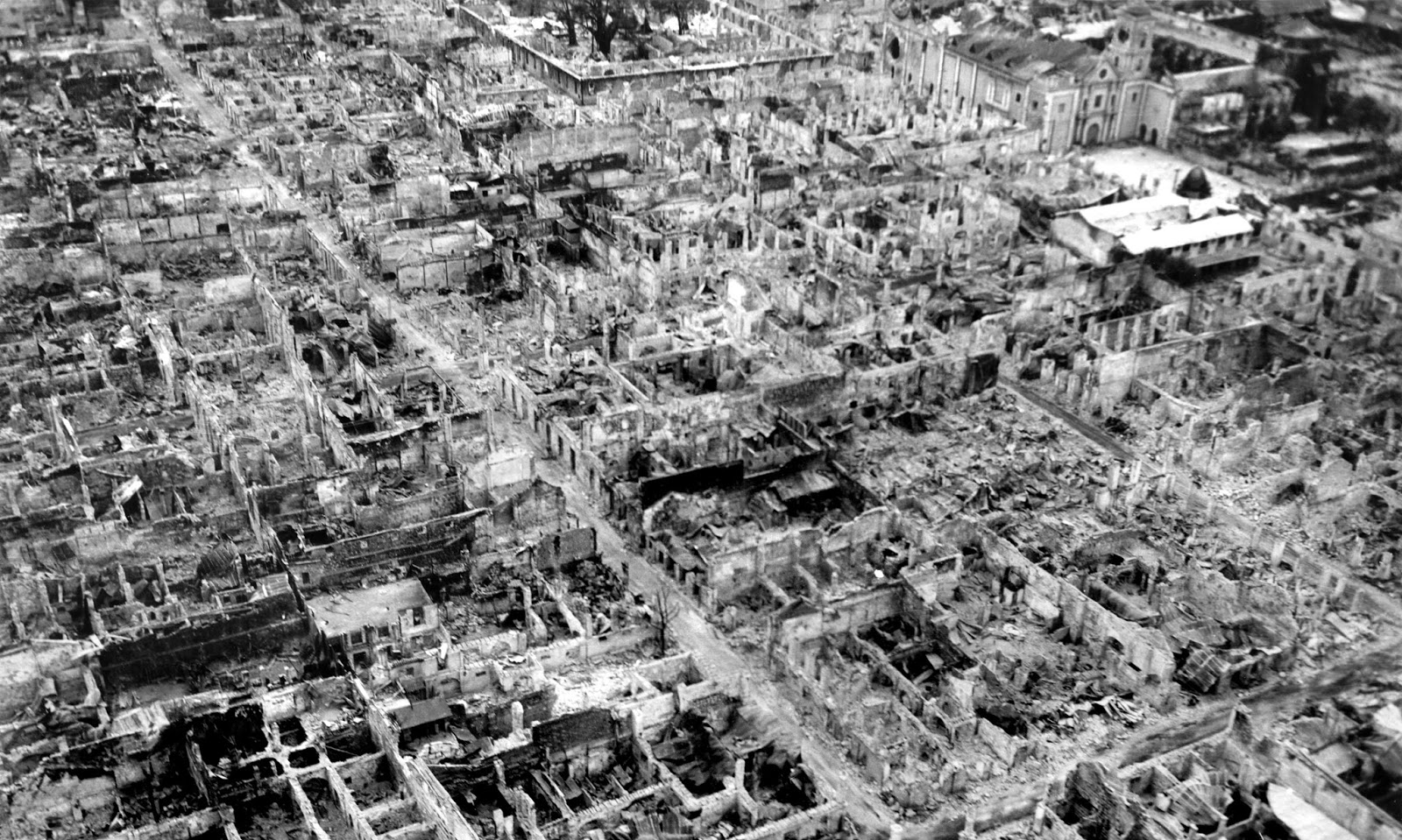
Manila destroyed during the Battle of Manila of the Americans and Japanese during World War II.

During the Japanese occupation of the Philippines, American soldiers were ordered to withdraw from Manila and all military installations were removed by December 24, 1941. Two days later, General Douglas MacArthur declared Manila an open city to prevent further death and destruction but Japanese warplanes continued bombing the city. Japanese forces occupied Manila on January 2, 1942.

From February 3 to March 3, 1945, Manila was the site of one of the bloodiest battles in the Pacific theater of World War II. Under orders of Japanese Rear Admiral Sanji Iwabuchi, retreating Japanese forces killed about 100,000 Filipino civilians and perpetrated the mass rape of women in February. At the end of the war, Manila had suffered from heavy bombardment and became the second-most-destroyed city of World War II. Manila was recaptured by American and Philippine troops. The destruction the war wrought against Manila, made National Artist, Nick Joaquin Lament:

"We are a city of layers. Every time we walk through the streets of Manila, we are treading upon the dust of several different cities that have flourished and perished on this same site. There was the Manila of the Rajahs, the Manila of the Conquistadors, the Manila of the Viceroys, and the Manila of the Commonwealth. Each was destroyed, and each was buried, and upon its grave the next one rose."

— Nicomedes Márquez Joaquín, Manila: Sin City and Other Chronicles (1977)

=== Postwar and independence era ===
After the war, reconstruction efforts started. Buildings like Manila City Hall, the Legislative Building (now the National Museum of Fine Arts), and Manila Post Office were rebuilt, and roads and other infrastructures were repaired. In 1948, President Elpidio Quirino moved the seat of government of the Philippines to Quezon City, a new capital in the suburbs and fields northeast of Manila, which was created in 1939 during the administration of President Manuel L. Quezon. The move ended any implementation of the Burnham Plan's intent for the government center to be at Luneta. When Arsenio Lacson became the first elected Mayor of Manila in 1952, before which all mayors were appointed, Manila underwent a "Golden Age", regaining its pre-war moniker "Pearl of the Orient". After Lacson's term in the 1950s, Manila was led by Antonio Villegas for most of the 1960s. Ramon Bagatsing was mayor from 1972 until the 1986 People Power Revolution.

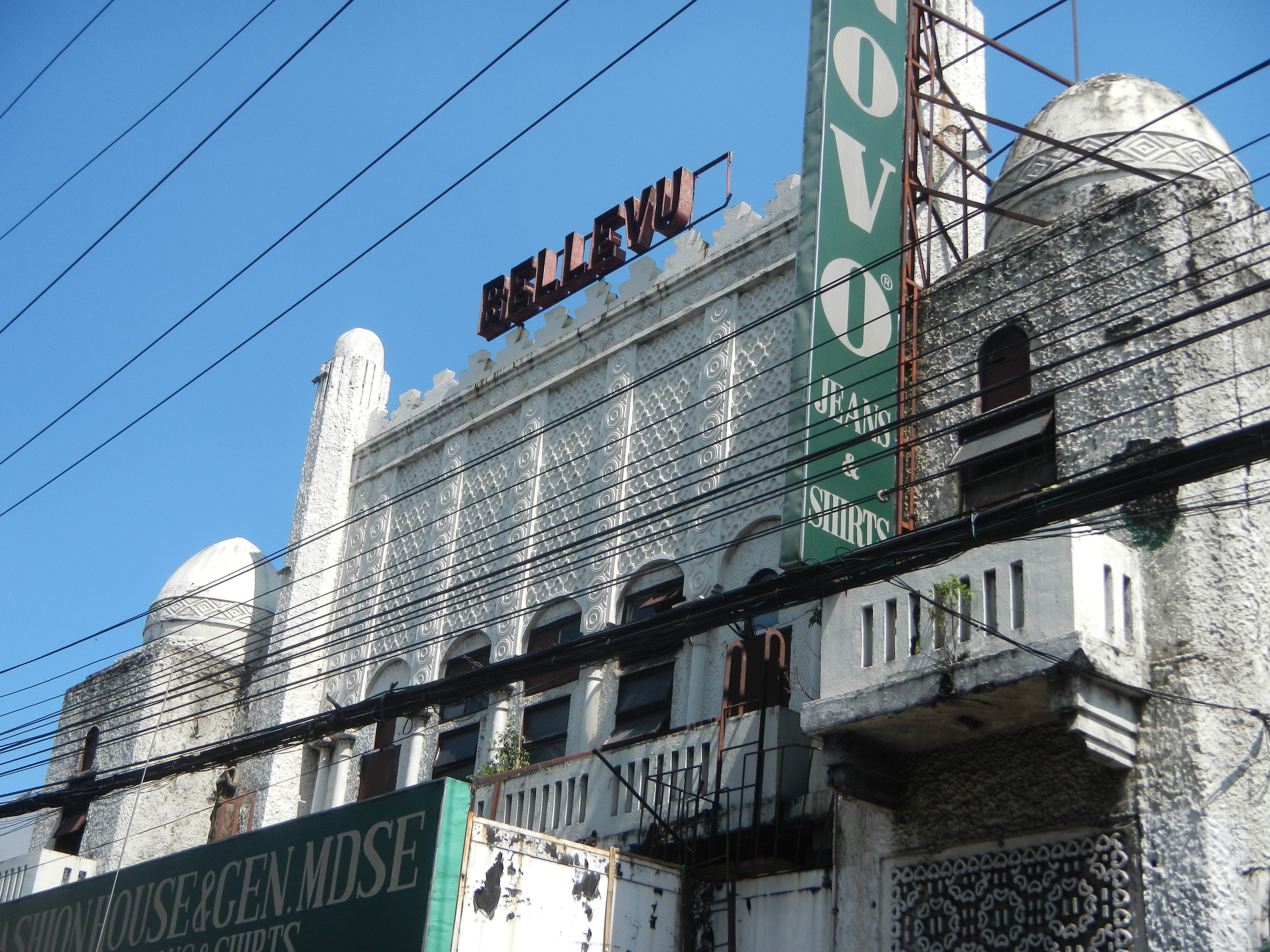
The Bellevue Theater, a priceless cultural artifact one of the few survivors of Preworld War 2 buildings still intact. It shows architectural influences that only uniquely converged in the Philippines. Mainly American Art Deco mixed with Filipino Christianized Islamic Mudejar and Mexican Baroque.

During the administration of Ferdinand Marcos, Metro Manila was created as an integrated unit with the enactment of Presidential Decree No. 824 on November 7, 1975. The area encompassed four cities and thirteen adjoining towns as a separate regional unit of government. On June 24, 1976, the 405th anniversary of the city's founding, President Marcos reinstated Manila as the capital of the Philippines for its historical significance as the seat of government since the Spanish Period. At the same time, Marcos designated his wife Imelda Marcos as the first governor of Metro Manila. She started the rejuvenation of the city and re-branded Manila the "City of Man".

=== Martial Law era ===
Many of the key events of the historical period from the first major protests against the administration of Ferdinand Marcos in January 1970 until his ouster in February 1986 took place within the city of Manila. The first, the January 26, 1970, State of the Nation Address Protest which kicked off the "First Quarter Storm", took place at the Legislative Building (now the National Museum of Fine Arts) on Padre Burgos Avenue, and the very last saw the Marcos family flee Malacañang Palace into exile in the United States.

The beginning weeks of Ferdinand Marcos' second term as president was marked by the 1969 balance of payments crisis, which economists trace to his first term tactic of using foreign loans to fund massive government projects in an effort to curry votes. In protest, protest groups led mostly by students decided to picket Marcos' 1970 State of the Nation Address at the legislative building on January 26. The protesters were initially bickering amongst themselves because both moderate reformist and radical activist groups were present and fighting to gain control of the stage. But all of them, regardless of advocacy, were violently dispersed by the Philippine Constabulary. This was followed by six more major protests which were violently dispersed, from the end of January until March 17, 1970.

Instability continued the following year, with the most significant incident being the August 1971 Plaza Miranda bombing caused nine deaths and injured 95 others, including many prominent Liberal Party politicians including incumbent Senators Jovito Salonga, Eddie Ilarde, Eva Estrada-Kalaw, and Liberal Party president Gerardo Roxas, Sergio Osmeña Jr., Manila 2nd District Councilor Ambrosio "King" Lorenzo Jr., and Congressman Ramon Bagatsing who was the party's mayoral candidate for Manila.

Marcos reacted to the bombing by blaming the still nascent Communist Party of the Philippines and then suspending of the writ of Habeas Corpus. The suspension is noted for forcing many members of the moderate opposition, including figures like Edgar Jopson, to join the ranks of the radicals. In the aftermath of the bombing, Marcos lumped all of the opposition together and referred to them as communists, and many former moderates fled to the mountain encampments of the radical opposition to avoid being arrested by Marcos' forces. Those who became disenchanted with the excesses of the Marcos administration and wanted to join the opposition after 1971 often joined the ranks of the radicals, simply because they represented the only group vocally offering opposition to the Marcos government.

Marcos' declaration of martial law in September 1972 saw the immediate shutdown of all media not approved by Marcos, including Quezon City media outlets, including the Manila-based Manila Times, Philippines Free Press, The Manila Tribune and the Philippines Herald. At the same time, it saw the arrest of many students, journalists, academics, and politicians who were considered political threats to Marcos, many of them residents of the City of Manila. The first one was Ninoy Aquino who was arrested just before midnight on September 22 while at a hotel on UN Avenue preparing for a senate committee session the following morning.

About 400 prominent critics of the Marcos administration were jailed in the first few hours of September 23 alone, and eventually about 70,000 individuals became Political detainees under the Marcos dictatorship - most of them arrested without warrants, which is why they were called detainees rather than prisoners. At least 11,103 of them have since been officially recognized by the Philippine government as having been extensively tortured and abused. and in April 1973 Pamantasan ng Lungsod ng Maynila student journalist Liliosa Hilao became the first of these detainees to be killed while in prison - one of 3,257 known extrajudicial killings during the last 14 years of Marcos' presidency.

In 1975, Marcos formalized the creation of a region called Metropolitan Manila, incorporating the four cities of Manila, Quezon City, Caloocan, Pasay, and the thirteen municipalities of Las Piñas, Makati, Malabon, Mandaluyong, Marikina, Muntinlupa, Navotas, Parañaque, Pasig, Pateros, San Juan, Taguig, and Valenzuela. And then he appointed his wife Imelda Marcos, who had been angered by the revelation of his dalliances during the Dovie Beams scandal, Governor of Metro Manila.

Despite Marcos' declaration of martial law, poverty and other social issues persisted, so even with the military in his control, Marcos could not hold back the unrest. A major turning point was reached in Tondo in the form of the 1975 La Tondeña Distillery strike which was one of the first major open acts of resistance against the Marcos dictatorship which paved the way for similar protest actions elsewhere in the country. From then, Manila continued to be a center of resistance activity; youth and student demonstrators repeatedly clashed with the police and military.

Another major protest was the September 1984 Welcome Rotonda protest dispersal at the border of Manila and Quezon City, which came in the wake of the Aquino assassination the year before in 1983. International pressure had forced Marcos to give the press more freedom, so coverage exposed Filipinos to how opposition figures including 80-year-old former Senator Lorenzo Tañada and 71-year-old Manila Times founder Chino Roces were waterhosed despite their frailty and how student leader Fidel Nemenzo (later Chancellor of the University of the Philippines Diliman) was shot nearly to death.

=== The People Power Revolution ===
In late 1985, in the face of escalating public discontent and under pressure from foreign allies, Marcos called a snap election with more than a year left in his term, selecting Arturo Tolentino as his running mate. The opposition to Marcos united behind Ninoy's widow Corazon Aquino and her running mate, Salvador Laurel. The elections were held on February 7, 1986, an exercise marred by widespread reports of violence and tampering of election results.

On February 16, 1986, Corazon Aquino held the "Tagumpay ng Bayan" (People's Victory) rally at Luneta Park, announcing a civil disobedience campaign and calling for her supporters to boycott publications and companies which were associated with Marcos or any of his cronies. The event was attended by a crowd of about two million people. Aquino's camp began making preparations for more rallies, and Aquino herself went to Cebu to rally more people to their cause.

In the aftermath of the election and the revelations of irregularities, Juan Ponce Enrile and the Reform the Armed Forces Movement (RAM) - a cabal of disgruntled officers of the Armed Forces of the Philippines (AFP) - set into motion a coup attempt against Ferdinand and Imelda Marcos. Enrile and RAM's coup was quickly uncovered, which prompted Enrile to ask for the support of Philippine Constabulary chief Fidel Ramos. Ramos agreed to join Enrile but even so, their combined forces were trapped in Camp Crame and Camp Aguinaldo, and were about to be overrun by Marcos loyalist forces.

Discovering what was happening, the forces which had been organizing Aquino's civil disobedience campaign went to the stretch of Epifanio De Los Santos Avenue (EDSA) between the two camps, beginning to form a human barricade to keep Marcos loyalist forces from attacking. The crowd grew even larger when Ramos telephoned Manila Cardinal Jaime Sin for help, and Sin went on Radyo Veritas to invite Catholics to join in protecting Enrile and Ramos. Seeing what was happening, multiple units of the Armed Forces of the Philippines defected from Marcos, with air units under the command of General Antonio Sotelo and Colonel Charles Hotchkiss, even performed calculated operations which included strafing the grounds of Malacañang palace with bullets and disabling gunships at nearby Villamor Airbase.

The Reagan administration eventually decided to offer Marcos a chance to flee into exile. Shortly after midnight on February 26, 1986, the Marcos Family fled Malacañang and were taken to Clark Airbase, after which they went into exile in Honolulu along with some select followers including Fabian Ver and Danding Cojuangco. Because the victory had been won by the civilians on the streets rather than the military, the event was dubbed the People Power revolution. Ferdinand Marcos' 21 years as President - and his 14 years as authoritarian leader - of the Philippines was over. After Manila has once again experienced a battle and surmounted another crisis, Nick Joaquin, famous National Artist for Literature then wrote:

"It almost seems as if every problem, every crisis, arises just to prove the aliveness of this city; continually destroyed and continually rebuilt, ever decaying and ever re-greening, Manila has survived for four hundred years and will surely survive for four hundred more. Because it is a city of our affections..."

— Nicomedes Márquez Joaquín, Manila, My Manila: A History for the Young (1988)

=== Contemporary ===
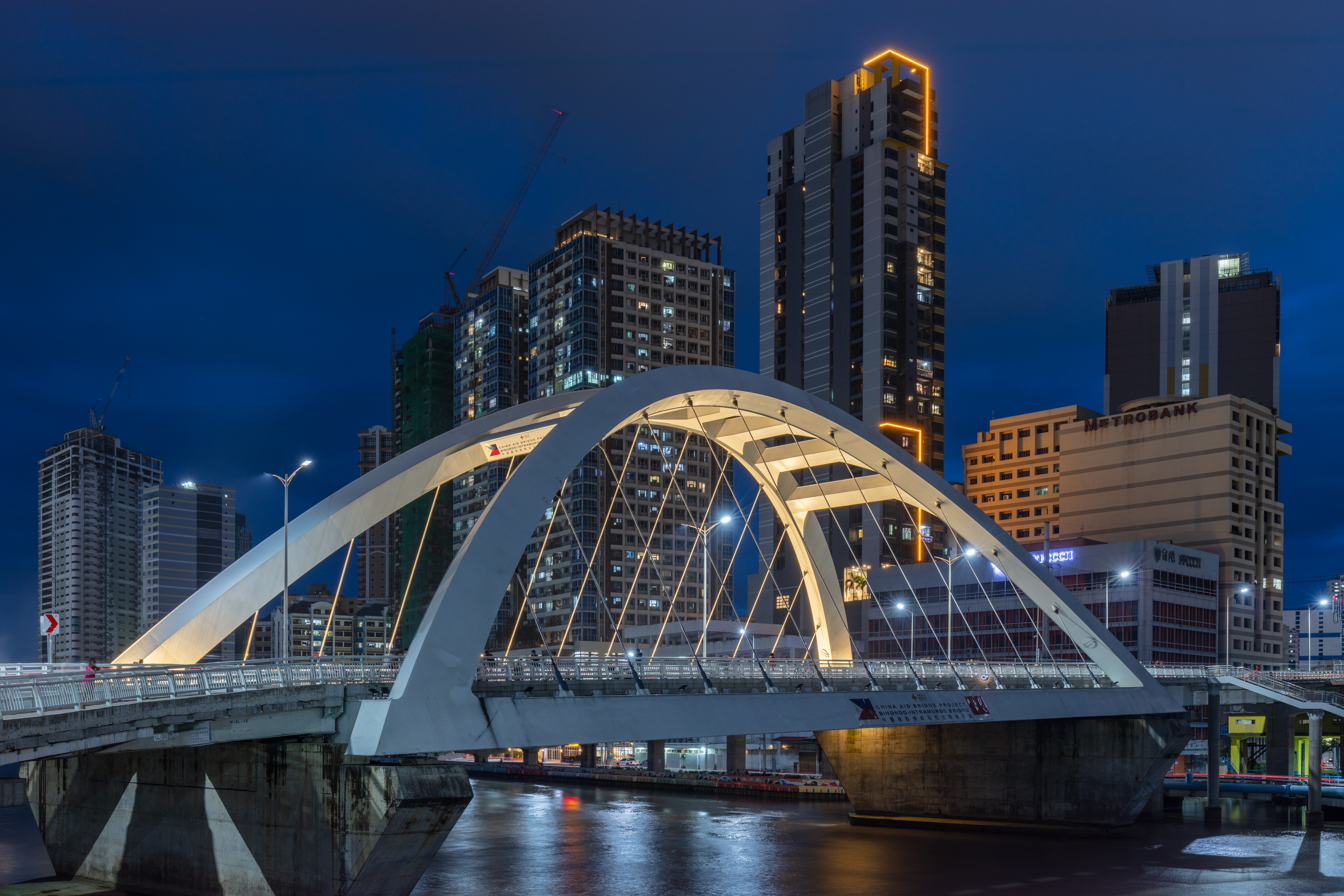
The Binondo–Intramuros Bridge, opened in 2022, connecting the districts of Binondo and Intramuros.

From 1986 to 1992, Mel Lopez was mayor of Manila, first due to presidential designation, before being elected in 1988. In 1992, Alfredo Lim was elected mayor, the first Chinese-Filipino to hold the office. He was known for his anti-crime crusades. Lim was succeeded by Lito Atienza, who served as his vice mayor, and was known for his campaign and slogan "Buhayin ang Maynila" (Revive Manila), which saw the establishment of several parks, and the repair and rehabilitation of the city's deteriorating facilities. He was the city's mayor for nine years before being termed out of office. Lim once again ran for mayor and defeated Atienza's son Ali in the 2007 city election, and immediately reversed all of Atienza's projects, which he said made little contribution to the improvements of the city. The relationship of both parties turned bitter, with them both contesting the 2010 city elections, which Lim won. Lim was sued by councilor Dennis Alcoreza on 2008 over human rights, he was charged with graft over the rehabilitation of public schools.

In 2012, DMCI Homes began constructing Torre de Manila, which became controversial for ruining the sight line of Rizal Park. The tower became known as "Terror de Manila" and the "national photobomber", and became a sensationalized heritage issue. In 2017, the National Historical Commission of the Philippines erected a "comfort woman" statue on Roxas Boulevard, causing Japan to express regret about the statue's erection despite the healthy relationship between Japan and the Philippines.

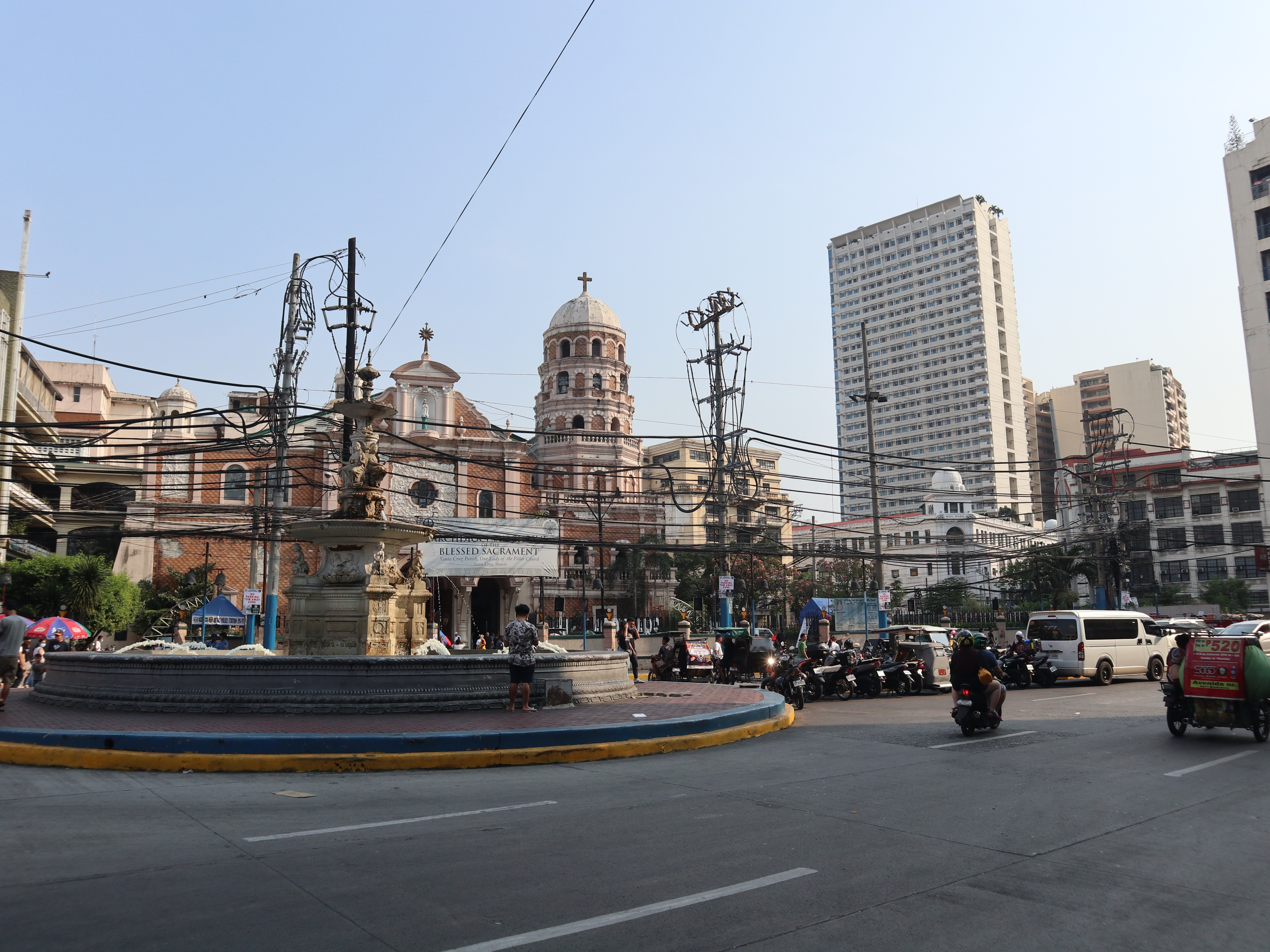
Santa Cruz district

In the 2013 election, former President Joseph Estrada succeeded Lim as the city's mayor. During his term, Estrada allegedly paid ₱5 billion in city debts and increased the city's revenues. In 2015, in line with President Noynoy Aquino's administration progress, the city became the most-competitive city in the Philippines. In the 2016 elections, Estrada narrowly won over Lim. Throughout Estrada's term, numerous Filipino heritage sites were demolished, gutted, or approved for demolition; these include the post-war Santa Cruz Building, Capitol Theater, El Hogar, Magnolia Ice Cream Plant, and Rizal Memorial Stadium. Some of these sites were saved after the intervention of governmental cultural agencies and heritage advocate groups. In May 2019, Estrada said Manila was debt-free; two months later, however, the Commission on Audit said Manila was ₱4.4 billion in debt.

Estrada, who was seeking for re-election for his third and final term, lost to Isko Moreno in the 2019 local elections. Moreno has served as the vice mayor under both Lim and Estrada. Estrada's defeat was seen as the end of their reign as a political clan, whose other family members run for national and local positions. After assuming office, Moreno initiated a city-wide cleanup of illegal vendors, signed an executive order promoting open governance, and vowed to stop bribery and corruption in the city. Under his administration, several ordinances were signed, giving additional perks and privileges to Manila's elderly people, and monthly allowances for Grade 12 Manileño students in all public schools in the city, including students of Universidad de Manila and the University of the City of Manila.

In 2022, Time Out ranked Manila in 34th position in its list of the 53 best cities in the world, citing it as "an underrated hub for art and culture, with unique customs and cuisine to boot". Manila was also voted the third-most-resilient and least-rude city for the year's index. In 2023, the search site Crossword Solm utilizing internet geotagging, showed that Manila is the world's most loving capital city.

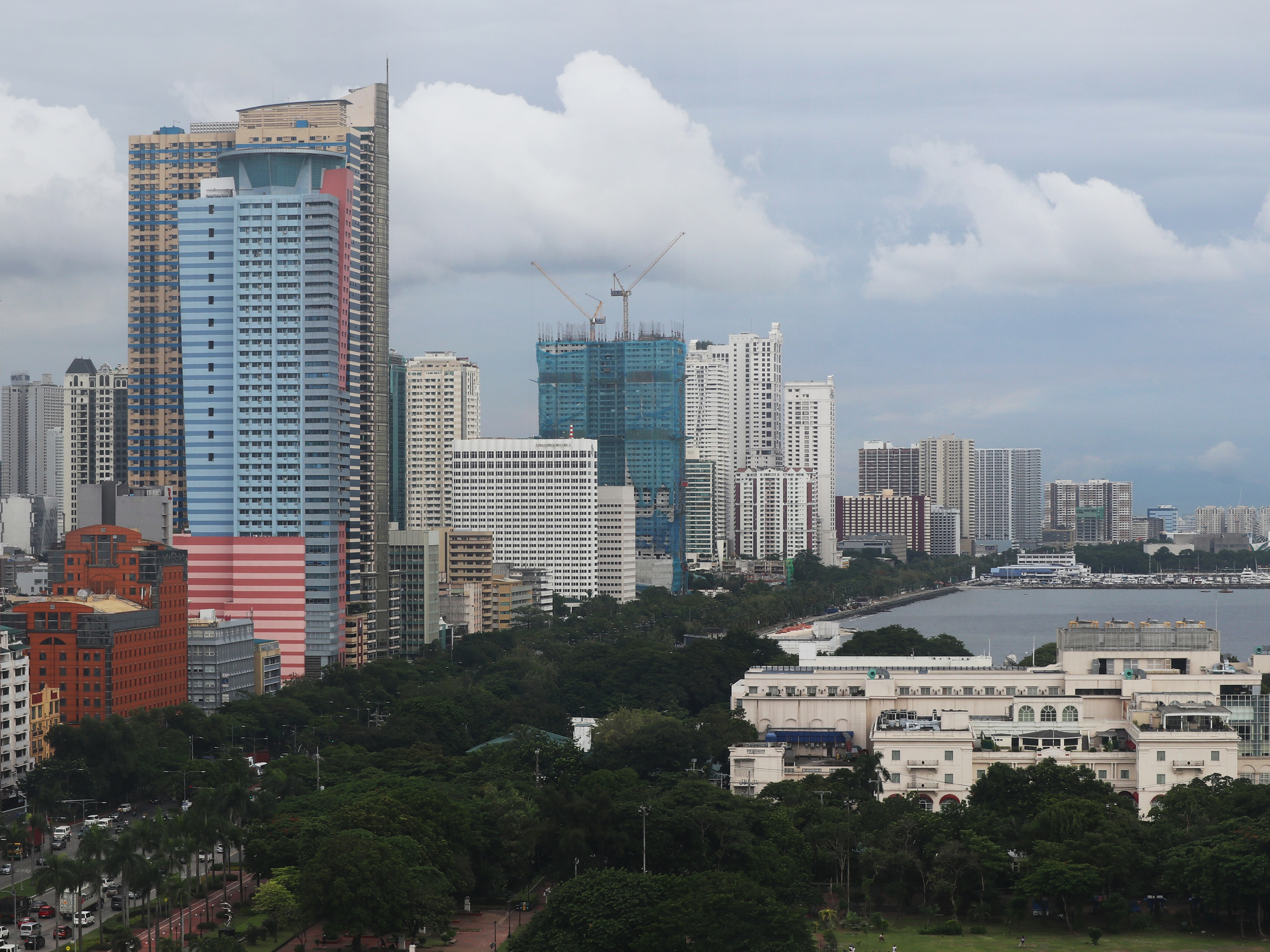
View of Manila along Roxas Boulevard in 2023

In August 2023, President Bongbong Marcos suspended all reclamation projects in Manila Bay, including those in the City of Manila. However, the city has no objections and is willing to pursue the suspended reclamation projects.

In 2024, Manila, as the nation's seat of government, witnessed the launch of the Fourth Philippine Human Rights Plan, aimed at advancing social justice, inclusivity, and human rights protection in line with international standards.

== Geography ==
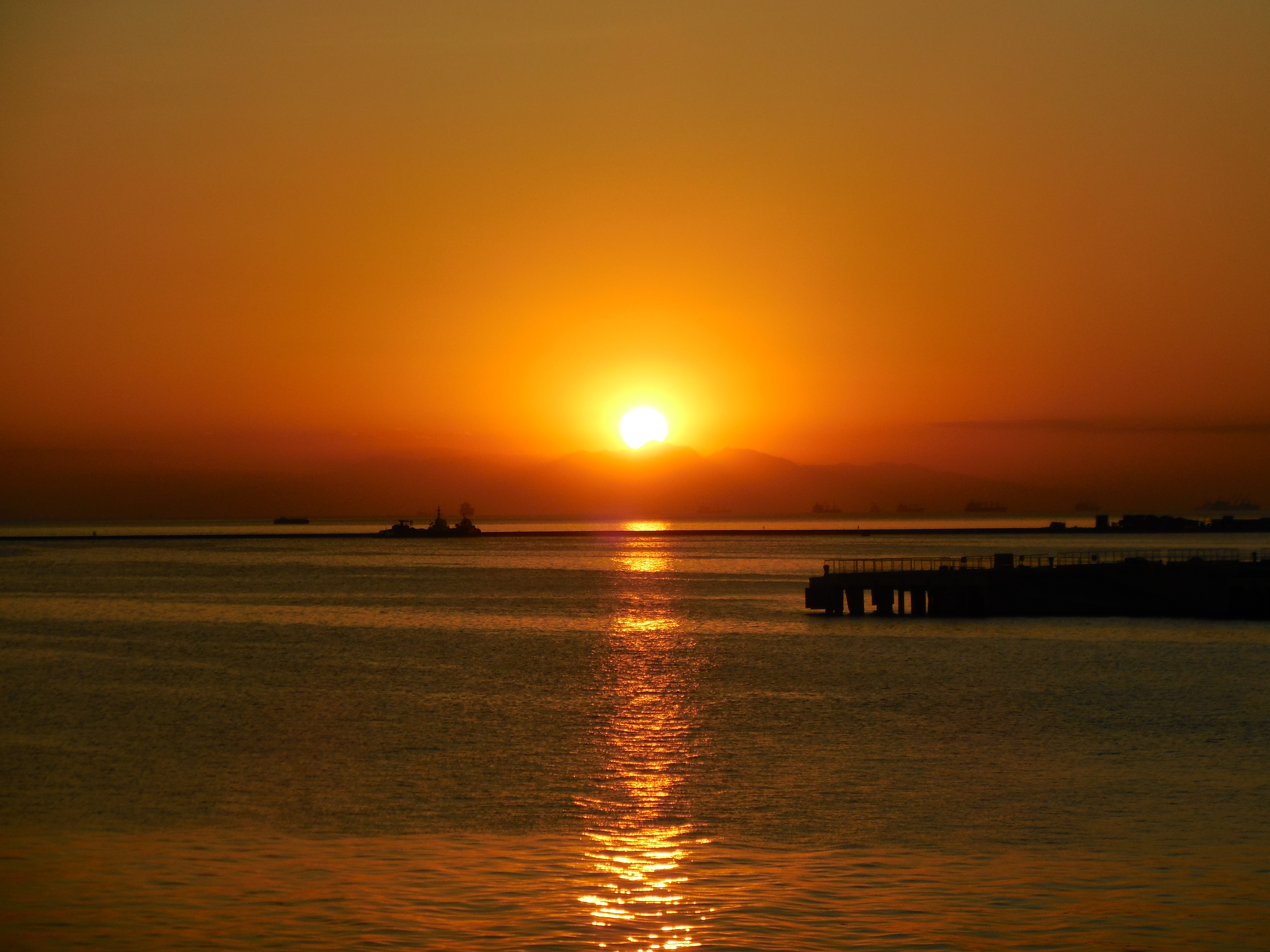
Manila Bay sunset

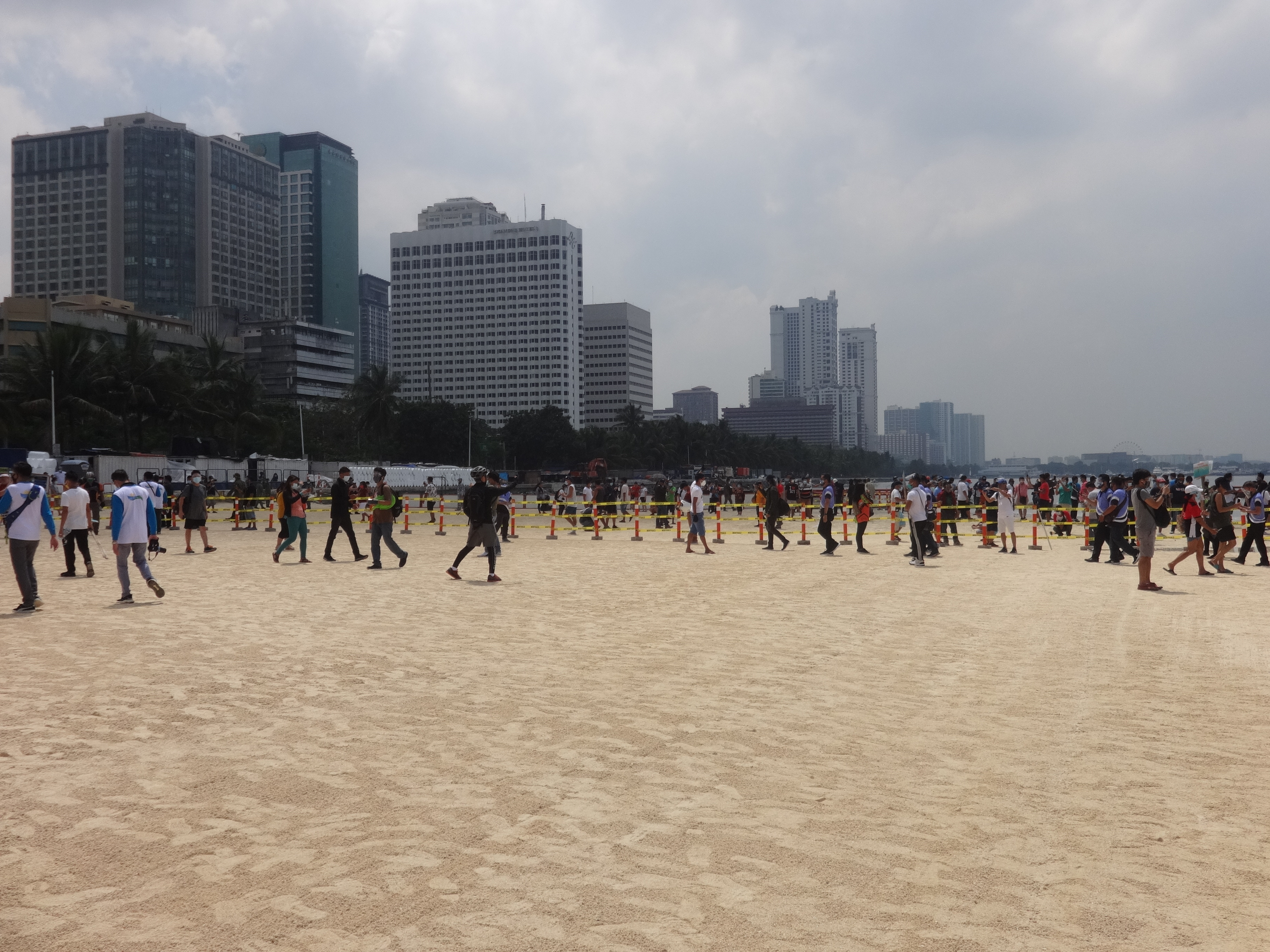
Manila Dolomite Beach during the International Coastal Cleanup Day in September 2020

A map showing the territorial extent and assets or properties of Manila, including its territorial exclave Manila South Cemetery, and Manila Boystown Complex, which is a property in Marikina owned by the Manila city government.

The City of Manila is situated on the eastern shore of Manila Bay, on the western coast of Luzon, 1,300 km (810 mi) from mainland Asia. The protected harbor on which Manila lies is regarded as the finest in Asia. The Pasig River flows through the middle of city, dividing it into north and south. The overall grade of the city's central, built-up areas is relatively consistent with the natural flatness of the natural geography, generally exhibiting only slight differentiation.

Almost all of Manila sits on top prehistoric alluvial deposits built by the waters of the Pasig River and on land reclaimed from Manila Bay. Manila's land has been substantially altered by human intervention; there has been considerable land reclamation along the waterfronts since the early-to-mid twentieth century. Some of the city's natural variations in topography have been leveled. As of 2013, Manila had a total area of 42.88 square kilometers (16.56 sq mi).

In 2017, the City Government approved five reclamation projects; the New Manila Bay–City of Pearl (New Manila Bay International Community) (407.43 hectares (1,006.8 acres)), Solar City (148 hectares (370 acres)), Manila Harbour Center expansion (50 hectares (120 acres)), Manila Waterfront City (318 hectares (790 acres)), and Horizon Manila (419 hectares (1,040 acres)). Of the five planned projects, only Horizon Manila was approved by the Philippine Reclamation Authority in December 2019 and was scheduled for construction in 2021.

Another reclamation project is possible and when built, it will include in-city housing relocation projects. Environmental activists and the Catholic Church have criticized the land reclamation projects, saying they are not sustainable and would put communities at risk of flooding. In line of the upcoming reclamation projects, the Philippines and the Netherlands agreed to a cooperation on the ₱250 million Manila Bay Sustainable Development Master Plan to oversee future decisions on projects on Manila Bay.

=== Barangays and districts ===
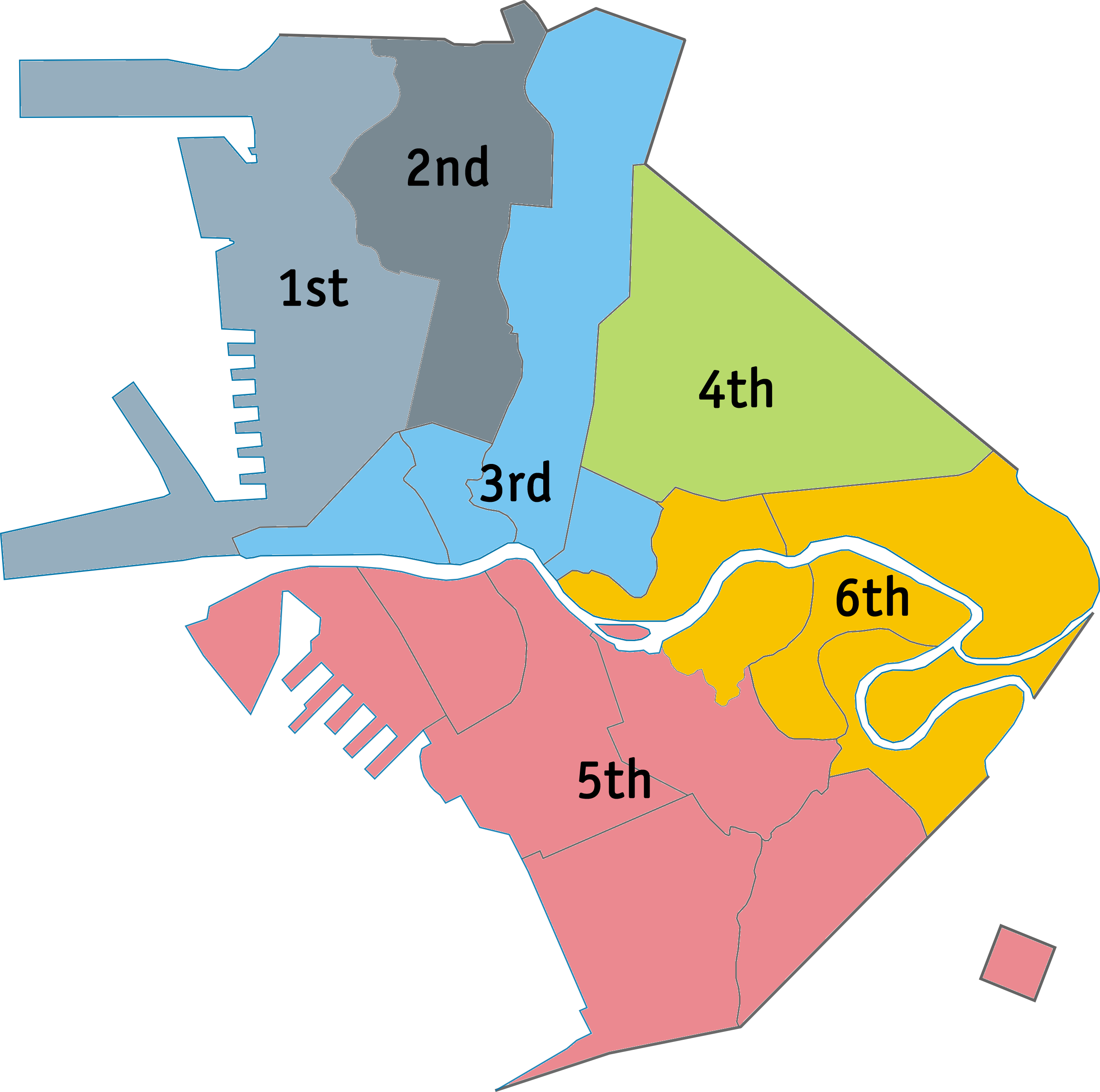
Manila is divided into six congressional districts.

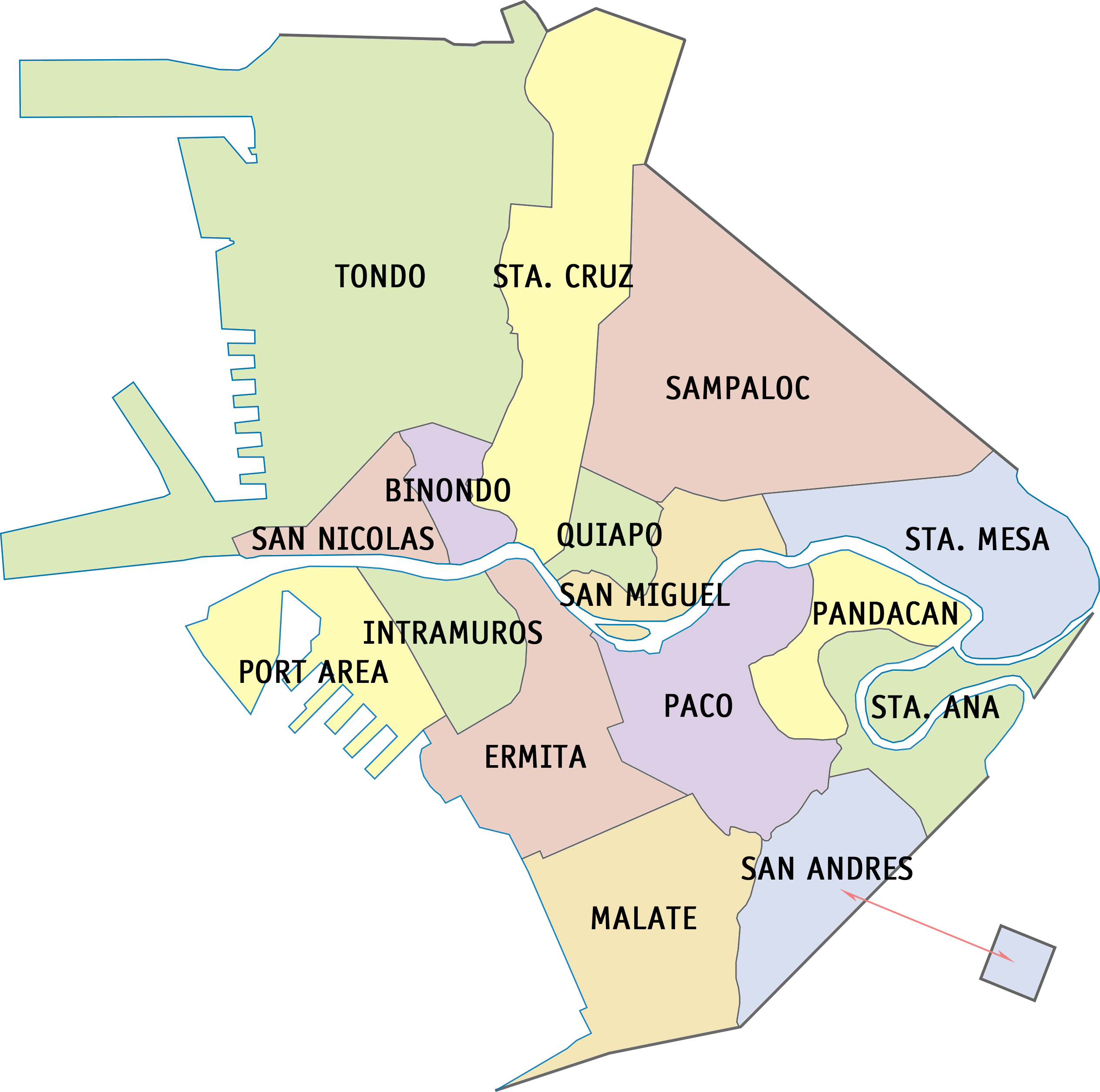
A district map of Manila showing its sixteen districts

Manila is made up of 897 barangays, which are grouped into 100 zones for statistical convenience. Manila has the most barangays of any metropolis in the Philippines. Due to a failure to hold a plebiscite, attempts at reducing its number have not succeeded despite local legislation—Ordinance 7907, passed on April 23, 1996—reducing the number from 896 to 150 by merging existing barangays.

- District I (2020 population: 441,282) covers the western part of Tondo and is made up of 136 barangays. It is the most-densely populated congressional district and is also known as Tondo I. The district includes one of the biggest urban-poor communities; Smokey Mountain on Balut Island was once known as the country's largest landfill where thousands of impoverished people lived in slums. After the closure of the landfill in 1995, mid-rise housing was built on the site. This district also contains the Manila North Harbor Center, Manila North Harbor, and Manila International Container Terminal of the Port of Manila. The 1st District also covers Manila's borders with Navotas and a part of the southern enclave of Caloocan.
- District II (2020 population: 212,938) covers the eastern part of Tondo and contains 122 barangays. It is also referred to as Tondo II. It includes Gagalangin, a prominent place in Tondo, and Divisoria, a popular shopping area and the site of the Main Terminal Station of the Philippine National Railways. The 2nd District also covers the rest of Manila's border with Caloocan.
- District III (2020 population: 220,029) covers Binondo, Quiapo, San Nicolas and Santa Cruz. It contains 123 barangays and includes "Downtown Manila", the historic business district of the city, and the oldest Chinatown in the world. The 3rd District also covers a part of Manila's border with Quezon City.
- District IV (2020 population: 277,013) covers Sampaloc and some parts of Santa Mesa. It contains 192 barangays and has numerous colleges and universities, which are located along the city's "University Belt", a de facto sub-district. Included here is the University of Santo Tomas, the oldest-existing university in Asia, which was established in 1611. The institution was home to at least 30 Catholic saints. The 4th District also covers portions of Manila's borders with Quezon City and San Juan.
- District V (2020 population: 395,065) covers Ermita, Malate, Port Area, Intramuros, San Andres Bukid, and a portion of Paco. It is made up of 184 barangays and includes Manila City Hall, Rizal Park, the historic Walled City, along with Manila Cathedral and San Agustin Church, a UNESCO World Heritage Site. The 5th District also covers portions of Manila's borders with Makati and Pasay. This district also includes the Manila South Cemetery, an exclave surrounded by Makati City.
- District VI (2020 population: 300,186) covers Pandacan, San Miguel, Santa Ana, Santa Mesa, and the rest of Paco. It contains 139 barangays and includes Malacañang Palace, the residence and workplace of the President of the Philippines. Santa Ana district is known for its 18th century Santa Ana Church and historic ancestral houses. The 6th District also covers the rest of Manila's borders with Quezon City, San Juan, Makati and Pasay.

| District name | Legislative District number | Area | | Population (2020) | Density | | Barangays |
| | | km^{2} | sq mi | | /km^{2} | /sq mi | |
|---|---|---|---|---|---|---|---|
| Binondo | 3 | 0.6611 | 0.2553 | 20,491 | 31,000 | 80,000 | 10 |
| Ermita | 5 | 1.5891 | 0.6136 | 19,189 | 12,000 | 31,000 | 13 |
| Intramuros | 5 | 0.6726 | 0.2597 | 6,103 | 9,100 | 24,000 | 5 |
| Malate | 5 | 2.5958 | 1.0022 | 99,257 | 38,000 | 98,000 | 57 |
| Paco | 5 & 6 | 2.7869 | 1.0760 | 79,839 | 29,000 | 75,000 | 43 |
| Pandacan | 6 | 1.66 | 0.64 | 84,769 | 51,000 | 130,000 | 38 |
| Port Area | 5 | 3.1528 | 1.2173 | 72,605 | 23,000 | 60,000 | 5 |
| Quiapo | 3 | 0.8469 | 0.3270 | 29,846 | 35,000 | 91,000 | 16 |
| Sampaloc | 4 | 5.1371 | 1.9834 | 388,305 | 76,000 | 200,000 | 192 |
| San Andres | 5 | 1.6802 | 0.6487 | 133,727 | 80,000 | 210,000 | 65 |
| San Miguel | 6 | 0.9137 | 0.3528 | 18,599 | 20,000 | 52,000 | 12 |
| San Nicolas | 3 | 1.6385 | 0.6326 | 42,957 | 26,000 | 67,000 | 15 |
| Santa Ana | 6 | 1.6942 | 0.6541 | 203,598 | 120,000 | 310,000 | 34 |
| Santa Cruz | 3 | 3.0901 | 1.1931 | 126,735 | 41,000 | 110,000 | 82 |
| Santa Mesa | 6 | 2.6101 | 1.0078 | 111,292 | 43,000 | 110,000 | 51 |
| Tondo | 1 & 2 | 8.6513 | 3.3403 | 654,220 | 76,000 | 200,000 | 259 |

=== Climate ===
Manila's annual temperature and rainfall

Under the Köppen climate classification system, Manila has a tropical monsoon climate (Köppen Am), closely bordering on a tropical savanna climate (Köppen Aw). Together with the rest of the Philippines, Manila lies entirely within the tropics. Its proximity to the equator means temperatures are high year-round especially during the daytime, rarely going below 19 °C (66.2 °F) or above 38 °C (100.4 °F). Temperature extremes have ranged from 14.5 °C (58.1 °F) on January 11, 1914, to 38.6 °C (101.5 °F) on May 7, 1915.

Humidity levels are usually very high all year round, making the air feel hotter than its actual temperature. Manila has a distinct dry season lasting from late December to early April. A relatively lengthy wet season that covers the remaining period, with slightly cooler daytime temperatures and slightly warmer nighttime temperatures. In the wet season, rain rarely falls all day, but rainfall is very heavy for short periods. Typhoons usually occur from June to September.

Climate data for Port Area, Manila (1991–2020 normals, extremes 1885–2024)
| Month | Jan | Feb | Mar | Apr | May | Jun | Jul | Aug | Sep | Oct | Nov | Dec | Year |
|---|---|---|---|---|---|---|---|---|---|---|---|---|---|
| Record high °C (°F) | 36.5 (97.7) | 35.6 (96.1) | 36.8 (98.2) | 38.8 (101.8) | 38.6 (101.5) | 37.6 (99.7) | 37.0 (98.6) | 36.2 (97.2) | 35.3 (95.5) | 35.8 (96.4) | 35.6 (96.1) | 34.6 (94.3) | 38.8 (101.8) |
| Mean daily maximum °C (°F) | 29.9 (85.8) | 30.7 (87.3) | 32.1 (89.8) | 33.8 (92.8) | 33.6 (92.5) | 32.8 (91.0) | 31.5 (88.7) | 31.0 (87.8) | 31.2 (88.2) | 31.4 (88.5) | 31.3 (88.3) | 30.3 (86.5) | 31.6 (88.9) |
| Daily mean °C (°F) | 26.9 (80.4) | 27.5 (81.5) | 28.7 (83.7) | 30.3 (86.5) | 30.3 (86.5) | 29.7 (85.5) | 28.7 (83.7) | 28.5 (83.3) | 28.4 (83.1) | 28.6 (83.5) | 28.3 (82.9) | 27.4 (81.3) | 28.6 (83.5) |
| Mean daily minimum °C (°F) | 23.9 (75.0) | 24.3 (75.7) | 25.3 (77.5) | 26.7 (80.1) | 27.0 (80.6) | 26.5 (79.7) | 25.9 (78.6) | 25.9 (78.6) | 25.7 (78.3) | 25.7 (78.3) | 25.3 (77.5) | 24.6 (76.3) | 25.6 (78.1) |
| Record low °C (°F) | 14.5 (58.1) | 15.6 (60.1) | 16.2 (61.2) | 17.2 (63.0) | 20.0 (68.0) | 20.1 (68.2) | 19.4 (66.9) | 18.0 (64.4) | 20.2 (68.4) | 19.5 (67.1) | 16.8 (62.2) | 15.7 (60.3) | 14.5 (58.1) |
| Average rainfall mm (inches) | 19.4 (0.76) | 21.9 (0.86) | 21.8 (0.86) | 23.4 (0.92) | 159.1 (6.26) | 253.3 (9.97) | 432.3 (17.02) | 476.1 (18.74) | 396.4 (15.61) | 220.6 (8.69) | 119.9 (4.72) | 98.5 (3.88) | 2,242.7 (88.30) |
| Average rainy days (≥ 1.0 mm) | 4 | 3 | 3 | 3 | 9 | 14 | 19 | 19 | 18 | 14 | 10 | 8 | 124 |
| Average relative humidity (%) | 72 | 70 | 67 | 66 | 72 | 76 | 80 | 82 | 81 | 77 | 75 | 75 | 74 |
| Mean monthly sunshine hours | 177 | 198 | 226 | 258 | 223 | 162 | 133 | 133 | 132 | 158 | 153 | 152 | 2,105 |
Source 1: PAGASA
Source 2: Danish Meteorological Institute (sun, 1931–1960)

=== Natural hazards ===
Swiss Re ranked Manila as the second-riskiest capital city to live in, citing its exposure to natural hazards such as earthquakes, tsunamis, typhoons, floods, and landslides. The seismically active Marikina Valley Fault System poses a threat of a large-scale earthquake with an estimated magnitude of between 6 and 7, and as high as 7.6 to Metro Manila and nearby provinces. Manila has experienced several deadly earthquakes, notably those of 1645 and 1677, which destroyed the stone-and-brick medieval city. Architects during the Spanish colonial period used the Earthquake Baroque style to adapt to the region's frequent earthquakes. The Taal Volcano located to the south of Manila also poses a threat when it erupts.

Manila experiences between five and seven typhoons each year. In 2009, Typhoon Ketsana (Ondoy) struck the Philippines, leading to one of the worst floods in Metro Manila and several provinces in Luzon with an estimated damages worth ₱11 billion (US$237 million), and caused 448 deaths in Metro Manila alone. Following the aftermath of Typhoon Ketsana, the city began to dredge its rivers and improve its drainage network.

=== Parks and green spaces ===
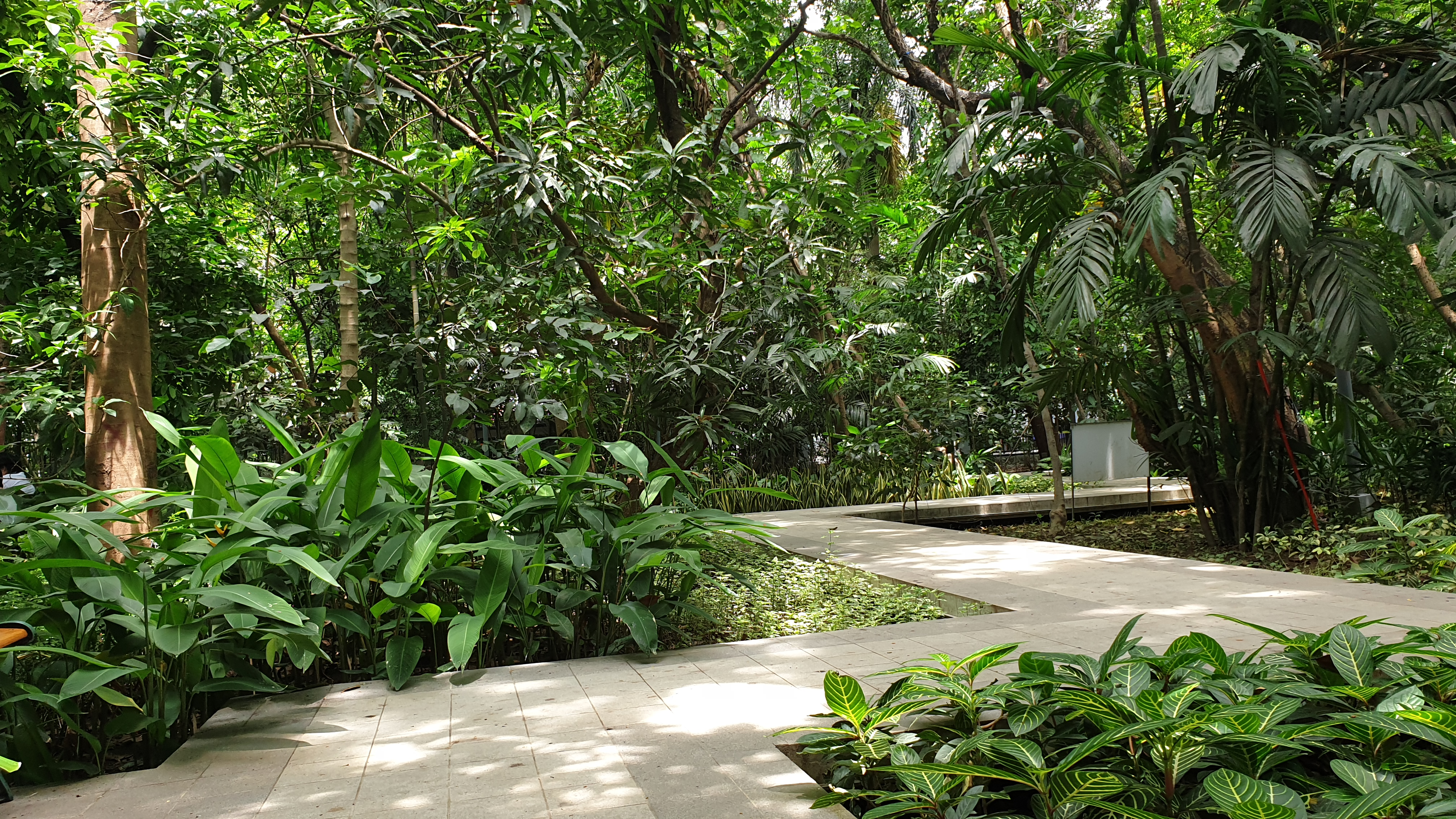
The Arroceros Forest Park is considered as the "last lung of Manila".

Metro Manila is situated in a variety of ecosystems including upland forests, mangrove forests, mudflats, sandy beaches, sea grass meadows and coral reefs. Metro Manila is home to urban parks, nature parks, plazas, nature reserves, and an arboretum. However, according to the Asian Green City Index, in 2007 Manila contained only an average of 4.5 square meters (48 sq ft) of green space per person, well below the index average of 39 square meters (420 sq ft) and below the World Health Organization (WHO) recommended minimum of 9 square meters (97 sq ft) per person.

The Arroceros Forest Park is a 2.2-hectare (5.4-acre) nature park situated in the heart of downtown Manila along the south bank of the Pasig River. Considered as the "last lung of Manila", the park was professionally planned in 1993 with its secondary growth forest of 61 different native tree varieties and 8,000 ornamental plants providing a habitat for about 10 different bird species.

=== Pollution ===
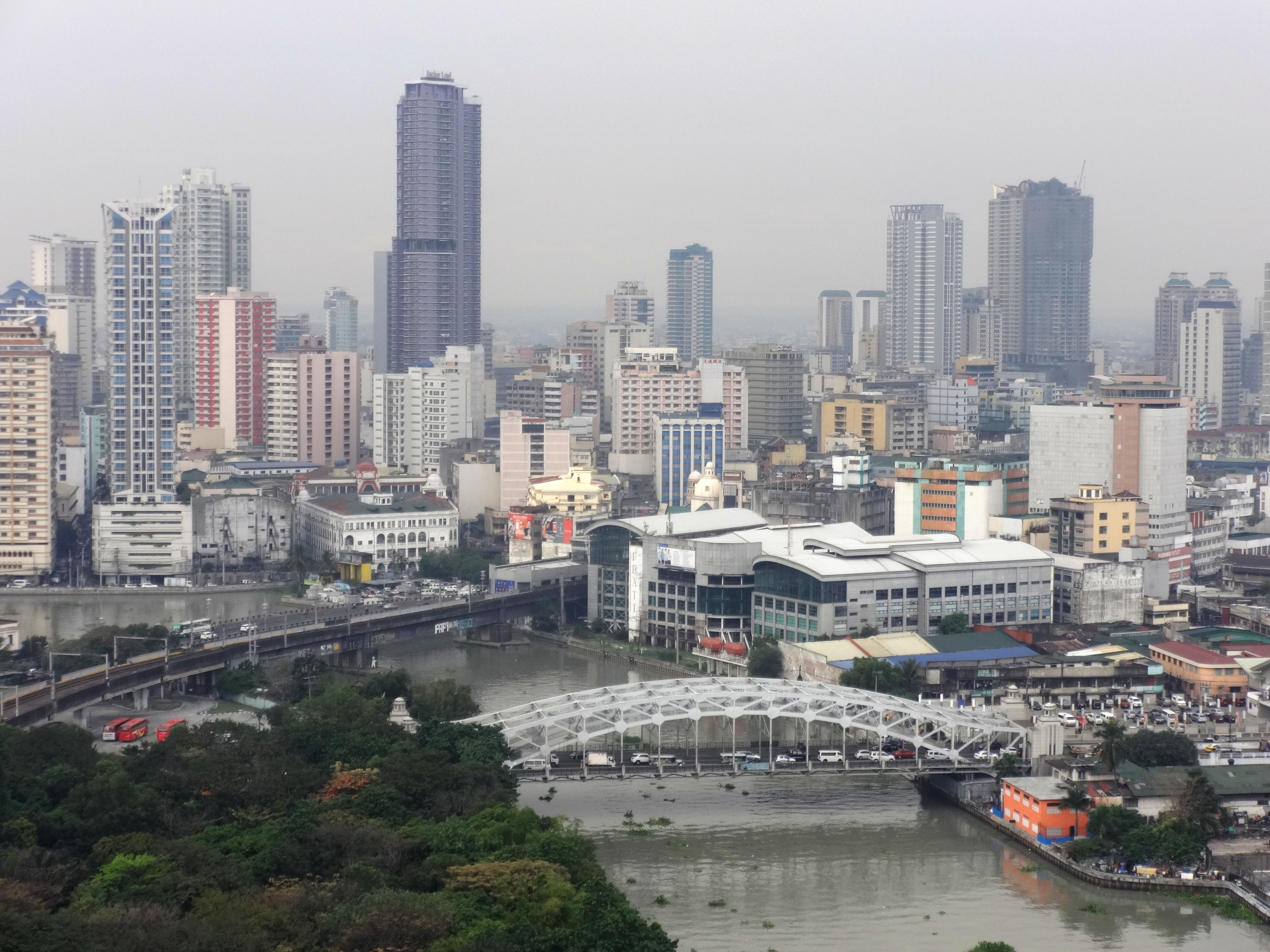
Smog in the Quiapo-Binondo area

Air pollution in Manila is due to industrial waste and automobiles. Swiss firm IQAir reported in December 2020 Manila experienced an average PM2.5 concentration of 6.1×10^{−6} g/m^{3} (1.03×10^{−8} lb/cu yd), which is classed as "Good" according to recommendations made by the World Health Organization.

According to a report in 2003, the Pasig River is one of the most-polluted rivers in the world in which 150 metric tons (150 long tons; 170 short tons) of domestic waste and 75 metric tons (74 long tons; 83 short tons) of industrial waste are dumped daily. The city is the second-biggest waste producing metropolis in the country with 1,151.79 tons (7,500.07 cubic meters (264,862 ft^{3})) per day, after Quezon City, which produces 1,386.84 tons (12,730.59 cubic meters (449,577 ft^{3})) per day. Both cities were cited as having poor management in garbage collection and disposal. A 2021 report by Oxford University's Our World in Data estimated eighty one percent of global ocean plastic comes from rivers in Asia and the Philippines itself contributes one third of that number, and the Pasig River is one of the main contributors.

Rehabilitation efforts have resulted in the creation of parks along the riverside and stricter pollution controls. In 2019, the Department of Environment and Natural Resources launched a rehabilitation program for Manila Bay that will be administered by different government agencies.

== Cityscape ==
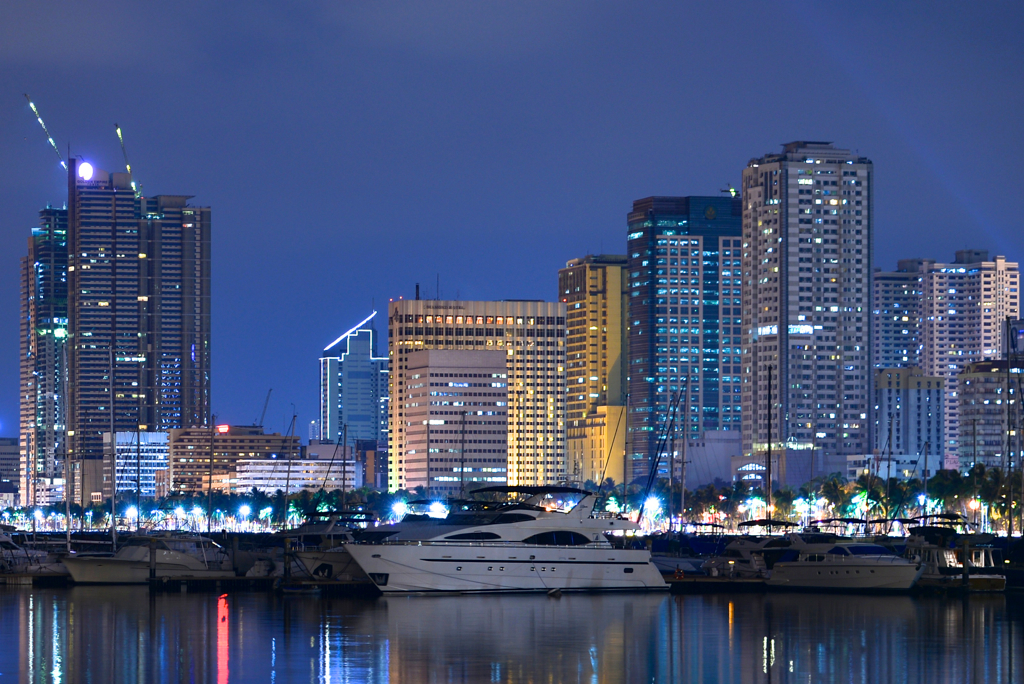
The Roxas Boulevard skyline at night along Manila Bay.

Manila is a planned city. In 1905, American architect and urban planner Daniel Burnham was commissioned to design the new capital. His design for the city was based on the City Beautiful movement, which favored broad streets and avenues radiating out from rectangles. Manila is made up of fourteen city districts, according to Republic Act No. 409—the Revised Charter of the City of Manila—the basis of which officially sets the present-day boundary of the city. The districts Santa Mesa, which was partitioned from Sampaloc, and San Andres, which was partitioned off from Santa Ana, were later created.

Manila's mix of architectural styles reflects its, and the Philippines', turbulent history. During World War II, Manila was razed to the ground by Japanese forces and the shelling of American forces. After the war ended, rebuilding began and most of the historical buildings were reconstructed. Many of the historic churches and buildings in Intramuros, Manila's historic core, however, had been damaged beyond repair. Manila's current urban landscape is one of modern and contemporary architecture. Manila's historic sites under the entry of The Walled City and Historic Monuments of Manila is currently being proposed to the tentative list for future UNESCO World Heritage Site inscription.

=== Architecture ===
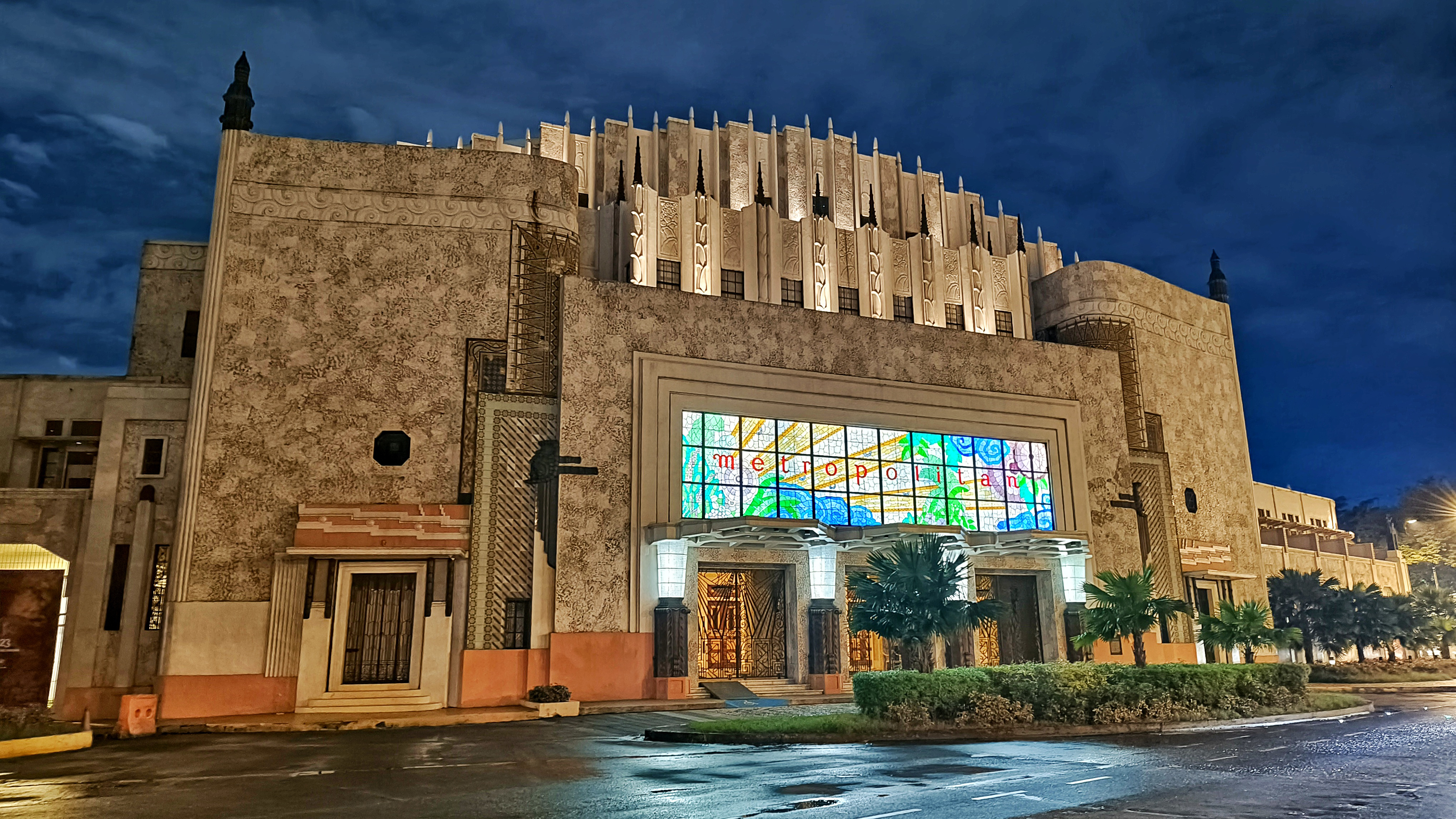
The façade of the Manila Metropolitan Theater, designed by Filipino architect Juan M. Arellano

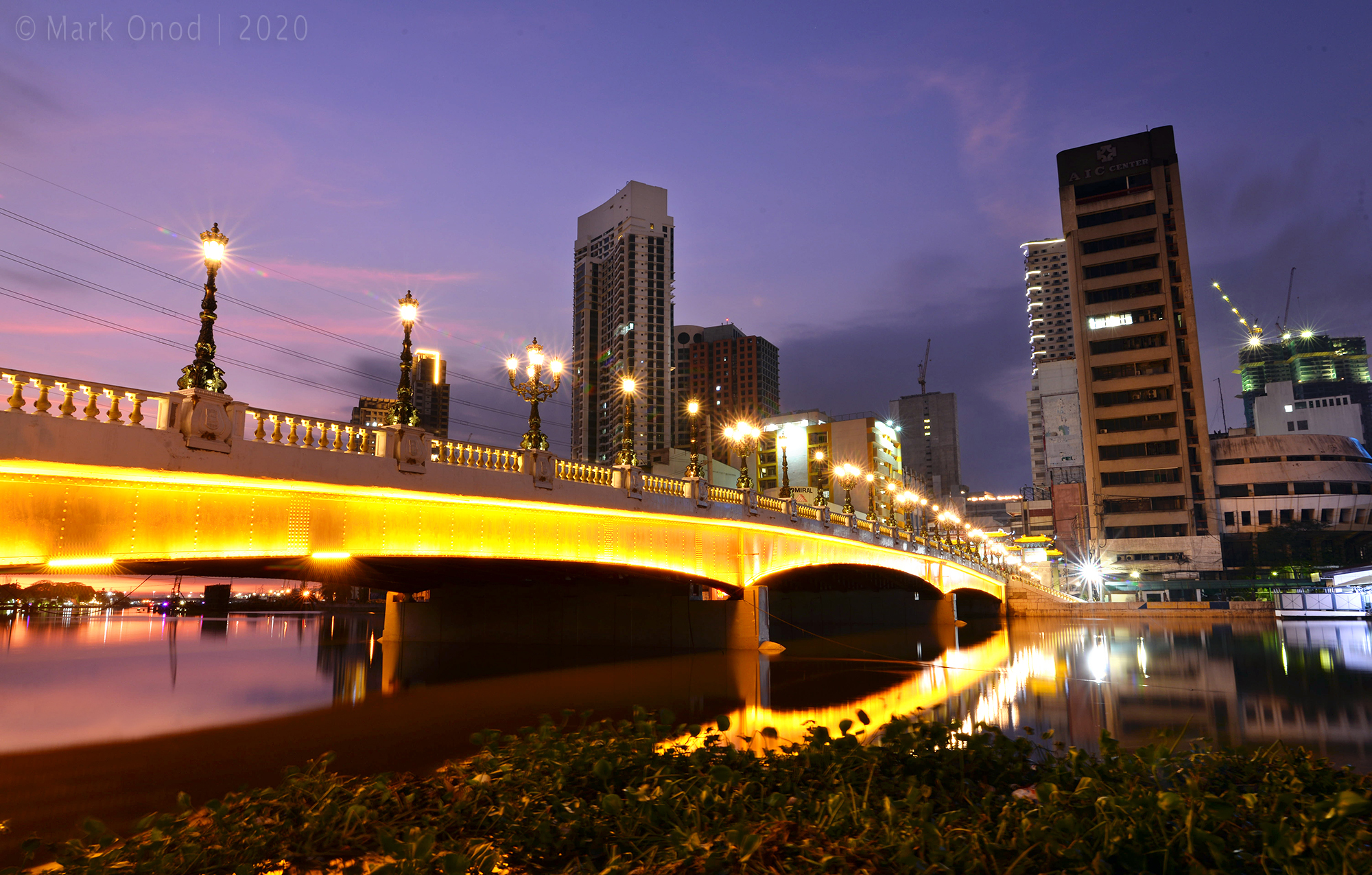
Jones Bridge was redeveloped in 2019 to "restore" it to its near-original design using Beaux-Arts architecture.

Manila is known for its eclectic mix of architecture that includes a wide range of styles spanning the city's historical and cultural periods. Its architectural styles reflect American, Spanish, Chinese, and Malay influences. Prominent Filipino architects including Antonio Toledo, Felipe Roxas, Juan M. Arellano and Tomás Mapúa have designed significant buildings in Manila such as churches, government offices, theaters, mansions, schools, and universities.

Manila is known for its Art Deco theaters, some of which were designed by Juan Nakpil and Pablo Antonio. The historic Escolta Street in Binondo has many buildings of Neoclassical and Beaux-Arts architectural styles, many of which were designed by prominent Filipino architects during the American colonial period between the 1920s and the late 1930s. Many architects, artists, historians, and heritage advocacy groups are campaigning for the restoration of Escolta Street, which was once the premier street of the Philippines.

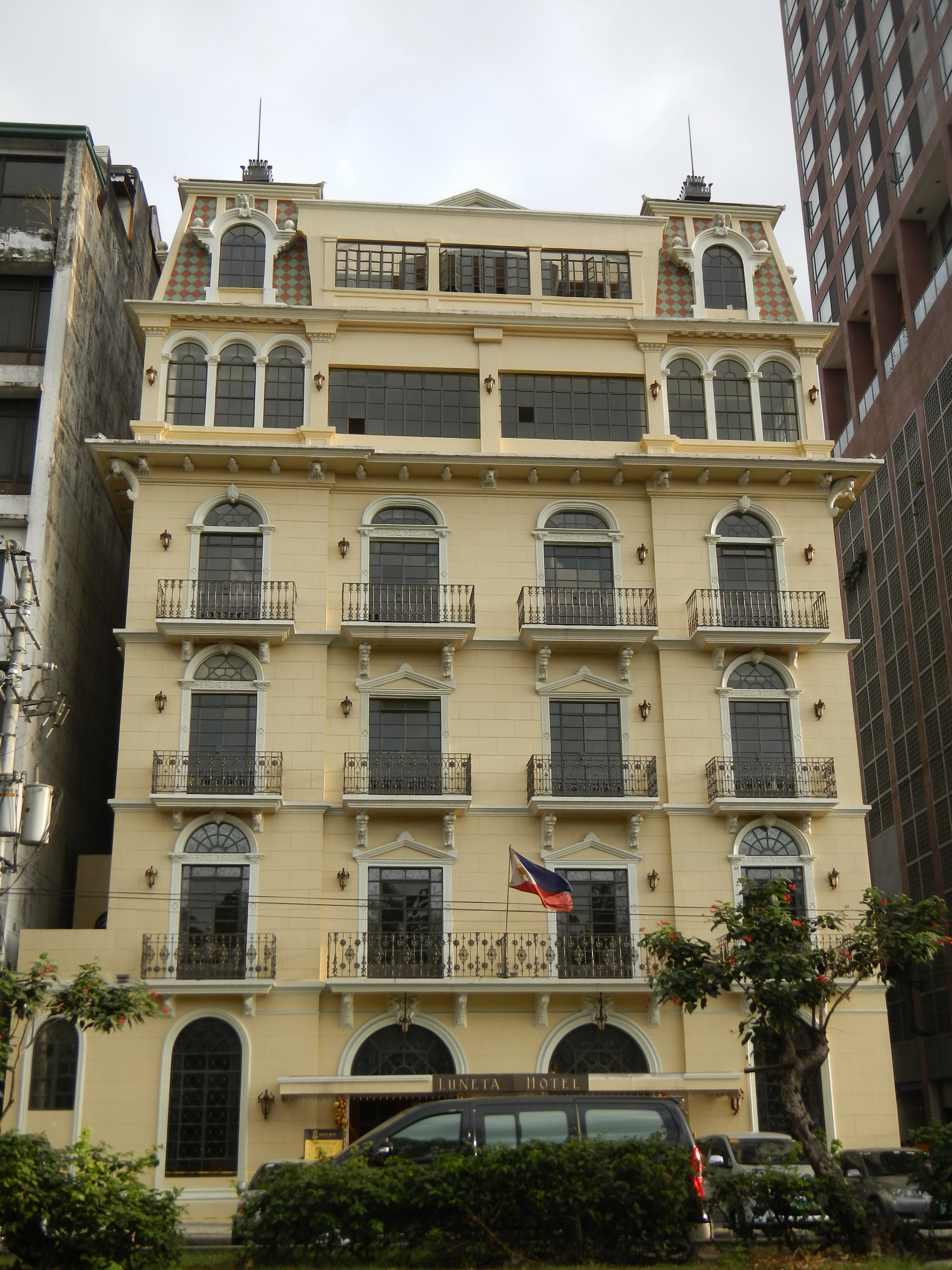
The Luneta Hotel, an example of French Renaissance architecture with Filipino stylized beaux art

Almost all of Manila's pre-war and Spanish colonial architecture was destroyed during the 1945 Battle of Manila by intensive bombardment by the United States Air Force. Reconstruction took place afterward, replacing the destroyed historic Spanish-era buildings with modern ones, erasing much of the city's character. Some of the destroyed buildings, such as the Old Legislative Building (now the National Museum of Fine Arts), Ayuntamiento de Manila (now the Bureau of the Treasury), and the under-construction San Ignacio Church and Convent (as the Museo de Intramuros), have been reconstructed. There are plans to refurbish and restore several neglected historic buildings and places such as Plaza Del Carmen, San Sebastian Church, and the NCCA Metropolitan Theater. Spanish-era shops and houses in the districts of Binondo, Quiapo, and San Nicolas are also planned to be restored as a part of a movement to restore the city to its pre-war state.

Because Manila is prone to earthquakes, Spanish colonial architects invented a style called Earthquake Baroque, which churches and government buildings during the Spanish colonial period adopted. As a result, succeeding earthquakes of the 18th and 19th centuries barely affected Manila, although they periodically leveled the surrounding area. Modern buildings in and around Manila are designed or have been retrofitted to withstand an 8.2 magnitude quake in accordance with the country's building code.

== Demographics ==
Population Census of Manila
| Year | Pop. | ±% p.a. |
|---|---|---|
| 1903 | 219,928 | — |
| 1918 | 285,306 | +1.75% |
| 1939 | 623,492 | +3.79% |
| 1948 | 983,906 | +5.20% |
| 1960 | 1,138,611 | +1.22% |
| 1970 | 1,330,788 | +1.57% |
| 1975 | 1,479,116 | +2.14% |
| 1980 | 1,630,485 | +1.97% |
| 1990 | 1,601,234 | −0.18% |
| 1995 | 1,654,761 | +0.62% |
| 2000 | 1,581,082 | −0.97% |
| 2007 | 1,660,714 | +0.68% |
| 2010 | 1,652,171 | −0.19% |
| 2015 | 1,780,148 | +1.43% |
| 2020 | 1,846,513 | +0.77% |
| 2024 | 1,902,590 | +0.72% |
Source: Philippine Statistics Authority

Manila population pyramid in 2021

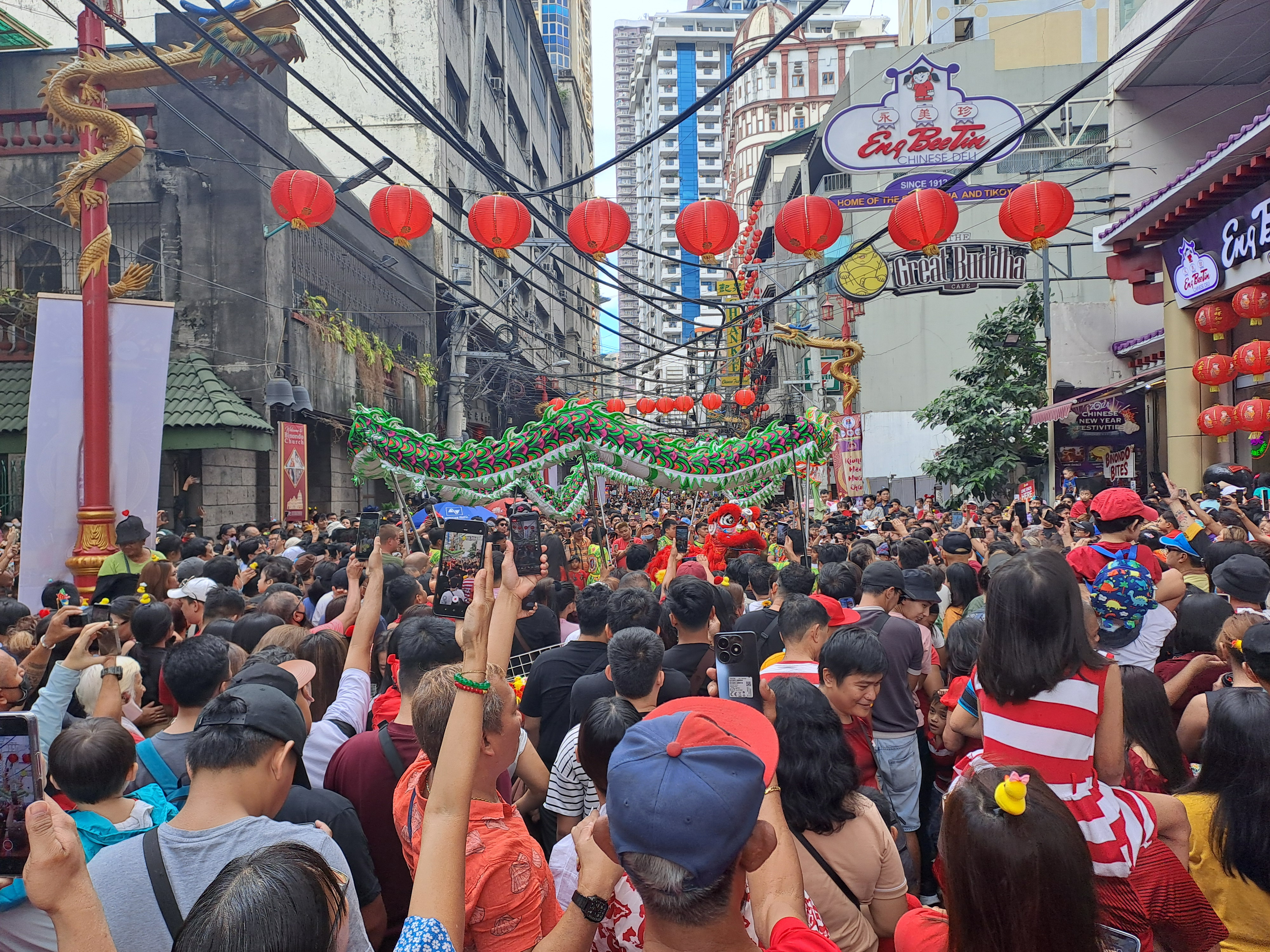
People flocking to the Binondo Chinatown during Chinese New Year

According to the 2024 Philippine census, Manila has a population of 1,902,590 people, making it the second-most-populous city in the Philippines. Manila is the most-densely populated city in the world, with 41,515 inhabitants per km^{2} in 2015. District 6 is listed as the densest with 68,266 inhabitants per km^{2}, followed by District 1 with 64,936 and District 2 with 64,710. District 5 is the least-densely populated area with 19,235.

Manila has been presumed to be the Philippines' largest city since the establishment of a permanent Spanish settlement, and eventually became the political, commercial, and ecclesiastical capital of the country. Since colonial times, Manila has been the destination of peoples whose origins are as wide-ranging as India. Practicing forensic anthropology, while exhuming cranial bones in several Philippine cemeteries, researcher Matthew C. Go estimated that 7% of the mean amount, among the samples exhumed, have attribution to European descent. Research work published in the Journal of Forensic Anthropology, collating contemporary Anthropological data show that the percentage of Filipino bodies who were sampled from the University of the Philippines, that is phenotypically classified as Asian (East, South and Southeast Asian) is 72.7%, Hispanic (Spanish-Amerindian Mestizo, Latin American, and/or Spanish-Malay Mestizo) is at 12.7%, Indigenous American (Native American) at 7.3%, African at 4.5%, and European at 2.7%. However, this is only according to an interpretation of the data wherein the reference groups, which were cross checked to the Filipino samples; for the Hispanic category, were Mexican-Americans, and the reference groups for the: European, African, and Indigenous American, categories, were: White Americans, Black Americans, and Native Americans from the USA, while the Asian reference groups were sourced from Chinese, Japanese, and Vietnamese origins. In contrast, a different anthropology study using Morphoscopic ancestry estimates in Filipino crania using multivariate probit regression models by J. T. Hefner, while analyzing Historic and Modern samples of Philippine skeletons, paint a different picture, in that, when the reference group for "Asian" was Thailand (Southeast Asians) rather than Chinese, Japanese, and Vietnamese; the reference for "Africans" included West and East Africans, along with Black Americans; and the reference group for "Hispanic" was Colombians (South Americans) rather than Mexicans, the historical and modern sample results for Filipinos, yielded the following ratios: Asian at 48.6%, African at 32.9%, which is attributed to extensive admixture with Negritos since the initial peopling of the Filipino archipleago, and only a small portion classifying as either European at 12.9%, and finally for Hispanic at 5.7%.

Between the 1860s and 1890s, in urban areas of the Philippines – especially Manila – according to burial statistics, as much as 3.3% of the population were pure European Spaniards and pure Chinese composed 9.9% of the city's populace. The Spanish-Filipino and Chinese-Filipino Mestizo populations also fluctuated, with the mixed Spanish-Filipinos composing 19% of Manila's population. Eventually, these non-native categories diminished because they were assimilated into the majority Austronesian Filipino population. During the Philippine Revolution, the term "Filipino" included people of any race born in the Philippines. This explains the abrupt drop of the proportion of Chinese, Spanish, and Mestizo peoples across the country by the time of the first American census in 1903, as the foreign and mixed descended peoples identified solely as pure Filipinos. Manila's population dramatically increased since the 1903 census because people tended to move from rural areas to towns and cities. In the 1960 census, Manila became the first Philippine city to exceed one million people – more than five times of its 1903 population. The city continued to grow until the population stabilized at 1.6 million and experienced alternating increases and decreases starting in the 1990 census year. This phenomenon may be attributed to the higher growth experienced by suburbs and the already-very-high population density of the city. As such, Manila exhibited a decreasing percentage share of the metropolitan population from 63% in the 1950s to 27.5% in 1980, and 13.8% in 2015. The much-larger Quezon City marginally surpassed the population of Manila in 1990 and by the 2015 census it already had 1.1 million more people. Nationally, the population of Manila was expected to be overtaken by cities with larger territories such as Caloocan and Davao City by 2020.

=== Language ===
The vernacular language is Filipino, which is mostly based on the Tagalog language of the city and its surroundings, and this Manilan form of spoken Tagalog has become the lingua franca of the Philippines, having spread throughout the archipelago through mass media and entertainment. English is the language most widely used in education and business, and is in heavy everyday use throughout Metro Manila and the rest of the Philippines.

Philippine Hokkien, which is locally known as Lan-nang-oe, a variant of Southern Min, is mainly spoken by the city's Chinese-Filipino community. According to data provided by the Bureau of Immigration, 3.12 million Chinese citizens arrived in the Philippines from January 2016 to May 2018.

=== Crime ===
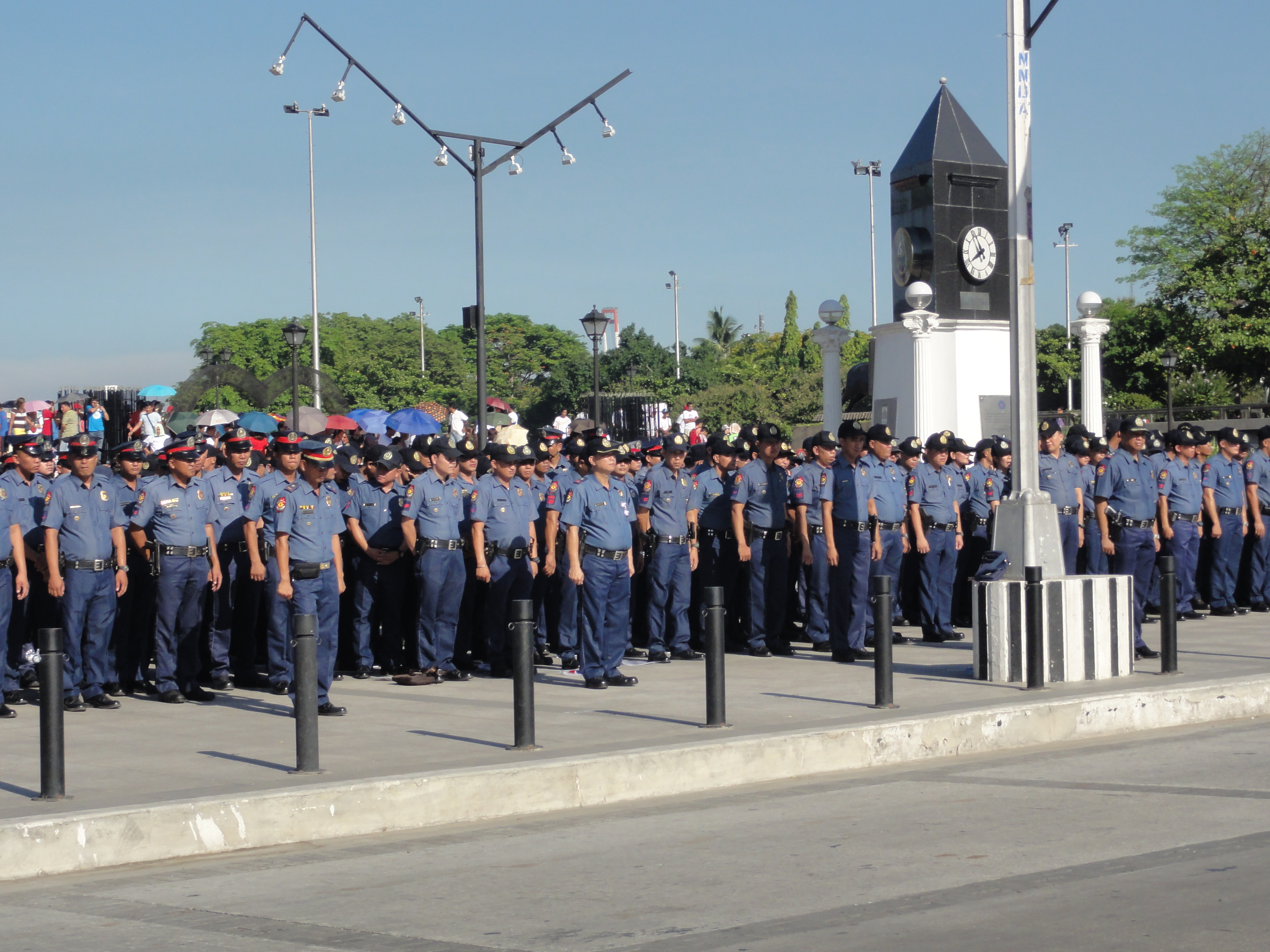
Manila Police District officers in Rizal Park.

Crime in Manila is concentrated in areas that are associated with poverty, drug abuse, and gangs. Crime in the city is also directly related to its changing demographics and unique criminal justice system. The illegal drug trade is a major problem of the city; in Metro Manila alone, 92% of the barangays were affected by illegal drugs in February 2015.

From 2010 to 2015, Manila had the second-highest index crime rates in the Philippines, with 54,689 cases or an average of about 9,100 cases per year. By October 2017, Manila Police District (MPD) reported a 38.7% decrease in index crimes from 5,474 cases in 2016 to 3,393 in 2017. MPD's crime-solution efficiency also improved; six-to-seven of every ten crimes were solved by the city police force. MPD was cited as the Best Police District in Metro Manila in 2017 for registering the highest crime-solution efficiency.

=== Religion ===
Religion in Manila (circa 2010)
1. Catholicism (93.5%)
2. Iglesia ni Cristo (1.90%)
3. Protestantism (1.80%)
4. Buddhism (1.10%)
5. Other (1.40%)

==== Christianity ====
As a result of Spanish cultural influence, Manila is a predominantly Christian city. As of 2010, 93.5% of the population were Roman Catholic, 1.9% were adherents of the Iglesia ni Cristo, 1.8% followed various Protestant, and 1.1% were Buddhists. Members of Islam and other religions make up the remaining 1.4% of the population.

Manila is the seat of prominent Catholic churches and institutions. There are 113 Catholic churches within the city limits; 63 of which are considered major shrines, basilicas, or cathedrals. Manila Cathedral, the country's oldest established church, is the seat of the Roman Catholic Archdiocese of Manila. There are another three basilicas in the city; Quiapo Church, Binondo Church, and the Minor Basilica of San Sebastián. San Agustín Church in Intramuros is a UNESCO World Heritage Site. Some companies in Manila have their own chapels or use their business facilities for daily Masses.

Several Mainline Protestant denominations are headquartered in the city. St. Stephen's Parish pro-cathedral in Santa Cruz district is the see of the Episcopal Church in the Philippines' Diocese of Central Philippines, while on Taft Avenue are the main cathedral and central offices of Iglesia Filipina Independiente (also called the Aglipayan Church), a nationalist church that is a product of the Philippine Revolution. The Church of Jesus Christ of Latter-day Saints (LDS Church) has a temple within Manila, one of two operating LDS temples in the Philippines.

The indigenous Iglesia ni Cristo has several locales (akin to parishes) in the city, including its first chapel, now a museum, in Punta, Santa Ana. Evangelical, Pentecostal and Seventh-day Adventist denominations also thrive. The headquarters of the Philippine Bible Society is in Manila. The main campus of the Cathedral of Praise is located on Taft Avenue. Jesus Is Lord Church Worldwide has several branches and campuses in Manila.

Religious groups such as Members Church of God International (MCGI), Iglesia ni Cristo, Jesus Is Lord Church Worldwide, and the El Shaddai movement celebrate their anniversaries at Quirino Grandstand, which is an open space in Rizal Park.

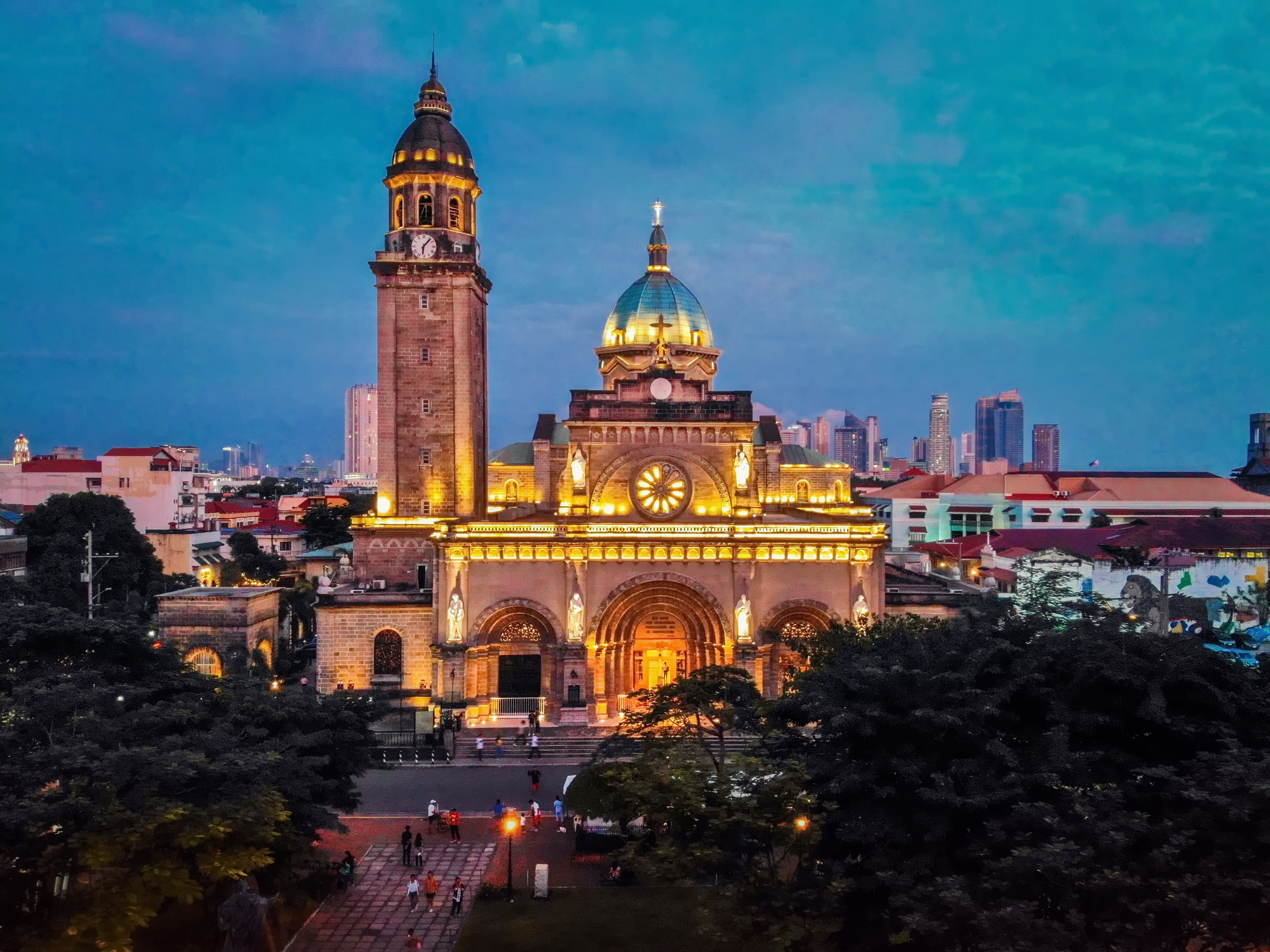
Manila Cathedral is the seat of Roman Catholic Archdiocese of Manila.

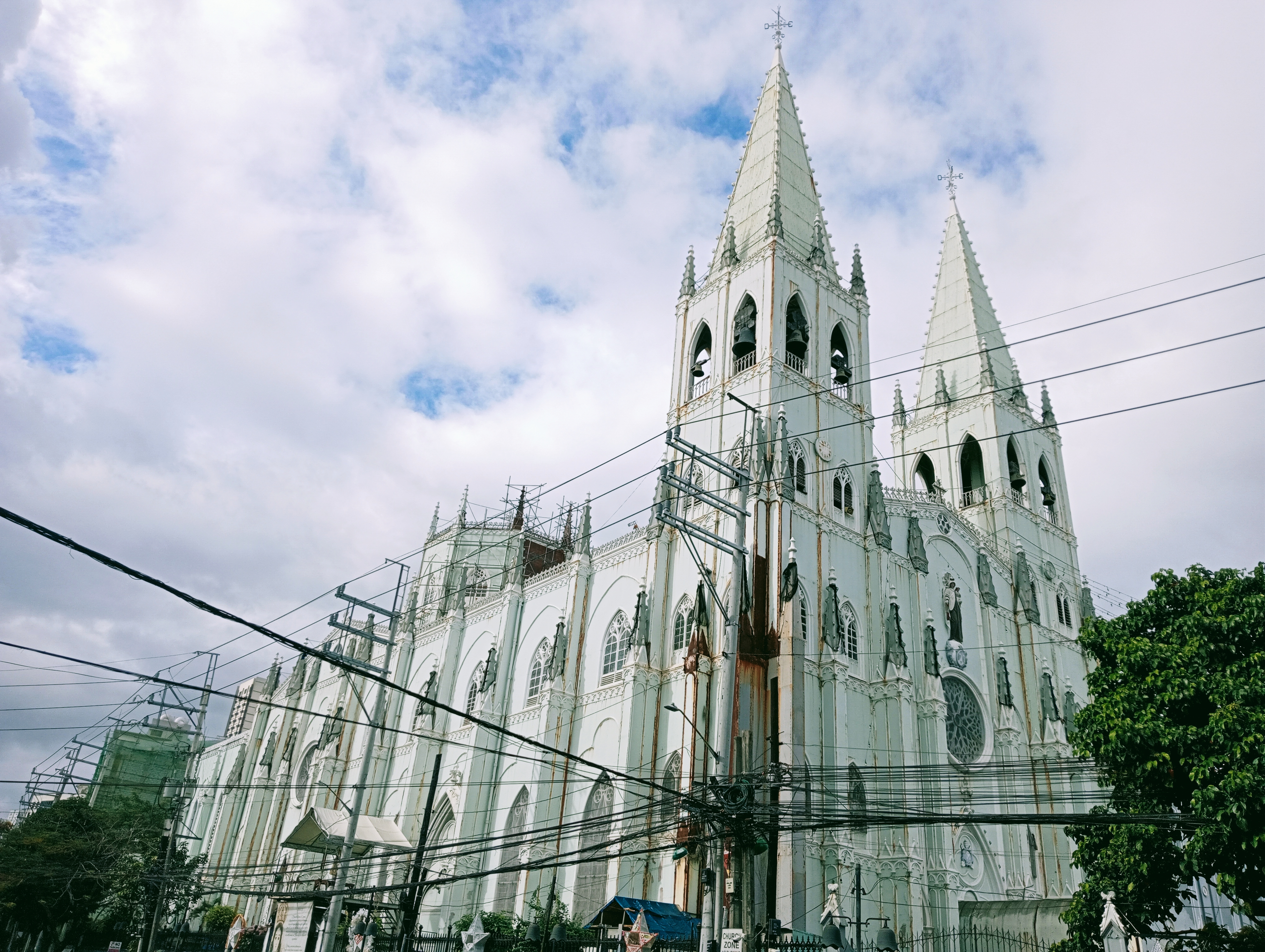
The Minor Basilica of San Sebastián is the only all-steel church in Asia.

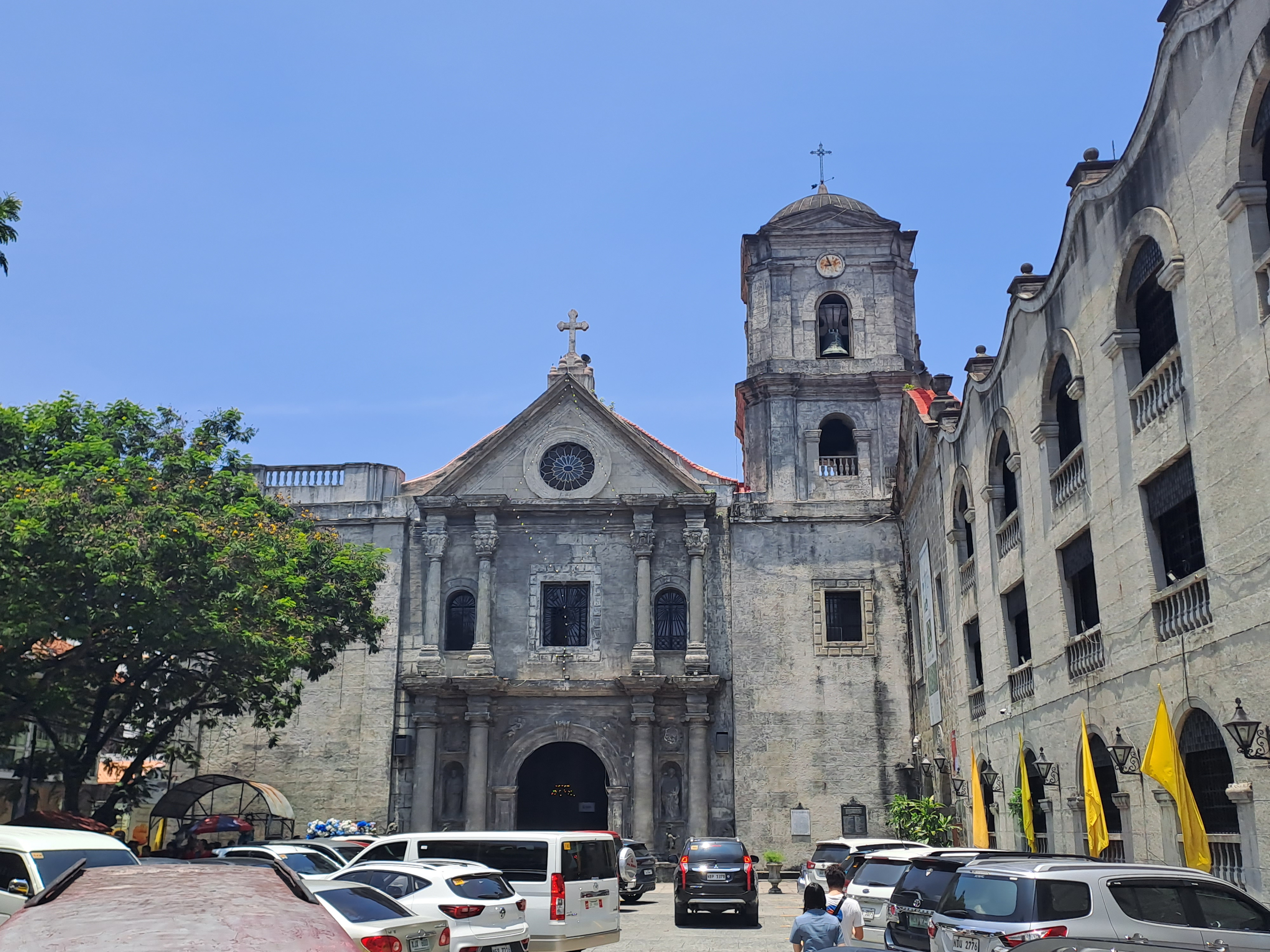
San Agustín Church in Intramuros, a UNESCO World Heritage Site

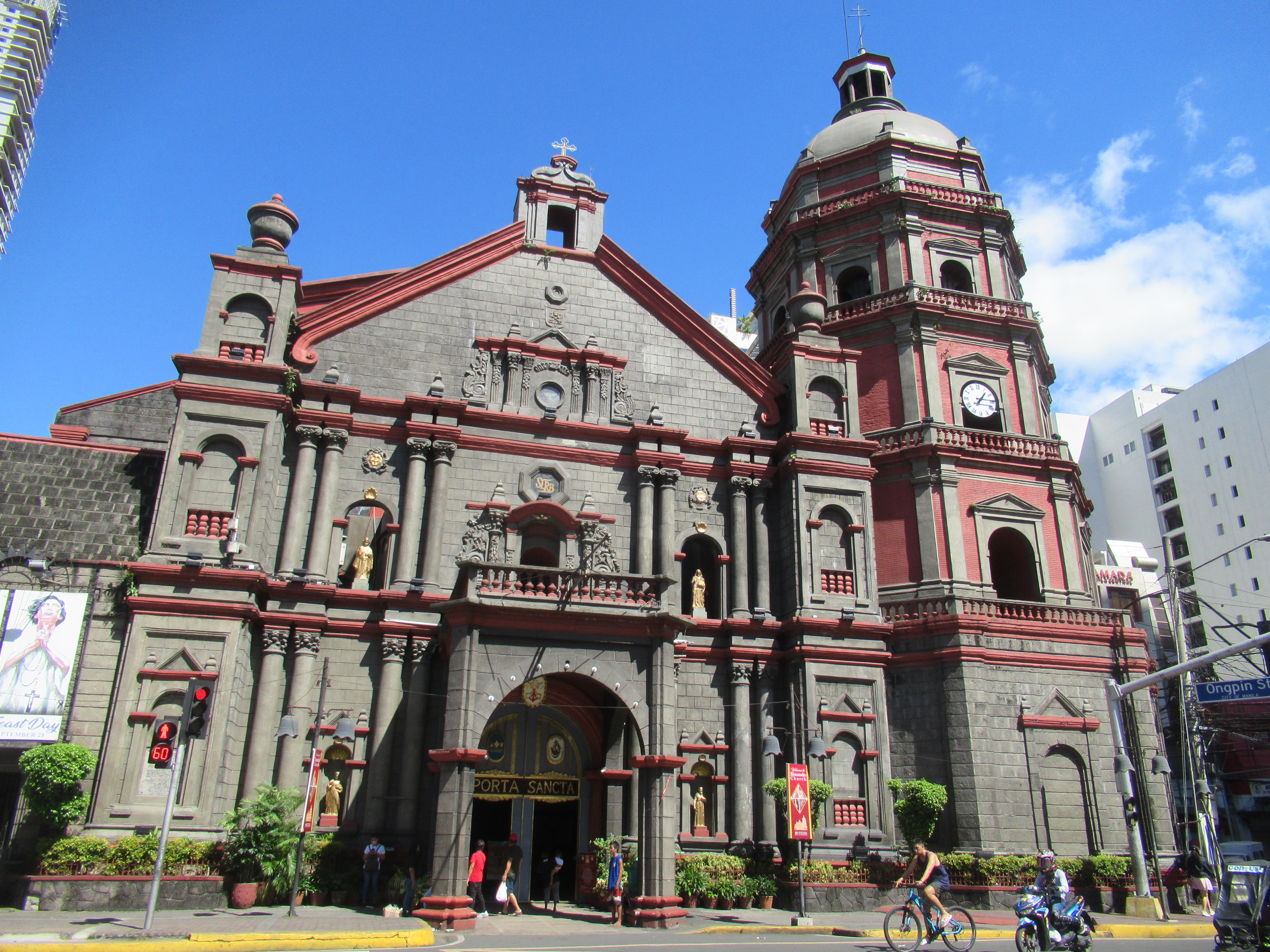
Binondo Church serves the Roman Catholic Chinese community.

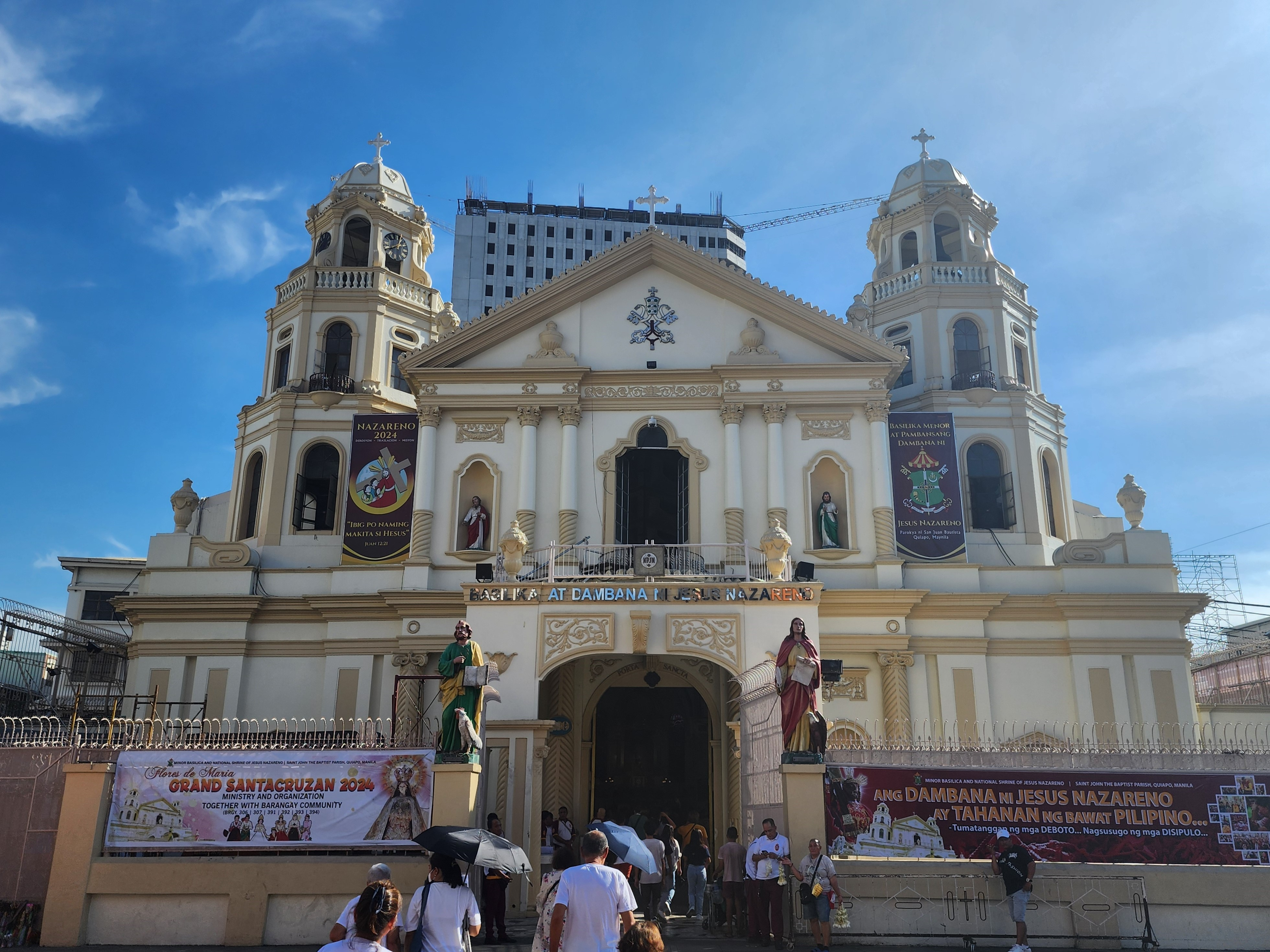
Quiapo Church, home of the iconic Black Nazarene, whose Traslacion feast is celebrated every January 9

==== Other faiths ====
Manila has many Taoist and Buddhist temples like Seng Guan Temple that serve the spiritual needs of the Chinese Filipino community. Quiapo has a "Muslim town" that includes the city's largest mosque Masjid Al-Dahab. Members of the Indian expatriate community can worship at the large Hindu temple in the city or at the Sikh gurdwara on United Nations Avenue. The Baháʼí Faith's governing body in the Philippines the National Spiritual Assembly is headquartered near Manila's eastern boundary with Makati.

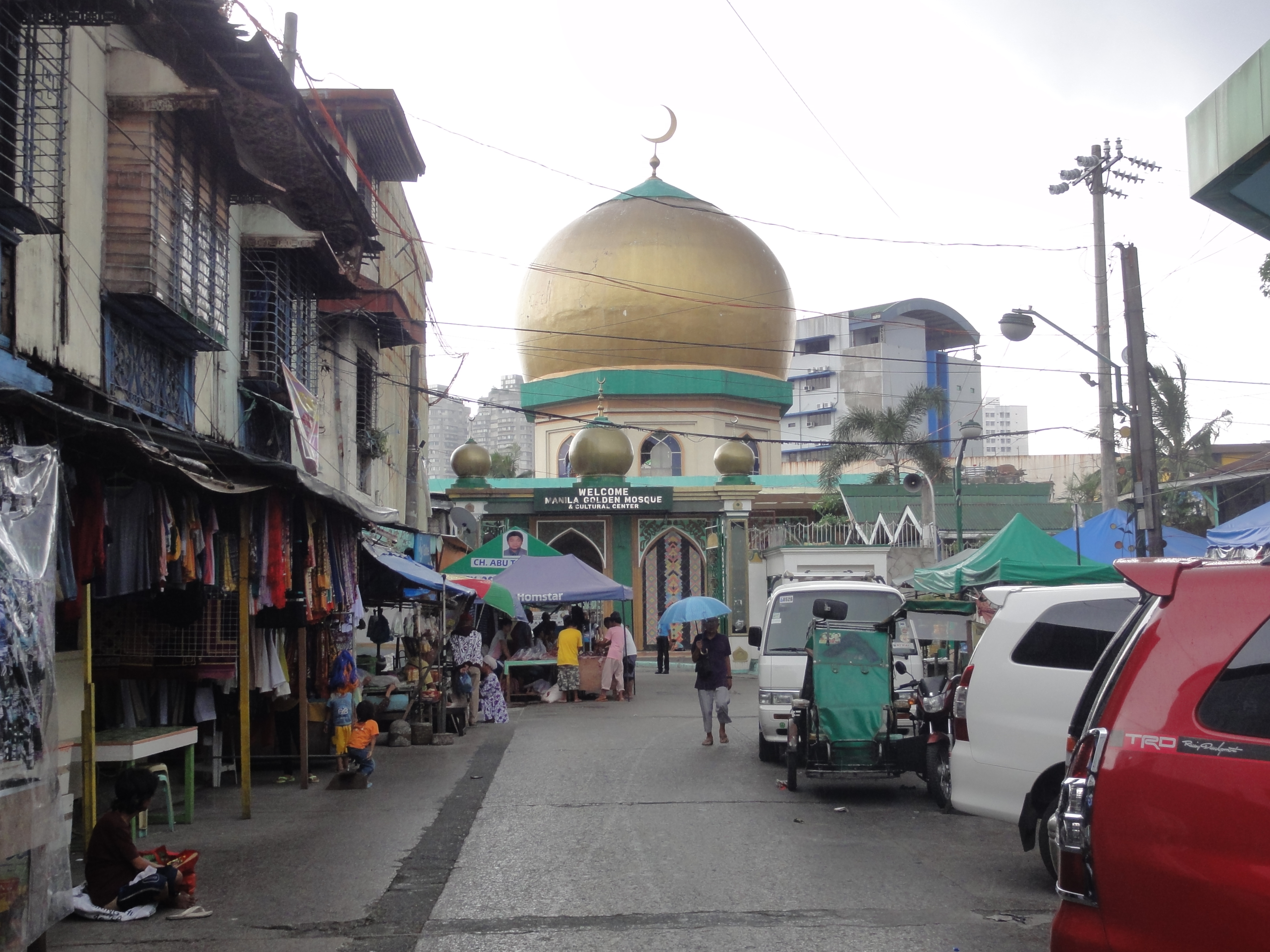
The Masjid Al-Dahab is considered as the largest mosque in Metro Manila

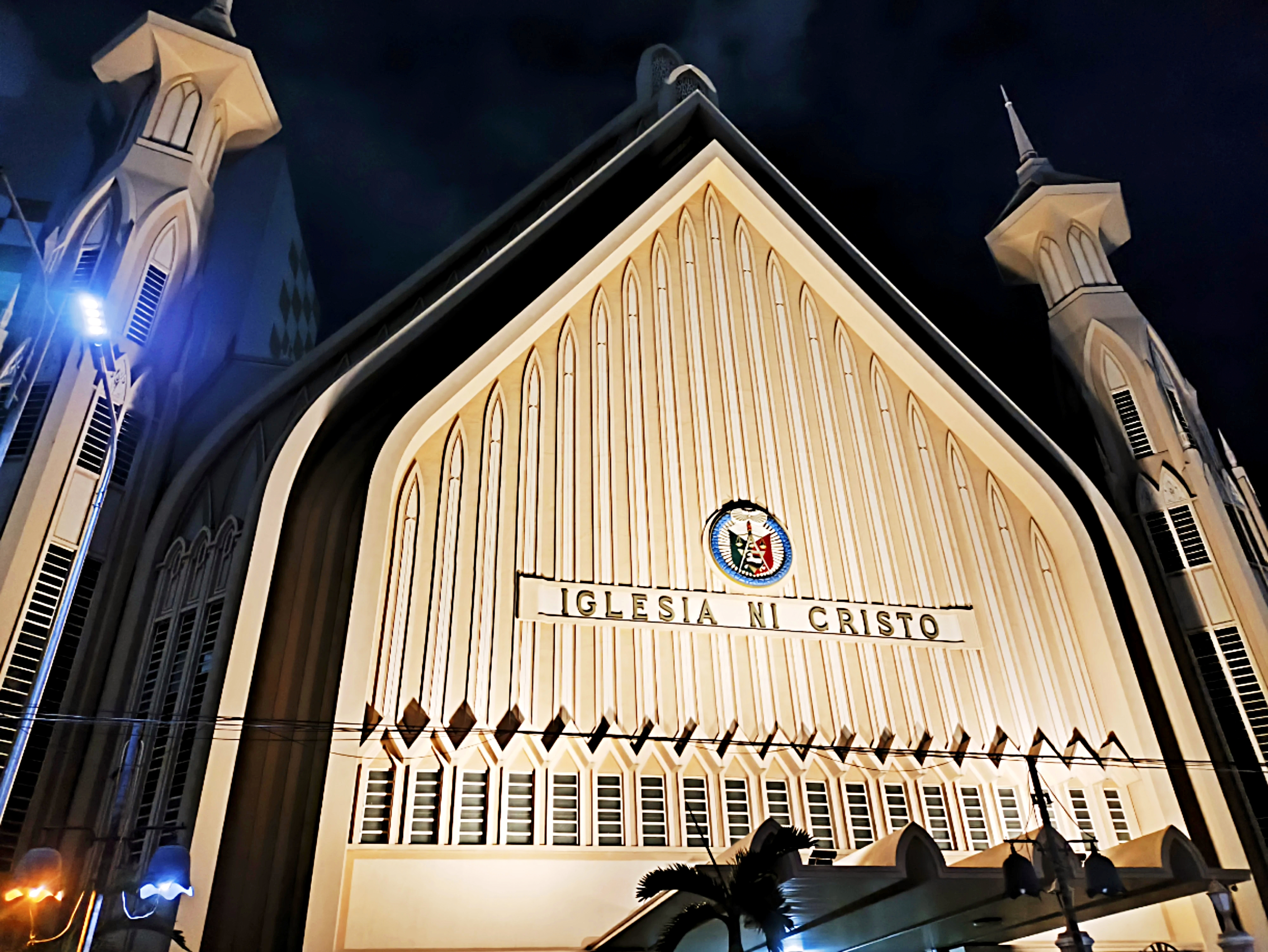
The Iglesia ni Cristo (INC) Lokal ng Tondo, established on November 6, 1915, is one of the earliest congregations of the church

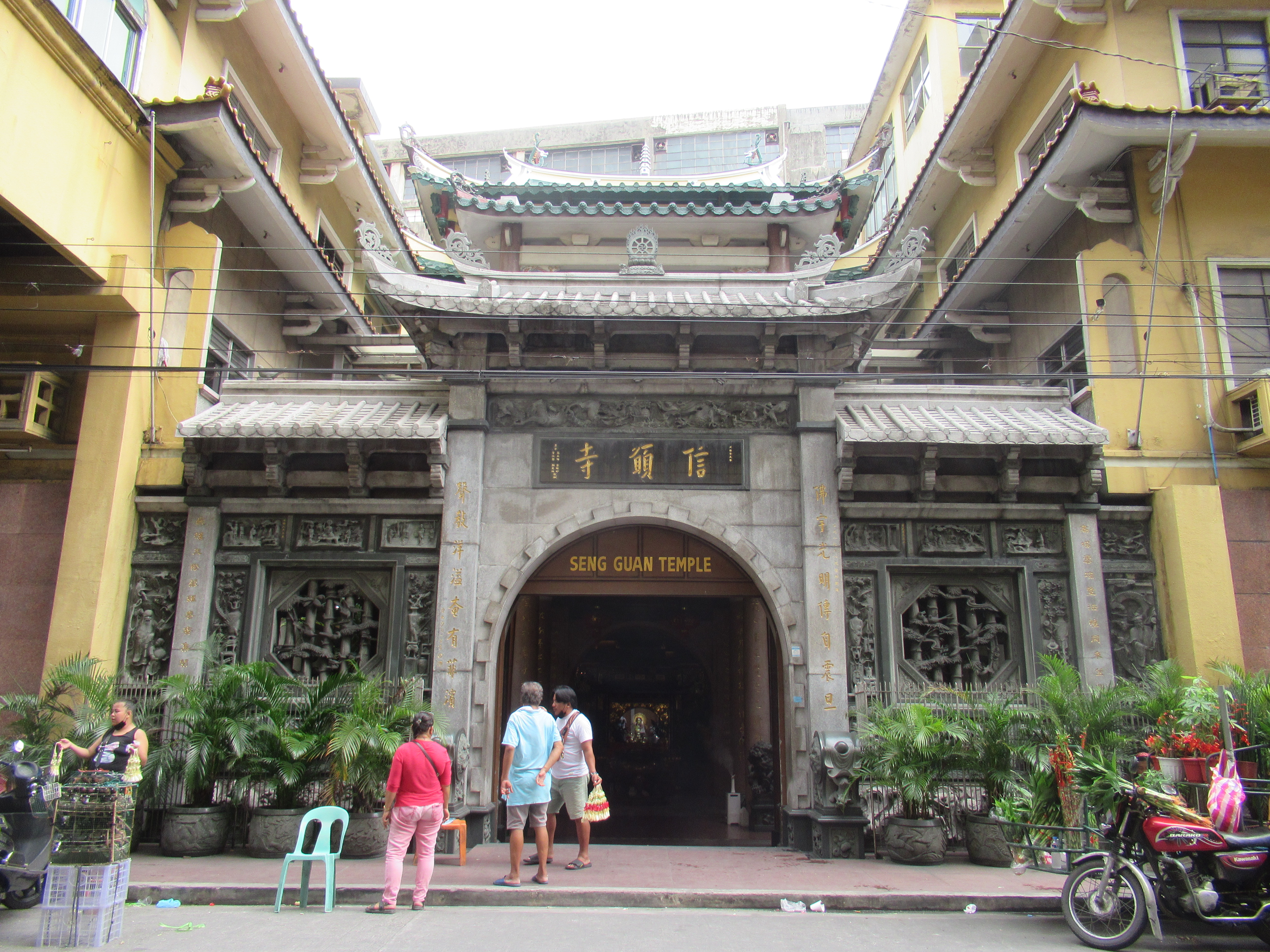
Seng Guan Temple

== Economy ==
Poverty incidence of Manila (%)

Source: Philippine Statistics Authority

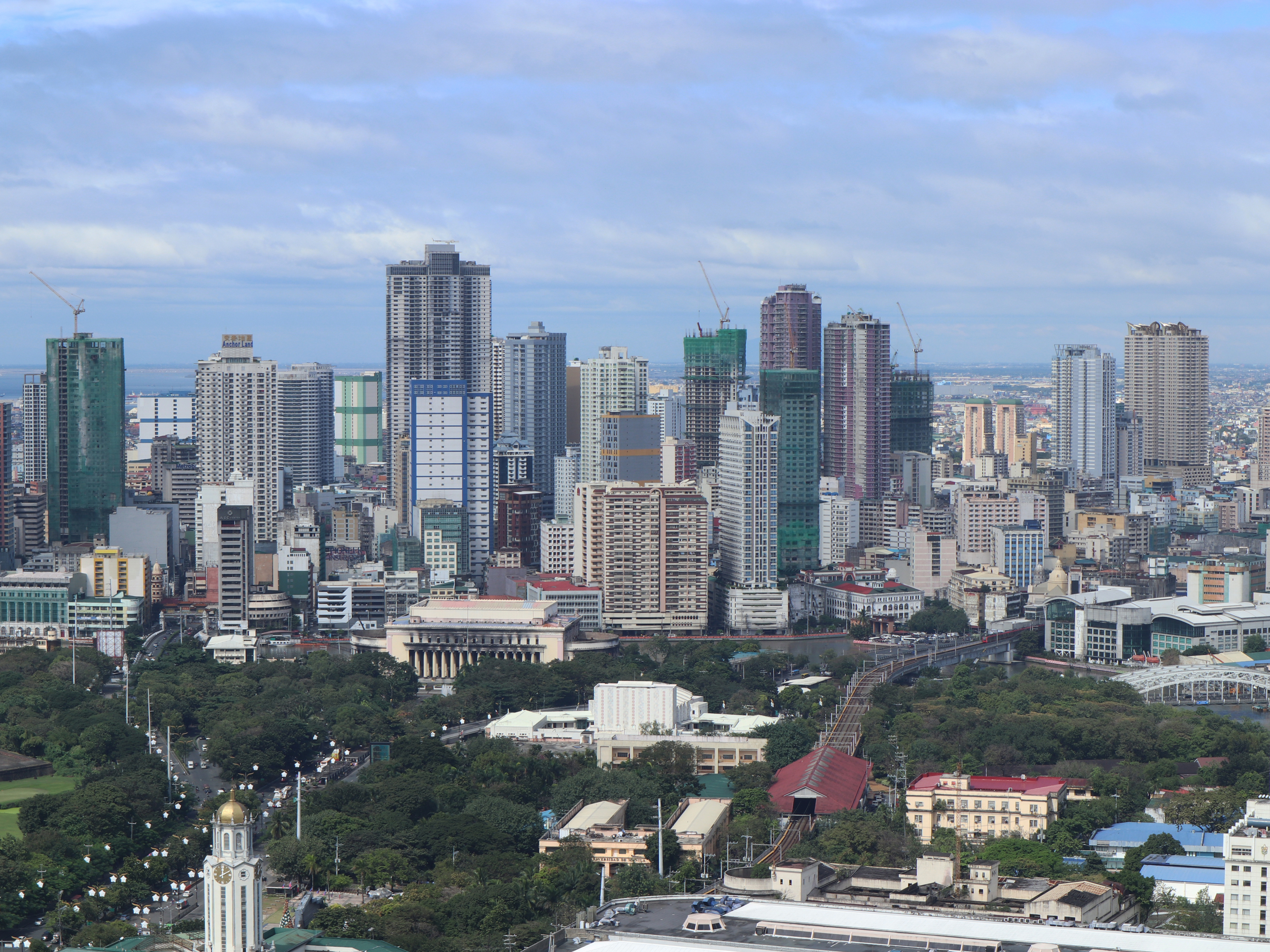
Skyline of Binondo, the central business district of the city of Manila.

Manila is a major center for commerce, banking and finance, retailing, transportation, tourism, real estate, new media, traditional media, advertising, legal services, accounting, insurance, theater, fashion, and the arts. Around 60,000 establishments operate in the city. In 2024, Manila is the 4th largest economy in the Philippines, with a 4.7% share to the national gross domestic product totaling ₱1.04 trillion. Manila has the 7th highest per capita GDP of the country at ₱510,826 (US$9,500).

The National Competitiveness Council of the Philippines, which annually publishes the Cities and Municipalities Competitiveness Index (CMCI), ranks the country's cities, municipalities, and provinces according to their economic dynamism, government efficiency, and infrastructure. According to the 2022 CMCI, Manila was the second-most-competitive highly urbanized city in the Philippines. Manila held the title of the country's most-competitive city in 2015, and since then has been in the top three, denoting Manila is consistently one of the best place to live in and do business. The city has an estimated GDP of ₱987.88 billion and is the 3rd largest economy of the National Capital Region, accounting for 15% of the region's total economy as of 2023.

Binondo, the oldest and one of the largest Chinatowns in the world, was the center of commerce and business activities in the city. Numerous residential and office skyscrapers occupy its medieval streets. As of 2013, plans by the city government of Manila to turn the Chinatown area into a business process outsourcing (BPO) hub were in progress; thirty unoccupied buildings had been already identified for conversion into BPO offices. Most of these buildings are on Escolta Street, Binondo.

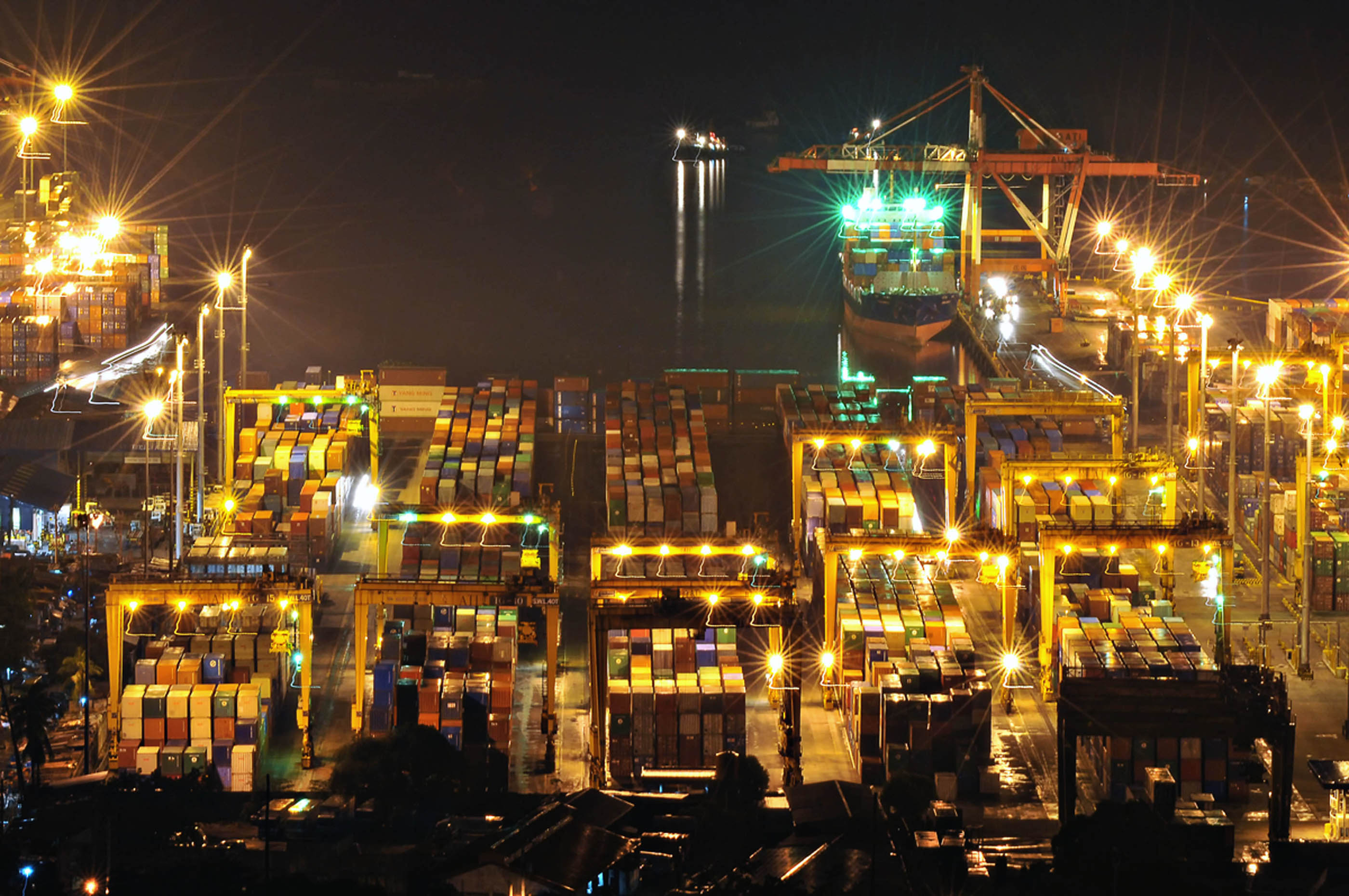
View of the Manila International Container Terminal, the chief port of the Philippines

The Port of Manila is the largest seaport in the Philippines and the main international shipping route into the country. The Philippine Ports Authority oversees the operation and management of the country's ports. International Container Terminal Services Inc., according to the Asian Development Bank, is one of the top-five major maritime terminal operators in the world, and has its headquarters and main operations at the Port of Manila. Another port operator, Asian Terminal Incorporated, has its corporate office and main operations at Manila South Harbor, and its container depository is in Santa Mesa. Manila is classified as a Medium-Port Megacity, using the Southampton system for port-city classification.

Manufacturers within the city produce industrial-related products such as chemicals, textiles, clothing, electronic goods, food, beverages, and tobacco products. Local businesses process primary commodities for export, including rope, plywood, refined sugar, copra, and coconut oil. The food-processing industry is one of the most-stable manufacturing sector in the city.

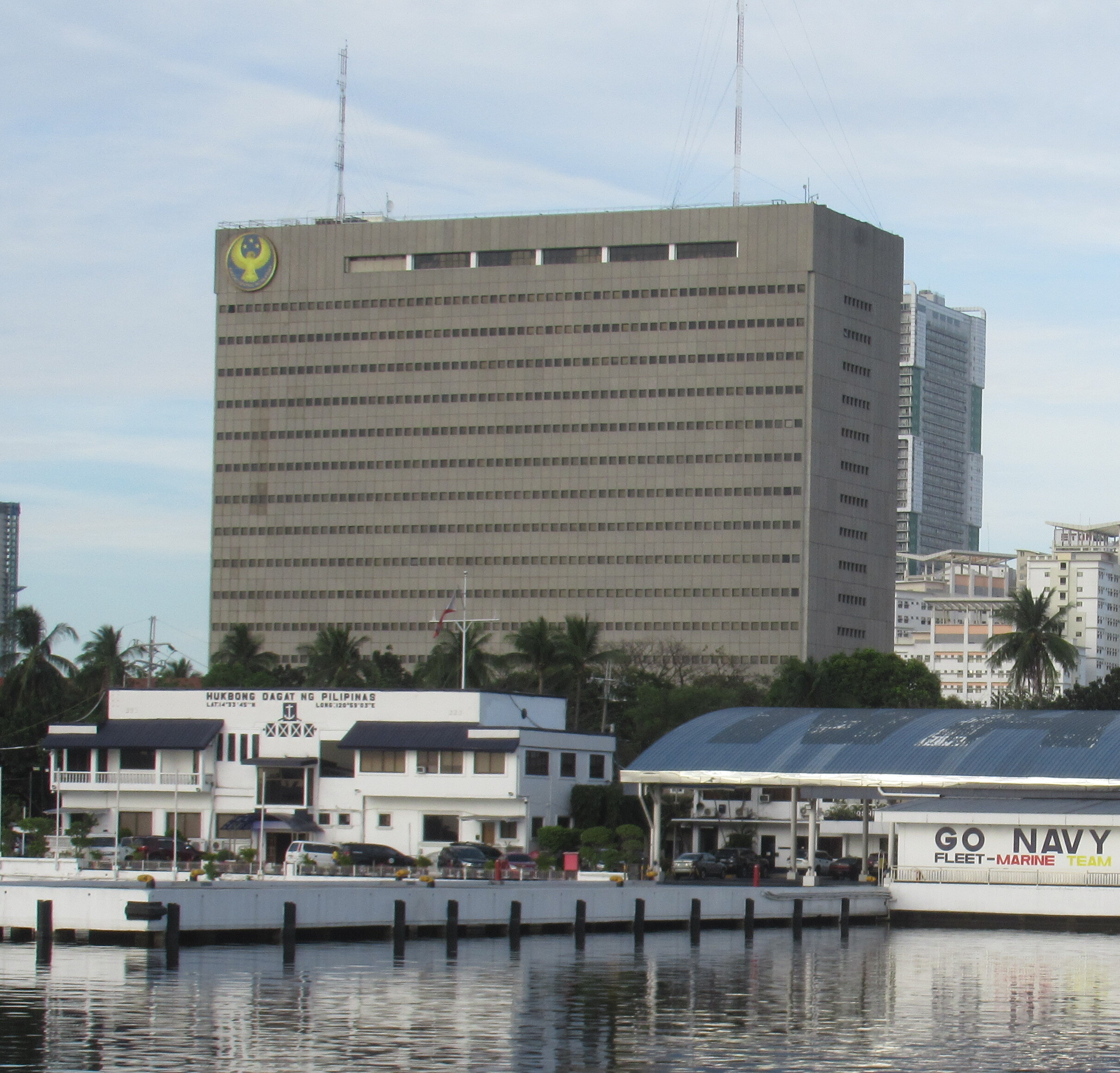
Bangko Sentral ng Pilipinas headquarters

Pandacan oil depot houses the storage facilities and distribution terminals of Caltex Philippines, Pilipinas Shell, and Petron Corporation; the major players in the country's petroleum industry. The oil depot has been a subject of various concerns, including its environmental and health impact on the residents of Manila. The Supreme Court ordered the oil depot to be relocated outside the city by July 2015, but it failed to meet this deadline. Most of the oil depot facility inside the 33-hectare (82-acre) compound were demolished, and plans have been made to convert it into a transport hub or food park.

Manila is a major publishing center of the Philippines. Manila Bulletin, the Philippines' largest broadsheet newspaper by circulation, is headquartered in Intramuros. Other major publishing companies in the country The Manila Times, The Philippine Star, and Manila Standard Today are headquartered in the Port Area. The Chinese Commercial News, the Philippines' oldest existing Chinese-language newspaper, and the country's third-oldest newspaper, is headquartered in Binondo. DWRK used to have its studio at the FEMS Tower 1 along Osmeña Highway in Malate before transferring to the MBC Building at the CCP Complex in 2008.

Manila serves as the headquarters of the Bangko Sentral ng Pilipinas, which is located on Roxas Boulevard. The Landbank of the Philippines and Philippine Trust Company also have their headquarters in Manila. Unilever Philippines used to have its corporate office on United Nations Avenue in Paco before transferring to Bonifacio Global City in 2016. Vehicle manufacturer Toyota also has its regional office on UN Avenue.

=== Tourism ===
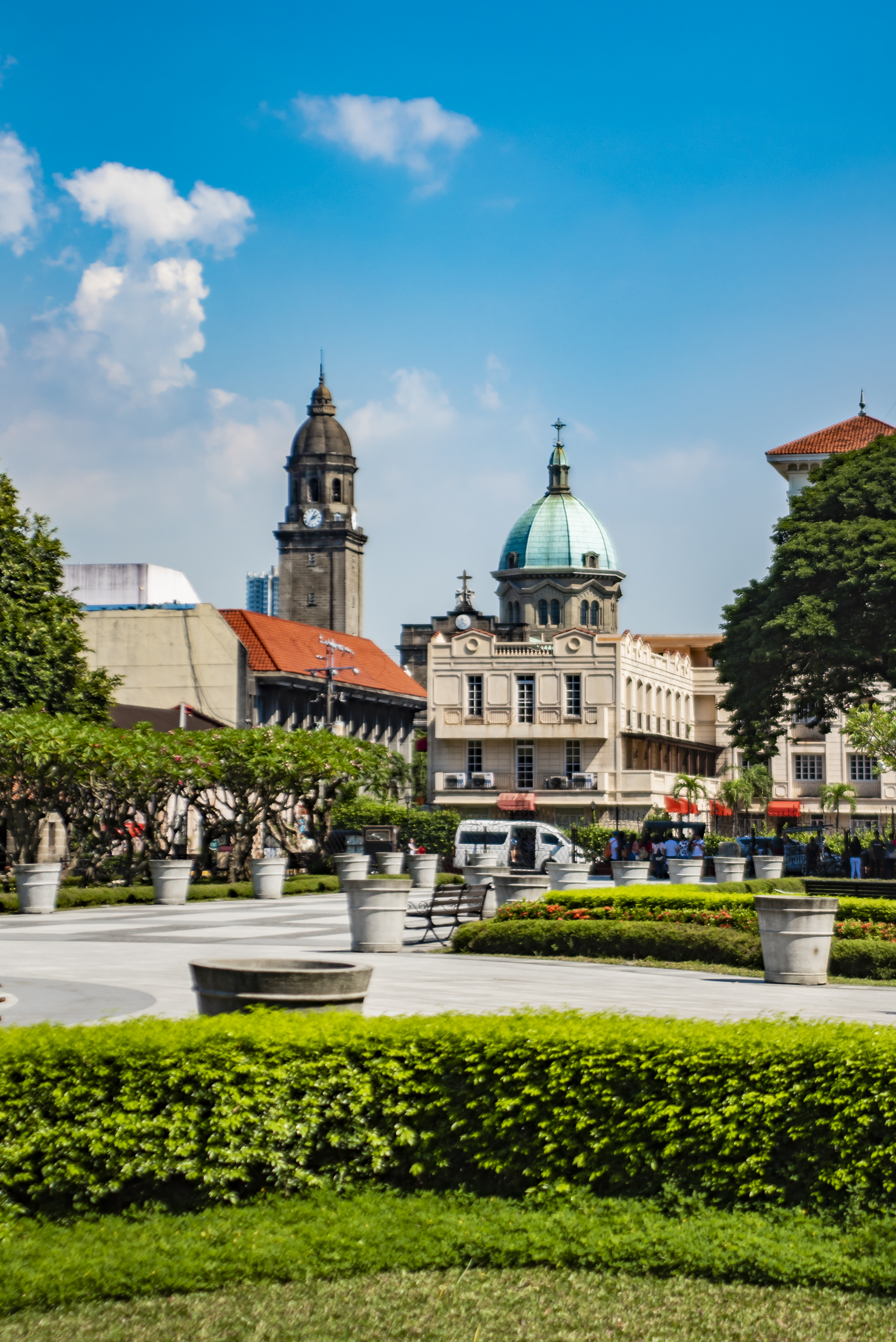
The historic Plaza Moriones with the Manila Cathedral in the background.

Manila welcomes over one million tourists each year. Major tourist destinations include the historic Walled City of Intramuros, the Cultural Center of the Philippines Complex, (Note: The city limits was at Vicente Sotto Street. The rest of the place south of the street belongs to Pasay. Buildings and structures in CCP that falls under the jurisdiction of Manila includes the National Theater.) Manila Ocean Park, Binondo (Chinatown), Ermita, Malate, Manila Zoo, the National Museum Complex, and Rizal Park. Both the historic Walled City of Intramuros and Rizal Park were designated as flagship destinations and as tourism enterprise zones in the Tourism Act of 2009.

Rizal Park, also known as Luneta Park, is a national park and the largest urban park in Asia. with an area of 58 hectares (140 acres), The park was constructed to honor of the country's national hero José Rizal, who was executed by the Spaniards on charges of subversion. The flagpole west of the Rizal Monument is the Kilometer Zero marker for distances to locations across the country. The park is managed by the National Parks and Development Committee.

The 0.67-square-kilometer (0.26 sq mi) Walled City of Intramuros is the historic center of Manila. It is administered by the Intramuros Administration, an attached agency of the Department of Tourism. It contains Manila Cathedral and the 18th Century San Agustin Church, a UNESCO World Heritage Site. Kalesa is a popular mode of transportation for tourists in Intramuros and nearby places including Binondo, Ermita and Rizal Park. Binondo, the oldest Chinatown in the world, was established in 1521 and served as a hub of Chinese commerce before the Spaniards colonized the Philippines. Its main attractions are Binondo Church, Filipino-Chinese Friendship Arch, Seng Guan Buddhist Temple, and authentic Chinese restaurants.

Manila is designated as the country's leading destination for medical tourism, which is estimated to annually generate $1 billion in revenue. Lack of a progressive health system, inadequate infrastructure, and the unstable political environment are seen as hindrances to its growth.

=== Shopping ===
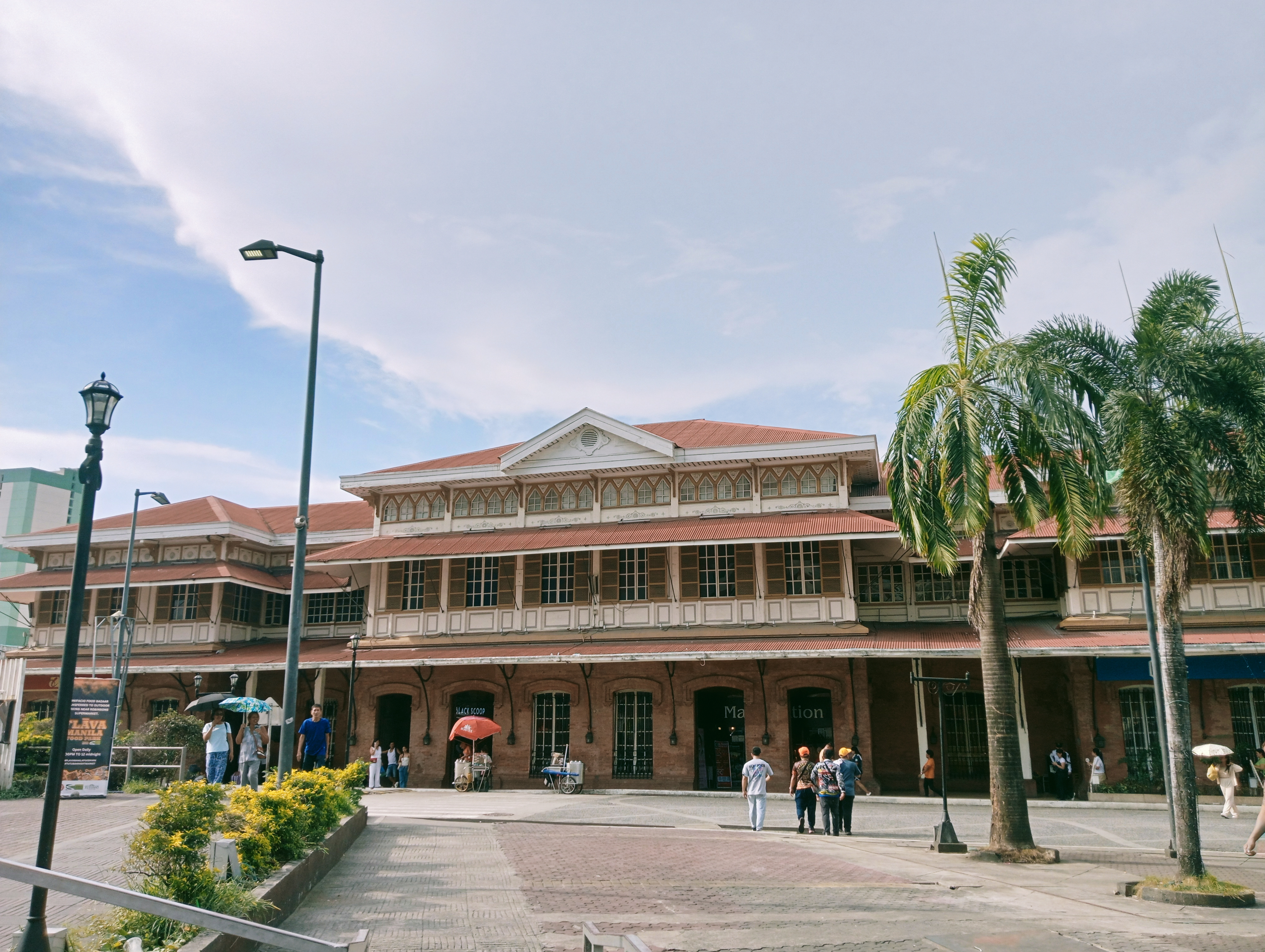
The old Tutuban Main Station built in 1892, which is now converted to a shopping mall

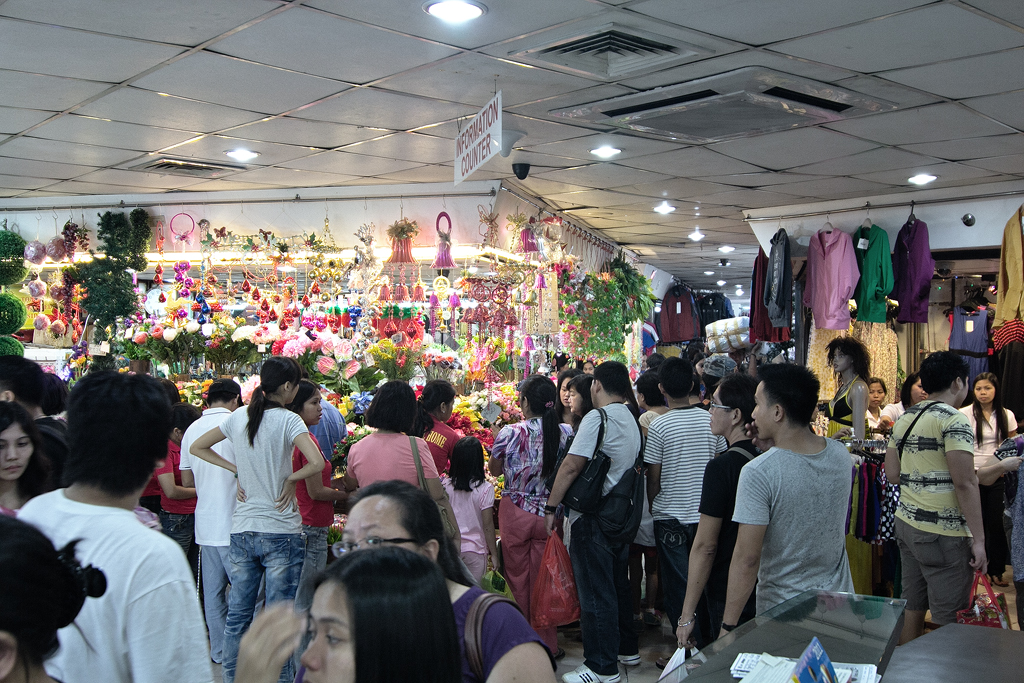
Divisoria is a popular flea market for locals and tourists. Shown is the interior of 168 Shopping Mall.

Manila is regarded as one of the best shopping destinations in Asia. Major shopping malls, department stores, markets, supermarkets, and bazaars are located within the city.

Divisoria in Tondo has been locally described as a "shopping mecca" of Manila. Shopping malls sell goods at bargain prices. Small vendors occupy several roads, causing pedestrian and vehicular traffic. A well-known landmark in Divisoria is the Tutuban Center, a large shopping mall that is a part of the Philippine National Railways' Main Station. It attracts 1 million people every month and is expected to add another 400,000 people upon the completion of the LRT Line 2 West Extension, making it Manila's busiest transfer station. Another "lifestyle mall" is Lucky Chinatown. There are almost 1 million shoppers in Divisoria according to the Manila Police District.

Binondo, the oldest Chinatown in the world, is the city's center of commerce and trade for all types of businesses run by Filipino-Chinese merchants, with a wide variety of shops and restaurants. Quiapo is referred to as the "Old Downtown", where tiangges, markets, boutique shops, music and electronics stores are common. Many department stores are on Recto Avenue.

Robinsons Place Manila is Manila's largest shopping mall. The mall was the second and the largest Robinsons Malls built. SM Supermalls operates the shopping malls SM City Manila and SM City San Lazaro. SM City Manila is located on the former site of YMCA Manila beside Manila City Hall in Ermita, while SM City San Lazaro is built on the site of the former San Lazaro Hippodrome in Santa Cruz. The building of the former Manila Royal Hotel in Quiapo, which is known for its revolving restaurant, is now the SM Clearance Center and was established in 1972. The site of the first SM Department Store is Carlos Palanca Sr. (formerly Echague) Street in San Miguel.

== Culture ==
=== Museums ===
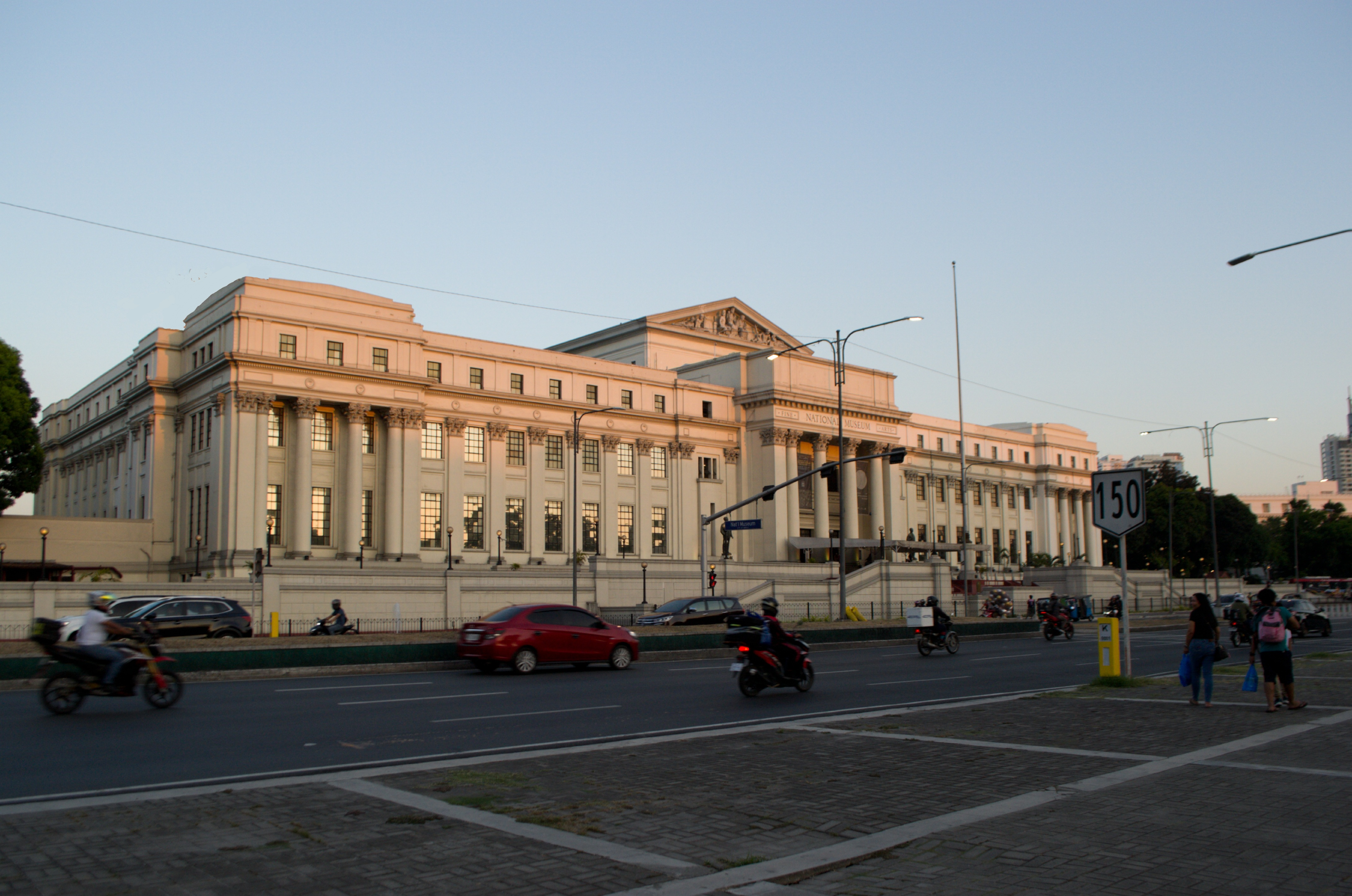
The National Museum of Fine Arts

As the cultural center of the Philippines, Manila has a number of museums. The National Museum Complex of the National Museum of the Philippines, located in Rizal Park, is composed of the National Museum of Fine Arts, the National Museum of Anthropology, the National Museum of Natural History, and the National Planetarium. Spoliarium, a famous painting by Juan Luna, can be found in the complex.

The city hosts the National Library of the Philippines, a repository of the country's printed and recorded cultural heritage, and other literary and information resources. The National Historical Commission of the Philippines maintains two history museums in the city, which are the Museo ni Apolinario Mabini – PUP and the Museo ni Jose Rizal – Fort Santiago. Museums established or run by the National Library and by educational institutions such as DLS-CSB Museum of Contemporary Art and Design, UST Museum of Arts and Sciences, and the UP Museum of a History of Ideas are located in the city.

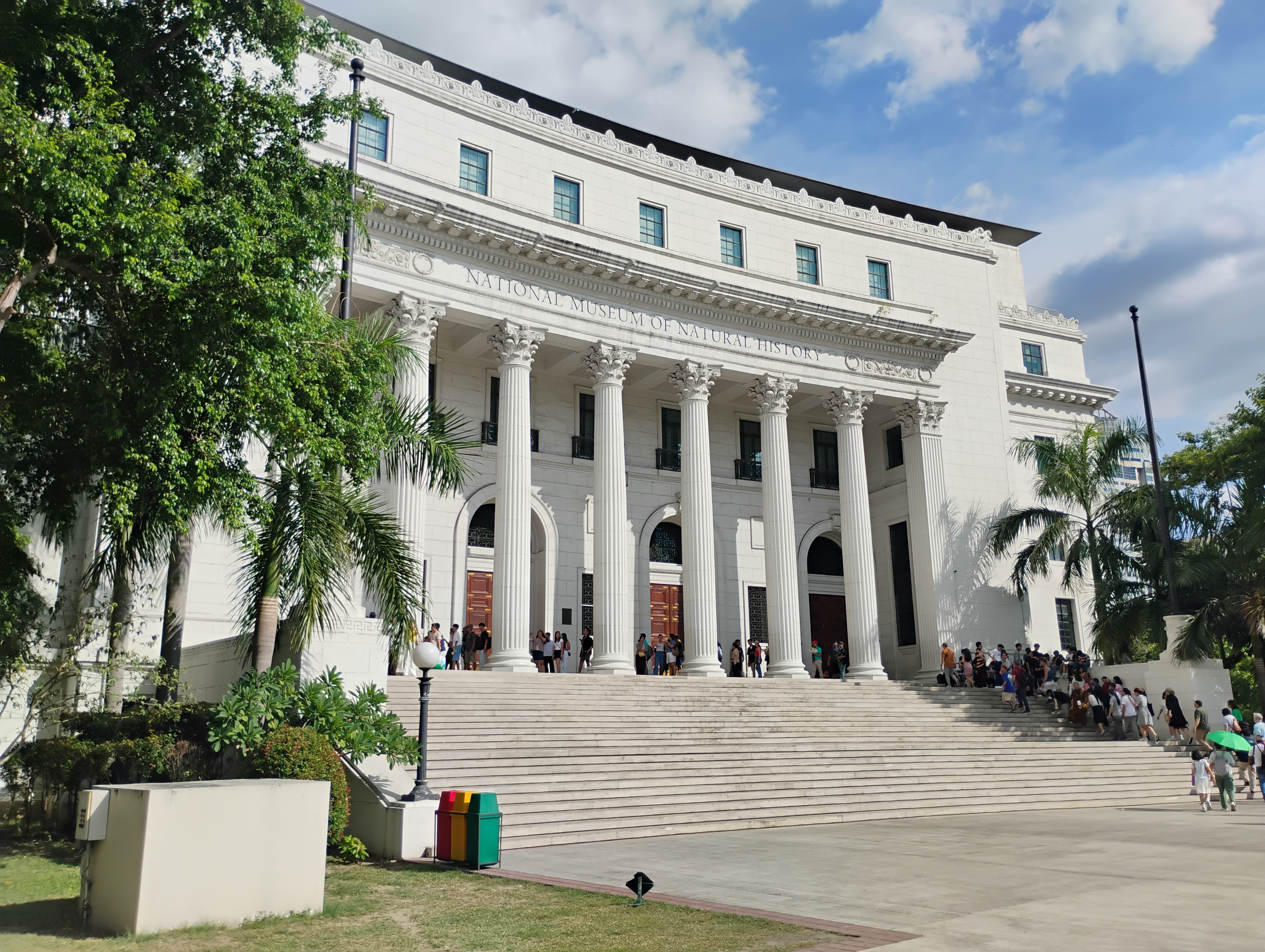
National Museum of Natural History at Agrifina Circle, Rizal Park

Bahay Tsinoy, one of Manila's prominent museums, documents the lives of Chinese people and their contributions to the history of the Philippines. Intramuros Light and Sound Museum chronicles Filipinos' desire for freedom during the revolution under Rizal's leadership and other revolutionary leaders. The Metropolitan Museum of Manila houses modern and contemporary visual arts, and exhibits Filipino arts and culture.

Other museums in the city are the Museo Pambata, a children's museum; and Plaza San Luis, an outdoor heritage public museum that includes nine Spanish Bahay na Bato houses. Ecclesiastical museums located in the city are the Parish of the Our Lady of the Abandoned in Santa Ana; San Agustin Church Museum; and the Museo de Intramuros, which houses the ecclesiastical art collection of the Intramuros Administration in the reconstructed San Ignacio Church and Convent.

=== Sports ===
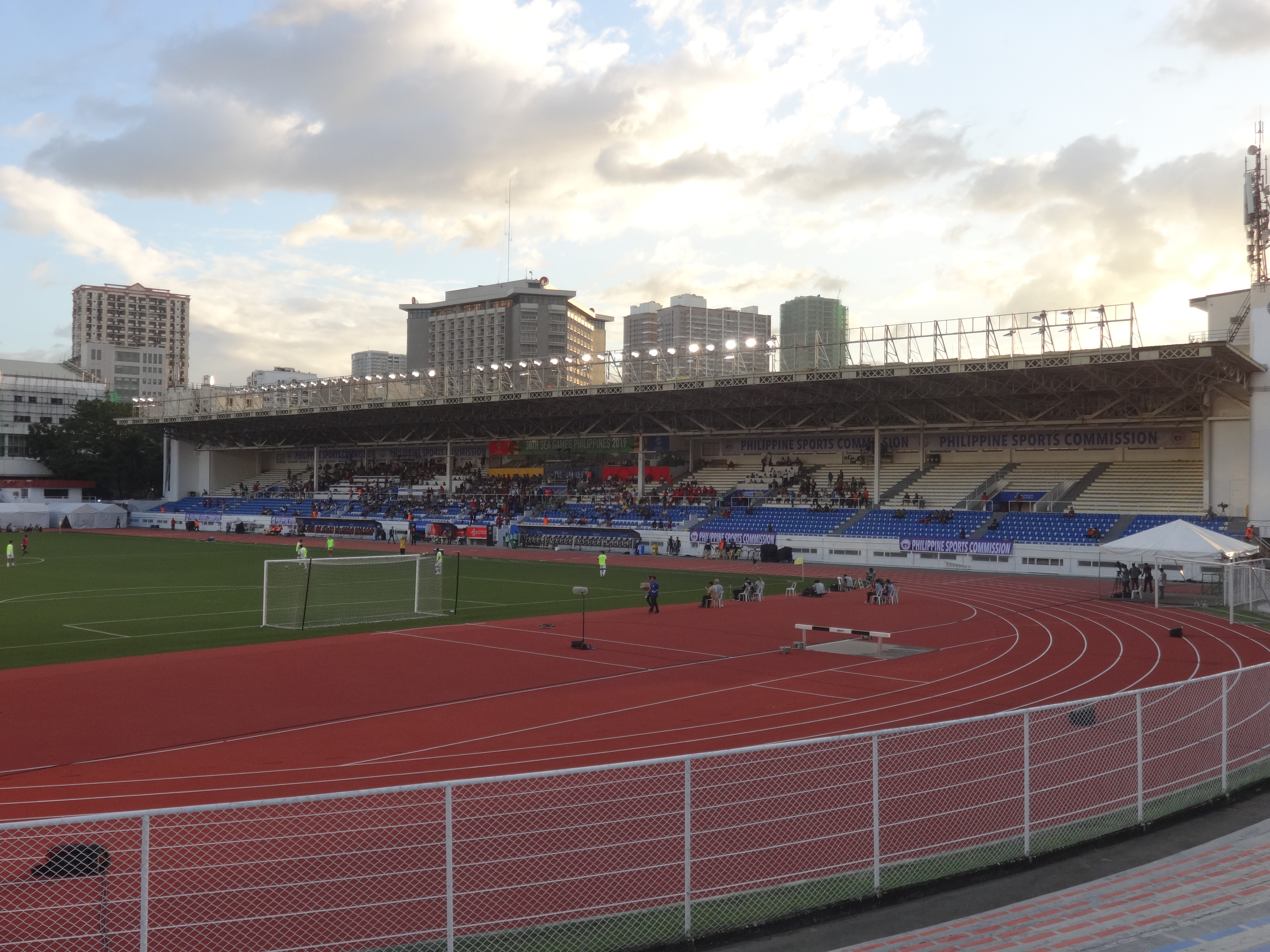
Ground view of the city-owned Rizal Memorial Stadium, part of the Rizal Memorial Sports Complex.

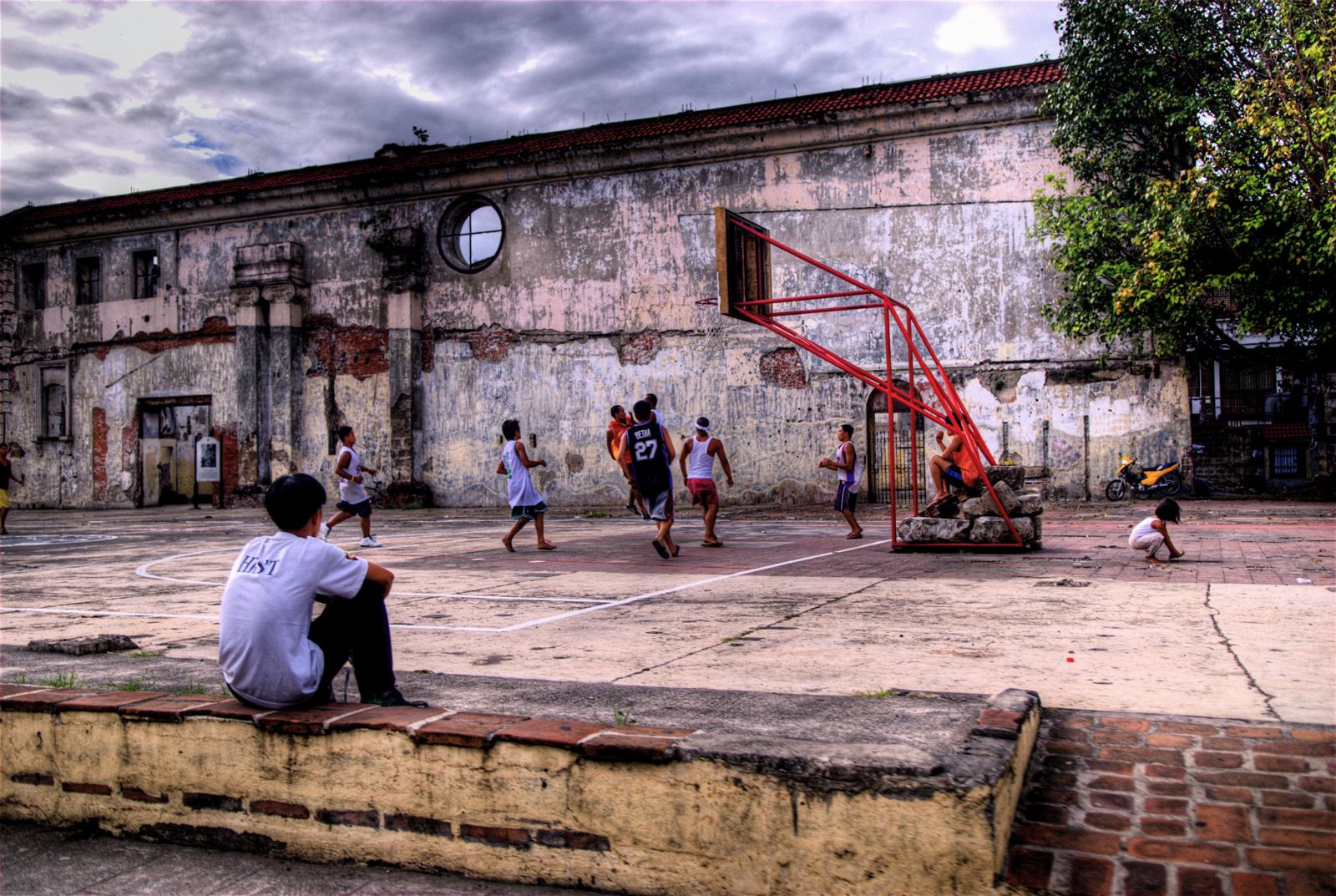
Children playing basketball at the ruins of San Ignacio Church in Intramuros

Sports in Manila have a long and distinguished history. The city's, and in general the country's, main sport is basketball. Most barangays have a basketball court or a makeshift one, and court markings are frequently drawn on the streets. Larger barangays have covered courts where inter-barangay leagues are held every April to May. Manila's major sports venues include Rizal Memorial Sports Complex and San Andres Gym, the base of the now-defunct Manila Metrostars.

Rizal Memorial Sports Complex houses a track and football stadium, a baseball stadium, tennis courts, Rizal Memorial Coliseum, and Ninoy Aquino Stadium; the latter two are indoor arenas. The Rizal complex had hosted several multi-sport events, such as the 1954 Asian Games and the 1934 Far Eastern Games. When the Philippines hosts the Southeast Asian Games, most of the events are held at the complex but in the 2005 Games, most events were held elsewhere. The 1960 ABC Championship and the 1973 ABC Championship, forerunners of the FIBA Asia Championship, were hosted at the memorial coliseum; the national basketball team won both tournaments. The 1978 FIBA World Championship was held at the coliseum although the latter stages were held in the Araneta Coliseum in Quezon City.

Manila has several other well-known sports facilities such as Enrique M. Razon Sports Center and the University of Santo Tomas Sports Complex, both of which are private venues owned by a university; collegiate sports are also held in the city; the University Athletic Association of the Philippines and the National Collegiate Athletic Association basketball games held at Rizal Memorial Coliseum and Ninoy Aquino Stadium, although basketball events have been transferred to San Juan's Filoil Flying V Arena and Araneta Coliseum in Quezon City.

Other collegiate sports are still held at Rizal Memorial Sports Complex. Professional basketball, which has been mostly organized by corporate teams, also used to play at the city but the Philippine Basketball Association now holds their games at Araneta Coliseum and Cuneta Astrodome at Pasay; the now-defunct Philippine Basketball League played some of their games, such as its 1995–96 Philippine Basketball League season, at Rizal Memorial Sports Complex.

Manila Metrostars participated in the Metropolitan Basketball Association. The Metrostars, named after the Metrostar Express – the brand name of the Metro Manila MRT-3, which does not have stations in the city – participated in its first three seasons and won the 1999 championship. The Metrostars later merged with the Batangas Blades and subsequently played in Lipa, Batangas. Almost twenty years later, Manila Stars participated in the Maharlika Pilipinas Basketball League, reaching the Northern Division Finals in 2019. Both teams played in the San Andres Sports Complex. Other teams that represented Manila but did not host games in the city are the Manila Jeepney F.C. and FC Meralco Manila. The city's government acknowledged Jeepney as Manila's representative in the United Football League. Meralco Manila played in the Philippines Football League and designated Rizal Memorial Stadium as their home ground.

Manila's rugby league team Manila Storm trains at Rizal Park and plays matches at Southern Plains Field, Calamba, Laguna. Baseball was previously a widely played sport in the city but in 2022, Manila had the Philippines' only sizable baseball stadium, Rizal Memorial Baseball Stadium, which hosted games of the now-defunct Baseball Philippines; Lou Gehrig and Babe Ruth were the first players to score a home run at the stadium during their tour of the country on December 2, 1934. Cue sports are also popular in Manila; billiard halls are present in most barangays. The 2010 World Cup of Pool was held at Robinsons Place Manila.

Rizal Memorial Track and Football Stadium hosted the first FIFA World Cup qualifier in decades when the Philippines hosted Sri Lanka in July 2011. The stadium, which was previously unfit for international matches, had been renovated before the match. The stadium also hosted its first rugby test for the 2012 Asian Five Nations Division I tournaments.

=== Festivals and holidays ===
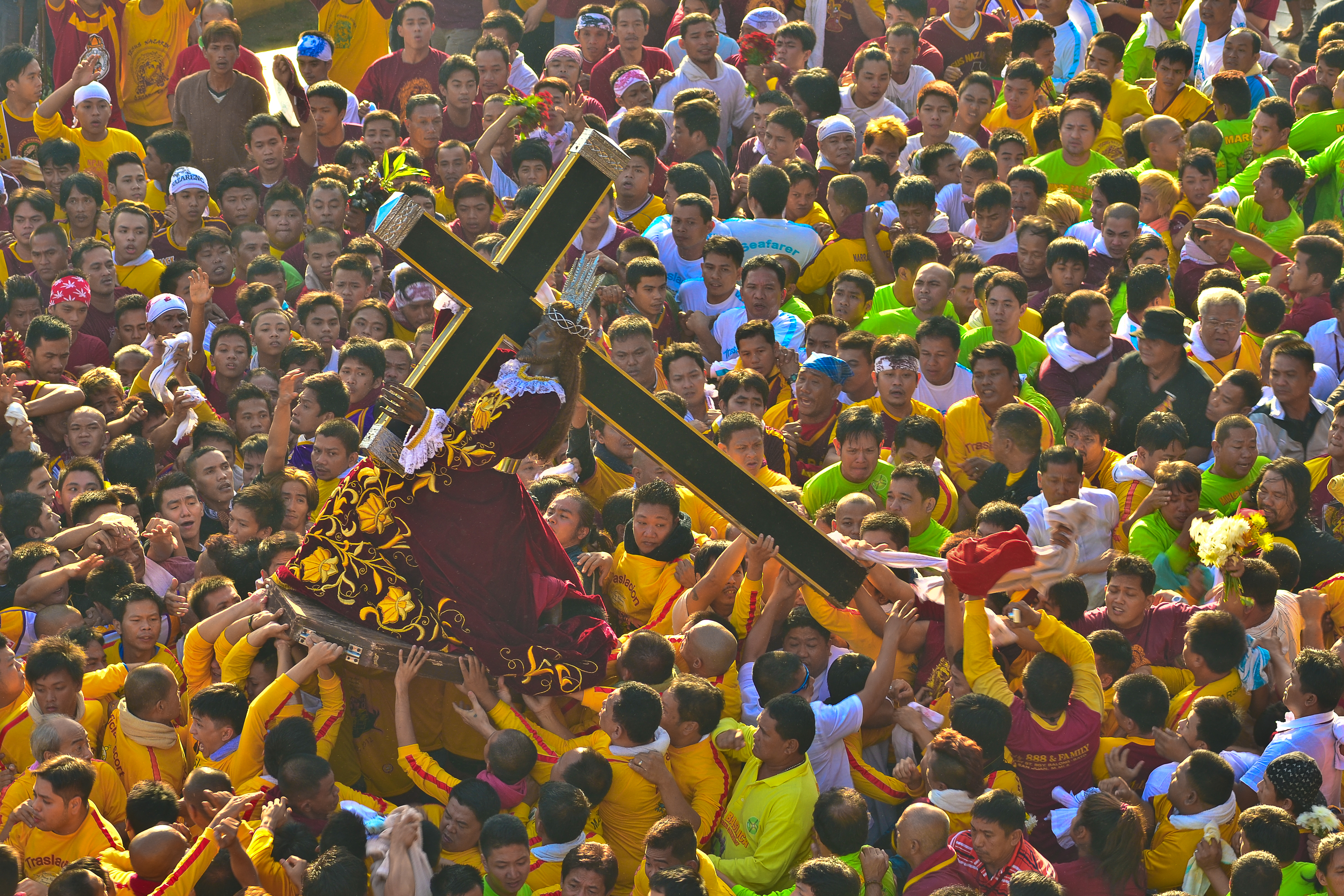
Catholic devotees during the Feast of the Black Nazarene (Traslacíon)

Manila celebrates civic and national holidays. Because most of the city's residents are Roman Catholic, most of the festivals are religious in nature. Araw ng Maynila, which celebrates the city's founding on June 24, 1571 by the Spanish conquistador Miguel López de Legazpi, was first proclaimed by the city's vice mayor Herminio A. Astorga in June 1962. It has been annually commemorated under the patronage of John the Baptist, and has always been declared by the national government as a special, non-working holiday through presidential proclamations. Each of the city's 896 barangays have their own festivities, which are guided by their own patron saints.

Manila also hosts the procession of the Feast of the Black Nazarene (Traslacíon), which is held every January 9 and draws millions of Catholic followers. Other religious festivities held in Manila are the Feast of Santo Niño in Tondo and Pandacan, which is held on the third Sunday of January; the Feast of Nuestra Señora de los Desamparados de Manila (Our Lady of the Abandoned), the patron saint of Santa Ana, which is held every May 12; and the Flores de Mayo. Non-religious holidays include New Year's Day, National Heroes' Day, Bonifacio Day, and Rizal Day.

== Government ==
=== Local government ===
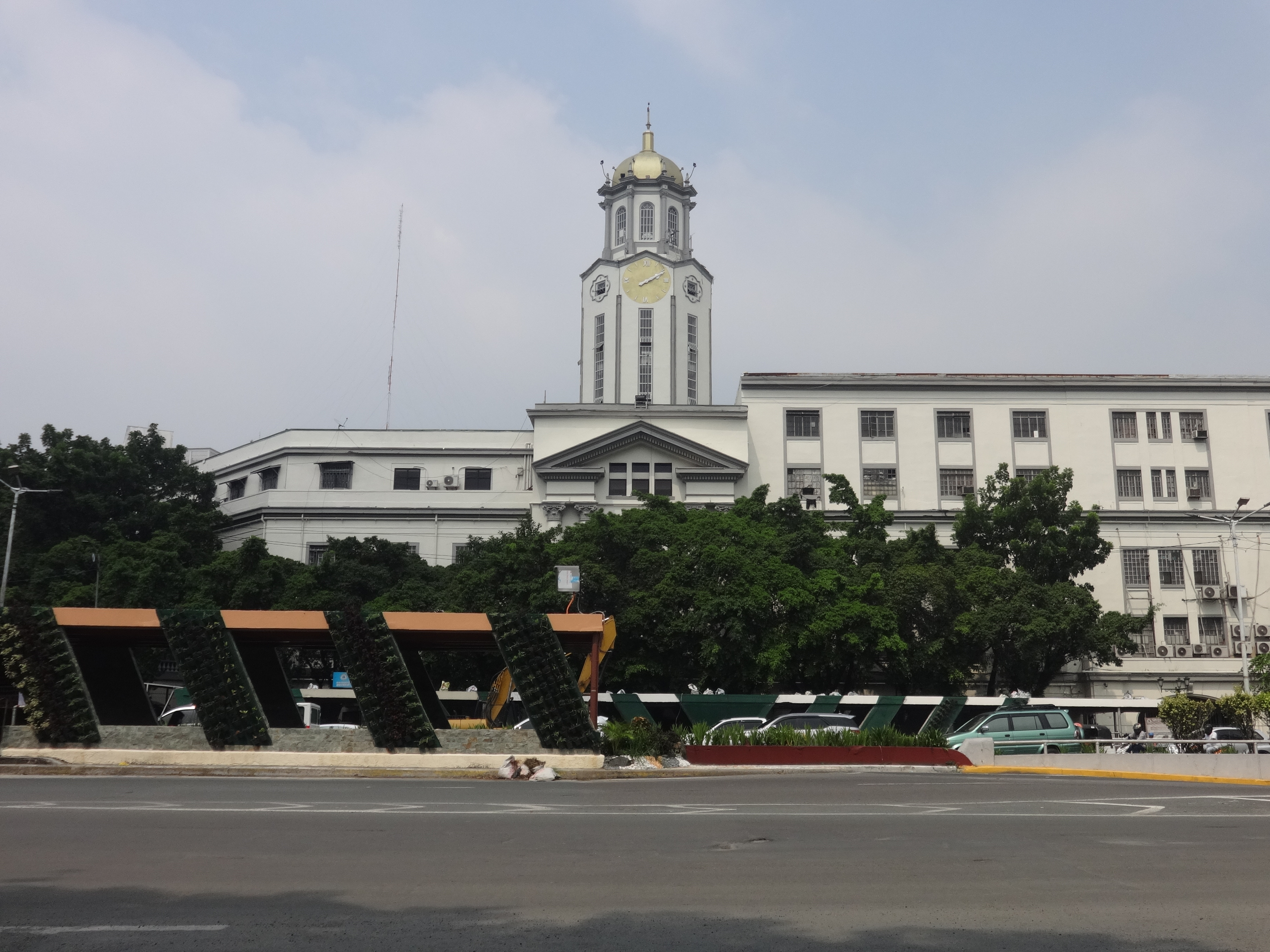
Manila City Hall, the seat of city government

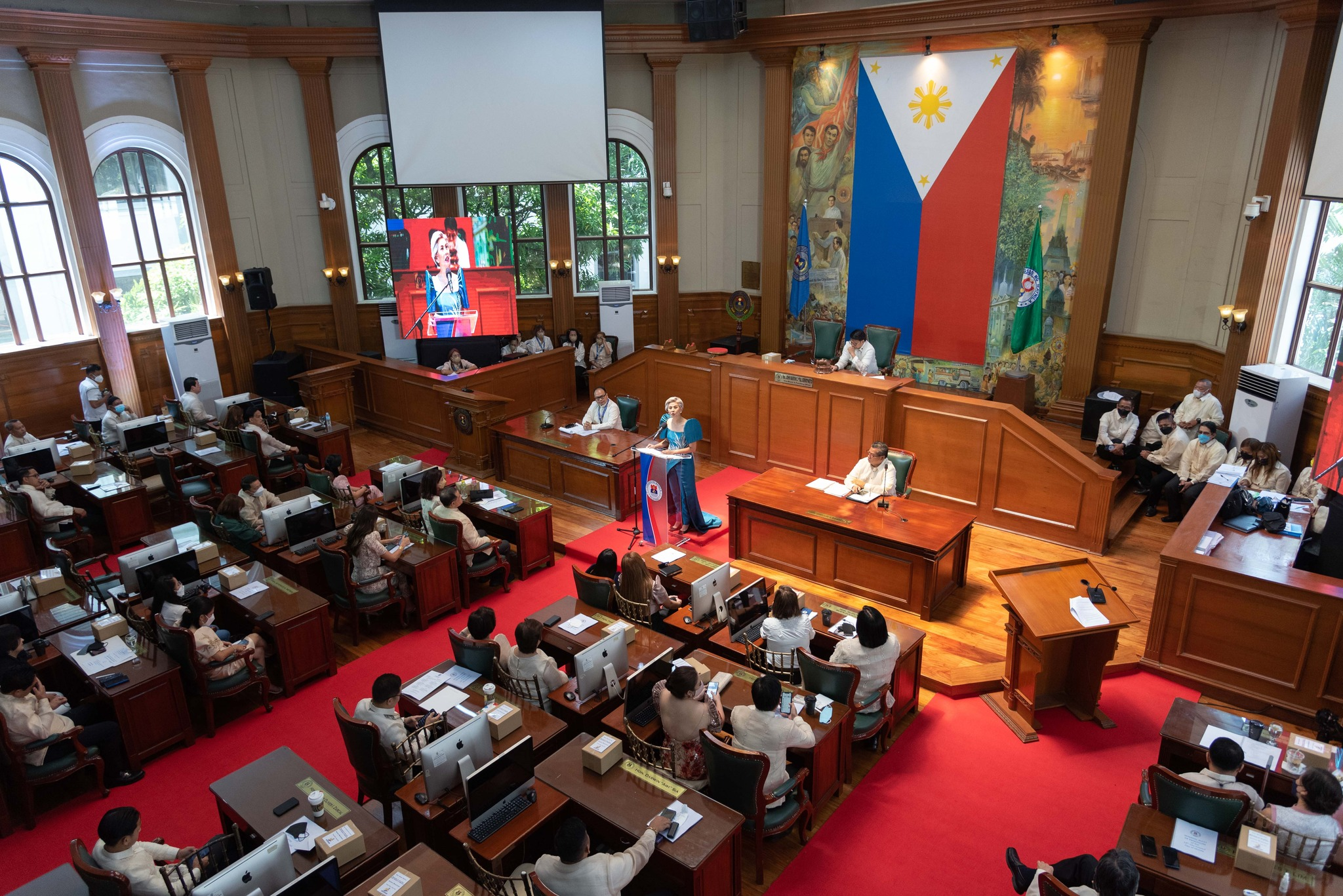
The inaugural session of the 12th Manila City Council at the city hall, 2022

Manila, which is officially known as the City of Manila, is the national capital of the Philippines and is classified as a special city according to its income, and a highly urbanized city (HUC). The Mayor of Manila is the chief executive, and is assisted by the vice mayor and the 38-member City Council, who are elected as representatives of the six councilor districts within the city, and the municipal presidents of the Liga ng mga Barangay and Sangguniang Kabataan.

The city has no control over Intramuros and Manila North Harbor. The historic Walled City is administered by the Intramuros Administration while Manila North Harbor is managed by the Philippine Ports Authority. Both are national government agencies. The barangays that have jurisdictions over these places oversee the welfare of the city's constituents but cannot exercise their executive powers. Manila had a 12,971 personnel complement at the end of 2018. Under the proposed form of federalism in the Philippines, Manila may no longer be the capital and Metro Manila may no longer be the seat of government; the committee has not yet decided on the federal capital and states they are open to other proposals.

As of June 2025, the mayor is Isko Moreno, who is on his second mayoral stint. The vice mayor is Chi Atienza, daughter of former mayor Lito Atienza. The mayor and the vice mayor are limited to up-to three terms, each term lasting for three years. The city has an ordinance penalizing cat-calling since 2018, and is the second city in the Philippines to do so after Quezon City, which passed a similar ordinance in 2016. In 2017, the city government planned to revise the existing curfew ordinance since the Supreme Court declared it unconstitutional in August that year. Of the three cities reviewed by the Supreme Court; the City of Manila, Navotas, and Quezon City; only the curfew ordinance of Quezon City was approved.

=== National government ===
Malacañang Palace, the official residence and workplace of the President of the Philippines.

The Palacio del Gobernador in Intramuros is home to the Philippine Commission on Elections and Intramuros Administration.

Manila, being the seat of political power in the Philippines, has the headquarters of several national government offices. Planning for the city's role as the center of government started during the early years of American colonization, when the U.S. envisioned a well-designed city outside the walls of Intramuros, and chose Bagumbayan, a former town that is now Jose Rizal Park to become the center of government. A design commission was given to Daniel Burnham to create a master plan for the city patterned after Washington, D.C. but the plans were abandoned under the Commonwealth Government of Manuel L. Quezon.

A new government center was to be built on the hills northeast of Manila, in what is now Quezon City. Several government agencies have set up their headquarters in Quezon City. Several key government offices are still based in Manila. Many of the plans were substantially altered after the devastation of Manila during World War II and by subsequent administrations.

As the nation's capital, Manila hosts the Office of the President and the President's official residence. It also houses important government agencies and institutions such as the Supreme Court, the Court of Appeals, the Bangko Sentral ng Pilipinas, the Departments of Budget and Management, Finance, Health, Justice, Labor and Employment, and Public Works and Highways. Manila also hosts important national institutions such as the National Library, National Archives, National Museum of the Philippines, and Philippine General Hospital. Other notable institutions based in Manila are the National Commission for Culture and the Arts, National Historical Commission, Film Development Council of the Philippines, and the Cultural Center of the Philippines.

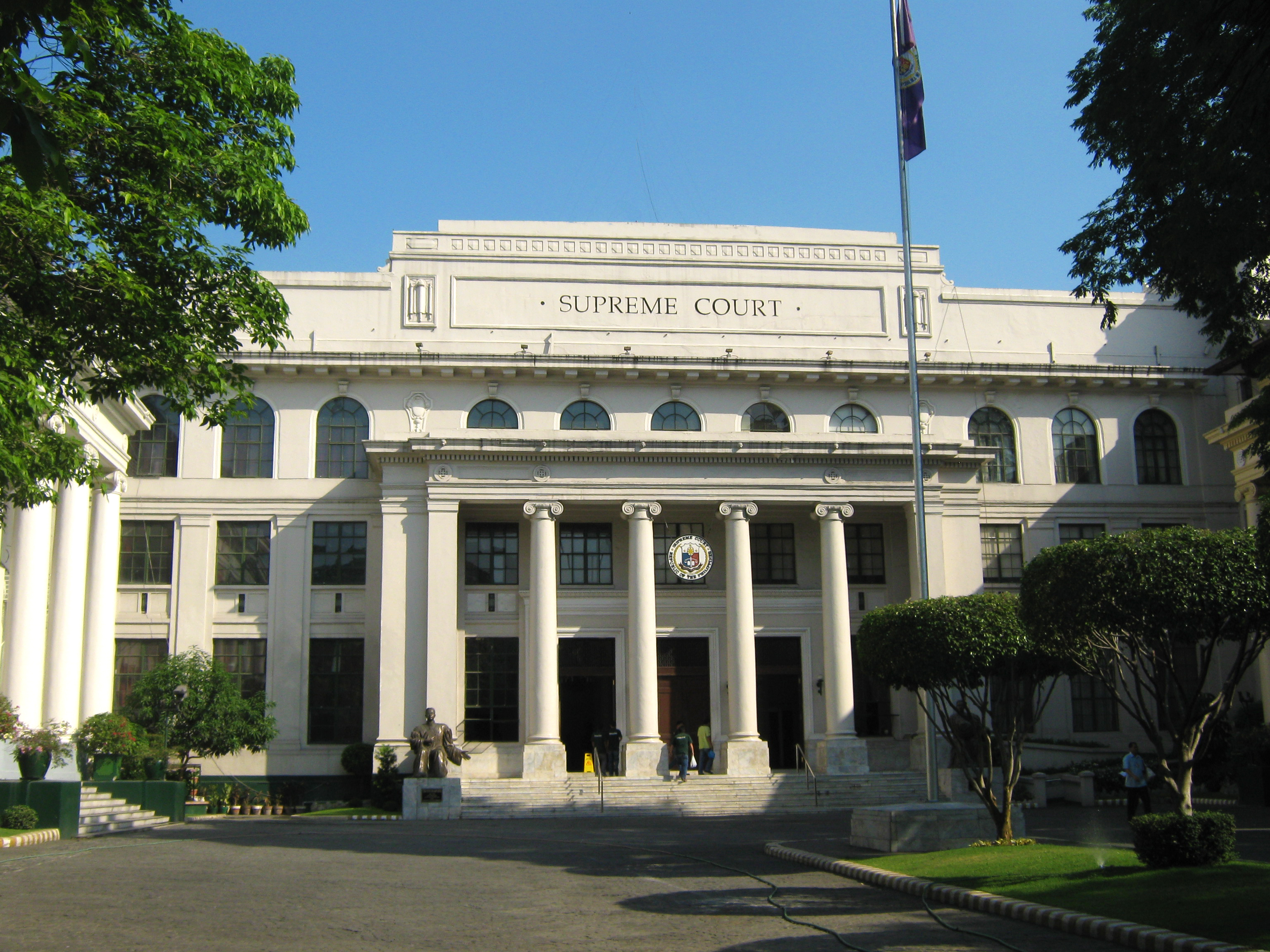
The facade of the Supreme Court of the Philippines.

Congress previously held office at the Old Congress Building. In 1972, due to declaration of martial law, Congress was dissolved; its successor, the unicameral Batasang Pambansa, held office at the new Batasang Pambansa Complex. When a new constitution restored the bicameral Congress, the House of Representatives stayed at the Batasang Pambansa Complex and the Senate remained at the Old Congress Building. In May 1997, the Senate transferred to a new building, which it shares with the Government Service Insurance System on reclaimed land at Pasay. The Supreme Court was due to transfer to its new campus at Bonifacio Global City, Taguig, in 2019 but the move was postponed to a later year.

In Congress, Manila has six representatives, one each from its six congressional districts.

=== Finance ===
In the 2019 Annual Audit Report published by the Commission on Audit, the revenue of the City of Manila was ₱16.534 billion. It is one of the cities with the highest tax collection and internal revenue allotment. For the 2019 fiscal year, the tax revenue collected by the city was ₱8.4 billion. The city's Internal Revenue Allotment (IRA) from the National Treasury was ₱2.94 billion, and the city's total assets were worth ₱63.4 billion in 2019. The City of Manila has the highest budget allocation for healthcare of all the cities and municipalities in the Philippines; the city maintains the six district hospitals, 59 health centers and lying-in clinics, and healthcare programs.

== Infrastructure ==
=== Housing ===
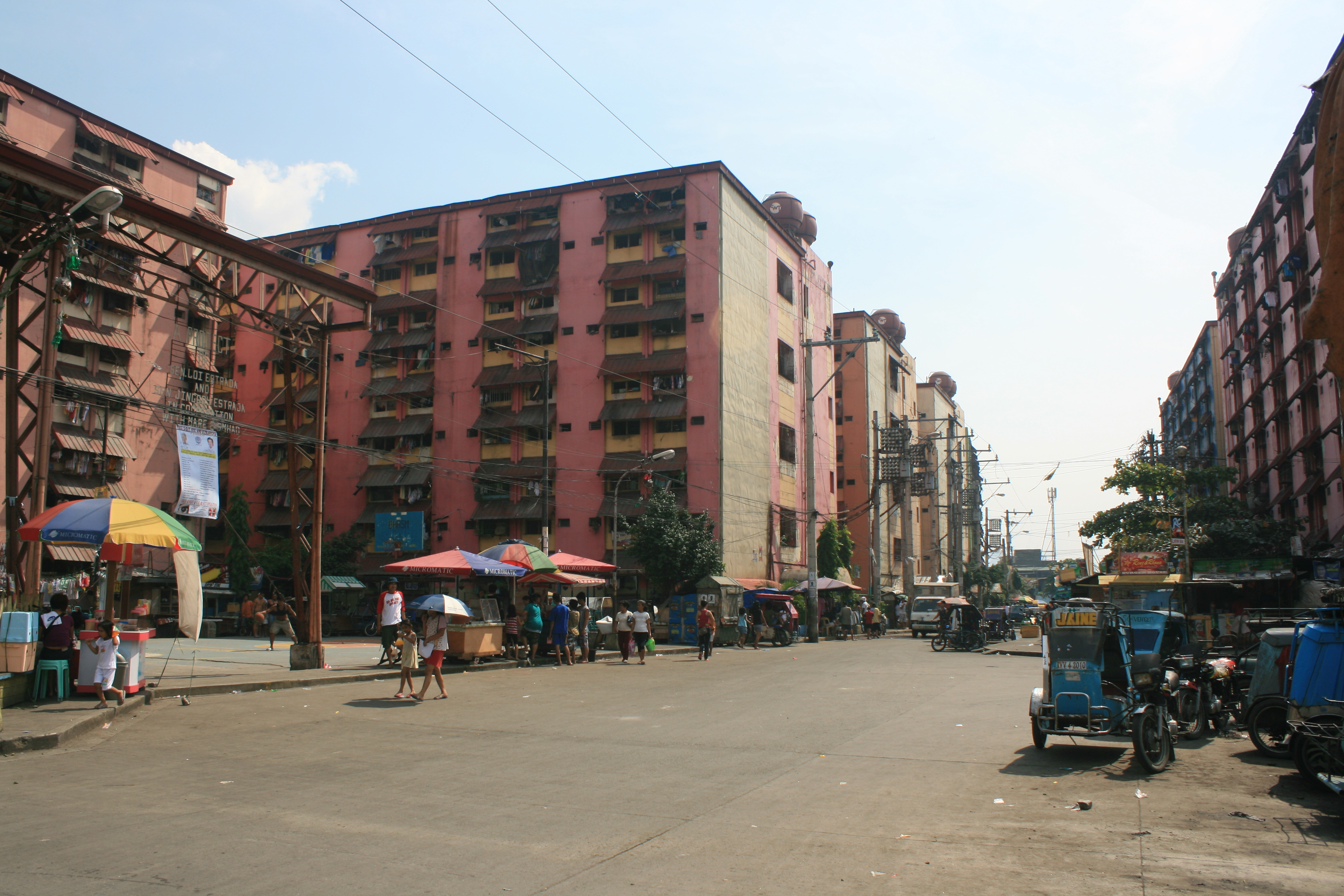
Smokey Mountain Housing Project was built on a former landfill. Continuous development of housing buildings continues up to the present day.

Development of public housing in Manila began in the 1930s under U.S. rule. Americans had to deal with the problem of sanitation and concentration of settlers around business areas. Business codes and sanitation laws were implemented in the 1930s. During this period until the 1950s, new communities were opened for relocation. Among these were Projects 1–8 in Quezon City and the Vitas tenement houses in Tondo. In 1947, the government implemented a public housing policy that established the People's Homesite and Housing Corporation (PHHC). A few years later, it established a Slum Clearance Committee which, with the help of the PHHC, relocated thousands of families from Manila and Quezon City to Sapang Palay in San Jose del Monte, Bulacan in the 1960s.

In 2016, the national government completed several medium-rise houses for 300 Manila residents whose slum community was destroyed by a fire in 2011. As of 2019, the city government plans to retrofit dilapidated tenements within the city, and will construct new housing buildings for the city's informal settlers such as the 14-story Tondominium 1 and Tondomium 2 buildings, containing 42-square-meter (450 sq ft), two-bedroom units. The construction of these new in-city vertical housing projects was funded by a loan from the Development Bank of the Philippines and the Land Bank of the Philippines.

Since 2019, the Manila City Government has initiated six housing projects: Tondominium 1 & 2, Binondominium, Basecommunity, San Lazaro Residences, Pedro Gil Residences, and San Sebastian Residences.

=== Transportation ===
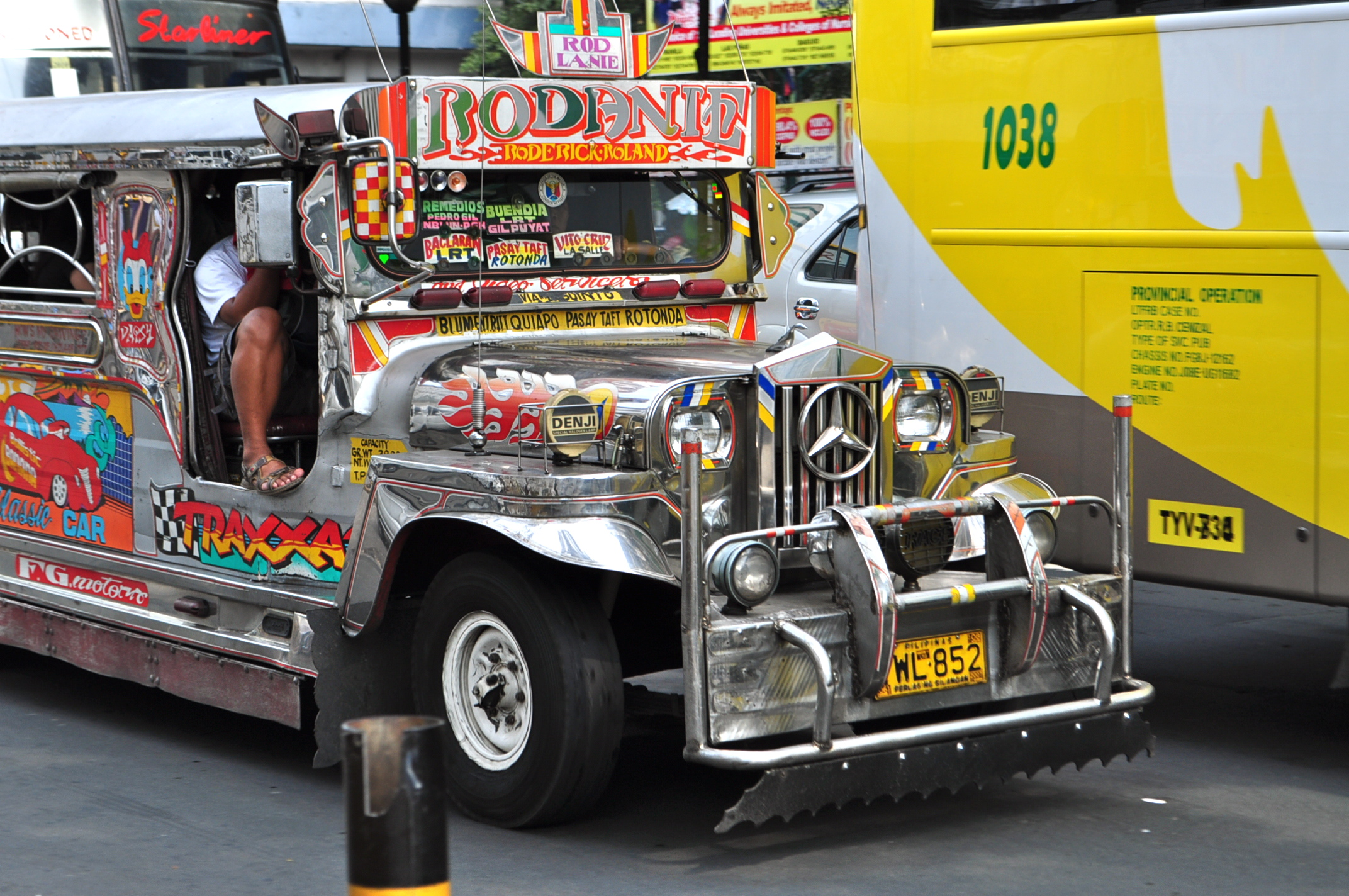
Jeepneys are one of the most popular modes of transportation in Manila.

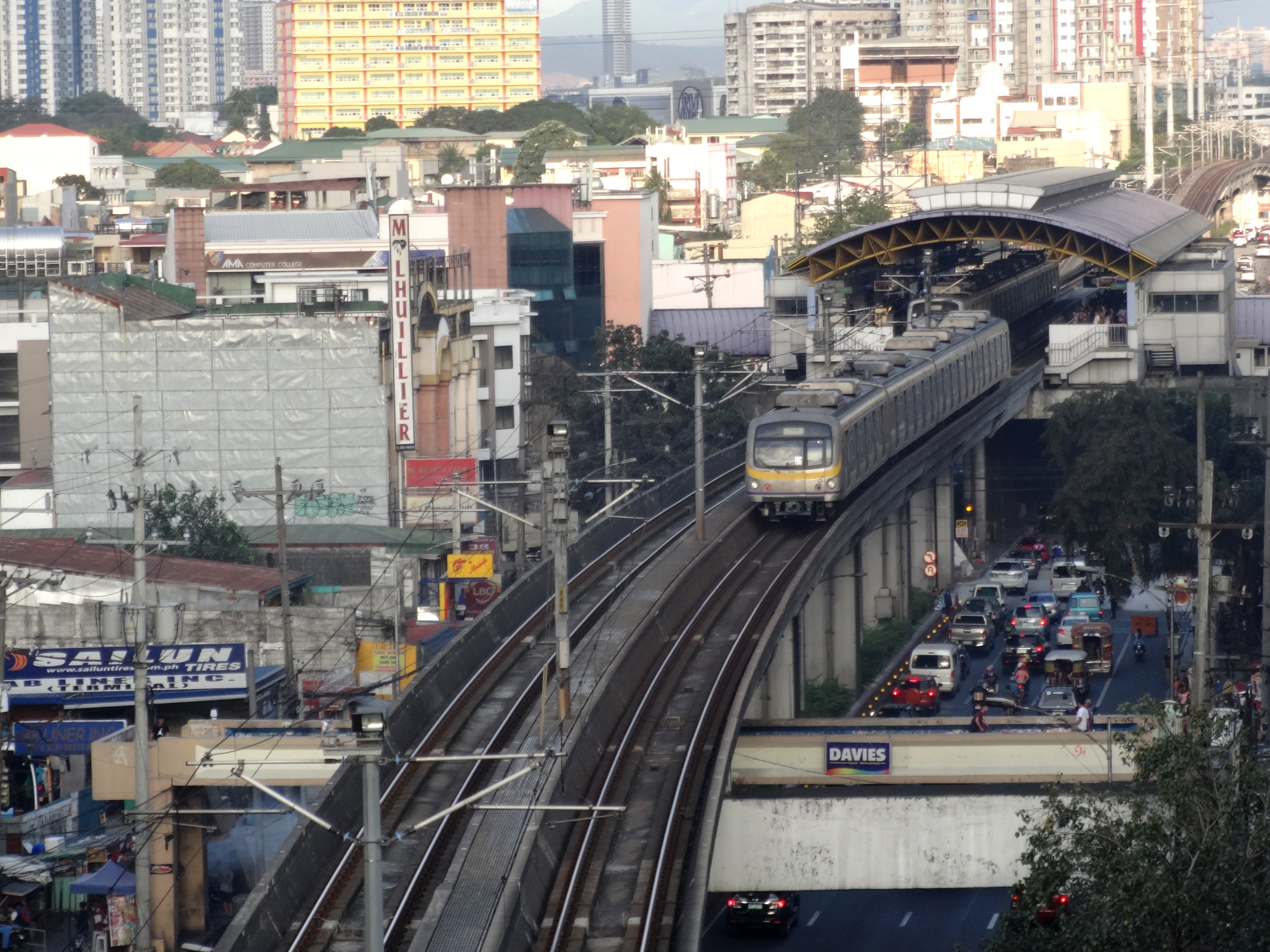
Pureza station of LRT Line 2 in Santa Mesa

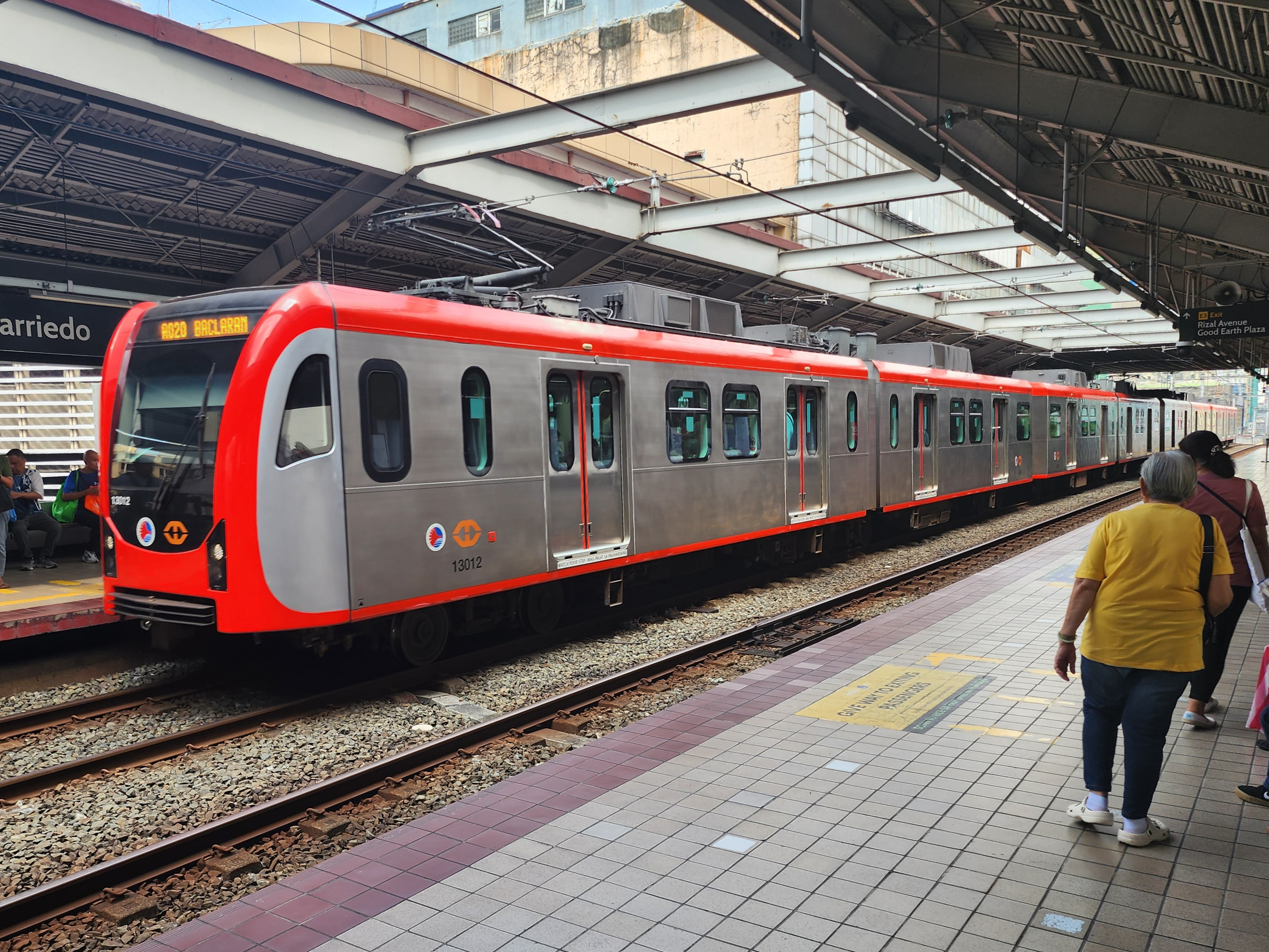
Carriedo station of the LRT Line 1

One of the best-known modes of transportation in Manila is the jeepney, which were patterned after U.S. Army jeeps and have been in use since the mid-to-late 1940s. The Tamaraw FX, the third generation of the Toyota Kijang, once directly competed with jeepneys and followed fixed routes for a set price. They were replaced by the UV Express. All types of public road transportation in Manila are privately owned and operated under government-issued franchises.

On a for-hire basis, the city is served by taxicabs, "tricycles" – motorcycles with sidecars—the Philippine version of the auto rickshaw, and "trisikads", "sikads" or "kuligligs"; bicycles with sidecars, the Philippine version of pedicabs, which are popular in some areas, especially Divisoria. Spanish-era horse-drawn calesas are a popular tourist attraction and mode of transportation in Binondo and Intramuros. Manila will phase out all gasoline-run tricycles and pedicabs, and replace them with electric tricycles (e-trikes), and plans to distribute 10,000 e-trikes to qualified tricycle drivers from the city. By January 2018, the city has distributed e-trikes to a number of drivers and operators in Binondo, Ermita, Malate, and Santa Cruz.

Manila is serviced by LRT Line 1 (LRT-1) and Line 2 (LRT-2), which form the Manila Light Rail Transit System. Development of the light rail system began in the 1970s during the presidency of Ferdinand Marcos, when the LRT Line 1 was built, making it the first light-rail system in Southeast Asia. Despite its name, LRT-1 operates as a light metro, running on dedicated rights-of-way. LRT 2 operates as a full-metro, heavy rail system. As of 2015, these systems were undergoing a multi-billion-dollar expansion. The LRT runs along the length of Taft Avenue (N170/R-2) and Rizal Avenue (N150/R-9), while LRT-2 runs along Claro M. Recto Avenue (N145/C-1) and Ramon Magsaysay Boulevard (N180/R-6) from Santa Cruz, through Quezon City, and to Masinag in Antipolo, Rizal.

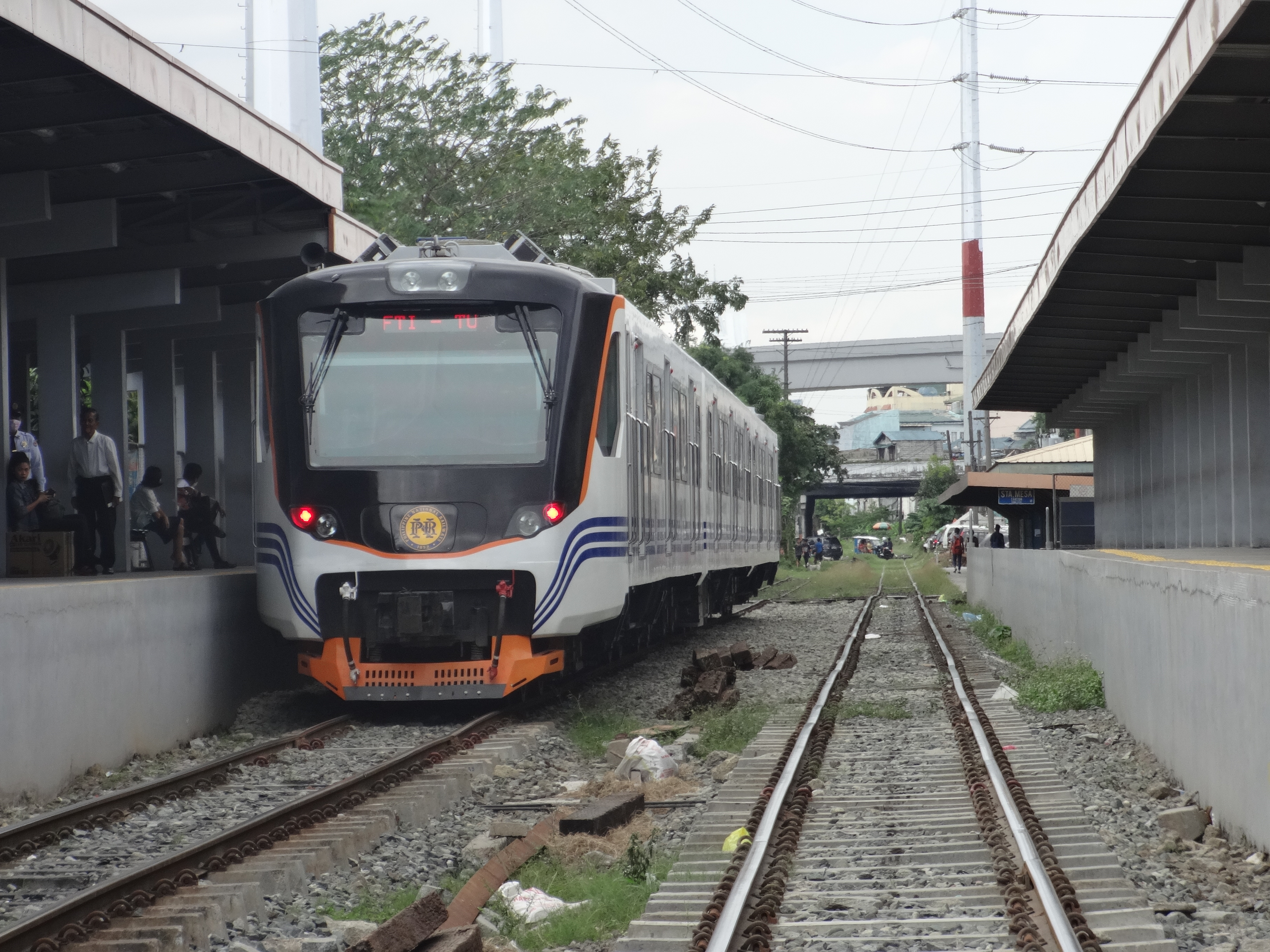
A PNR 8000 class at Santa Mesa station, the fourth station southbound from Tutuban station terminus.

Tutuban station, the central terminal of the Philippine National Railways, lies within Manila. Within Metro Manila, one commuter railway is in operation. The line runs in a general north–south direction from Tutuban (Tondo) toward the province of Laguna. The Port of Manila, which is located in the western section of the city on Manila Bay, is the largest and chief seaport of the Philippines. The Pasig River Ferry Service is another form of transportation. The city is also served by Ninoy Aquino International Airport, the country's main international airport and domestic air hub.

Trolleys, hand-made human-powered metal handcarts operated by "trolley boys", transport people along sections of the PNR lines. This is a popular means of transportation because it is low-cost – roughly ₱10 or US$.20 per trip – and avoids traffic. Many trolley boys are homeless and live alongside the railroad line, which is actively used by passenger trains, making collisions with passenger trains a consistent danger, although casualties are rare. The trolley rides are unofficial and unregulated but tolerated by authorities.

Satellite navigation company TomTom ranked Manila as the second world's most-traffic-congested city in 2019. According to Waze's 2015 "Global Driver Satisfaction Index", Manila has the worst traffic worldwide. Manila is notorious for its frequent traffic jams and high densities. The government has undertaken several projects to alleviate the traffic in the city, some of which include the proposed construction of a new viaduct or underpass at the intersection of España Boulevard and Lacson Avenue; the construction of Skyway Stage 3, and NLEX Connector; the proposed LRT Line 2 West Extension Project from Recto Avenue to Pier 4 of Manila North Harbor; the construction of the North–South Commuter Railway (NSCR); the proposed construction of the PNR East–West line (MRT Line 8) through España Boulevard to Quezon City; and the expansion and widening of several national and local roads. These projects had yet to make any meaningful impact by 2014, and the traffic jams and congestion continue.

The government, under its 2014 Metro Manila Dream Plan aims to address these urban transport problems. The plan is a list of short-term priority projects and medium-to-long-term infrastructure projects that will last up to 2030.

=== Water and electricity ===
Water services used to be provided by the Metropolitan Waterworks and Sewerage System (MWSS), which served 30% of the city. Most other sewage was directly dumped into storm drains, septic tanks, and open canals. MWSS was privatized in 1997, which split the water concession into east and west zones. Maynilad Water Services took over the west zone, of which Manila is a part.

As of 2001, Maynilad Water Services provides the supply and delivery of potable water, and sewerage system in Manila. The southeastern part of the city, which belongs to the east zone, is served by Manila Water. Electricity services are provided by Meralco, the sole electricity distributor in Metro Manila.

== Healthcare ==
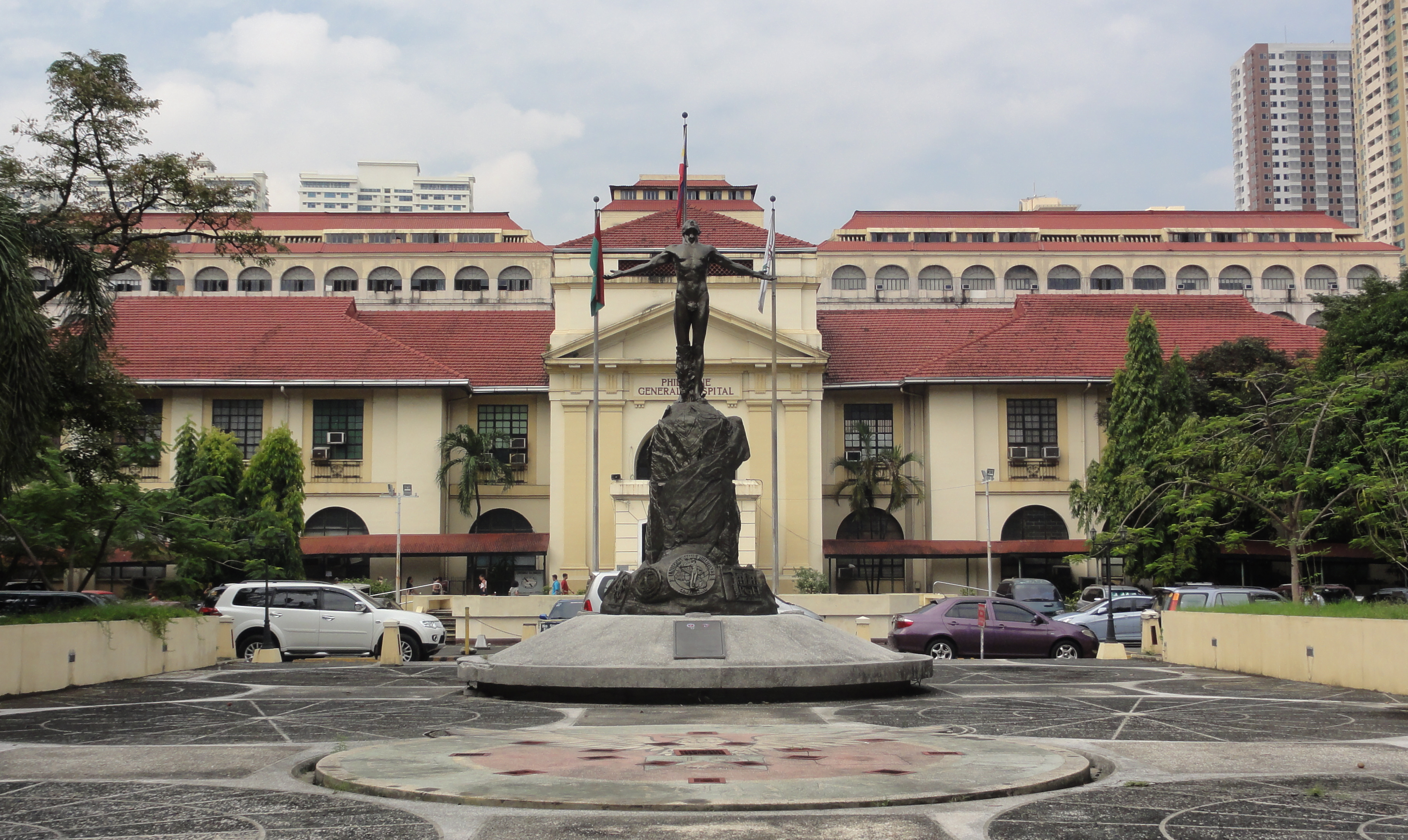
Philippine General Hospital, established in 1910, is the largest modern tertiary hospital in the country.

Manila Health Department is responsible for the planning and implementation of healthcare programs provided by the city government. Manila Health Department operates 59 health centers and six city-run hospitals, which are free of charge for the city's constituents. The six public city-run hospitals are Ospital ng Maynila Medical Center, Ospital ng Sampaloc, Gat Andres Bonifacio Memorial Medical Center, Ospital ng Tondo, Santa Ana Hospital, and Justice Jose Abad Santos General Hospital. Philippine General Hospital, a tertiary state-owned hospital in Manila, is operated by the University of the Philippines Manila. The city is planning to build an education, research, and hospital facility for cleft lip and cleft palate patients, and to establish the first children's surgical hospital in Southeast Asia.

Private corporations also provide healthcare in Manila. Private hospitals that operate in the city are Manila Doctors Hospital, Chinese General Hospital and Medical Center, José R. Reyes Memorial Medical Center, Metropolitan Medical Center, Our Lady of Lourdes Hospital, and the University of Santo Tomas Hospital.

The Department of Health (DOH) has its main office in Manila and operates San Lazaro Hospital, a special referral tertiary hospital. DOH also operates Dr. Jose Fabella Memorial Hospital, Jose R. Reyes Memorial Medical Center, and Tondo Medical Center. Manila is the home to the headquarters of the World Health Organization's Regional Office for the Western Pacific and Country Office for the Philippines.

The city government provides free immunization programs for children, who are specifically targeted against hepatitis B, hemophilus influenza B pneumonia, diphtheria, tetanus, polio, measles, mumps, and rubella. As of 2016, 31,115 children aged one and below have been fully immunized. Manila Dialysis Center, which provides free services for the poor, has been cited by the United Nations Committee on Innovation, Competitiveness and Public-Private Partnerships as a model for public-private partnership (PPP) projects. The dialysis facility was named Flora V. Valisno de Siojo Dialysis Center in 2019, and was inaugurated as the largest free dialysis facility in the Philippines. It has 91 dialysis machines, which can be expanded up to 100, matching the capabilities of the National Kidney and Transplant Institute (NKTI).

== Education ==
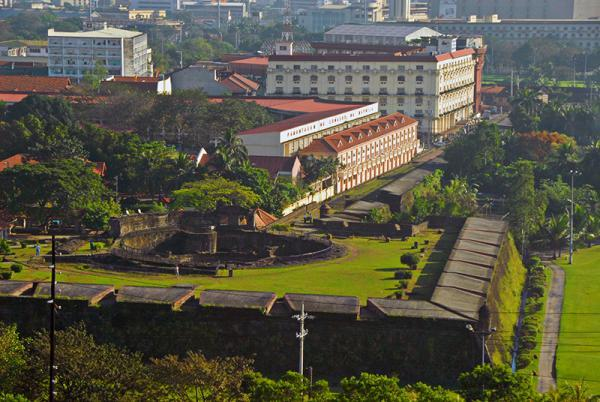
The campus of the Pamantasan ng Lungsod ng Maynila and Baluarte de San Diego in Intramuros

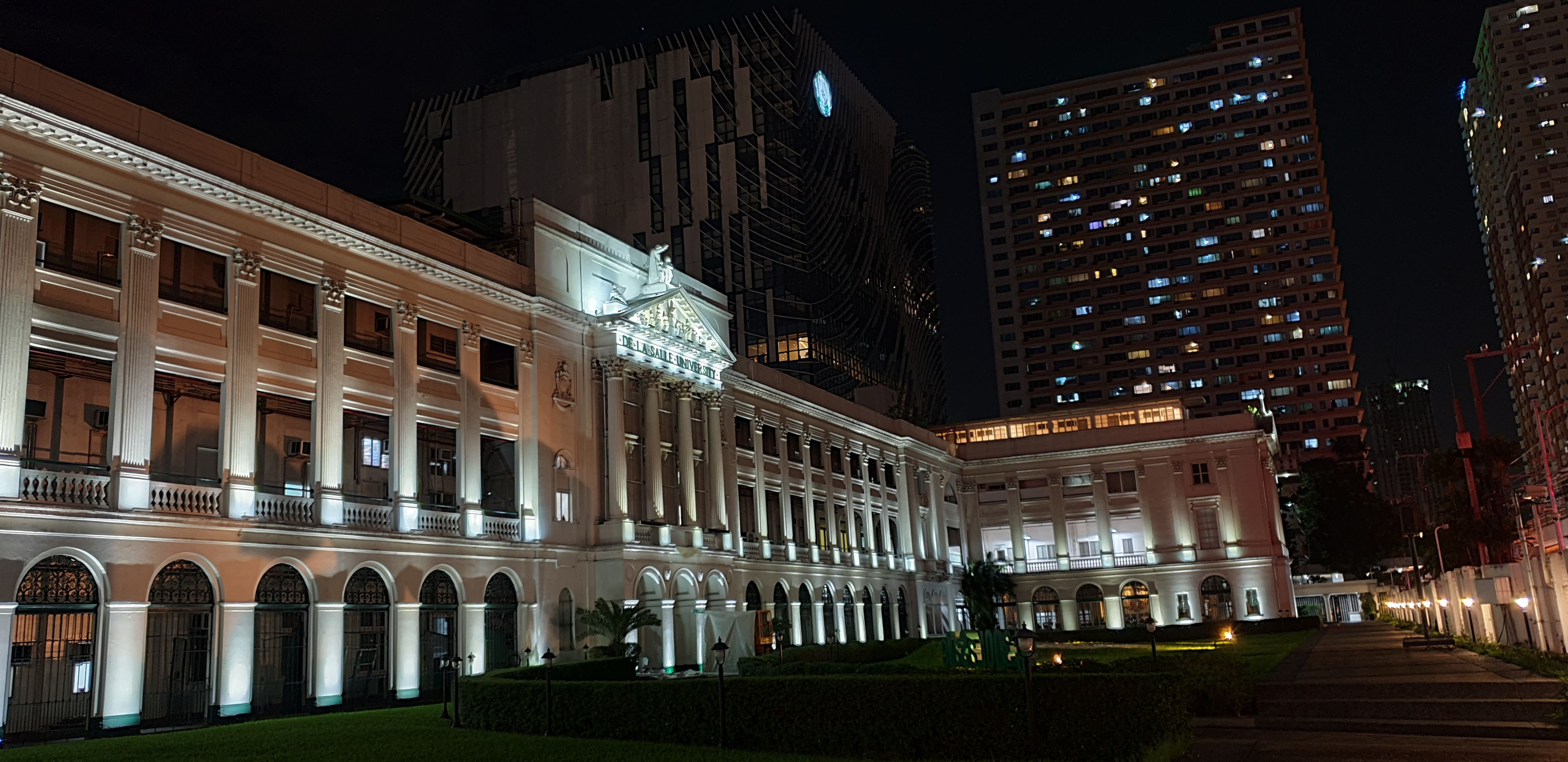
De La Salle University is a Lasallian educational institution established in 1911.

Manila has been a center of education since the colonial period. The city has several Philippine universities and colleges, some of which are the county's oldest. The city's University Belt has a high concentration of colleges and universities, which are a short walking distance of each other. The University Belt is at the boundaries between San Miguel, Quiapo, and Sampaloc districts, while other clusters colleges lie along the southern bank of the Pasig River – mostly in Intramuros and Ermita districts; and at the southernmost part of Malate near the city limits.

The historic district Intramuros once housed the University of Santo Tomas (1611), Colegio de San Juan de Letran (1620), and Ateneo de Manila University (1859). Only Colegio de San Juan de Letran remains at Intramuros; the University of Santo Tomas transferred to a new campus at Sampaloc in 1927 and Ateneo de Manila University relocated to Loyola Heights, Quezon City, in 1952. In the 20th century, new non-sectarian schools were built; Mapúa University (1925), Lyceum of the Philippines University (1952), and Pamantasan ng Lungsod ng Maynila (1965) – which is owned and operated by the Manila city government. The four schools in the district formed the Intramuros Consortium.

Other notable universities in Manila include National University (1900), San Beda University (1901), the only Benedictine university in Asia, De La Salle University (1911), the largest of all De La Salle University System of schools, St. Paul University Manila (1912), one of the seven campuses comprising the St. Paul University System of schools, Far Eastern University (1928), and Adamson University (1939).

The University of the Philippines (1908), the country's main state university, was established in Ermita, Manila. It moved its central administrative offices from Manila to Diliman in 1949 and eventually made the original campus the University of the Philippines Manila, the oldest of the constituent universities of the University of the Philippines System, and the center of health-sciences education in the country. Manila is also the site of the main campus of the Polytechnic University of the Philippines, the largest university in the country in terms of student population.

The city's three-tier public education system, the Division of the City Schools of Manila, is a branch of the Department of Education. The division oversees 71 public elementary schools and 32 public high schools, all located within the city's territory, except for Rafael Palma Elementary School, which is situated in Barangay La Paz, Makati, near the border with Manila. The city also contains Manila Science High School, a pilot science high school.

== Sister cities ==
=== Asia ===
- Astana, Kazakhstan
- Bacoor, Cavite
- Bangkok, Thailand
- Beijing, People's Republic of China
- Dili, East Timor
- Guangzhou, Guangdong, People's Republic of China
- Haifa, Israel
- Ho Chi Minh City, Vietnam
- Incheon, South Korea
- Jakarta, Indonesia
- Nantan, Kyoto, Japan
- Osaka, Japan (business partner)
- Shanghai, People's Republic of China
- Taipei, Taiwan
- Takatsuki, Osaka, Japan
- Yokohama, Kanagawa, Japan

=== Europe ===
- Bucharest, Romania
- Lisbon, Portugal
- Warsaw, Poland
- Madrid, Spain
- Málaga, Spain
- Moscow, Russia
- Nice, France

=== The Americas ===
- Acapulco, Guerrero, Mexico
- Buenos Aires, Argentina
- Cali, Colombia
- Cartagena, Colombia
- Havana, Cuba
- Lima, Peru
- Mexico City, Mexico
- Montevideo, Uruguay
- Montreal, Quebec, Canada
- New York City, New York, United States (global partner)
- Panama City, Panama
- Sacramento, California, United States
- San Francisco, California, United States
- Santiago, Chile
- Winnipeg, Manitoba, Canada

=== Oceania ===
- Honolulu, Hawaii, United States
- Maui County, Hawaii, United States
- Saipan, Northern Mariana Islands

== International relations ==
Manila hosts the foreign embassies of the United States and Vietnam. Honorary consulates of Belize, Burkina Faso, Jordan, Nepal, Poland, Iceland, Paraguay, Thailand, and Tunisia are based in the city.

== See also ==
- Greater Manila Area
- Province of Manila

== Notes ==
| Preceded by Iloilo City | Capital of the Spanish East Indies; 1571–1762 | Succeeded by Bacolor |
| Preceded by Bacolor | Capital of the Spanish East Indies; 1764–1896 | Succeeded by Iloilo City |
| Independence declared | Capital of the Philippines; 1898–1941 | Succeeded by Corregidor Island as Capital of the Commonwealth of the Philippines |
| Independence declared | Capital of the Philippines; 1898–1941 | Succeeded by City of Greater Manila as Capital of the Second Philippine Republic |
| Preceded by Baguio (Japan) Nara/Tokyo as Capital of the Second Philippine Republic | Capital of the Philippines; 1945–1948 | Succeeded by Quezon City |
| Preceded by Quezon City | Capital of the Philippines; 1976–present | Incumbent |
| Province established | Capital of Manila; 1571–1898 | Succeeded by Mariquina |
| Preceded by Mariquina | Capital of Manila; 1899–1901 | Province abolished |
