= 2GO Travel =

Ferry operator in the Philippines

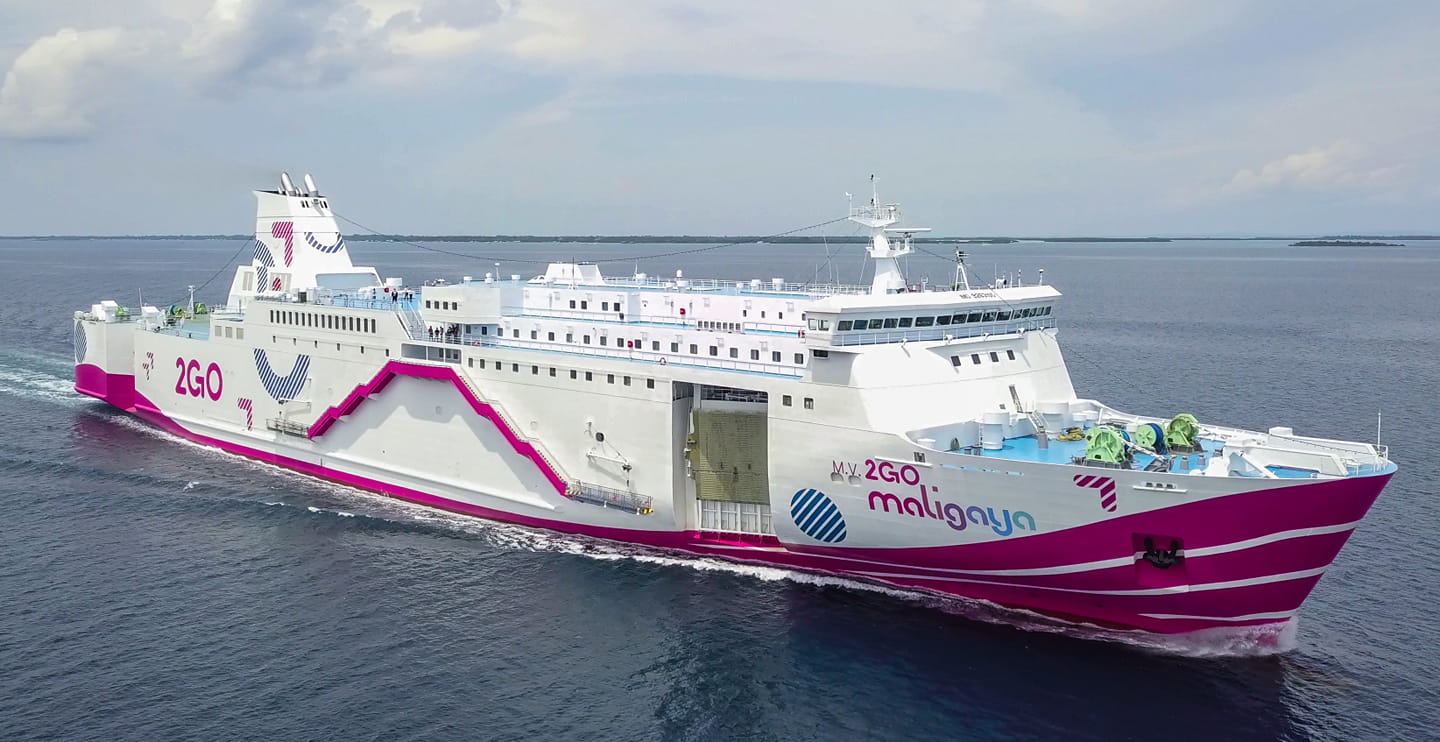
- Industry: Transport
- Predecessor: SuperFerry; Negros Navigation; Cebu Ferries
- Founded: January 1, 2012; 14 years ago in Manila, Philippines
- Headquarters: 8F Tower 1 Double Dragon Plaza, Macapagal Blvd. cor. EDSA Ext., Pasay 1302 Philippines
- Area served: Philippines
- Key people: Frederic C. DyBuncio (Chairman, President & CEO); Elmer B. Serrano (Corporate Secretary and Corporate Information Officer)
- Parent: 2GO Group
- Website: 2go.com.ph/travel travel.2go.com.ph

2GO Travel
- Transit type: Inter-Island Ferry
- Operator: 2GO Sea Solutions
- No. of vessels: 9
- Hubs: Pier 4, Manila North Harbor; Batangas International Port
- No. of terminals: 20

2GO Travel (or simply branded as 2GO) is the passenger ferry business unit under the Sea Solutions division of 2GO Group Inc., a Philippine-based logistics and transportation company, and one of the only remaining passenger-cargo ferry operators providing services to and from Manila to the Visayas and Mindanao. Its main hubs are located at Pier 4 in the Manila North Harbor and the Batangas International Port. It has one of the more modern shipping fleets in the Philippines and operates a fleet of large inter-island vessels in the country, which As of October 2026 consists of 9 operating vessels.

2GO Travel was formed in 2012 after the merger of the Aboitiz Transport System brands (SuperFerry, Cebu Ferries, and SuperCat) and the passenger division of Negros Navigation, which made it the second largest merger in Philippine shipping history after the William, Gothong and Aboitiz (WG&A) merger in 1996.

== Destinations and routes ==
=== Destinations ===
This is a list of destinations that 2GO Travel has served As of October 2026, consisting of destinations across Luzon, Visayas and Mindanao.

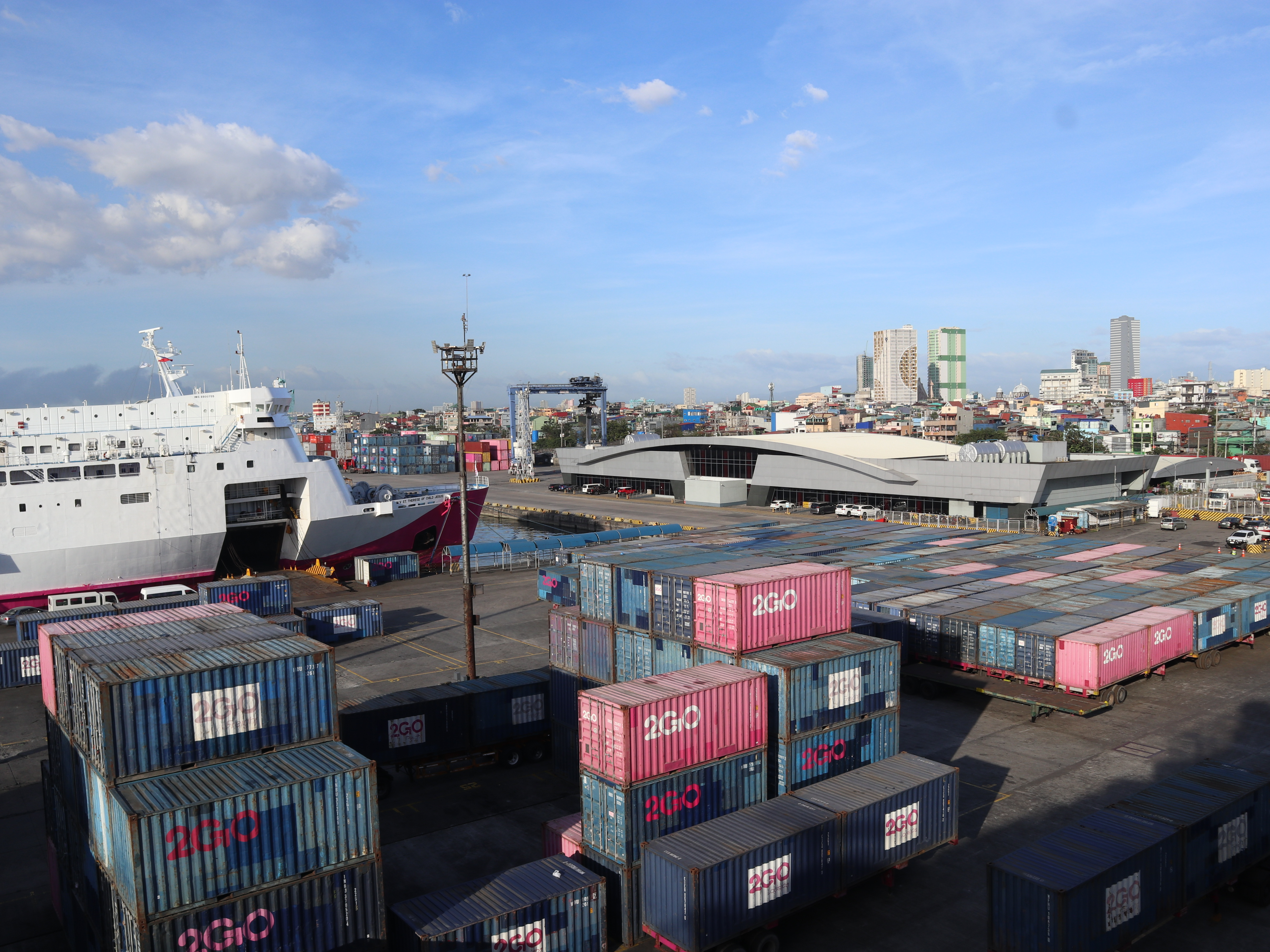
2GO's Main Hub at Pier 4, Manila North Harbor.

M/V 2GO Masagana passes beneath the Cebu–Cordova Link Expressway in Cebu City. Cebu is one of 2GO’s key routes.

Region	Province	Destination	Port	Port Code	Status
Luzon	Calabarzon	Batangas	Batangas International Port	PHBTG	Hub
Luzon	Palawan	Coron	Coron Port	PHXCN	
Luzon	Palawan	Puerto Princesa	Port of Puerto Princesa	PHPPS	
Luzon	National Capital Region	Manila	Pier 4, Manila North Harbor	PHMNL/PHMNN	Hub
Luzon	Masbate	Masbate City	Port of Masbate	PHMBT	Suspended
Luzon	Romblon	Odiongan	Port of Poctoy	PHODI	
Luzon	Romblon	Romblon	Port of Romblon	PHROM	Suspended
Visayas	Negros Occidental	Bacolod	BREDCO Port	PHBCD	
Visayas	Aklan	Caticlan (Boracay)	Caticlan Jetty Port	PHMPH	
Visayas	Cebu	Cebu City	Pier 5, Cebu International Port	PHCEB	
Visayas	Negros Oriental	Dumaguete	Port of Dumaguete	PHDGT	
Visayas	Iloilo	Iloilo City	Fort San Pedro	PHILO	
Visayas	Leyte	Ormoc	Port of Ormoc	PHORM	Suspended
Visayas	Leyte	Tacloban	Port of Tacloban	PHTAC	Suspended
Visayas	Capiz	Roxas	Culasi Port	PHRXS	
Visayas	Bohol	Tagbilaran	Port of Tagbilaran	PHTAG	
Visayas	Bohol	Jagna	Port of Jagna	PHJAG	Suspended
Mindanao	Agusan del Norte	Butuan via Nasipit	Port of Nasipit	PHBXU/PHNAS	
Mindanao	Misamis Oriental	Cagayan de Oro	Port of Cagayan de Oro	PHCGY	
Mindanao	Davao del Sur	Davao City	Sasa Wharf	PHDVO	
Mindanao	Zamboanga del Norte	Dipolog via Dapitan	Pulauan Port	PHDPL	
Mindanao	South Cotabato	General Santos	Makar Wharf	PHGES	
Mindanao	Lanao del Norte	Iligan	Port of Iligan	PHILI	Suspended
Mindanao	Misamis Occidental	Ozamiz	Port of Ozamiz	PHOZC	
Mindanao	Surigao del Norte	Surigao City	Port of Surigao	PHSUG	Suspended
Mindanao	Surigao del Norte	Siargao	Jubang International Cruise Port	PHIAO	
Mindanao	Zamboanga	Zamboanga City	Port of Zamboanga	PHZAM	

Destinations maps
Legend:
- : Hubs
- : Destinations

=== Current Routes ===
The routes shown below are the ships' usual route assignments As of October 2026. The ships may be assigned to other routes when needed (such as when the original assigned vessel was on a drydock).

Route	Currently Served by	Originally Served by	Schedule
Manila - Cebu - Cagayan de Oro - Cebu - Manila	2GO Masagana	2GO Masagana	Every Sunday at 9:00 AM and Wednesday at 9:00 PM — Flagship route.
Manila - Bacolod - Iloilo - Cagayan De Oro - Iloilo - Manila	2GO Maligaya	2GO Maligaya	Every Tuesday at 12:30 PM.
Manila - Iloilo - Bacolod - Manila	2GO Maligaya	2GO Maligaya	Every Saturday at 7:00 PM.
Manila - Batangas - Cebu - Manila	2GO Masikap	2GO Masikap	Every Tuesday at 7:00 AM
Manila - Bacolod - Cagayan de Oro - Bacolod - Manila	2GO Masikap	2GO Masikap	Every Friday at 5:00 AM
Manila - Cebu - Puerto Princesa - Manila	2GO Masigla	2GO Masigla	Every Monday at 5:00 PM
Manila - Cebu - Tagbilaran - Manila	2GO Masigla	2GO Masigla	Every Friday at 2:00 PM
Manila - Davao - General Santos - Zamboanga - Iloilo - Manila	2GO Masinag	2GO Masinag	Every Wednesday at 11:00 AM.
Manila - Siargao - Butuan (Nasipit) - Ozamiz - Manila	St. Francis Xavier	St. Francis Xavier	Every Monday at 6:30 PM.
Manila - Coron - Puerto Princesa - Coron - Manila	St. Francis Xavier	St. Francis Xavier	Every Friday at 5:30 PM.
Manila - Dumaguete - Dipolog (Dapitan) - Zamboanga - Manila	St. Michael the Archangel	St. Michael the Archangel	Every Sunday at 9:30 PM.
Manila - Batangas - Iloilo - Bacolod - Manila	St. Michael the Archangel	St. Michael the Archangel	Every Thursday at 9:30 PM.
Batangas - Caticlan - Roxas - Caticlan - Batangas	St. Ignatius of Loyola; St. Augustine of Hippo	St. Ignatius of Loyola; St. Augustine of Hippo	Every Monday, Wednesday, Friday and Sunday at 9:00 PM.
Batangas - Odiongan - Caticlan - Odiongan - Batangas	St. Ignatius of Loyola; St. Augustine of Hippo	St. Ignatius of Loyola; St. Augustine of Hippo	Every Tuesday, Thursday and Saturday at 9:00 PM.

=== Unavailable Routes ===
-As of now, the following routes are unavailable and will resume as soon as possible.

Route	Originally Served by	Reason
Manila - General Santos - Davao - Cebu - Manila	2GO Masikap; 2GO Masinag	No alternation of 2GO Masikap, since 2GO Masikap served Manila-Cebu-Batangas-Manila and Manila-Bacolod-Cagayan De Oro v.v.

== Current fleet ==
- 2GO Maligaya
- 2GO Masagana
- 2GO Masikap
- 2GO Masigla
- 2GO Masinag
- St. Michael the Archangel
- St. Francis Xavier
- St. Ignatius of Loyola
- St. Augustine of Hippo

== Branding ==
=== Logo History ===
2012-2018

2012-2018 logo with stylized "TRAVEL" wording

The first logo consisted of bold, stylized text. The letter "G" was stylized to resemble an arrow. The large "2GO" was written in magenta, while the word "TRAVEL" appeared in a smaller, handwritten-style font below it, also in magenta.

2018–present

Present logo

2GO revised its logo to a much simple and cleaner design. The word "TRAVEL" is placed below the "2GO" portion in all capital letters, in a slightly smaller font but still bold and magenta.

2018–present (secondary logo)

2018 secondary logo

This secondary 2GO Travel logo is still identical to the primary logo but the "TRAVEL" text seen in the primary version is removed.

=== Livery history ===
2GO's livery has undergone many changes throughout its history. Despite differences in the design, all of their ships were predominantly painted with their company colors: white and magenta.

2012–2019

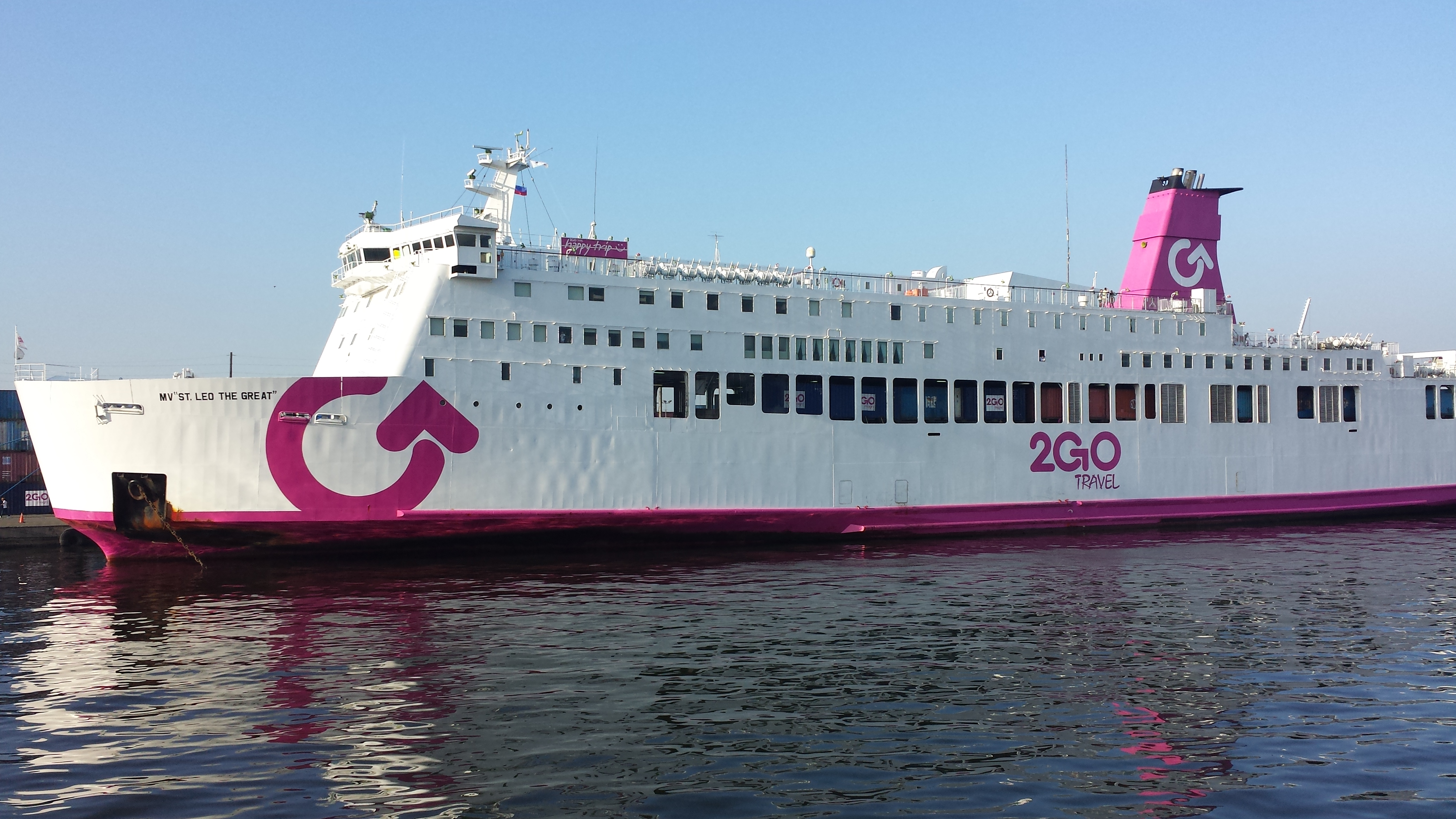
M/V "St. Leo The Great" painted on 2012-era livery

Their first livery is composed of an all-white color dominating the ship with the funnel and the waterline painted with magenta. The sides of the hull featured the "2GO Travel" branding as well as the company's signature logo, a large stylized letter "G" painted near the bow and on the funnel. The decks were painted light blue.

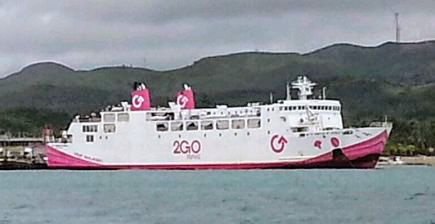
M/V "St Ignatius of Loyola" painted on the Boracay Funship livery

A special version of this livery was briefly used on one of their vessels, MV "St. Ignatius of Loyola". This special livery featured a wave-like shape on the bow and on the stern, with several shapes of birds, ball, star, and maskara and added to the bow, and the stern section featured the phrase "Sarap Maglakbay! (traveling is fun!)". It was called the Boracay Funship Livery

2019–present (S Series)

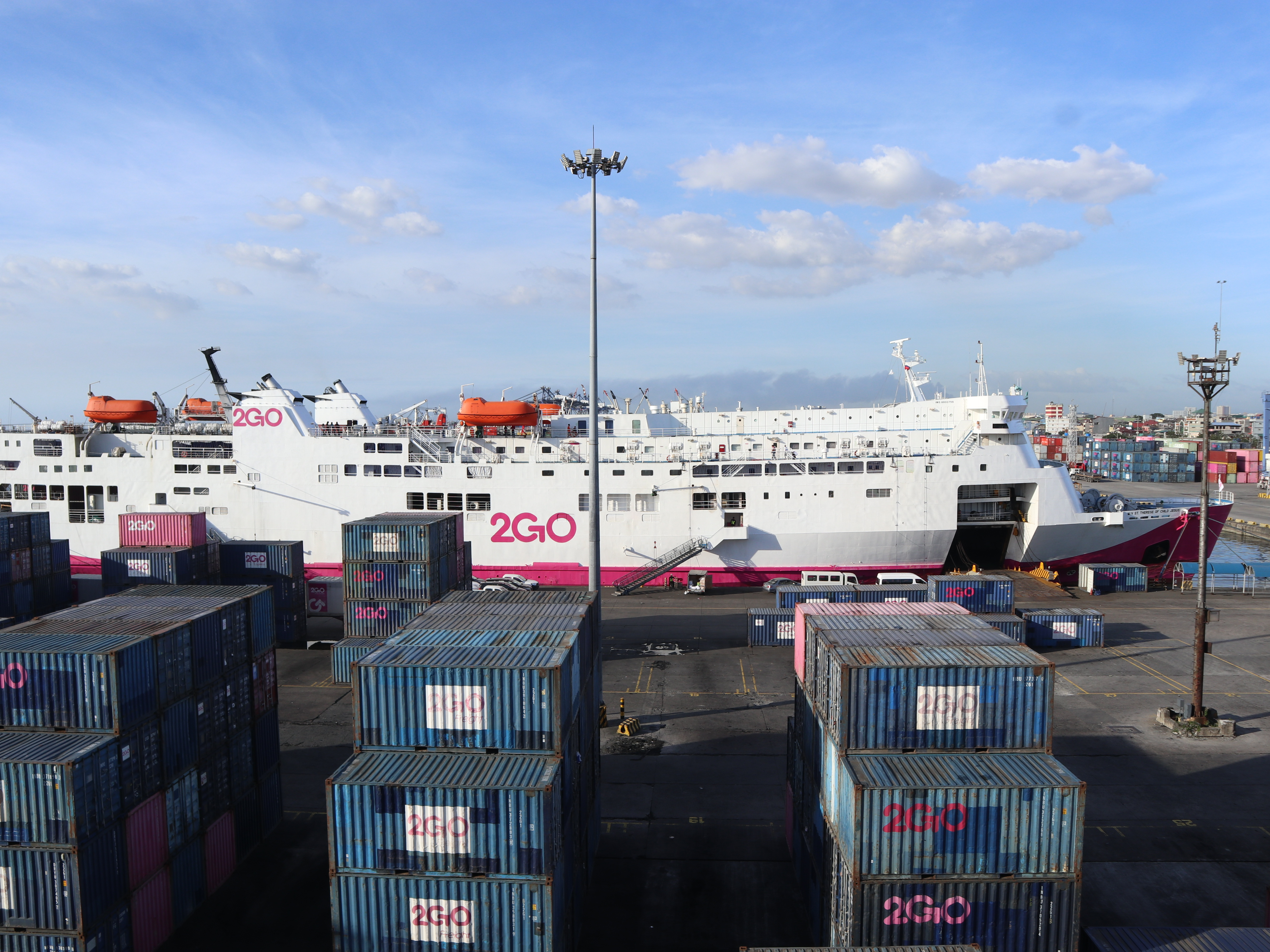
M/V St. "Therese of the Child Jesus" painted on the 2019 livery.

2GO revised its livery during this time to a much cleaner and simpler design. Although similar to its previous livery with the ships featuring an all-white livery dominating the hull and the superstructure, the funnel, which was previously painted magenta, is now painted in white. The "2GO Travel" branding which was previously seen on the hull was revised to feature only the word "2GO" and is now also painted on the funnel. The large letter "G" at the bow was removed, making the livery much simpler. The waterline and the deck retain their original colors.

In 2023, a new version of this livery was unveiled; it is identical to the old livery except for the addition of a large wave-like figure on the bow and stern mimicking the 2021 livery used by the newer 2GO ships. It was applied on the S Series vessels of 2GO.

This livery is currently used on all of the S Series vessels.

2021–present (M Series)

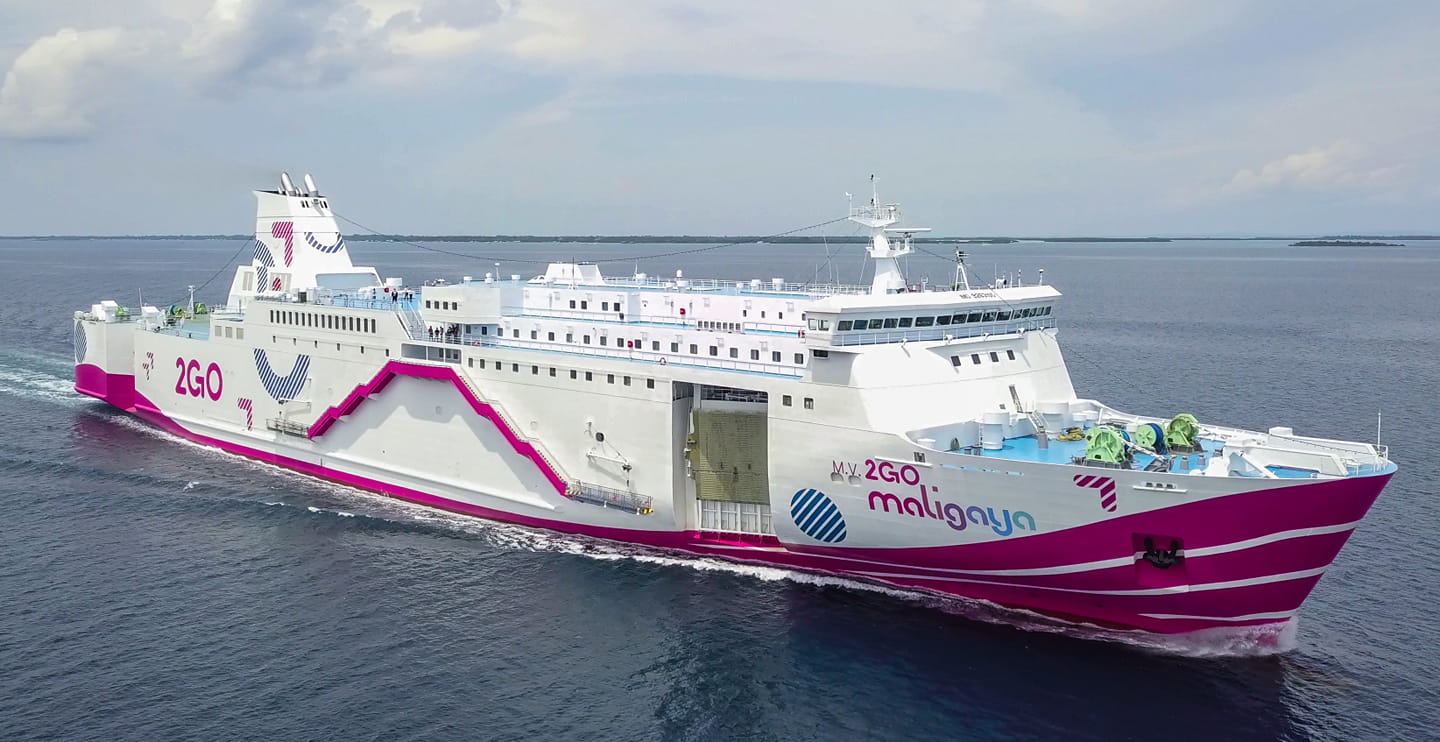
M/V "2GO Maligaya" painted on the current 2021 livery.

A new livery was unveiled in 2021 with the introduction of 2GO Maligaya, and later, 2GO Masagana. The livery was overhauled, giving the ships a more modern and festive appearance. Although still dominated with white and magenta colors, the livery features several colorful shapes scattered around the vessel representing 2GO's brand identity, core pillars, and values. The bow features a large wave-like figure painted in magenta with white stripes, with the vessels' names in a new font, painted in different colors akin to a rainbow. Future vessels will be painted with this version of livery.

== Incidents and accidents ==
=== MV St. Gregory the Great ===
On June 15, 2013, MV St. Gregory the Great, bound from Iloilo to Bacolod and Cagayan de Oro, allegedly took an improper shortcut and was involved in a grounding incident off the Siete Pecados Islands near Iloilo and Guimaras, damaging its hull and flooding its engine room with seawater. All 364 passengers onboard safely disembarked.

=== MV St. Thomas Aquinas ===
On August 16, 2013 at 9 pm, as it approached Cebu City's harbor, MV St. Thomas Aquinas, collided with the cargo ship MV Sulpicio Express Siete of Philippine Span Asia Carrier Corporation and sank in 100-foot-deep water off Talisay, Cebu. The ship was carrying 831 people—715 passengers and 116 crewmembers. 629 people were rescued immediately and as of August 17, 2013, 31 bodies had been recovered leaving 172 unaccounted for. MV Sulpicio Express Siete with 36 crew members on board did not sink and returned safely to port. It had a large hole in its bow above the waterline, clearly visible in news photos.

=== MV St. Anthony de Padua ===
On August 7, 2021, MV St. Anthony de Padua was undergoing quarantine in Bauan, Batangas after 28 of the 82 crew members aboard tested positive for the coronavirus disease 2019. There were no known passengers on board the vessel. The Maritime Industry Authority (MARINA) in Calabarzon suspended the vessel's passenger safety certificate, and Transport Secretary Arthur Tugade tasked MARINA, the Philippine Ports Authority (PPA), and the Philippine Coast Guard (PCG) to investigate possible lapses leading to the incident.

=== MV St. Francis Xavier ===
On June 8, 2024, MV St Francis Xavier experienced engine trouble while departing Coron and bound to Puerto Princesa. During its undocking maneuver, the vessel lost all power and was left dead in the water so the crew anchored the ship to prevent it from drifting. While engineers worked on restoring power, the vessel's stern ran aground in a shallow area near the pier due to low tide. The power was restored at 10PM, but the ship remained immobilized as the stern was still grounded. All passengers were safely disembarked. There were no signs of leakage or oil spills around the vessel. On June 9, MV St. Francis Xavier returned to the port of Coron for a thorough assessment and later continued its voyage.

== Trivia ==
- 2GO Maligaya, Masagana, and Masinag, are the only Philippine ships that have both an escalator and an elevator. 2GO Masikap has only an elevator, and 2GO Masigla has only an escalator.
- 2GO Travel operates 7 of the largest passenger ferry vessels in the country, including 2GO Maligaya, and Masagana, the largest ships ever to sail in the Philippines with a length of 195 meters and a gross tonnage of 29,046 tons, surpassing the previous record holder, M/V Princess of the Stars of Sulpicio Lines which has a length of 193 meters and a gross tonnage of 23,824 tons
- 2GO Travel is the only remaining Manila-based major interisland passenger ferry company. Its last competitor, Philippine Span Asia Carrier Corporation (Formerly Sulpicio Lines), exited the industry and focused on its cargo and container division.

== Gallery ==
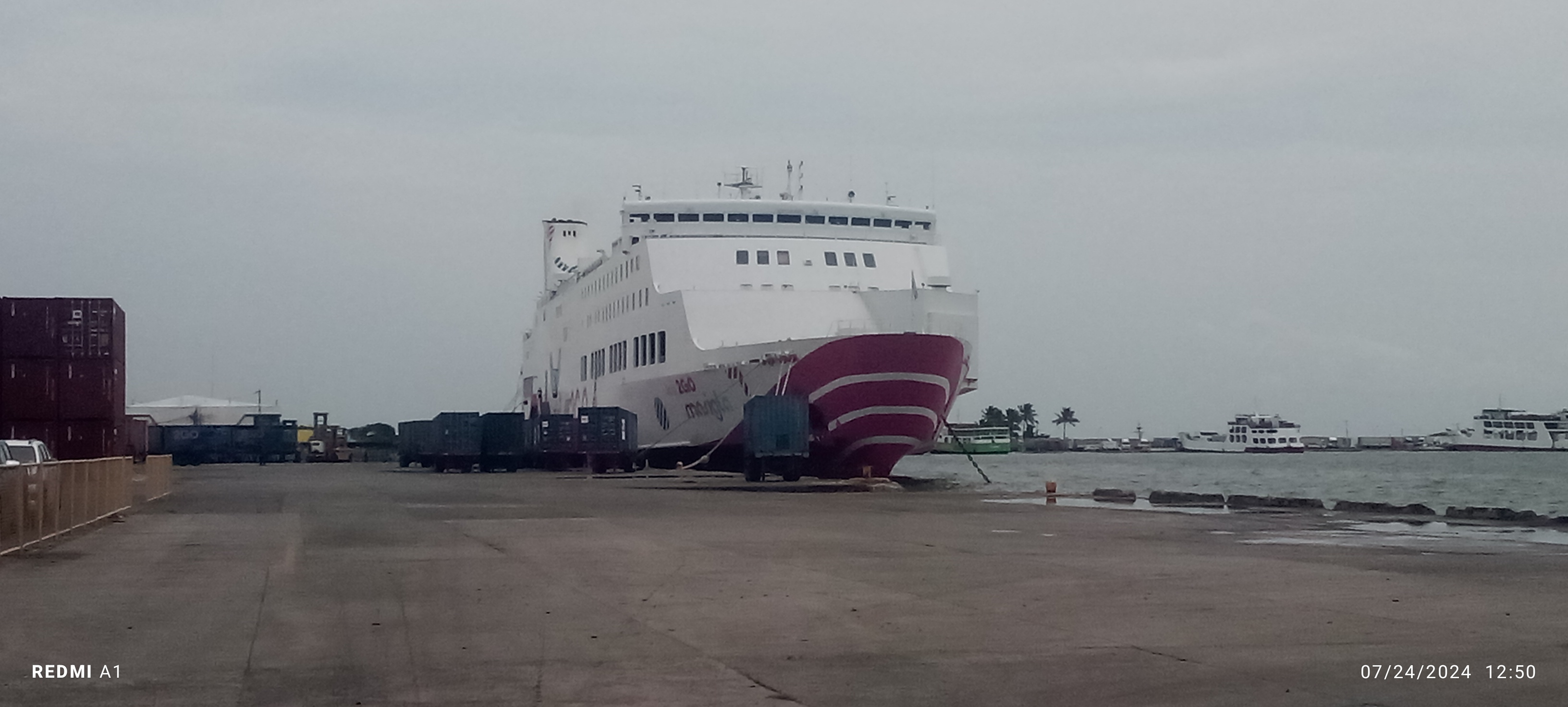
MV 2GO Masigla at BREDCO Port, Bacolod City

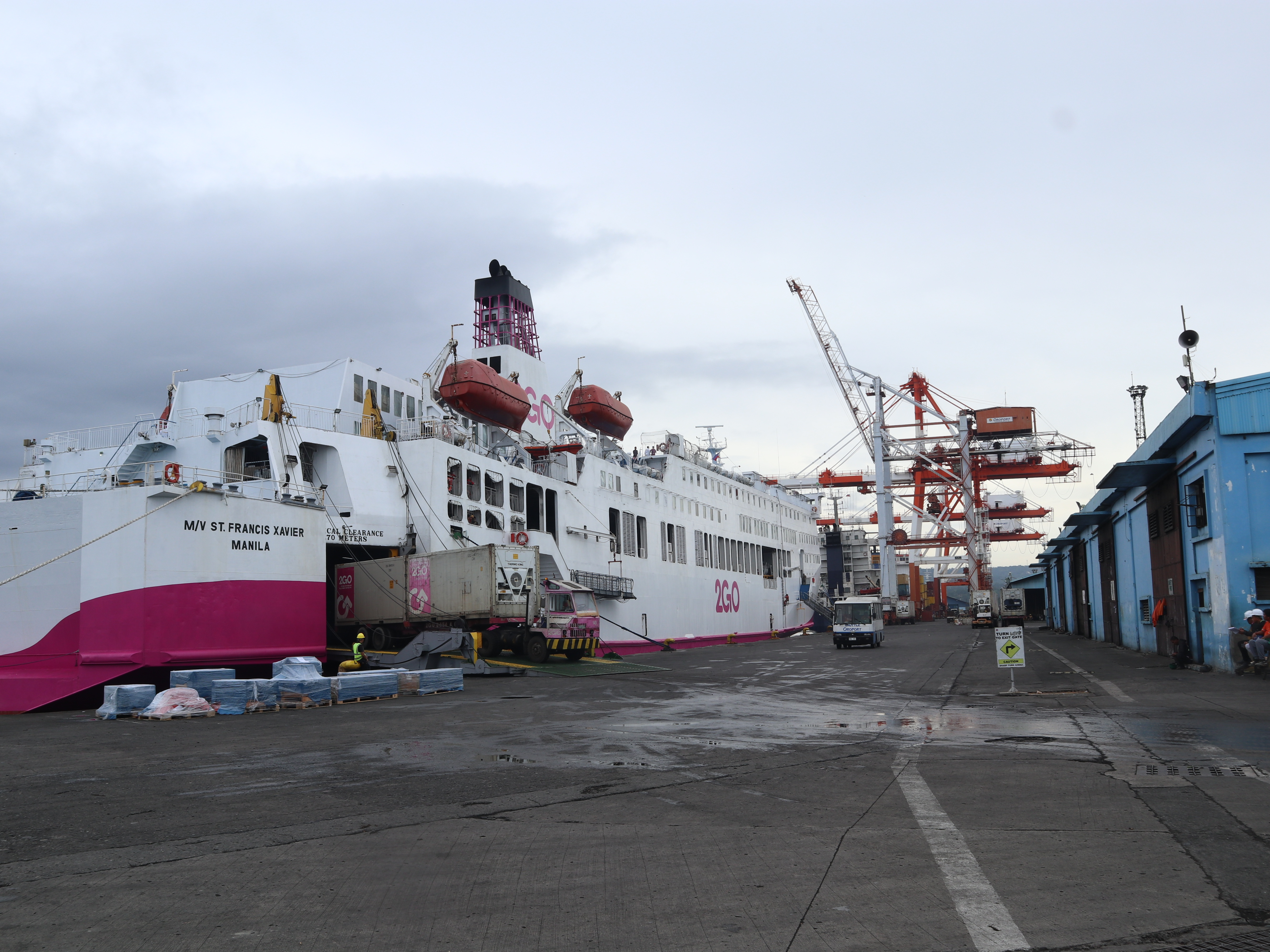
MV St. Francis Xavier at Port of Cagayan de Oro

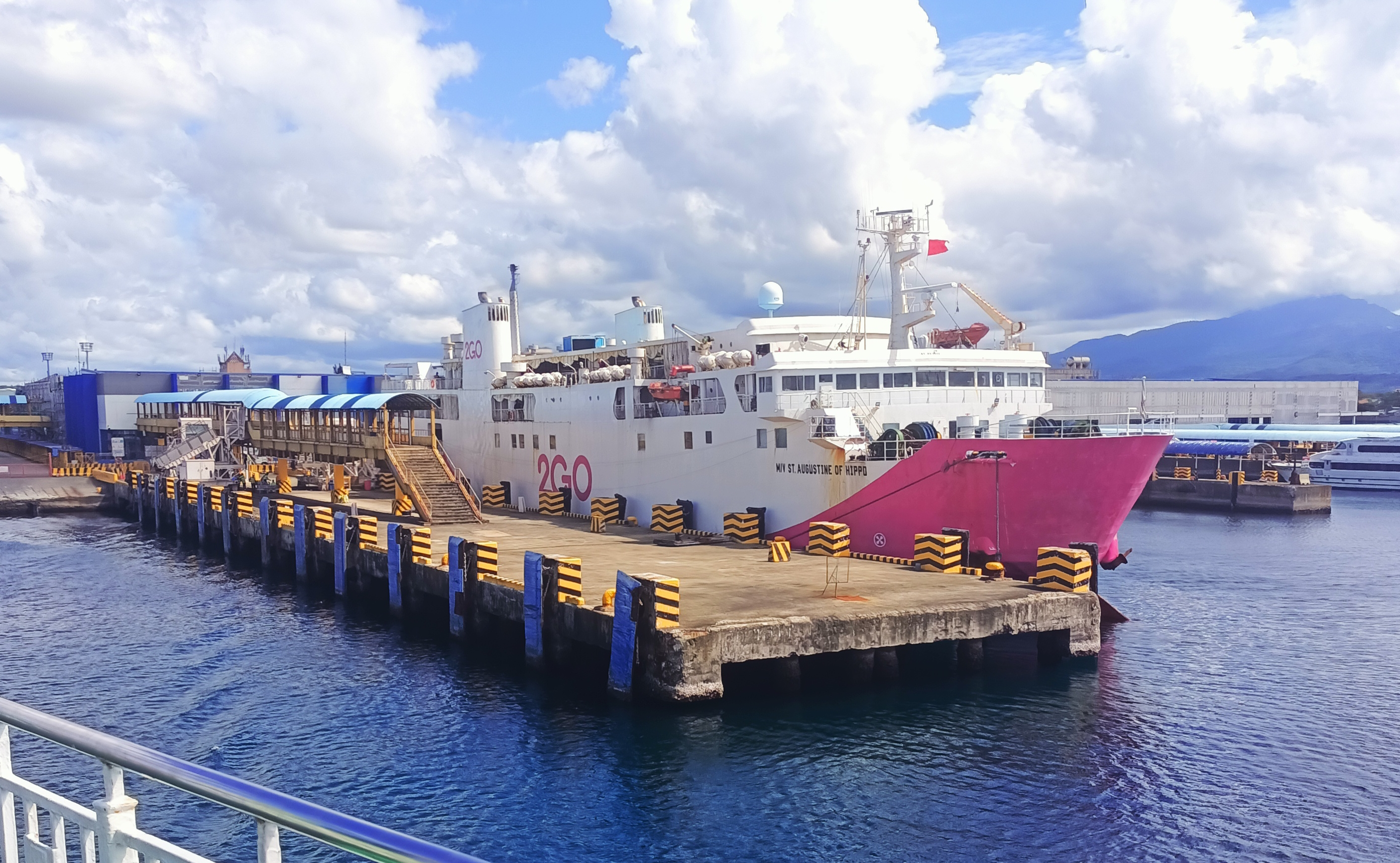
MV St. Augustine of Hippo at Batangas Port

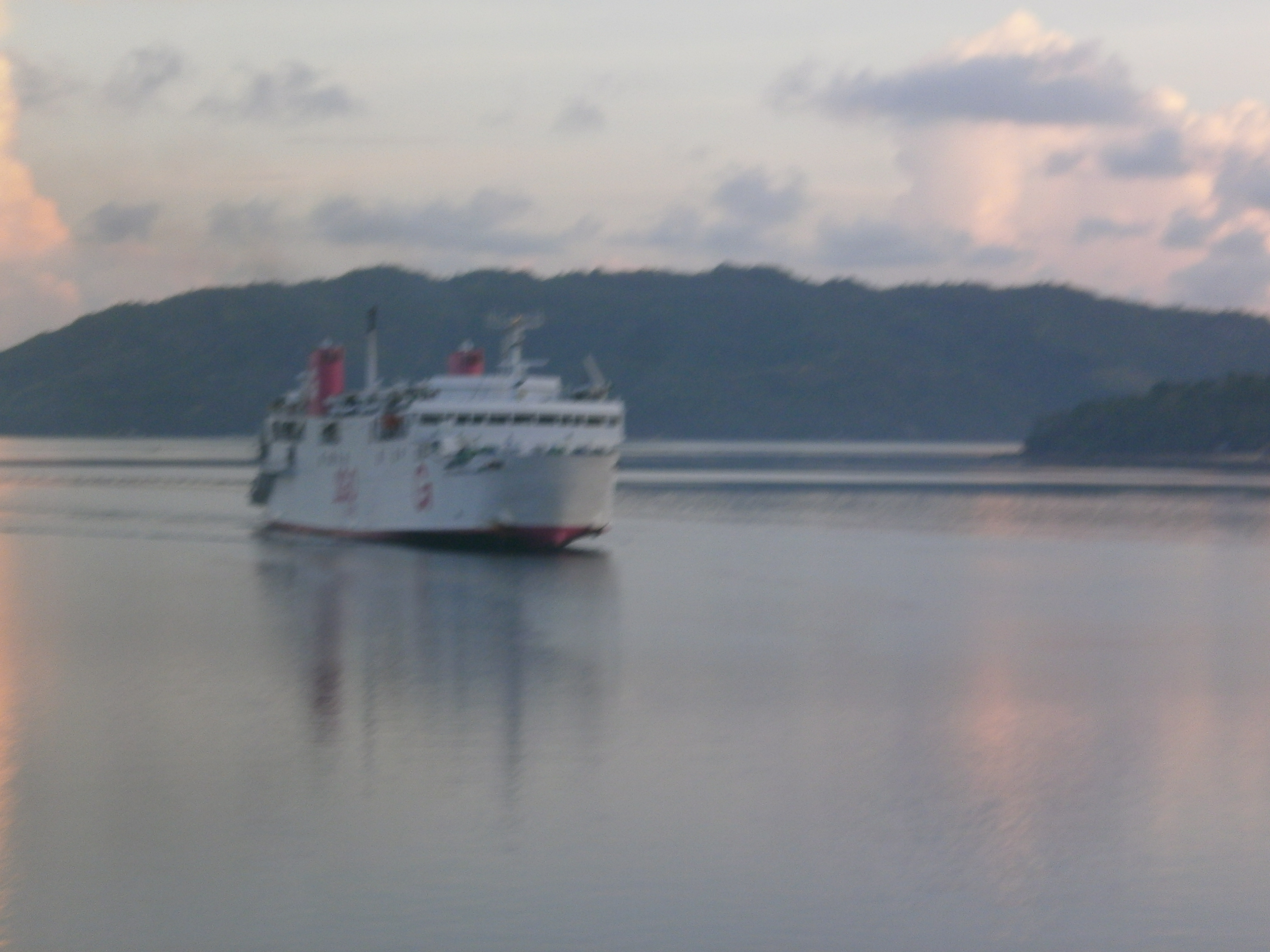
MV St. Augustine of Hippo at Romblon Bay

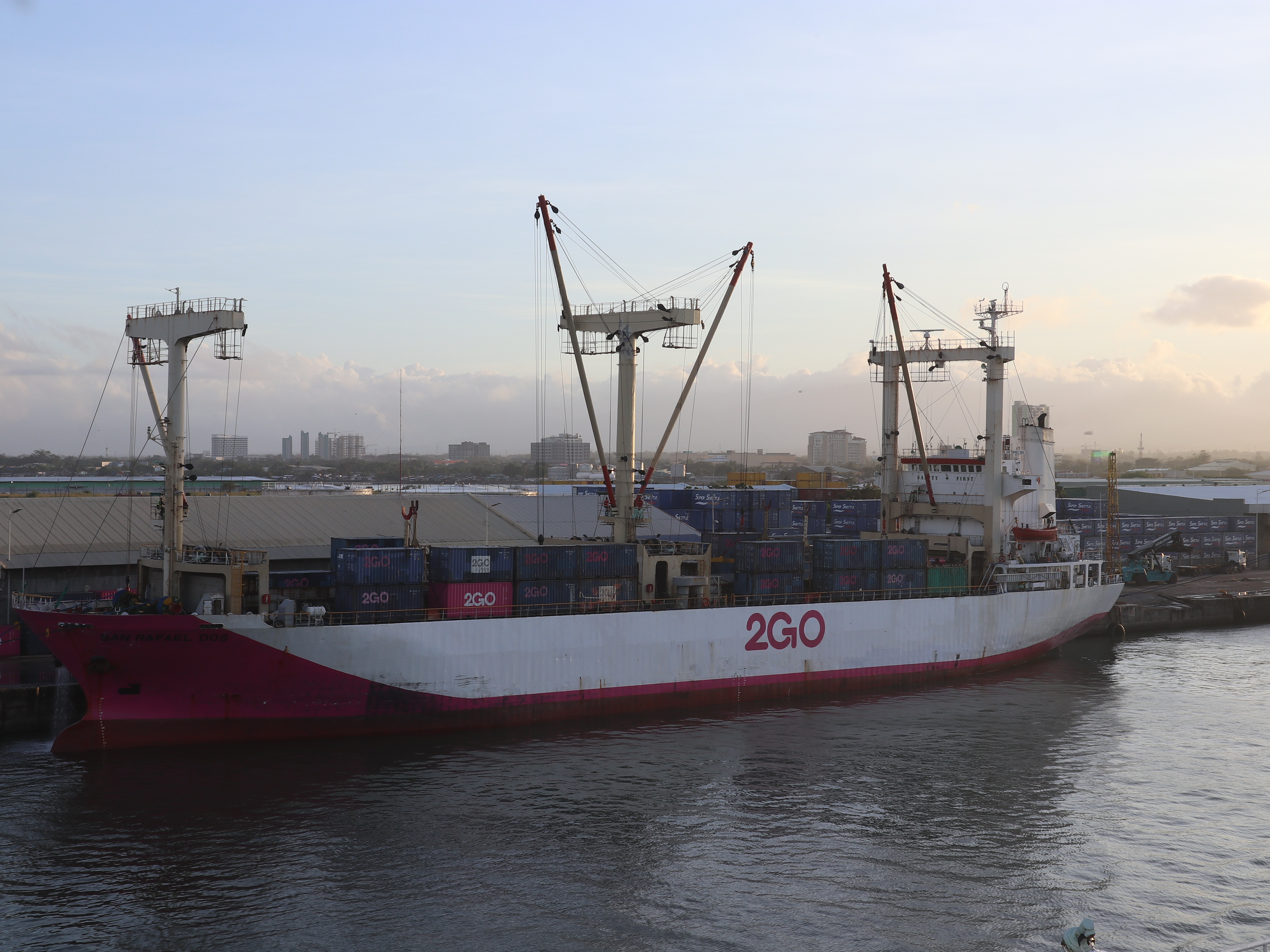
MV San Rafael Dos at BREDCO Port, Bacolod City

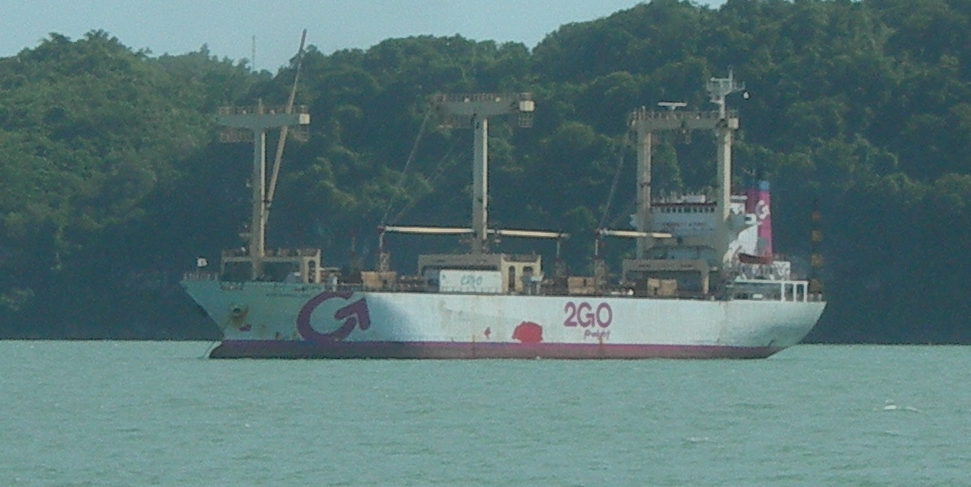
MV San Rafael Dos at Iloilo Strait

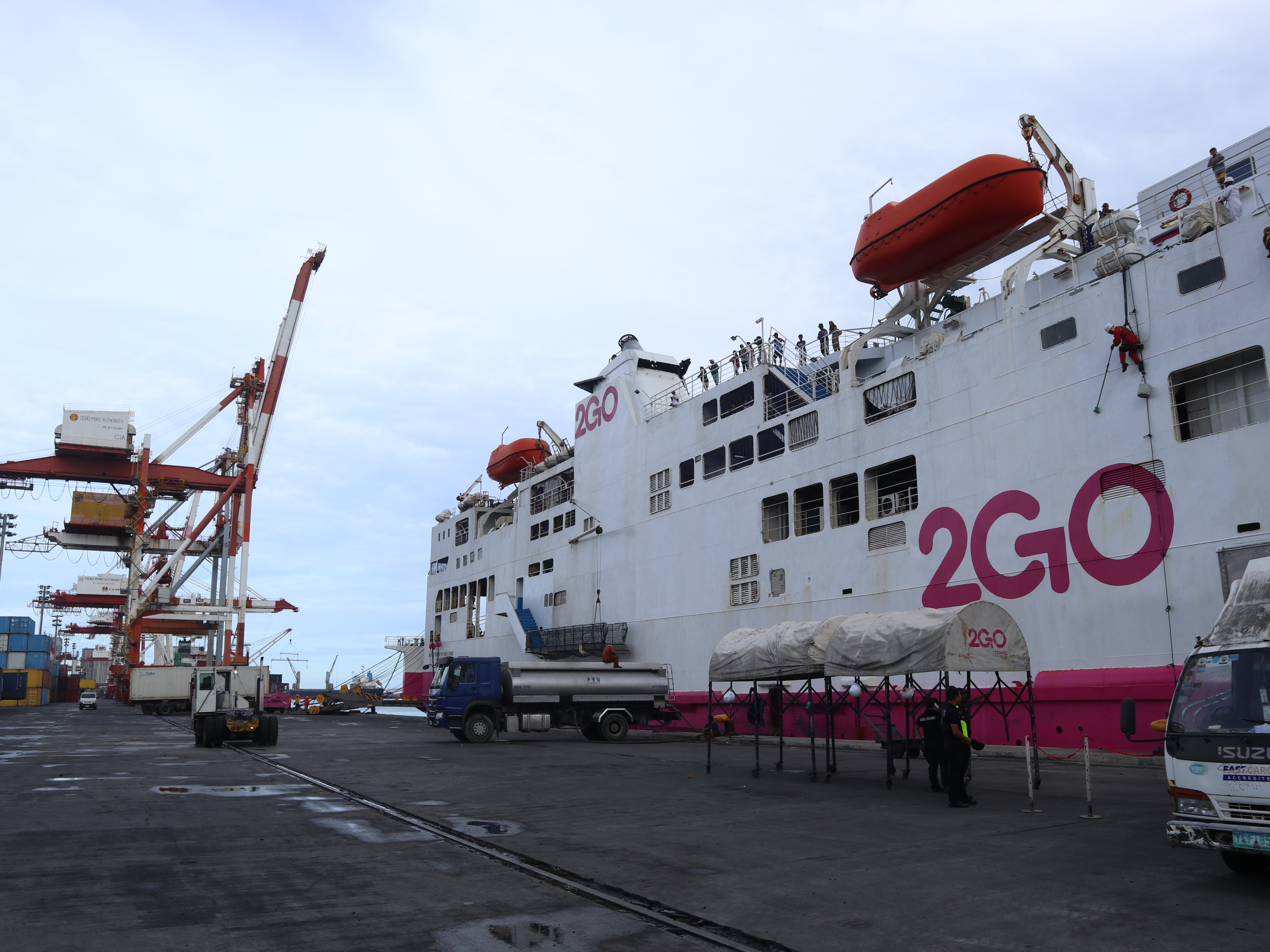
MV St. Therese of Child Jesus at Cebu Port

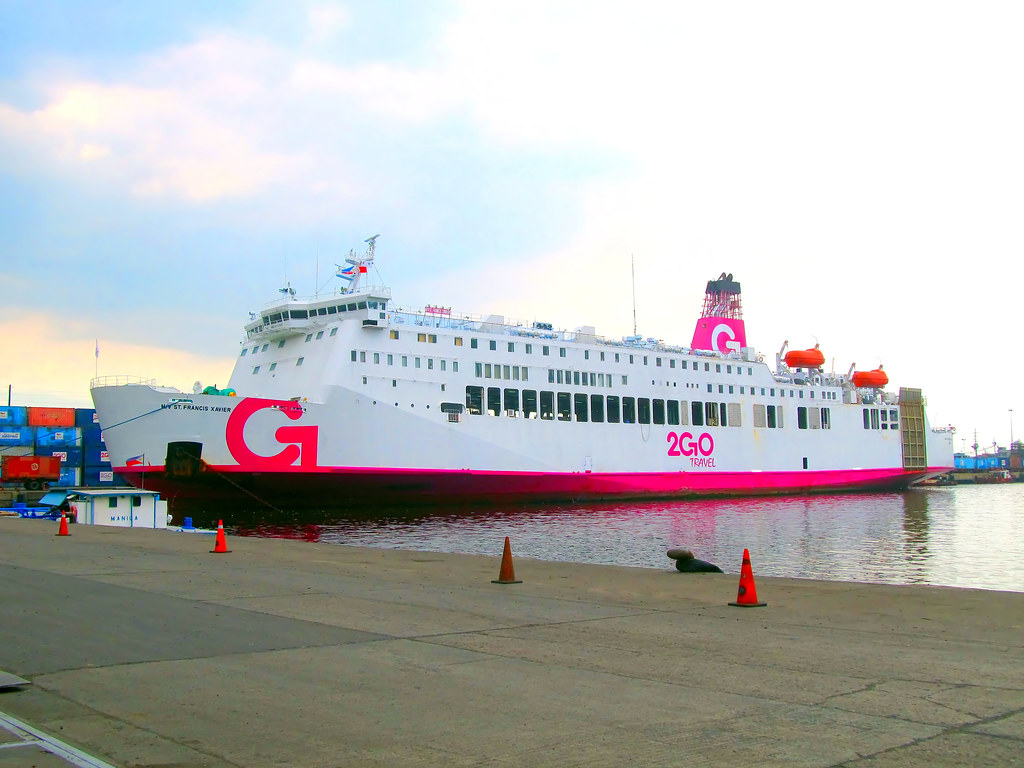
MV St. Francis Xavier at Manila North Harbor

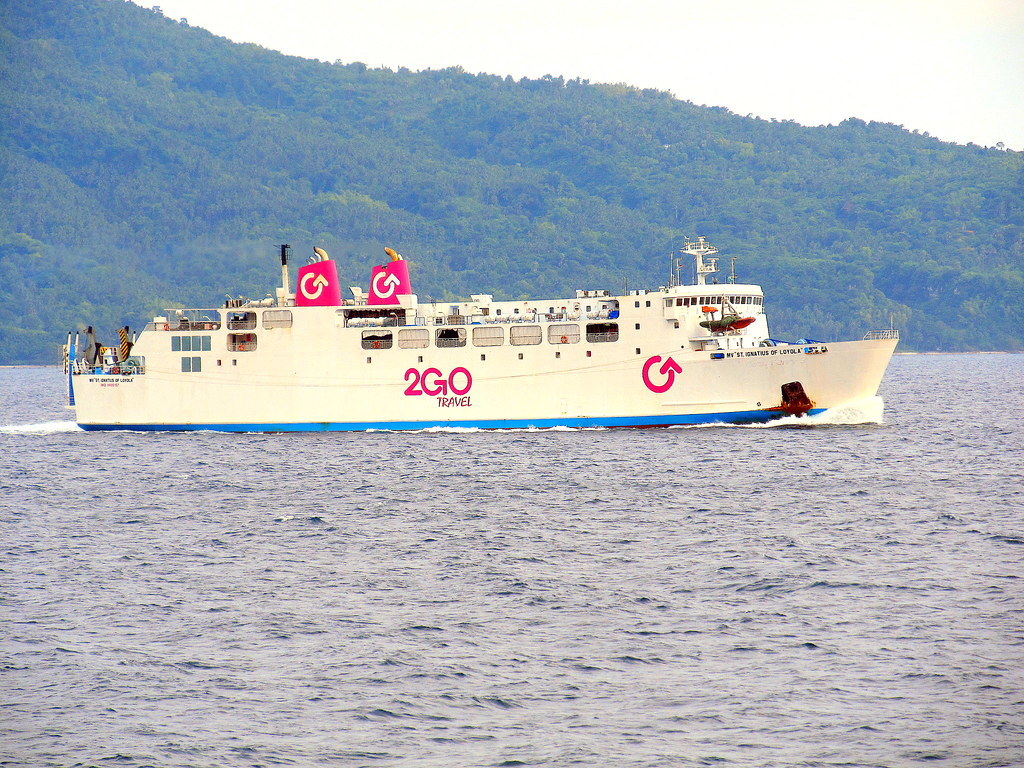
MV St. Ignatius of Loyola

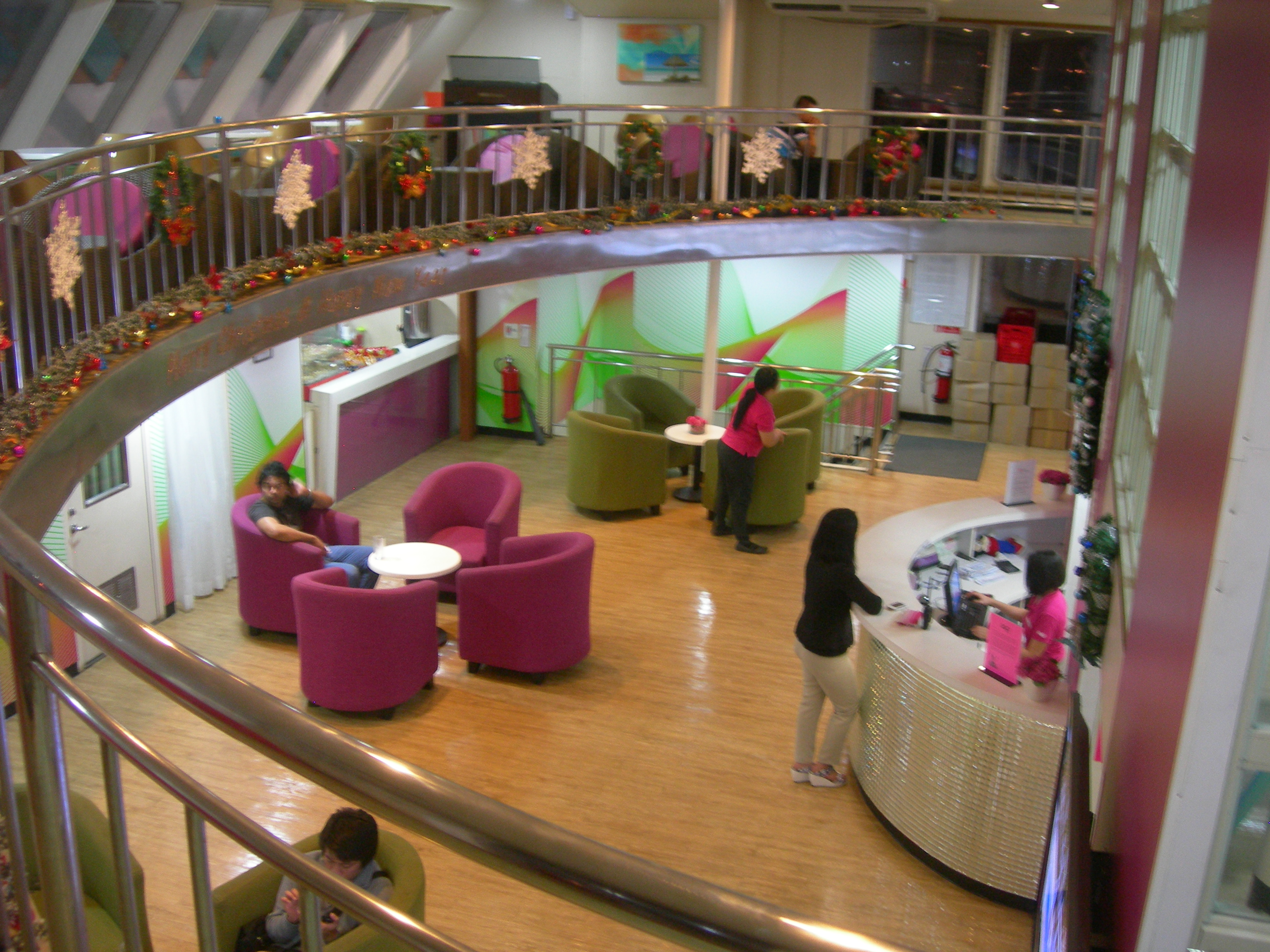
Interior of MV St. Ignatius of Loyola

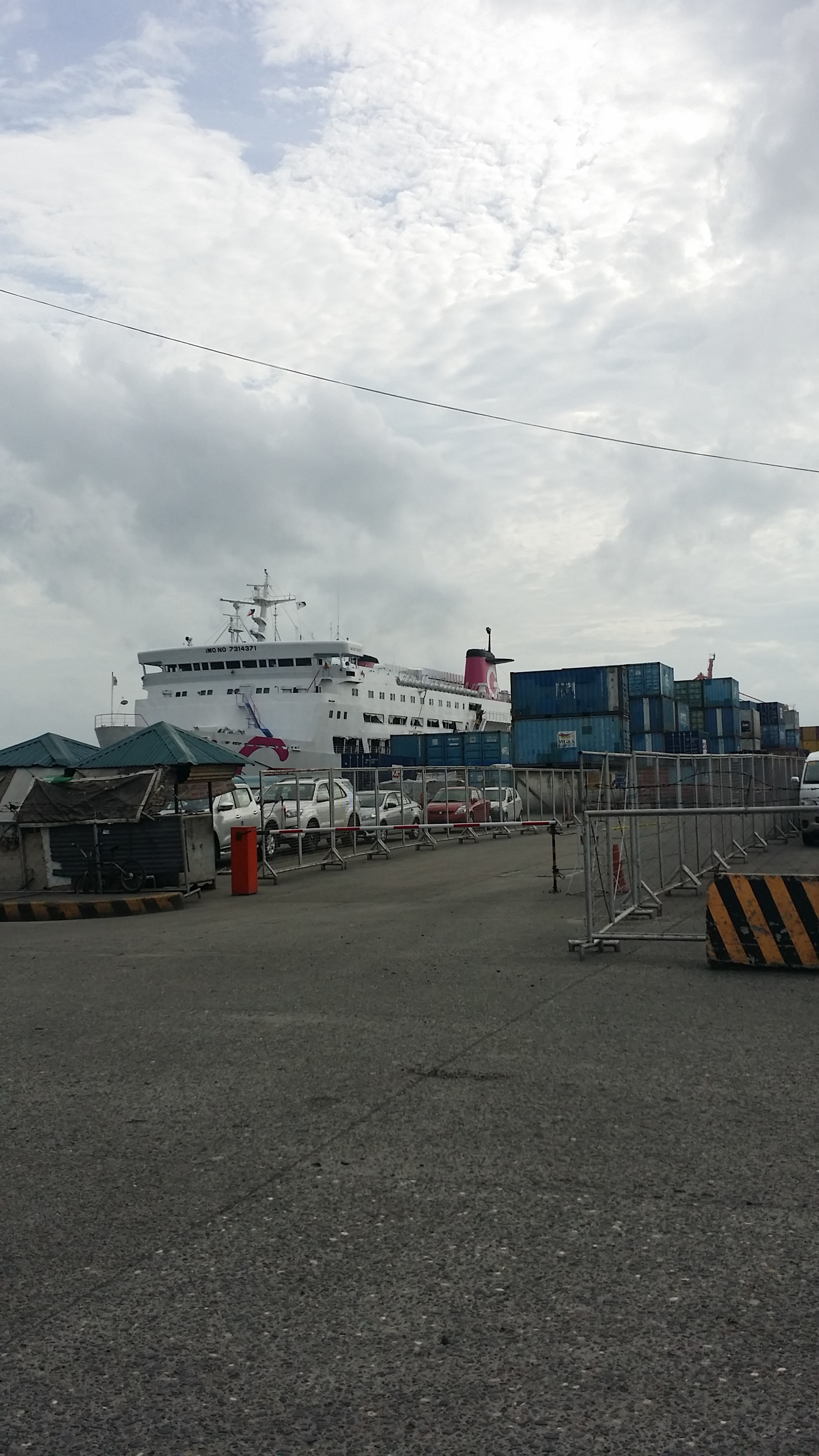
MV St. Joan Of Arc at Manila North Harbor

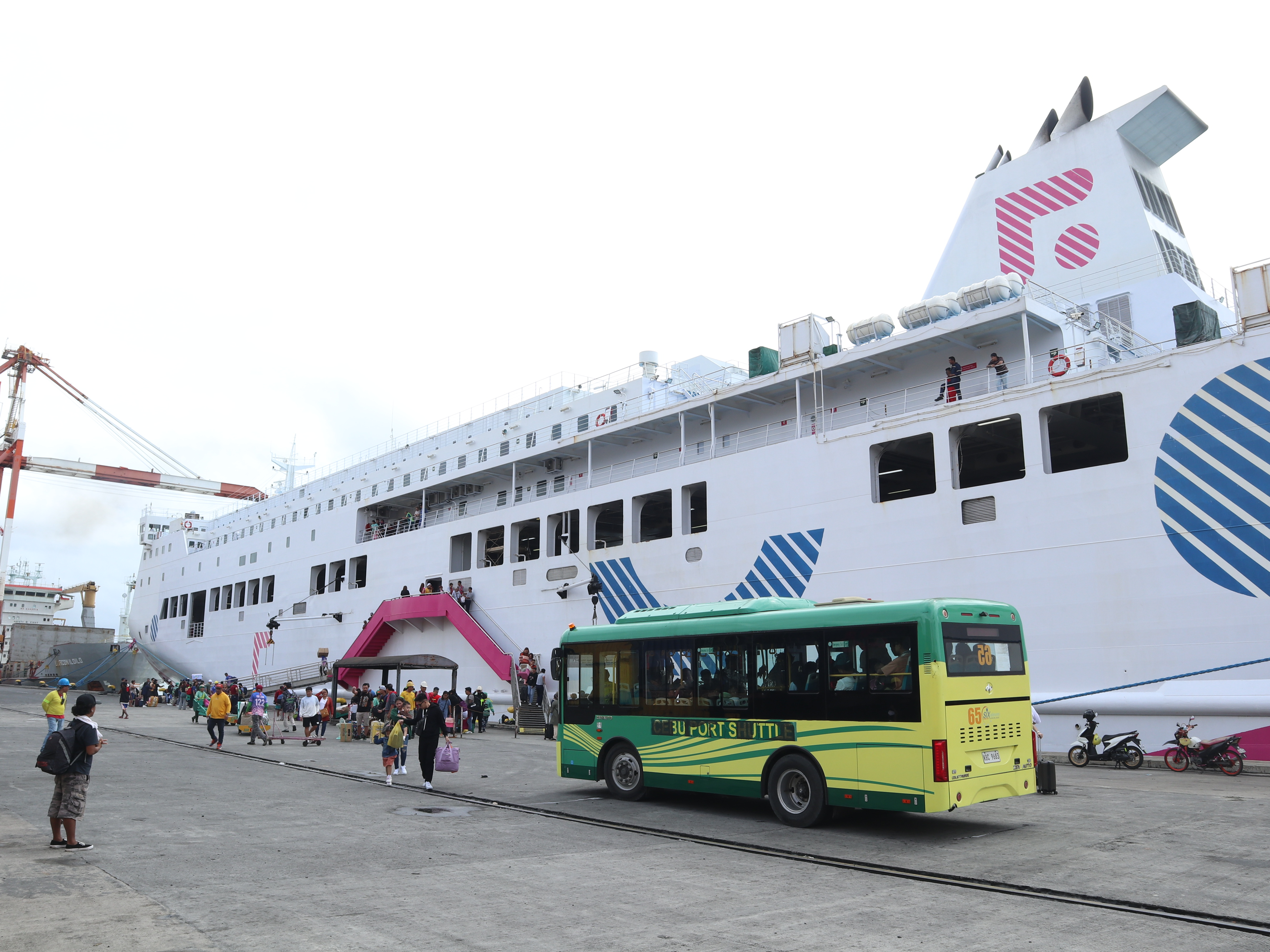
MV 2GO Masikap at Pier 4, Cebu International Port

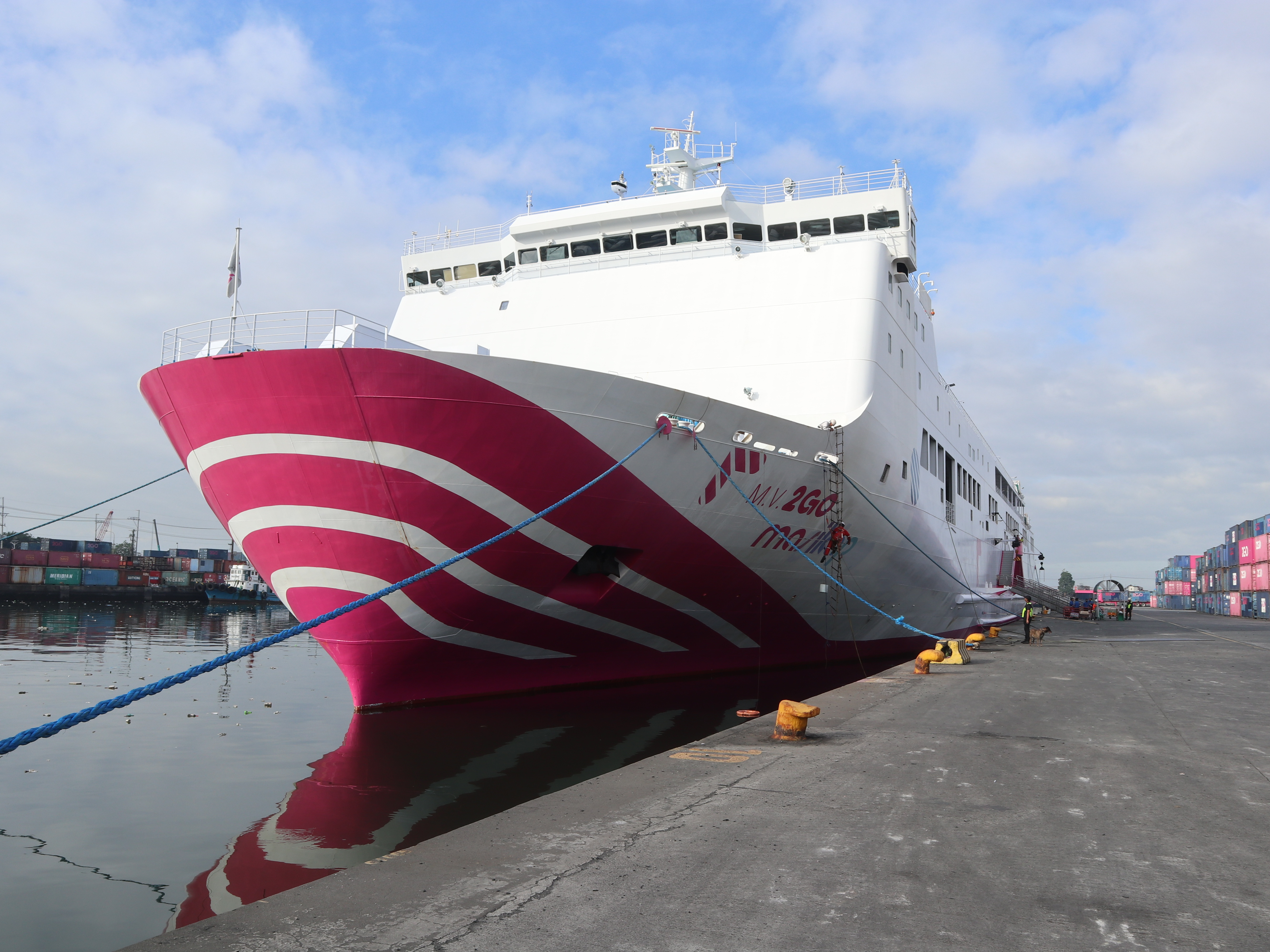
MV 2GO Masikap at Pier 4, Manila North Harbor

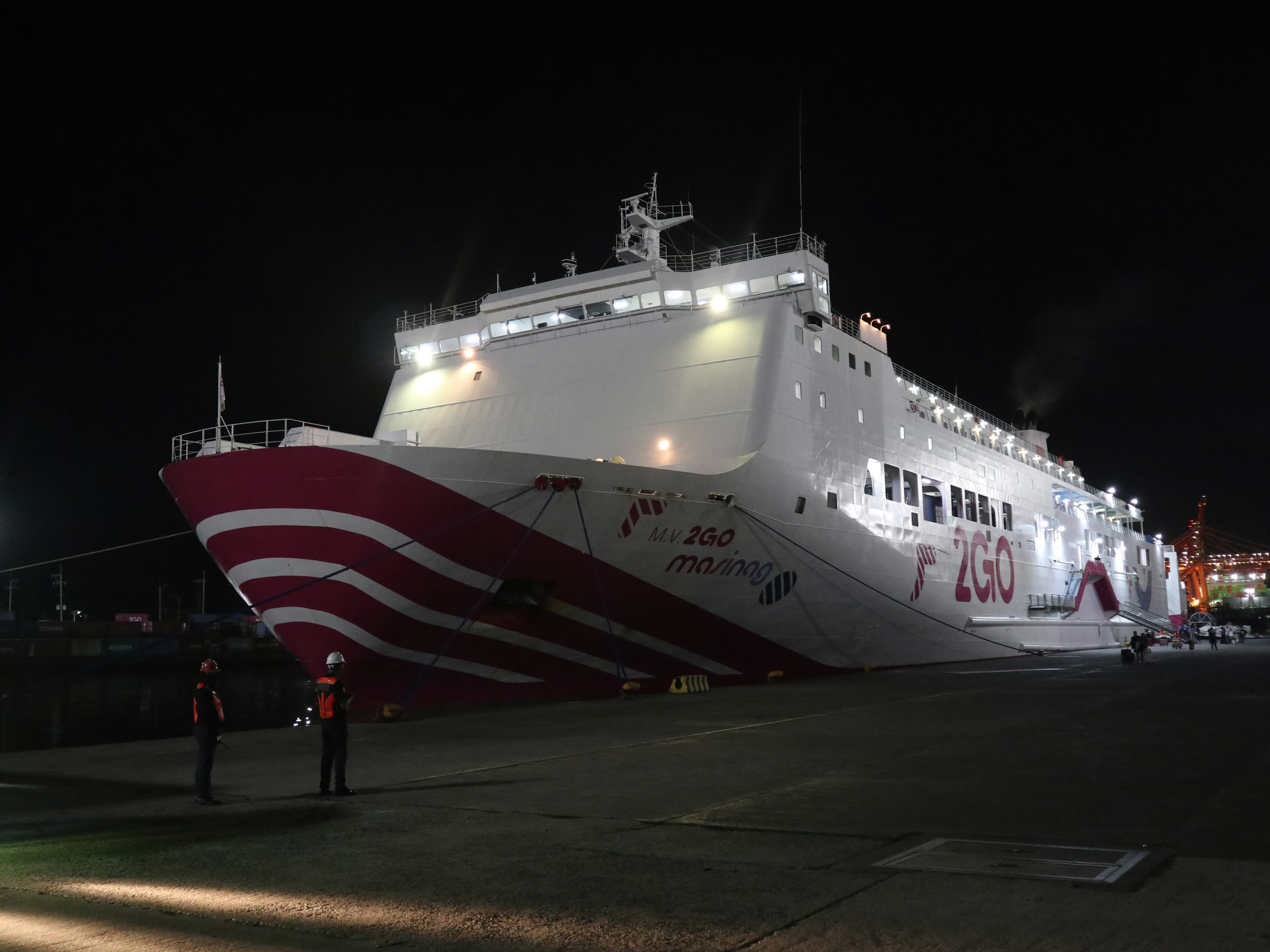
MV 2GO Masinag at Pier 4, Manila North Harbor

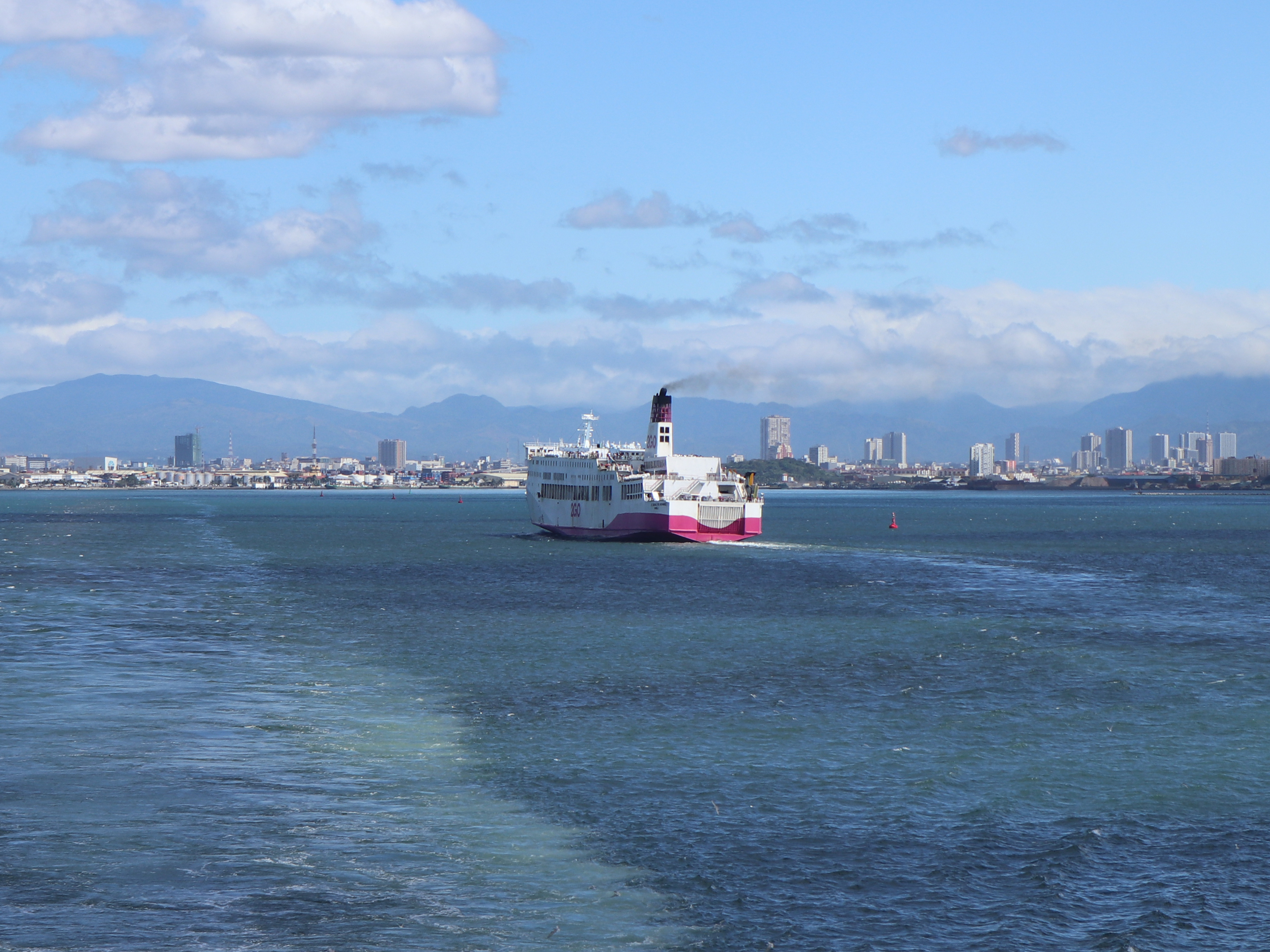
MV St. Michael the Archangel at Manila Bay

== See also ==
- Starlite Ferries
- Montenegro Lines
- SuperCat
- Roble Shipping Inc.
- Trans-Asia Shipping Lines
- Cokaliong Shipping Lines
- List of shipping companies in the Philippines
