= Port of Manila =

Port of Manila Pantalan ng Maynila
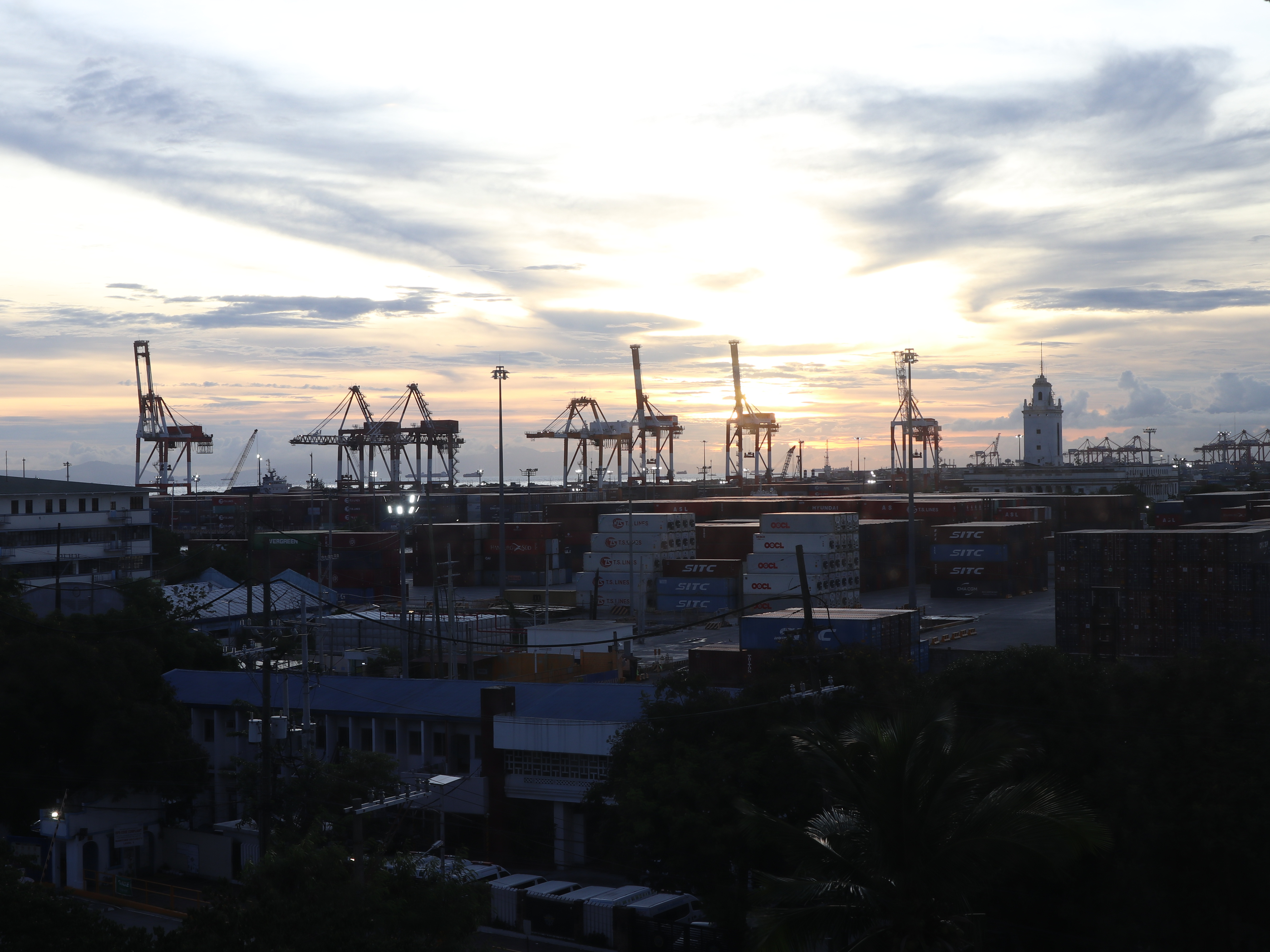
- Manila South Harbor
- Interactive map of Port of Manila; Pantalan ng Maynila

Location
- Country: Philippines
- Location: Port Area and Tondo, Manila
- Coordinates: 14°35′48″N 120°57′16″E
- UN/LOCODE: PHMNL

Details
- Opened: 12th century
- Operated by: Philippine Ports Authority
- Owned by: Government of Manila
- Type of harbour: Natural/Artificial
- Land area: 137.5 hectares (340 acres)
- No. of berths: 22
- No. of piers: 12

Statistics
- Vessel arrivals: 20,828^{(2012)}
- Annual cargo tonnage: 75,058,855^{(2012)}
- Annual container volume: 4,523,339 TEU^{(2016)}
- Passenger traffic: 72,438,609^{(2017)}
- Website www.ppa.com.ph

The Port of Manila (Filipino: Pantalan ng Maynila) refers to the collective facilities and terminals that process maritime trade function in harbors in Metro Manila. Located in the Port Area and Tondo districts of Manila, facing Manila Bay, it is the largest and the premier international shipping gateway to the country. The Philippine Ports Authority, a government-owned corporation, manages the Port of Manila and most of the public ports in the country. It is composed of 3 major facilities, namely Manila North Harbor, Manila South Harbor, and the Manila International Container Terminal.

== History ==
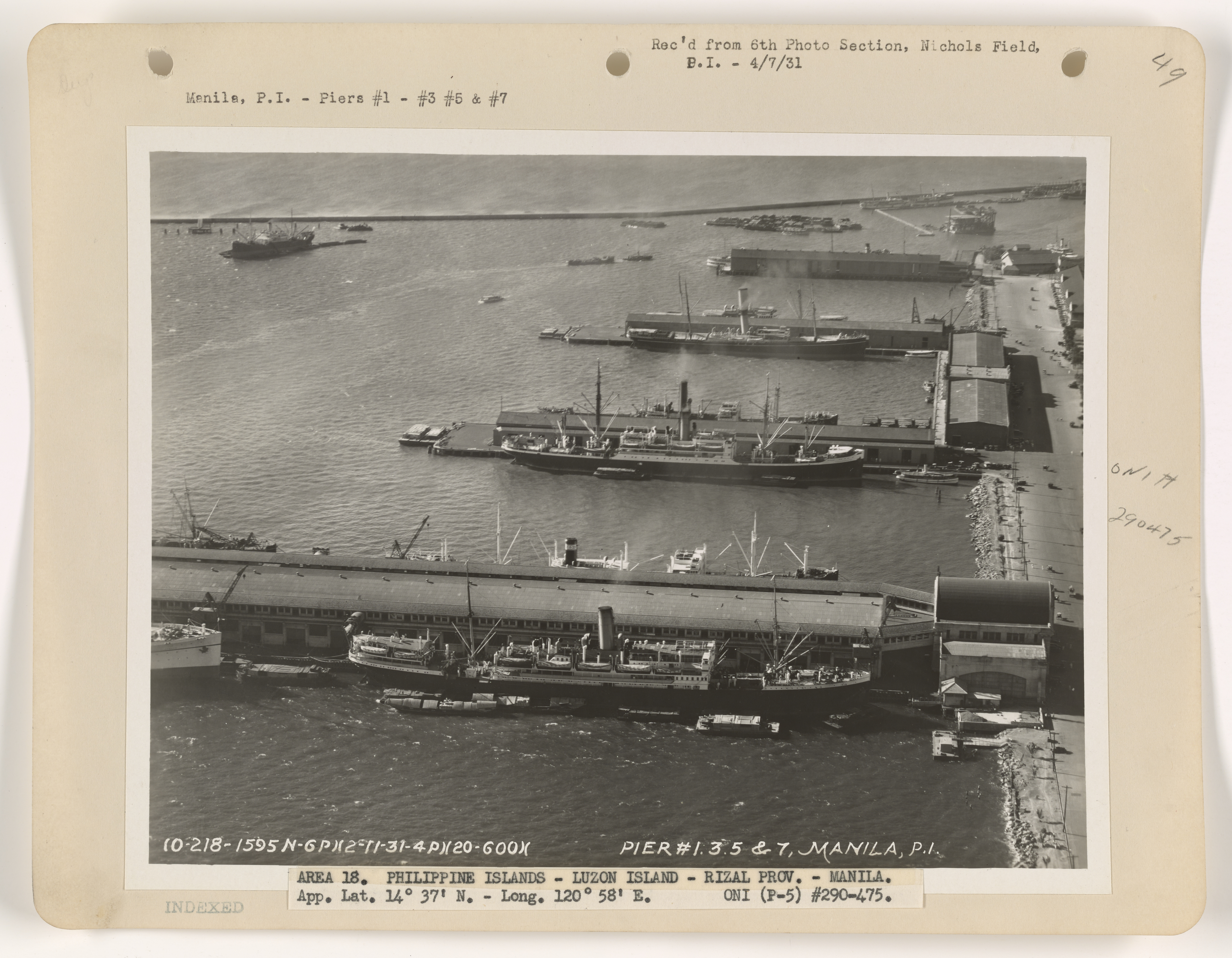
Aerial view of Piers #1, #3, #5 and #7 in 1931

Trade in Manila Bay dates at least ninth to twelfth centuries when Manila traded with neighboring countries including China and Japan, with ties to India through the areas that are now Malaysia and Indonesia. During the Spanish Colonial Era of the Philippines Manila handled trade with China and other East Asian countries, with Mexico, with Arab countries, and directly with Spain from the 16th to mid-19th century when the port was opened to all trade. This was the galleon trade that connected the Philippines to Spain via Mexico, another Spanish territory. From the end of the galleon trade, through the American Colonial Era of the Philippines and Philippine independence, until today, the Port of Manila has been the main port of the Philippines for both domestic and international trade.

The port is part of the Maritime Silk Road that runs from the Chinese coast to the south via Singapore towards the southern tip of India, to Mombasa, then through the Suez Canal to the Mediterranean with its connections to Central and Eastern Europe.

== Location ==
The entrance to Manila Bay is 19 kilometers (12 mi) wide and expands to a width of 48 kilometers (30 mi). Mariveles, in the province of Bataan, is an anchorage just inside the northern entrance, and Sangley Point is the former location of Cavite Naval Base. On either side of the bay are volcanic peaks topped with tropical foliage. 40 kilometers (25 mi) to the north is the Bataan Peninsula and to the south is the province of Cavite.

== Facilities ==
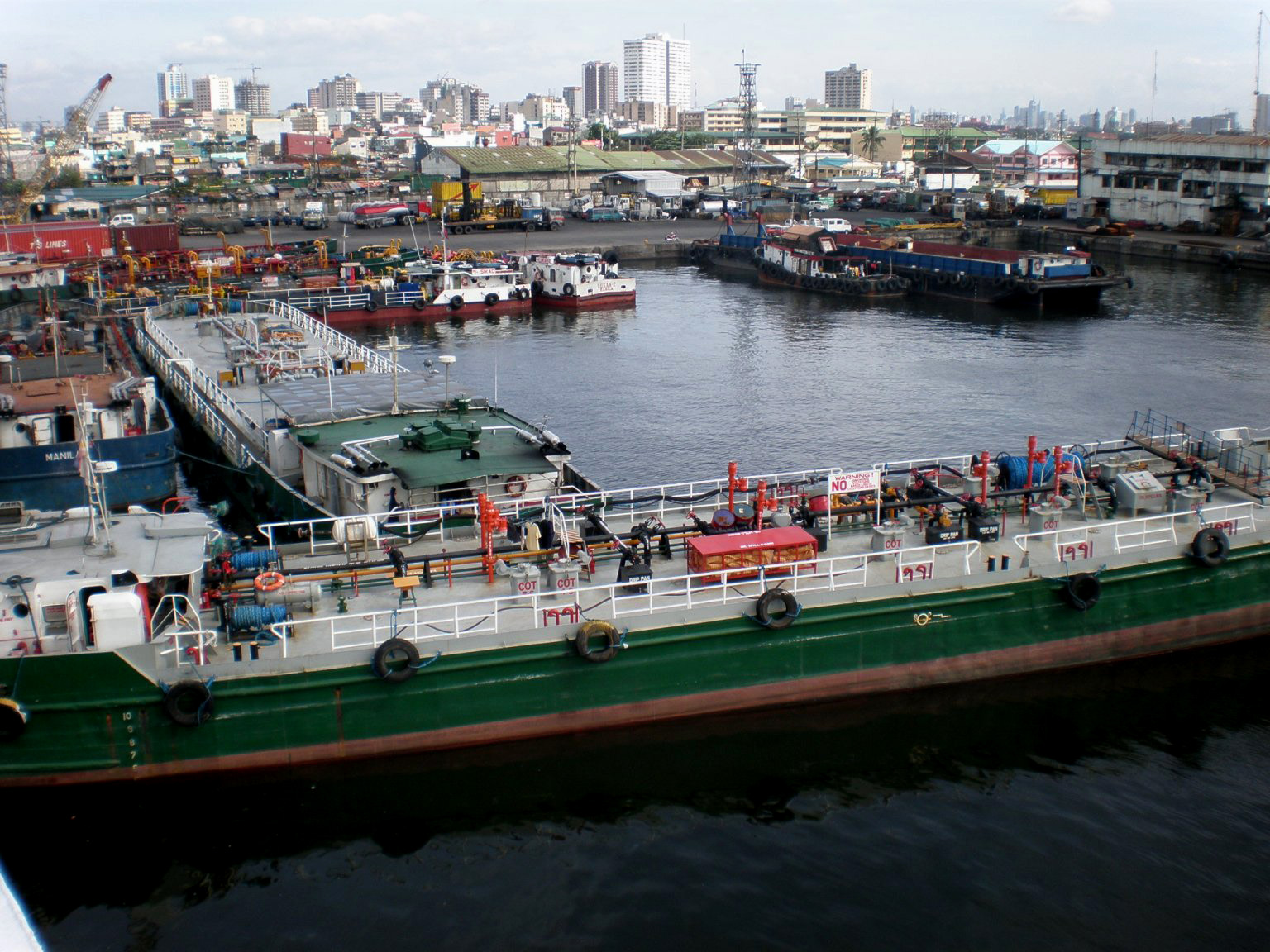
The skyline of Manila as seen from the top of a ship docked at the Manila North Harbor.

=== Manila North Harbor ===
Northport Passenger Terminal

Manila North Harbor (seaport code:MNN), occupies a 53-hectare (130-acre) area in Tondo, Manila and is operated by the Manila North Harbour Port Inc., a subsidiary of International Container Terminal Services Inc. It has 7 piers (numbered with even numbers: 2, 4, 6, 8, 10, 12 and 14). North Harbor is accessible through Mel Lopez Boulevard (Radial Road 10).

The North Port Passenger Terminal, opened in 2013, can accommodate 2–3 million passengers sailing on inter-island ferries to cities throughout the archipelago. It is the main hub of 2GO ferry company, the largest inter-island ferry company in the Philippines.

Statistics
Year	Cargo Tonnage	Container Volume	Passengers
2010	17,207,751	16,146,329	821,983
2011	17,806,136	18,442,473	728,662
2012	19,402,011	19,174,424	766,942

=== Manila South Harbor ===
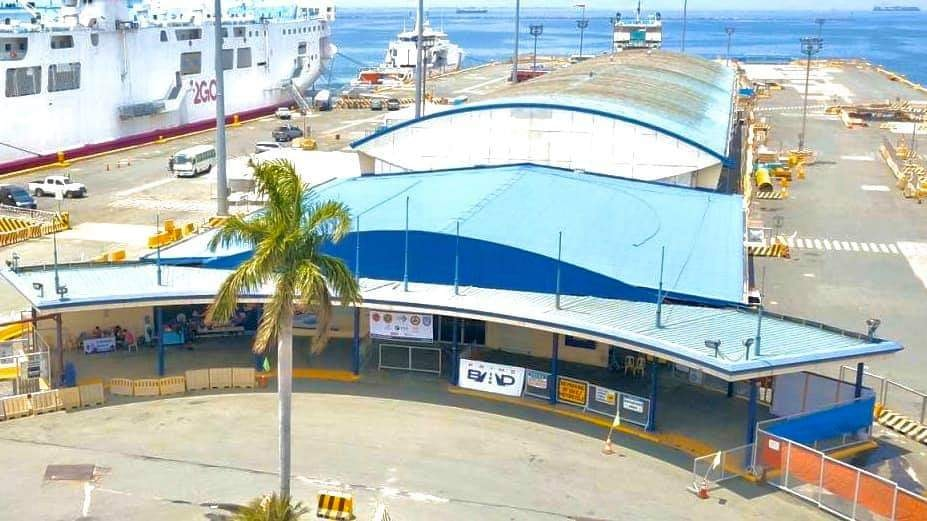
The Eva Macapagal Super Terminal.

Manila South Harbor (seaport code:MNS), is an 80-hectare (200-acre) port facility located in Port Area, Manila operated by Asian Terminals Incorporated, with 5 piers numbered with odd-numbers 3, 5, 9, 13 and 15. It is accessible through Bonifacio Drive/Radial Road 1 and has a passenger terminal located between Pier 13 and 15 named Eva Macapagal Super Terminal. It was formerly the main hub of 2GO ferry company. In April 2014, a new Liebherr quay crane was installed to increase the efficiency of the harbor.

Statistics
Year	Cargo Tonnage	Container Volume	Passengers
2010	40,816,716	12,958,525	1,004,780
2011	44,067,826	12,612,780	816,839
2012	40,317,702	11,130,626	161,500

=== Manila International Container Terminal ===
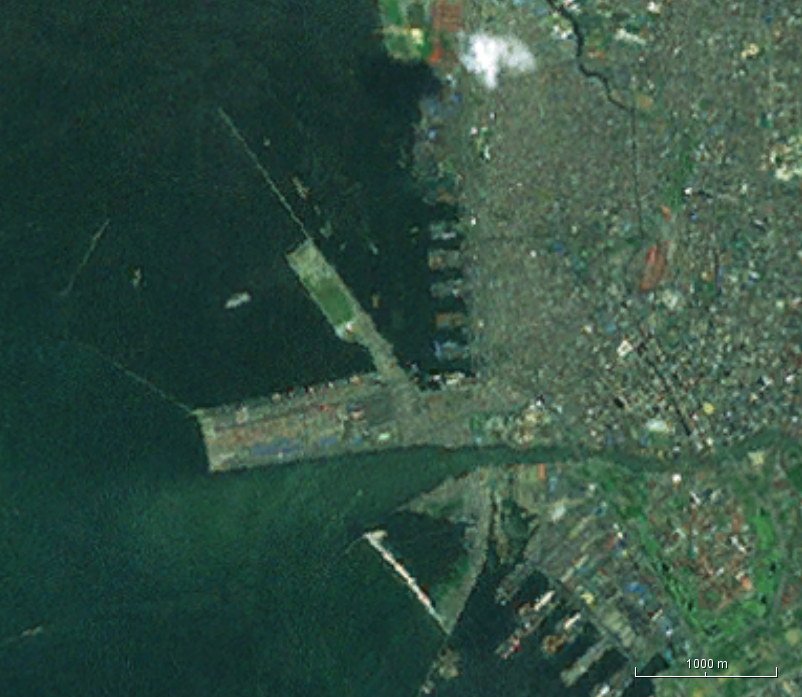
Landsat view of the Container Terminal

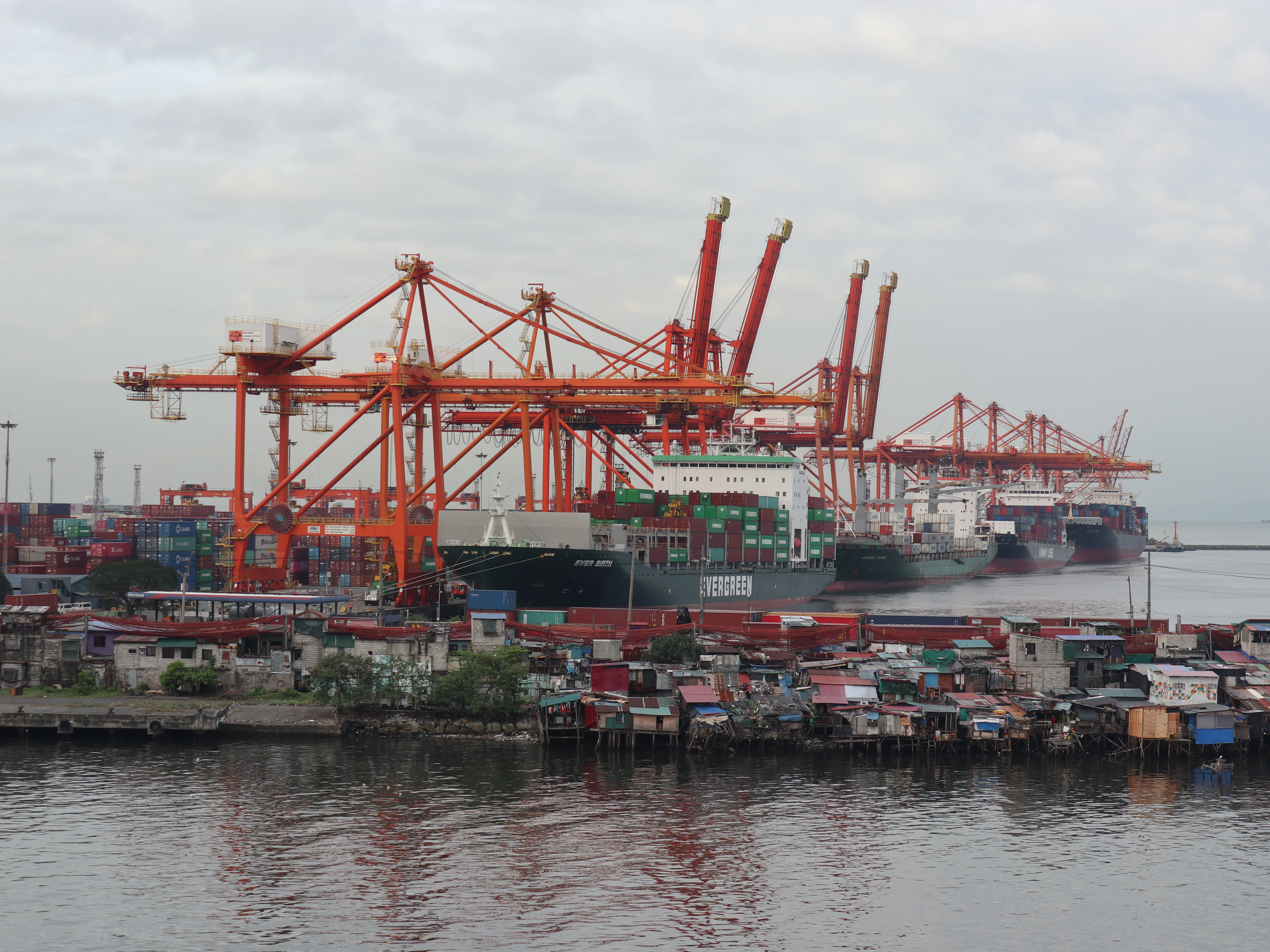
Cranes at the Manila International Container Terminal

Manila International Container Terminal (seaport code:MNL) is operated by International Container Terminal Services Inc. It is one of Asia's major seaports and one of the Philippines' most active ports. It is located between the Manila North Harbor and the Manila South Harbor and can be accessed by road through MICT South Access Road.

In 2019, Manila International Container Terminal ranked 29th in the list of world's busiest container ports with Twenty-foot equivalent units (TEUs) of 5,315. Inaugurated on July 7, 2012, Berth 6 became fully operational and increased the Port's annual capacity by 450,000 TEUs.

Statistics
Year	Number of Vessel	Cargo Tonnage	Container Volume
2010	1,942	32,225,795	18,266,554
2011	1,941	34,377,129	18,689,936
2012	1,862	34,345,059	19,966,465

== Future plans ==
It has been suggested by Japan International Cooperation Agency (JICA) and National Economic and Development Authority (NEDA) on the 2014 study Metro Manila Dream Plan to place a cap for the expansion of Manila seaports, shifting cargo-handling operations to the ports of Subic Bay and Batangas, and to eventually redevelop the port area into high value-added diversified waterfront area. However, the government has yet to implement the suggestion.

With Berth 6 in operation, ICTSI is scheduled to finish Phase 1 development of Yard 7 by yearend and increase MICT's import capacity by 18 percent.

South of Metro Manila, ICTSI's Laguna Gateway Inland Container Terminal (LGICT) has finished its Phase 1 development. The inland container depot (ICD), which serves as an extension of the MICT, adds 250,000 TEUs to MICT's annual capacity. It will be connected to Manila through the revival of the Manila-Calamba cargo intermodal system, which ceased operations in 2000 due to lower demand.

== Transportation and infrastructure connections ==
=== Buses ===
As of April 2025, there are no public transport buses plying reasonably near these areas. However some jeepneys coming from/along Intramuros, Manila City Hall, Carriedo, Doroteo Jose area can be observed instead. Also, Indian-style limited-space tricycles which could accommodate a maximum of five passengers could be also ridden from around Ermita-Malate area particularly from United Nations Avenue corner Taft Avenue, and along Mabini Street starting from around Quirino Avenue. Such are usually utilised by a portion of the commuting employees of government offices (Philippine Coast Guard, Department of Public Works and Highways, Philippine Ports Authority, Bureau of Customs) and private companies ( Manila Hotel, Asian Terminals, Inc., banks, food service establishments, customs brokerage & logistics firms ) around the area,

=== Access to/from the NLEX ===
The NLEX Harbor Link, an expressway that connects with the main line North Luzon Expressway (NLEX) at the Harbor Link Interchange in Valenzuela up to Radial Road 10 (R-10) in Navotas, serves as an alternative road to the Manila North Harbor especially for the cargo trucks entering the port coming from Northern and Central Luzon, without a truck ban, and also eases traffic congestion at Andres Bonifacio Avenue and 5th Avenue.

=== Future projects ===
==== Pier 4 LRT station ====
The Pier 4 station is the future western terminus of Manila Light Rail Transit System Line 2 (LRT-2). It will be constructed near the North Port Passenger Terminal located at Pier 4 of Manila North Harbor along Mel Lopez Boulevard. The west extension of LRT-2 will also serve as a rail transport connection to the Port of Manila.

==== North-South Harbor Bridge ====
The Department of Public Works and Highways (DPWH) is also proposing to construct a bridge crossing the Pasig River between North Harbor and South Harbor.

==== NLEX-CAVITEX Port Expressway Link / Harbor Link Port Access Mobility Facility ====
A proposed expressway in NLEX–CAVITEX Port Expressway Link or Harbor Link Port Access Mobility Facility is being planned to connect the existing Navotas Interchange of NLEX Harbor Link to Manila–Cavite Expressway (CAVITEX) or Anda Circle, respectively. It will run above the existing alignment of Mel Lopez Boulevard.

== See also ==
- Battle of Manila (1945)
- Naval Base Manila
- List of East Asian ports
- North Port Passenger Terminal
- Port Area, Manila
