= Port of Cagayan de Oro =

Port in Cagayan de Oro, Philippines

Port of Cagayan de Oro Daungan ng Cagayan de Oro
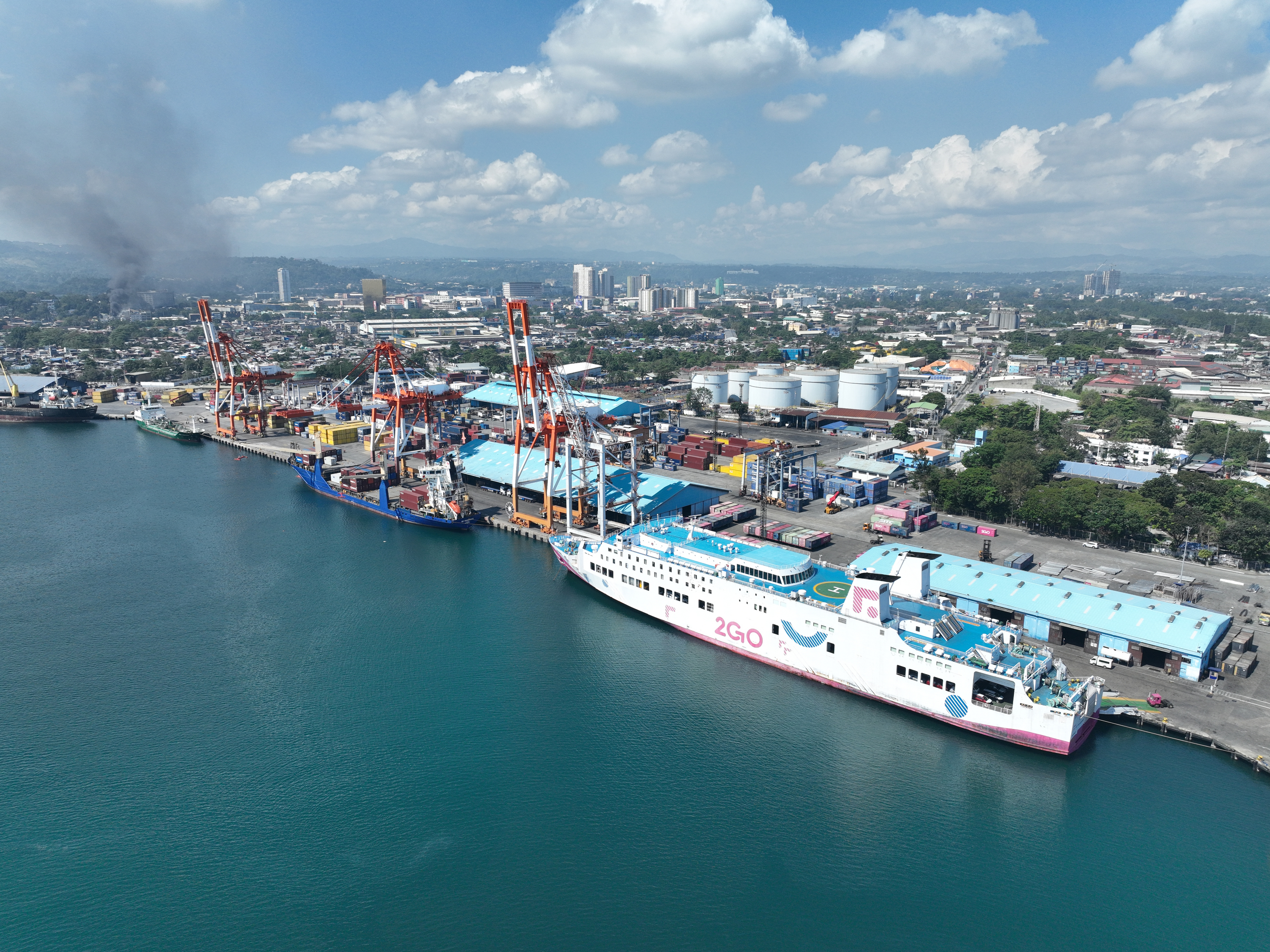
- Aerial view of the port in 2026.
- Interactive map of Port of Cagayan de Oro; Daungan ng Cagayan de Oro

Location
- Country: Philippines
- Location: Cagayan de Oro
- Coordinates: 8°29′38″N 124°39′44″E

Details
- Operated by: Philippine Ports Authority
- No. of berths: 16

Statistics
- Website http://www.pmocdo.ppa.com.ph/

The Port of Cagayan de Oro (Filipino: Daungan ng Cagayan de Oro, Cebuano: Pantalan sa Cagayan de Oro), also known as the Macabalan Port, is a seaport in Cagayan de Oro in the Philippines. It is the busiest seaport in Northern Mindanao as of 2019.

== History ==
The development of the present seaport of Cagayan de Oro started in 1977 with the locale previously served by a wooden seaport. On November 19, 2008, President Gloria Macapagal Arroyo issued Executive Order 769 declaring and delineating the Cagayan de Oro Port Zone under the administrative jurisdiction of the Philippine Ports Authority.

== Facilities ==
Photo gallery

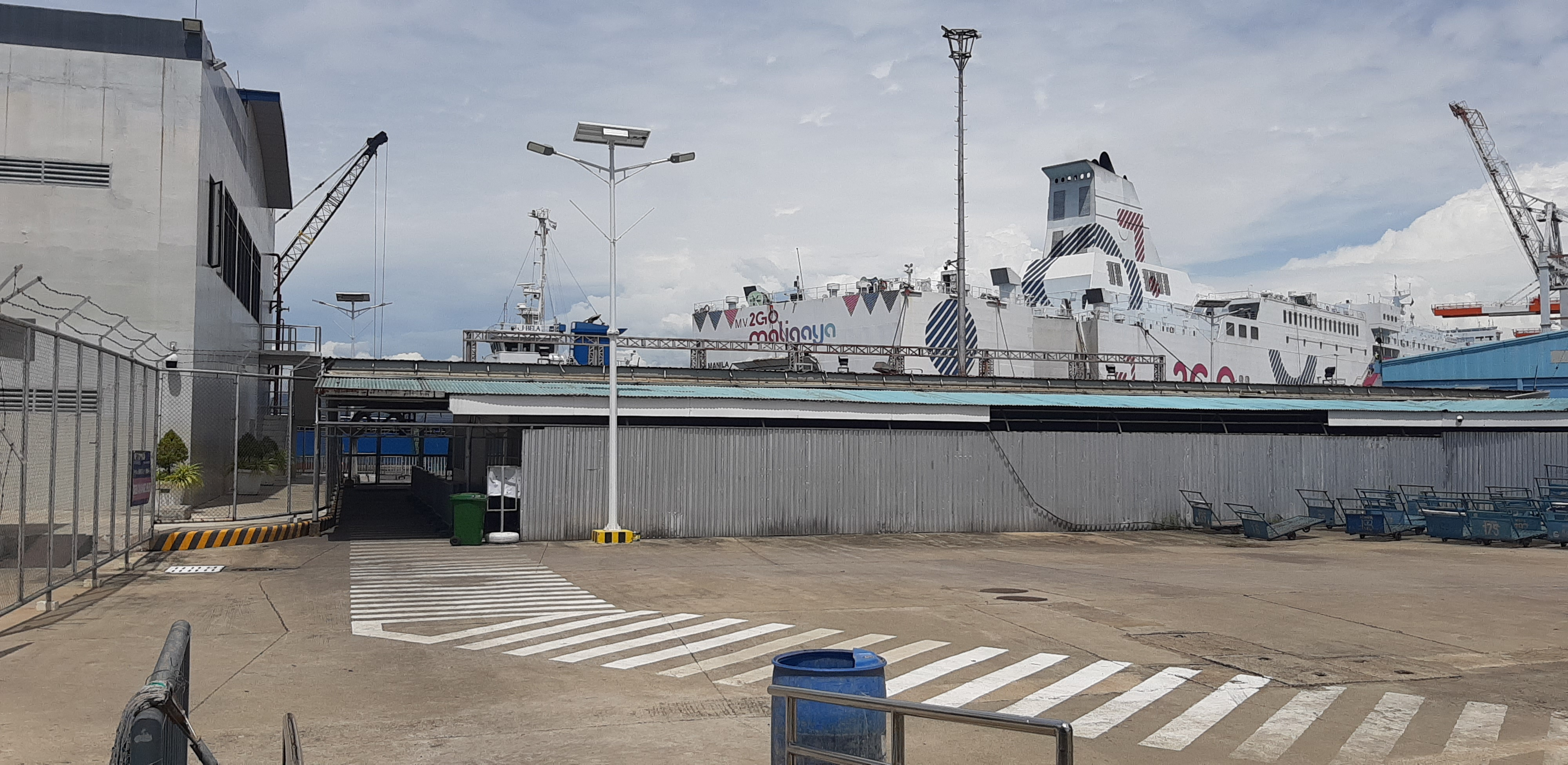
2GO Maligaya ferry at daytime

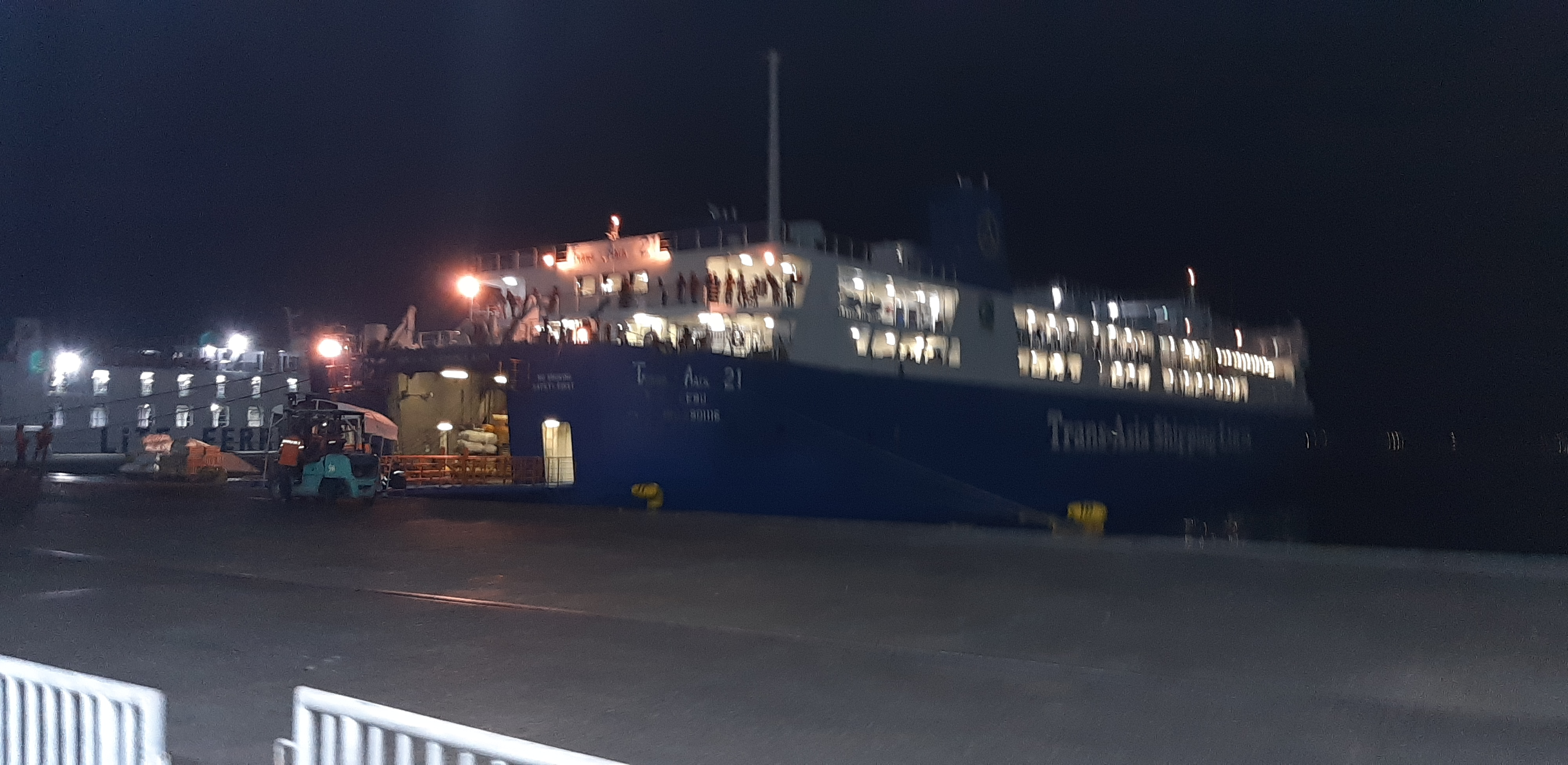
Ferry boats at nighttime

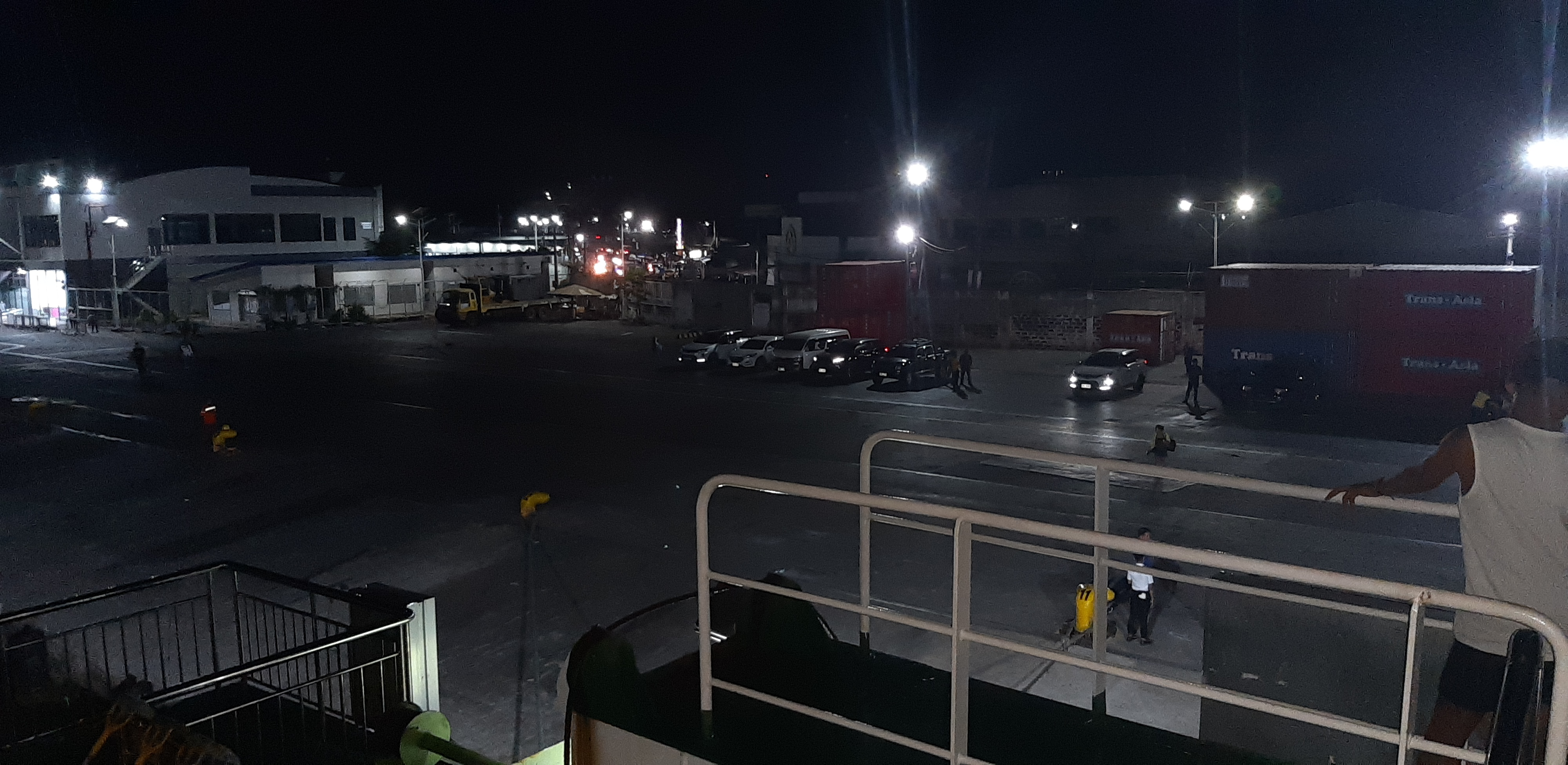
View of Port of CDO from the top of Lite Ferries boat boarding to Jagna, Bohol

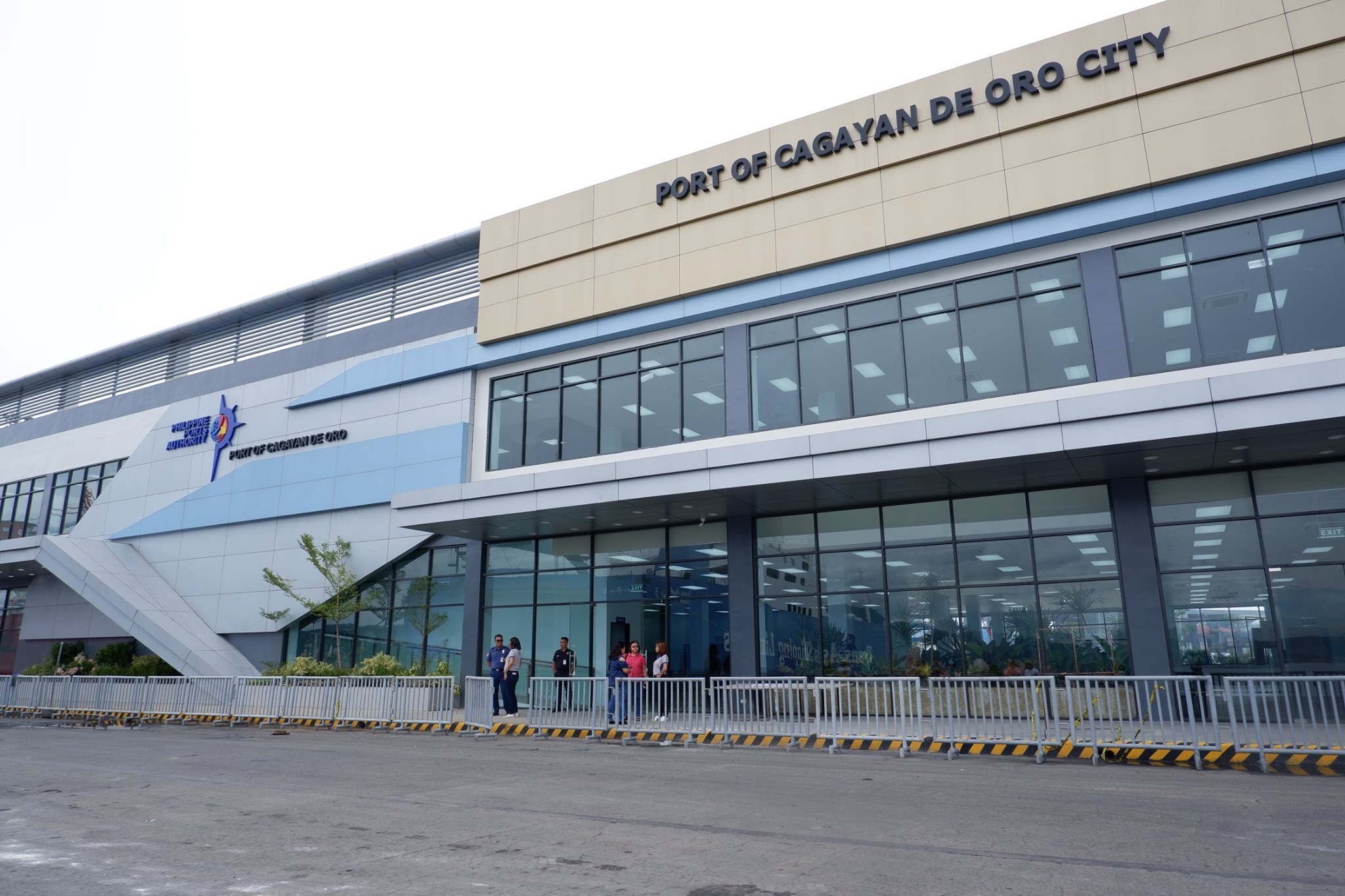
The passenger terminal

The Port of Cagayan de Oro is a major seaport of Northern Mindanao handling both cargo and passengers. It is situated along Macajalar Bay. The Cagayan de Oro Port Zone covers an area of 364 ha (900 acres), 28 ha (69 acres) of which is on land with the rest covering water.

Its passenger terminal is the biggest in the Philippines, with the capacity of 3,000 people. The terminal building has two-storeys and has a floor area of 5,597 m^{2} (60,250 sq ft).
