= North Port Passenger Terminal =

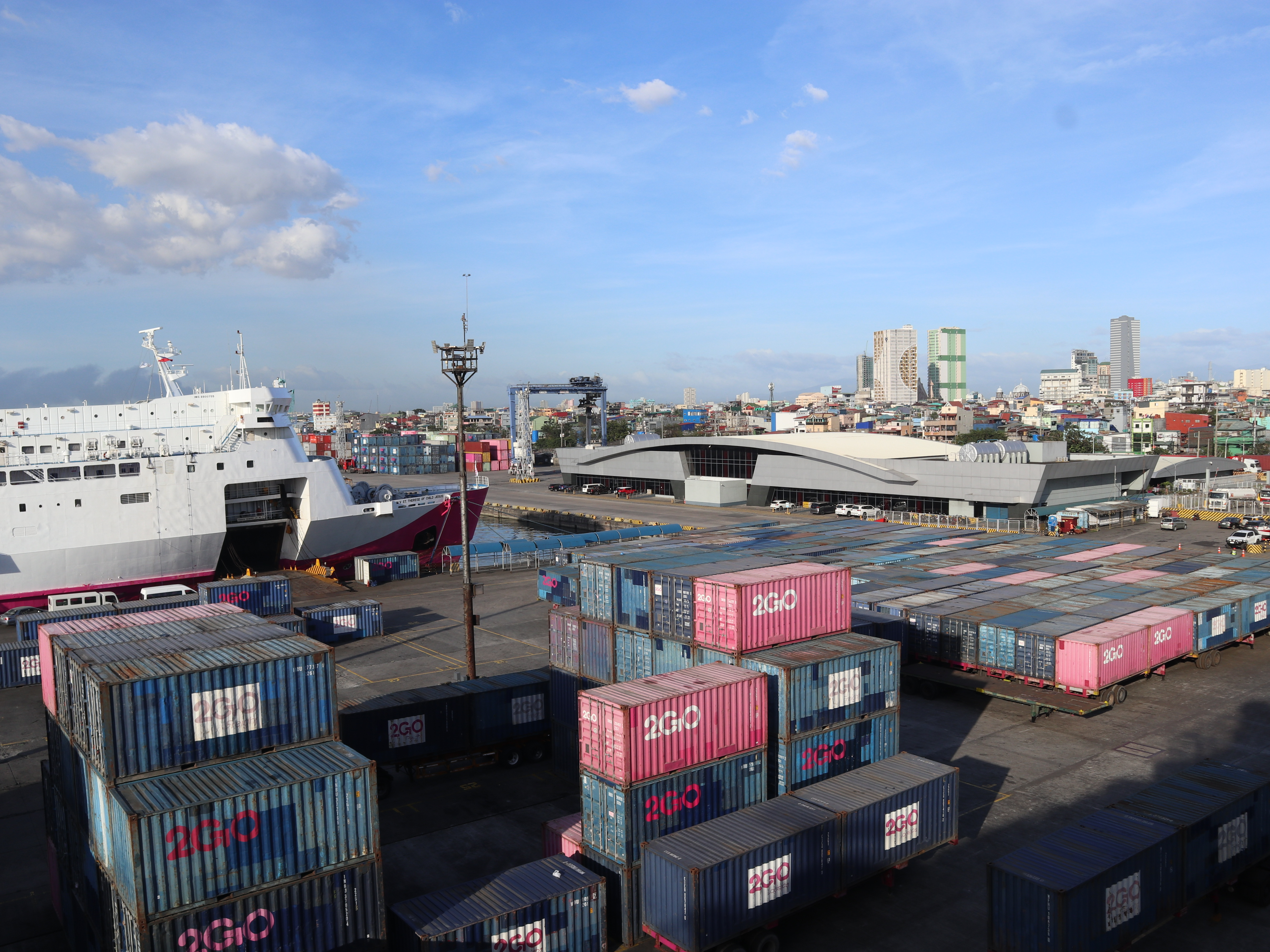
- Interactive map of the North Port Passenger Terminal area
- Alternative names: Terminal 2

General information
- Location: Manila North Harbor, Manila, Pier 4, Manila North Harbor, Tondo, Manila, Philippines 1012, Philippines
- Coordinates: 14°36′10.22″N 120°57′38.48″E
- Groundbreaking: June 11, 2012
- Opened: May 10, 2013 (partial); October 9, 2013 (official)
- Cost: PHP 200 million peso
- Owner: 65% Harbour Centre Port Holdings Inc; 35% Petron Corporation

Technical details
- Floor area: 11,600 m^{2}

Design and construction
- Main contractor: Manila North Harbour Port Inc.

Other information
- Seating capacity: 1,875 seats
- Parking: 2,000 m^{2}

Website
- http://www.mnhport.com.ph/

North Port Passenger Terminal (also known as Terminal 2) is a terminal for passenger ferries, roll-on/roll-off ferries (RORO), and cruise ships located on Pier 4, Manila North Harbor, Port of Manila, Philippines. It is owned by Manila North Harbour Port Inc. and opened on October 9, 2013.

The terminal can accommodate 2-3 million passengers per year, greater than the old terminal, which can accommodate about 1.5 million passengers.

The terminal has a total area of about 12,000 square metres (130,000 sq ft), including the main building, drop-off area, ticketing booths, and a 2,000 square metres (22,000 sq ft) parking area. It features an X-ray scanning area and a luggage check-in area and has about 2,000 seating capacity. It can handle five vessels at any time.

On November 2, 2013, MV SuperStar Aquarius, a 51,300 gross tonner of Star Cruises, arrived at the terminal. On January 9, 2014, MV Costa Victoria of Costa Cruises, carrying 1,775 passengers, made its maiden call at the terminal.
