= Ali Macalintal =

Filipino human rights activist

- Born: 1985 or 1986
- Died: June 23, 2025 (aged 39); General Santos, Philippines
- Occupations: Humans rights activist; radio journalist
- Employer: Radio Philippines Network; Radyo Bandera
- Organization: Bagong Alyansang Makabayan; Karapatan

Ali Jejhon "Toti" Macalintal (1985/1986–June 23, 2025) was a Filipino human rights activist and radio journalist. Macalintal first came to public attention in 2002 when she was arrested and wrongfully convicted alongside two others in relation to the Fitmart Mall bombing, which killed 15 people. Macalintal and her co-defendants became known as the GenSan Three, and following public pressure, the three were acquitted of all charges in 2010 after eight years of imprisonment. Macalintal went on to play an organisational role in human rights organisations including Karapatan and Bagong Alyansang Makabayan and became known for her activism in respect of LGBTQ, Moro and indigenous communities on Mindanao. From 2019, Macalintal worked as a broadcaster on various radio stations in General Santos, where she was shot and killed in June 2025 by an unknown assailant.

== Education ==
Ali Macalintal studied mass communication at Ramon Magsasay Memorial College in General Santos.

== Background ==
=== Implication in the 2002 Fitmart Mall bombing ===
==== 2002 arrest and trial ====
On April 21, 2002, a bombing occurred at the Fitmart Mall in General Santos, resulting in the deaths of 15 people. On April 24, a police raid occurred at Purok Lote, Barangay Calumpang, General Santos, in which three Moro members of Bayan Muna, a leftist political party, were arrested. The police stated that the address had been traced following a phone call made by Macalintal on one of the other defendant's mobile phone to Bayan Telecommunications on April 23, alleging that there were bombs surrounding its office building. Macalintal acknowledged having made the phone call but stated that she had done so after she was held at gunpoint by multiple unknown assailants. On June 18, 2002, Macalintal and her co-defendants were charged with possessing illegal explosives in breach of Presidential Decree 1866.

==== 2010 retrial and acquittal ====
In the years following the trial, Macalintal and her co-defendants became known as the GenSan Three, with activists raising concerns that they had been the victims of red-tagging by government authorities due to their membership of Bayan Muna which the government had deemed to be sympathetic to the cause of the New People's Army, the armed wing of the Communist Party of the Philippines. In 2010, after eight years of detainment, Macalintal and her co-defendants were acquitted of all charges by the Regional Trial Court in General Santos, which found the evidence against them "inadmissible" and the case against them "a straightforward violation of due process", with it being found that evidence had been "planted" on Macalintal and her co-defendants following an illegal police raid.

Macalintal subsequently reported that she had been tortured and mistreated while in state custody. The Asian Human Rights Commission, while praising the outcome of the retrial, called on authorities to investigate Bartolome Balayut, the former police director of Soccsksargen, for the illegal arrest and torture of the GenSan Three, in addition to planting false evidence.

=== Post-release and activism ===
Following her release from prison, Macalintal became known for her activism on behalf of the LGBTQ community, particularly on her home island of Mindanao. In addition, she also advocated publicly for the rights of Moros, the Muslim population of the Philippines, and indigenous communities in Mindanao. Between 2016 and 2018, she served as the deputy secretary-general of the human right organisation Karapatan's General Santos chapter, as well as working as a media liaison officer for the leftist political coalition Bagong Alyansang Makabayan. As part of her work with Karapatan, Macalintal took part in several fact finding missions on Mindanao after Proclamation No. 216 was made by then-President of the Philippines, Rodrigo Duterte in 2017, establishing martial law on the island. Also in 2017, Macalintal took part in the annual Lakbayan ng Pambansang Minorya march in solidarity with the Moro and Lumad communities.

From 2019, Macalintal began working as a radio broadcaster, hosting shows focusing on community issues for General Santos-based radio stations including Radio Philippines Network XDXF until 2023, and Radyo Bandera News FM.

== Killing and response ==
At around 07:00 (UTC+8) on June 23, 2025, Macalintal was shot three times in the abdomen by a hooded gunman at a spa in Barangay Lagao, General Santos. The gunman subsequently fled the scene on a motorbike. Macalintal, who had been at the spa to provide accupuncture, was taken to a local hospital, where she was declared dead. The local police stated whether the shooting was linked to her human rights activism, her links with leftist political parties, her former broadcasting work with RPN and Bandera News, or recent business ventures she had made concerning her beauty business.

Macalintal's death attracted attention from national and international human rights organisations, who noted her links to human rights organisations and local media, as well as her status as a transgender woman, as potential motives for her killing.

The human rights organisation Karpatan, for whom Macalintal had previously worked, released a statement alleging that Macalintal had told them in 2024 that she was being harassed by members of Task Force Gensan, a security force associated with the Armed Forces of the Philippines based in General Santos, including them visiting the homes of her neighbour and cousin to query her whereabouts. Human Rights Watch stated it had seen confirmed proof that in 2019 Macalintal had been sent a draft press release stating she had been shot to death, in a form of state intimidation, and called on Philippine President Bongbong Marcos, to demonstrate his commitment to human rights by ensuring justice for Macalintal and other victims of human rights abuses.

The Filipino LGBTQ rights group Bahaghari Philippines released a statement commemorating Macalintal, describing her as "never afraid to speak truth to power and expose uncomfortable truths".

The Commission on Human Rights condemned the killings of Macalintal as well as Gian Molina, another transgender woman whose body had been found on the same day as Macalintal's killing in the Cagayan River. It urged the authorities to make swift and impartial probes, to hold the perpetrators' accountable, and to respect the women's gender identities in official records. It also urged the Congress of the Philippines to pass the SOGIESC Equality Bill and the Comprehensive Anti-Discrimination Bill to enshrine LGBTQ rights under Filipino law. ASEAN Parliamentarians for Human Rights "strongly condemned" Macalintal's murder.

Amnesty International Philippines noted that Macalintal's killing occurred during Pride Month, as well as days after the United Nations Special Rapporteur on Freedom of Opinion and Expression presented her final report on the Philippines which found that attacks on journalists and slow investigations into crimes committed against them had continued under the Marcos presidency. The Presidential Task Force on Media Security pledged a "thorough enquiry" with local police to investigate if there were any links between Macalintal's killing and her media work.
