= Ramon Magsaysay Memorial Colleges =

Private college in General Santos and Koronadal, Philippines

- Other names: RMMC; RMMC-GSC; RMMC-IS; RMMC-MI
- Former names: Mindanao Vocational School (MVS); Magsaysay Memorial Colleges (MMC)
- Motto: Passion for Excellence. Commitment to Service.
- Type: Private University; Private School
- Established: 1957-present
- Founders: Atty. Eugenio M. Millado; Doña Aurora G. Millado
- Parent institution: Millado Foundation
- Accreditation: PACUCOA
- President: Kristoffer Franz Mari R. Millado, MA, EdD (RMMC - General Santos City); Ma. Patricia Andrea Manilay-Millado, MBA, MA, MPMA (RMMC - Koronadal City)
- Colors
- Nicknames: RMMC Bluefins (General Santos City); RMMC Blue Phoenix (Koronadal City)
- Sporting affiliations: PRISAA

Ramon Magsaysay Memorial Colleges, also known by its acronym RMMC, is a private, non-stock, non-profit, co-educational, and non-sectarian educational institution in the Philippines. It operates multiple campuses located in General Santos City and Koronadal City (also known as Marbel), serving as a key academic and cultural center in the SOCCSKSARGEN region of Mindanao.

== History ==
Ramon Magsaysay Memorial Colleges originated with the founding of the Mindanao Vocational School (MVS) in 1957 by Atty. Eugenio M. Millado and his wife, Doña Aurora Garcia-Millado.

In 1960, the institution received official recognition from the Philippine government and was granted college status. It was subsequently renamed Magsaysay Memorial Colleges (MMC) in honor of the late President Ramon Magsaysay. During its early years, MMC expanded regionally through the establishment of satellite campuses in Cotabato and Sultan Kudarat, reflecting its commitment to providing educational access to underserved communities.

Following the death of Atty. Millado in 1978, leadership passed to his only son, Florante G. Millado. To further strengthen the institution’s identity, he obtained formal consent from Mrs. Luz Magsaysay, widow of President Ramon Magsaysay, to adopt the name Ramon Magsaysay Memorial Colleges (RMMC). The renaming reinforced the institution’s dedication to the principles of public service, integrity, and nation-building. Under his leadership, RMMC expanded its academic programs and enhanced its infrastructure. Notable developments included the acquisition and integration of Southern Island Colleges (SIC) into the RMMC system and the acquisition of the Bernabe Coliseum, which served as a venue for cultural and institutional activities before being divested in a later strategic realignment.

After the passing of Florante G. Millado in 1992, institutional leadership transitioned to his wife, Elda Regner-Millado, along with their four children. Under their stewardship, RMMC continued to broaden its academic offerings, modernize its operations, and strengthen its reputation for educational excellence.

== Recent Developments ==
In 2008, Ramon Magsaysay Memorial Colleges expanded its institutional presence with the establishment of a campus in Koronadal City, the capital of South Cotabato. This campus was officially designated as Ramon Magsaysay Memorial Colleges – Marbel (RMMC–MI).

In 2017, RMMC furthered its expansion with the opening of a new RMMC–MI Campus in Koronadal City, reinforcing its institutional presence in the province.

In 2018, the institution enhanced its academic infrastructure with the completion of a dedicated campus for basic and secondary education, known as the Ramon Magsaysay Memorial Colleges – Integrated School (RMMC–IS), located in General Santos City.

In 2025, Ramon Magsaysay Memorial Colleges entered into an international academic partnership by signing a Memorandum of Understanding (MOU) with Sunway University in Malaysia to promote global learning, cross-cultural student exchanges, and collaborative research.

== Academics and Accreditations ==
Ramon Magsaysay Memorial Colleges offers a comprehensive range of academic programs across basic education, secondary education, and tertiary education. Several of its academic offerings have been granted accreditation by the Philippine Association of Colleges and Universities Commission on Accreditation (PACUCOA). The institution operates in accordance with national academic policies and regulatory standards established by the Department of Education (DepEd) and the Commission on Higher Education (CHED).

In addition, RMMC provides technical-vocational education and training (TVET) programs under the supervision of the Technical Education and Skills Development Authority (TESDA). The college also implements the Expanded Tertiary Education Equivalency and Accreditation Program (ETEEAP), offering alternative pathways to higher education for qualified individuals.

== Student Life ==
=== Performing Arts ===
Ramon Magsaysay Memorial Colleges has performing arts tradition, with several student-led cultural and artistic groups active on campus culture. These include Teatro Ambahanon, Indak, which specializes in contemporary and cultural dance, the Sinig-laya Folkloric and Rondalla Dance Troupe, and the Bughaw Folkloric Dance Troupe. Vocal ensembles such as the Himig Chorale and the Lingen Chorale. The Helobung Scholars focus on indigenous culture and traditional arts.

The institution serves as a regional partner of the Kaisa Sa Sining (KSS) program of the Cultural Center of the Philippines (CCP) and is a member of the CCP Arts Education Network, underscoring its active participation in national cultural development and arts-based education initiatives.

=== Arts Festival ===
RMMC annually hosts Pasigarbo, a campus-wide arts festival featuring workshops, performances, exhibitions, and interdisciplinary collaborations in the creative arts. The festival provides a platform for students, faculty, and regional artists to showcase diverse artistic expressions. It is part of the broader celebration of Philippine arts and culture, supported by the National Commission for Culture and the Arts (NCCA).

=== Athletics ===
Its official varsity teams, the Bluefins (General Santos City) and the Blue Phoenix (Koronadal City), compete in a variety of intercollegiate sports events. The college regularly participates in regional and national competitions organized by the Private Schools Athletic Association (PRISAA). RMMC is also affiliated with the Bahia Del Sur Football Academy, providing structured football training and grassroots development programs for young student-athletes.

== Partnerships ==
=== Academic Linkages ===
Ramon Magsaysay Memorial Colleges has built partnerships to enhance curriculum development, international benchmarking, and mobility programs with institutions across several countries, including Indonesia, Malaysia, Japan, South Korea, the United Arab Emirates, France, the United Kingdom, and the United States of America.

=== Healthcare Affiliations ===
RMMC has forged strategic relationships with leading regional healthcare institutions, notably St. Elizabeth Hospital (SEHI) and Mindanao Medical Center (MMC).

== Recognition and Rankings ==
=== World Universities Ranking for Innovation ===
Ramon Magsaysay Memorial Colleges gained international recognition by debuting in the World Universities Ranking for Innovation (WURI) 2025, an influential global platform that evaluates higher education institutions based on their innovative approaches, real-world impact, and community engagement.

RMMC was ranked 234th among the Global Top 400 Most Innovative Universities, marking a significant milestone as a new entrant on the list. Additionally, the institution secured top 100 placements in several WURI innovation categories, including Ethics and Integrity (Rank 69), and Cultures and Values (Rank 92).

=== AppliedHE ===
Ramon Magsaysay Memorial Colleges was recognized in the AppliedHE Private University Rankings 2026. The institution was ranked 114th among ASEAN private universities and placed within the 221–240 bracket among private universities across Asia.

== Diplomatic Engagements ==
Ramon Magsaysay Memorial Colleges joined in an official visit to Rabdan Academy in Abu Dhabi, led by Philippine Ambassador to the United Arab Emirates, Alfonso A. Ver. The visit was part of a broader initiative to strengthen bilateral cooperation in the fields of safety, security, defence, emergency preparedness, and crisis management (SSDEC). Ambassador Ver was welcomed by H.E. Salem Saeed Al Saeedi, Vice President of Rabdan Academy, alongside senior academic officials.

== Social Responsibility and Community Engagement ==
=== Kalilangan Festival ===
The Kalilangan Festival is an annual celebration commemorating the founding anniversary of General Santos City. In 2015, Ramon Magsaysay Memorial Colleges played a key role in launching the 26th Kalilangan Festival, which carried the themed "Ano Ang K Mo?". The tagline encouraged reflection on the core values shaping the city’s identity, with the letter "K" representing Kapayapaan (peace), Kasaganaan (prosperity), and Kagandahan (beauty)—values deeply embedded in the cultural heritage of General Santos.

=== Access to Quality Education ===
RMMC is committed to expanding educational opportunities through its scholarship programs. One notable initiative is a partnership with Brig. Gen. Jimili Macaraeg, Regional Director of the SOCCSKSARGEN Police Office (PRO-12). This collaboration provides financial assistance to students from Geographically Isolated and Disadvantaged Areas (GIDAs), helping underprivileged families access higher education.

== Notable alumni ==
- Ali Macalintal

== See also ==
- Education in the Philippines
- Higher education in the Philippines
- List of colleges and universities in the Philippines
