= Port of General Santos =

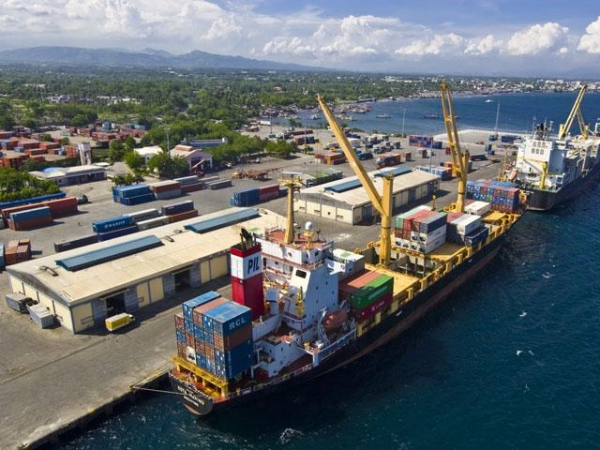

Location
- Country: Philippines
- Location: General Santos
- Coordinates: 6°05′39.8″N 125°09′27.1″E

Details
- Operated by: South Cotabato Integrated Port Services

The Port of General Santos (Filipino: Pantalan ng General Santos), also known as the Makar Port, is a seaport in General Santos in the Philippines.

The port is used to transport cargo in and out of General Santos, serving the wider Soccsksargen region. From 2008 until 2018, then from 2019 to 2024, the seaport did not serve domestic passenger services. Passenger services were briefly resumed in October 2018 with 2GO Travel serving Davao City, Zamboanga City, Iloilo City, and Manila for eight months. The company later resumed its Davao City route in 2021, but for cargo operations only. In 2024, 2GO restarted passenger operations, introducing routes from General Santos City to Davao City, Iloilo City, Manila, and later Cebu City. The Philippine Ports Authority is working to expand the seaport's passenger operations.

In September 2021, a new Port Operations Building (POB) complex for the seaport was inaugurated.
