= General Santos =

Highly urbanized city in Soccsksargen, Philippines

- Highly urbanized city
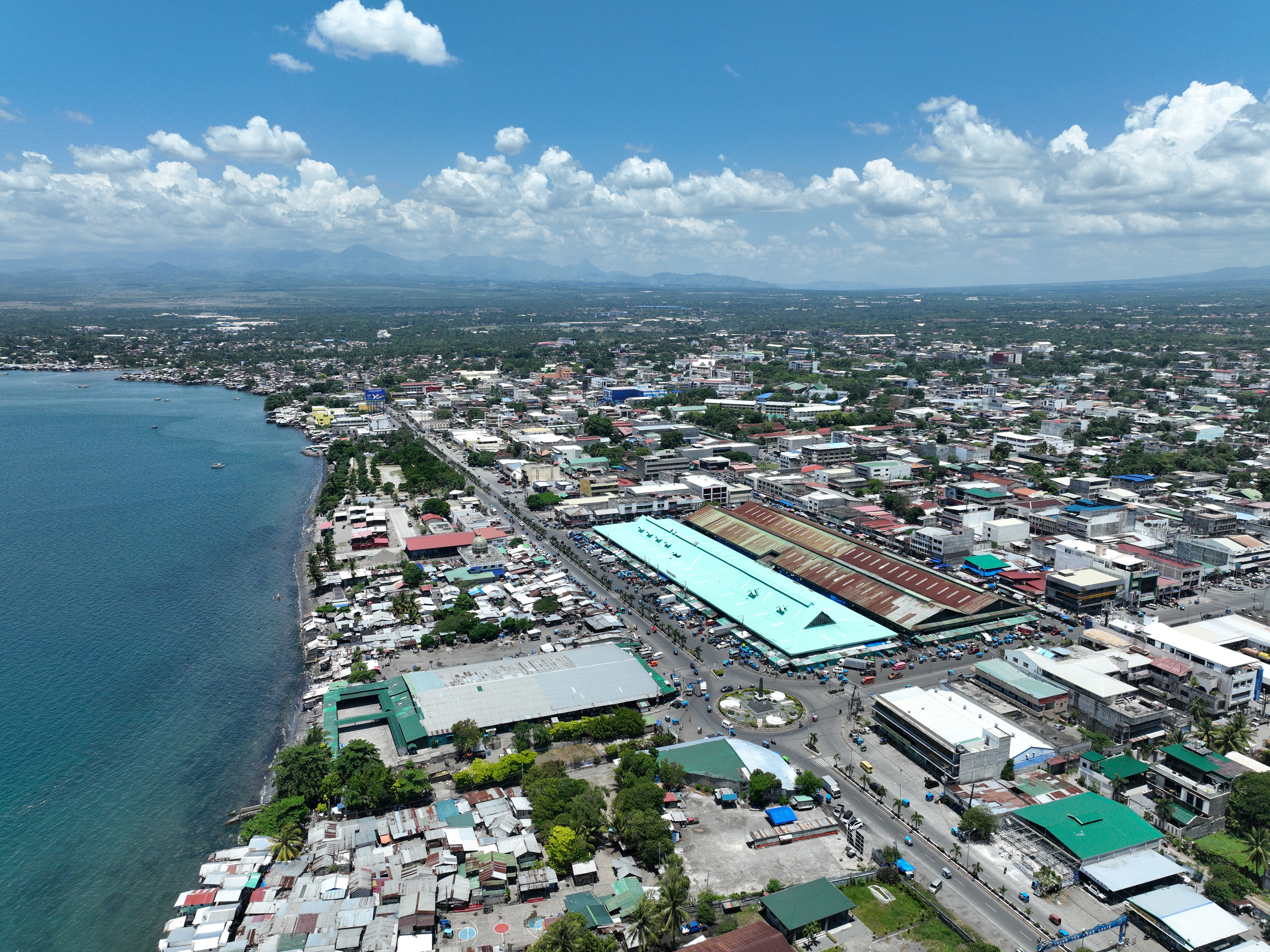
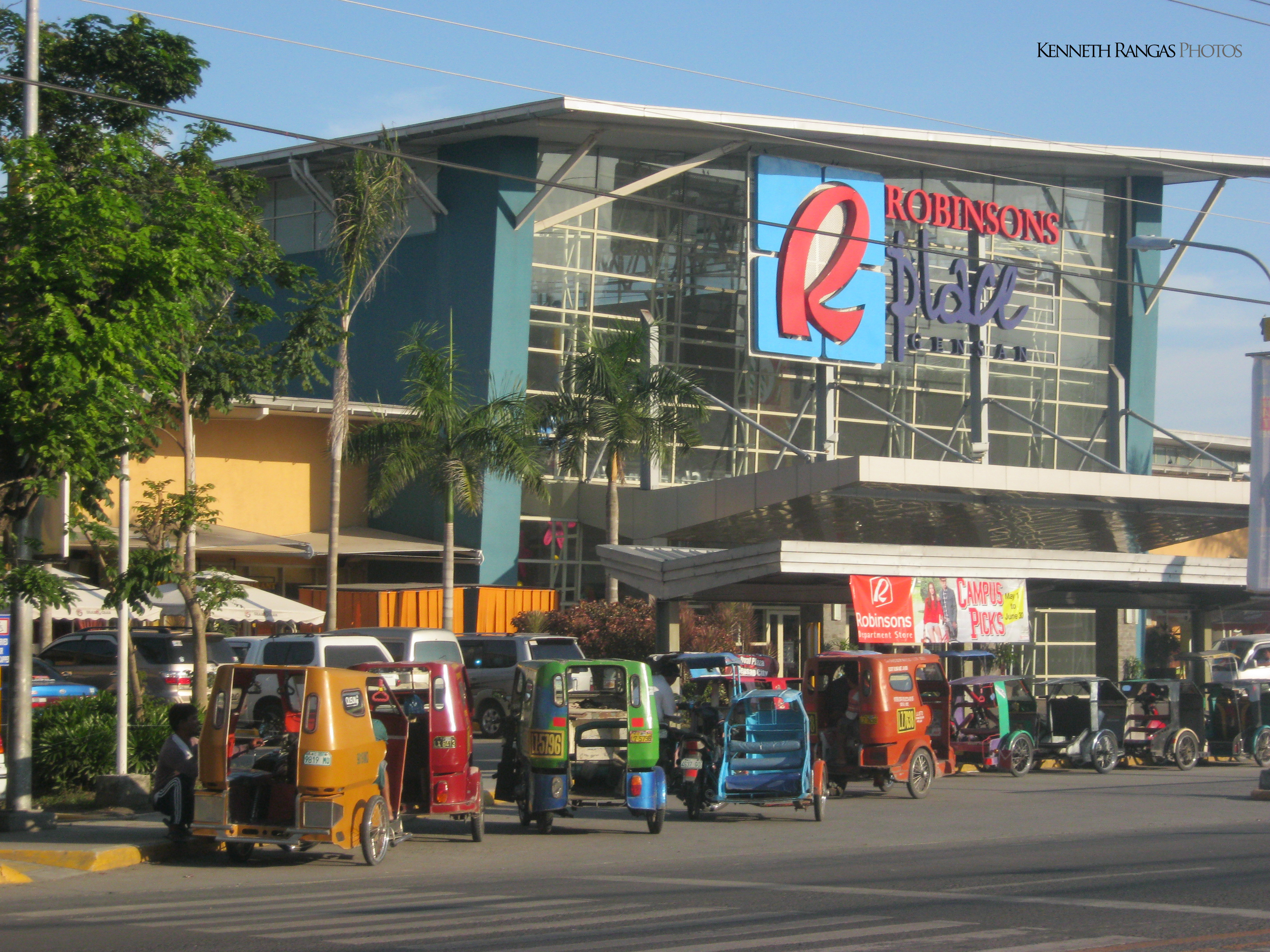
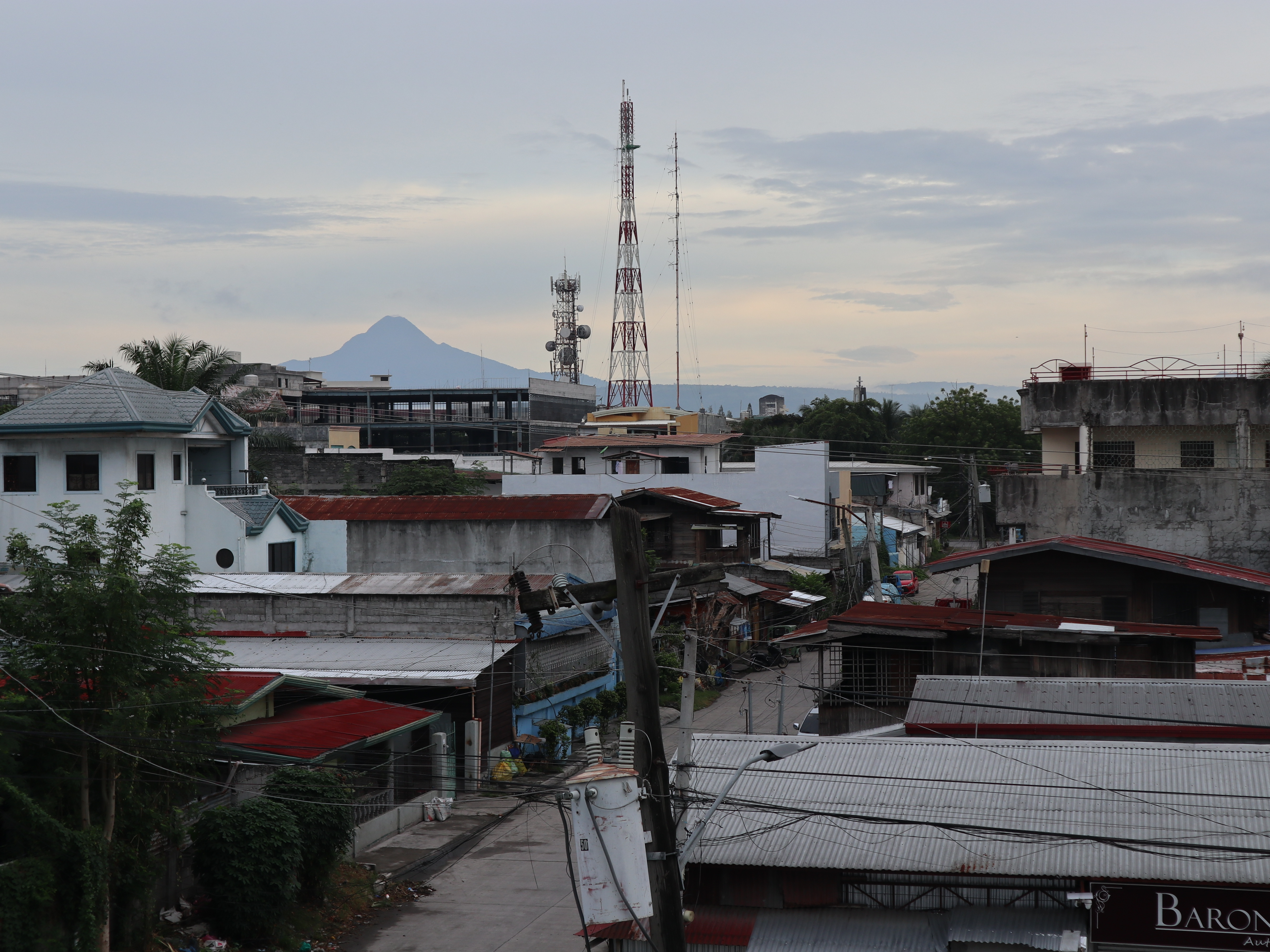
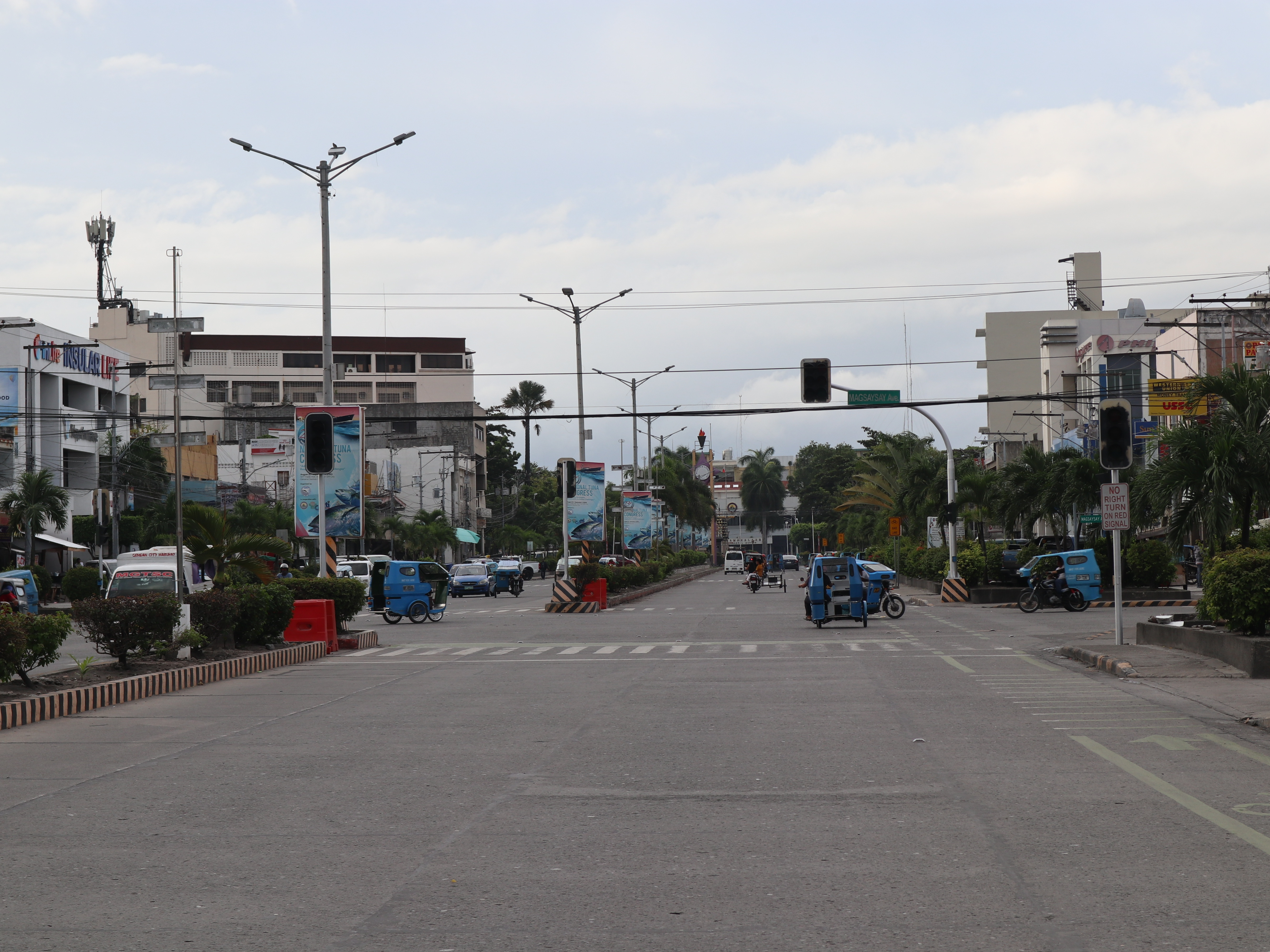
- From top, left to right: Aerial view of urban GenSan, Robinsons Place GenSan, Dadiangas skyline, and Pioneer Avenue

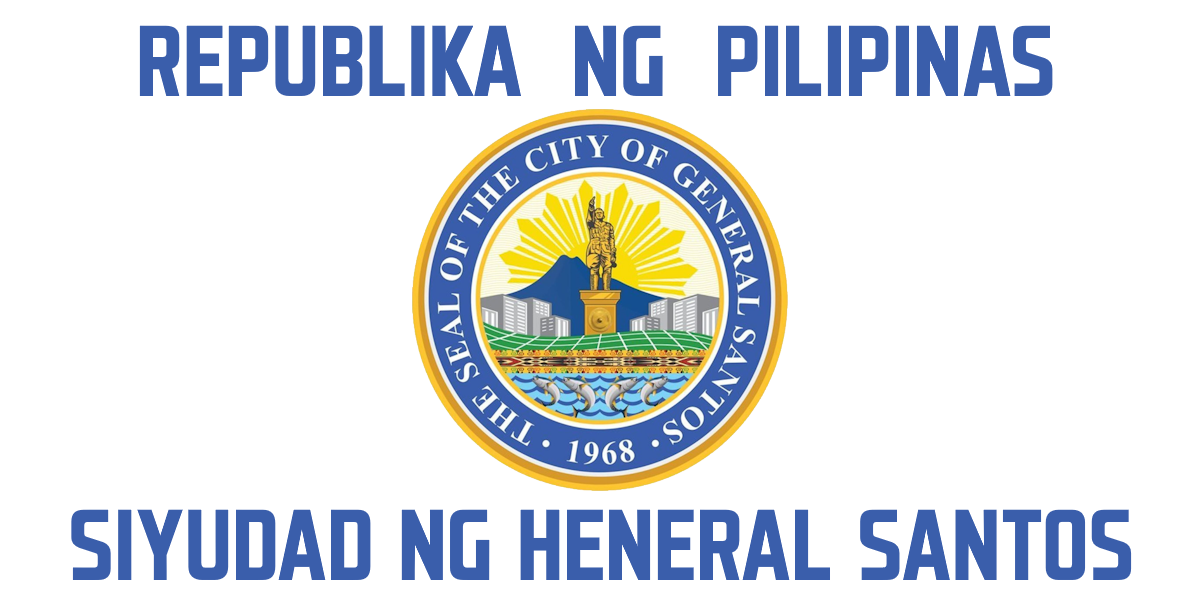
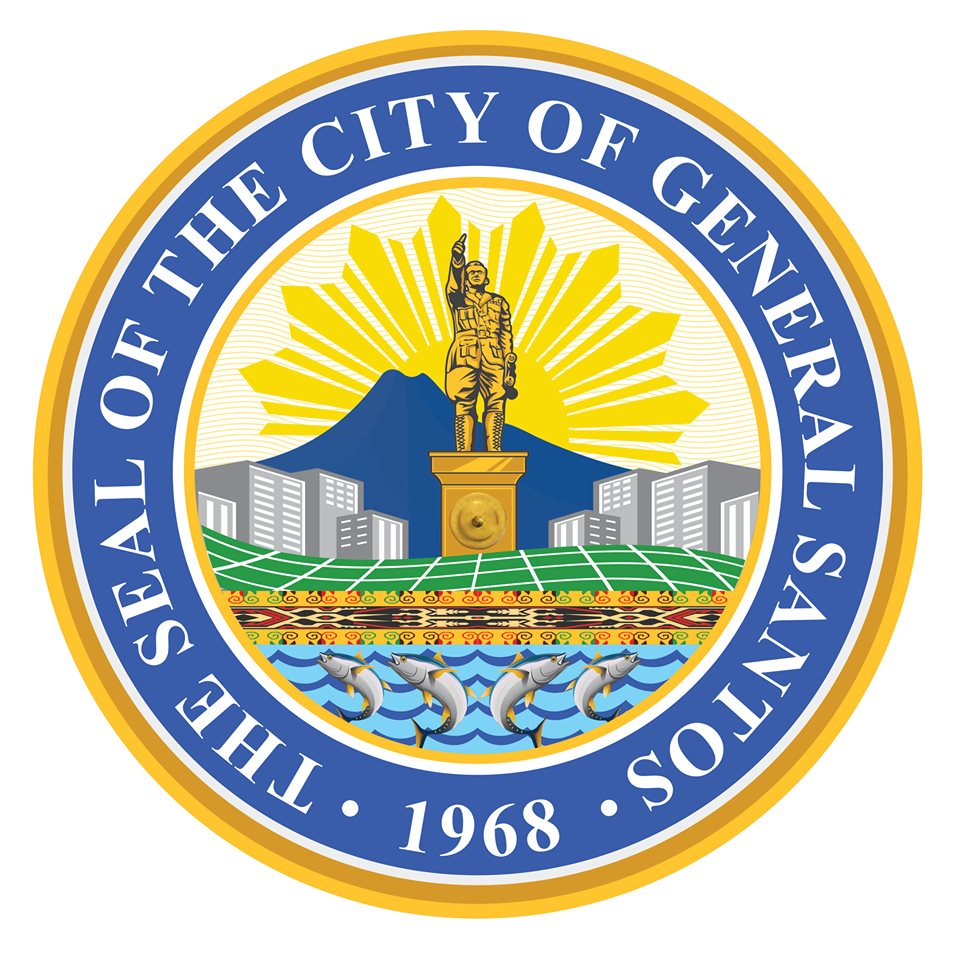
- Flag Seal
- Nickname: Tuna Capital of the Philippines
- Anthem: Himno ng Heneral Santos (English: General Santos Hymn)
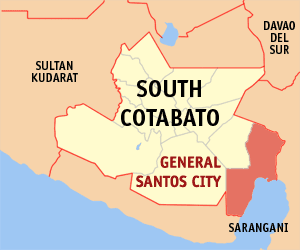
- Map of Soccsksargen with General Santos highlighted
- Interactive map of General Santos
- Location within the Philippines
- Coordinates: 6°07′N 125°10′E
- Country: Philippines
- Region: Soccsksargen
- Province: South Cotabato (only geographically)
- District: Lone District of General Santos
- Founded: October 29, 1903 (as Makar); August 18, 1947 (as Buayan)
- Renamed: June 15, 1954 (as General Santos)
- Granted cityhood status: July 8, 1968
- Declared as highly urbanized: September 5, 1988
- Named for: General Paulino Santos
- Barangays: 26 (see Barangays)

Government
  - Type: Sangguniang Panlungsod
  - Mayor: Lorelie G. Pacquiao (PCM)
  - Vice Mayor: Atty. Jose Edmar J. Yumang (RCRI)
  - Representative: Shirlyn L. Bañas-Nograles (PDP-Laban)
  - City Council: Members: Jonathan T. Blando; Cesar L. Bañas Jr.; Vivencio E. Dinopol; Elizabeth B. Bagonoc; Ralph Ronald J. Yumang; Franklin M. Gacal Jr.; Michael Stephen J. Pacquiao; Virginia T. Llido; Richard L. Atendido; Ramon R. Melliza; Dominador S. Lagare III; Jose Jacinto E. Dinopol
  - Electorate: 368,454 voters (2025)

Area
  - Total: 492.86 km^{2} (190.29 sq mi)
- Elevation: 197 m (646 ft)
- Highest elevation: 869 m (2,851 ft)
- Lowest elevation: 0 m (0 ft)

Population (2024 census)
  - Total: 722,059
  - Density: 1,465.0/km^{2} (3,794.4/sq mi)
  - Households: 175,345
- Demonym(s): General, Gensanon

Economy
  - Gross domestic product (GDP): ₱129.015 billion (2022) $2.279 billion (2022)
  - Income class: 1st city income class
  - Poverty incidence: 8.2% (2023)
  - Revenue: ₱ 3,960 million (2024)
  - Assets: ₱ 9,616 million (2024)
  - Expenditure: ₱ 3,800 million (2024)
  - Liabilities: ₱ 2,087 million (2024)

Service provider
  - Electricity: South Cotabato 2 Electric Cooperative (SOCOTECO 2)
- Time zone: UTC+8 (PST)
- ZIP code: 9500
- PSGC: 126303000
- IDD : area code: +63 (0)83
- Major languages: Sinugboanon, Hiligaynon, Mëgindënëwn, Blaan, Ilokano, Tagalog, Mëranaw
- Major religions: Roman Catholicism, Sunni Islam, Iglesia ni Cristo, Nondenominational, Seventh-day Adventist
- Website: www.gensantos.gov.ph

General Santos, officially the City of General Santos (Note: Sinugboanon: Dakbayan sa Heneral Santos Hiligaynon: Dakbanwa sang Heneral Santos Mëgindënëwn: (Bandal a) Inged nu Hiniral Santus Blaan: (Bong) Banwé Hénéral Santos Tagalog: Siyudad ng Heneral Santos Ilokano: Siudad ti Heneral Santos Mëranaw: Bandar a Heneral Santos Filipino: Lungsod ng Heneral Santos) and abbreviated as GenSan, is a highly urbanized city in the Soccsksargen region of the Philippines. It has a population of 722,059 people according to the 2024 census, making it the most populous city in Soccsksargen Region.

It is located on the island of Mindanao, and is the southernmost and 13th-most populous city in the Philippines. It is the regional center for commerce and industry in the Soccsksargen region. It is the largest and the only coastal city in the province of South Cotabato wherein it is geographically situated and grouped under the province by the Philippine Statistics Authority but administered independently of it.

General Santos was severely affected by the 2026 Mindanao earthquake.

== Etymology ==
The city was named after General Paulino Santos, a commanding general of the Philippine Army and the settlement's leading pioneer.

== History ==
The nomadic Blaan people are the original inhabitants of present-day General Santos, and traces of their early settlements of the area are found in the city's place names, which are derived from their vocabulary. Their name for the city, Dadiangas, is from the Ziziphus spina-christi tree that was once abundant in the area and is now a protected species under Republic Act 8371 or the Indigenous Peoples Right Act of 2007. The Blaan now lives alongside the city's new generation of settlers and other immigrants.

Beforehand, the Blaan would have been forced upland into the surrounding hills after the Muslims settled in the area under the rule of the Sultanate of Maguindanao.

After the fall of Maguindanao, Datu Uto of Buayan expanded his domain south towards Sarangani Bay. Dadiangas remained as a port under the Sultanate of Buayan until the Spanish conquered the Sarangani Bay area by the end of the 19th century.

=== Spanish and American colonial period ===
In 1898, by the end of Spanish colonial rule in the Philippines, two brothers hailing from Barcelona, Spain, Jose and Alberto Olarte, settled in Makar, now known as Brgy. Labangal. On October 29, 1903, the Municipality of Makar was officially established under the American Insular Government Act No. 21 Section 4. Nearly eleven years later on July 23, 1914, the Municipal District of Buayan was situated in what is now Brgy. Buayan was established. Makar formed what would later become the western part of General Santos, while Buayan consisted of its eastern part.

In 1924, the Provincial Board Resolution No. 8 proposed by the provincial government of Cotabato declared the creation of a settlement with an area of 300 hectares which will serve as the market settlement for agricultural products coming from Allah Valley and areas situated south of Lake Buluan. Makar was included in the proposed 300-hectare townsite area which was divided into three areas. The proposal was submitted to Governor-General Henry L. Stimson in 1928. However, for reasons unknown, only one area was approved for the said proposed market town, which happened to be an area which is a flat plain dotted by evergreen trees now eponymously known as Dadiangas, which would instead serve as the nucleus of General Santos as a city for the years to come.

=== Commonwealth period ===
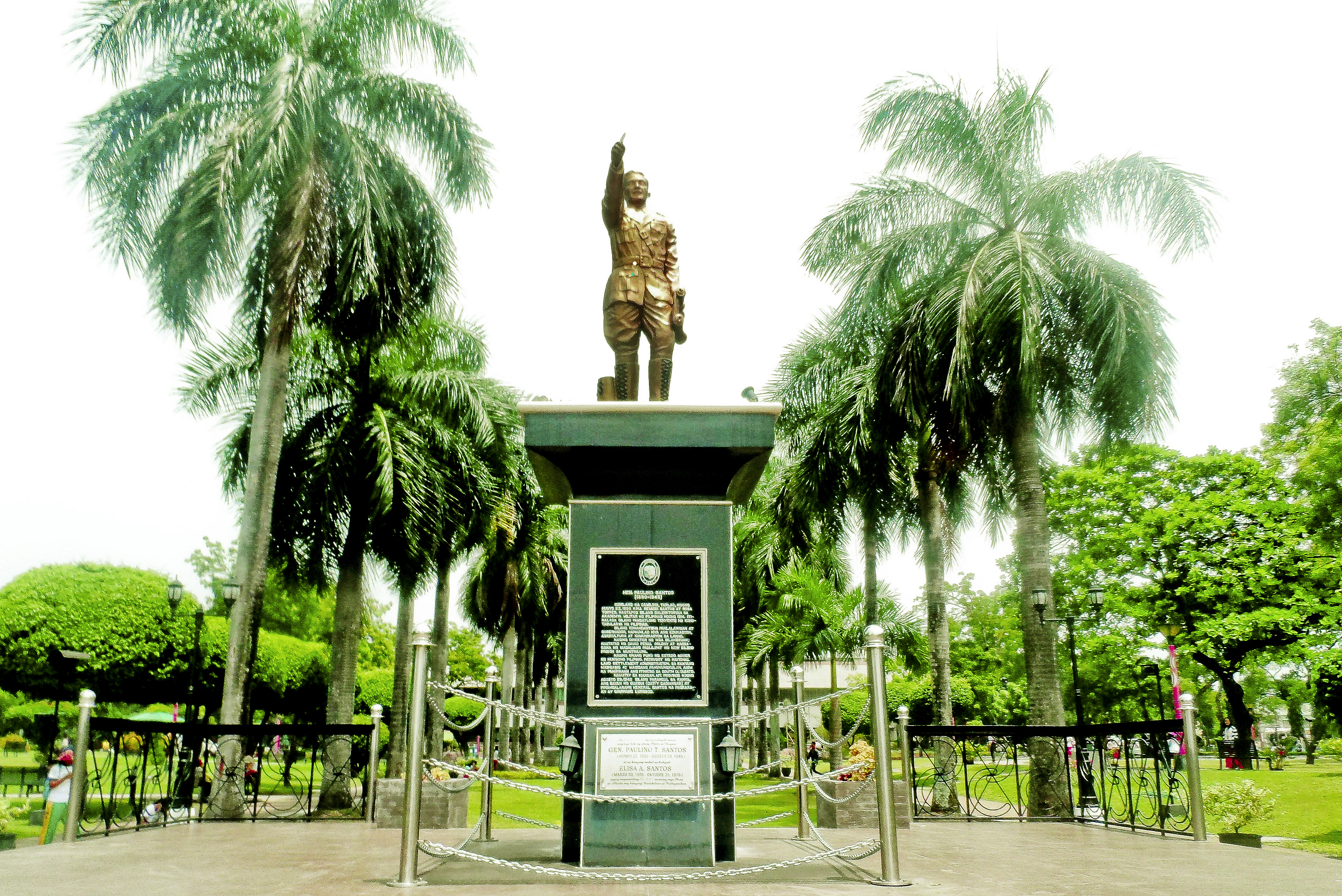
Statue of General Paulino Santos, for whom the city is named

Organized under the National Land Settlement Administration (NLSA) of the Commonwealth Government headed by President Manuel L. Quezon, General Paulino Santos led the relocation of 62 Christian settlers from Luzon to the shores of Sarangani Bay aboard the steam ship "Basilan" of the Compañía Marítima on February 27, 1939. The 62 pioneers, mostly agricultural and trade graduates, were the first large batch of settlers to land in the area with the mission to industriously cultivate the region. After this first influx of pioneers, more Christians from Visayas and Luzon subsequently migrated into the area, gradually driving some of the Blaan residents to the hills and mountains, where they have lost their livelihood and somewhat displaced Maguindanaon living in the area.

In March 1939, the first formal settlement in the city was established in Alagao, which is now known as Barangay Lagao. Lagao was known then as the "Municipal District of Buayan" under the jurisdiction of the deputy governor of the Municipal District of Glan, until it officially became an independent municipal district of Buayan on October 1, 1940, appointing Datu Sharif Zainal Abedin, an Arab mestizo married to a daughter of a very influential datu of lower Buayan, as the first district municipal mayor.

=== Second World War ===
During World War II, the Municipal District of Buayan became one of the last frontiers between the combined American and Filipino forces and troops from the Empire of Japan. Retreating Imperial Japanese forces made Klaja Karsts Land their last ground for defence, constructing round cement bunkers and tunnels. These bunkers can still be seen at Sitio Guadalupe; most of the tunnels, however, have since been damaged and even destroyed by treasure hunters and land developers.

=== Renaming and elevation to city status ===
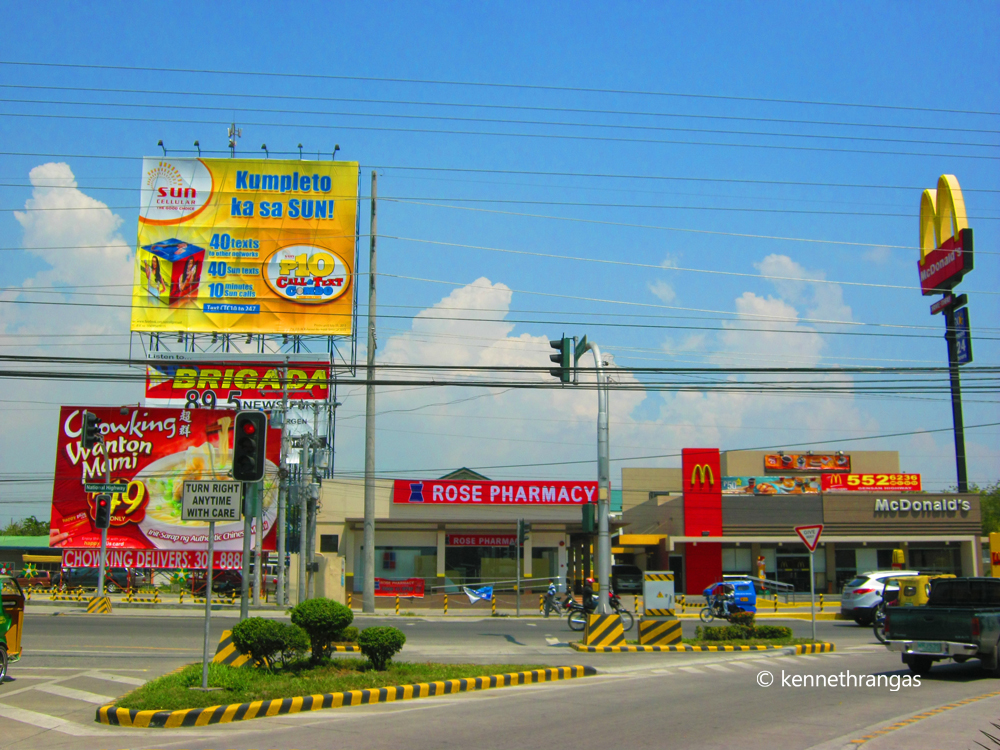
National Highway corner Santiago Boulevard

A year after the Philippines regained full sovereignty from the United States on July 4, 1946, the Municipality of Buayan became a 4th class regular municipality by virtue of the Executive Order Number 82, dated August 18, 1947, by President Manuel Roxas, absorbing the Municipality of Makar and the Municipal District of Glan, whose low income bracket at the time disqualified it for the honour. Dadiangas was the seat of government for the Municipality of Buayan electing Irineo Santiago as its first municipal mayor in a local election that was held on November 11, 1947. Mayor Santiago was formally inducted on January 1, 1948.

Six years later, in June 1954, the Municipality of Buayan was renamed General Santos as a tribute to the leading pioneer via Act No. 1107 authored by Congressman Luminog Mangelen of Cotabato Province.

From 1963 to 1967, the municipality's economy experienced a boom under Mayor Lucio A. Velayo, as several large agri-based and multinational firms such as Dole Philippines, General Milling Corporation and UDAGRI expanded into the area. Although it was then qualified to become a fourth class city from being a municipality, the residents rejected a move by Congressman Salipada Pendatun to convert the Municipality of Buayan into a city and to rename it "Rajah Buayan".

On July 8, 1968, the Municipality of General Santos was converted into a city upon the approval of Republic Act No. 5412, authored by Congressman James Chiongbian. By this time, General Santos City had already established itself as a major economic and educational hub in the region. Three of the oldest educational institutions in the city — Notre Dame of Dadiangas University (1948), Ramon Magsaysay Memorial Colleges (1957), and Mindanao State University–General Santos City (1961) — were established prior to the city's official founding. It was inaugurated on September 5 of that year, with Antonio C. Acharon became the new city's first mayor. On September 5, 1988, a decade after its inauguration as a chartered city, GenSan was declared a highly urbanized city of South Cotabato.

Even after becoming a highly urbanized city independent from South Cotabato in 1988, General Santos remained part of the province's congressional representation. The city only gained a separate representative with the passage of Republic Act No. 11243 on March 11, 2019, which segregated General Santos from the first congressional district of South Cotabato to be its 3rd congressional district. On September 15, 2021, House Bill No. 10021 authored by Representative Ferdinand Hernandez, that officially mandates General Santos as a lone district, separate from South Cotabato was passed on third and final reading.

In April 2001, Mayor Adelbert W. Antonino, an ally of deposed president Joseph Estrada, coordinated with various mayors and governors to bring their respective constituents to Epifanio delos Santos Avenue in Metro Manila to protest the arrest of Estrada.

On June 8, 2026, a M_{w} 7.8 earthquake struck off the southern coast of Mindanao, resulting fatalities and a state-of-emergency in General Santos.

== Geography ==
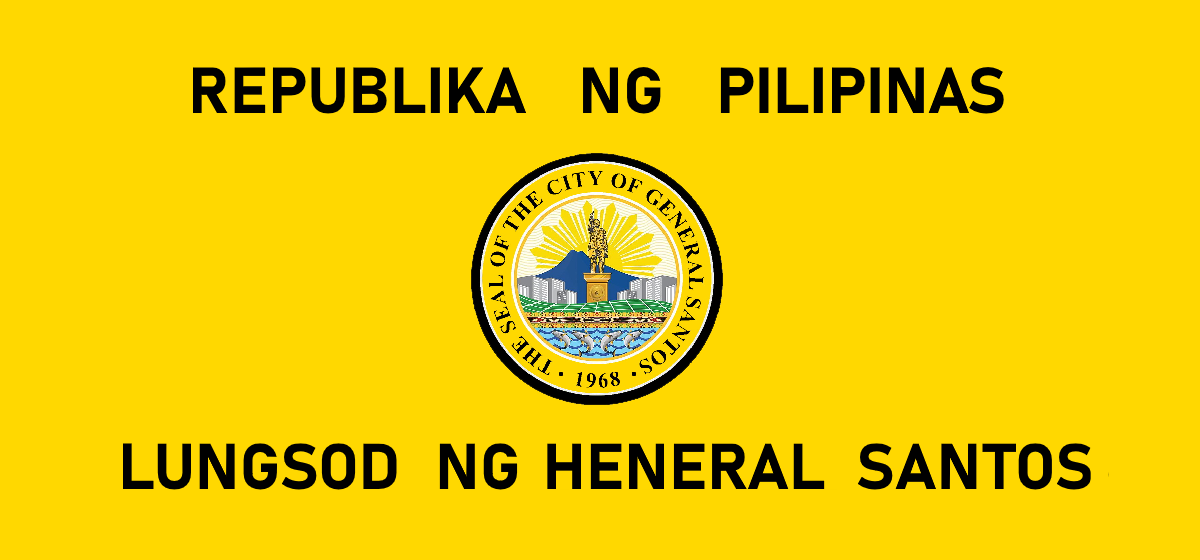
Former flag of General Santos (2019–2022)

General Santos lies in the southernmost part of the Philippines. The city is 1,050 kilometres (650 mi) southeast of Manila, 480 kilometres (300 mi) southeast of Cebu, and 120 kilometres (75 mi) southwest of Davao.

The city is bounded by municipalities of Sarangani Province, namely Alabel in the east, and Maasim in the south. General Santos is likewise bounded by the South Cotabato municipality of Polomolok and Sarangani Province municipality of Malungon in the north, and the municipality of T'boli in the west.

General Santos occupies the whole of South Cotabato's coastline.

=== Climate ===
Climate data for General Santos (1991–2020, extremes 1949–2020)
Month	Jan	Feb	Mar	Apr	May	Jun	Jul	Aug	Sep	Oct	Nov	Dec	Year
Record high °C (°F)	37.5 (99.5)	38.0 (100.4)	38.9 (102.0)	39.0 (102.2)	39.4 (102.9)	38.5 (101.3)	37.0 (98.6)	37.0 (98.6)	36.5 (97.7)	37.0 (98.6)	37.0 (98.6)	37.5 (99.5)	39.0 (102.2)
Mean daily maximum °C (°F)	32.3 (90.1)	32.9 (91.2)	34.0 (93.2)	34.3 (93.7)	33.5 (92.3)	32.2 (90.0)	31.7 (89.1)	31.7 (89.1)	32.2 (90.0)	32.6 (90.7)	32.8 (91.0)	32.6 (90.7)	32.7 (90.9)
Daily mean °C (°F)	27.5 (81.5)	27.9 (82.2)	28.5 (83.3)	28.9 (84.0)	28.5 (83.3)	27.7 (81.9)	27.2 (81.0)	27.3 (81.1)	27.5 (81.5)	27.7 (81.9)	27.9 (82.2)	27.8 (82.0)	27.9 (82.2)
Mean daily minimum °C (°F)	22.6 (72.7)	22.8 (73.0)	23.0 (73.4)	23.5 (74.3)	23.6 (74.5)	23.1 (73.6)	22.8 (73.0)	22.8 (73.0)	22.8 (73.0)	22.8 (73.0)	23.0 (73.4)	23.0 (73.4)	23.0 (73.4)
Record low °C (°F)	17.1 (62.8)	17.2 (63.0)	16.9 (62.4)	18.3 (64.9)	18.7 (65.7)	17.9 (64.2)	17.2 (63.0)	17.5 (63.5)	18.0 (64.4)	18.2 (64.8)	18.3 (64.9)	18.0 (64.4)	16.9 (62.4)
Average rainfall mm (inches)	96.9 (3.81)	53.0 (2.09)	55.3 (2.18)	54.1 (2.13)	72.2 (2.84)	101.9 (4.01)	98.1 (3.86)	91.3 (3.59)	83.3 (3.28)	99.6 (3.92)	77.5 (3.05)	74.9 (2.95)	958.1 (37.72)
Average rainy days (≥ 0.1 mm)	9	7	6	6	8	12	11	11	10	10	8	8	106
Average relative humidity (%)	79	76	75	75	78	82	83	82	81	81	80	79	79
Source: PAGASA

General Santos has a tropical wet and dry climate (Köppen climate classification). With an average annual rainfall of less than 1,000 millimetres (39 in), it is one of the driest places in the Philippines.

=== Barangays ===
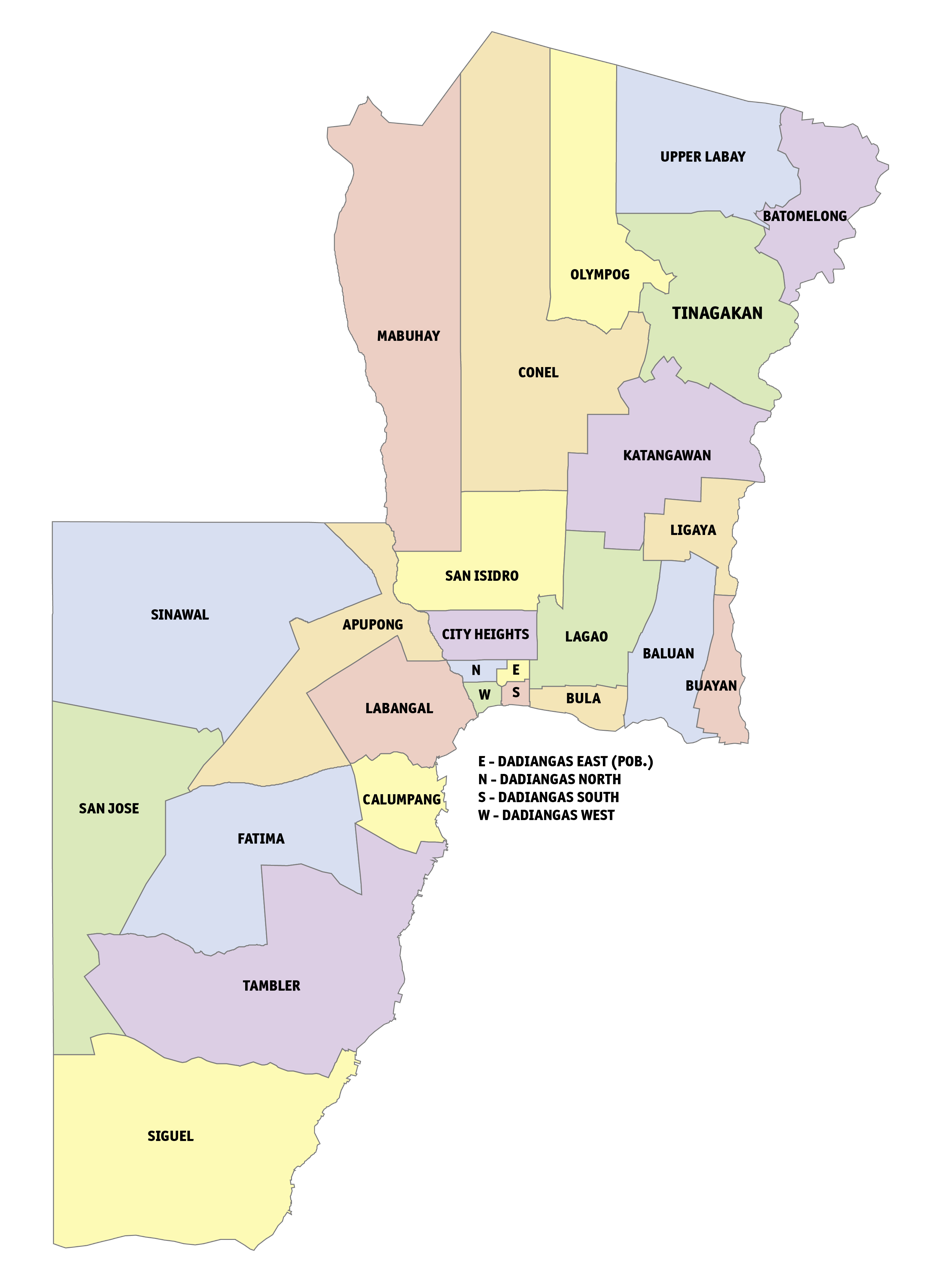
Political map of General Santos

General Santos is politically subdivided into 26 barangays, which are further subdivided into puroks and sitios.

- Apopong (Note: Cebuano: /ʔaˈpo.poŋ/)
- Baluan (Note: Cebuano: /ba.luˈʔan/)
- Batomelong (Note: Cebuano: /ba.toˈmɛ.loŋ/)
- Buayan (Note: Cebuano: /bu.ʔaˈjan/)
- Bula (Note: Cebuano: /buˈlaʔ/)
- Calumpang (Note: Cebuano: /kaˈlum.paŋ/)
- City Heights (Note: Cebuano: /ˌsi.ti ˈhajts/)
- Conel (Note: Cebuano: /ˈko.nɛl/)
- Dadiangas East (Note: Cebuano: /daˌdʒaŋ.gas ˈist/)
- Dadiangas North (Note: Cebuano: /daˌdʒaŋ.gas ˈnoɹt/)
- Dadiangas South (Note: Cebuano: /daˌdʒaŋ.gas ˈsawt/)
- Dadiangas West (Note: Cebuano: /daˌdʒaŋ.gas ˈwɛst/)
- Fatima (Note: Cebuano: /ˈfa.tiˌma/)
- Katangawan (Note: Cebuano: /ka.taŋˈga.wan/)
- Labangal (Note: Cebuano: /la.baˈŋal/)
- Lagao (Note: Cebuano: /laˈgaw/) (Note: The settlement district of Lagao originally comprised three barrios: 1st, 2nd, and 3rd. The 1st and 3rd barrios were later merged to form the present-day Lagao, while the 2nd barrio became the present-day San Isidro.)
- Ligaya (Note: Cebuano: /liˈga.ja/)
- Mabuhay (Note: Cebuano: /maˈbu.haj/)
- Olympog (Note: Cebuano: /ʔoˈlim.pog/)
- San Isidro (Note: Cebuano: /ˌsan iˈsid.ro/)
- San Jose (Note: Cebuano: /ˌsan hoˈsɛ/)
- Siguel (Note: Cebuano: /ˈsi.gɛl/) (Bawing (Note: Cebuano: /ˈba.wiŋ/))
- Sinawal (Note: Cebuano: /siˈna.wal/)
- Tambler (Note: Cebuano: /ˈtam.blɛɾ/)
- Tinagacan (Note: Cebuano: /ti.naˈga.kan/)
- Upper Labay (Note: Cebuano: /ˌʔa.pɛɹ ˈla.baj/)

== Demographics ==
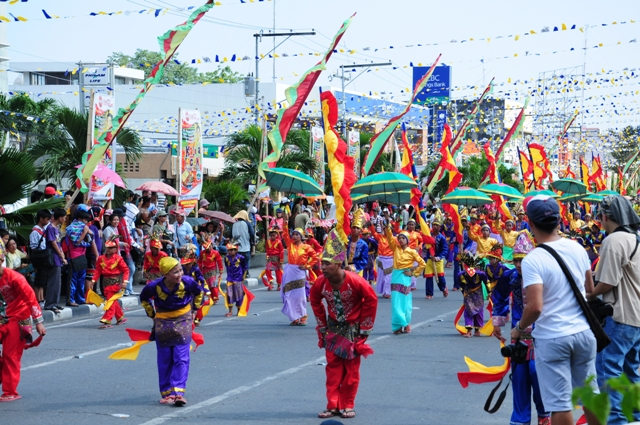
Kadsagayan parade during Kalilangan Festival

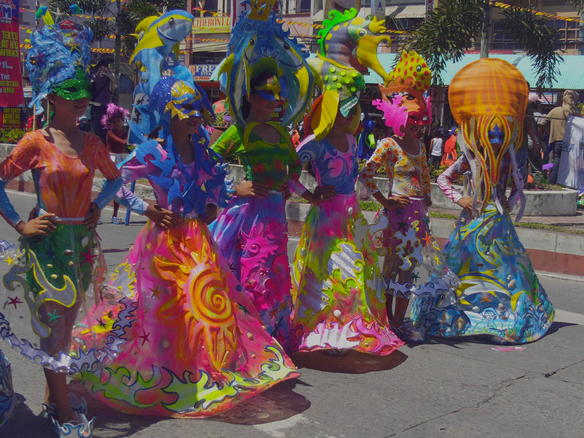
Tuna Festival contingent

Population census of General Santos

Year	Pop.	±% p.a.
1903	33	—
1918	9,787	+46.15%
1939	14,115	+1.76%
1948	32,019	+9.53%
1960	84,988	+8.47%
1970	85,861	+0.10%

Year	Pop.	±% p.a.
1975	91,154	+1.21%
1980	149,396	+10.38%
1990	250,389	+5.30%
1995	327,173	+5.14%
2000	411,822	+5.06%
2007	529,542	+3.53%

Year	Pop.	±% p.a.
2010	538,086	+0.58%
2015	594,446	+1.92%
2020	697,315	+3.42%
2024	722,059	+0.84%

Source: Philippine Statistics Authority

There are two major languages spoken in the city, with Cebuano being widely spoken and being used by the local media outlets in the city (television, radio, and newspapers), followed by Hiligaynon, which is used mainly by settlers who came from the provinces of South Cotabato, Sultan Kudarat, Cotabato, Maguindanao del Norte, and Maguindanao del Sur, as well as immigrants from the provinces of Negros Occidental, Iloilo and Guimaras. Other languages spoken within the city include Blaan, T'boli, Maguindanaon, Ilocano, and Kapampangan.

=== Religion ===
Religion in General Santos (2020)
Religion	percentage
Roman Catholic	65%
Other Christian, including Protestants	20.5%
Islam	9.8%
Iglesia ni Cristo	3.3%
Others	1.4%

The predominant religion in the city is Christianity, with the largest denomination being the Catholic Church, comprising almost 90% of the population. About 9% of the population belongs to Islam, mostly Sunnites.

== Economy ==
Poverty incidence of General Santos (%)

Source: Philippine Statistics Authority

The city's major economic activity is primarily anchored in two sectors namely the agro-industry and fishing industry.

- Agro-industry: Endowed with rich volcanic soil, ample and well distributed rainfall all throughout the year and a typhoon-free climate, General Santos produces export quality high valued crops such as corn, coconut, pineapple, asparagus, banana and rice. It also yields quality exotic fruits, vegetables and cut flowers. The city is also a top producer and exporter of quality livestock such as poultry, hogs, and cattle. But with the continuing growth in population and economy in the passing of time, a number of the city's agricultural lands have gradually been converted into built up areas in order to address the relatively growing need for dwellings and viable spaces.

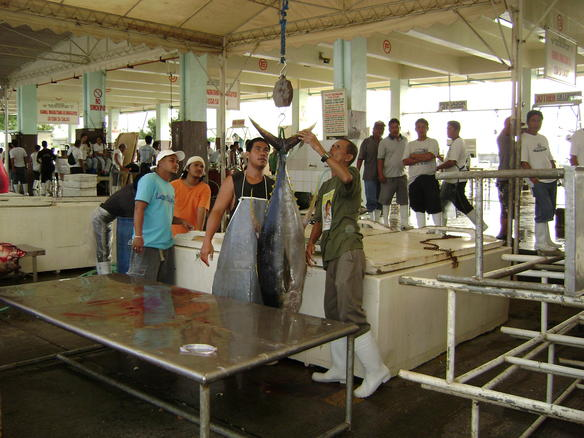
Fishport Complex in Barangay Tambler

- Fishing industry: General Santos is the largest producer of sashimi-grade tuna in the Philippines. Thus, as early as 1970, it was nicknamed "Tuna Capital of the Philippines". The city also accounts for the second-largest daily total catch of fish in the country after Navotas in the National Capital Region. The fishing industry in yields a total daily capacity of 750 metric tons of fish catch, and employs about 7,800 workers. General Santos is home to seven tuna processing plants. The Fishport Complex in Barangay Tambler has a 750 metres (2,460 ft) quay and a 300 metres (980 ft) wharf for 2,000 GT reefer carriers. The fish port is equipped with modern facilities that comply with international standards on fish catch handling. Locals in the city boast that fish and seafood do not come fresher than what is found in their locality.

General Santos registered 1,365 new medium to large enterprises in 2011. An aggregate investment involved is estimated at PHP 1.202 billion. Top industries for new investment in 2011 were as follows: hotel and restaurant - 31%; wholesale & retail trade - 20%; repair of motor vehicles, motorcycles and personal & household goods, real estate & renting business activities - 17%; other community, social & personal services - 8%; financial intermediation - 5%; manufacturing - 5%; fishing - 3 %; and ICT - 3%.

As of 2000, there are 59 banks serving the city. This includes 46 commercial banks, five savings banks, seven rural banks and 1 cooperative bank. Aside from this, there are 48 lending institutions as well as 49 pawnshops providing emergency loan assistance.

=== Shopping ===
SM City General Santos

General Santos is the shopping capital of the Soccksargen region. Residents from nearby towns and provinces visit the city to do shopping and enjoy life and leisure activities. There are several huge shopping malls in the city, notable ones are KCC Mall of Gensan, SM City General Santos, Robinsons Place GenSan, Gaisano Mall of GenSan, RD Plaza (Fitmart), Veranza Mall, and the newest addition to the city which is RD City Mall located at Barangay Mabuhay, Unitop Shopping Mall in Barangay Dadiangas West and AllHome (soon in Barangay Katangawan, Circumferential Road). SM Savemore has two branches in the city and another branch will be built within the downtown area. There are also news about building an Ayala Mall and Puregold. These malls are home to both national and international brands of retail merchandise as well as restaurants and cafes. There are many merchandise and large groceries owned by local and foreign Chinese, Taiwanese and Korean businessmen in the city.

== Infrastructure ==
Communication

Modern and state-of-the-art communication facilities at par with global standards are readily available and are provided in General Santos by major telecommunication companies in the country. These include voice, data, internet and network solutions, among others, in both wired and mobile forms.

=== Transportation ===
GenSan and the whole of Soccsksargen can be reached by air, land, or sea.

Air transportation

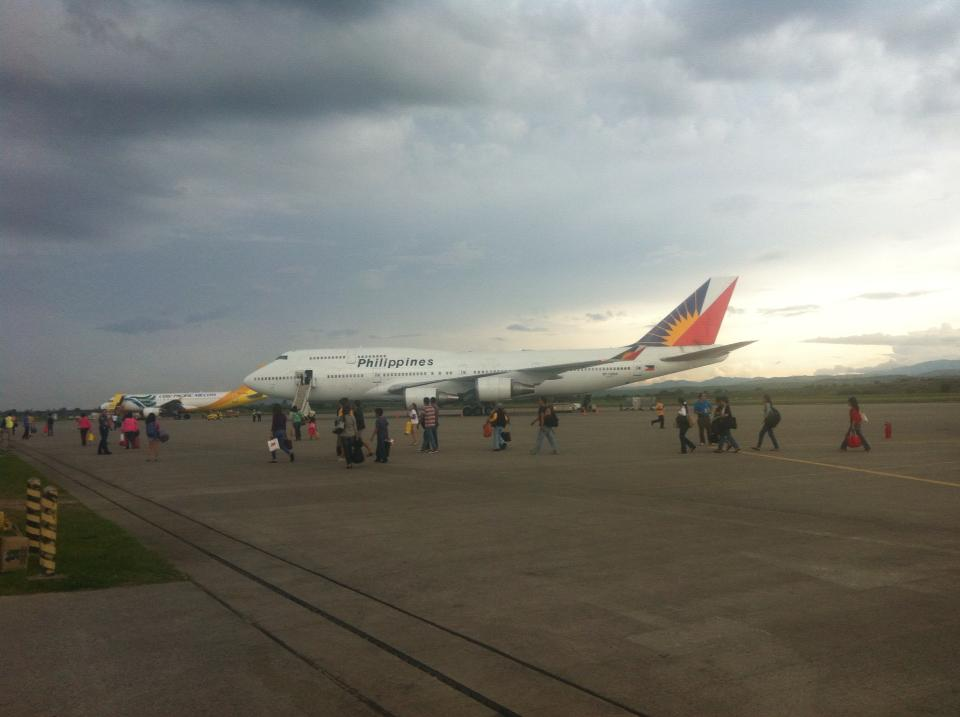
Airliners disembarking at General Santos International Airport

The General Santos International Airport is the largest airport in Mindanao. It has a 3,227-metre concrete runway capable of handling wide-bodied jets like Airbus A340 and Boeing 747. It was also called Rajah Buayan Airport in the 1990s, and Tambler Airport in 2008, before being renamed to its current name. Flights to and from Manila, Iloilo, and Cebu are currently being operated in the airport by Philippine Airlines and Cebu Pacific. General Santos International Airport is the second busiest airport in Mindanao and the 9th busiest airport in the Philippines.

Sea transportation

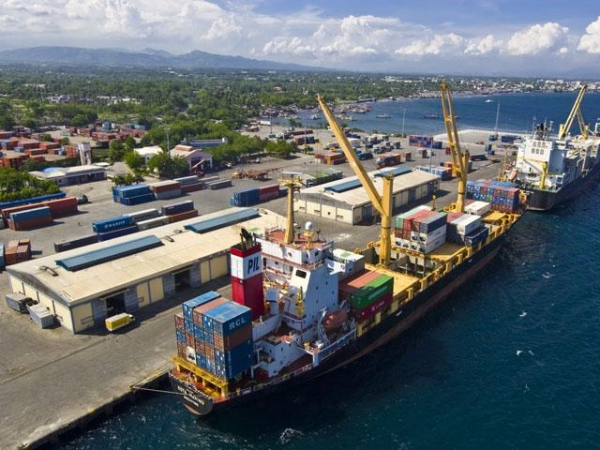
Aerial view of Makar Wharf, the main international sea port of General Santos

The Makar Wharf is the main international sea port of the city and is one of the finest sea ports in the country. It is located in Barangay Labangal, away from the central business district. With a 740 metres (2,430 ft) docking length and a 19 metres (62 ft) width, the wharf can accommodate up to nine ship berthing positions all at the same time. The port is replete with modern facilities such as container yards, storage and weighing bridges. 2GO Travel operates regular inter-island ferry services to and from other major ports in Luzon, Visayas and Mindanao while numerous Indonesian shipping lines operate international ferry service between General Santos and neighboring ports in Indonesia carrying both passenger and cargo loads.

Land transportation

Commuting in and around General Santos is a fast and convenient ride. More than 400 passenger buses, public utility vans and jeepneys wield routes within the city and neighboring provinces like in Koronadal, Cotabato, Davao, Tacurong, Pagadian, Cagayan de Oro and others. Three-wheeled motorized cabs known as tricycles are the city's main mode of public transport and have been on the road since pioneering times. Air-conditioned taxis also ply the city's streets offering commuters a choice of a more comfortable mode of transportation.

Maintained by the City Engineers' Office, the city's major road networks are paved and endowed with safety road marks, signs and signals to ensure a secure and efficient traffic flow within the city. The Pan-Philippine Highway links the city by land to other major cities in Mindanao and to the rest of the country.

The General Santos Terminal, popularly known as Bulaong Terminal, located in Barangay Dadiangas North, is the city's main integrated land transport terminal. The terminal serves as the city's gateway for land travelers. Buses and other forms of public mass transportation go to and from various parts of Mindanao such as Koronadal, Tacurong, Cotabato, Davao, Kidapawan, Digos, Pagadian, and Cagayan de Oro.

=== Utilities ===
Power
The majority of the city's power supply is being serviced by the second district of South Cotabato Electric Cooperative (SOCOTECO-II). The said power distributor acquires the majority of its power needs for the city's consumption from the National Transmission Corporation (TransCo) while other sources are drawn from various Independent Power Producers (IPP) from nearby power plants and barges.

Water
The majority of the households and other entities in the city are provided and serviced with clean, safe and potable water supply from deep well sources by General Santos City Water District (GSCWD). Potable water sources in other far flung and remote parts of the city where cannot be reached by the local water utility service are being served by their individual Barangay Water And Sanitation systems.

Waste management
In a bid to achieve an efficient and sustainable management of non-hazardous waste the city produces every single day, the finalization and construction of the city's waste water treatment facility is currently underway at the corner of P. Acharon and I. Santiago Boulevards. The said location is adjacent to the city public market and is the former site of the city's Fish Landing. The facility will include settling ponds and anaerobic reactors, among others.

Likewise is the finalization stage for the construction of a multi-million peso solid waste management and disposal system in Barangay Sinawal. The new and modern solid waste management facility will replace the existing city dumpsite in Barangay Siguel.

=== Security and civil defense ===
The Philippine National Police, a military task force, has been formed to protect the city from terrorist attacks and other crime. Task Force GenSan is affiliated with the Philippine Army and is headed by an army colonel. Eight police stations are built on each barangay to keep the safety and a peaceful order in the city.

=== Health services ===
The average life expectancy of Gensanon is 70 for females and 65 for males. There are 19 hospitals, with more than 2,200 beds in the city including General Santos Doctors Hospital, St. Elizabeth Hospital, SOCSARGEN County Hospital, Mindanao Medical Center, R.O Diagan Cooperative Hospital, GenSan Medical Center, Sarangani Bay Specialists Medical Center, General Santos City District Hospital and the newly inaugurated Dadiangas Medical Center servicing a care for the people. In addition, there is an ongoing construction of ACE Medical Center to add more hospital bed capacity and medical services in the city.

== Education ==
Notre Dame of Dadiangas University, a Catholic institution run by the Marist Brothers or FMS (Fratres Maristae a Scholis)

General Santos City has more than 100 public schools and a state-owned university, Mindanao State University–General Santos. The city also hosts three private sectarian universities: Notre Dame of Dadiangas University, New Era University–General Santos, and the University of Santo Tomas–General Santos.

=== Ramon Magsaysay Memorial Colleges ===
Ramon Magsaysay Memorial Colleges (RMMC), formerly known as Magsaysay Memorial Colleges (MMC), is a pioneering, privately owned, non-sectarian institution that traces its origins to the establishment of the Mindanao Vocational School (MVS) in 1957 by Atty. Eugenio Millado and his wife, Doña Aurora Garcia-Millado. The college later acquired Southern Island Colleges (SIC), which contributed to the expansion of its academic programs and institutional capacity.

Over the decades, RMMC has played a significant role in the local education sector. In recent years, the institution has emphasized academic development, cultural development, sports development, community engagement, and initiatives toward globalization as part of its holistic educational approach. In 2025, RMMC gained international recognition by ranking 234th among the World's Top 400 Most Innovative Universities in the World University Rankings for Innovation (WURI).

== Media ==
Notable media publications in the city are the SunStar General Santos, Periodiko Banat, Sapol, and other local newspapers. Brigada Newspaper General Santos is the most popular newspaper company in the city.

Several television stations in the city are owned and operated by broadcasting networks—ABS-CBN 3 Soccsksargen (now defunct), GMA 8 Soccsksargen, TV5 Channel 12 Gensan, GMA News TV 26, ABS-CBN Sports+Action Channel 36 (now defunct), Brigada News TV 39. Most of these television networks reach as far as Davao Region and Northern Mindanao, and cater to the whole Soccsksargen Region. Major and minor cable and satellite television companies also operate in the city. Most of the FM and AM radio stations are operating in the city 24 hours a day, such as MOR 92.7 General Santos (now defunct), 89.5 Brigada News FM, iFM 91.9, 94.3 Yes! FM General Santos, Radyo5 97.5 News FM, K101.5 Love Radio GenSan, and Barangay 102.3 GenSan.

There are four local newscast programs in General Santos: TV Patrol Socsksargen (ABS-CBN 3 Soccsksargen) (now defunct), GMA Soccsksargen Flash Bulletin (GMA 8 Soccsksargen, now part of One Mindanao Flagship Newscast), Balita38 (EGTV Channel 46), and Ronda Brigada (Brigada News TV channel 39).

== Notable personalities ==
- Gerald Anderson, actor
- Shirlyn L. Bañas-Nograles, politician
- Sebastian Benedict (Baeby Baste) of Eat Bulaga!, child actor
- Ethel Booba, TV personality
- Melai Cantiveros-Francisco, actress, host, big winner of Pinoy Big Brother: Double Up
- Nonito Donaire, professional boxer
- Racso Jugarap, international artist
- Ali Macalintal, human rights activist
- Rolando Navarrete, professional boxer
- Jinkee Pacquiao, politician
- Manny Pacquiao, professional boxer
- Bo Perasol, head coach UAAP basketball of Ateneo de Manila University Blue Eagles
- Shamcey Supsup, Miss Universe 2011 3rd runner-up and national director of Miss Universe Philippines
- Zendee Rose Tenerefe, singer, YouTube personality
- XB Gensan, dance group, Grand Champion, Showtime Season 1

== Sister cities ==
=== Local ===
- Naga, Camarines Sur
- Quezon City, since October 12, 1994
- Iloilo City, since 1980
- Cotabato City

=== International ===
- Canberra, Australia
- (United States) Jersey City, USA
- Monterrey, Mexico
- Hadano, Kanagawa, Japan

== Gallery ==
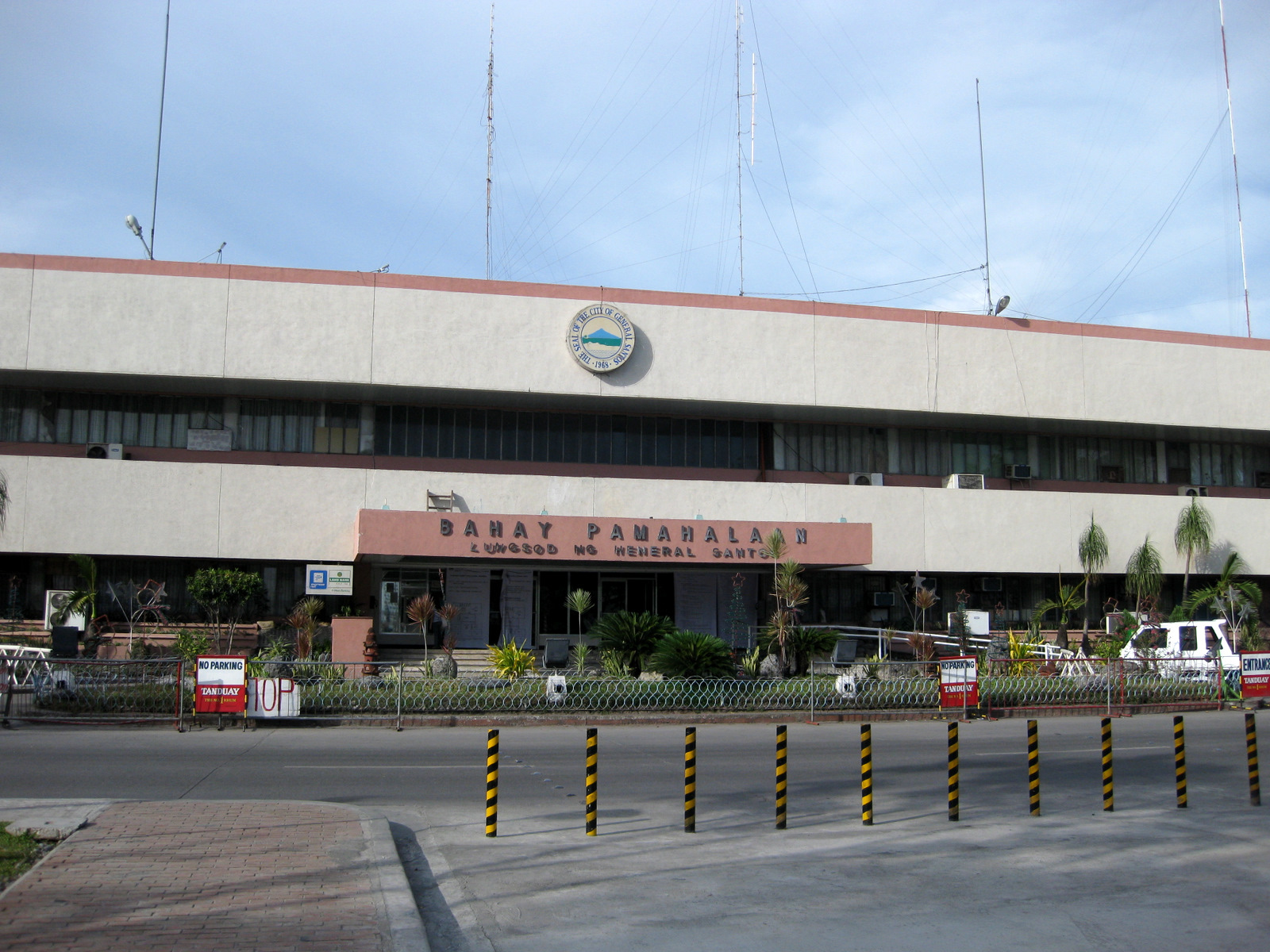
General Santos City Hall

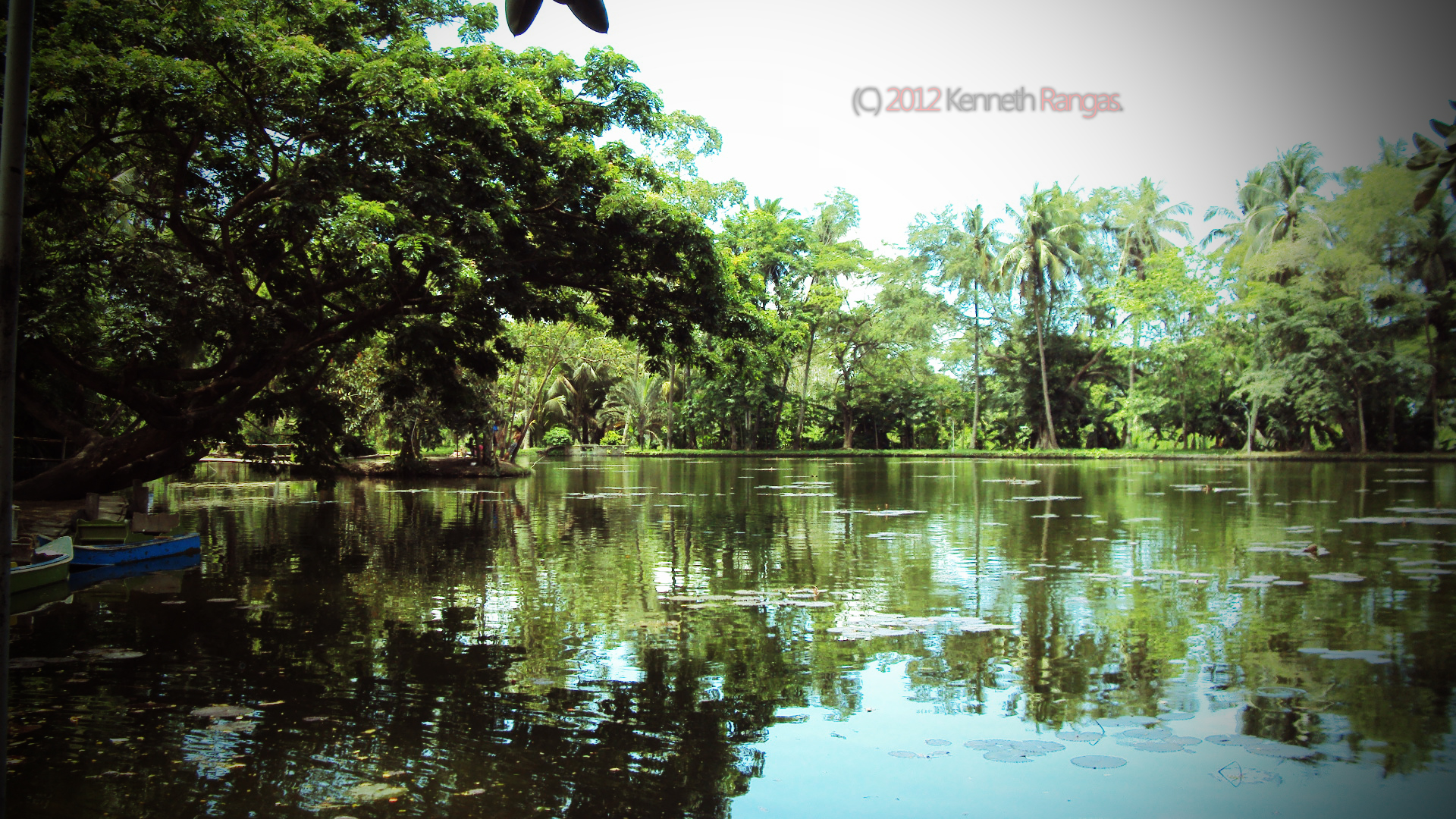
Amarandi Cove Lake

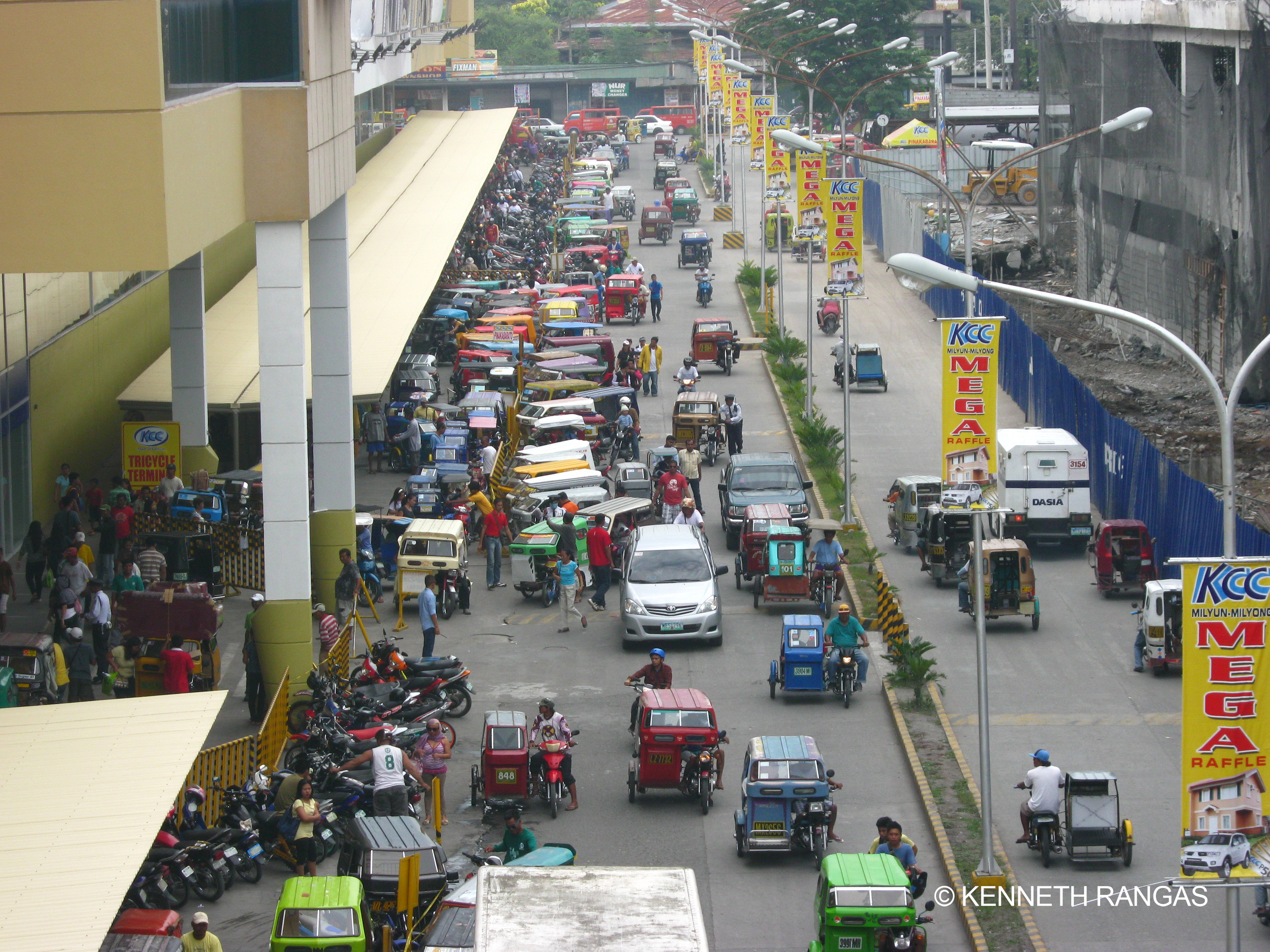
KCC Mall General Santos

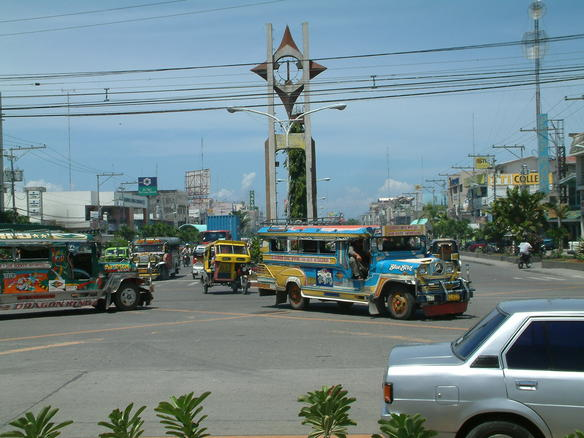
Pioneer Avenue

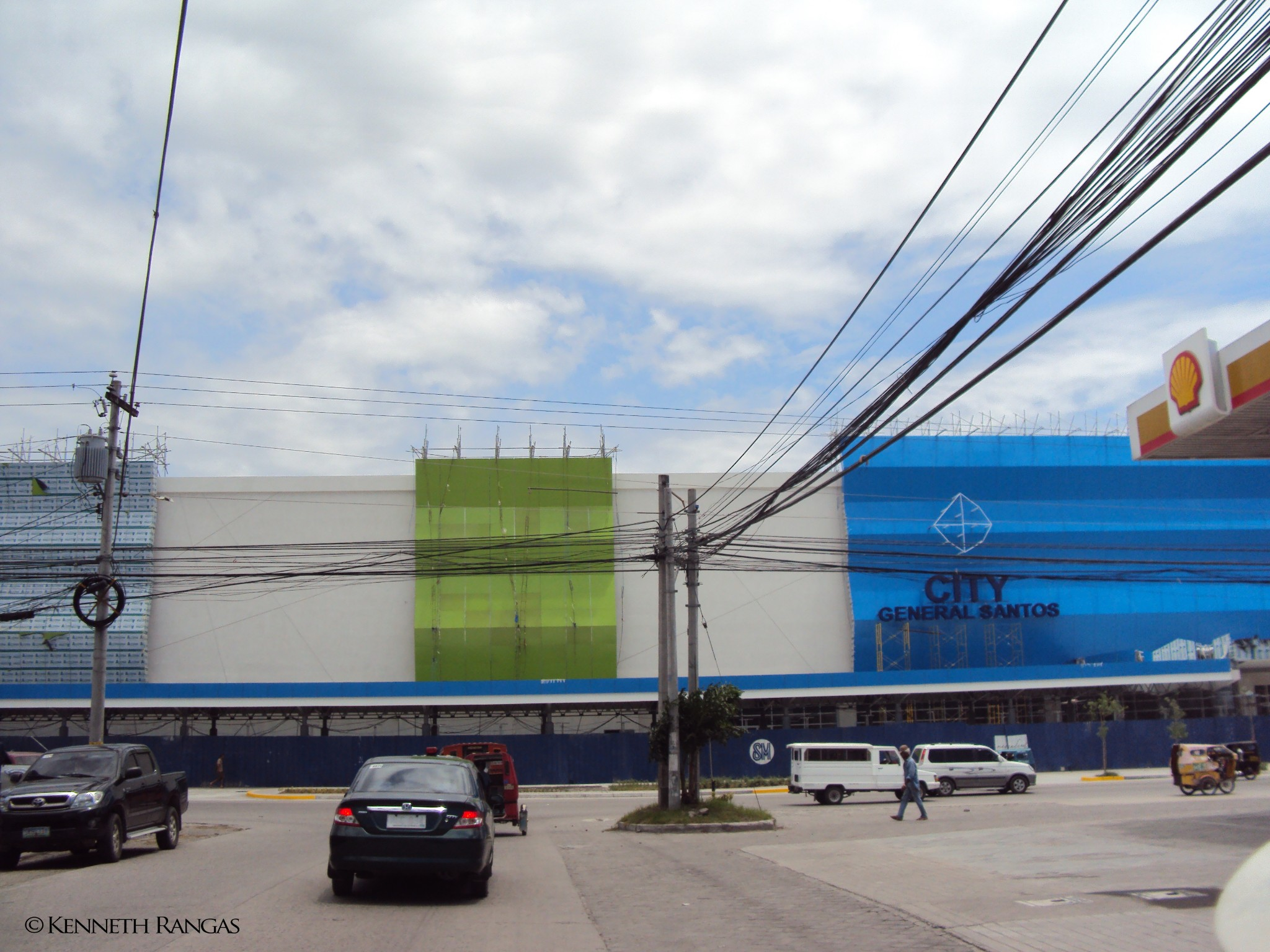
SM City General Santos

== See also ==
- List of renamed cities and municipalities of the Philippines
