= Bahaghari Philippines =

Philippine LGBTQIA+ rights organization

Bahaghari
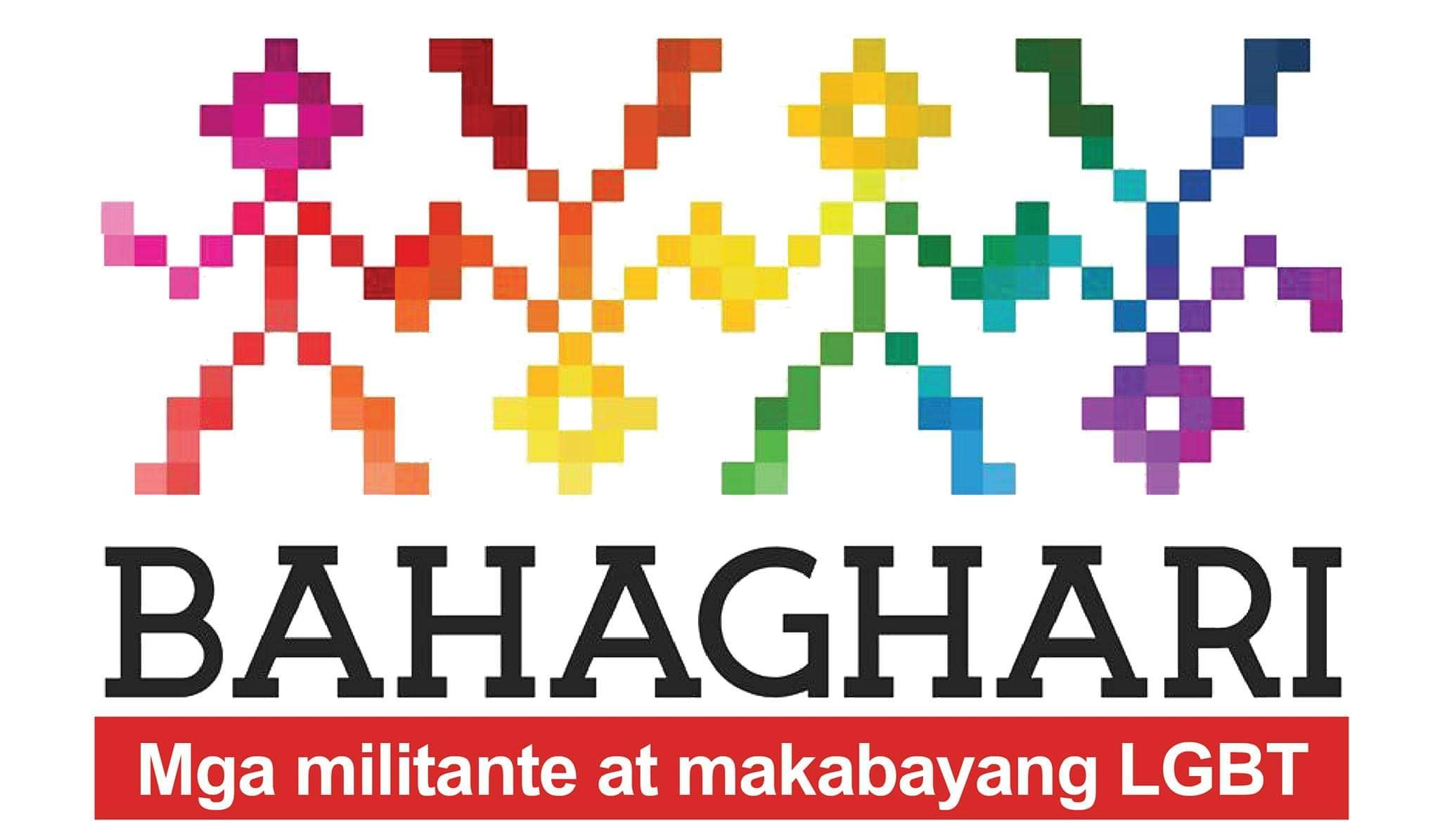
- Chairperson: Rey Valmores-Salinas
- Secretary-General: Arriane Samsico
- Founded: 2013, 2015 (as national democratic organization)
- Headquarters: Quezon City
- Ideology: National democracy LGBT rights Marxism; Anti-imperialism
- Political position: Left-wing
- Colors: Rainbow
- Slogan: Makibeki, 'wag mashokot! [In gay lingo] (Dare to struggle, have no fear!)

Website
- www.facebook.com/BahaghariLGBT

Bahaghari (literally, "Rainbow") is the anti-imperialist national democratic organization of LGBT+ Filipinos advocating for LGBT+ rights in the country.

Bahaghari is a nationwide coalition of various LGBT+ affiliates, member organizations, and advocates that take a stand on issues such as discrimination, homophobia, transphobia, misogyny, violence, militarization, imperialism, poverty, homelessness, neoliberalism, labor contractualization, and various other issues that affect LGBT+ Filipinos.

== History ==
Bahaghari was founded in Quezon Province on June 26, 2013—exactly nine years since the first Pride March in Asia and the Pacific led by ProGay Philippines and the Metropolitan Community Church Philippines (MCCP) on June 26, 1994. On October 11, 2015, one year after the killing of Filipina Jennifer Laude, a transgender Filipina woman, by US Lance Corporal Joseph Scott Pemberton, Bahaghari mounted a protest comprising LGBT+ youth, students, and workers against US imperialism. This formally established Bahaghari as a national democratic organization. As Pemberton was known to be one among hundreds of US soldiers stationed in the Philippines for the Balikatan Exercise as stipulated in the Visiting Forces Agreement, Bahaghari protested the skewed military agreements between the US and the Philippines which precipitated in Jennifer Laude's death and the abuses against several other Filipino women in the hands of US soldiers, such as the Enhanced Defence Cooperation Agreement and the Mutual Defense Treaty. Bahaghari led the September mobilizations decrying the absolute pardon granted by President Rodrigo Duterte for Pemberton on September 7, 2020.

Through the years, Bahaghari has led numerous campaigns for LGBT rights, and has notably led or co-organized various Pride Marches in the country, such as the Metro Manila Pride, Metro Baguio Pride, Central Luzon Pride, and Southern Tagalog Pride. Bahaghari has persistently called for the passage of national anti-discrimination legislation and marriage equality, among others.

== Campaigns and advocacies ==
=== #AchibDisBill ===
AchibDisbill—a play on "ADB" or Anti-Discrimination Bill—is a national campaign spearheaded by Bahaghari for the passage of the Anti-Discrimination Bill, otherwise known as the SOGIE (Sexual Orientation, Gender Identity, and Expression) Equality Bill. The bill, if pushed into law, would provide legal remedies for Filipinos who experience discrimination in the workplace, education, religion, healthcare, and other spaces on the basis of their sexual orientation, gender identity, and gender expression. AchibDisBill's strategies include seminars, gender sensitivity trainings, workshops, and educational discussions for various communities in the Philippines including schools, universities, workplaces, urban poor communities, NGOs, government offices, and more, alongside cultural events such as drag shows and poetry nights.

In terms of direct lobbying and legislative initiatives, Bahaghari has worked alongside Gabriela Women's Party, a principal author of the bill, in developing revisions for the SOGIE Equality Bill for the 18th Congress. Bahaghari has spoken in support of the Anti-Discrimination Bill in various Congressional hearings in the Committee on Women and Gender Equality.

=== Pride marches and community initiatives ===
Since 2018, Bahaghari organized the annual Metro Baguio Pride as part of the Amianan Pride Council. In 2021, the very first regional-wide Central Luzon Pride was launched, led and organized by Bahaghari in Pampanga, Philippines. In the same year, Bahaghari co-organized the 2021 Metro Manila Pride with the eponymous organization. At present, Bahaghari is part of the secretariat of Southern Tagalog Pride.

In 2020, Bahaghari drew national and international attention after organizing the Mendiola Pride March in Manila, Philippines. The peaceful Pride parade, which brought together advocates seeking the immediate passage of the SOGIE Equality Bill as well as the junking of the controversial Anti-Terrorism Bill, was violently interrupted by police forces who arrested 20 march attendees—henceforth named Pride 20. During their 5-day detention, members of Pride 20 reported instances of transphobia, psychological torture, sexual harassment, and acts of lasciviousness committed by the police. This sparked national conversation on the plight of the LGBT+ community, as well as the implications of the Anti-Terrorism Act which various human rights organizations condemned as a watershed for greater rights violations by men in uniform. Bahaghari has since become the tenth Supreme Court petitioner against the Anti-Terrorism Act through their former Spokesperson and now Chairwoman Rey Valmores-Salinas.

In 2021, during the series of heavy lockdowns as a result of COVID-19, Bahaghari organized a "Rainbow Pantry" which provided free food and basic items for the urban poor community of Tatalon, Quezon City.

=== Hands Off Queer Activists ===
In response to the growing number of LGBT human rights defenders facing trumped-up charges, illegal arrests, killings, and various other forms of attacks in the Philippines, Bahaghari launched Hands Off Queer Activists, a campaign for the protection of LGBT rights advocates and the immediate release of all political prisoners, most especially queer political prisoners.

== See also ==
- LGBT rights in the Philippines
- Socialism and LGBT rights
