= List of shipwrecks in 1987 =

The list of shipwrecks in 1987 includes ships sunk, foundered, grounded, or otherwise lost during 1987.

table of contents
1987
Jan	Feb	Mar	Apr
May	Jun	Jul	Aug
Sep	Oct	Nov	Dec
Unknown date

== January ==
=== 4 January ===
List of shipwrecks: 4 January 1987
Ship	State	Description
Lady Blue	United States	The 90-foot (27.4 m) fishing vessel sank in Unimak Pass in the Aleutian Islands.

=== 14 January ===
List of shipwrecks: 14 January 1987
Ship	State	Description
Testa Rosa	Philippines	The cargo ship foundered in the Atlantic Ocean off the coast of Portugal with the loss of all 30 crew. Researchers consider this incident to be one of the 22 supercarrier losses very likely associated with rogue wave encounters between 1968 and 1995.

=== 16 January ===
List of shipwrecks: 16 January 1987
Ship	State	Description
Hetta	United States	The 83-foot (25.3 m) fish tender ran aground and sank off Whale Head Island (55°51′40″N 133°41′00″W) on the west side of Prince of Wales Island in the Alexander Archipelago in Southeast Alaska. Another fishing vessel rescued her crew of three.

=== 28 January ===
List of shipwrecks: 28 January 1987
Ship	State	Description
Laura	United States	The 48-foot (14.6 m) fishing vessel sank in the Shelikof Strait between mainland Alaska and the Kodiak Archipelago.

== February ==
=== 1 February ===
List of shipwrecks: 1 February 1987
Ship	State	Description
Midnatsol Norge	Norway	The hotel ship foundered off Fredrikstad, Norway. The wreck was raised and broken up at Bruges, Belgium, in June 1987.

=== 4 February ===
List of shipwrecks: 4 February 1987
Ship	State	Description
Pacific Star	United States	The 40-foot (12.2 m) fishing vessel sank with the loss of one crew member after a rogue wave struck her in the North Pacific Ocean approximately 60 nautical miles (110 km) south of Agattu in the Near Islands in the western Aleutian Islands. The other five people aboard were rescued.

=== 6 February ===
List of shipwrecks: 6 February 1987
Ship	State	Description
Amatuli	United States	The fishing vessel caught fire and was abandoned in the Bering Sea approximately 45 nautical miles (83 km) east of St. George Island. She was salvaged, repaired, and returned to service.

=== 8 February ===
List of shipwrecks: 8 February 1960
Ship	State	Description
Fukuyoshi Maru No. 85	Japan	The longliner's crew abandoned ship after she suffered a propane explosion in her galley and subsequently was gutted by fire in the Bering Sea 120 nautical miles (220 km) northwest of Dutch Harbor in the Aleutian Islands. One member of her crew died, presumably in the explosion; her other 25 crew members were rescued by the fishing vessel Fukuyoshi Maru No. 8 (Japan). The United States Coast Guard sank her drifting wreck on 14 February.

=== 20 February ===
List of shipwrecks: 20 February 1987
Ship	State	Description
USS Accokeek	United States Navy	The decommissioned auxiliary ocean tug was sunk as an artificial reef in the Gulf of Mexico.

== March ==
=== 2 March ===
List of shipwrecks: 2 March 1987
Ship	State	Description
Grampian Castle	United Kingdom	The 139.1-foot (42.4 m), 398-ton oil rig standby (rescue) vessel, a former trawler, stranded and was lost after running aground at Newborough Beach, Menai Straits, Wales.
Thomas M.	United Kingdom	The 397-ton ship capsized and sank due to cargo shift.

=== 4 March ===
List of shipwrecks: 4 March 1987
Ship	State	Description
HMAS Colac	Royal Australian Navy	The decommissioned tank cleaning vessel, formerly a Bathurst-class corvette, was sunk as a target in the Tasman Sea off the coast of Australia at 34°49′12″S 151°32′00″E by a Mark 48 torpedo fired by the submarine HMAS Ovens (Royal Australian Navy).

=== 6 March ===
List of shipwrecks: 6 March 1987
Ship	State	Description
Herald of Free Enterprise	United Kingdom	The roll-on/roll-off passenger ferry took on water, capsized and sank stern-first with the loss of 193 lives in the North Sea off Zeebrugge, Belgium. Investigators subsequently discovered that her bow doors had been left open.
Northern Challenger	United States	The 80-foot (24.4 m) fishing vessel sank off Ugak Island (57°23′N 152°17′W) in the Kodiak Archipelago. The fishing vessel Saint Janet (United States) rescued her entire crew of four.

=== 8 March ===
List of shipwrecks: 8 March 1987
Ship	State	Description
Birgit N (or Birgit – N)	United States	The 123-foot (37.5 m) crab-fishing vessel was wrecked in Patton Cove (51°20′45″N 178°57′00″W) on the coast of Ulak Island in the Aleutian Islands.

=== 15 March ===
List of shipwrecks: 15 March 1987
Ship	State	Description
Komsomolets Kirgizii	Soviet Union	The cargo ship foundered in the Atlantic Ocean 150 nautical miles (280 km) off New Jersey, United States. All 37 crew were rescued by American helicopters.

=== 16 March ===
List of shipwrecks: 16 March 1987
Ship	State	Description
Lovac	United States	The 32-foot (9.8 m) fishing vessel disappeared after departing Kodiak, Alaska, to fish for sablefish. It is not clear whether one or two people vanished along with the vessel.

=== 20 March ===
List of shipwrecks: 20 March 1987
Ship	State	Description
All Alaskan	United States	The 340-foot (103.6 m) fish processing ship ran aground north of Big Lake (57.2083333°N 170.1666667°W) on the coast of Saint Paul Island in the Bering Sea. All 142 people aboard survived. Her wreck later was demolished and removed.

=== 21 March ===
List of shipwrecks: 21 March 1987
Ship	State	Description
Ocean Clipper	United States	The 90-foot (27.4 m) fishing vessel was driven ashore during a gale and wrecked on the south coast of Saint Paul Island in the Bering Sea during a storm. Her crew of six abandoned ship in a life raft, reached a reef, and then walked to the shore, from which the high endurance cutter USCGC Midgett ( United States Coast Guard) rescued them. Ocean Clipper's wreck was demolished and removed in 2010.

== April ==
=== 4 April ===
List of shipwrecks: 4 April 1987
Ship	State	Description
Katy Too	United States	The 30-foot (9.1 m) fishing vessel was lost when she was intentionally run aground in Icy Strait in the Alexander Archipelago in Southeast Alaska.

=== 8 April ===
List of shipwrecks: 8 April 1987
Ship	State	Description
Naknek	United States	The 81-foot (24.7 m) tender ran aground and sank in Wells Bay (60°53′30″N 147°28′30″W) in Prince William Sound on the south-central coast of Alaska.

=== 16 April ===
List of shipwrecks: 16 April 1987
Ship	State	Description
Musson	Soviet Navy	The Project 1234 (NATO reporting name Nanuchka-class) corvette sank after being hit by a P-15M anti-ship cruise missile during an air defence exercise in the Sea of Japan.

=== 21 April ===
List of shipwrecks: 21 April 1987
Ship	State	Description
Jamie Lynn	United States	Damaged earlier while in the harbor at Saint Paul on Saint Paul Island in the Pribilof Islands, the 93-foot (28.3 m) crab-fishing vessel sank with the loss of three lives in the Bering Sea 90 nautical miles (170 km; 100 mi) north of Dutch Harbor, Alaska, while under tow by the fish processing vessel Long Harbor (United States).

=== 28 April ===
List of shipwrecks: 28 April 1987
Ship	State	Description
Ranger	United States	The 55-foot (16.8 m) longline fishing vessel capsized and sank in Southeast Alaska approximately 30 nautical miles (56 km; 35 mi) northwest of Sitka, Alaska. The United States Coast Guard rescued all three members of her crew from a life raft.

== May ==
=== 1 May ===
List of shipwrecks: 1 May 1987
Ship	State	Description
Saint Eloi	France	Collided with Cambridge Ferry (United Kingdom) off Dover, England. Both ships were damaged.

=== 5 May ===
List of shipwrecks: 5 May 1987
Ship	State	Description
Chabro	United States	The 56-foot (17.1 m) fishing vessel sank in a storm with the loss of one life approximately 80 nautical miles (150 km; 92 mi) southeast of Seward, Alaska. The fishing vessel Kodiak (United States) rescued her four survivors.
Kahiltna II	United States	The 47-foot (14.3 m) halibut-fishing vessel sank in a storm approximately 55 nautical miles (102 km; 63 mi) from Cape Resurrection (59°52′N 149°17′W) on the south-central coast of Alaska. Her crew of five abandoned ship in a life raft and was rescued by the fishing vessel Sea Scape (United States).
Kvingo	United States	The 38-foot (11.6 m) halibut-fishing vessel sank in a storm off the northwest coast of Coronation Island in the Alexandar Archipelago in Southeast Alaska south of Sitka, Alaska. The United States Coast Guard rescued her crew of two.

=== 6 May ===
List of shipwrecks: 6 May 1987
Ship	State	Description
Hotline	United States	The 42-foot (12.8 m) seiner disappeared in a storm with the loss of all four men on board near Nuka Bay (59°19′N 150°33′W) on the east coast of the Kenai Peninsula on the south-central coast of Alaska.

=== 27 May ===
List of shipwrecks: 27 May 1987
Ship	State	Description
Nawal	Saudi Arabia	Sank at moorings, Jeddah.

== June ==
=== 11 June ===
List of shipwrecks: 11 June 1987
Ship	State	Description
Southern Viking	United States	The fish tender sank after striking a rock off Sutwick Island (57°20′N 153°22′W) in the Kodiak Archipelago. Her crew of four abandoned ship wearing survival suits and were rescued by a fish processing vessel.

=== 12 June ===
List of shipwrecks: 12 June 1987
Ship	State	Description
Iron Cumberland	Hong Kong	The ore carrier sank in the Pacific Ocean. All 29 crew were rescued by Act 5 (United Kingdom).

=== 15 June ===
List of shipwrecks: 15 June 1987
Ship	State	Description
ARA Comodoro Py	Argentine Navy	The decommissioned Gearing-class destroyer was sunk as a target by a torpedo fired by the submarine ARA Santa Cruz (Argentine Navy).

=== 16 June ===
List of shipwrecks: 16 June 1987
Ship	State	Description
Miss Universe	United States	The 85-foot (25.9 m) fishing vessel foundered during a voyage from Chignik Lagoon, Alaska, on the coast of the Alaska Peninsula to Alitak Bay (56.8853°N 154.1217°W) on the southern end of Kodiak Island. A United States Coast Guard search discovered her submerged pilothouse in the Semidi Islands. Her entire crew of three – two men and a woman – perished.
HMS Yarmouth	Royal Navy	The decommissioned Rothesay-class frigate was sunk as a target in the North Atlantic Ocean by the destroyer HMS Manchester (Royal Navy).

=== 19 June ===
List of shipwrecks: 19 June 1987
Ship	State	Description
Cape Chacon	United States	The 44-foot (13.4 m) seiner capsized and sank with the loss of one life in the Gulf of Alaska approximately 50 nautical miles (93 km; 58 mi) south of Montague Island on the south-central coast of Alaska. A United States Coast Guard helicopter rescued her three survivors from a life raft.

=== 29 June ===
List of shipwrecks: 29 June 1987
Ship	State	Description
Sea Turtle	United States	The 22-foot (6.7 m) houseboat sank in the western part of Cook Inlet on the south-central coast of Alaska with the loss of both men on board.

== July ==
=== 2 July ===
List of shipwrecks: 2 July 1987
Ship	State	Description
Magi	United States	The 30-foot (9.1 m) fishing vessel sank at "Naked Island" – the name of a number of islands in the area – in southern Alaska.

=== 16 July ===
List of shipwrecks: 17 July 1987
Ship	State	Description
Havel	West Germany	The cargo ship was sunk to create an artificial reef near Boynton Beach, Florida.

=== 17 July ===
List of shipwrecks: 17 July 1987
Ship	State	Description
USS Bausell	United States Navy	The decommissioned Gearing-class destroyer was sunk as a target in the Pacific Ocean.

=== 22 July ===
List of shipwrecks: 22 July 1987
Ship	State	Description
Raketeer	United States	The vessel was abandoned after she ran aground in Alitak Bay (56°50′N 154°10′W) on the south end of Kodiak Island in the Kodiak Archipelago. A United States Coast Guard helicopter rescued her crew of four.

=== 25 July ===
List of shipwrecks: 25 July 1987
Ship	State	Description
Binki	United States	The 43-foot (13.1 m) fishing vessel capsized and sank with the loss of one life south of Admiralty Island in the Alexander Archipelago in Southeast Alaska. Four of her five survivors were rescued on 26 July by two passing fishing vessels, and the fifth was lifted from the water by a United States Coast Guard helicopter.

=== 28 July ===
List of shipwrecks: 28 July 1987
Ship	State	Description
Fearless	Cyprus	On fire and grounded at 37°09′N 122°41′E. Refloated 27 August and scrapped.

=== 29 July ===
List of shipwrecks: 29 July 1987
Ship	State	Description
Marge	United States	The 36-foot (11.0 m) fishing vessel sank at Grand Island (54°58′15″N 132°51′45″W) in Southeast Alaska, southeast of Ketchikan, Alaska.

=== Unknown date ===
List of shipwrecks: Unknown date July 1987
Ship	State	Description
USS McKean	Turkish Navy	The decommissioned Gearing-class destroyer was sunk as a target by a Harpoon missile in the Gulf of Antalya after being transferred to the Turkish Navy and cannibalized for spare parts.

== August ==
=== 13 August ===
List of shipwrecks: 13 August 1987
Ship	State	Description
"Onward Fisher"	United Kingdom	The fishing vessel stranded in Brighouse Bay, 2 miles west of Little Rock, she rolled onto her starboard side after striking a partially submerged rock, a Total Loss.

=== 13 August ===
List of shipwrecks: 13 August 1987
Ship	State	Description
Vega Marie	United States	The 85-foot (26 m) fishing vessel sank in the North Pacific Ocean 50 nautical miles (93 km; 58 mi) south of Unimak Pass, Alaska. Her crew was rescued.

=== 17 August ===
List of shipwrecks: 17 August 1987
Ship	State	Description
Unidentified tank barge	United States	The retired 250-foot (76.2 m) tank barge was scuttled as an artificial reef in the North Atlantic Ocean 6.5 nautical miles (12.0 km; 7.5 mi) off Harvey Cedars, New Jersey, in 80 feet (24 m) of water at 39°37.498′N 074°01.412′W. Her wreck is known as the 'Molasses Barge."

=== 26 August ===
List of shipwrecks: 26 August 1987
Ship	State	Description
Maral R	United Kingdom	Maral R at Seaton Sluice Ran ashore at Seaton Sluice, Northumberland after an engine fire caused the crew to abandon ship.

== September ==
=== 10 September ===
List of shipwrecks: 10 September 1987
Ship	State	Description
Coney Island	United States	The retired 250-foot (76.2 m) sludge tanker was scuttled as an artificial reef in 125 feet (38 m) of water in the North Atlantic Ocean off New Jersey at 40°06.285′N 073°41.365′W.

=== 16 September ===
List of shipwrecks: 16 September 1987
Ship	State	Description
Swenson II	United States	The retired 130-foot (39.6 m) barge was scuttled as an artificial reef in the North Atlantic Ocean 3.6 nautical miles (6.7 km; 4.1 mi) off Sea Girt, New Jersey, at 40°07.305′N 073°56.885′W.

=== 19 September ===
List of shipwrecks: 19 September 1987
Ship	State	Description
Golden Pride	United States	The 83-foot (25.3 m) fishing trawler capsized and sank in Unimak Pass in the Aleutian Islands. Another fishing vessel rescued her crew of four from a life raft.
Nordfjord	United States	During a voyage from Seattle, Washington, to Unimak Pass in the Aleutian Islands, the 127-foot (38.7 m) fishing trawler disappeared with the loss of her entire crew of five after sending out a brief distress message in the Gulf of Alaska approximately 200 nautical miles (370 km; 230 mi) south of Valdez, Alaska.

=== 26 September ===
List of shipwrecks: 26 September 1987
Ship	State	Description
Iran Ajr	Islamic Republic of Iran Navy	The landing craft was scuttled in the Persian Gulf by U.S. forces, five days after she was damaged by United States Army attack helicopters and captured by United States Navy SEALs when U.S. forces detected her laying mines in the Persian Gulf.

== October ==
=== 1 October ===
List of shipwrecks: 1 October 1987
Ship	State	Description
Lora Lee	United States	The fishing vessel sank near Kodiak, Alaska.
Wicklow	United States	A freak 70 mph (110 km/h) wind drove the 28-foot (8.5 m) gillnetter ashore and wrecked her in Astrolabe Bay in Southeast Alaska. A United States Coast Guard helicopter rescued both members of her crew.

=== 16 October ===
List of shipwrecks: 16 October 1987
Ship	State	Description
Hengist	United Kingdom	Great Storm of 1987: The ferry was beached at Folkestone Warren. Her crew were rescued by breeches buoy. Refloated in November, repaired and returned to service.
Sumnea	United Kingdom	Great Storm of 1987: The bulk carrier capsized at Dover, Kent, with the loss of three of her six crew. Survivors were rescued by Rotary Service ( Royal National Lifeboat Institution).

== November ==
=== 5 November ===
List of shipwrecks: 5 November 1987
Ship	State	Description
Uyak II	United States	The 112-foot (34.1 m) fishing trawler sank in the Gulf of Alaska off the south end of Kodiak Island with the loss of four of her six crew members.

=== 7 November ===
List of shipwrecks: 7 November 1987
Ship	State	Description
Aqua II	United States	The retired 110-foot (33.5 m) water barge was scuttled as an artificial reef in the North Atlantic Ocean 6.5 nautical miles (12.0 km; 7.5 mi) off Harvey Cedars, New Jersey, in 80 feet (24 m) of water at 39°37.474′N 074°01.217′W.

=== 14 November ===
List of shipwrecks: 14 November 1987
Ship	State	Description
Peggy Diana	United States	The retired 56-foot (17.1 m) LCM-6-class landing craft mechanized was scuttled as an artificial reef in the North Atlantic Ocean off Cape May, New Jersey, at 38°50.830′N 074°42.510′W.

=== 27 November ===
List of shipwrecks: 27 November 1987
Ship	State	Description
USCGC Duane	United States Coast Guard	The decommissioned Treasury-class cutter was scuttled as an artificial reef off Key Largo, Florida.

=== 28 November ===
List of shipwrecks: 28 November 1987
Ship	State	Description
USCGC Bibb	United States Coast Guard	The decommissioned Treasury-class cutter was scuttled as an artificial reef 1 nautical mile (1.2 mi; 1.9 km) south of Molasses Reef near Key Largo, Florida.

=== 30 November ===
List of shipwrecks: 30 November 1987
Ship	State	Description
SAS Haerlem	South African Navy	The decommissioned Ford-class seaward defence boat was scuttled as an artificial reef off Humewood Beach, Port Elizabeth, South Africa.

== December ==
=== 5 December ===
List of shipwrecks: 5 December 1987
Ship	State	Description
Cason	Panama	The cargo ship caught fire off Galicia, Spain and was beached off Cape Finisterre with the loss of 23 of her 31 crew.

=== 7 December ===
List of shipwrecks: 7 December 1987
Ship	State	Description
Hydro Atlantic	United States Army	The decommissioned United States Army Corps of Engineers dredge foundered from leaks and sank 1 mile (1.6 km) off Boca Raton, Florida while going to Texas for scrapping.

=== 8 December ===
List of shipwrecks: 8 December 1987
Ship	State	Description
Vitautas Putna	Soviet Union	The factory ship caught fire at 45°04′N 8°09′W and abandoned by her crew with the loss of two lives.

=== 10 December ===
List of shipwrecks: 10 December 1987
Ship	State	Description
Bluebird	United States	The 46-foot (14.0 m) fishing vessel sank approximately 12 nautical miles (22 km; 14 mi) southwest of Sitka, Alaska, in a snowstorm with 70-mile-per-hour (110 km/h) winds and 30-foot (9.1 m) seas. A United States Coast Guard helicopter rescued both people – a man and his six-year-old son – on board.

=== 12 December ===
List of shipwrecks: 12 December 1987
Ship	State	Description
Samson	Malta	Samson Crane barge, ran aground at Rams Head, Ardmore, County Waterford, after tow parted in rough seas.

=== 20 December ===
List of shipwrecks: 20 December 1987
Ship	State	Description
Doña Paz & Vector	Philippines	The passenger ferry and oil tanker both sank in the Tablas Strait in the Philippines after colliding, killing 4,341 people.

=== 24 December ===
List of shipwrecks: 24 December 1987
Ship	State	Description
The Christian	Flag unknown	The coastal tanker ran aground at Sands of Forvie, Grampian, United Kingdom. Later refloated.

=== 31 December ===
List of shipwrecks: 31 December 1987
Ship	State	Description
Windy Sea	United States	The 32-foot (9.8 m) seiner, longliner, and crabber sank in the Gulf of Alaska off Kodiak, Alaska. Her crew survived.

== Unknown date ==
List of shipwrecks: Unknown date 1987
Ship	State	Description
Kvingo	United States	The 38-foot (11.6 m) halibut fishing vessel sank in Southeast Alaska during a gale. The United States Coast Guard rescued her crew of two.
Scotia Cape	Canada	The 36-metre (118.1 ft) seiner/trawler sank in rough seas near the Queen Charlotte Islands. The ship and seven crew left dock on 27 January and was last sighted in the Goletas Channel. The search lasted for eight days, but no trace was found.
