= List of maritime disasters in the 20th century =

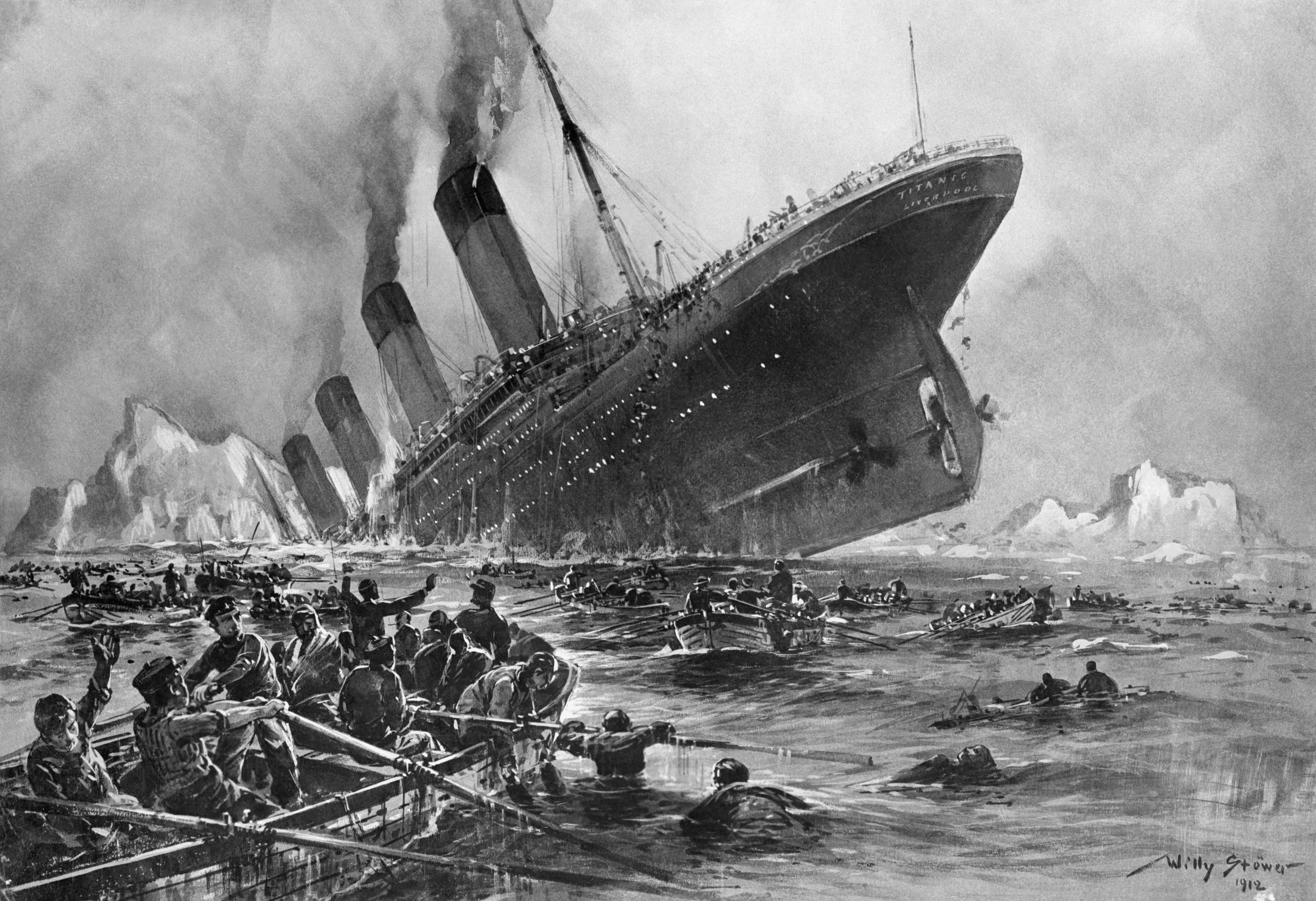
The RMS Titanic sinking on 15 April 1912 is arguably the most infamous maritime disaster of the 20th century, if not of all time, due to the circumstances leading up to the disaster as well as its aftermath which led to major reforms in maritime regulations and safety at sea.

A maritime disaster is an event which usually involves a ship or ships and can involve military action. Because of the nature of maritime travel, there is often a substantial loss of life. The term maritime disaster can refer to both commercial ships and military naval ships. A maritime disaster can result in one or more of the following simultaneously;

- Loss of life
- Pollution of marine environment (in case of oil spill, foul discharge of materials, sulphur emitted from fuels, etc.)
- Degradation of the aquatic ecosystem
- Economic loss at a grand scale
- Destruction of onshore properties (accidents at harbor are not only limited to the vessels but also damage the nearest lands)

There are countless incidents reported on marine disasters.

The sinking of the British ocean liner RMS Titanic in 1912, is arguably the most infamous shipwreck, but not the most catastrophic in terms of lives lost. The wartime sinking of the German Wilhelm Gustloff in January 1945 in World War II by a Soviet Navy submarine, with an estimated loss of about 9,400 people, remains the deadliest isolated maritime disaster ever. (Note: Excluding such events as the destruction of entire fleets like the 1274 and 1281 storms that are said to have devastated Kublai Khan's fleets in his invasions of Japan.) The 1987 loss of the Philippine ferry Doña Paz, with an estimated 4,386 dead, is the largest peacetime loss recorded.

== Peacetime ==
All ships, including those of the military, are vulnerable to problems from weather conditions, faulty design or human error. The disasters listed below were not related directly to military action, though some of them occurred during periods of conflict. The table listings are in decreasing order with respect to the number of casualties.

| Year | Country | Description | Deaths | Image |
|---|---|---|---|---|
| 1987 | Philippines | Doña Paz – Late on 20 December, while bound for Manila from Tacloban, the passenger ferry collided with the oil tanker MT Vector in the Tablas Strait near Marinduque. The collision ignited the Vector's cargo and the fire spread to the Doña Paz; both ships burned and sank. Though Doña Paz was certified to only carry 1,518 passengers, thousands more were crammed on board and unlisted on its manifest. Except for 26 passengers, everyone on the Doña Paz died, including its crew of 58; while on the Vector only 2 of its 13 crew survived. The combined death toll from both ships is estimated at 4,386, making the incident the deadliest peacetime maritime disaster in history. | 4,386 | |
| 1991 | Egypt | Salem Express – At midnight between 14–15 December, while on a voyage from Jeddah, Saudi Arabia to Safaga, Egypt, with at least 644 passengers, the ship struck a reef and sank within 10–20 minutes. The majority of passengers were Moroccan-French. Most were returning from pilgrimage to Mecca. The official death toll was 470, though some evidence suggests that the ship was overcrowded and the true death toll may have been much greater, likely more than 1,600. | 1,600 (estimated) | |
| 1993 | Haiti | Ferry Neptune – Sank on 16 February. | 1,500 (estimated) | |
| 1912 | United Kingdom | RMS Titanic – A British ocean liner and, at the time, the world's largest ship. On 14 April, on its maiden voyage, it struck an iceberg, buckling part of its hull and causing it to sink during the early hours of 15th April. Approximately 712 people survived out of the 2,208 passengers and crew. Her loss was the catalyst for major reforms in maritime regulations and safety at sea. The sinking is arguably the most famous maritime disaster, being the subject of numerous media portrayals. | 1,496 (Note: The figures have been revised, officially and unofficially, many times since 1912. Most researchers and historians concede that they will never know exactly how many people died and survived. More recent, painstaking calculations and research has reached a conclusion of 1,496 fatalities and 712 survivors.) | |
| 1954 | Japan | Toya Maru – A train ferry that sank in Typhoon Marie in the Tsugaru Strait between Hokkaido and Honshu on 26 September. It is said that 1,153 people aboard were killed but the exact number of fatalities remains unknown because some victims managed to board without tickets and others cancelled their passage just before sailing. | 1,153 | |
| 1904 | United States | General Slocum – The paddle steamer caught fire and sank in New York City's East River on 15 June. 1,029 people were killed, making it New York City's greatest loss of life until the September 11 attacks. Further information: General Slocum disaster | 1,021 | |
| 1914 | Canada | RMS Empress of Ireland – On 29 May the passenger liner sank after colliding with the cargo ship Storstad on the Saint Lawrence River, killing 1,012 people. About 465 survived. | 1,012 | |
| 1912 | Japan | Kiche Maru – Sank in a typhoon in the Pacific on 22 September. It is estimated that more than 1,000 persons died. | 1,000+ | |
| 1921 | Singapore | Hong Moh – On 3 March, the ship struck the White Rocks on Lamock Island near Swatow (Shantou) on the southern coast of China. It broke in two and sank killing about 1,000 of the 1,100 people aboard. | 1,000 (estimated) | |
| 1927 | Japan | Wusung – On 16 September, 900 Japanese workers died when the steamship, bound for Kamchatka, sank off the Kuril Islands. | 900 (estimated) | |
| 1994 | Estonia | Estonia – the Roll-on/roll-off ferry sank in heavy seas on 28 September. An investigation concluded that the failure of the bow visor door allowed water from the Baltic Sea to enter the ship. 852 people were killed; 137 survived. | 852 | |
| 1915 | United States | Eastland – On 24 July, while moored to the dock in the Chicago River, the capacity load of passengers shifted to the river side of the ship causing it to roll over, killing 845 passengers and crew. | 845 | |
| 1996 | Tanzania | Bukoba – The overloaded ferry sank on 21 May on Lake Victoria. While the ship's manifest showed 443 aboard, it is estimated that about 800 people died in the sinking, making it the deadliest maritime disaster in the Southern Hemisphere. | 800 (estimated) | |
| 1939 | Soviet Union | Indigirka – On 12 December the GULAG prisoner transport ship Indigirka ran aground and rolled on its side in shallow water during a blizzard off the Japanese coast near Sarufutsu while trying to enter the La Perouse Strait. While most of the crew and passengers were rescued an additional three days passed before a rescue of the trapped prisoners in the cargo holds could begin. Only 28 of the more than 700 prisoners were found alive with one of the 28 rescued later dying. | 741 | |
| 1902 | United Kingdom | Camorta – The ship was caught in a cyclone and sank in the Irrawaddy Delta on 6 May with the loss of all 655 passengers and 82 crew. It was en route from Madras, India, to Rangoon, Burma, across the Bay of Bengal. | 737 | |
| 1914 | United Kingdom | HMS Bulwark – On 26 November, a powerful internal explosion ripped it apart at 7:50 am while it was moored at Number 17 buoy in Kethole Reach, 4 mi (6.4 km) west of Sheerness in the River Medway estuary. All of its officers were killed, and out of its complement of 750, 14 survived; two of these subsequently died of wounds in hospital. | 736 | |
| 1904 | Denmark | Norge – On 28 June the ship ran aground on Helen's Reef near Rockall. 635 people were killed; 160 survivors spent as much as eight days in open boats before rescue. | 635 | Norge |
| 1947 | India | Ramdas – On 17 July the ship capsized 10 miles (16 km) off Mumbai, killing 625 people aboard. The wreck became known only as survivors swam ashore. | 625 | |
| 1918 | Japan | Kawachi – On July 12, The battleship capsized after a magazine explosion in Tokuyama Bay, Shunan, Yamaguchi Prefecture, Japan, according to Japanese government official confirmed reported, | 621 | Kawachi |
| 1955 | Soviet Union | Novorossiysk – On 29 October, the battleship was moored in Sevastopol Bay, 300 metres (330 yd) from shore and opposite a hospital. At 01:30 hrs there was an explosion, after which the ship capsized and sank with the loss of 608 men. The official investigation concluded that the explosion had been caused by a German mine left from the Second World War. | 608 | Novorossiysk |
| 1947 | United States | Grandcamp – On 16 April, the French-registered Liberty ship caught fire and exploded dockside while being loaded with ammonium nitrate at Texas City, Texas. In what came to be called the Texas City Disaster an estimated 581 people, including all of the ship's crew and 28 firefighters, were killed and about 5,000 injured. | 581 | |
| 1981 | Indonesia | Tampomas II – On 27 January the ocean liner, carrying more people than its capacity limit of 1,137, sank in the Java Sea after a fire and explosion. At least 580 people were killed and 515 rescued. | 580 | |
| 1920 | France | SS Afrique – The passenger ship sank on 9 January in the Bay of Biscay in bad weather. It was carrying 602 passengers and crew, of whom only 34 were saved. | 568 | |
| 1986 | Bangladesh | Shamia – On 25 May the double deck river ferry, carrying about 1,000 people, capsized in the Meghna River 135 miles (217 km) south of Dhaka in a storm. An estimated 500-600 people were killed. | 500–600 | |
| 1932 | France | Georges Philippar was an ocean liner of the French Messageries Maritimes line that was built in 1930. On its maiden voyage it caught fire and sank in the Gulf of Aden with the loss of 520 lives. | 52 | |
| 1919 | Spain | Valbanera – the steamship sank in the Gulf of Mexico 45 mi (72 km) west of Key West, Florida, in a hurricane in September. All of the 488 crew and passengers were killed. | 488 | |
| 2000 | Indonesia | Cahaya Bahari – On 29 June the overloaded ferry carrying refugees from the Maluku Islands sank in a storm. Of the 491 aboard, 10 were rescued. | 481 | |
| 1944 | Japan | Tarumizu Maru 6 – On February 6, the ship was over-capacity and sank while trying to change direction, throwing off the ship's balance, in Kagoshima Bay, Tarumizu, Kagoshima Prefecture, according to Japanese government official confirmed report, | 464 | |
| 1916 | Spain | Príncipe de Asturias – Sank near the island of Sao Sebastiao, Brazil, on 5 March. At least 445 out of 588 aboard were killed. | 445 | |
| 1975 | China | On 4 August, two passenger ships Hongxing 245 and Hongxing 240, on overnight trips between Guangzhou and Zhaoqing, collided and sank on the Zhujiang River, 432 of the 800 people aboard were killed. | 432 | |
| 1986 | Soviet Union | Admiral Nakhimov – On 31 August the ship collided with the bulk carrier Pyotr Vasyov in Tsemes Bay, near the port of Novorossiysk, Russian SFSR. 423 of the 1,234 people aboard were killed. | 423 | |
| 1988 | India | A reported 400 people were killed when an unnamed passenger ferry struck a sand bar and capsized in the Ganges River. | 400 (estimated) | |
| 1988 | Philippines | Doña Marilyn – On the afternoon of 24 October, while sailing from Manila to Tacloban City, the vessel was caught in Typhoon Unsang and sank leaving 389 people dead and 147 survivors. Doña Marilyn was a sister ship of Doña Paz which sank a year earlier in the deadliest ever peace-time maritime disaster. | 389 | |
| 1999 | Indonesia | KM Bismas Raya 2 – In October the ferry KM Bismas Raya 2 caught fire, capsized and sank while off the coast of Merauke. A reported 361 people were killed. | 361 | |
| 1918 | United States | Princess Sophia – On 23 October the passenger steamship ran aground on Vanderbilt Reef in Lynn Canal near Juneau, Alaska. Rescue ships were unable to assist due to the continuing storm, and it sank on the night of 25 October. The only survivor found was a pet dog. The sinking of the SS Princess Sophia is to this day the worst maritime accident in the history of British Columbia and Alaska. | 343 | |
| 1970 | South Korea | Namyoung-ho – The ferry sank on 15 December. It was carrying 338 people, who were traveling from Busan to Jeju; 326 people killed. See Sinking of Namyoung-Ho | 326 | |
| 1927 | Italy | Principessa Mafalda – On 25 October, the ocean liner sank off the coast of Brazil after its propeller shaft fractured and damaged its hull. It sank slowly in the presence of rescue vessels, but panic among passengers and crew caused the deaths of 314 of the 1,265 aboard. | 314 | |
| 1999 | China | Dashun – On 24 November the ferry caught fire, broke apart and sank in rough seas off Yantai in eastern China. Of 336 aboard, 22 are known to have survived. | 314 | |
| 1999 | Indonesia | Harta Rimba – On 7 February the ferry foundered and sank after being struck by a large wave while drifting with engine problems. Of the 332 aboard 19 were rescued two days after the sinking by a passing ship. A distress signal was not sent out and the sinking was unknown until the survivors were found. | 313 | |
| 1945 | Japan | Sekirei Maru – According to Japan Coast Guard official reported, Awaji Island to Akashi route boat was overturned by heavy winds. Although fishing boats operating in the vicinity rescued 45 people, the captain of the doomed ship refused to be rescued, in Akashi Strait, Hyōgo Prefecture. | 304 | |
| 1911 | France | Liberté – battleship that suffered an accidental ammunition explosion; about 300 people were killed. | 300 | |
| 1981 | Brazil | Sobral Santos II The sinking was one of the worst maritime tragedies in the history of the Amazon River. | 300 (estimated) | |
| 1906 | Italy | Sirio – On 4 August the cargo steamship sank after running aground and suffered a boiler explosion on the Punta Hormigas, a reef off Hormigas Island, two and a half miles east of Cape Palos, Cartagena, Spain. 293, including Italian and Spanish emigrants bound for Argentina, of the 645 aboard were lost. Other sources put the death toll at over 500. | 293–500 | |
| 1993 | South Korea | Seohae Ferry – was a passenger ship that sank near Wi-do island, Jeolla Province. The ship was carrying 362 passengers (141 more than its capacity) and heavy freight in bad weather. | 292 | |
| 1996 | Malta | F174 – Severely overloaded and poorly maintained ship carrying migrants from South Asia, sank 19 miles off Portopalo di Capo Passero in Sicily. | 283+ | |
| 1958 | Turkey | Üsküdar – A small passenger ferry sank due to heavy lodos weather in the Gulf of İzmit on 1 March. 272 passengers including seven crew died; 39 people survived. | 272 | |
| 1994 | Kenya | Likoni Ferry – On 29 April the overloaded passenger ferry Mtongwe One capsized and sank killing 272 people of the more than 300 aboard. | 272 | |
| 1928 | Chile | Angamos – On 6 July it sailed bound for Talcahuano and sank off Punta Morguillas Lebu. Of the 269 people aboard 262 were lost and seven rescued. It was the second largest single maritime loss of life in the history of Chile. | 262 | |
| 1996 | Indonesia | Gurita – On 19 January the ferry sunk during a strong storm six miles from Sabang. Of those on board, between 260 and 340 were killed and 47 survived. | 260-340 | |
| 1913 | United States | Great Lakes Storm of 1913 – A cyclonic blizzard (sometimes referred to as an inland hurricane) on the Great Lakes that occurred between 7 and 10 November. In total 12 ships were sunk with a combined crew loss of 255. An additional seven ships were damaged beyond repair; 19 more ships that had been stranded were later salvaged. | 255 | |
| 1961 | United Kingdom | Dara – sank in the Persian Gulf on 8 April, as a result of a powerful explosion that killed 238 of the 819 people aboard including 19 officers and 113 crew. The explosion is believed to have been caused by an explosive device placed aboard. | 238 | |
| 1966 | Greece | Heraklion – a car ferry that capsized and sank on 8 December in the Aegean Sea in a storm. An unsecured vehicle damaged the loading door resulting in sea water entering the vessel. The sinking resulted in the death of 234 people out of 281 aboard. | 234 | |
| 1970 | Saint Christopher-Nevis-Anguilla | MV Christena – An overloaded passenger ferry boat that sank crossing the channel between the islands of St. Kitts and Nevis, Leeward Islands. | 233 | |
| 1953 | South Korea | Changgyeong – The ferry sank on 5 January. It was cruising from Yeosu to Busan. | 229 | |
| 1921 | Russian SFSR | Sovnarkom – on 10 May crashed into Novosibirsk railway bridge and sank in the Ob River, resulting in the death of at least 225 (according to other estimates, 400). | 225–400 | |
| 1906 | Brazil | Aquidabã – an ironclad warship built during the mid-1880s. On 21 January, the powder magazine of the ship exploded, sinking it within three minutes. 212 people were lost. | 212 | |
| 1909 | United Kingdom | Waratah – About 27 July, the steamship, en route from Australia to London, was lost without trace off Durban on the east coast of South Africa. All 211 aboard were lost. | 211 | |
| 1908 | Japan | Matsushima – On 30 April the cruiser Matsushima, while returning from a training cruise and anchored at Mako in the Pescadores islands off Taiwan, had an accidental explosion occur in its ammunition magazine. Matsushima rolled over onto its starboard side and then sank stern-first. 206 of her 350 crew were lost. | 206 | |
| 1919 | United Kingdom | Iolaire – (Scottish Gaelic for "Eagle") was an Admiralty yacht that hit rocks and sank on 1 January just off the Isle of Lewis, while carrying soldiers coming home from World War I. At least 205 of the 280 men aboard were lost. | 205 | |
| 1988 | Bangladesh | Haisal – On 27 December the passenger ferry sank after being rammed from behind by a cargo ship on the Dhaleshwari River killing 200 people. | 200 | |
| 1987 | United Kingdom | Herald of Free Enterprise – Capsized and sank on 6 March due to taking on water just minutes after leaving the harbour at Zeebrugge in Belgium. The doors to the car decks were left open by the Assistant Bosun, Mark Stanley, causing the ferry to take on water and quickly capsize. Of the 539 aboard, 193 passengers and crew died. | 193 | |
| 1983 | Soviet Union | Aleksandr Suvorov – on 5 June the ship struck a girder of the Ulyanovsk railway bridge. The collision caused 177 deaths yet the ship stayed afloat, was restored and is still in use. | 177 | |
| 1980 | Philippines | Don Juan – On 22 April the luxury liner collided with an oil tanker Tacloban off Tablas Strait in Mindoro and sank 15 minutes later at a depth of 1,800 feet. The vessel was carrying 1,004 passengers but was only cleared to carry 864 persons including its crew. | 176 | |
| 1952 | United States | USS Hobson – On the night of 26 April, Hobson was steaming in formation with carrier USS Wasp (CV-18) about 600 miles (1000 kilometers) west of the Azores. The Hobson crossed the carrier's bow and was promptly struck amidships. The force of the collision rolled the destroyer-minesweeper over, breaking it in two. USS Rodman (DD-456) and the Wasp rescued many survivors but the ship and 176 of its crew were killed. | 176 | |
| 1985 | China | On 19 August an overloaded ferry operated by drunk pilots capsized in the Songhua River, 174 of the 234 people aboard were lost. | 174 | |
| 1914 | Newfoundland | Southern Cross – Lost with all 173 crew in a storm between 31 March and 3 April. Believed to be near Cape Pine, Newfoundland. | 173 | |
| 1958 | Japan | Nankai Maru - On January 26, a Wakayama to Komatsushima route passenger ferry sank off Kii Channel, Japan. All 139 passengers and 28 crew were drowned, according to Japan Coast Guard official confirmed report. | 167 | |
| 1955 | Japan | Shiun Maru – 11 May. Collided in dense fog with sister ship Uko Maru in the Seto Inland Sea and sank with the loss of 166 passengers and two crew members. | 166 | |
| 1990 | Denmark | Scandinavian Star – caught fire en route between Norway and Denmark, killing 159 people. | 159 | |
| 1981 | Brazil | Novo Amapá - On January 6, the ferry left Santana, Amapá, with 600 passengers. The ship was overcrownded and capsized at Almeirim. The exact number of fatalities remains unknown, but it is estimated between 150 and 300. | 150-300 | |
| 1991 | Somalia | Christiana Hama – On March 2, the dhow Christiana Hama sank off the coast of Malindi, Kenya, after striking a rock. The small freighter, which reports indicate left the port city of Kismayo on February 26, was excessively overloaded with an estimated 600–700 Somali refugees fleeing the civil war. Approximately 150 people drowned. | 150 | |
| 1998 | Philippines | Princess of the Orient – On 18 September, the ferry, while travelling from Manila to Cebu, sailed into Typhoon Vicki. It capsized at 12:55 pm near Fortune Island in Batangas. Of 388 passengers aboard, an estimated 150 died. Passengers floated in the sea for more than 12 hours before rescuers were able to reach the survivors. | 150 | |
| 1907 | United States | Larchmont – On 12 February, the paddle steamer sank off Block Island, Rhode Island, after colliding with the schooner Harry Knowlton. About 150 of the people 200 aboard were killed. | 150–200 | |
| 1912 | United Kingdom | Koombana – disappeared on 20 March north of Port Hedland, Western Australia, in a tropical cyclone with the loss of about 76 passengers and 74 crew. | 150 | |
| 1989 | Romania | Mogoșoaia – On 10 January the ferry collided with a tug boat on the Danube River near Galați. Of those on board, between 151 and 239 were killed and 16 to 18 survived. | 151-239 | |
| 1950 | Soviet Union | Majakovskis Riga – sank in the Daugava River on 13 August, 147 died. | 147 | |
| 1994 | Philippines | Cebu City – On 2 December, the ferry collided with a Singaporean freighter Kota Suria and sank in Manila Bay killing 140 people. | 140 | |
| 1991 | Italy | Moby Prince – On 10 April, the ferry collided with the oil tanker Agip Abruzzo in Livorno harbour and caught fire, killing 140 of the 141 people aboard. | 140 | |
| 1934 | United States | Morro Castle (1930) – During the early morning hours of 8 September, while en route from Havana to New York, the passenger liner caught fire and burned, killing 137 passengers and crew members out of the 549 aboard. The ship was beached near Asbury Park, New Jersey, and remained there for several months until it was eventually towed away and sold for scrap. | 137 | |
| 1929 | Finland | Kuru – Passenger steamer sank after capsizing in high winds on 7 September in Lake Näsijärvi near Tampere. An estimated 136–138 people were lost. | 136–138 | |
| 1901 | United States | City of Rio de Janeiro – en route from Hong Kong, this passenger ship sank on 21 February after striking a submerged reef at the entry to San Francisco Bay, killing more than 135 passengers and crew. | 135 | |
| 1953 | United Kingdom | Princess Victoria – Sank on 31 January in the North Channel (between Scotland and Northern Ireland), in a severe storm killing 133 people. Its sinking had the greatest death toll in UK waters since World War II. | 133 | |
| 1957 | West Germany | Pamir – On 21 September the four-masted barque was caught in Hurricane Carrie and sank off the Azores with six survivors rescued of 138 aboard. | 132 | |
| 1913 | Canada | Volturno – On 9 October the steamship, carrying mostly immigrants bound for New York, caught fire in a gale in the North Atlantic. 520 people were rescued. About 130 people, most of them women and children in lifeboats launched unsuccessfully, were killed. | 130 | |
| 1963 | United States | USS Thresher (SSN-593) – A nuclear-powered attack submarine that sank on deep-diving tests on 10 April about 220 nautical miles (410 km) east of Boston, Massachusetts. | 129 | |
| 1963 | Greece | TSMS Lakonia – Caught fire and burned in the Atlantic Ocean on 22 December. 128 people died, of whom 95 were passengers and 33 were crew members. 53 people were killed by the fire. The rest died from exposure, drowning, and injuries sustained while diving overboard. | 128 | |
| 1907 | United Kingdom | Berlin – On 21 February the steamship was driven onto the granite breakwater at the New Waterway ship canal in the Netherlands by large waves and then broke apart. Of 144 people aboard, 128 were lost. | 128 | |
| 1905 | United Kingdom | Hilda – A steamship on a cross-Channel run that sank killing 125 people. | 125 | |
| 1911 | Australia | Yongala – The ship sank off Cape Bowling Green, Australia, after steaming into a cyclone. There were no survivors of the 122 aboard. | 122 | |
| 1973 | Malaysia | Pulau Kidjang – On 26 December, the passenger ferry sank in the Rejang River near Tanjung Jerijeh, Sarawak, 3.5 nautical miles (6.5 km) west of Sarikei in the monsoon season. Of 159 people were aboard, 38 were saved including 18 sailors. 41 bodies were found. | 121 | |
| 1907 | France | Iéna – On 12 March, while in drydock in the Missiessy Basin at Toulon, the battleship suffered a series of internal explosions in her magazine. The first explosion was caused by Powder B, a nitrocellulose-based propellant in the ammunition, which tended to become unstable with age, and self-ignite. The explosion killed 120 people including two civilians hit by fragments in the suburb of Le Pont Du Las. | 120 | |
| 1908 | Malta | Sardinia – The passenger-cargo ship burst into flames minutes after leaving the Grand Harbour, and ran aground off Fort Ricasoli. Only 33 people on board survived, and at least 118 were killed. | 118+ | |
| 1949 | Canada | Noronic – Caught fire at the dockside in Toronto Harbour on 16 September. Estimates ranged from 118 to 139 fatalities. Most of the deaths were from suffocation or burns. However, some died from being trampled or from leaping off the upper decks onto the pier; only one person drowned. | 118–139 | |
| 2000 | Russian Navy | Kursk – The submarine, one of the Russian navy's most advanced vessels, sank in the Barents Sea on 12 August with the loss of all 118 people on board. An explosion of fuel from an old torpedo caused the disaster. | 118 | |
| 1906 | United States | Valencia – Shortly before midnight on 22 January, it struck a reef near Pachena Point on the southwest coast of Vancouver Island and sank. Estimates of the number of people killed vary widely. Some sources list it at 117; others claim it was as high as 181. According to the federal report, the official death toll was 136. 37 men survived, but every woman and child aboard was lost. | 117–181 | |
| 1928 | United Kingdom | Vestris – On 12 November the ship began listing about 200 nautical miles (370 km) off Hampton Roads, Virginia, was abandoned, and sank killing more than 100 people. | 110 | |
| 1908 | United States | Star of Bengal – On 20 September, in the beginning of its return trip from Fort Wrangell to San Francisco, the ship was in tow into the open sea when it encountered a storm. The ship struck the rocks near the shore of Coronation Island and sunk, killing approximately 110 of 138 people aboard. | 110 | |
| 1940 | Italy | Orazio – On 21 January the passenger liner caught fire and burned 35 miles off Toulon, France. 48 of the 423 passengers and 60 of the 210 crew died in the fire. | 108 | |
| 1946 | Soviet Union | Dalstroy – The Soviet steamer operating during the 1930s and 1940s from the port of Nakhodka to Magadan and delivering cargo and prisoners to Kolyma, exploded on July 24 (Dalstroy explosion), during the loading of ammonal in Nakhodka, due to gross safety violations. The explosion resulted in the death of 105 people, as well as significant property damage and environmental pollution. | 105 | |
| 1954 | United States | USS Bennington – At 06:11 on 26 May, while cruising off Narragansett Bay, the fluid in one of its aircraft catapults leaked out and was detonated by the flames of a jet causing the forward part of the flight deck to explode, setting off a series of secondary explosions which killed 103 crewmen, predominantly among the senior NCO's of the crew and injured 201 others.^{[1]}Bennington proceeded under its own power to Naval Air Station Quonset Point, Rhode Island, to land the injured. This tragedy caused the Navy to switch from hydraulic catapults to steam catapults for launching aircraft. A monument to the sailors who died in this tragic event was erected near the southwest corner of Fort Adams State Park in Newport, Rhode Island. | 103 | |
| 1939 | United Kingdom | HMS Thetis – A T-class submarine that sank in Liverpool Bay on 1 June after inadvertent opening of both doors of a torpedo tube to the sea whilst diving. 99 people were killed, including shipyard workers who were aboard for sea trials. Raised and refitted, as HMS Thunderbolt the boat was later sunk by Italian anti-submarine forces in the Mediterranean Sea during March 1943. | 99 | |
| 1968 | United States | USS Scorpion (SSN-589) – A nuclear-powered submarine that sank (due most likely to an internal explosion) on 22 May 460 nautical miles (850 km) southwest of the Azores in the Atlantic Ocean. | 99 | |
| 1933 | Soviet Union | The Fourth disaster – a boat sank in the Volga near Yaroslavl on 9 July. At least 98 died. | 98 | |
| 1959 | Denmark | Hans Hedtoft – The liner was sailing from Greenland when it struck an iceberg and sank on 30 January. There were 40 crew members and 55 passengers aboard. No-one survived. It was on its maiden voyage and was said to be "unsinkable" due to its strong design. | 95 | |
| 1911 | France | SS Emir – On 9 August the steamship was struck and sunk by the British steamship Silverton in dense fog in the Strait of Gibraltar off the coast of Tarifa, Spain. 71 passengers and 24 crew members were killed while 15 passengers and 12 crew members were rescued. | 95 | |
| 1918 | Newfoundland | Florizel – Sank after striking a reef at Horn Head Point Cape Race near Cappahayden, Newfoundland, on 23 February. Of 144 people aboard, 94 were killed. | 94 | |
| 1989 | Thailand | Seacrest – the Unocal drilling ship capsized in the Gulf of Thailand on 3 November in Typhoon Gay. 91 of its crew complement of 97 were lost. | 91 | |
| 1916 | United Kingdom | Connemara – On 3 November the ferry sank at the entrance to Carlingford Lough, County Louth, Ireland after being hit amidships by the coal ship Retriever which also sank. All 82 aboard the Connemara were killed, and only one crew member of the Retriever's crew of nine were rescued. | 90 | |
| 1965 | Panama | Yarmouth Castle – The steamship's loss in a disastrous fire prompted new laws for safety at sea. 87 people were killed, three of the rescued passengers later died in hospital, bringing the death toll to 90. | 90 | |
| 1907 | United States | Columbia – A little more than 20 minutes past midnight on 21 July, the passenger steamship collided with the steam schooner San Pedro in dense fog sinking in less than 9 minutes, killing 88 people, including all children aboard. The sinking of Columbia partially caused public outrage against American operated Pacific coastal steamships. | 88 | |
| 1922 | Mexico | Topolobampo – In November, the 36-ton steamer left Guaymas carrying 125 passengers bound for the cotton fields of Mexicali. Around midnight at the end of 18 November, the vessel was hit by a nearly 15-foot tidal bore traveling up the Colorado River. 86 people drowned; 21 bodies were recovered. 39 survivors were found. | 86 | |
| 1982 | Canada | Ocean Ranger – On 15 February a semi-submersible mobile offshore drilling unit sank on the Grand Banks of Newfoundland, 267 kilometres (166 mi) east of St. John's, Newfoundland with the loss of all 84 crew members. | 84 | |
| 1997 | Albania | Kateri i Radës – On 28 March the ship sank after a collision with the Italian naval vessel Sibilia in the Strait of Otranto. Of the 142 on board, 83 lost their lives. | 83 | |
| 1964 | Australia | HMAS Voyager – On 10 February, while undergoing post-refitting exercises, the destroyer was rammed and sunk off Jervis Bay, New South Wales, by the aircraft carrier HMAS Melbourne, which was also performing post-refitting exercises. 82 of the 314 people aboard Voyager were lost; Australia's largest peacetime loss of military personnel. | 82 | |
| 2000 | Greece | Express Samina – On 26 September, the roll-on/roll-off ferry hit a reef and sank at 23:02 hrs near the island of Paros. Of the 534 people aboard (473 passengers and 61 crew), 82 were lost. | 82 | |
| 1953 | Turkey | TCG Dumlupınar – On 4 April, the submarine sank with all crew after colliding with the Swedish freighter Naboland in the Dardanelles. | 81 | |
| 1981 | Philippines | Datu Kalantiaw – a Philippine Navy destroyer escort driven aground by Typhoon Clara on 21 September. 79 of its 97 crew were killed. | 79 | |
| 1976 | United States | George Prince – On 20 October, a small automobile ferry crossing the Mississippi River in Louisiana collided with the tanker Frosta, capsized and sank. Of 96 people aboard, 78 were lost. | 78 | |
| 1929 | United States | San Juan – On the night of 29 August, the coastal liner, outbound from San Francisco bound for Los Angeles, collided in dense fog with the oil tanker S.C.T. Dodd in the Pacific Ocean north of Monterey. The ageing San Juan was a poorly-maintained 47-year-old wrought iron steamship, allowing the Dodd to cut halfway into its stern and destroyed a lifeboat. The San Juan capsized to port and sank stern first in less than three minutes killing 77 people. Most of the survivors were dragged down with the sinking ship only to swim free of the sinking vessel during the final plunge. The San Juan sinking helped end of the use of coastal passenger steamships. | 77 | |
| 1978 | Singapore | Spyros – On 12 October, while undergoing repairs dockside, the Greek tanker exploded at the Jurong Shipyard killing 76 people. | 76 | |
| 1909 | New Zealand | Penguin – On 12 February, the inter-island ferry hit a rock near the entrance to Wellington Harbour, sinking then exploding when water entered its boiler room. Of the 105 people aboard, 75 died. | 75 | |
| 1951 | United Kingdom | HMS Affray – an Amphion-class submarine that disappeared on 16 April on a training exercise in the English Channel, killing all 75 crew. It is the last Royal Navy submarine to have been lost at sea. | 75 | |
| 1928 | Denmark | København – a five-masted barque used as a naval training vessel until it disappeared with 75 aboard after 22 December. Built by the Danish East Asiatic Company in 1921, it was the world's largest sailing ship at the time, and served primarily for sail training of young cadets. | 75 | |
| 1969 | United States | USS Frank E. Evans – On 3 June, while operating as an airplane guard for the Australian aircraft carrier HMAS Melbourne in the SEATO training exercise Sea Spirit, the destroyer crossed the bows of the carrier and was rammed and sunk. Of the 273 aboard Evans, 74 died. The management of the inquiry into the collision was seen as detrimental to United States–Australia relations. | 74 | |
| 1995 | Philippines | Viva Antipolo VII – On 16 May the ferry caught fire and sank in the vicinity of Lucena, Quezon. Of the 214 people aboard, 62 were killed and 10 were missing in the accident. | 72 | |
| 1972 | United Kingdom | STV Royston Grange – The British cargo liner was destroyed by fire after a collision with the petroleum tanker Tien Chee in the Rio de la Plata on 11 May. There were no survivors from the 72 people aboard. | 72 | |
| 1996 | Philippines | Gretchen I – On 19 February the overloaded ferry capsized and sank off Cadiz with the loss of 71 people. There were at least 141 survivors. | 71 | |
| 1925 | United Kingdom | HMS M1 – The submarine sank with all crew (69) on 12 November after being struck by the Swedish ship Vidar while submerged in the English Channel. | 69 | |
| 1989 | Guatemala | Justo Rufino Barrios II – On 1 January the ferry sank in Amatique Bay whilst being towed by a Guatemalan Navy vessel, after running out of fuel, with the loss of 67 lives. It was reported that the ship was overloaded with passengers at the time of the accident. | 67 | |
| 1901 | United Kingdom | HMS Cobra – the destroyer's brief career ended when it broke its back and sank near Cromer on 18 September. 67 men were lost; 12 saved. | 67 | |
| 1950 | United Kingdom | HMS Truculent – The T-class submarine sank in the Thames Estuary on 12 January after colliding with the Swedish oil tanker Divina. A total of 64 people died, most in freezing cold mid-winter conditions after escaping the collision. | 64 | |
| 1921 | United Kingdom | HMS K5 – A K-class submarine, lost with all crew (57) on 20 January when it sank en route to a mock battle in the Bay of Biscay. | 57 | |
| 1921 | United States | USS Conestoga – The ship was missing and lost with all crew after it left 25 March from Mare Island, California, heading for Pearl Harbor, Hawaii. The wreck was located in 2009 in the Greater Farallones National Marine Sanctuary. | 56 | |
| 1903 | Canada | Clallam – The ferry sank on 9 January in a storm in the Strait of Juan de Fuca, between British Columbia and Washington, killing 56 people. | 56 | |
| 1999 | Philippines | Asia South Korea – On 22 December the ferry was off Bantayan Island in stormy weather. According to one crew member a large wave swamped the ferry, knocking out the power. Life vests were then distributed and rafts were launched immediately. Other reports state that the ship was off course and struck a reef before sinking. | 56 | |
| 1925 | United States | Mackinac – late in the afternoon of 18 August, the 162 feet (49 m) excursion ship was passing the Newport Naval Station, Rhode Island, when its boiler exploded, killing 55 passengers. It was on a day cruise from Pawtucket, Rhode Island, to Newport Harbor for passengers to visit the city and its beaches. Most injuries and deaths were from burns and smoke or steam inhalation. Some people jumped overboard but none drowned. The ship remained afloat and many boats came to the rescue. More than 600 passengers survived, many uninjured. The ship's Captain was George W. McVey, who had also been captain of Larchmont in 1907 when it sank after a collision less than 20 nautical miles (37 km) away. | 55 | |
| 1988 | Brazil | Bateau Mouche IV - During the 1988 New Year's Eve, the former fishing ship, adapted for tourism, was at Guanabara Bay waiting for the New Year's fireworks of Copacabana, Rio de Janeiro, when it was hit by strong waves. The movements of passengers and loads caused the ship to capsize, 55 of the 142 passengers lost their lives in the sinking, including the actress Yara Amaral and her mother. | 55 | |
| 1993 | Poland | Jan Heweliusz – a Polish Roll-on/roll-off ferry during the early hours of 14 January, while sailing from Swinoujscie to Ystad, capsized and sank in 27 metres (89 ft) of water off Cape Arcona on the coast of Rügen in the Baltic Sea. 55 people aboard were killed; 20 crew and 35 passengers, 9 crew were rescued; 10 bodies were never found. | 55 | |
| 1968 | New Zealand | TEV Wahine – an inter island ferry that foundered in a cyclone on Barrett Reef at the mouth of Wellington Harbour and capsized near Steeple Rock. Of the 610 passengers and 123 crew aboard, 53 were lost. | 53 | |
| 1929 | United States | Milwaukee – On 22 October the train ferry, while carrying 27 railroad cars, sank off Milwaukee in Lake Michigan in a storm. There were no survivors from the 52 men aboard. | 52 | |
| 1989 | United Kingdom | Marchioness – On 20 August the pleasure boat sank after being pushed under by the dredger Bowbelle late at night near Cannon Street Railway Bridge on the Thames River. Of the 131 on board, 51 were killed by the accident. | 51 | |
| 1957 | Pakistan | Minocher Cowasjee – The cargo ship reported in distress in position 25.3°S 68.00°E, east of Madagascar in the Indian Ocean, coming from Tianjin heading to Antwerp. All 51 crew members, mostly Pakistanis and at least one German, were killed. | 51 | |
| 1921 | United Kingdom | Canastota – On 13 June, the cargo steamer left Sydney, Australia, bound for Wellington, New Zealand, and was never heard from again. Cargo from the ship - some of which was charred, suggesting a fire at sea - was washed up on Lord Howe Island. Otherwise, the ship and its crew of 49 men disappeared without trace. | 49 | |
| 1989 | United States | USS Iowa – On 19 April, an open breech explosion occurred in the center gun of turret Number Two aboard Iowa, killing all 47 men in the turret. | 47 | |
| 1935 | United States | Mohawk – On 24 January, eight miles off the coast of New Jersey, the passenger liner suffered a failure of its automatic steering gear, veered off course into the path of Norwegian freighter Talisman, and was rammed on the port side. It sank within one hour. 16 out of 53 passengers and 31 of the crew of 110 were killed, including the captain. | 47 | |
| 1956 | Italy | Andrea Doria – On 25 July, approaching the coast of Nantucket, Massachusetts, bound for New York City, the passenger liner was struck by the eastward-bound Stockholm. 1,660 passengers and crew were rescued and survived, while 46 people died as a consequence of the collision. In what became one of history's most noted maritime disasters, Andrea Doria's loss generated great interest in the media and resulted in many lawsuits. | 46 | |
| 1906 | United States | Dix – On 18 November the ferry sank off Alki Point, Seattle, after a collision, killing more than 45 people. | 45 | |
| 1974 | Soviet Union | Soviet cargo ship "Tixi" sunk with all of its crew during a storm in the Devils' Sea on March 22 en route from Australia to Japan. | 45 | |
| 1902 | New Zealand | Elingamite – The ship, carrying a large consignment of gold, was wrecked off the north coast of New Zealand killing 45 people. The wreck is now favoured by adventurous divers for the drama associated with it, and tales of lost treasure. | 45 | |
| 1980 | United Kingdom | Derbyshire – Lost on 9 September, south of Japan, in Typhoon Orchid. All aboard (42 crew and 2 spouses) died. At 91,655 gross tons it was, and remains, the largest UK ship to have ever been lost at sea. | 44 | |
| 1989 | Soviet Navy | K-278 Komsomolets – On 7 April the Mike-class nuclear submarine sank in the Barents Sea with the loss of 42 of its 67 crew after an onboard fire. | 42 | |
| 1971 | Greece | Heleanna – On 28 August, the ferry caught fire off Torre Canne (Italy), resulting in 25 dead and 16 missing out of 1174 people aboard. | 41 | |
| 1914 | United States | Monroe – On 30 January, while traveling from Norfolk to New York City, the passenger ship was struck by the freighter Nantucket in fog 50 miles (80 km) off the Virginia Capes, causing it to capsize and sink, killing 41 people aboard. | 41 | |
| 1901 | Canada | Islander – On 15 August, while sailing down the narrow Lynn Canal south of Juneau, the ship struck what was reported to be an iceberg that stove a large hole in her forward port quarter. It sank quickly, killing 40 of the 172 people aboard. | 40 | |
| 1911 | United States | Sechelt – The ferry sank on 24 March in Strait of Juan de Fuca in mysterious circumstances, killing 37 people. | 37 | |
| 1941 | United States | Don – The ship was a pleasure craft that was lost in Casco Bay, Maine on 29 June in an apparent explosion near Ragged Island. Everyone aboard was killed. The vessel was reportedly overloaded with passengers and carrying extra cans of gasoline on deck at the time of the loss. | 36 | |
| 1958 | United States | Carl D. Bradley – Sank on Lake Michigan in an 18 November storm with the loss of 33 crew. | 33 | |
| 1963 | United Kingdom | Tritonica – On 20 July the Bermuda-registered ore carrier was on the St Lawrence River en route from Havre-Saint-Pierre to Sorel, Québec, with about 18,300 tons of ilmenite when it collided in dense fog with the British cargo ship Roonagh Head shortly before 03:00 hrs off Petite-Rivière-Saint-François. It sank within eight minutes with all hatches open. Its sinking was so sudden that all navigation crew were trapped in the wheelhouse. 18 bodies were recovered; another 15 remained missing. Its Canadian pilot was also missing. In the fog and night a third ship, the Spanish Conde de Fontamar, struck Tritonica's superstructure. It saved seven survivors. | 33 | |
| 1940 | United States | William B. Davock – On 11 November the cargo ship was caught in a fierce storm on Lake Michigan. It was making her way down the lake with coal for Chicago, and is presumed to have been overwhelmed at the height of the storm by the intense wind and waves, sinking in about 200 feet (61 m) of water 5 miles (8 km) off Little Sable Point between Ludington, Michigan and Pentwater, Michigan. The freighter Anna C. Minch sank nearby in the same storm. | 32–33 | |
| 1998 | United Kingdom | Fantome – The 679-ton windjammer was lost in October in Hurricane Mitch. All 31 crew were lost. | 31 | |
| 1992 | Cyprus | Royal Pacific – It was rammed by the Taiwanese fishing vessel Terfu 51 in the Straits of Malacca, and sank, sending thirty people to their deaths. The deaths are most likely attributed to the crew's choice to abandon ship first. | 30 | |
| 1975 | United States | SS Edmund Fitzgerald – A taconite Great Lakes freighter that sank in a Lake Superior storm on 10 November, with the loss of the entire crew of 29. When launched on 7 June 1958, it was the largest ship on North America's Great Lakes, and it remains the largest to have sunk there. | 29 | SS Edmund Fitzgerald underway, photo by Winston Brown |
| 1978 | West Germany | The MS München was a LASH carrier of the Hapag-Lloyd line that sank with all crew for unknown reasons in a severe storm on 13 December. The most accepted theory is that one or more rogue waves hit München and damaged it, so that it drifted for 33 hours with a list of 50 degrees without electricity or propulsion. | 28 | |
| 1981 | Israel | The Mezada was lost on 3 March; The cargo ship sank in rough seas approximately 100 nautical miles (190 km) southeast of Bermuda. Eleven of 35 crew rescued. | 24 | Mezada Victims |
| 1948 | Malta | Unnamed luzzu – The fishing boat which was overloaded with passengers capsized and sank in the Gozo Channel off Qala, Gozo, Malta, killing 23 of the 27 people aboard. | 23 | |
| 1931 | Estonia | Liro – the steamship underway from UK to Estonia went missing in a heavy storm on the Baltic Sea. All crew and passengers died. | 20 | |

In 1972, the university Seawise University (ex-British liner RMS Queen Elizabeth) caught fire and sank, just a short distance from Kowloon.

== Wartime ==
Disasters with great loss of life can also occur in times of armed conflict. Shown below are some of the known events with major losses.

=== Russo-Japanese War ===
| Year | Country | Description | Deaths | Use | Image |
|---|---|---|---|---|---|
| 1905 | Russia | Battle of Tsushima – the decisive naval battle of the Russo-Japanese War of 1904–1905, in which two-thirds of the Russian fleet was destroyed. 4,380 Russians were killed and 5,917 captured, including two admirals; 1,862 were interned. The battleships Knyaz Suvorov, Imperator Aleksandr III, Borodino and Oslyabya were sunk. | 4,380 | | |
| 1904 | Japan | Hitachi Maru – A Japanese transport ship that was shelled and sunk by the Imperial Russian Navy armored cruiser Gromoboi in the southern Korean Strait between the Japanese mainland and Tsushima in the "Hitachi Maru Incident". | 1,086 | | |
| 1904 | Russia | Petropavlovsk – the Russian battleship was sunk on 31 March after striking two mines near the Port Arthur naval base. A total of 18 officers, including an Imperial vice admiral and 620 men were killed. | 620 | | |
| 1904 | Japan | Hatsuse – A Japanese battleship that hit two mines on 15 May and sunk with the loss of 496 crew in a Russian minefield off Port Arthur. | 496 | | |
| 1904 | Japan | Yoshino – On 14 May, the cruiser sank killing 319 people after a collision. 19 survived. | 319 | | |
| 1904 | Japan | Takasago – a 2nd class protected cruiser of the Imperial Japanese Navy that struck a mine and sank off Port Arthur on 13 December, with the loss of 273 officers and crew. | 273 | | |
| 1904 | Japan | Yashima – A Japanese battleship that hit a mine on 15 May and sunk while being towed with nearly 200 of its crew. | 200 | | |

=== World War I ===
- See List of maritime disasters in World War I

=== Spanish Civil War ===
| Year | Country | Description | Deaths | Use | Image |
|---|---|---|---|---|---|
| 1939 | Spain | Castillo de Olite – On 7 March, near Cartagena Harbor while approaching the docks, it was hit by three 381mm rounds from a coastal battery and sank soon afterwards broken in two. Of the 2,112 men on board, 1,476 died, 342 were wounded and 294 were taken prisoner after being rescued by local fishermen and the lighthouse keeper. | 1,476 | Naval | |
| 1938 | Spain | Baleares – sunk by the Lepanto on 6 March. 765 seamen died. | 765 | Naval | |
| 1936 | Spain | Almirante Ferrándiz – sunk by Canarias on 29 September; 130 killed. | 130 | Naval | |
| 1936 | Spain | Submarine C-5 – disappeared on 31 December near Bilbao; 40 disappeared. | 40 | Naval | |
| 1936 | Spain | Submarine C-3 – sunk by German submarine U-34 (1936) on 12 December; 38 killed. | 38 | Naval | |
| 1936 | Spain | Submarine B-5 – disappeared on 15 April near Málaga; 34 disappeared. | 34 | Naval | |
| 1937 | Germany | Deutschland, misidentified as the Canarias – hit by bombs from Republican aircraft in the Deutschland incident; 31 killed. Not sunk. | 31 | Naval | |

=== World War II ===
- See List of maritime disasters in World War II

There were dozens of maritime disasters during WWII which had a death toll greater than 1,000 people.

=== Second Chinese Civil War ===
| Year | Country | Description | Deaths | Use | Image |
|---|---|---|---|---|---|
| 1948 | China | Xuan Huai – On November 2, 1948, several merchant ships including the Xuan Huai were evacuating the 2nd and 25th Divisions of the 52nd Army from Yingkou. According to Nationalist sources, the ship suddenly caught fire and exploded at 4 a.m. when 90% of the 2nd division were on board. Soldiers on the main deck and upper holds managed to escape, but 2,000 soldiers in the middle and lower holds (mainly dependents, direct units of the 52nd Army, the artillery battalion, the 5th regiment, and a part of the 6th regiment) died in the fire as too many were trying to reach the stairways. An Australian newspaper, citing an official, put the cause of the explosion as likely due to a chain reaction of boiler failure and claimed as many as 6,000 killed. | 2,000-6,000 | Naval | |
| 1948 | China | Kiangya – On December 4, 1948, the passenger steamship, packed beyond its capacity limit of 1,186 with refugees fleeing the People's Liberation Army, blew up and sank in the mouth of the Huangpu River 50 mi (80 km) south of Shanghai. The suspected cause of the explosion was a mine left behind by the Imperial Japanese Navy in World War II. The exact death toll is unknown, however, it is thought that between 2,750 and 3,920 died with 700–1,000 survivors being picked up by other vessels. | 2,750–3,920 | Naval | |
| 1949 | China | Taiping – On 27 January the steamer sank after a collision with another vessel en route to Taiwan resulting in the deaths of more than 1,500 passengers and crew combined. The ship was packed to nearly twice its rated capacity with more than 1,000 refugees fleeing Communism after the Chinese Civil War traveling from Shanghai to Keelung. | 1,500+ | Naval | |

=== Six-Day War ===
| Year | Country | Description | Deaths | Use | Image |
|---|---|---|---|---|---|
| 1967 | United States Navy | USS Liberty – On 8 June, the technical research ship was attacked by Israeli Air Force fighter jets and Israeli Navy motor torpedo boats while in international waters in the Mediterranean. Israel apologized for the attack, saying that the USS Liberty had been attacked in error after being mistaken for an Egyptian ship. The combined air and sea attack killed 34 crew members, wounded 171 crew members and severely damaged the ship which was subsequently scrapped. | 34 | Naval | |

=== Indo-Pakistani War of 1971 ===
| Year | Country | Description | Deaths | Use | Image |
|---|---|---|---|---|---|
| 1971 | Pakistan Navy | PNS Ghazi – On 3 December the submarine was destroyed by Indian Navy, killing 92 Pakistan navy personnel. | 92 | Naval | |
| 1971 | Pakistan Navy | PNS Muhafiz, PNS Khaibar, PNS Shah Jahan – On 4 and 5 December, Pakistani minesweeper PNS Muhafiz, destroyer PNS Khaibar, transport MV Venus Challenger and destroyer PNS Shah Jahan were destroyed by three Indian Vidyut class missile boats, INS Nipat (K86), INS Nirghat (K89) and INS Veer (K82) escorted by two anti-submarine Arnala class corvettes, INS Kiltan (P79) and INS Katchall (P81) in Operation Trident killing more than 300 Pakistani sailors. | 300+ | Naval | |
| 1971 | Indian Navy | INS Khukri – On 9 December the Indian frigate was torpedoed and sunk by the Pakistani submarine PNS Hangor (S131), killing 194 people. This was the first sinking by a submarine since World War II. | 194 | Naval | |

=== Falklands War ===
| Year | Country | Description | Deaths | Use | Image |
|---|---|---|---|---|---|
| 1982 | Argentina | ARA General Belgrano – On 2 May the Argentinian light cruiser was torpedoed and sunk by British submarine HMS Conqueror, killing 323 people. This was the first time a warship had been sunk by a nuclear-powered submarine. | 323 | Naval | |
| 1982 | United Kingdom | HMS Sheffield - Struck and badly damaged by an Exocet air-launched anti-ship missile from an Argentine Super Étendard aircraft on 4 May and foundered while being towed on 10 May. | 20 | Naval | |
| 1982 | United Kingdom | HMS Coventry - Sunk by Argentine Air Force A-4 Skyhawks on 25 May. | 19 | Naval | |
| 1982 | United Kingdom | RFA Sir Galahad - Struck by Argentine A-4 Skyhawks on 8 June. On 21 June, the hulk was towed out to sea by the tug Typhoon and sunk by HMS Onyx using torpedoes. | 48 | Naval | |

=== Iran-Iraq War ===
| Year | Country | Description | Deaths | Use | Image |
|---|---|---|---|---|---|
| 1987 | United States Navy | USS Stark – On 17 May, the frigate was struck by two Exocet missiles from an Iraqi Air Force fighter jet while on patrol in the Persian Gulf during the Tanker War but managed to return to port in Bahrain. Iraq initially claimed that the ship had entered its waters but subsequently apologized for the incident saying that the ship was mistaken for an Iranian oil tanker. Due to geopolitical interests at the time, the then administration of President Ronald Reagan chose to hold Iran responsible. | 37 | Naval | |
| 1983 | Iran | Damaged and partially sunk by an Iraqi missile at Bushehr port | 0 | Ship | SS Raffaello |

=== Vietnam War ===
In 1967, during the Vietnam War, the USS Forrestal was floating on the water not too far from the Vietnamese coast. A Zuni rocket from one aircraft flew into the fuel tank of another aircraft, starting a big fire. Within minutes, the fire became bigger and damaged other planes. More than a hundred men and women lost their lives. This was known as the 1967 USS Forrestal fire.

== See also ==
- List of maritime disasters
- List of maritime disasters in the 18th century
- List of maritime disasters in the 19th century
- List of maritime disasters in World War I
- List of maritime disasters in World War II
- List of maritime disasters in the 21st century
- Shipwreck
- Lists of shipwrecks
- List of disasters
- List of accidents and disasters by death toll
- List by death toll of ships sunk by submarines
- List of RORO vessel accidents
