= MV Don Claudio =

History

Japan
- Name: Okinoshima Maru
- Owner: Kansai Kiken KK Co., Ltd.
- Port of registry: Osaka
- Ordered: August 7th, 1965
- Builder: Sanosayu Co., Ltd.
- Launched: November 2, 1965
- Completed: February 1, 1966
- Out of service: 1976
- Fate: Sold to Negros Navigation

Philippines
- Name: Don Claudio
- Owner: Negros Navigation
- Port of registry: Iloilo City
- Route: Manila – Iloilo
- Acquired: 1976
- Maiden voyage: December 17, 1976
- Out of service: 2003
- Identification: IMO number: 6603373
- Fate: Scrapped in 2003
- Notes: Rescued the Passengers from MV Doña Paz Incident

General characteristics
- Type: Passenger ferry
- Tonnage: 2,916 GRT; 2,155 DWT
- Length: 92.6 m (303 ft 10 in) LOA; 86 m (282 ft 2 in) LBP
- Beam: 14.4 m (47 ft 3 in)
- Draft: 5.4 m (17 ft 9 in)
- Depth: 6.1 m (20 ft 0 in)
- Installed power: 1 × MAN B&W 7-42VT2BF-90 2-stroke crosshead diesel engine; 3,950 bhp (2,950 kW)
- Propulsion: Single screw
- Speed: 18.4 kn (34 km/h; 21 mph)
- Capacity: 895 passengers
- Crew: 45

MV Don Claudio was a Filipino passenger ferry built by Sanosayu Dock Co., Ltd. in Japan and launched in 1965 under ownership of Kansai Kiken KK. It was purchased by Negros Navigation in 1976 and renamed Don Claudio. It is recognized for being one of the vessels whose crew witnessed, and helped in rescuing survivors from, the MV Doña Paz disaster in December 1987.

== Service history ==
The ship was originally built by Sanosayu Shipbuilding Co., as the Okinoshima Maru (Japanese: 沖之島丸) in Japan as a replacement for the Kuroshio Maru of Kansai Kiken KK Co., It was launched in 1965 in Osaka and completed in 1966, being 92 m (301 ft 10 in) long with a 14 m (45 ft 11 in) beam, the cruiser ferry was fully air-conditioned and equipped with two cargo booms on its bow and stern, powered by a single Mitsui-B&W engine that allowed it to sail at an average of 18 knots (33 km/h; 21 mph) Okinoshima Maru sailed on the Japanese island route for ten years before being purchased second-hand in 1976 by Negros Navigation in the Philippines.

The ferry was then refurbished internally with its passenger capacity now able to accommodate around 895 people, later rising to accommodate 963 passengers. Its hull was painted in white with a red streak across running across it and its funnel being the same color with the Negros Navigation logo on the middle, the ship was inaugurated in December 1976 and sailed on the Manila - Iloilo City route along with Doña Florentina, Don Julio and Don Juan of the same company.

On December 20, 1987, during a regular inter-island voyage the captain and officers of Don Claudio witnessed a large explosion that caused a ball of fire that lit up the sky, later being revealed to be caused by the collision of MT Vector and MV Doña Paz. Don Claudio reached the site of the explosion within an hour to find debris all around the area but no ships to be found, using a net they were able to rescue 24 passengers from MV Doña Paz and 2 crew members from MT Vector.

Don Claudio serviced the Manila - Iloilo City route until the 1990s when it was put in service for Roxas City as Negros Navigation acquired more vessels, its route changed once again with the addition of smaller ports in northern Panay, changing again to feature Dumaguit and then Estancia and San Carlos City to compete with the MV Our Lady of Naju from WG&A Phils., Inc. The ship was later transferred to Jensen Shipping Corporation along with MV Don Julio and Santa Ana serving in the Cebu - Bacolod - Iloilo City - Puerto Princesa route at an unknown date. Don Claudio was reported to have been sent to the breakers in 2005, but other sources state it was scrapped in 2003.
