= Joonee Gamboa =

Filipino actor

- Born: Jose Espineli Gamboa Jr. August 7, 1936 (age 90); Manila, Commonwealth of the Philippines
- Occupation: Actor
- Years active: 1970–present
- Parent(s): Jose Gamboa Sr. Soledad Espineli

Joonee Gamboa (born Jose Espineli Gamboa Jr.; August 7, 1936) is a Filipino actor. As veteran actor, he appeared in more than 145 movies and television shows.

== Career ==
Gamboa started off as a stage actor, acting in plays produced by Philippine Educational Theater Association (PETA). He was encouraged by director Lino Brocka to join the movie industry. He was one of the founding members of Theater Workers Guild.

Gamboa won the Best Supporting Actor in the 1977 Metro Manila Film Festival for the movie Burlesk Queen. He did movies such as Enter the Ninja (1981), Bayaning 3rd World (1999) with Ricky Davao and Cris Villanueva, and Feng Shui (2004) starring Kris Aquino. His other film credits include Iskul Bukol: 20 Years After (2008) and Ang Panday (2009) played by Bong Revilla.

Gamboa's TV projects include Ful Haus (2007) with Vic Sotto and Pia Guanio, and Totoy Bato (2009) played by Robin Padilla. He was included in the cast of Philippine TV series' Kahit Konting Pagtingin starring Angeline Quinto, Sam Milby and Paulo Avelino, premiered in ABS-CBN on January 28, 2013.

Aside from appearing in television, films and theatre, Gamboa is also a voice actor. His notable work includes voicing three characters for the television show, Super Electromagnetic Machine Voltes V (then-dubbed in English), namely Professor Sakunji, Professor Hamaguchi and Duke Saki, and as the narrator in the 2009 National Geographic Asia documentary Asia's Titanic, about the sinking of the MV Doña Paz in 1987.

In 2024, Gamboa was cast alongside Bini member Stacey Sevilleja in the music video of the song "Sining" (Art) by Dionela and Jay R.

He is one of the founders and the first artistic director of Barasoain Kalinangan Foundation, Inc. community theater in Malolos, Bulacan, of which he is a resident.

== Filmography ==
=== Television ===
| Year | Title | Role |
|---|---|---|
| 1989 | A Dangerous Life | Juan 'Johnny' Ponce Enrile |
| 1996 | José Rizal: Ang Buhay ng Isang Bayani | Narrator |
| 1997 | Batas Militar | Narrator |
| 1998 | Malacañang | Narrator |
| 1999 | Kirara, Ano ang Kulay ng Pag-ibig? | Don Romano Santillanes |
| 2005 | Sugo | Apo Adlaw |
| 2005 | Daddy Di Do Du | Gener |
| 2007 | Asian Treasures | Don Julian Agoncillo/Sulaiman |
| 2007 | Ful Haus | Pidyong Palisoc |
| 2009 | Carlo J. Caparas' Totoy Bato | Mauro Magtanggol |
| 2009 | Asia's Titanic | Narrator |
| 2010 | Daisy Siete: Bebe and Me | Recurring |
| 2010 | Langit sa Piling Mo | Rodrigo Hilario, Sr. |
| 2011 | Alakdana | Ermitanyo |
| 2011 | Midnight DJ | Barrio Captain Damian |
| 2011 | 100 Days to Heaven | Ricardo "Carding" Torres |
| 2011 | Guns and Roses | Father Fabian |
| 2011 | Ikaw ay Pag-Ibig | Pidyong |
| 2012 | Dahil sa Pag-ibig | Father Benedict Cruz |
| 2012 | Inside Malacañang | Narrator |
| 2012 | Lorenzo's Time | Father William Ramos |
| 2012 | Wansapanataym: I'll Be Home for Christmas | Ruben |
| 2013 | Kahit Konting Pagtingin | Don Arturo Ledesma |
| 2013 | Little Champ | Voice of Rangu |
| 2013 | Got to Believe | Francisco "Isko" Tampipi |
| 2013 | Maalaala Mo Kaya: Healing Prayer | |
| 2015 | Baker King | Master Javier |
| 2018 | Bagani | Koloko |
| 2020 | Love Thy Woman | Zheng Gongsu |
| 2023–2025 | FPJ's Batang Quiapo | Harrison Co Cheng / Angkong |
| 2026 | Sigabo | Papang/Paps/Tatang/Lorenzo |

=== Streaming ===
| Year | Title | Role | Ref |
|---|---|---|---|
| 2022 | Siklo | Amang Pablo | |
| 2022 | Iskandalo | Pio De Dios | |

=== Film ===
| Year | Title | Role | Ref |
|---|---|---|---|
| 1970 | Santiago! | Desto | |
| 1971 | Beast of the Yellow Night | Mateo | |
| 1971 | Stardoom | | |
| 1971 | Lilet | Dr. Antero | |
| 1973 | Wonder Women | Won Ton Charlie | |
| 1974 | T.N.T Jackson | Drug Dealer | |
| 1974 | Tinimbing Ka Ngunit Kulang | Eddie's father | |
| 1975 | Maynila: Sa Mga Kuko ng Liwanag | Omeng | |
| 1975 | Ang Madugong Daigdig ni Salvacion | | |
| 1975 | Cover Girls Models | Chen | |
| 1975 | Ang Madugong Daigdig ni Salvacion | | |
| 1975 | Tag-Ulan sa Tag-Araw | | |
| 1976 | High Velocity | Commander Habagat | |
| 1977 | Burlesk Queen | Louie | |
| 1978 | Patayin si Mediavillo | | |
| 1978 | Pagputi ng Uwak, Pag-itim ng Tagak | Maestro Roque | |
| 1979 | Durugin si Totoy Bato | | |
| 1979 | Pagputi ng Uwak, Pag-itim ng Tagak | Maestro Roque | |
| 1980 | Aguila | | |
| 1981 | Enter the Ninja | Mr. Mesuda | |
| 1981 | San Basilio | | |
| 1982 | Palengke Queen | | |
| 1982 | The Year of Living Dangerously | a naval officer | |
| 1982 | Virgin People | | |
| 1983 | Karnal | Pekto | |
| 1984 | Sa Hirap at Ginhawa | | |
| 1985 | Ma'am May We Go Out | Assistant Principal De Sahagon | |
| 1987 | Ultimatum: Ceasefire! | The warlord | |
| 1987 | G.I. Baby | | |
| 1987 | Saan Nagtatago ang Pag-Ibig | | |
| 1988 | Saigon Commandos | | |
| 1988 | Ambush | | |
| 1989 | Arrest: Pat. Rizal Alih - Zamboanga Massacre | | |
| 1989 | Kahit Wala Ka Na | | |
| 1990 | Kunin Mo ang Ulo ni Ismael | | |
| 1990 | Hukom .45 | narrator | |
| 1990 | Demonstone | | |
| 1990 | Primary Target | | |
| 1991 | Okay Ka, Fairy Ko | | |
| 1993 | Mario Sandoval | Delfin | |
| 1994 | Fortunes of War | | |
| 1995 | Closer to Home | Magno | |
| 1996 | The Chain | | |
| 1999 | Bayaning 3rd World | Paciano | |
| 1999 | Burlesk King | Miong | |
| 1999 | Brokedown Palace | Attorney Montree | |
| 1999 | Pepeng Agimat | | |
| 2000 | Ping Lacson: Super Cop | father of Ping | |
| 2001 | Buhay Kamao | | |
| 2002 | Diskarte | Ka Esteban | |
| 2003 | Lastikman | Lolo Pablo | |
| 2004 | Feng Shui | Hsui Liao | |
| 2005 | La Visa Loca | | |
| 2005 | Ispiritista: Itay, May Moomoo! | Fr. Ben | |
| 2006 | Till I Met You | Mang Pagal | |
| 2008 | Iskul Bukol 20 Years After: The Ungasis and Escaleras Adventure | Peseta Caretaker | |
| 2009 | Ang Panday | Lolo Isko | |
| 2009 | Ang Darling Kong Aswang | | |
| 2011 | Ang Panday 2 | Lolo Isko | |
| 2011 | Pak! Pak! My Dr. Kwak! | Tatay Juan | |
| 2012 | El Presidente | Felipe Buencamino | |
| 2014 | Feng Shui 2 | Hsui Liao | |
| 2016 | Magtanggol | Juan Magtanggol | |
| 2017 | Obando at ang Sayaw ng Pananampalataya (Obando's Dance of Faith) | narrator | |
| 2018 | Oda sa Wala | Mang Rudy | |
| 2020 | Suarez: The Healing Priest | a bishop | |
| 2023 | About Us But Not About Us | | |
| 2023 | Lola Magdalena | Ernesto | |

=== Music videos ===
| Year | Title | Role | Ref |
|---|---|---|---|
| 2024 | Sining | Hospital patient | |

== Theatre ==
| Year | Title | Role | Ref |
|---|---|---|---|
| 1973 | Ang Piging (The Feast) | | |
| 1980 | Canuplin | | |
| unknown | Ang Tatay Mong Kalbo | | |
| unknown | Loot | | |

== Awards and nominations ==
| Year | Award-giving body | Category | Work | Result | Ref |
|---|---|---|---|---|---|
| 1977 | Metro Manila Film Festival | Best Supporting Actor | Burlesk Queen | Won | |
| 1979 | Gawad Urian | Best Supporting Actor | Pagputi ng Uwak, Pag-itim ng Tagak | Won | |
| 1979 | FAMAS Award | Best Supporting Actor | Pagputi ng Uwak, Pag-itim ng Tagak | Nominated | |
| 1981 | Gawad Urian | Best Supporting Actor | Aguila | Nominated | |
| 1994 | FAMAS Award | Best Supporting Actor | Mario Sandoval | Nominated | |
| 2002 | Manila Film Festival | Best Supporting Actor | Diskarte | Won | |
| 2003 | FAP Awards | Best Supporting Actor | Diskarte | Nominated | |
| 2015 | Aliw Awards | Lifetime Achievement Award | his body of works in the theatre | Won | |
| 2016 | Gawad Tanglaw | Natatanging Gawad Tanglaw Sa Sining ng Pelikula | his body of works | Won | |
| 2016 | Singkuwento International Film Festival | Best Actor | Upos | Won | |
| 2019 | Malaysia International Film Festival | Best Supporting Actor | Oda Sa Wala | Nominated | |
| 2019 | Sine Sandaan of the Film Development Council of the Philippines | Living Legends of Philippine Cinema - Character Actor | his body of works | Won | |
