= Sinking of the ferry Neptune =

1993 maritime disaster near Haiti

Coordinates: 18°33′31″N 73°10′45″W

- Approximate location
- Date: February 16, 1993
- Location: Gulf of Gonâve, north of Miragoane, Haiti
- Cause: Conditions of the weather, ship, and crowd
- Outcome: ~1,500 deaths out of ~2,000 passengers

The sinking of the ferry Neptune, a commercial ship which regularly carried people and cargo between the Haitian cities of Jérémie to Port-au-Prince, occurred on the night of February 16, 1993. It capsized and sank in the Gulf of Gonâve off the coast of Miragoane, due to a mix of the passenger crowd's size and movement, and the conditions of the ship and weather. The accident likely caused 1,500 deaths out of 2,000 passengers, which would make it one of the deadliest maritime disasters in history.

Haiti's economic and political situation at the time allowed their ferry system to operate with no regulations, which contributed to the ship's large crowd size. When a heavy rainstorm hit the ship halfway through its journey, the ship started to pitch and roll, and the crowd panicked, going to one side of the ship. This caused the ship to capsize, and it eventually sank. Search-and-rescue efforts were done mostly by the U.S. Coast Guard, though the efforts were less effective than they could have been, as it took two days for the sinking to be officially reported in Port-au-Prince.

== Background ==
Ferries are a common method of transportation in Haiti; this is now mainly motivated by gangs setting up blockades along the country's highways amidst its instability after the 2021 assassination of Jovenel Moïse, but at the time the ferry Neptune sank in 1993, this was due to a general lack of usable roads and vehicles—and for aircraft and buses, fuel. Many of the ferries at the time were in poor conditions, and often caused deaths due to accidents including engine failures. After the 1991 coup in Haiti, an embargo was put against the country, halting it from importing goods like ship fuel and spare parts for ships. Boat companies became "systematically permitted" to ignore government regulations.

The Neptune regularly ran from the county's western port and agricultural production center of Jérémie to the capital of Port-au-Prince, 120 miles (190 km) to 180 miles (290 km) away. It ordinarily carried people and cargo (including cattle) brought on by poorer passengers to be sold in Port-au-Prince. The boat was 150 feet (46 m) or 163 feet (50 m) long, steel-hulled, and had three decks. It was aging, rusting, and poorly maintained. The captain's name has been reported as both "Julio Antoine" and "Benjamin St. Clair". It was owned by Carmin Magliore, who was on the boat when it sank, but survived. It was one of two ships which regularly ran that route, which took 12 to 18 hours. Tickets cost $7 in 1993 U.S. dollars. The Tampa Bay Times described the bay in between the cities as "treacherous". Days before the ferry's sinking, it was witnessed having no lifeboats. Survivors of the sinking said it had no emergency gear, including radios.

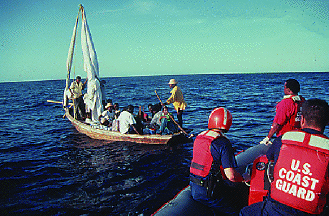
The U.S. Coast Guard's practice of intercepting Haitian refugee ships, pictured here in 1998, led to overcrowding onboard the Neptune.

In Haiti's national economic crisis and political repression following the coup, there was a refugee movement during which some Haitians hijacked ships in order to sail to the United States and seek asylum there. The U.S. Coast Guard (USCG) would attempt to destroy these ships while bringing their occupants back to Haiti. This caused Neptune's regular Tuesday run to be delayed for several weeks in 1993. According to a Haitian official, this led to overcrowding during the ship's fatal journey, due to demand built up over the weeks. In addition, the ship often carried more people than its limit of roughly 650. Local ferries at the time would cram as many people on board at one time to earn more money.

== Sinking ==
On the night of February 16, 1993, the ship was doing its regular run, carrying hundreds of passengers. The number has been reported as between 800 or 850 at its lowest, and 2,000 at its highest. However, 800 is an unlikely, conservative estimate. The number is not exact as the ship carried no passenger lists. 750 or 800 tickets were sold for this particular trip, but after a later ferry had cancelled that day, at least 150 people overwhelmed guards and crammed onto the ship. A survivor said there were at least 100 children on board, and that all of them died.

Part of the Gulf of Gonâve; the sinking happened between Gonâve Island at center-left and the Tiburon Peninsula at lower-right.

According to a USCG representative, halfway through its journey, the ship ran into a heavy rainstorm. The rain and wind (potentially in the form of a squall) caused the boat to pitch and roll. In a panic, many people rushed to one side of the ship, and others rushed to the top deck. Officials, including the captain, said the passengers going to one side caused the ship to start capsizing. A passenger said the captain tried to get people to move to the other side to keep it balanced. The tipping caused people and cargo to spill into the ocean. Some of the people in the water drowned, and some held onto dead animal carcasses, crates of soda, and other objects. Some of them held on for up to 31 hours. On the top deck, there was a crowd crush, which caused the deck to collapse onto the hundreds of people below it. At 1 a.m. ET, the ship finished rolling on its side, and sunk in the Gulf of Gonâve between Gonâve Island to the north and the Tiburon Peninsula to the south, near Miragoane. Survivors said the crew gave no help to the passengers around the final sinking.

== Aftermath ==
Afterwards, the sea surrounding the shipwreck site was littered with bodies and debris. The disaster was not officially reported until the morning of February 18; there was a lack of communications between the area where survivors swam to and Port-au-Prince, as there were bad roads and a "scant" telephone network. This delay led to a less effective rescue effort. The Haitian government offered condolences to the victims' families, and made no further comment. Repairs were done to the other ship that took the Neptune's route.

The commander of USCG operations in the waters around Haiti at the time was Larry Mizell; he said the Coast Guard had been notified of the incident at 7 a.m. on the morning of the 19th, and immediately dispatched one of its planes to search between Gonâve Island and the Tiburon Peninsula.

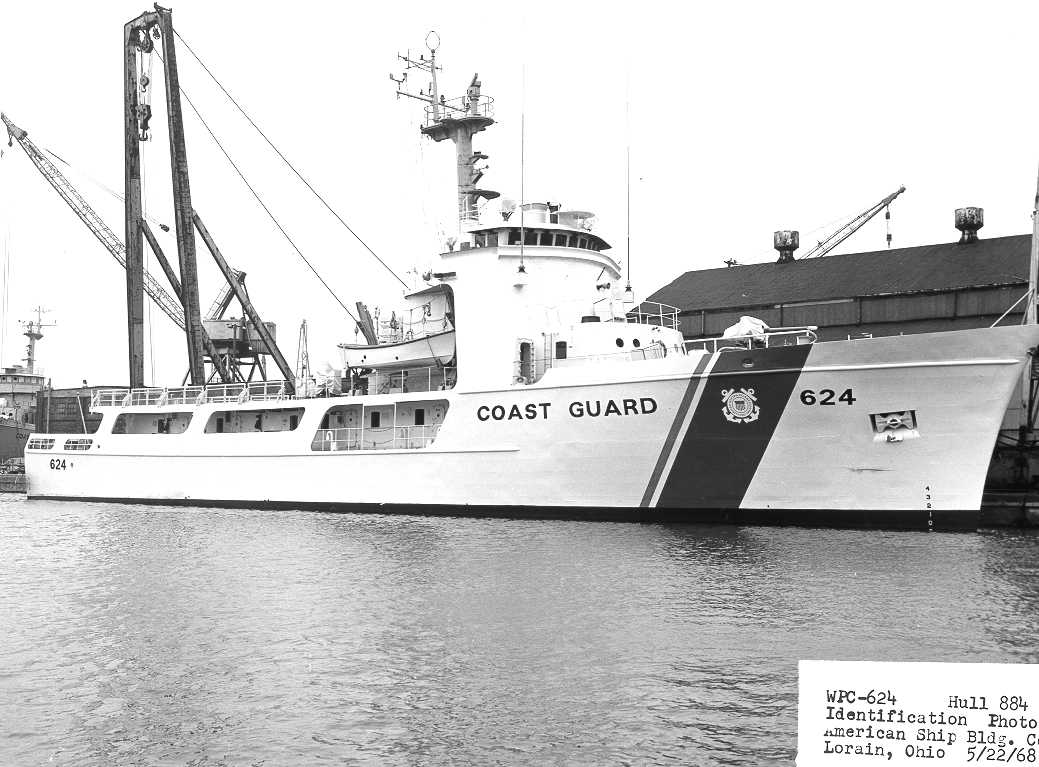
Dauntless, pictured in 1968, was one the U.S. Coast Guard Cutters searching the waters around the sinking for survivors.

The Haitian navy was almost inoperative, and only two small motor boats could assist in the search-and-rescue operation. American C-130 airplanes, helicopters, and two to five USCG cutters (including the Dauntless and Padre) searched the water for survivors and bodies. A USCG spokesman said the cutters picked up so many bodies that they stopped counting how many victims there were. Some bodies were sent to a morgue in Port-au-Prince.

Many passengers, including the captain and Magliore, swam to shore and arrived there by late Wednesday. The captain was brought by police to Port-au-Prince for questioning.

=== Survivor and death tolls ===
There have been different numbers of survivors and deaths reported. Late into 18 February, the head of the Haitian Red Cross said 285 survivors had been found, and said that while further survivors may be found, he expected at least 1,500 to be dead. The USCG also estimated 1,500. The USCG brought 134 bodies of women and children to Port-au-Prince on the 18th. By February 19, around 285 people had swum ashore. They were found in a 30-mile (48 km) stretch which included Miragoane, Petit-Goâve, and Léogâne. On February 20, 170 to 200 bodies were reported recovered, yet 285 was still the survivor toll. The number of people found holding onto objects in the water was later reported as 300.

The Independent estimated the death toll at 1,800, writing that if the actual number was close to it, the sinking would have been the deadliest maritime disaster since the 1987 MV Doña Paz incident in the Philippines. In later years, the minimum number was reported as 500 or 900. Though the maximum 1,500 estimate remains, 700 has also been reported.

== See also ==
- List of maritime disasters in the 20th century
