= RV Petrel =

Research ship

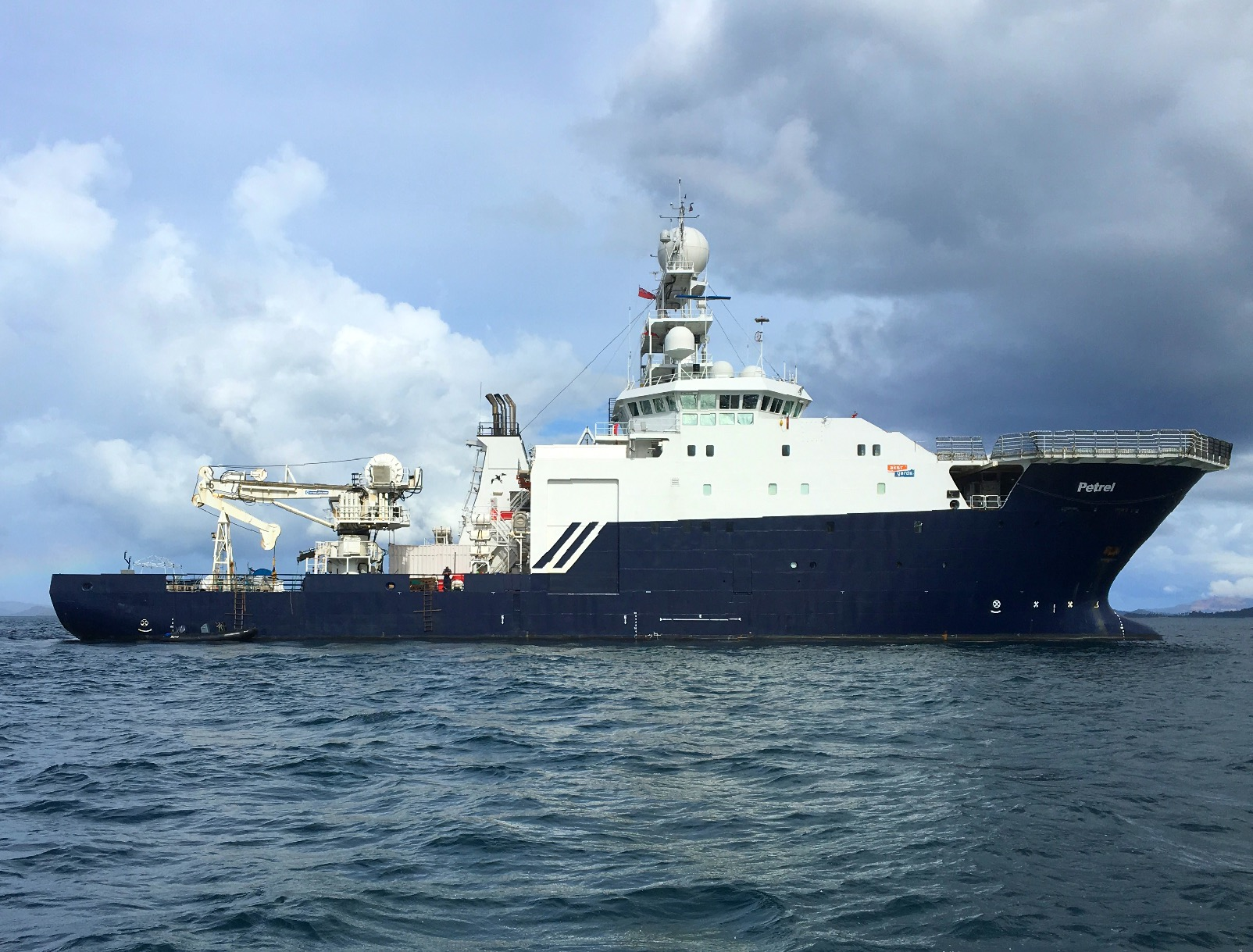
- RV Petrel in December 2017

History
- Name: Sarah Lynn (from 2025); Petrel (2016-2025); Seven Petrel (2013–2016); Acergy Petrel (2007–2013); Seaway Petrel (2003–2007)
- Owner: Naval Facilities Engineering Systems Command
- Operator: Oceaneering International
- Port of registry: Douglas Isle of Man
- Builder: Fincantieri with support of "Brattvaag Skipsverft AS" now VARD by Fincantieri
- Yard number: 101
- Launched: 19 December 2002
- Completed: 23 April 2003
- Acquired: October 2022
- Identification: IMO number: 9268629; MMSI number: 235102789; Callsign: 2HDR6
- Status: Laid up since 9/2020 (as at 4/2021)

General characteristics
- Type: Research vessel
- Tonnage: 3,371 GT
- Length: 76.45 m (250 ft 10 in)
- Beam: 15 m (49 ft 3 in)
- Draft: 7.465 m (24 ft 5.9 in)
- Crew: 20 marine crew and 10 project crew

RV Petrel, or R/V Petrel (IMO: 9268629, MMSI: 235102789), is a 76.45 m (250.8 ft) research vessel sailing under the UK flag and owned by the United States Navy and once owned by Microsoft co-founder Paul Allen. The ship is named after the petrel, a sea bird. The ship was completed by Brattvaag Skipsverft, Norway in 2003 as the deepwater offshore inspection vessel Seaway Petrel for service with Stolt Offshore. She was later renamed Acergy Petrel, then Seven Petrel with Subsea 7.,

In 2016, the ship was purchased by Allen, renamed Petrel and converted for deep-submergence research and archeology. Over two dozen wrecks were explored and recorded between 2017 and 2020, when the ship was laid up. In October 2022, she was purchased by the United States Navy's Naval Facilities Engineering Systems Command, for operation under Oceaneering International management. In 2025, it was renamed MV Sarah Lynn.

== Paul Allen's explorations ==
Prior to 2020, the primary mission of the ship, which was fully funded by Allen's estate, was to explore historically significant wrecks at challenging depths and conditions. A precondition set by Allen was for discovered wrecks to be respected as war graves and their locations kept secret, known to only national governments and museums. In the PBS documentary USS Indianapolis Live from the Deep, Allen said, "We've done a number of these explorations to try to find sunken warships. We try to do these both as really exciting examples of underwater archaeology and as tributes to the brave men [who] went down on these ships". Petrel's other mission profile included hosting scientific projects under Allen's mother company, Vulcan Inc.

Petrel explorations were coordinated with organizations around the world. For United States Navy wrecks, the team collaborated with the Naval History and Heritage Command. In the Philippines, the crew worked with the National Museum and the Battle of Surigao Strait Memorial Council. In 2018, Petrel worked with Australian National Maritime Museum to explore HMAS AE1. Robert Kraft, who served as subsea director for Allen, and Paul Mayer, Petrel's lead researcher, traveled to Japan to hand over ROV video of Imperial Japanese Navy wrecks to the Yamato Museum.

The project crew was aboard Allen's Octopus operating the megayacht's crewed-submersible Pagoo, Argus 3000 remotely operated vehicle (ROV) and Bluefin 12D autonomous underwater vehicle (AUV). The 20 civilian marine crew and 10 project crew worked on 12-hour shifts aboard Petrel. The project crew consisted of Kraft the expedition leader, Mayer as lead researcher, four ROV pilots and technicians, one AUV specialist, one multibeam surveyor, one videographer, and one systems support engineer. For each expedition, local historians, scientists, and observers complemented the project crew.

=== Crew expeditions in 2015 aboard Octopus ===
==== Ironbottom Sound expedition ====
The team, while on board Octopus, mapped 380 sq mi (980 km^{2}) of Ironbottom Sound in January 2015, identified 29 wreck locations, seven wreck debris fields, and several possible plane locations. Of the 29 wrecks located, six were positively identified and confirmed to be the heavy cruisers USS Astoria, Quincy, Vincennes, Northampton, and HMAS Canberra, and the light cruiser Atlanta. Eleven wrecks were "tentatively" identified to be the Japanese destroyers Ayanami, Yūdachi and Fubuki, and the American destroyers USS Walke, USS De Haven, USS Laffey, USS Monssen, USS Barton, USS Cushing, USS Little, and USS Preston. The identification using the sonar imagery with vessel measurements and historical records is pending confirmation by ROV exploration. The remaining 12 wreck locations were not identified during the expedition and require further study.

==== Musashi ====
After several years of searching, the same team discovered the Japanese battleship Musashi in March 2015.

==== HMS Hood bell recovery ====
In August 2015, the team recovered the bell of HMS Hood after obtaining license from the UK Ministry of Defence. The recovery of the bell was performed upon the request of the HMS Hood Association. Only three of HMS Hood's crew survived and it was the wish of one of them to recover ship's bell as a memorial to shipmates. The bell from HMS Hood was unveiled by the Princess Royal on 24 May 2016 to mark the 75th anniversary of the Royal Navy's largest loss of life (1,415 sailors) from a single vessel.

==== Malta wreck mapping ====
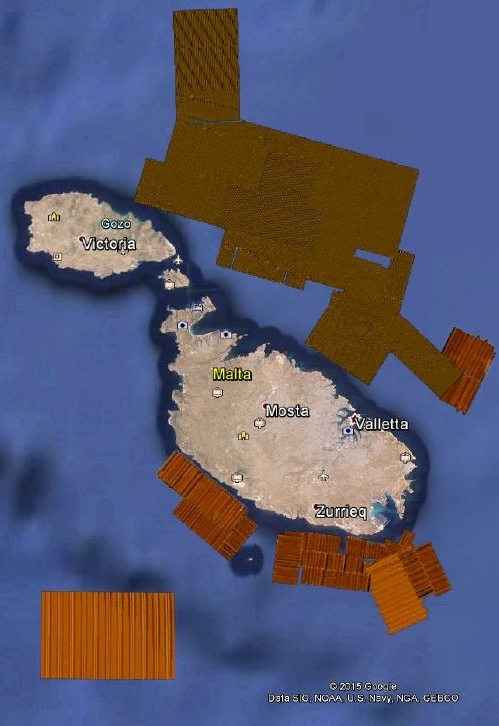
Bluefin 12 AUV mapping of seabed around Malta

While on board Octopus, the project crew deployed a Bluefin 12D AUV and mapped 630 km^{2} (243 sq mi) of seabed around Malta in September 2015. Sonar images of shipwrecks, several aircraft, torpedoes, and debris field were captured by the AUV.

=== Ship details ===
Following the Musashi discovery and the Hood expedition in 2015, Allen bought Petrel in 2016, refitting her as a dedicated research and exploration platform.

=== Petrel expeditions in 2017 ===
==== Artigliere ====
Petrel found the Italian Regia Marina World War II destroyer Artigliere in March 2017.

==== USS Indianapolis ====
Petrel found USS Indianapolis in August 2017. Indianapolis was located on 19 August 2017 at a depth of 5,500 m (18,000 ft) in the Philippine Sea. The discovery introduced Petrel as Paul Allen's newest addition to his expedition fleet. Kraft said of the elusive Indianapolis, "We did 18 search grids, each one is about a 120 square kilometers and that took us the course of a couple of months. It was about 26 days of searching".

The Indianapolis wreck is upright with her hull and armaments intact and well preserved in the depth. Her bow number 35 was seen by the ROV. Rusticles or oxidized wrought iron were found emerging from one of the main guns of the ship by the crew.

==== Surigao Strait ====
After discovering USS Indianapolis, Petrel sailed to Surigao City in October 2017 to participate in the 73rd commemoration of the Battle of Surigao Strait. In November 2017, after gaining approval from the Philippines' National Museum, Petrel surveyed Surigao Strait and discovered the wrecks of the Japanese battleships Yamashiro, Fusō, and the destroyers Michishio, Yamagumo, and Asagumo. Each one was investigated by the ship's ROV and an onboard local historian confirmed the identity of the wreck.

==== Ormoc Bay and USS Ward ====
In December 2017, Petrel explored Ormoc Bay and discovered the wrecks of the American destroyers USS Ward, USS Cooper, the Japanese destroyer Shimakaze, and what is believed to be two Yūgumo-class destroyers. The discovery of the wreck of USS Ward was a central theme for the 76th commemoration of the Attack on Pearl Harbor on 7 December.

=== Petrel expeditions in 2018 ===
==== Return to Ormoc Bay ====
In early January 2018, Petrel returned to Ormoc Bay and dived one of the Yūgumo-class destroyers found in 2017. Based on the 127 mm (5 in) guns and armament configuration, she was identified to be Hamanami. The identification also validated the final resting places of the other ships of the lost Japanese convoy TA-4: the destroyers Shimakaze, Wakatsuki and Naganami. The convoy was attacked by aircraft from Task Force 38 in the Battle of Ormoc Bay. Petrel and Octopus also dove their crewed submersible Pagoo on USS Cooper.

==== C-2A Greyhound in the Philippine Sea ====
In February 2018, Petrel, with a US Navy team aboard, located and mapped the wreckage of a Grumman C-2 Greyhound aircraft that crashed into the Philippine Sea en route to USS Ronald Reagan on 22 November 2017.

==== USS Lexington in the Coral Sea ====
On 4 March 2018, Petrel explored the Coral Sea and discovered the wreck of the aircraft carrier USS Lexington, which sank during the Battle of the Coral Sea.

==== USS Juneau ====
On 17 March 2018, Petrel located the wreck of the antiaircraft light cruiser USS Juneau. Juneau was sunk by the Japanese submarine I-26 in the aftermath of the first Naval Battle of Guadalcanal, sinking with the loss of 687 men, which included the five Sullivan brothers.

==== USS Helena ====
On 11 April 2018, Petrel located the wreck of the light cruiser USS Helena. Helena was sunk during the Battle of Kula Gulf in 1943 by three torpedoes fired from a Japanese destroyer with a loss of 168 of her crew.

==== HMAS AE1 ====
The Royal Australian Navy's submarine HMAS AE1, which was lost at sea with all hands on 14 September 1914, and only discovered in December 2017 on the seafloor off the Duke of York Islands in Papua New Guinea (PNG), was visited by Petrel's ROV. Petrel's crew devised a close-up camera to view details inside the torpedo tube and engine telegraph. This exploration published on 23 April 2018, was supervised by Find AE1 Ltd in partnership with the Australian National Maritime Museum, the Royal Australian Navy, Curtin University, the Western Australian Museum, and the Submarine Institute of Australia. The approval for the survey was granted by Papua New Guinea National Museum and Art Gallery.

=== Petrel expeditions in 2019 ===
==== Niizuki ====
Petrel found the wreck of the Japanese destroyer Niizuki upright in 745 m (2,444 ft) of water in January 2019. While the wreck was heavily damaged, her mast is still attached and complete. The find of Niizuki was noteworthy because she was credited for sinking USS Strong with the longest torpedo shot ever, with estimates ranging from 7 to 11 nautical miles (13 to 20 km; 8.1 to 12.7 mi). Niizuki's discovery is also noteworthy as the photos of the wreck are the first photos of the ship to exist; no photos of her in service are known to have been taken.

==== Jintsū ====
In February 2019, the Japanese cruiser Jintsū's wreckage was discovered by Petrel near the mouth of Kula Gulf in the Solomon Islands. The broken cruiser rests in 900 m (3,000 ft) of water. Her bow section is lying on its port side and the stern section is upright.

==== Hiei ====
On 6 February 2019, the discovery of the Japanese battleship Hiei was announced, the first Japanese battleship sunk in World War II. According to Petrel, Hiei now lies upside down in 900 m (3,000 ft) of water northwest of Savo Island in the Solomon Islands. Hiei is the fourth Japanese battleship found by Petrel's crew. The Japanese battleship Musashi was found in March 2015, and the Fusō-class battleships Fusō and Yamashiro were found in November 2017. Petrel was also able to survey another Kongō-class battlecruiser, Kirishima, in a separate mission. Lead researcher Paul Mayer said that Hiei lies 4 nautical miles (7.4 km; 4.6 mi) away from Kirishima.

==== USS Hornet ====
On 12 February 2019, the crew announced they had located the wreck of the aircraft carrier USS Hornet at a depth of more than 17,700 ft (5,400 m) off the Solomon Islands. She is in remarkably good condition. She sits right-side up with her island still in place. A portion of her flight deck has collapsed due to the fire that raged on her decks during the battle. A portion of her stern is torn away, but the hull remains mostly intact. Several aircraft are scattered among the wreck.

==== USS Strong ====
On 26 February 2019, the crew announced they had located the wreck of the destroyer USS Strong, resting at a depth of 1,000 ft (300 m). She rests in pieces, the largest of which is the heavily damaged forward section of the ship lying on its port side. The rest of the ship was largely fragmented by the detonation of her depth charges and lies in a compact debris field that includes the ship's boilers, propellers, and wheelhouse.

==== USS Wasp ====
On 13 March 2019, the crew announced they had located the wreck of the aircraft carrier, USS Wasp resting at a depth of 13,800 feet (4,200 m). The ship sits upright, though appears to have broken in two places, just forward and just aft of the island, apparently on impact with the seabed. The island itself is still in place, though the funnel structure was ripped off during the sinking. Several aircraft were also found in the debris field, including Dauntlesses and Avengers.

==== Furutaka ====
On 4 May 2019, the crew announced they had located the wreck of the Japanese heavy cruiser Furutaka at a depth of 4,600 ft (1,400 m). She lies in two sections, with the bow sitting near the main part of the wreck, which is upright and the bridge is about 2,000 ft (610 m) away.

==== Maya ====
On 1 July 2019, it was announced that the wreck of the Japanese cruiser Maya had been found off the coast of the Philippine island of Palawan. She is mostly intact, with the exception of her forward bow, which broke off and is lying upside down just astern of the rest of the ship. Her bridge and guns are also intact. She lies in 1,850 m (6,070 ft) of water.

==== Mogami ====
On 9 September 2019, it was announced that the wreck of the Japanese cruiser Mogami had been found in the Bohol Sea. She lies mostly intact, with the exception of her bow, which has been blown off, but lying nearby. She sits straight side up at a depth of 1,450 m (4,760 ft).

==== USS St. Lo ====
On 10 October 2019, it was announced that the wreck of the escort carrier, USS St. Lo, the first ship to have been sunk by a kamikaze, had been discovered on 25 May. She lies at a depth of 15,538 feet (4,736 m) on the edge of the Philippine Trench off the coast of Samar. She sits upright relatively intact, with notable battle damage. She is the first escort carrier to have been found.

==== Kaga ====
On 18 October 2019, Petrel announced they had discovered the wreck of the Japanese aircraft carrier Kaga, off the coast of Midway Atoll. She lies right side up, but with heavy battle damage, 5,400 metres (17,700 ft) below the surface. She is the first Japanese aircraft carrier to have been found.

==== Akagi ====
On 20 October 2019, the director of undersea operations Rob Kraft and Naval History and Heritage Command historian Frank Thompson aboard Petrel identified the wreck of the Japanese aircraft carrier Akagi using high-frequency sonar. Located 1,300 miles (2,100 km) north west of Pearl Harbor, Hawaii, Akagi was found at a depth of 18,011 feet (5,490 m). It is reported that the wreck is upright, on her keel, and is largely intact. Due to damage sustained by the ROV during recovery from the preceding survey of Kaga, and a number of other factors, Petrel was unable to conduct a photographic survey of Akagi.

==== Chōkai ====
On 26 October 2019, the search team announced they had discovered, on 5 May earlier in the year, the wreck of the Japanese cruiser Chōkai on the edge of the Philippine Deep. She lies upright with her bow section torn off, 5,173 metres (16,972 ft) deep.

==== USS Johnston ====
On 30 October 2019, it was announced that the wreckage of a destroyer believed to be USS Johnston had been located. She was believed to have been the deepest ever located shipwreck, estimated at 20,406 feet (6,220 m) deep. Her identity was confirmed on 31 March 2021, when the submersible DSV Limiting Factor of Caladan Oceanic surveyed and photographed the deeper main wreck. The visible hull number, 557, confirmed the identity of the ship as Johnston. She sits upright and well-preserved at a depth of 21,180 ft (6,460 m). The record was broken when the wreck of USS Samuel B. Roberts (DE-413) was found the following year, lying at a depth of 22,621 ft (6,895 m).

==== Doña Paz and Vector ====
On 19 December 2019, it was announced that Petrel had located and surveyed the wrecks of the Philippine ferry, MV Doña Paz and the oil tanker MT Vector. Both wrecks were found 2,200 metres (7,200 ft) apart at a depth of 500 metres (1,600 ft) in the Sibuyan Sea. Both wrecks sit right side up and are in good condition.

==== University of Hawaii's lost ROV Luu'kai ====
On 24 December 2019, news came out that Petrel and a team from University of Hawaii School of Ocean and Earth Sciences and Technology (UH-SOEST) located and successfully recovered the latter's lost ROV named Luu'kai north of Oahu at a depth of 4,720 m (15,490 ft). The drone had broken its tether and was lost on the ocean floor on 20 July 2019. To retrieve Luu'kai, the team lowered a lift elevator and Petrel's ROV worked on the recovery procedure. Luu'kai was recovered by the joint team on 29 August 2019.

=== Petrel expeditions in 2020 ===
==== Deep Argo floats in the Atlantic Ocean ====
After finding Kaga and Akagi, Petrel crossed the Pacific in the fourth quarter of 2019 and stationed in the Atlantic Ocean to launch Deep Argo floats beginning January 2020. Through several weeks in January 2020, in the Brazil Basin of the Atlantic, Petrel and National Oceanic and Atmospheric Administration (NOAA) deployed a number of standard Navis floats (2000-m profiles), and deep SOLO floats (6000-m profiles).

As part of the Deep Argo project, a multiyear partnership between the NOAA Pacific Marine Environmental Laboratory (NOAA PMEL) and the Paul G. Allen Family Foundation, the project aimed for a final deployment of Deep Argo floats aboard Petrel. Thousands of these floats are freely drifting around the globe to measure the temperature, salinity, and turbidity of the upper ocean, at depths down to 2,000 m (6,600 ft) and deeper to 6,000 m (20,000 ft). The Foundation committed $4 million to NOAA to help implement the Deep Argo effort.

==== Full ocean multi-beam and sub bottom-profiler ====
In June 2020, Petrel had a Kongsberg EM124 1°x2° full ocean MBES installed. A sub-bottom profiler, a Kongsberg SBP 29 6° system, was also installed on the ship. Both were tested in the Atlantic Ocean, giving detailed bathymetry readings from 400 to 4,800 m (1,300 to 15,700 ft) depths.

=== Long-term moorage ===
On 11 June 2020, the Petrel's Facebook page announced that the vessel was going to be moored indefinitely. The announcement read:

The impact of the COVID-19 crisis has changed the world for the long term in ways that we never could have imagined. As a result of operational challenges from the pandemic, R/V Petrel will be placed into long-term moorage and she will not be deployed for the foreseeable future. We were tasked with a monumental mission — discover, educate, and honor — and we're hopeful we will eventually be back in service". Robert Kraft, subsea director, said, "I am proud of the successful Petrel missions that have brought information and closure to so many families and friends of WWII heroes. I am hopeful that Petrel will eventually be back in service, supporting the collection of ocean data and science".

After a drydocking in Florida, Petrel sailed for Leith, Scotland, on 16 August 2020 and arrived on 3 September to be laid up.

== United States Navy ==
In October 2022, Petrel was purchased by the United States Navy for its Naval Facilities Engineering and Expeditionary Warfare Center (NAVFAC EXWC), to be operated by the American company Oceaneering International. The ship, plus associated spare parts, was purchased for $12,400,000.

On 22 March 2023, whilst dry-docked at Imperial Dock in the Port of Leith, Edinburgh, the vessel became dislodged from her holdings in strong winds and toppled over to an angle of 45 degrees. This resulted in 33 people being injured, with 21 taken to hospital and 12 treated at the scene. Police Scotland were alerted to the incident at 8:35am local time, with Scottish emergency services declaring a major incident shortly thereafter. Several specialist medical and rescue teams mobilised during the operation including HM Coastguard, NHS Lothian medical personnel and two Scottish Air Ambulances. Winds gusting between 38 and 44 miles per hour (61 and 71 km/h) were recorded around the time of the incident.

A few weeks later, Petrel was successfully righted and refloated.

Sometime in 2025, the US Navy rechristened it as MV Sarah Lynn; its exact mission remains unknown.
