= Asia's Titanic =

- Promotional Poster
- Directed by: Yam Laranas
- Starring: Joonee Gamboa; Morris Apura (survivor); Aludia Bacsal (survivor); Salvador Bacsal (survivor); Almario Balanay (survivor); Generoso Batola (survivor); Luthgardo Niedo (survivor); Pedro Sorema (survivor)
- Country of origin: Philippines

Production
- Running time: 46 minutes

Original release
- Network: National Geographic
- Release: August 25, 2009

Asia's Titanic is a 2009 documentary produced by National Geographic Asia. It was directed by Yam Laranas and narrated by Joonee Gamboa. The documentary covers interviews and court case testimony in investigating the MV Doña Paz tragedy, the deadliest peacetime maritime disaster in history.

== Synopsis ==
The documentary features interviews of survivors Salvador and Aludía Bacsal, Pedro Sorema, Generoso Batola, Morris Apura, Almario Balanay, Luthgardo Niedo, as well as archival footage of the court cases from TV and live incident showings on the aftermath of the Doña Paz sinking.

== Release ==
The documentary aired in the Philippines on their own National Geographic channel on August 25, 2009.
