= SS Vidar =

Swedish cargo ship (1873–1875)

History

Sweden
- Name: Vidar
- Owner: Ang Fartyg Co.
- Builder: Earle's Shipbuilding
- Completed: 1873
- Out of service: 20 September 1875
- Fate: wrecked at Terschelling, the Netherland on 20 September 1875

General characteristics
- Type: Steamship
- Length: 60 m (196 ft 10 in)
- Depth: 18 m (59 ft 1 in)

SS Vidar was a 1873-built, 60-metre (196 ft 10 in)-long Swedish steamship. It was owned by shipping company Ang Fartyg and was registered in Gothenburg. On 20 September 1875 the ship was driven ashore and wrecked on Terschelling, the Netherlands. The crew members were rescued.

== Ship details ==
The ship was built in 1873 and was owned by shipping company Ang Fartyg. She was 60 metres (196 ft 10 in) long and had a width of 18 m (59 ft 1 in). She had a compound steam engine and a 20 m (66 ft) iron propeller shaft.

== Fate ==
From 12 September 1875 on voyage from Kronstadt, Russian Empire to Rotterdam with a cargo of breakbulk cargo and living sheep. On 20 September 1875 she was driven ashore near Vlieland, the Netherlands, and was assisted by a tugboat. As the grounding worsened, they started unloading the cargo. Due to the bad condition the crew needed to be rescued. The rescue operations was carried out by the mailship from Terschelling.

As of 22 September 1875, the cargo of 50 barges were unloaded and 25 barges were thrown overboard. Also a part of the rigging was saved. On 23 September the ship was under water and began to sink. The tugboat SS Magnet II returned. The next day the ship was in the sand and not much could be salvaged anymore.

=== Auctions ===
From 27 September 1875 public sales took place at Terschelling of parts of the wreck on 5 October and salvaged rye cargo on 27 September and 6 October. The total revenue of all sales were 9260 Guilder. The sales on 27 September of the damaged rye had a revenue of 420.80 Guilder on 5 October on parts of the ship 2410.65 Guilder and on 6 October of the rye 6428.55 Guilder. The wreck itself was sold for 65 Guilder to shipping commissioner Pieter Teunis Krul.

== 20th-century wreck dives ==
In 1989 the wreck was rediscovered and found near the wreck of Anna Paulowna. She was identified by the Swedish telegraph bell. What was left was a little of the wreck, a compound steam engine and one boiler. Also an iron propeller shaft of 20 m with the iron propeller was still left. Other items remaining of the wreck were completely silted up.
