= Dalstroy explosion =

Soviet boat Explosion

The Soviet steamer Dalstroy (formerly known as the Yagoda) operated in the 1930s and 1940s from the port of Nakhodka to Magadan, delivering cargo and prisoners to Kolyma. On July 24, 1946, during the loading of ammonal in Nakhodka, an explosion occurred due to gross safety violations. The explosion resulted in the death of 105 people, as well as significant property damage and environmental pollution.

== Explosion ==
=== Causes ===
In one of the holds, as a result of careless handling and a serious breach of safety precautions, seven thousand tons of ammonal had started to burn while being loaded onto the Dalstroy. In another hold, because of the increased heat, four hundred tons of TNT exploded completely destroying the port facilities at Cape Astafieva and causing numerous casualties. Some of the ship’s crew, having disembarked shortly before the explosion, were in a protected area and sustained only minor injuries.

After the explosion, the captain of the ship Oryol, which was also loaded with ammonal, ordered that his ship be unloaded immediately. The barge onto which this ammonal was unloaded caught fire during the investigation of the explosion. A day after the fire on the barge a freight car loaded with ammonal and located on rail sidings also caught fire and burned. This saved the surviving crew members, who were exonerated from blame for the explosion.

=== Consequences ===
From the minister of internal affairs, Sergei Kruglov, to Joseph Stalin and Lavrentiy Beria; August 14, 1946:

"As a result of a fire and explosion in the Bay of Nakhodka, the steamship Dalstroy was destroyed with its entire cargo: 917 tons of explosives, 113 tons of sugar, 125 tons of various industrial goods, 600 tons of grain, 392 tons of metal, at a cost of nine million rubles. Fifteen million rubles worth of industrial and food goods were destroyed in the Dalstroy’s warehouses as well as 25 million rubles worth of explosives. As a result of the explosion of the steamer Dalstroy, 105 people were killed or subsequently died of their wounds. This included 22 soldiers, 34 civilians, and 49 prisoners. 196 were wounded and hospitalized, including 55 soldiers, 78 civilians, and 63 prisoners."

The damage to the port was so serious that the bulk of freight traffic, including the transport of prisoners to Kolyma, was moved to the port at Vanino. As a result of the blast there was a "fuel oil rain" that lasted for two hours, during which time nearly two tons of fuel oil, which had been lifted into the sky by the explosion, returned to earth.
