= MT Vector =

Philippine oil tanker that collided in 1987

- CGI recreation of Vector in Asia's Titanic

History

Philippines
- Name: Oil Nic-II
- Owner: Vector Shipping, Inc.
- Port of registry: Manila
- Builder: Navotas Industrial Corp
- Completed: April 19, 1980
- Out of service: December 20, 1987
- Renamed: Vector before December 1987
- Identification: IMO number: 8427632
- Fate: Caught fire and sank after a collision with Doña Paz on December 20, 1987

General characteristics
- Class & type: Oil tanker
- Tonnage: 629 GRT
- Length: 51.7 m (169 ft 7 in)
- Beam: 11.6 m (38 ft 1 in)
- Depth: 3.6 m (11 ft 10 in)
- Installed power: 250 bhp (190 kW)
- Propulsion: Triple screw

Vector was a Philippine oil tanker that collided with the passenger ferry Doña Paz on December 20, 1987, in the Tablas Strait, Philippines, resulting in the deaths of an estimated 4,385 passengers and crew from the two ships. The incident is considered the deadliest peacetime maritime disaster in history.

== Description ==
Vector was a small motor tanker, built in Manila, Philippines in 1980 as Oil Nic-II, with a tonnage of 629 gross register tons (GRT) and a length of 51.7 m (169 ft 7 in). The tanker was designed to transport petroleum products such as gasoline, kerosene, and diesel. Prior to December 1987, the tanker was acquired by Vector Shipping Inc., owned by Don Francisco Soriano, a shipping entrepreneur from Manila.

== Collision with MV Doña Paz ==
On December 19, 1987, at about 8:00 p.m., Vector left Limay, Bataan en route to Masbate with a crew of 13, and loaded with 8,800 barrels of petroleum products shipped by the ship's charterer, Caltex Philippines, now Chevron. The following morning, at about 6:30 a.m., the passenger and cargo ferry Doña Paz left the port of Tacloban headed for Manila with a complement of 59 crew members, including the master and his officers, and passengers totaling 1,493 as indicated in the Coast Guard Clearance, though in fact it is estimated to have been well over 4,000. Doña Paz was a passenger and cargo vessel owned and operated by Sulpicio Lines, plying the route of Manila/Tacloban/Catbalogan/Manila/Catbalogan/Tacloban/Manila.

At about 10:30 p.m. on December 20, 1987, the two vessels collided in the open sea in the vicinity of Dumali Point in Tablas Strait between Marinduque and Oriental Mindoro. As the two vessels collided, Vector's cargo ignited and caused a fire that spilled into the water and rapidly spread to Doña Paz, which sank within hours. Vector also sank shortly afterwards. Two of the 13 crew members aboard Vector (Franklin Bornilio and Reynaldo Taripe) survived but all 58 crew of Doña Paz died. The official death toll for the ferry is 1,565, although reports indicate the vessel was extremely overcrowded and actual deaths included thousands more. Following investigations the death toll of passengers and crew from both ships was estimated to be 4,386, although admitting that only 1,568 were on the manifest (still more than the licensed maximum of 1,518). The 21 (or 25) survivors from the ferry had to swim, as there was no time to launch lifeboats. They were rescued from the burning waters by vessels that responded to distress calls. The two survivors from Vector's crew said that they were sleeping at the time of the incident.

== Judgment ==
Vector Shipping was found liable for the crash, while the chartering company, Caltex, was absolved of responsibility. In a judgement on July 24, 2008, The Supreme Court of the Philippines absolved Caltex Philippines (now Chevron) from any liability in the collision between Doña Paz and Vector. The decision affirmed the Court of Appeals' ruling against Vector Shipping and its owner Francisco Soriano. Vector was ordered to reimburse and indemnify Sulpicio Lines Php 800,000.00. This was the total amount due to the Macasa family whose kin were among the passengers of Doña Paz. The Court ruled that "MT Vector was unseaworthy at the time of the accident and that its negligence was the cause of the collision that led to the sinking of the Sulpicio vessel."

A former captain told investigators that the rudder was defective and that it took two men to steer the wheel. An inquiry also found that members of the crew of Vector were underqualified and that the vessel's licence had expired.

== Wreck ==
The wreck of Vector was found by RV Petrel on December 19, 2019. She lies upright at a depth of 500 meters (1,600 ft). Doña Paz was found lying 2,200 meters (7,200 ft) away in the same state. Both wrecks are in good condition.
