= Doña Paz =

Ship involved in deadliest peacetime maritime disaster

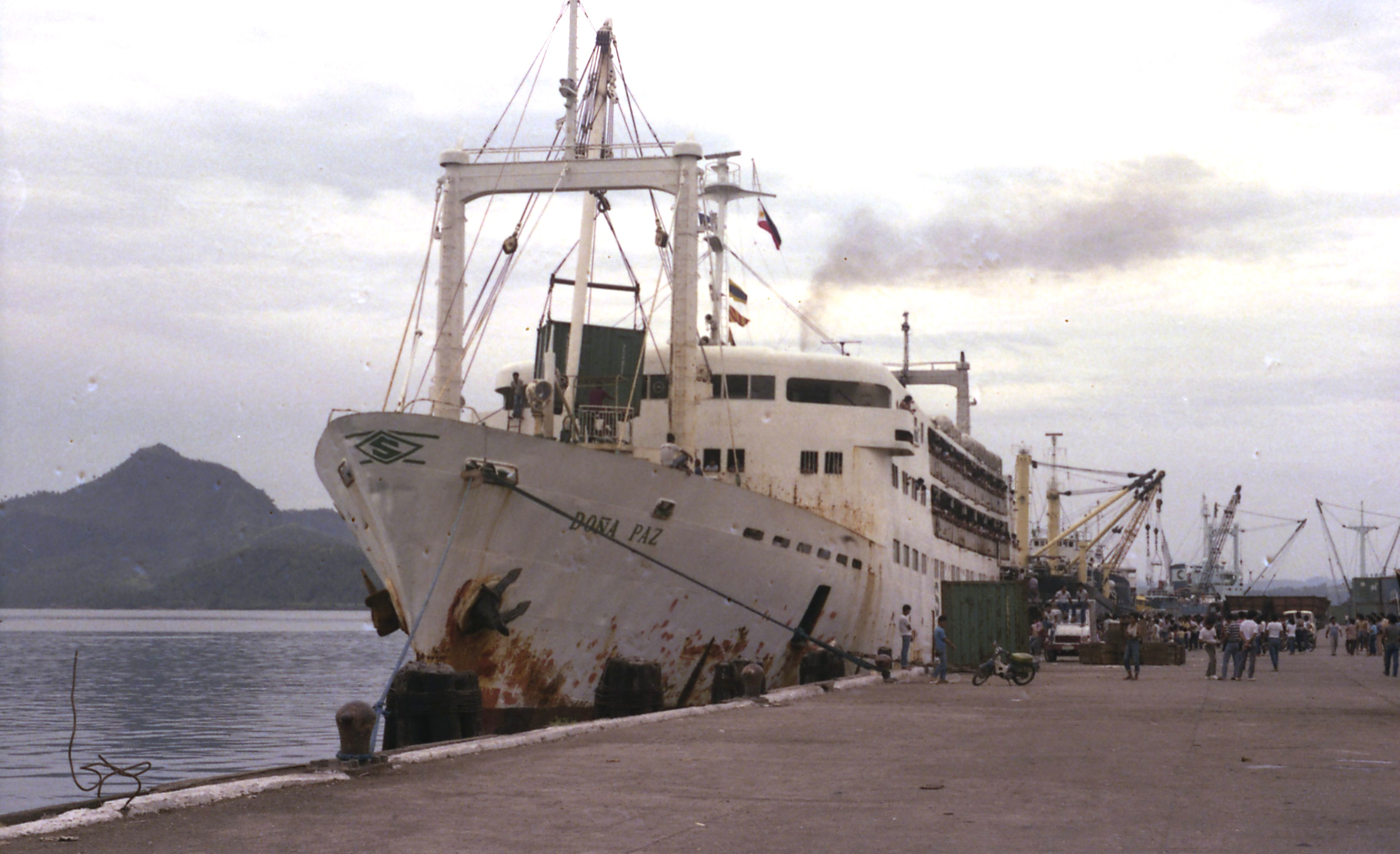
- Doña Paz berthed at Tacloban port in 1984

History

Japan
- Name: Himeyuri Maru
- Owner: RKK Line
- Port of registry: Kagoshima
- Builder: Onomichi Dockyard
- Yard number: 118
- Launched: April 25, 1963
- Out of service: October 1975
- Fate: Sold to Sulpicio Lines

Philippines
- Name: Don Sulpicio
- Owner: Sulpicio Lines
- Port of registry: Manila
- Route: Tacloban – Catbalogan – Manila
- Acquired: October 1975
- Maiden voyage: January 20, 1976
- Out of service: December 20, 1987
- Renamed: Doña Paz in 1981
- Refit: After a fire onboard on June 5, 1979
- Identification: IMO number: 5415822
- Fate: Caught fire and sank after a collision with the MT Vector on December 20, 1987
- Notes: Deadliest peacetime maritime disaster in history

General characteristics
- Type: Passenger ferry
- Tonnage: 2,324 GRT; 1,192 DWT
- Length: 93.1 m (305 ft)
- Beam: 13.6 m (45 ft)
- Depth: 8.05 m (26.4 ft)
- Installed power: 1 × Niigata Iron Works M8T54S 4-stroke diesel engine; 4,500 bhp (3,400 kW)
- Propulsion: 4-bladed single screw
- Speed: Service: 18 kn (33 km/h; 21 mph). Max: 20.2 kn (37 km/h; 23 mph)
- Capacity: 1,518 passengers
- Crew: 66

Doña Paz was a Japanese-built and Philippine-registered passenger ferry that sank after she collided with the oil tanker MT Vector on December 20, 1987. Built by Onomichi Dockyard Co., Ltd. (Onomichi Zosen) of Hiroshima, Japan, the ship was launched on April 25, 1963, as the Himeyuri Maru with a passenger capacity of 608. In October 1975, the Himeyuri Maru was bought by Sulpicio Lines and renamed the Don Sulpicio. After a fire aboard in June 1979, the ship was refurbished and renamed Doña Paz.

Traveling from Leyte island to the Philippine capital Manila, the vessel was severely overcrowded, with at least 2,000 passengers not listed on the manifest. The ship did not have a radio and the life jackets were locked away. However, official blame was directed at the tanker Vector, which collided with the Doña Paz and was found to be unseaworthy and to be operating without a license, a lookout, or a qualified master. With an estimated death toll of 4,363 people and only 26 survivors, it remains the deadliest peacetime maritime disaster in history, surpassing the sinking of the Titanic 75 years earlier.

== Service history ==
Doña Paz was built in 1963 by Onomichi Dockyard of Onomichi, Hiroshima, Japan. It was originally named the Himeyuri Maru (ひめゆり丸). During the time she travelled Japanese waters, she had a passenger capacity of 608. In October 1975, it was sold to Sulpicio Lines, a Filipino operator of a fleet of passenger ferries, and was renamed Don Sulpicio. It served the Manila to Cebu sector as its primary route. The vessel became one of the company's two flagship vessels, the other one being the Doña Ana (later renamed Doña Marilyn).

On June 5, 1979, the vessel was gutted by fire on its usual Manila-Cebu journey. All 1,164 aboard were rescued but the vessel was beached and declared a constructive total loss. The wreck was repurchased from the underwriters by Sulpicio Lines, and repaired. Structural changes were made and it returned to service with the new name Doña Paz.

As the Philippine Princess had already become the flagship of Sulpicio Lines serving the Manila-Cebu sector, the Doña Paz was reassigned to serve the Manila–Tacloban route, with the return voyage having a stop in Catbalogan. Sulpicio Lines operated the Doña Paz on this route, making voyages twice a week, until the time of its sinking.

== 1987 collision with MT Vector ==
On December 20, 1987, at 06:30, Philippine Standard Time, Doña Paz departed from Tacloban, Leyte, for Manila, with a stopover at Catbalogan, Samar. Commanded by Captain Eusebio Nazareno, the vessel was due in Manila at 04:00 the next day. It was reported that it last made radio contact at about 20:00. However, subsequent reports indicated that Doña Paz did not have a radio.

At about 22:30, the ferry was at Dumali Point, along the Tablas Strait, near Marinduque. A survivor later said that the weather at sea that night was clear, but the sea was choppy. At 22:40, while most of the passengers slept, Doña Paz collided with MT Vector, a Philippine-owned oil tanker en route from Bataan to Masbate. Vector was carrying 1.05 million L (8,800 US bbl) or 1,041 tonnes (1,148 short tons) of gasoline and other petroleum products owned by Caltex Philippines.

Upon collision, Vector's cargo ignited and caused a fire on the ship that spread onto Doña Paz. Survivors recalled sensing the crash and an explosion, causing panic on the vessel. One of them, Paquito Osabel, recounted that the flames spread rapidly throughout the ship, and that the sea all around the ship was itself afire.

Another survivor, Philippine Constabulary corporal Luthgardo Niedo, claimed that the lights aboard had gone out minutes after the collision, that there were not any life vests to be found on Doña Paz, and that the crewmen were running around in panic with the other passengers, and none of the crew gave any orders or made any attempt to organize the passengers. It was said later that the life jacket lockers had been locked.

The survivors were forced to jump off the ship and swim among charred bodies in flaming waters around the ship, with some using suitcases as makeshift flotation devices. Doña Paz sank within two hours of the collision. Vector sank within four hours. Both ships sank in about 545 meters (1,788 ft) of water in the Tablas Strait.

=== Rescue ===
Officers and the captain of a passing inter-island ship, MV Don Claudio, witnessed the explosion of the two ships and, after an hour, found the survivors of Doña Paz. The officers of Don Claudio threw a net for the survivors to climb onto. Only 25 survivors were retrieved from the water: 23 of them were passengers from Doña Paz, while the other two were crewmen from Vector's 13-man crew. A four-year-old boy was found drifting in the sea in the immediate days after the collision, but there were conflicting reports on whether he was an actual survivor from the Doña Paz.

The 23rd survivor from Doña Paz, Valeriana Duma, was not originally accounted for by officials. She revealed herself later by the GMA Network program Wish Ko Lang! in 2012. At 14, she was the youngest passenger of Doña Paz to survive.

None of the crew of Doña Paz survived. Most of the survivors sustained burns from jumping into the flaming waters. Doctors and nurses aboard the rescue vessel tended to their injuries. It reportedly took eight hours before Philippine maritime authorities learned of the accident, and another eight hours to initiate search-and-rescue operations.

=== Investigation of the causes of the incident ===
According to the initial investigation performed by the Philippine Coast Guard (PCG), only one apprentice member of the crew of Doña Paz was monitoring the ship's bridge when the accident occurred. Other officers were either drinking beer or watching television in the crew's recreation quarters. The ship's captain was reportedly watching a film on his Betamax machine in his cabin. This theory was given more credibility through statements given by survivor Salvador Bacsal, who spoke of "upbeat music from the recreation quarters", and was corroborated by Luthgardo Niedo, who testified that a fellow constabulary soldier informed him of "an ongoing party with laughter and loud music" on the ship's bridge with the captain as one of the attendees. The Marine Board of Inquiry of the PCG, chaired by Capt. Dario Fajardo, performed a fact-finding mission of the sinking and gave its report to Congress on February 29, 1988.

The Coalition of Samar and Leyte Organizations (CSLO) made an investigative team composed of professionals and police members from the provinces of Leyte and Samar. Their volunteer members intended to gather information on the ship's journey and passengers. Among the documents that they sought were duplicate tickets given to the passengers. CLSO was officially recognized by the Philippine government to be able to provide assistance to the MV Doña Paz's victims' relatives.

Survivors claimed that it was possible that Doña Paz may have carried as many as 4,000 passengers. The signs that they considered were that they saw passengers sleeping along corridors, on the boat decks, and on bunks with three or four people on them.

=== Casualties ===
In the initial announcement made by Sulpicio Lines, the official passenger manifest of Doña Paz recorded 1,493 passengers and 59 crew members aboard. According to Sulpicio Lines, the ferry was able to carry 1,424 passengers. A revised manifest released on December 23, 1987, showed 1,583 passengers and 58 crew members on Doña Paz, with 675 persons boarding the ferry in Tacloban, and 908 coming aboard in Catbalogan. However, an anonymous official of Sulpicio Lines told UPI that, since it was the Christmas season, tickets were usually purchased illegally aboard the ship at a cheaper rate, and those passengers were not listed on the manifest. The same official added that holders of complimentary tickets and non-paying children younger than the age of four were not listed on the manifest.

Of the 21 bodies that had been recovered and identified as passengers on the ship five days after the accident, only one of the fatalities was listed on the official manifest. Of the 26 passengers who survived, only five were listed on the manifest.

On December 28, 1987, Representative Raul Daza of Northern Samar claimed that at least 2,000 passengers aboard Doña Paz were not on the ship's manifest. He based that number on a list of names furnished by relatives and friends of missing people believed aboard the ferry, the names having been compiled by radio and television stations in Tacloban. The names of these 2,000-plus missing passengers were published in pages 29 to 31 of the December 29, 1987, edition of the Philippine Daily Inquirer. At least 79 public school teachers perished in the collision.

During February 1988 the Philippine National Bureau of Investigation stated, on the basis of interviews with relatives, that there were at least 3,099 passengers and 59 crew aboard, giving 3,134 on-board fatalities. During January 1999 a presidential task force report estimated, on the basis of court records and more than 4,100 settlement claims, that there were 4,342 passengers. Subtracting the 26 surviving passengers, and adding 58 crew, gives 4,374 on-board fatalities, almost three times the design load; adding the 11 dead from the crew of Vector, the total becomes 4,385.

=== Reactions and aftermath ===
President Corazon Aquino described the accident as "a national tragedy of harrowing proportions...[the Filipino people's] sadness is all the more painful because the tragedy struck with the approach of Christmas". Pope John Paul II, Japanese Prime Minister Noboru Takeshita and Queen Elizabeth II of the United Kingdom conveyed their official messages of condolence. Given the estimated death toll, Time magazine and others have termed the sinking of Doña Paz "the deadliest peacetime maritime disaster of the 20th century".

Sulpicio Lines announced three days after the accident that Doña Paz was insured for ₱25,000,000 (US$794,602 in 2025 dollars), and it was willing to indemnify the survivors the amount of ₱20,000 (US$683 in 2025 dollars) for each victim. Days later, hundreds of the victims' kin staged a mass rally at Rizal Park, demanding that the ship owners likewise indemnify the families of those not listed on the manifest, as well as to give a full accounting of the missing.

Nonetheless, the Board of Marine Inquiry eventually exculpated Sulpicio Lines of fault in the accident. Subsequent inquiries revealed that Vector was operating without a license, lookout or properly qualified master. During 1999 the Supreme Court of the Philippines ruled that it was the owners of Vector who were liable to indemnify the victims of the collision.

Some of the claims pursued against either Sulpicio Lines or the owners of Vector, such as those filed by the Cañezal family (who lost two members) and the Macasas family (who lost three members) were adjudicated by the Supreme Court, which found that even the families of victims whose names did not appear on the official manifest were entitled to indemnity. Caltex Philippines, which had chartered Vector, was likewise cleared of financial liability.

=== Survivors ===
MV Doña Paz

1. Moris Apura, 37, of Borongan, Eastern Samar
2. Renato Asisturga, 19
3. Aludía Bacsal, 18, of Can-avid, Eastern Samar
4. Salvador Bacsal, 44, of Can-avid, Eastern Samar
5. Almario Balanay, 44, of Borongan, Eastern Samar
6. Generoso Batola, 29, of Borongan, Eastern Samar
7. Jose Cabrieto, 29, of Catbalogan/Calbiga, Western Samar
8. Samuel Carillo, 27
9. Severino Carrion, 25
10. Zosimo de la Rama, 21
11. Dominador Depayo, 23
12. Valeriana Duma, 14 (youngest survivor), of Catubig, Northern Samar
13. Alejandro Estuita, 21
14. Arnel Galang, 18
15. Mario Leganda, 25
16. Armando Lomungue/Lominuque, 28
17. Constancio Mabag, 21
18. Gilbert Mabutol, 15
19. Francisco Minggote
20. Luthgardo Niedo, 26
21. Panfilo Olalia, 34
22. Eugenio Orot, 27
23. Paquito Ozabel, 42
24. Sofronio "Puyok" Sabuco, 44, of Calbiga, Western Samar
25. Pedro Sorema, 17

MT Vector

1. Quartermaster Franklin/Francisco Bornillo, 26
2. Second Mate Reynaldo Tarife, 41

== Memorial ==
A memorial honoring the victims of Doña Paz is at the Pieta Park in Catbalogan. Located adjacent to St. Bartholomew Church and Saint Mary's College of Catbalogan, the park now serves as a public space for families and friends of the victims.

== Wreck ==
The wreck of Doña Paz was located in April 2019 by the RV Petrel, with footage released on December 19. It lies upright at a depth of 500 meters (1,600 ft). The wreck of the Vector was found lying 2,200 meters (7,200 ft) away in the same state. Both wrecks are in good condition.

== In popular culture ==
- National Geographic Asia premiered a documentary about the MV Doña Paz entitled Asia's Titanic on August 25, 2009.
- The GMA Network docudrama series Case Unclosed featured the incident during its Arnold Clavio era.
- In 2018 a horror movie titled Aurora was released, inspired by the events of the tragedy.

== See also ==
- List of maritime disasters involving the Philippine Span Asia Carrier Corporation
- List of maritime disasters in the Philippines
- List of shipwrecks in 1987
