= Tablas Strait =

Philippine strait

- Tabuas Strait
- Location within the Philippines Tablas Strait (Philippines)
- Location: Mimaropa; Western Visayas
- Coordinates: 12°24′54″N 121°43′32″E
- Type: strait
- Etymology: Tablas Island

Tablas Strait (Filipino: Kipot ng Tablas), also Tabuas Strait, is a strait in the Philippines separating Mindoro Island, Tablas Island, Panay and Romblon islands. The approximate depth of the strait is 545 meters (1,788 ft).

The strait is known for being the place where the Sulpicio Lines-owned passenger ferry MV Doña Paz and oil tanker MT Vector sank on December 20, 1987, after colliding with each other, resulting in more than 4,386 deaths. It was the deadliest peacetime maritime disaster in history.
