= List of companies in Zamboanga City =

The following is a list of notable companies based in Zamboanga City. Zamboanga is a highly urbanized city located in Mindanao, Philippines. With a population of more than 807,129, according to the 2015 census, it is the fifth-most populous and third-largest city by land area in the Philippines and also the second most populous in Mindanao after Davao City. It is the commercial and industrial center of the Zamboanga Peninsula Region.

| Name | Sector | Founded | Notes |
|---|---|---|---|
| Al-Amanah Islamic Bank | Banking | 1973 | First and only Islamic bank in the Philippines. |
| Aleson Shipping Lines | Shipping | 1976 | The largest shipping operator in Western Mindanao |
| D' Biel Transportation Company | Transportation | | |
| EMedia Productions | Media | 2013 | Formerly RMN TV Zamboanga and RMN FM Zamboanga. Now running under Alberei Advertising Corporation. |
| Ever Shipping Lines | Transportation | 1975 | They operate routes from Zamboanga City to Bongao, Tawi-Tawi, and Zamboanga City to Olutanga, Zamboanga Sibugay. |
| Galleria Zamboanga, Inc. | Retail | 1976 | |
| Golden Broadcast Professionals | Media | 1992 | Operates a radio station and a television station. An affiliate company of TV5. |
| Mindanao Examiner | Media | 2006 | Independent regional newspaper. |
| Shoppers' Chain of Stores | Retail | 1981 | Operates a chain of department stores and supermarkets. |
| SRN Fast Seacrafts | Transportation | 1997 | Shipping and ferry service |
| ZAMCELCO | Power | 1974 | An electrical power supplier.. |
