= MV Ever Queen Emilia =

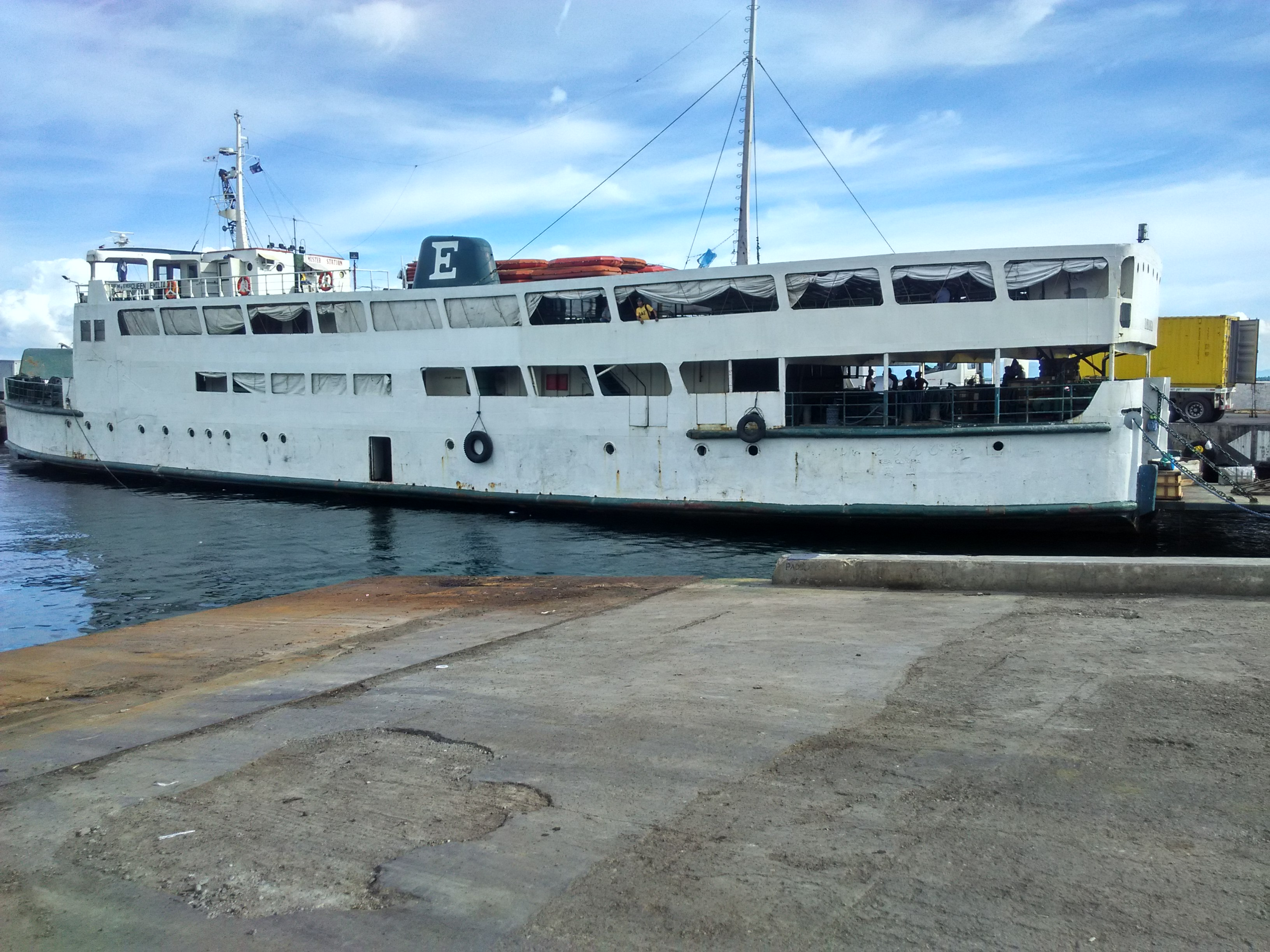
- Ever Queen Emilia at the Zamboanga International Seaport.

History
- Name: Sea Olympia; Ever Queen Emilia
- Owner: Ever Shipping Lines
- Operator: Ever Shipping Lines
- Port of registry: Port of Zamboanga, Philippines
- Route: Zamboanga City - Bongao, Tawi-Tawi
- Builder: Kanasashi Heavy Industries, Shizuoka, Japan
- Completed: 1966
- Identification: Call sign: DUA2156; IMO number: 8944824
- Status: In service
- Notes: Former MV Sea Olympia

General characteristics
- Type: RoRo Ferry
- Tonnage: 248 tons
- Length: 49.97m
- Beam: 13.4m

MV Ever Queen Emilia is a passenger ferry owned and operated by Ever Shipping Lines. The ferry is the former MV Sea Olympia then was sold to Ever.

== Career ==
The ship's career on time with the Ever Shipping Lines was assigned for inter-island routes from Zamboanga City to Tawi-Tawi. However, the ship became an avenue to carry victims of human traffickers and illegal immigrants to Malaysia. In 2013, 130 men were rescued from this ferry along with MV Lady Mary Joy 3.

Although it was notable for bringing victims of human traffickers and illegal immigrants, the ferry were once becoming a rescue ship when ML Katrina V in 2011 was abandoned offshore with 85 passengers due to strong winds and current. MV Queen Emilia was then commissioned by the Philippine Coast Guard to transfer the said 85 passengers and have them in safety.
