= MV Trisha Kerstin 2 =

Roll-on/roll-off ferry

Trisha Kerstin 2
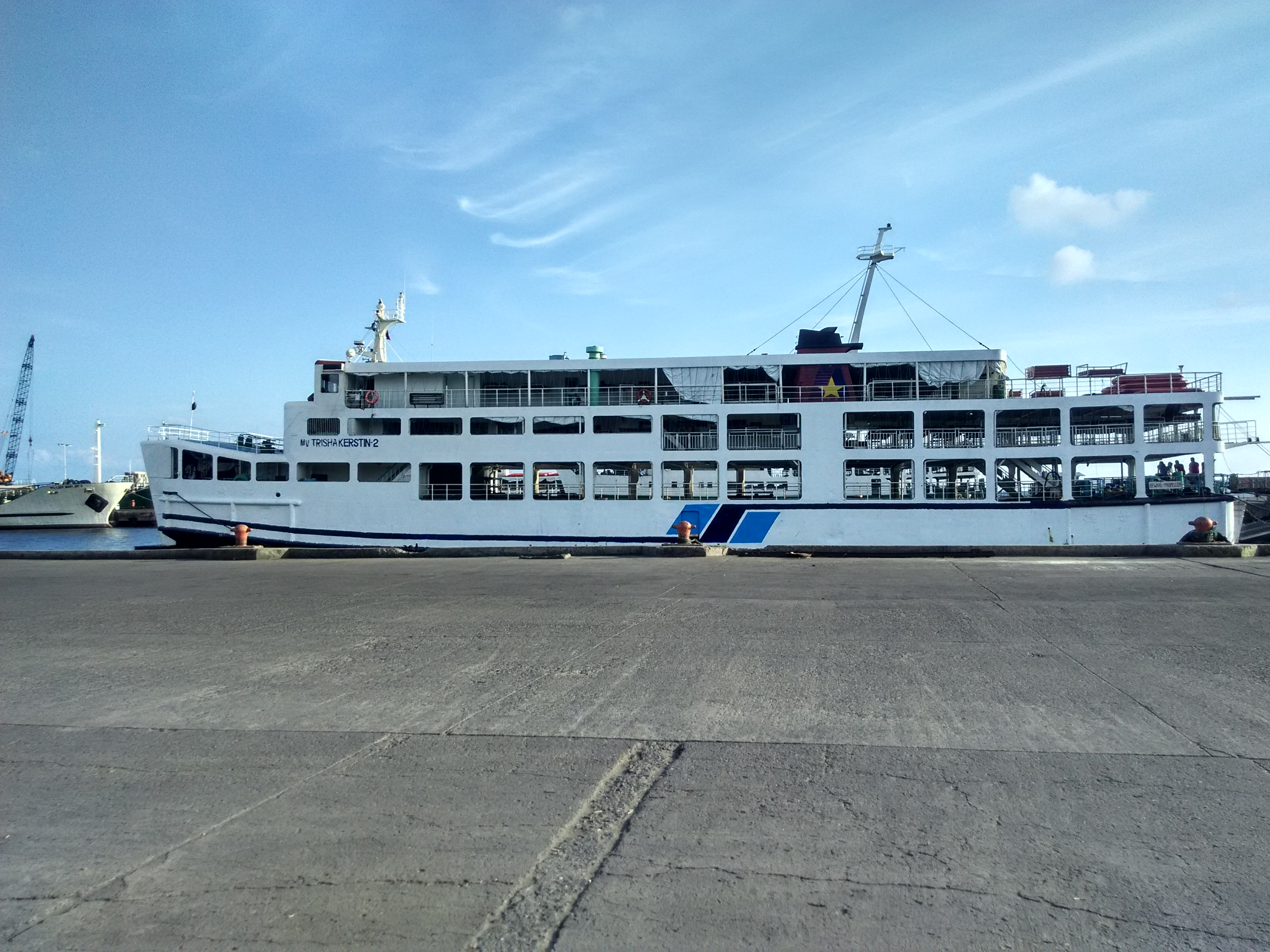
- MV Trisha Kerstin 2 in Zamboanga International Seaport

History
- Name: Trisha Kerstin 2
- Owner: Aleson Shipping Lines
- Operator: Aleson Shipping Lines
- Port of registry: Port of Zamboanga, Philippines
- Route: Zamboanga City - Bongao, Tawi-Tawi
- Builder: Fujiwara Shipbuilding Imabari, Japan
- Completed: 1989
- Acquired: July 2003
- Identification: IMO: 8824373
- Status: In service
- Notes: MV Geiyo up until July 2003

General characteristics
- Type: RoRo Ferry
- Tonnage: 637 gt
- Length: 60 m
- Speed: 15 knots

MV Trisha Kerstin 2 is a roll-on/roll-off ferry vessel owned and operated by Aleson Shipping Lines. She is the former MV Geiyo, acquired by Aleson Shipping in July 2003.

The ferry's name was named by Manuel L. Cuevas, a former auditor and a friend of the owner's of Basilan Lines, Shipping Co. "MV Trisha Kerstin" was taken from the name of Manuel's daughter, "Trish Kristen C. Cuevas".

== See also ==
- MV Trisha Kerstin 3
