= Gothong Lines =

Filipino shipping company based in Cebu City

Carlos A. Gothong Lines Inc.
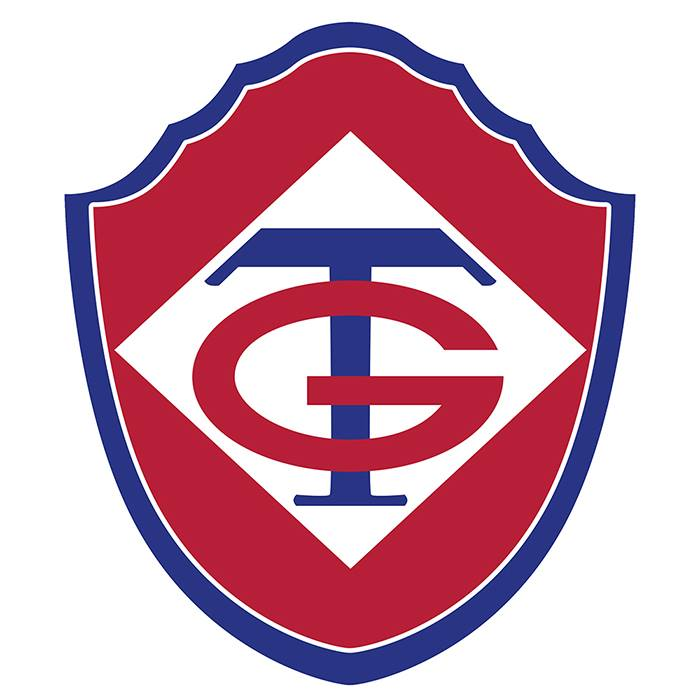
- Industry: Shipping
- Founded: 1946
- Founder: Don Carlos A. Gothong; Don Alfredo Gothong
- Headquarters: Alfredo Gothong Private Wharf FF Cruz, Pier 7, Reclamation Area, Mandaue, Philippines
- Area served: Manila, Batangas, Cebu, Cagayan de Oro, Nasipit
- Key people: Calvin Gothong (President & Chief Operations Officer)
- Services: Container Shipping
- Website: www.gothongshipping.com

Carlos A. Gothong Lines, popularly known as CAGLI and formerly once known simply as Gothong Lines, is a cargo shipping company based in Cebu, Philippines. CAGLI was formerly a part of WG&A (William, Gothong, & Aboitiz), which served 23 major provincial ports throughout the Philippines and was the first domestic shipping company in the country to be certified by the International Safety Management Code standard. CAGLI, William Lines and Aboitiz Shipping formed the biggest merger in the Philippine shipping industry.

== History ==
With a mandate from the patriarch, Don Alfredo D. Gothong, the three siblings Bowen D. Gothong, Ben D. Gothong and Brezilda Gothong Co, lead the rebirth of CAGLI with the launching of its first vessel, Butuan Bay 1, on October 3, 2002.

Positioning the company as a low-cost operator, CAGLI was assisted by the fourth generation of their family, Calvin Gothong, President, who is actively involved in the day-to-day operations of the shipping business and other affiliated businesses.

== Ports of call ==
- Luzon
  - Manila
  - Batangas
- Visayas
  - Cebu
  - Dumaguete
- Mindanao
  - Cagayan de Oro
  - Butuan (Nasipit)

== Fleet ==
=== Current vessels ===
Roll on/Roll off (RORO) cargo
Name	IMO	Built	Entry of service to the Philippines	Tonnage	Length	Breadth	Notes	Image
Panglao Bay 1	IMO number: 9104275	1995	2017	5930	134.66 m (441.8 ft)	22.4 m (73 ft)		
GT Alpha 1	IMO number: 1089534	2024	2025	1477	74.00 m (242.78 ft)	17.00 m (55.77 ft)	A brand new deck cargo ship made in China.	

=== Former vessels ===
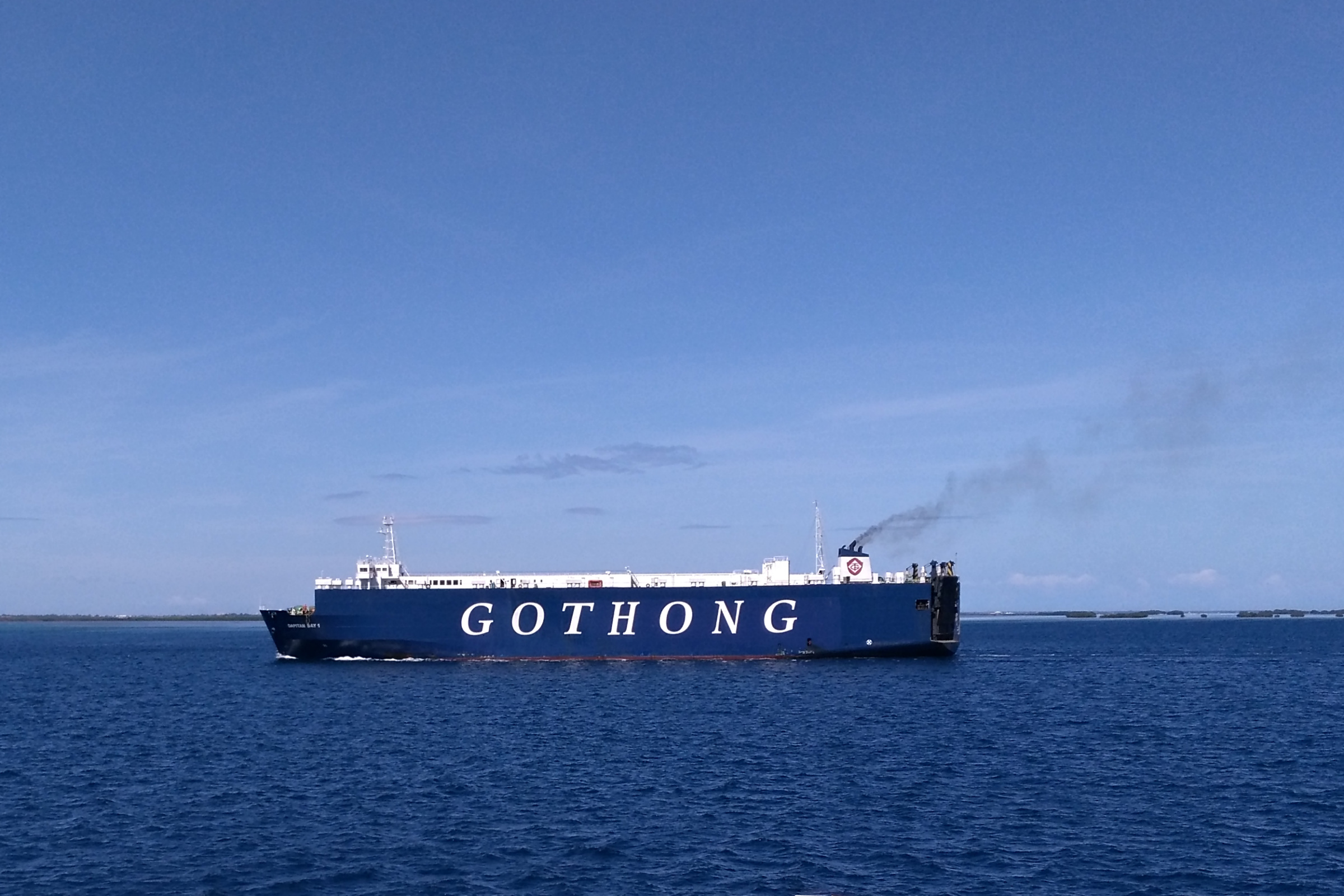
Dapitan Bay 1 of Gothong Lines, Philippines

- Batangas Bay 1
  - Sold and Broken up in Chittagong, Bangladesh in 2022
- Butuan Bay 1
  - Sold to Trans-Asia Shipping Lines and renamed as Trans-Asia 5 until in 2021 when she was sold and broken up at Chittagong, Bangladesh.
- Cagayan Bay 1
  - Sold and broken up at CAGLI Wharf, Cebu City
- Manila Bay 1
  - Sold and broken up
- Ozamis Bay 1
  - Sold and broken up at CAGLI Wharf, Cebu City
- Subic Bay 1
  - Sold and broken up
- Dapitan Bay 1
  - Sold and broken up in Chittagong, Bangladesh in 2024 due to her engine problems.

== Terminals ==
- ADG Terminal Mandaue
- ADG Terminal Cagayan
- ADG Terminal Nasipit

== Gothong Seabus ==
GT Express Uno is a water-based public transport service operated by Carlos A. Gothong Lines Inc., will start operations around April 2026. It connects Mandaue City and Lapu-Lapu City, offering an alternative to road travel and to help reduce traffic congestion. The service includes free shuttle transfers to the GT Ferry Wharf and offers an initial fare of around ₱20. Future expansions, including a possible route to Camotes, are also being explored.

=== Routes ===
- Mandaue City - Lapu-Lapu City
- Mandaue City - Camotes (planned)

=== Current Fleet ===
- GT Express Uno

== Tug boat assistance ==
GT Ferry (GTF), a subsidiary of Carlos A. Gothong Lines Inc. provides ship docking services and towing assistance to all types of commercial vessels and barges in the Philippines.

- Tug 2
- Tug 3
- Tug 4
- Tug 5

== Notable incidents ==
- Manila Bay 1 caught fire in the afternoon of October 21, 2016 but no one was reported injured. Initial investigation revealed that the fire started inside the vessel's engine room. The cargo vessel was supposed to travel to Manila the other night but postponed its voyage due to super typhoon Lawin

== See also ==
- List of shipping companies in the Philippines
- Aleson Shipping Lines
- Ever Shipping Lines
- 2GO
- Cokaliong Shipping Lines
