= MV Ever Queen of Asia =

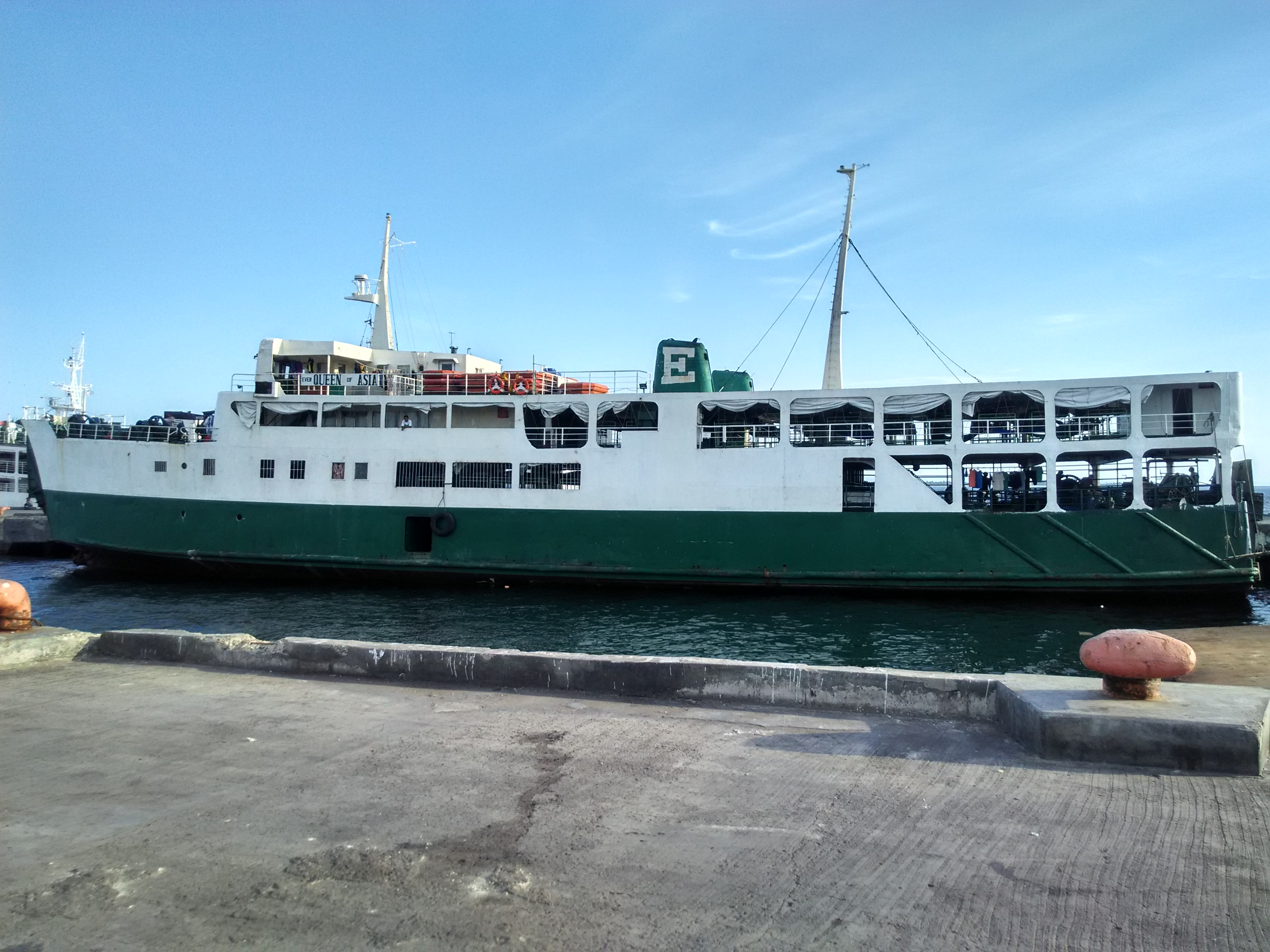
- Ever Queen of Asia at the Zamboanga International Seaport.

History
- Name: Shiraito; Ever Queen of Asia
- Owner: Ever Shipping Lines
- Operator: Ever Shipping Lines
- Port of registry: Port of Zamboanga, Philippines
- Route: Zamboanga City - Bongao, Tawi-Tawi
- Builder: Shimoda Dockyard, Shimoda, Japan
- Completed: 1970
- Acquired: December 1998
- Identification: Call sign: DUJ2138; IMO number: 7034440
- Status: In service
- Notes: Former MV Shiraito up until December 1998

General characteristics
- Type: RoRo Ferry
- Tonnage: 498 tons
- Length: 54m
- Beam: 10m

MV Ever Queen of Asia is a passenger ferry owned and operated by Ever Shipping Lines. She's the former MV Shiraito up until December 1998 when she was sold to Ever.
