= MV Lady Mary Joy 1 =

Lady Mary Joy 1
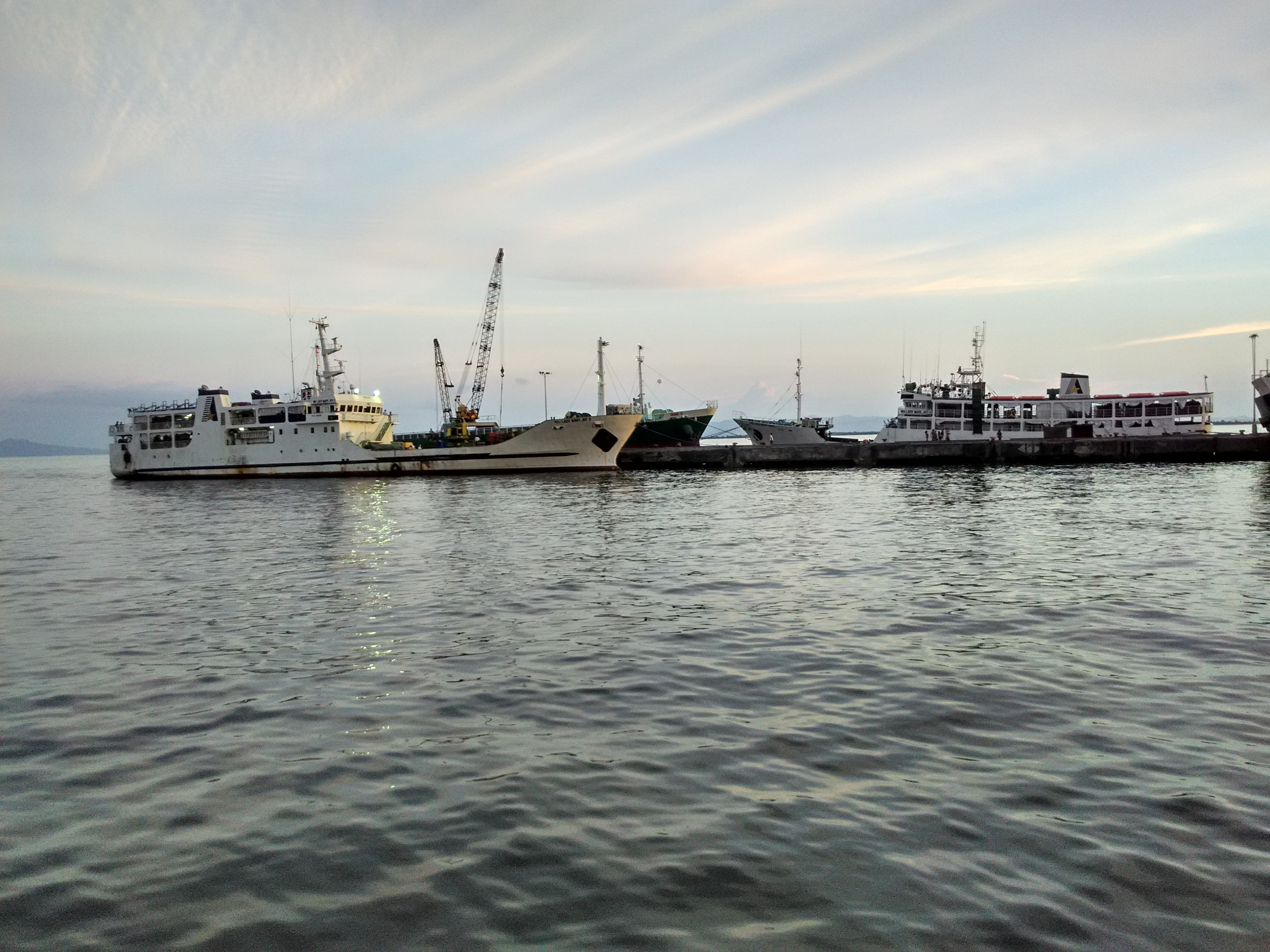
- MV Lady Mary Joy 3 (left) and MV Lady Mary Joy 1 (right) docked at the Zamboanga International Seaport.

History
- Name: Lady Mary Joy 1
- Owner: Aleson Shipping Lines
- Operator: Aleson Shipping Lines
- Port of registry: Port of Zamboanga, Philippines
- Route: Zamboanga City - Bongao, Tawi-Tawi
- Builder: Niigata Shipbuilding & Repair, Niigata, Japan
- Completed: 1994
- Identification: IMO number: 9088081; MMSI number: 457900063; Callsign: JVDW5
- Status: In service
- Notes: Formerly the MV Funakawa Maru

General characteristics
- Type: Passenger Ferry
- Tonnage: 488 gt 717 dwt
- Length: 57m
- Speed: 13.6 kn

MV Lady Mary Joy 1 is a passenger ferry owned and operated by Aleson Shipping Lines. She's the former MV Funakawa Maru acquired by Aleson Shipping.

== Notable Incidents ==
- February 18, 2016 when MV Lady Mary Joy 1 with 308 passengers and 38 crew members grounded off Pampat Point at Bongao island, Philippines. The ship was en route from Zamboanga City to Bongao, but due to human mistake and strong winds grounded in a rocky shallow. The ship hardly stuck and was unable to refloat by own power, requesting assistance from the local authorities. At the scene of the accident were dispatched several rescue boats, which evacuated all the passengers to the shore. According to preliminary information there are no injured people from the crew and guests on board. The authorities started investigation for the root cause of the accident.
