= MV Danica Joy =

Ship built in 1982

Danica Joy
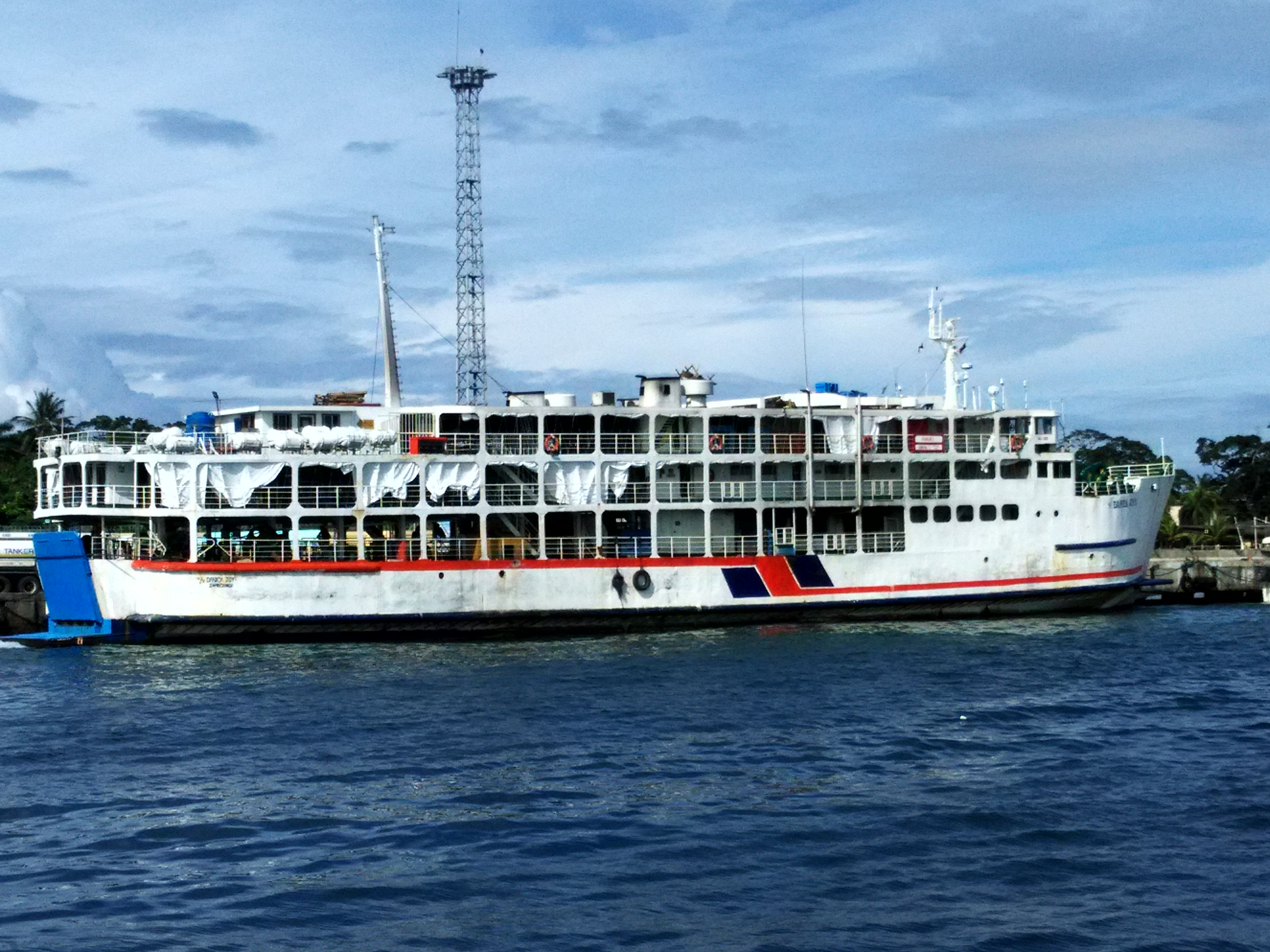
- MV Danica Joy at Zamboanga International Seaport, taken a week before the incident in September 22, 2016

History
- Name: Danica Joy
- Owner: Aleson Shipping Lines
- Operator: Aleson Shipping Lines
- Port of registry: Port of Zamboanga, Philippines
- Route: Zamboanga City - Sandakan, Malaysia
- Builder: Nakamura Shipbuilding Yanai, Japan
- Completed: 1982
- Acquired: 1994
- Out of service: September 22, 2016
- Identification: IMO number: 8135253; MMSI number: 548579000; Callsign: DXYN
- Fate: Capsized at the Zamboanga International Seaport upon unloading passengers.

General characteristics
- Type: Passenger RoRo Ferry
- Tonnage: 998 tons
- Length: 60 m
- Draught: 249 tons
- Capacity: 900 Passengers

MV Danica Joy was a passenger ferry owned and operated by Aleson Shipping Lines. She served the BIMP-EAGA Route of Zamboanga City - Sandakan, Sabah, Malaysia.

== Career ==
MV Danica Joy was a passenger ship of Aleson Shipping Lines that serves the BIMP-EAGA Route of Zamboanga City - Sandakan, Sabah, Malaysia. Originally, her namesake is MV Danica Joy 2 as per records given from Maritime Industry Authority, and through Maritime Connector as she's the successor to MV Danica Joy 1 whose route is from Dapitan - Dumaguete. However, her hull was painted as "MV Danica Joy". Thus, she got the name "MV Danica Joy" and her predecessor was named into "MV Danica Joy 1".

On her maiden voyage to the said route, she was called as the "Hepe De Viaje" (Chavacano term for "Chief of the Cruise") as she spearheaded the Zamboanga City - Sandakan route. In 1998, she was alongside MV Lady Mary Joy 2 in servicing the route up until MV Lady Mary Joy 2's retirement in 2006. Since then, she was the only ferry that servicing the said route.

Other shipping lines tried to compete over Aleson for the said route like Weesam Express, but it did not last long. In 2015, MV Danica Joy was the only ship to serve that route.

== Fate ==
September 22, 2016 when, MV Danica Joy arrived to Zamboanga International Seaport by 4 p.m. coming from Sandakan. After all passengers had already disembarked, the ship listed on its starboard side and capsized by around 9:30 PM, resulting in no casualties.

The Philippine Coast Guard cited cargo mishandling caused the ferry to capsize. Commodore Pablo Gonzales Jr., PCG district commander for Southwestern Mindanao, said initial investigation showed no other safety issue on the Danica Joy. The Coast Guard has called up the management of the MV Danica Joy to shed light on the mishap and pinned the responsibility on the chief mate, being the cargo officer.

The ship's cargo, mostly shopping goods cargo consisting of cooking oil, noodles and other food items capsized along with the ferry.

== See also ==
- List of maritime disasters in the Philippines
