= MV Ciara Joie 5 =

Ciara Joie 5
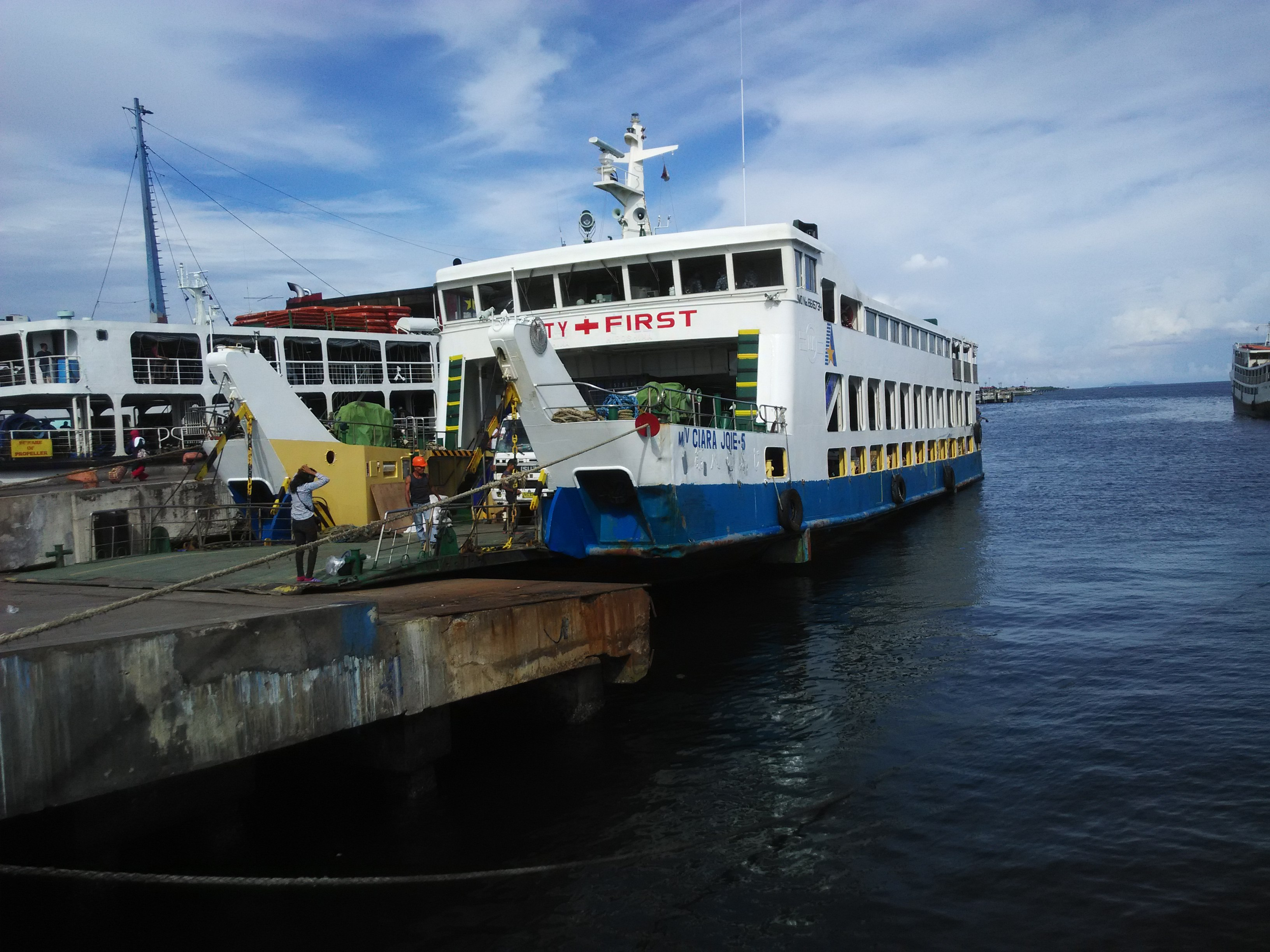
- MV Ciara Joie 5 at Zamboanga International Seaport, ready to leave for Basilan.

History
- Name: Ciara Joie 5
- Owner: Aleson Shipping Lines
- Operator: Aleson Shipping Lines
- Port of registry: Port of Zamboanga, Philippines
- Route: Zamboanga City – Lamitan City, Basilan
- Builder: Imamura Shipbuilding Kure, Japan
- Completed: 1987
- Identification: IMO: 8615734
- Status: In service
- Notes: Formerly the MV Kofuji No.8

General characteristics
- Type: Passenger Ferry
- Tonnage: 264 tons
- Length: 46.36m

MV Ciara Joie 5 is a passenger ferry owned and operated by Aleson Shipping Lines. She's the former MV Kofuji No.8 and currently acquired by Aleson Shipping.
