= MV Stephanie Marie =

Stephanie Marie
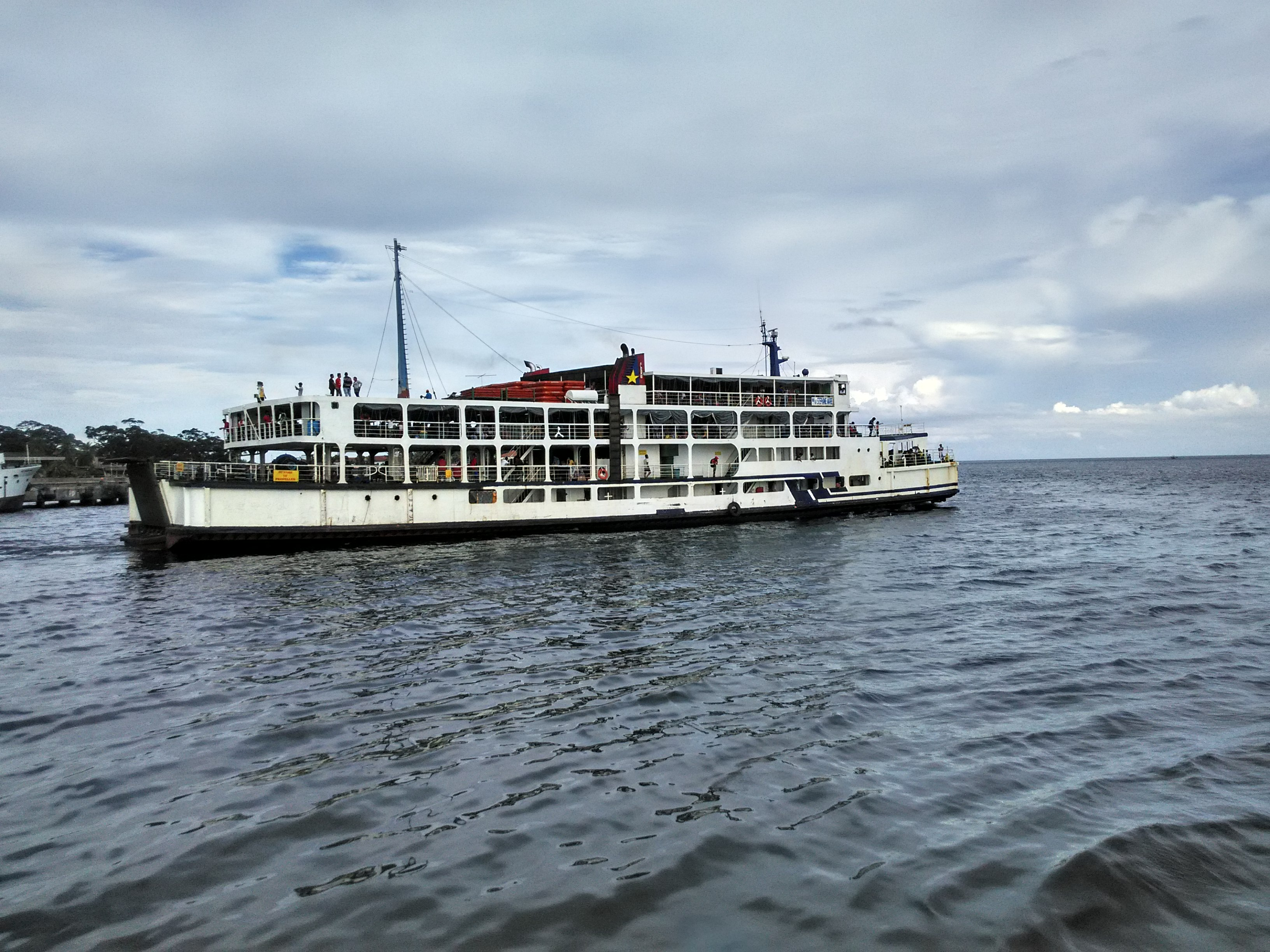
- MV Stephanie Marie at Zamboanga International Seaport, ready to leave for Isabela City, Basilan.

History
- Name: Stephanie Marie
- Owner: Aleson Shipping Lines
- Operator: Aleson Shipping Lines
- Port of registry: Port of Zamboanga, Philippines
- Route: Zamboanga City - Isabela City, Basilan
- Builder: Kanda Shipbuilding Kure, Japan
- Completed: 1979
- Acquired: 1998
- Identification: IMO number: 8427278
- Status: In service
- Notes: MV Marima III up until 1998

General characteristics
- Type: Passenger RoRo Ferry
- Tonnage: 720 tons

MV Stephanie Marie is a passenger ferry owned and operated by Aleson Shipping Lines. She's the former MV Marima III and currently acquired by Aleson Shipping since 1998.

MV Stephanie Marie is also dubbed as MV Stephanie Marie 1 following the acquisition of MV Stephanie Marie 2
