= MV Lady Mary Joy 3 =

Passenger ship built in 1990

Lady Mary Joy 3
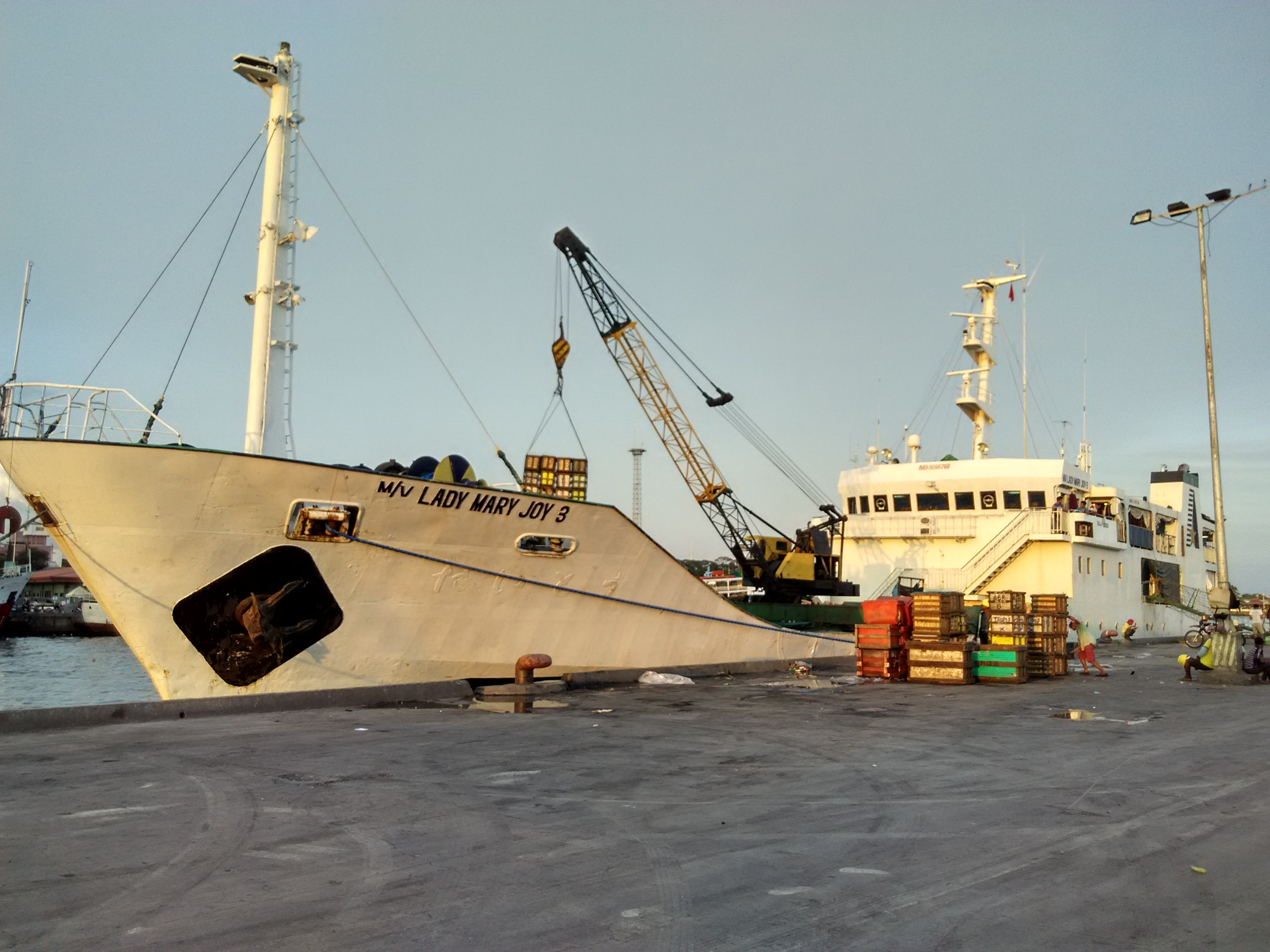
- MV Lady Mary Joy 3 at Zamboanga International Seaport

History
- Name: Lady Mary Joy 3
- Owner: Aleson Shipping Lines
- Operator: Aleson Shipping Lines
- Port of registry: Port of Zamboanga, Philippines
- Route: Zamboanga City - Jolo, Sulu
- Builder: Yamanaka Shipbuilding & Iron Works Imabari, Japan
- Completed: 1990
- Acquired: July 2011
- Identification: IMO number: 9006760; MMSI number: 548032400; Callsign: DUJ2272
- Status: Caught fire on March 29, 2023; currently inactive
- Notes: MV Daito up until July 2011

General characteristics
- Type: Passenger Ferry
- Tonnage: 835 tons
- Length: 73m

MV Lady Mary Joy 3 is a passenger ferry owned and operated by Aleson Shipping Lines. Originally known as MV Daito, she was acquired by Aleson Shipping in July 2011.

== Career ==
By the time she was commissioned for Aleson Shipping Lines, she became the regular ferry for Zamboanga City to Jolo, Sulu.

Following the incident involving MV Danica Joy in September 2016, the Philippine Embassy in Malaysia demanded an alternative transport for Sandakan, Malaysia to Zamboanga City knowing that the number of Filipino deportees in Sabah numbered at 7,000. At that time, MV Danica Joy was the lone ferry that served the Zamboanga City - Sandakan route and the operator, Aleson Shipping Lines was suspended for a month to operate the said route. When the suspension was lifted in November 2016, MV Lady Mary Joy 3 was temporarily assigned to ferry the deportees back to the Philippines while MV Kristel Jane 2 took the Zamboanga City - Jolo route.

== 2023 fire ==
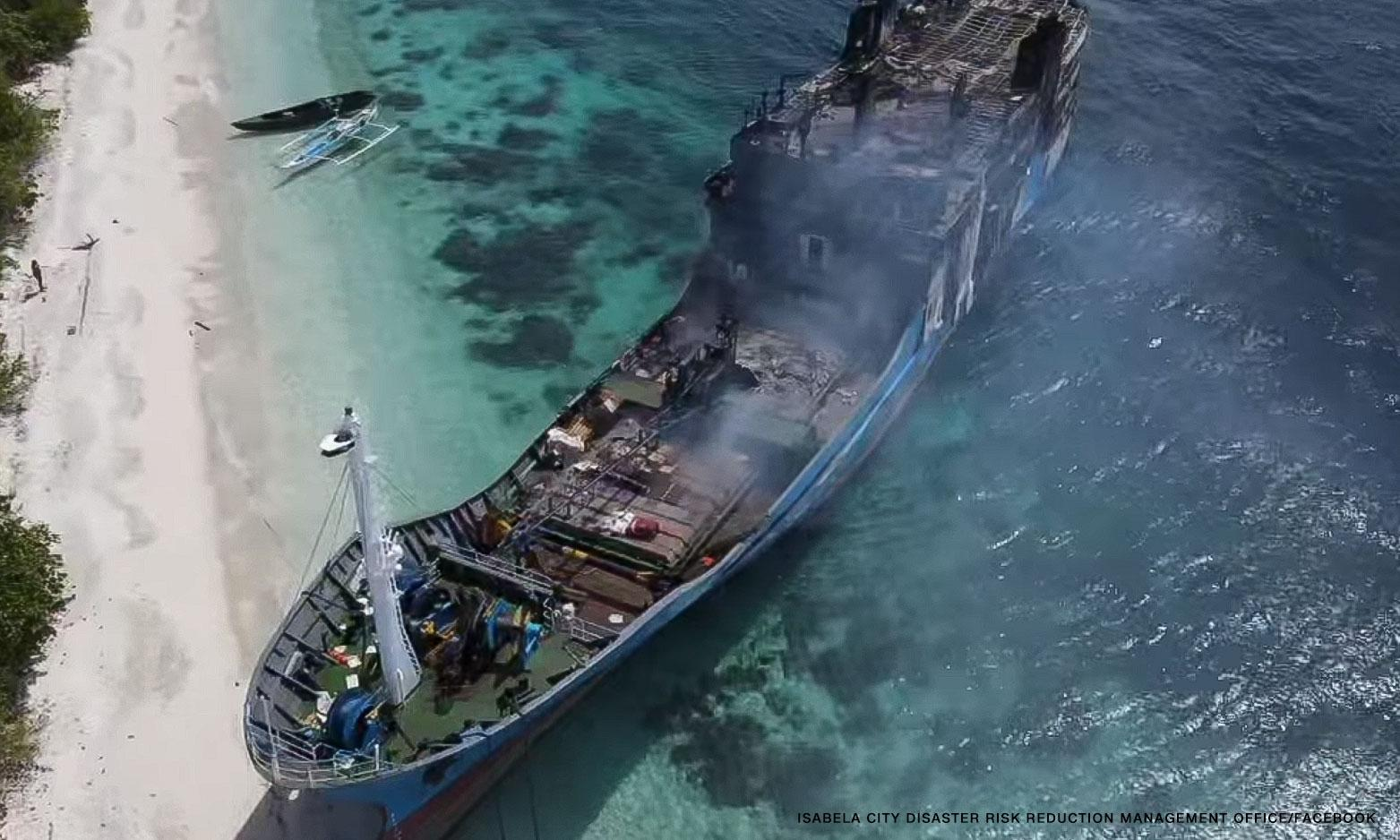
Lady Mary Joy 3 fire aftermath

On March 29, 2023, MV Lady Mary Joy 3 caught fire off Baluk-Baluk Island, Hadji Muhtamad, Basilan while traveling to Jolo, Sulu from Zamboanga City. The fire, which began around 10:40 p.m., lasted until 7:30 a.m. of the following day. She was towed to the province's coast and beached.

The Philippine Coast Guard (PCG) reported on April 5 that the ferry was carrying a total of 249 individuals; (Note: That consisted of: A 35-member crew and at least 205 passengers, twenty of them are from the Army, according to the manifest.; A security contingent of four Coast Guard and five Army personnel.) 216 of them survived. (Note: Survivors include the entire crew and all Coast Guard marshals, as well as twenty-three of the soldiers. However, Basilan PDRRMO, by April 4, reported 223 survivors.) Thirty-three deaths were reported by April 13. (Note: Fatalities include: First to be reported were eleven drowned and seventeen whose burned remains were later recovered inside the ferry.; Five more bodies were later retrieved: one near Sicagot Island on April 4 and two between Lampinigan and Baluk-Baluk Islands, April 5; one near Langgas Island, April 9; one off Hadji Mohammad Ajul, April 11.; Upon the recovery of the remains of the last missing passenger, the PCG, on April 13, said all are accounted for. However, the Basilan Provincial Disaster Risk Reduction and Management Office (PDRRMO) said two more passengers remain missing based on the list gathered in coordination with the Sulu PDRRMO, considering that 16 of the 18 listed names of those missing are those still unidentified charred remains.) Search, rescue, and retrieval operations became difficult due to an inaccurate manifest; as well as identification of the burned remains of the reported fatalities.

According to the Bureau of Fire Protection, the most probable cause of fire is an electric short circuit.

== See also ==
- MV Trisha Kerstin 3
