= Sinking of MV Trisha Kerstin 3 =

2026 maritime disaster in the Philippines

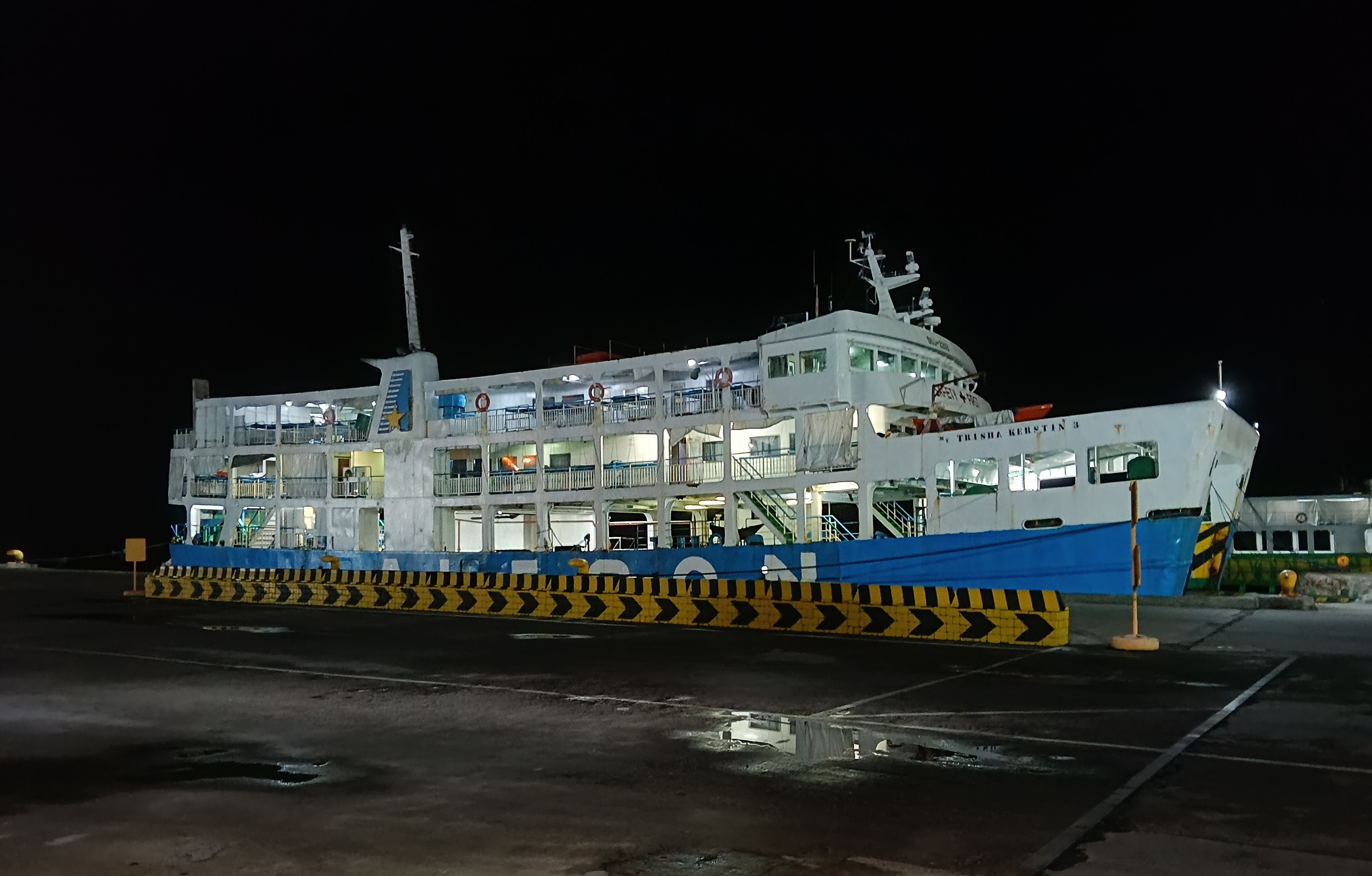
- The MV Trisha Kerstin 3, seven months prior to the incident
- Date: January 26, 2026
- Location: Off Baluk-Baluk Island, Sulu Sea, Philippines
- Cause: Strong waves flooding the lower deck
- Deaths: 66
- Missing: 12–28

On January 26, 2026, the roll-on/roll-off passenger ferry MV Trisha Kerstin 3 sank near Basilan province in the Bangsamoro region of the southern Philippines, leaving at least 66 people dead and between 12 and 28 others missing after it was revealed that multiple passengers were not listed in the ship's manifest. Another 293 were rescued.

== Background ==
The ferry was owned by Aleson Shipping Lines and carried 314 passengers and 27 crew members. Prior to its departure, 14 would-be passengers cancelled their reservations, while another failed to board the vessel on time. It left Zamboanga City at 21:20 PHT on January 25 (13:20 UTC) for Jolo, Sulu. It had a maximum capacity of 352 passengers, three decks and a length of 44 m (144 ft). There was no gale warning in the area at the time of the voyage, although the Philippine Coast Guard noted the occurrence of strong winds generated by the northeasterly amihan.

The vessel was built in 1995 and acquired by Aleson in 2010. In September 2010, it was modified to increase its passenger capacity from 152 to 352.

== Sinking ==
The ship sank in the early hours of January 26 at a distance of 5 km (3.1 mi) from Baluk-Baluk Island in the town of Hadji Muhtamad after it issued a distress call at 01:50 PHT (17:50 UTC on January 25). Strong waves flooded the vessel's lower deck, causing the ship to list and capsize on its starboard side after the harness securing vehicles onboard snapped. Several survivors said that there was a lack of life vests and an emergency alarm system aboard the vessel, although the Maritime Industry Authority (MARINA) said the ship had more than 500 life vests. Another survivor said that life vests had been locked away in violation of safety protocols. The ship was believed to have sunk at a depth of 76 m (249 ft).

At least 66 people died in the sinking, including an infant, a child, a crew member and the ship captain; while 12 others were reported missing, including eight crew members and a safety marshal from the Philippine Coast Guard (PCG). Conflicting numbers emerged as to the number of casualties, as the initial number of 18 deaths and 10 missing given by authorities on January 27 was contradicted with 11 bodies being recovered on January 29 as survivors said there were more passengers than previously thought. A group of survivors and relatives of the victims said that the number of missing reached 40, which was later lowered to 28. Another 316 were initially rescued, although the number was later lowered to 293.

The sinking was the first major incident involving Aleson Shipping Lines since a fire on the MV Lady Mary Joy 3 in 2023, which killed 31 people and also happened off Baluk-Baluk Island, and which led to MV Trisha Kerstin 3 replacing the ship on the Zamboanga City-Jolo route. The Department of Transportation (DOTR) later said that Aleson had incurred 32 safety-related incidents since 2019.

Rescue efforts were carried out by local watchmen, private vessels, the Armed Forces of the Philippines, and the PCG, which deployed the patrol vessels BRP Capones, BRP Melchora Aquino and BRP Tubbataha from Zamboanga City. It also prepared 16 divers and a remote operated vehicle to participate in search efforts. The Philippine Air Force also deployed a Black Hawk helicopter. Survivors were taken to Isabela, Basilan, and Zamboanga City. The ship's wreckage was found on February 3 by the PCG at a distance of 1.8 nautical miles off Baluk-Baluk Island and searched by divers on February 5. Rescue operations shifted to casualty recovery operations on February 4, after the PCG ruled that survival of the missing was no longer feasible. Full underwater searches were concluded on February 23, by which time 22 bodies had been recovered from the wreck, although the PCG said that diving operations to ensure complete searches of the vessel would continue until February 26.

== Aftermath ==
Following the sinking, the DOTR grounded Aleson Shipping Lines's entire passenger fleet pending an investigation and ordered MARINA and the PCG to conduct a maritime safety audit of the company and its crew, along with a nationwide audit of the domestic shipping industry. The suspension caused major travel disruption along the Zamboanga City-Basilan route, particularly in Lamitan, which is served solely by Aleson. On January 30, a resolution was filed in the Bangsamoro Parliament seeking to bar Aleson from operating in the Bangsamoro.

The Department of Social Welfare and Development provided ₱10,000 (US$203.05) each to the families of two fatalities and pledged ₱5,000 (US$101.52) each in financial assistance to 134 survivors. The provincial government of Basilan provided ₱1.2 million (US$24,365.48) in financial assistance to 223 survivors brought to the province along with relatives of the dead. The Office of the Vice President of the Philippines also provided ₱2,500 (US$50.76) in financial assistance to each passenger, while vice president Sara Duterte meet with relatives of the victims and survivors in Jolo and Zamboanga City.

== Investigation ==
On February 11, the DOTR said it found multiple safety violations from Aleson Shipping Lines, including an excess of passengers not included in its manifest and failure to weigh vehicles boarding the ferry as required by law, while MARINA confirmed that the crew failed to inform passengers of the safety procedures as the ship began to list. The ship was also found to be 31 years old, exceeding its retirement age. The DOTR subsequently filed charges against three MARINA officials for issuing the ship with safety certificates, while six PCG officials were suspended and four PCG personnel dismissed.

== See also ==
- List of roll-on/roll-off vessel accidents
- List of maritime disasters in the Philippines
