= Shoppers' Chain of Stores =

Shoppers' Chain of Stores is a chain of department stores and supermarkets based in Zamboanga City, Philippines. Shoppers' Chain of Stores started its operations with the opening of Shoppers' Plaza in 1981. The recent branch of Shoppers' Chain of Stores is Shoppers' Center, which was opened in 2008. Its head and sales office is located at the Huylian Building, Tomas Ongpin St., Binondo, Manila where Shoppers' Mart is located, while its warehouses are located in downtown Zamboanga.

== Shoppers' branches ==
=== Huylian Development Corporation, Inc. ===
Name	Address	Opened	Store Type
Shoppers' Plaza	Mayor C. Climaco Ave., Zamboanga City	1981	Department Store/Supermarket
Shoppers' Square	Gov. Lim Ave., Zamboanga City	1982	Department Store
Shoppers' Mart	Tomas Ongpin St., Binondo, Manila	1988	Supermarket
Expression Mobile Center (former Shoppers' Mart)	Gov. Lim Ave., Zamboanga City	2002	Mobile Telecommunications Retail
Expression Mobile Center (former Shoppers' Mart)	Shoppers' Center, Zamboanga City	-	Mobile Telecommunications Retail
Expression Mobile Center (former Shoppers' Mart)	CityMall, Dipolog	2018	Mobile Telecommunications Retail
Expression Mobile Center (former Shoppers' Mart)	Climaco Drive, Ipil, Zamboanga Sibugay	2019	Mobile Telecommunications Retail
Shoppers' Mall	Mayor C. Climaco cor. San Jose Road, Zamboanga City	pending indefinitely	Mall

=== ACLEM Properties, Inc. ===
Name	Address	Opened	Store Type
Shoppers' Central	Tomas Claudio St., Zamboanga City	1989	Department Store/Supermarket
Shoppers' Emporium (closed 2012)	Mayor C. Climaco Ave., Zamboanga City	?	Department Store
Shoppers' Center	Gov. Lim Ave., Zamboanga City	2008	Mid-size mall

Shoppers' Central will close its shopping operations on February 28, 2024, following the rumours that the store will close. However, Maker Sales Center, a department store chain based in the city, confirmed the takeover of Shoppers' Central, this information came from a business insider in the city.

== Incidents ==
In 2002, a bomb placed near Shoppers' Central was exploded, having killed one person. While five individuals died on arrival to the hospital, several people were critically wounded. It is said that the bombings were coming from the Abu Sayyaf Group days after the October 11 bombing incident in Bali, Indonesia. Shoppers' Central was one of the stores being heavily affected by bombs. Earlier, another bomb exploded at the Shop-o-Rama area.

In 2011, the Bureau of Internal Revenue- Zamboanga Office ordered the closure of all five Shoppers' stores due to failure of the owners to comply with the payment in 48 hours. Officials of the Bureau of Internal Revenue (BIR) padlocked five big department stores for failing to remit P54 million worth of expanded value added tax (EVAT) to the government for the year 2011. The management of Shoppers' Chain of Stores had hoped that the BIR will allow them to reopen its stores, having the BIR Zamboanga accepted the partial payment of P5 million a week before its closure, coupled with the appeal for reconsideration and recomputation of taxes due. Mayor Celso Lobregat intervened with the employees of Shoppers' stores that led to the lifting of BIR's order after accepting the said partial payment.

== See also ==
- List of shopping malls in Zamboanga City
- Zamboanga City
