= Ever Shipping Lines =

Filipino shipping company

- The letter "E" in Roman font with a green background is being used to all of their ships since their establishment in 1975.
- Company type: Private
- Industry: Shipping
- Founded: 1975
- Founder: Faustino Saavedra
- Headquarters: 47, Mutual Building, N.S. Valderroza Street, Zamboanga City, Philippines
- Area served: Zamboanga City, Bongao, Tawi-Tawi
- Services: RoRo Service, Shipping

Ever Shipping Lines Inc. is a company based in Zamboanga City with four ships, MV Ever Queen of Asia, MV Ever Queen Emilia, MV Ever Sweet and MV Rosalinda. They operate routes from Zamboanga City to Bongao, Tawi-Tawi, and Zamboanga City to Olutanga, Zamboanga Sibugay.

== History ==
Ever Shipping Lines was founded in the early 1970s by entrepreneur Faustino Saavedra founded Ever Trading in Zamboanga. By mid 1970s, the operations of the company expanded with the increase of the volume of products being handled by Ever trading. The management of the company decided to acquire its own transport facility became out of necessity. In 1975, Ever trading acquired its first cargo and passenger vessel. Saavedra, on the same year established Ever Lines, Inc. to augment distribution capabilities.

In February 2006, Ever Lines, introduced Phil National Lines, Inc. as their subsidiary. Phil National Lines is a company that is engaged in tanker business to serve Petroleum Companies under the supervision of Cargomarine Corporation.

In 2008, Faustino Saavedra was shot dead by two gunmen aboard on a motorcycle. He with his wife Floria Saavedra, was cruising Mayor Jaldon street in Canelar, Zamboanga City when this happen. It was believed that the gunmen were looking into extortion as a possible motive in the killing.

After Saavedra's lost, his wife and their family continued this shipping line business so as with the Ever Trading. However, it also resulted to Ever Shipping Lines Inc. to decline their operations by reducing their fleet, routes, and manpower.

== Ports of Call ==
Their ships' port of call is registered at the Port of Zamboanga according to Maritime Industry Authority.

== Routes ==
Current

Their available routes as of 2016:

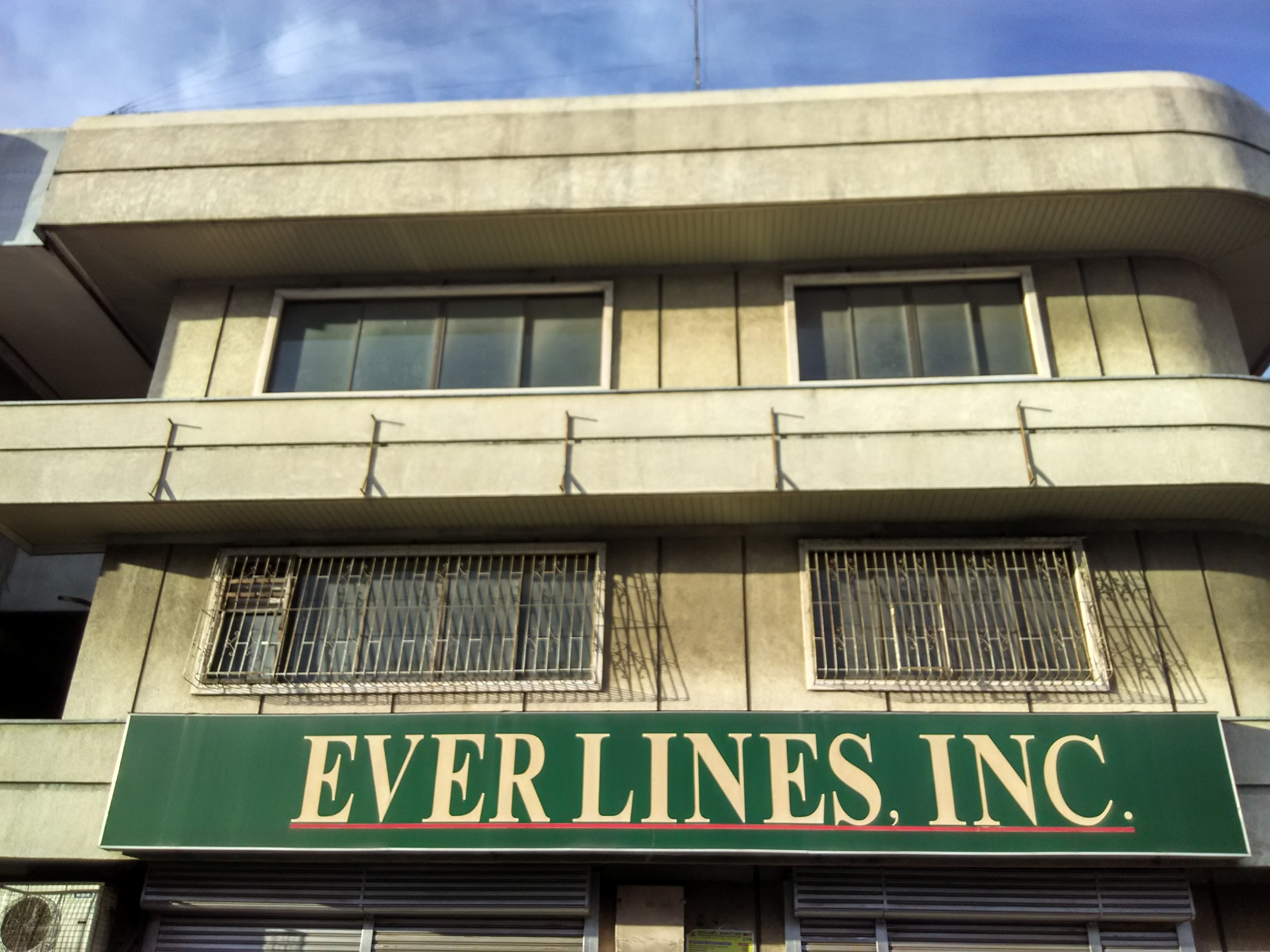
Headquarters of the Ever Shipping Lines Inc.

- Zamboanga City - Bongao, Tawi-Tawi
- Zamboanga City - Olutanga - Malangas

Former

Former routes of Ever Shipping Lines that is now left abandoned after reducing their fleets:

- Zamboanga City - Jolo

== Fleet ==
Ever Shipping Lines had 6 ships in 2013. As of 2016, the number of ships operated by the company is down to 4.

=== Current vessels ===
Name	Type	IMO number	Built	Entered service	Tonnage (tons)	Length (m)	Breadth (m)	Notes	Image
MV Ever Queen of Asia	Passenger/Ro-ro Cargo ship	7034440	1970	1998	498	54.01	10.24	former name: Shiraito	MV Ever Sweet in Zamboanga International Seaport
MV Ever Queen Emilia	Passenger/Ro-ro Cargo ship	8944824	1966		248	49.97	13.4	former name: Sea Olympia	MV Ever Queen Emilia in Zamboanga International Seaport
MV Ever Sweet	Passenger/Cargo Ship	8945165	1964		135				MV Ever Sweet at the Zamboanga International Seaport.
MV Rosalinda	Cargo ship	7724693	1977		586	65	11.5		

=== Former vessels ===
- MV Ever Queen of Hope
- MV Ever Queen of Pacific (also named as MV Ever Queen of Pacific 1)
- MV Ever Transport (until 2010)

== Subsidiaries ==
- Ever Trading
- Phil National Lines, Inc.
- Cargormarine Corporation

== See also ==
- List of shipping companies in the Philippines
- 2GO Travel
- Aleson Shipping Lines Inc.
- Weesam Express
- Cokaliong Shipping Lines
- Montenegro Shipping Lines
