= SRN Fast Seacrafts =

Fast Ferry company based in Zamboanga City, Philippines

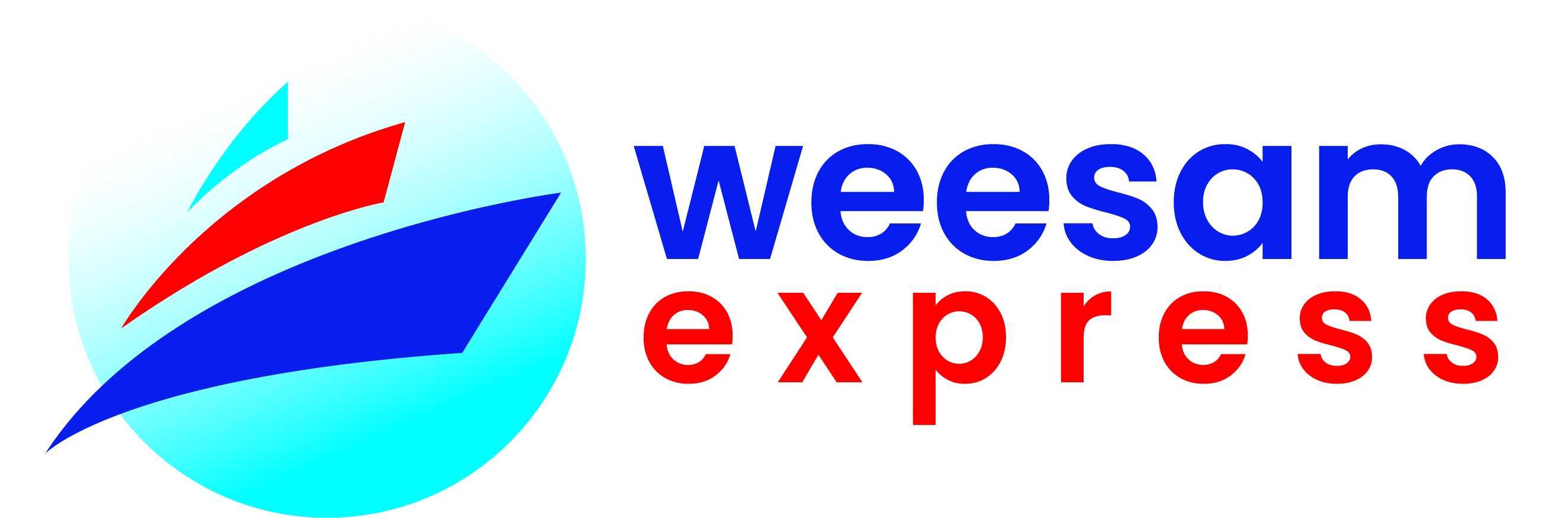
- Logo of Weesam Express
- Trade name: Weesam Express
- Company type: Private
- Industry: Shipping
- Founded: April 17, 1997; 29 years ago in Zamboanga City, Philippines
- Founders: Hadji Wahab A. Amil; Hadji Ahmad W. Sakaluran
- Headquarters: Amil's Tower, Pilar St.,, Zamboanga City, Philippines
- Area served: Mindanao and Visayas
- Key people: Hadji Wahab A. Amil (President); Hadji Shabree M.Amil (Vice President)
- Services: Passenger transportation
- Website: www.weesam.ph

SRN Fast Seacrafts, Inc. which operates the Weesam Express ferry line, is a company based in Zamboanga City, Philippines that operates a fleet of High speed crafts throughout the country.

The company was founded and headed by Hadji Ahmad W. Sakaluran and Hadji Wahab A. Amil his nephew in Zamboanga City. Established on April 17, 1997, it started with a vessel plying from Zamboanga City to Sandakan, Malaysia, making Weesam one of the initial shipping companies plying the BIMP-EAGA route directly from Zamboanga City to Sandakan, Sabah, Malaysia.

Weesam Express currently serves 6 ports of call as of August 2025.

== History ==
The idea for establishing a new passenger ferry service in Southern Philippines began during the inaugural voyage of the MS Express, a vessel owned by A. Sakaluran Shipping Corporation. The voyage took place on February 19, 1997, with Hadji Ahmad W. Sakaluran, the company president, at the helm. Among the guests on board was his nephew, Hadji Wahab A. Amil.

During the voyage, the two conferred, and Hadji Ahmad W. Sakaluran encouraged his nephew to venture into the passenger ferry business, noting that the vastness of the sea could accommodate many players. During this conversation, Hadji Ahmad W. Sakaluran recommended the undersigned to assist in preparing all the necessary documentation to establish and operate a passenger ferry company based in Zamboanga City.

This discussion eventually led to the formation of SRN Fast Seacrafts, Inc., officially registered with the Securities and Exchange Commission on May 13, 1997. The company was spearheaded by Hadji Wahab A. Amil, with its goal set on operating fast passenger ferries in the southern Philippines. Around this time, SRN Fast Seacrafts began its initial operations by managing the MV Lady Mary Joy 1 of Aleson Shipping Lines, serving as its Hepe de Viaje (Chief of Voyage). This vessel was notably the only one at the time servicing the BIMP-EAGA (Brunei-Indonesia-Malaysia-Philippines East ASEAN Growth Area) route, specifically between Zamboanga City and Sandakan, Sabah, Malaysia.

A few days after these developments, the undersigned returned from Sandakan, which prompted the next phase: acquiring vessels and formally organizing operations. The first acquisition was a steel-hulled passenger boat from the operator of the Bullet Express, purchased at the Yong Choo Kui Shipyard in Sibu, Sarawak, Malaysia. The vessel was renamed MV Weesam Express, after the youngest son of Hadji Wahab A. Amil, Weesam.

MV Weesam Express embarked on its maiden voyage on September 21, 1997, on the Zamboanga City to Jolo, Sulu route. This marked the beginning of Weesam Express, the brand under which SRN Fast Seacrafts would operate its fleet.

As operations grew, Weesam Express expanded into the Visayas region. New routes were established, including Cebu City to Ormoc and Cebu City to Dumaguete to Dapitan. However, due to the competitive pricing offered by Aleson Shipping Lines, the Zamboanga City to Sandakan route was eventually discontinued.

Despite this, the company continued expanding its network, later introducing the Zamboanga City to Isabela City, Basilan route—further establishing Weesam Express as a vital link in maritime transportation in Southern Philippines.

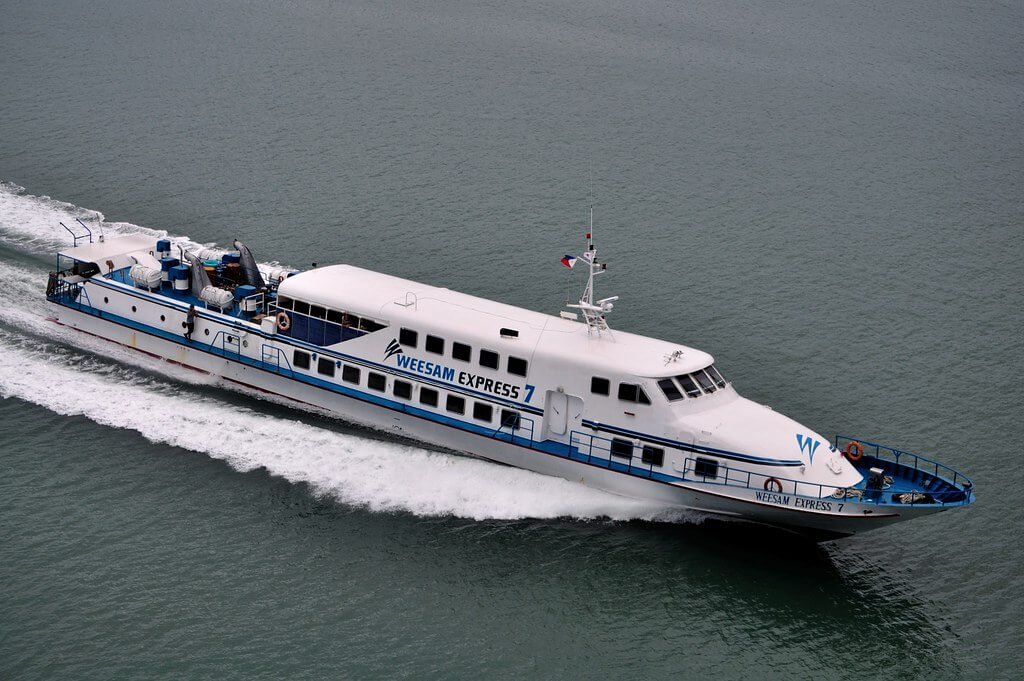
SRN Weesam Express 7

== Ports of Call and Routes ==
=== Ports of call ===
These are their ports of call as of August 2025:

- Bacolod City
- Cebu City
- Iloilo City
- Tagbilaran City
- Tubigon
- Isabela City

=== Routes ===
These are their routes as of August 2025:

Current

- Cebu City - Tubigon
- Iloilo City - Bacolod
- Zamboanga City - Jolo, Sulu
- Zamboanga City - Isabela, Basilan

Former

- Cebu City - Maasin
- Cebu City - Ormoc
- Cebu City - Tagbilaran
- Zamboanga City - Sandakan, Sabah, Malaysia
- Zamboanga City - Bongao, Tawi-Tawi
- Dapitan - Dumaguete
- San Carlos City, Negros Occidental - Toledo City, Cebu

== Fleet ==
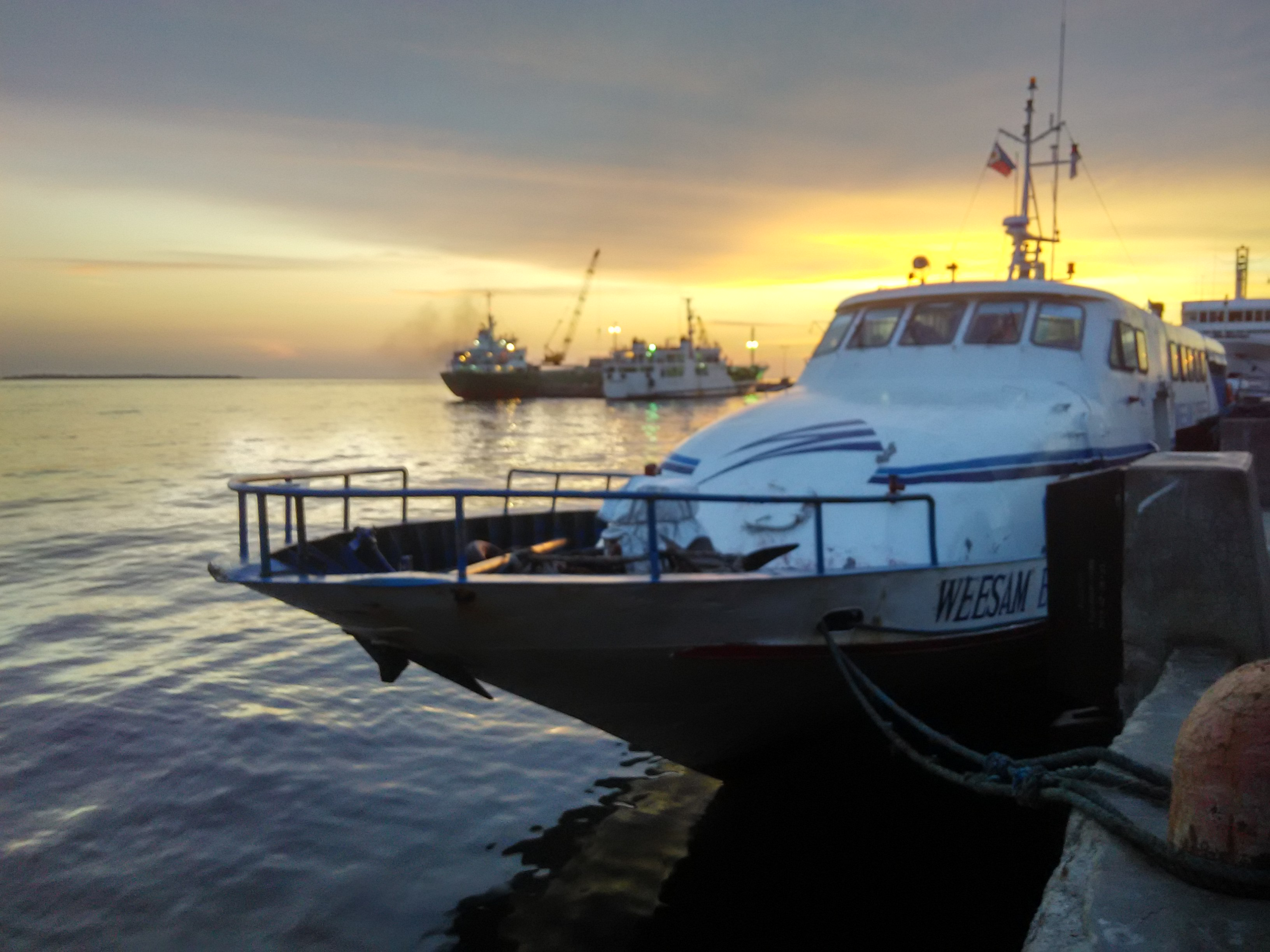
Weesam Express 7 at the Zamboanga International Seaport.

The shipping line has seven passenger vessels. All of its vessels are registered at the Port of Zamboanga:

- Weesam Express 1
- Weesam Express 2
- Weesam Express 3
- Weesam Express 5
- Weesam Express 6
- Weesam Express 7
- Weesam Express 8 (out of service, sank in the Port of Zamboanga.)

== Subsidiary ==
- A. Sakaluran Shipping Corporation (defunct)
- Amil's Tower Hotel and Restaurant

== Notable incidents ==
- On July 23, 2013, Weesam Express 7 was tossed by the waves and strong winds at around 8:00 in the morning while it was about to leave from Ormoc to Cebu. The fast craft reportedly failed to start and it floated away, hapless to the merciless elements. It ran aground at Bagsakan in Brgy. Alegria, around 10 meters from shore and 100 meters away from the port. Some of the passengers, including a 63-year old foreign national had to be brought to the hospital for hypertension due to the incident.
- On January 23, 2014, Weesam Express 7 with at least 160 passengers aboard yet again ran aground off Talisay in Cebu province. All passengers had been rescued. A week later, the vessel was temporarily suspended by the Maritime Industry Authority (Marina) over seaworthiness issues.
- On October 7, 2025, Weesam Express 8 capsized while docked at the Port of Zamboanga. The boat crew initially observed water seeping into the vessel at around 3 am. prompting the crew to pump out the water. But water continued to pour in, prompting the captain to order everyone to evacuate while the vessel continued to list on its side. By around 5:20 am, the vessel was completely submerged with only a part of it visible above the waterline. The captain attributed the mishap to damage in the engine room combined with strong waves at the Port of Zamboanga.

== See also ==
- List of shipping companies in the Philippines
- Aleson Shipping Lines
- 2GO Travel
- Montenegro Lines
- Ever Shipping Lines Inc.
- Trans-Asia Shipping Lines

== Notes ==
- Everything Cebu - Weesam Express
- Transit: Going to Tawi-tawi
