= Aleson Shipping Lines =

Shipping company based in Zamboanga City, Philippines

Aleson Shipping Lines Inc.
- Logo of Aleson Shipping Lines

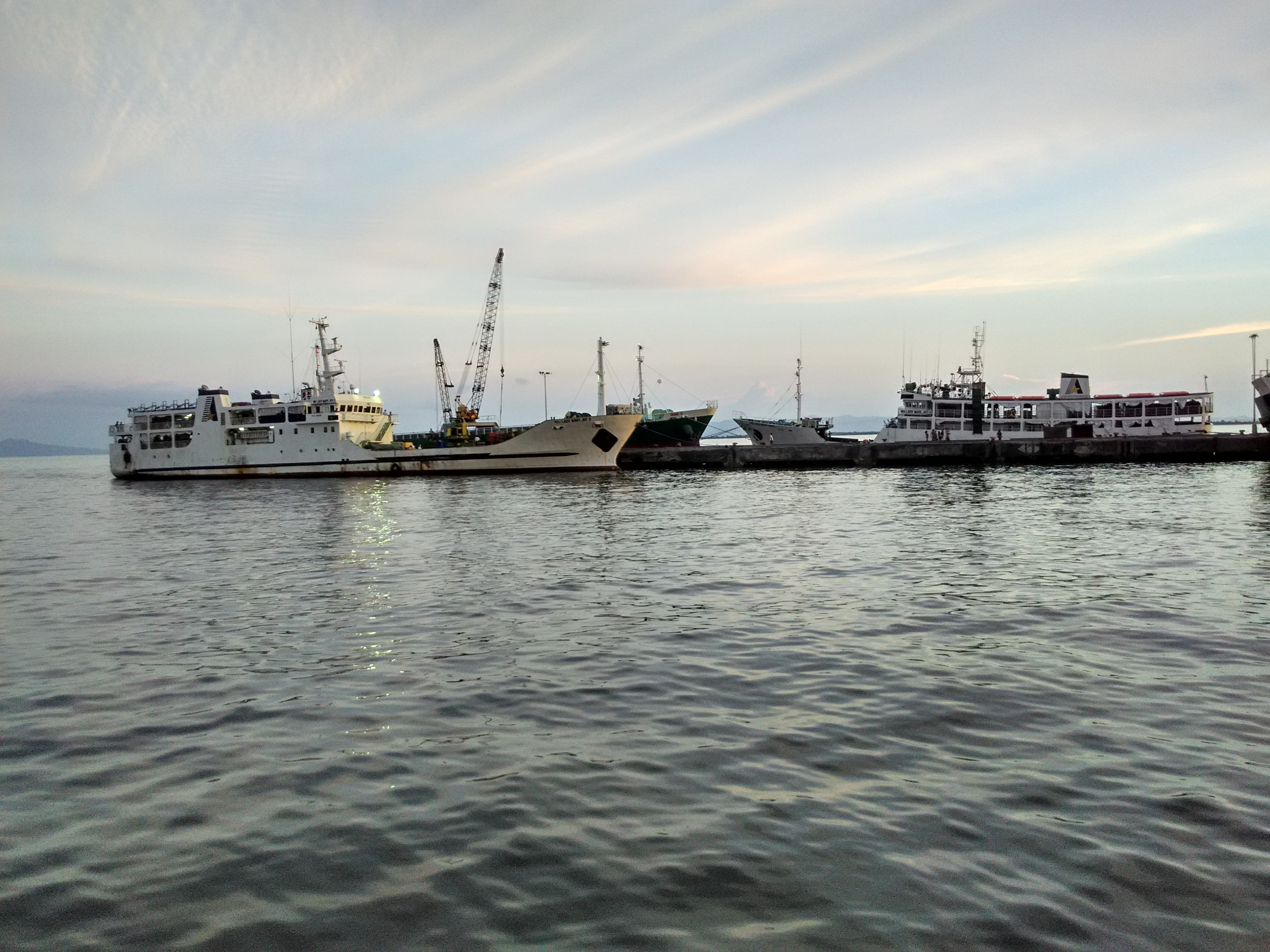
- MV Lady Mary Joy 1 (Right) and MV Lady Mary Joy 3 (Left) of Aleson Shipping Lines at the Zamboanga International Seaport
- Type: Private
- Industry: Shipping
- Founded: October 1, 1976; 50 years ago in Zamboanga City, Philippines
- Headquarters: 172, Mayor Agan Avenue, Zamboanga City, Philippines
- Area served: Zamboanga City, Basilan, Jolo, Sulu, Bongao, Tawi-Tawi, Dapitan, Dumaguete, Cebu, Bohol, and Sandakan
- Services: RoRo Service, Shipping
- Website: aleson-shipping.com alesonshippinglinesinc.com

Aleson Shipping Lines, Inc. is a shipping company based in Zamboanga City, Philippines. Their services include routes to Sandakan, Malaysia and over Dapitan to Dumaguete. They also ship cargo from Zamboanga City to Manila with 12 of their container carriers.

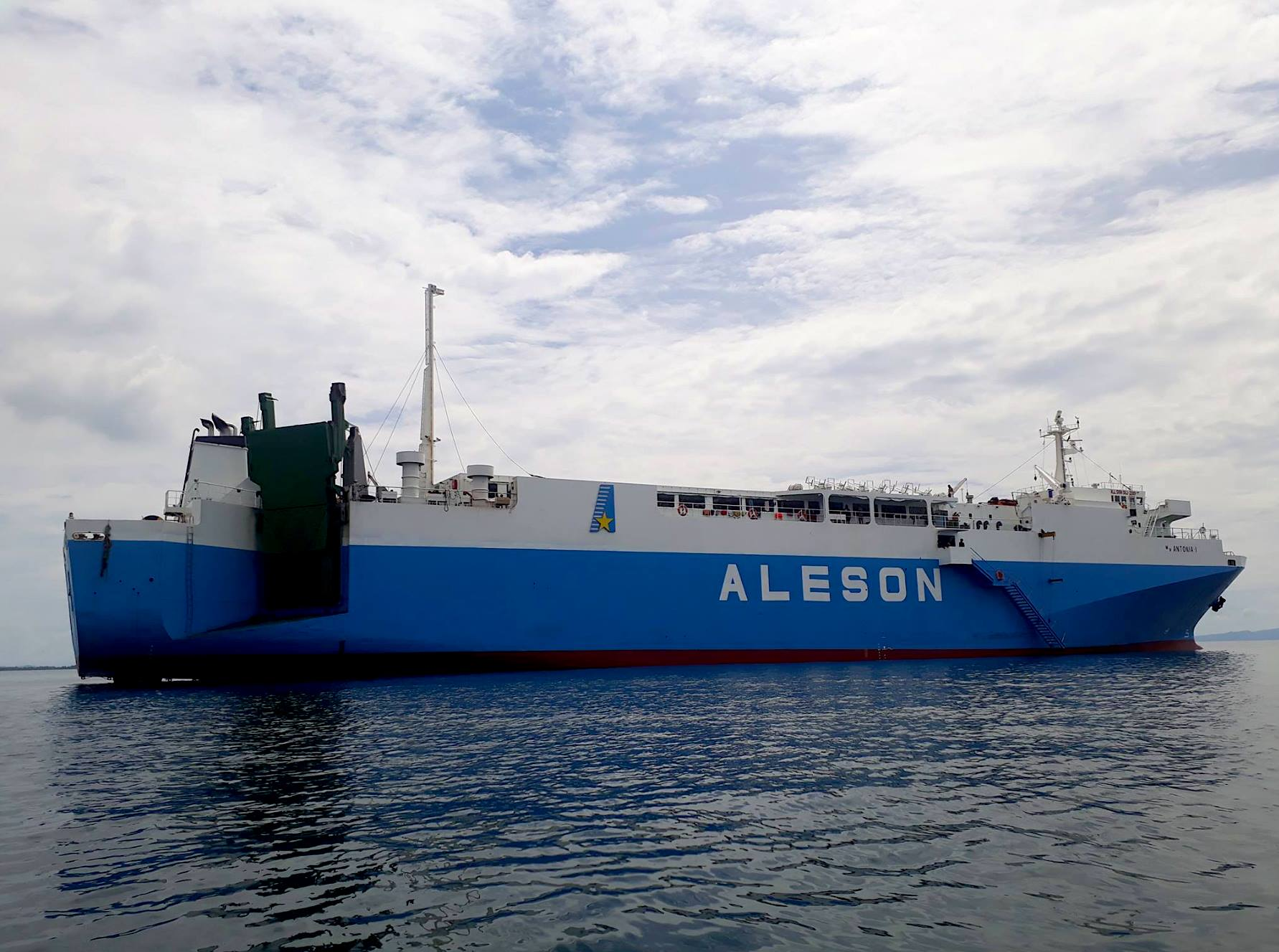
Aleson MV Antonia (Flagship)

== History ==
The company was founded on October 1, 1976, and its first vessel MV Estrella del Mar transported passengers and cargo, mainly rice, to the neighboring islands. In 1980, the company acquired its first cargo vessel, thus the debut of MV Aleson.

The company expanded in the 1980s with more cargo ships, along with voyages to Singapore for trade and commerce purposes.

During the 1990s the company concentrated on the passenger and roll-on/roll-off ferry sector. Additional vessels were added to carry more passengers and travel on more routes. In 1994, a new route between Zamboanga Port and Sandakan Port, Malaysia, was opened in response to the development of BIMP-EAGA routes. Aleson's MV Danica Joy was one of the first vessels that sailed on this route.

In 1999, the company expanded into containerizing cargo, with the addition of new container carriers. The first fast craft of the corporation was bought on 2004 and was named MV Seajet.

As of 2026, Aleson operates a fleet of 37 vessels and is the largest shipping operator in Western Mindanao.

== Ports of call ==
Aleson Shipping Lines Inc. main port of call is Zamboanga City, but some of their ships are actively in service for Manila, Dapitan, Dumaguete, Bongao, Isabela, Basilan and Lamitan.

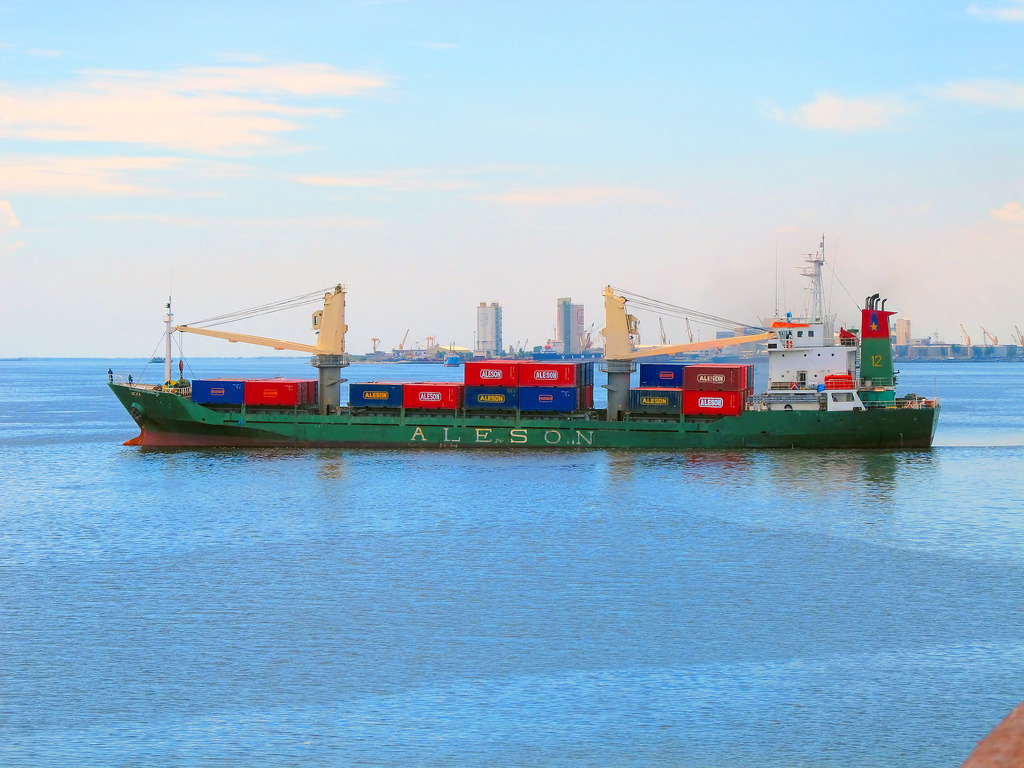
Aleson Shipping Lines Container Carrier 12

== Routes ==
- Zamboanga City - Isabela, Basilan
- Zamboanga City - Lamitan, Basilan
- Zamboanga City - Jolo, Sulu
- Zamboanga City - Bongao, Tawi-Tawi
- Zamboanga City - Sandakan, Malaysia
- Zamboanga City - Siasi
- Dapitan City - Dumaguete
- Dumaguete City - Siquijor, Siquijor
- Manila - Bacolod - Zamboanga City*

*for cargoes only

== Fleet ==
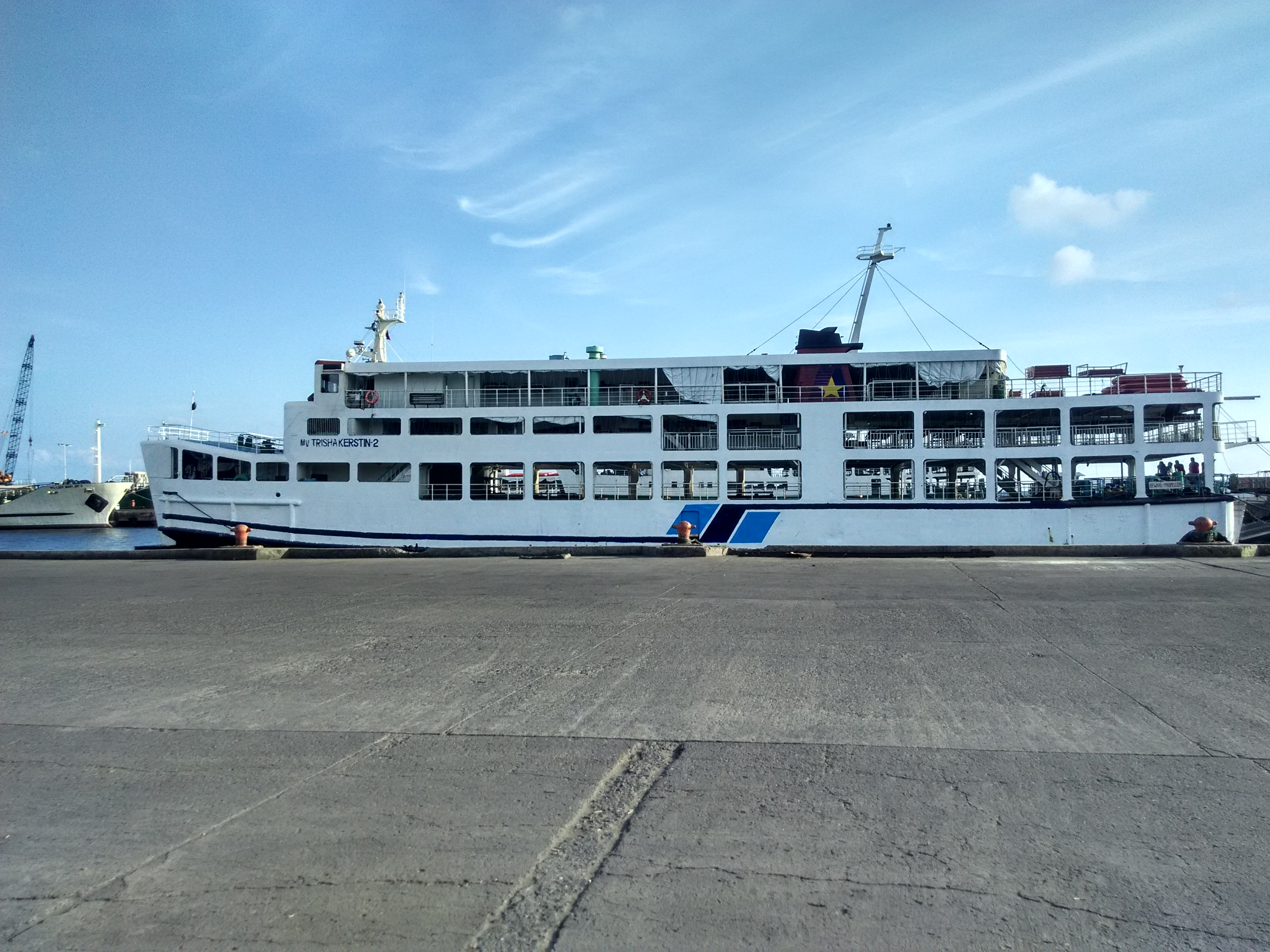
MV Trisha Kerstin 2 in Zamboanga International Seaport

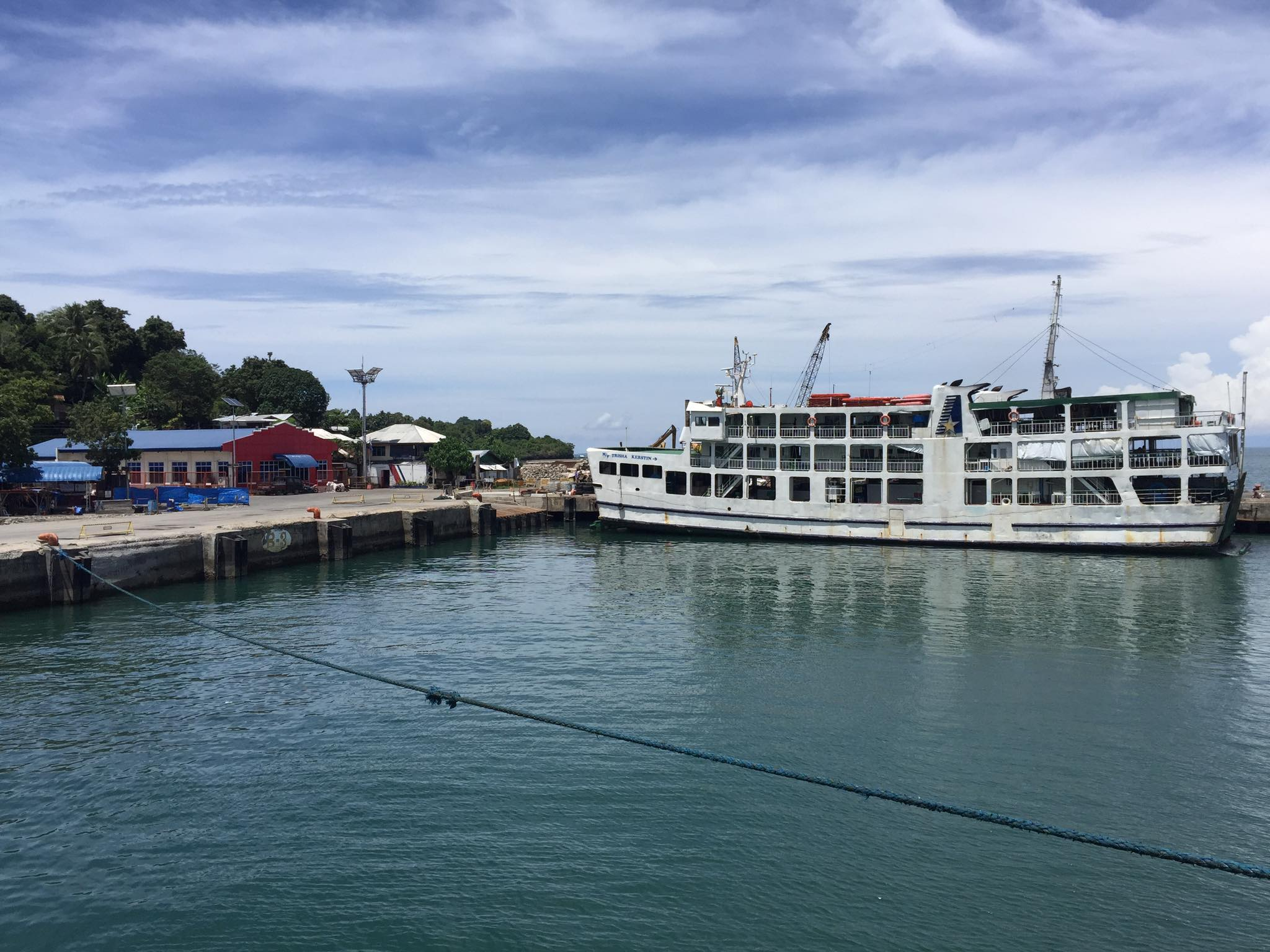
MV Trisha Kerstin 3 in Port of Dapitan

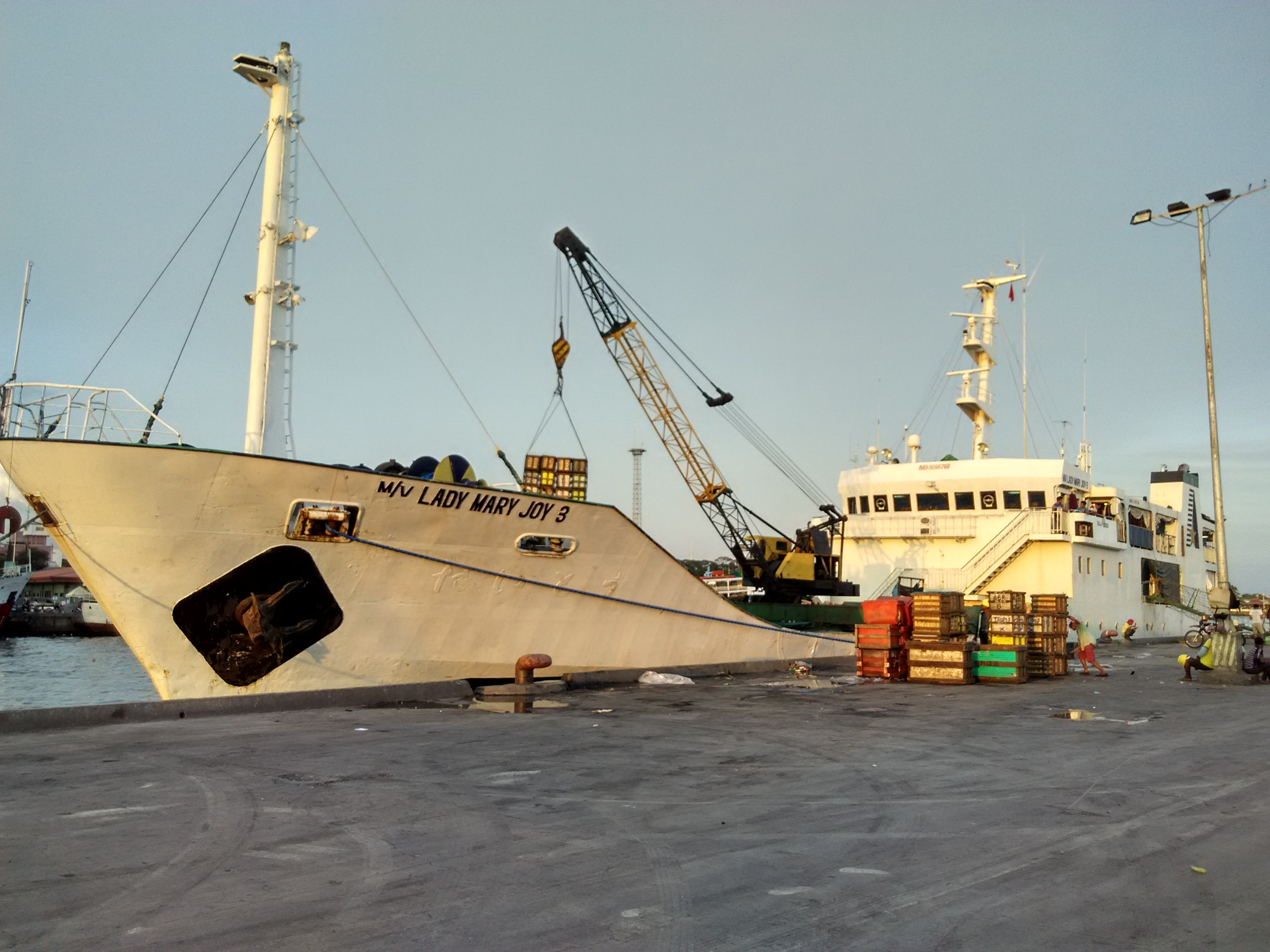
MV Lady Mary Joy 3 in Zamboanga International Seaport

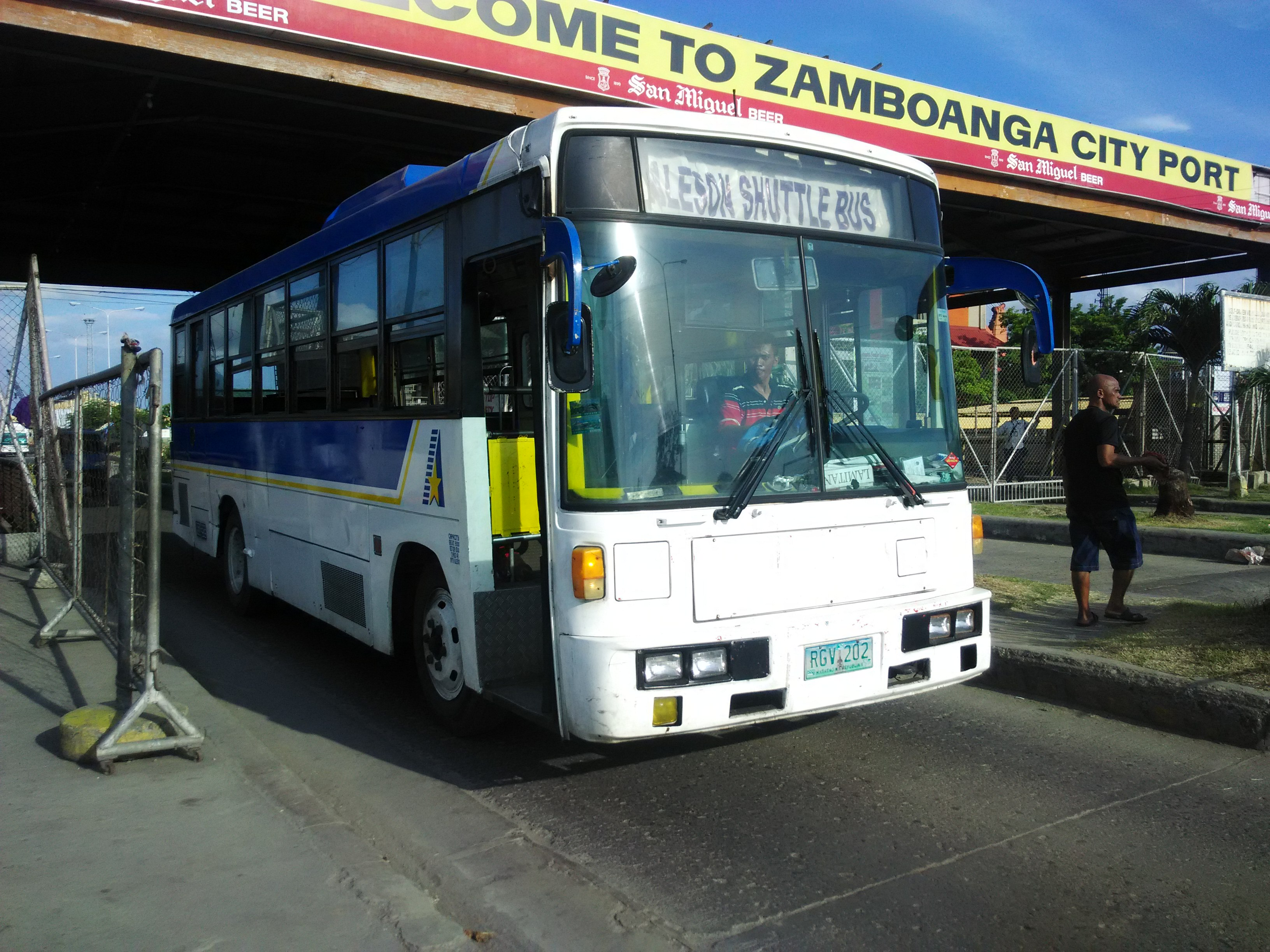
Bus shuttle of Aleson Shipping Lines, carrying passengers from terminal to port and vice versa

Current (as of November 2026)

- MV Antonia (Current flagship)
- MV Antonia 2
- MV Antonia 5 (Coming soon)
- MV Danica Joy 1 (Currently half-submerged at a shipyard in Zamboanga in 2026)
- MV Danica Joy 2
- MV Lady Mary Joy 1 (Currently out of service)
- MV Lady Mary Joy 3
- MV Kristel Jane 2
- MV Kristel Jane 3
- MV Kristel Jane 5
- MV Anika Gayle
- MV Anika Gayle 2 (Capsized at a shipyard in Zamboanga in 2026)
- MV Stephanie Marie
- MV Stephanie Marie 2
- MV Ciara Joie
- MV Ciara Joie 2
- MV Ciara Joie 3
- MV Ciara Joie 5
- MV Ciara Joie 7
- MV Ciara Joie 8
- MV Trisha Kerstin 1
- MV Trisha Kerstin 2
- MV SeaJet
- MV Nico Bryan
- MV Estrella Del Mar
- MV Aleson Con-Carrier 1
- MV Aleson Con-Carrier 2
- MV Aleson Con-Carrier 3
- MV Aleson Con-Carrier 5
- MV Aleson Con-Carrier 6
- MV Aleson Con-Carrier 8
- MV Aleson Con-Carrier 9
- MV Aleson Con-Carrier 10
- MV Aleson Con-Carrier 11
- MV Aleson Con-Carrier 12
- MV Aleson Con-Carrier 14
- MV Aleson Con-Carrier 15

Former

- MV Danica Joy
- MV Lady Mary Joy 2
- MV Estrella Del Mar
- MV Aleson
- MV Trisha Kerstin 3

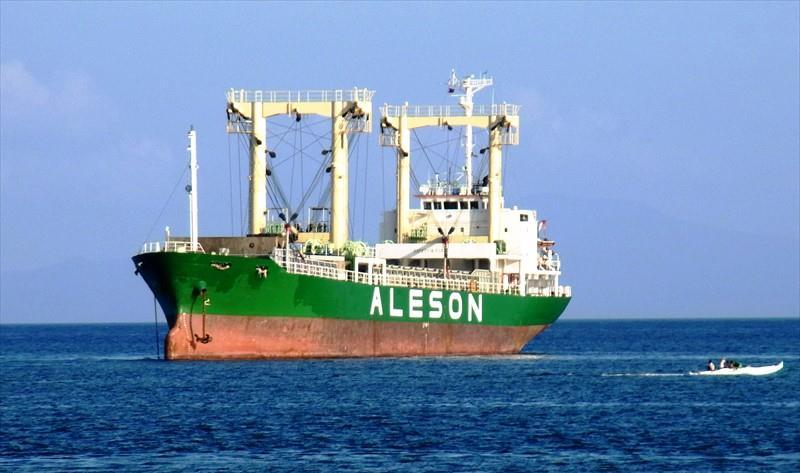
Aleson Con Carrier 15

== Notable incidents ==
- On July 14, 2002, MV Aleson Container Carrier 5 collided with Candano Shipping's MV Romeo off Apo Cement Corporation's wharf in Naga, Cebu. MV Aleson's front hull hit the side of MV Romeo which sunk immediately along with 31,250 bags of cement worth ₱3,427,500. One person, the skipper of MV Romeo, was found dead in the water by rescuers.
- On March 8, 2003, MV Ciara Joie, a ro-ro vessel en route to Iloilo with 87 passengers and 19 crew members, capsized off Bacolod. The ship tilted when a forklift slipped off the gangplank and dropped a container van it was loading. It sank 40 minutes later and spilled 2,000 liters of diesel fuel. There were no casualties, however it was reported that a leg of a ship apprentice was broken during the accident.
- On February 18, 2016, MV Lady Mary Joy 1 with 308 passengers and 38 crew members grounded off Pampat Point at Bongao island, Philippines. The ship was en route from Zamboanga City to Bongao, but due to human mistake and strong winds grounded in a rocky shallow. The ship hardly stuck and was unable to refloat by own power, requesting assistance from the local authorities. At the scene of the accident were dispatched several rescue boats, which evacuated all the passengers to the shore. According to preliminary information there are no injured people from the crew and guests on board. The authorities started investigation for the root cause of the accident.
- On September 22, 2016, MV Danica Joy arrived at 4:00 pm from Sandakan. But by around 9:30 pm, she went off-balance while moored at the Zamboanga International Seaport. The ship was carrying 799 passengers, including of which 11 Malaysians and one Australian, and 603 deportees. All passengers were unloaded earlier on, resulting to no casualties.
- On March 29, 2023, MV Lady Mary Joy 3 caught fire while plying the waters off Baluk-Baluk Island in Hadji Muhtamad, Basilan. It was reported that the ferry was carrying 249 individuals including 205 passengers and nine security personnel; all of the 35 crewmen and four Coast Guard marshalls were among the 216 survived; 33 others died. Although the cause of fire remains unclear, it is most probably an electric short circuit.
- On January 26, 2026, MV Trisha Kerstin 3 sank off Baluk-Baluk Island in Hadji Muhtamad, Basilan while travelling from Zamboanga City to Jolo, Sulu, leaving 65 people dead and 14 missing. Another 293 were rescued.

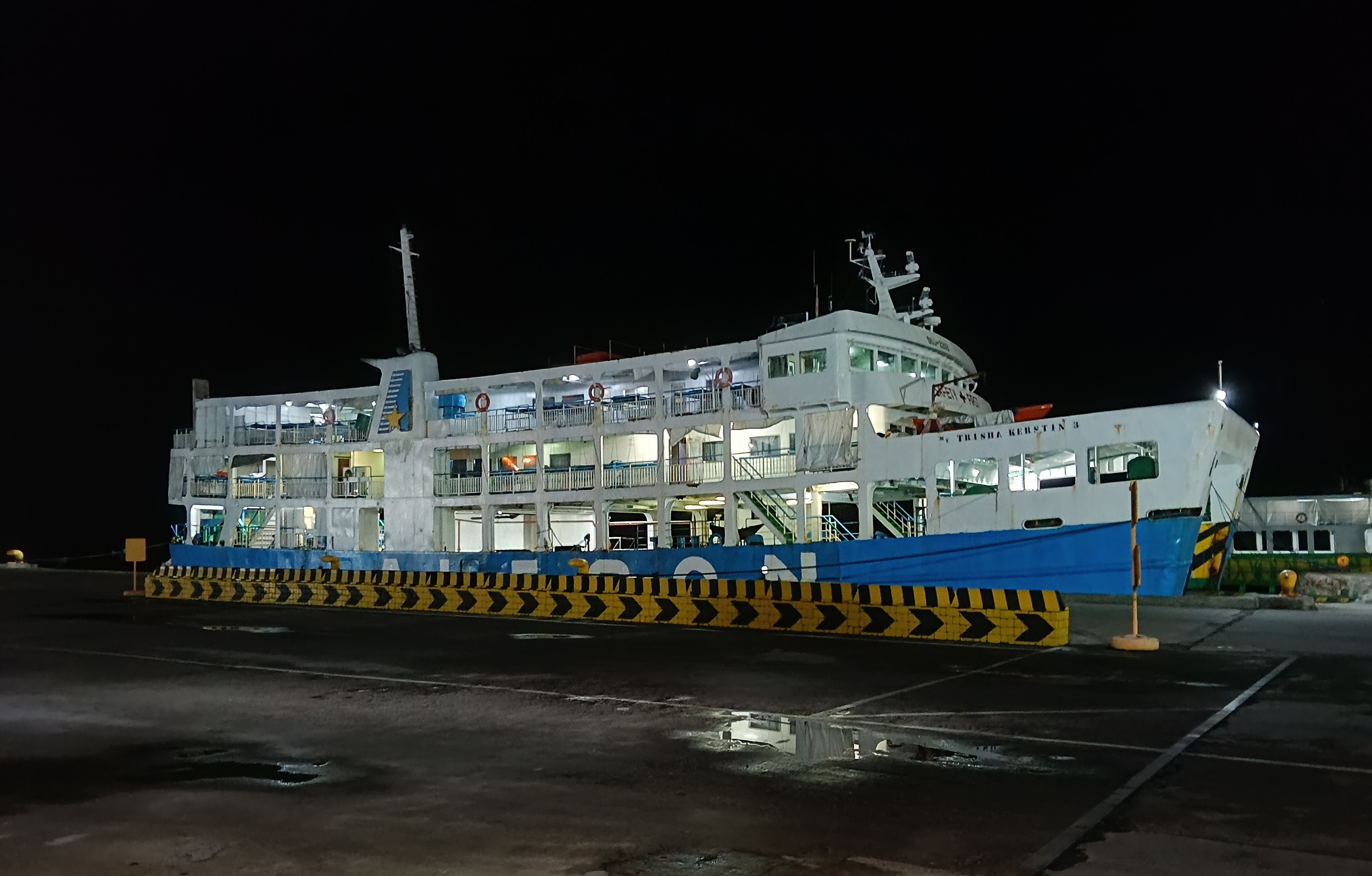
MV Trisha Kerstin 3, the ship involved in the incident.

== See also ==
- List of shipping companies in the Philippines
- 2GO Travel
- Weesam Express
- Ever Shipping Lines Inc.
- Cokaliong Shipping Lines
- Montenegro Shipping Lines
