= Port of Zamboanga =

Port of Zamboanga Puerto de Zamboanga
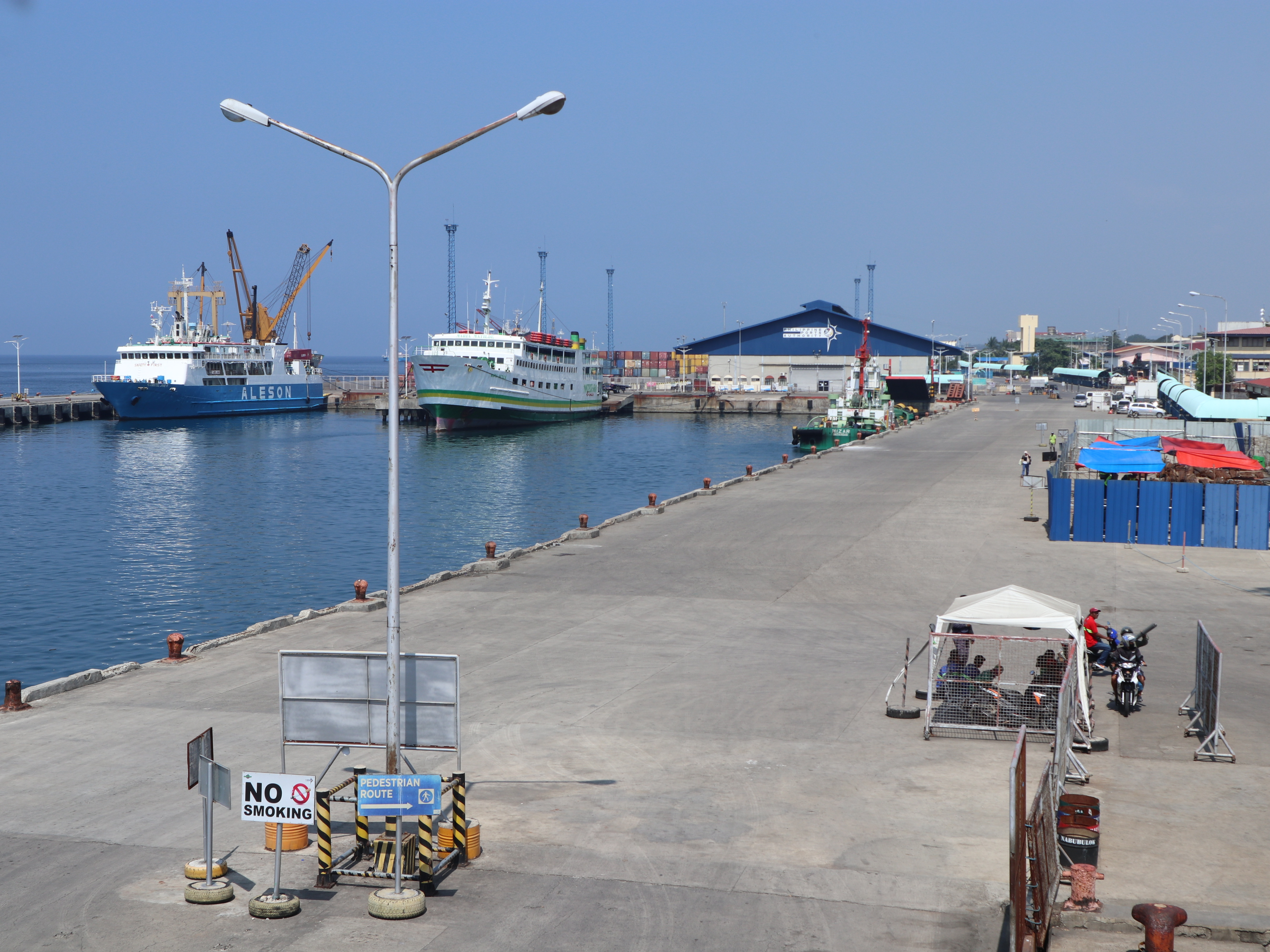

Location
- Country: Philippines
- Location: R.T. Lim Boulevard, Zamboanga City
- Coordinates: 14.608197°N 120.956245°E
- UN/LOCODE: PHZAM

Details
- Operated by: Zamboanga City Special Economic Zone Authority
- Owned by: Government
- Type of harbour: Artificial
- Land area: 15.6 hectares
- No. of wharfs: 19

Statistics
- Vessel arrivals: 14,092^{(2012)}
- Annual cargo tonnage: 8,339,423^{(2012)}
- Annual container volume: 2,739,558^{(2012)}
- Passenger traffic: 3,728,028^{(2012)}
- Website http://www.zambofreeport.com.ph/

The Port of Zamboanga (Chavacano: Puerto de Zamboanga) and (Cebuano: Pantalan sa Zamboanga) is a seaport located in Zamboanga City, Philippines. It is managed by the Philippine Ports Authority, Port Management Office-Zamboanga, (PPA, PMO-Zamboanga), otherwise known by its corporate name, Zamboanga Freeport Authority (ZFA). The facility ranked second in Asia under the Super Efficient Ports in Asia study carried out in 2010 and published in the African Journal of Business Management (Vol. 5(4), pp. 1397–1407) on February 18, 2011.

== Facilities ==
The Port of Zamboanga is a center for sardine exports to the United States, Europe, the Middle, and Far East. 25 shipping lines operate via the port, serviced by four shipyards operating within the port boundaries and in Zamboanga City.

The port has 19 docks, 12 of which are privately owned. The largest dock has capacity for up to 20 vessels, and is operated directly by the Philippine Ports Authority.

Passenger transport is also a major port industry, with an annual passenger throughput exceeding 5.5 million.

== Statistics ==
Passenger statistics
Year	Total passengers	Disembarking	Embarking
1999	4,577,404	2,381,041	2,196,363
2000	4,924,174	2,575,729	2,348,445
2001	5,244,387	2,643,093	2,601,294
2002	5,570,493	2,834,766	2,735,727
2003	5,531,748	2,857,923	2,673,825
2004	5,665,392	2,962,956	2,702,436
2005	4,374,473	2,218,717	2,155,756
2006	3,208,531	1,604,273	1,604,258
2007	3,221,326	1,603,983	1,617,343
2009	3,546,679	1,754,109	1,792,570
2011	3,742,330	1,862,685	1,879,645
2012	3,728,028	1,854,535	1,873,493
2014	3,940,980	1,959,481	1,981,498
2015	4,220,580	2,104,749	2,115,831
2016	4,439,647	2,210,977	2,228,670
2017	4,831,215	2,389,896	2,441,319

== Incidents and accidents ==
- On October 7, 2025, Weesam Express 8, owned by SRN Fast Seacrafts capsized around 5:20 am while docked at the port. The captain attributed the mishap to damage in the engine room combined with strong waves at the port.

== Gallery ==
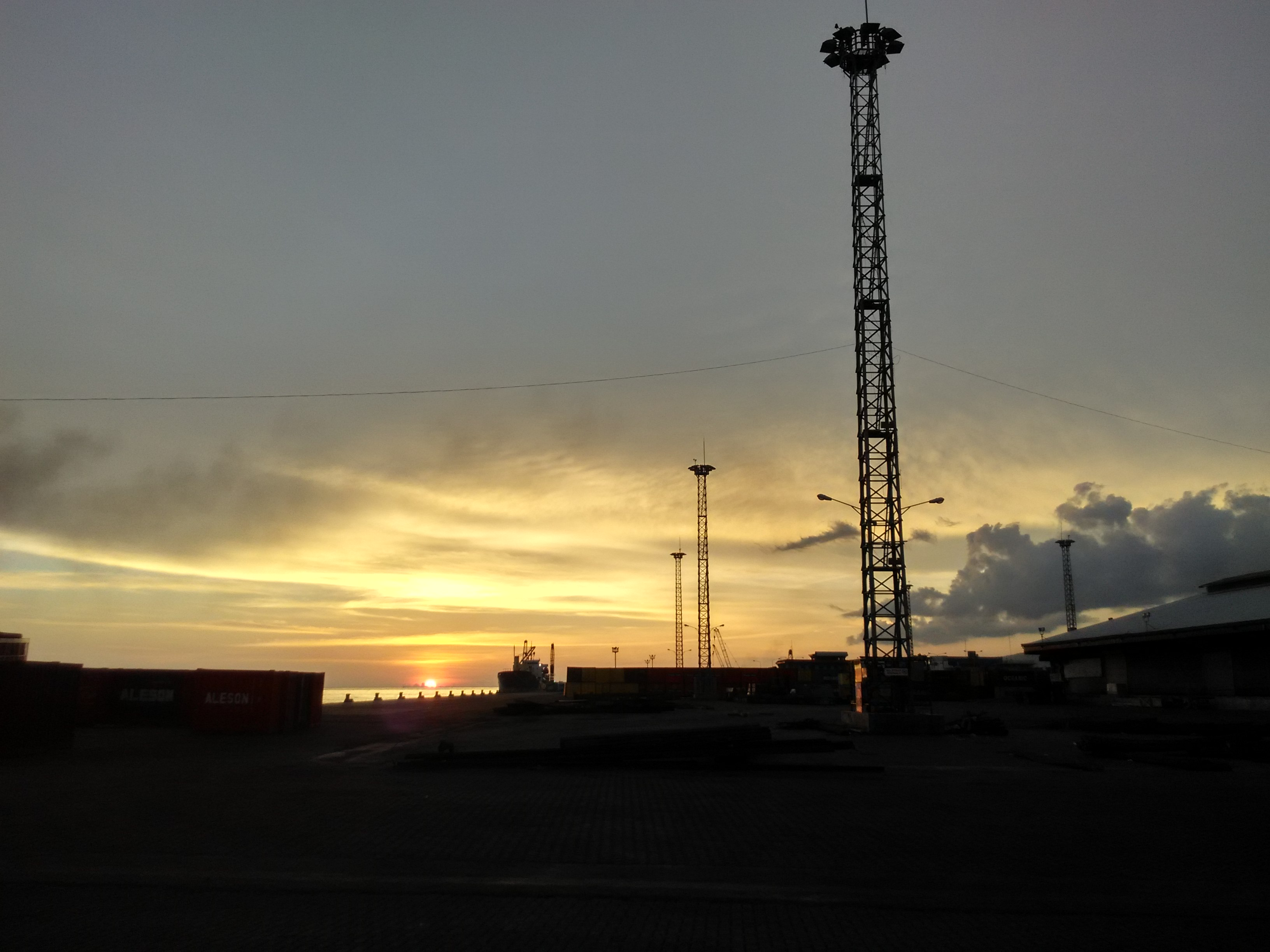
Zamboanga Port at sunset

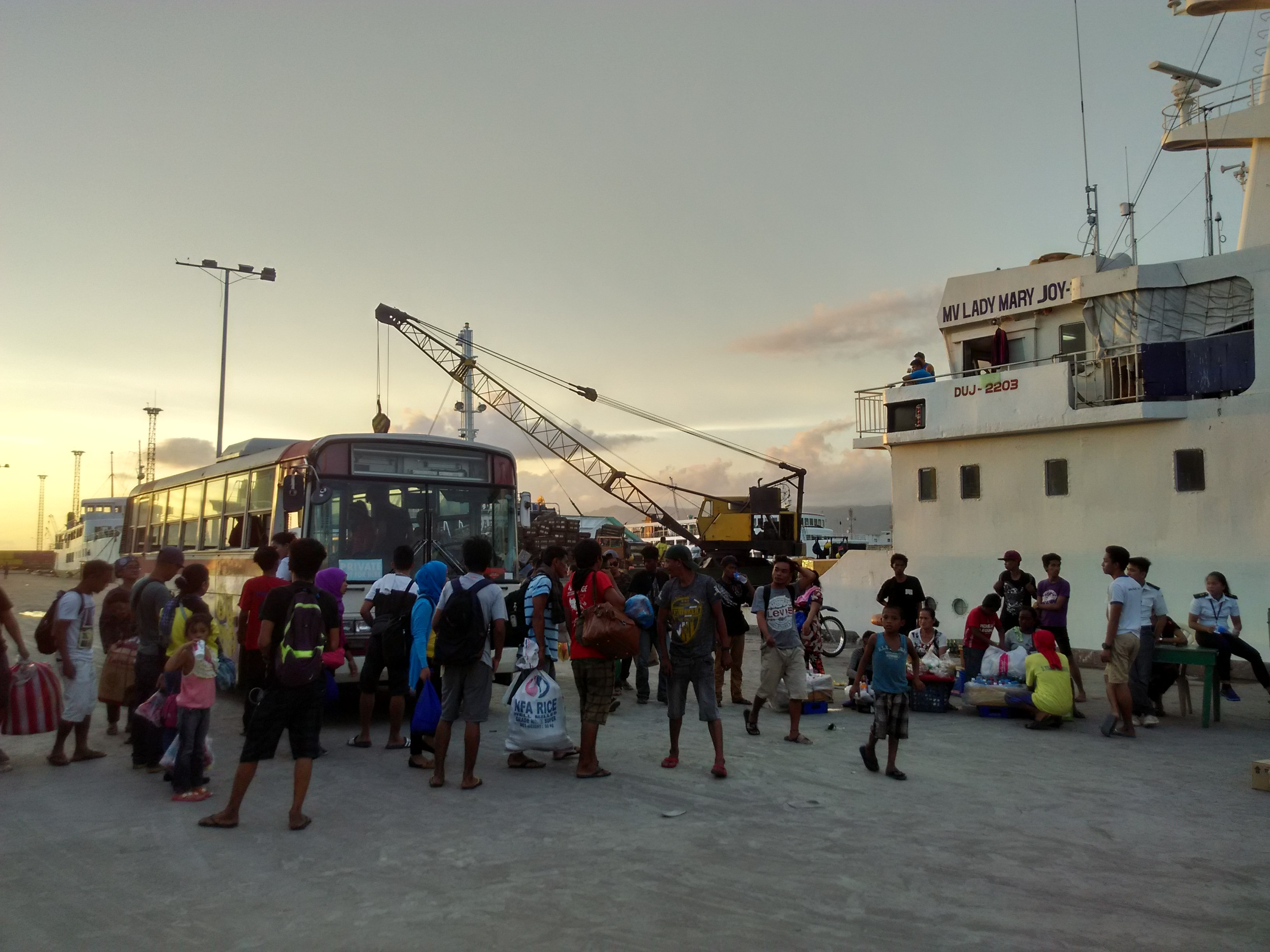
Passengers boarding MV Lady Mary Joy 3

== See also ==
- Port of Davao
