= List of maritime disasters in the Philippines =

This is a list of notable maritime disasters in the Philippines that resulted in at least five deaths. This includes both freshwater and seawater incidents.

== 20th century ==
Maritime Vessel	Shipping line^{1}	Date	Deaths^{1}	Missing^{1}	Survivors^{1}	Remarks							
Maritime Vessel	Shipping line^{1}	Date	Deaths^{1}	Missing^{1}	Survivors^{1}	Remarks	SS Corregidor	Compania Maritima	17 December 1941	900–1,200	Unknown	282	The ferry was sailing to the Visayas and was carrying around 1200-1500 passengers, mostly refugees fleeing the bombing of Manila by the Japanese during the Second World War, when it struck a mine off Corregidor Island and sank in five minutes.
Baby Princess	Unknown	12 June 1970	22	Unknown	22	The fishing boat capsized in a violent storm 300 miles southwest of Manila. The dead were devoured by sharks.							
MV Pilar II	Rio y Compañía	19 August 1959	89	Unknown	Unknown	An overloaded inter-island cargo vessel sank during strong waves off Cabuli Point, El Nido, Palawan.							
Unnamed boat	Unknown	29 August 1976	19	Unknown	Unknown	A boat capsized in the Davao River.							
MV Don Juan	Negros Navigation	22 April 1980	176	115	745	MV Don Juan was a luxury liner bound for Bacolod. At 10:30 p.m. (PST), it collided with an oil tanker, MT Tacloban, off Tablas Strait in Mindoro. 15 minutes later, the vessel sank to a depth of 1,800 feet. The vessel was carrying 1,004 passengers, but it was only cleared to carry 864 persons – including its crew.							
BRP Datu Kalantiaw	Philippine Navy	21 September 1981	79	0	18	The Cannon-class destroyer escort and flagship of the Navy ran aground off the coast of Calayan, Cagayan during Typhoon Rubing (Clara).							
Coral Island	Unknown	25 July 1982	21	unknown	74	The tourist ship caught fire off Manila Bay after an engine exploded on a trial run. The ship was only carrying crew members at the time.							
MV Doña Cassandra	Gothong Shipping Lines	21 November 1983	167	Unknown	Unknown	Capsized off the coast of Surigao del Norte after being battered by strong gusts caused by Typhoon Warling (Orchid). Historically notable for the death of the Cassandra Martyrs of Charity.							
MV Doña Josefina	Unknown	24 April 1986	34	130+	260	The inter-island ferry sank off the coast of Isabel, Leyte on its way from Cebu to Manila.							
MV Doña Paz	Sulpicio Lines	20 December 1987	4,341^{2}	Unknown^{2}	25	MV Doña Paz left from Tacloban City, Leyte, for the City of Manila, with a stopover at Catbalogan, Samar. At 10:30 p.m. (PST), the passenger vessel collided with a motor tanker, MT Vector, near Dumali Point between the provinces of Marinduque and Oriental Mindoro. The vessel's manifest only listed 1,493 passengers and a 53-member crew, but survivors claimed that the vessel was carrying more than 4,000 passengers. The incident was the worst peacetime disaster and the worst in the 20th century, and the vessel was even named the Asia's Titanic.							
MT Vector	Vector Shipping	20 December 1987	11	0	2								
MV Doña Marilyn	Sulpicio Lines	24 October 1988	389	2	197	While sailing from Manila to Tacloban City, the vessel was caught up in Typhoon Unsang and sank. It was the sister ship of MV Doña Paz.							
MB Jem II	Unknown	3 January 1989	16	45	113	The 31-passenger capacity motor boat left Looc, Romblon and for Malay, Aklan with 174 passengers on board, mostly students. The overloaded boat sank off of Aguho Point, Tablas Island in strong waves.							
Bocaue Pagoda tragedy	Unknown	2 July 1993	226-279	Unknown	Unknown	The pagoda, that was used for the Bocaue River Festival in Bocaue, Bulacan was estimated to carrying 800 to 1000 devotees. At 8:15 p.m, the pagoda sank in the middle of the Bocaue River. According to witnesses many of the passengers moved to one side of the barge after a firecracker flew towards it. The concentrated weight of the people on board tilted the barge, causing the structure to collapse and sink. It is believed that some of the fatalities were electrocuted from the equipment on board.							
Unnamed boat	Unknown	24 October 1993	11	1	5	A boat travelling from Talim Island in Laguna de Bay to mainland Cardona, Rizal capsized after the wake of a passing motorboat panicked passengers who had moved to one side of the vessel.							
MV Cebu City	William Lines	2 December 1994	73	41	525	Collided with Singaporean container vessel, MV Kota Suria, off Manila Bay. The container ship only had a dent in its bow. Sister ship to MV Don Juan.							
MV Kota Suria	(Singapore) Pacific Int’l Line Ltd.	2 December 1994	0	0	Unknown	Collided with Singaporean container vessel, MV Kota Suria, off Manila Bay. The container ship only had a dent in its bow. Sister ship to MV Don Juan.							
MV Viva Antipolo VII	Viva Shipping Inc.	16 May 1995	62	10	142	Caught fire and sank within the vicinity of Dalahican Fish Port, Lucena.							
MV Kimelody Cristy	Moreta Shipping Lines	13 December 1995	24	13	100	At 2:00 a.m. (PST), caught fire and sank off Fortune Island, Nasugbu, Batangas.							
ML Gretchen I	Noe and Clarita Quiamco	18 February 1996	51	Unknown	145	Sank after being battered by strong winds near Cadiz, Negros Occidental. The old wooden ferry, according to the investigation, was not seaworthy and was carrying more than its allowed capacity. It was also eight hours late to dock in the Port of Cadiz. The Philippine Coast Guard failed to respond to the incident since the ferry had no radio on board.							
MV Kalibo Star	K&T Shipping Company	15 August 1997	12	32	88	An inter-island ferry travelling during strong waves from Cebu to Tacloban capsized between Maripipi and Kawayan, Biliran.							
MB King Roger	Landmark Travel Agency	15 August 1997	8	0	35	A double-decker sightseeing vessel carrying foreign tourists which sank during stormy weather 400 meters from the marina of the Manila Yacht Club in Manila Bay. Authorities blamed overloading for the disaster, which killed seven Hong Kong nationals and one Japanese.							
MV Princess of the Orient	Sulpicio Lines	18 September 1998	70	80	355	The 13,935-ton, 195-metre (640 ft) long vessel sailed from Manila to Cebu during a typhoon and capsized at 12:55 p.m. (PST) near Fortune Island in Batangas.							
Lumban float sinking	Unknown	19 January 1999	13	Unknown	Unknown	During a fluvial procession in Lumban, Laguna, a float hit an electric cable which later fell, causing devotees aboard to get either electrocuted or drowned as they jumped into the river.							
MV Asia South Korea	Trans-Asia Shipping Lines	23 December 1999	58	0	699	The vessel was en route to Iloilo City from Cebu City when it hit rock formations off Bantayan Island. The collision created a hole in its hull causing its sinking.							

== 21st century ==
Maritime Vessel	Shipping line^{1}	Date	Deaths^{1}	Missing^{1}	Survivors^{1}	Remarks							
Maritime Vessel	Shipping line^{1}	Date	Deaths^{1}	Missing^{1}	Survivors^{1}	Remarks	M/V Our Lady of Mediatrix	Unknown	25 February 2000	41	0	100+	A large incendiary bomb believed to have been planted by Moro separatists exploded aboard three buses on the ferry. as it crossed Panguil Bay to Ozamiz. The vessel did not sink and later returned to service following repairs.
ML Annahada	Unknown	12 April 2000	69	100+	Unknown	The unlicensed, overloaded wooden ferryboat heading for Tawi-Tawi and Malaysia capsized at sea after leaving the port of Jolo, Sulu.							
MV Maria Carmela	Montenegro Shipping Lines	11 April 2002	39	6	371	Fire broke out in the cargo hold of the vessel around 7:30 a.m. (PST). The vessel burned for three days until it sank in Pagbilao Island, Quezon.							
MV San Nicolas	San Nicholas Shipping Lines	25 May 2003	43	21	182	The collision happened at 11:45 a.m. (PST) near Limobones Point, Corregidor. MV San Nicholas was heading for Manila, while Superferry 12 was sailing for Cebu.							
MV SuperFerry 12	WG&A	25 May 2003	0	0	1,700	The ferry suffered minor damage, was repaired and returned into service. However, it later caught fire at Cebu in March 2006. but was repaired and continued in service until 2021.							
MV SuperFerry 14	WG&A	27 February 2004	94	24	781	The ferry sailed out of Manila for Cagayan de Oro via Bacolod and Iloilo City with 899 recorded passengers and crew aboard. An hour after its 11 p.m. sailing, just off Corregidor Island, a television set containing a 3.6-kilogram (8-pound) TNT bomb had been placed on board in the lower, more crowded decks by a member of the Abu Sayyaf Group detonated. The explosion tore through the vessel, starting a fire that engulfed the ship, which eventually sank. It was the Philippines' deadliest terrorist attack and the world's deadliest terrorist attack at sea.							
MV Princess of the Stars	Sulpicio Lines	21 June 2008	437	605	32	MV Princess of the Stars capsized off the coast of San Fernando, Romblon at the height of Typhoon Frank. The ferry left Manila en route to Cebu City and was permitted to sail because the vessel was large enough to stay afloat in the typhoon's periphery. However, Frank unexpectedly changed course, placing the ferry closer to the storm. According to survivors the ship ran into rough seas and capsized off the coast of Romblon.							
MB Don Dexter	Unknown	4 November 2008	42	10	105	Motor banca capsized near Macaraguit Island, Dimasalang, Masbate after its outrigger broke.							
MB Maejan	Unknown	14 December 2008	47	30	45	Motor banca capsized near the vicinity of Aparri, Cagayan after its outrigger broke. The boat was carrying passengers in excess of its allowed capacity from Calayan Island to Aparri, and bad weather conditions contributed to its capsizing.							
SuperFerry 9	Aboitiz Transport System (ATS)	6 September 2009	10	0	961	Inter-island ferry sank off the coast of the Zamboanga Peninsula.							
MV Catalyn B	San Nicolas Shipping Lines	24 December 2009	25	2	46	Wooden-hulled passenger vessel MV Catalyn B collided with FV Anatalia off the coast of Limbones Island in Maragondon, Cavite. The vessel was traveling from Manila to Tilik Port in Lubang, Occidental Mindoro when FV Anatalia crossed its path, causing it to collide with the fishing vessel and sink.							
FV Anatalia	Unknown	24 December 2009	0	0	All crew survived	The steel-hulled fishing vessel FV Anatalia was on its way back to the Navotas Fish Port Complex after a fishing expedition in the Turtle Islands, Tawi-Tawi and was entering Manila Bay when MV Catalyn B collided with the vessel's rear. Anatalia was damaged in the rear but remained afloat.							
MV Baleno 9	Besta Shipping Lines	26 December 2009	6	54	72	The RORO vessel capsized in the vicinity of Verde Island, Batangas while it was en route from Calapan, Oriental Mindoro to Batangas City.							
MV St. Thomas Aquinas	2GO Travel	16 August 2013	114	23	750	MV St. Thomas Aquinas departed from Nasipit, Agusan del Norte heading for Cebu City. At approximately 9:00 p.m. (PST), it was approaching its destination via the Cebu Strait when it collided with MV Sulpicio Express Siete, a cargo ship owned by the Philippine Span Asia Carrier Corporation that was leaving port, approximately 1.2 miles (1.9 km) from Talisay, Cebu. The vessel immediately began to take on water, prompting the captain to order the ship abandoned. The crew hurriedly handed out life jackets as hundreds of passengers jumped overboard. Within 30 minutes, the ship had sunk. At the time of the collision, St. Thomas Aquinas was carrying 715 passengers (58 were infants) and 116 crew members. Many passengers were asleep at the time or otherwise had trouble finding their way to the deck in the dark.							
MV Sulpicio Express Siete	Philippine Span Asia Carrier Corporation	16 August 2013	0	0	36	Did not sink.							
MB Kim Nirvana-B	Unknown	2 July 2015	62	0	158	The sinking occurred en route from Ormoc to Pilar, Cebu in Ponson Island, among the Camotes Islands. According to initial reports, the motor banca capsized due to overload with passengers and cargo and that the boat took a sharp turn. The Maritime Industry Authority (MARINA) later stated that the boat capsized not because of overloading, but "the negligent operations of the captain". Authorities placed the final count of death toll to 62, while 158 survived.							
MB Chi-chi	Unknown	3 August 2019	11	1	37	Capsized due to squalls between Iloilo Strait and Guimaras Strait intensified by tropical monsoon winds and rains. The Chi-Chi and Keziah collided and capsized after they were hit by a squall, while the third Jenny Vince figured in a separate accident and also capsized.							
MB Jenny Vince	Unknown	3 August 2019	20	2	22	Capsized due to squalls between Iloilo Strait and Guimaras Strait intensified by tropical monsoon winds and rains. The Chi-Chi and Keziah collided and capsized after they were hit by a squall, while the third Jenny Vince figured in a separate accident and also capsized.							
MB Keziah 2	Unknown	3 August 2019	0	0	5	Capsized due to squalls between Iloilo Strait and Guimaras Strait intensified by tropical monsoon winds and rains. The Chi-Chi and Keziah collided and capsized after they were hit by a squall, while the third Jenny Vince figured in a separate accident and also capsized.							
FV Liberty 5	Irma Fishing and Trading Inc.	27 June 2020	14	0	0	The fishing vessel was on its way to the Navotas Fish Port in Metro Manila from a fishing expedition in Mapun, Tawi-Tawi when it collided with the Hong Kong-flagged bulk carrier MV Vienna Wood N in the vicinity of Mamburao, Occidental Mindoro. Inclement weather may have contributed to the collision of the two vessels. None of the 14 individuals on board the fishing vessel were found.							
MV Vienna Wood N	(Hong Kong) A. M. Nomikos Transworld Maritime Agencies	27 June 2020	0	0	20	The Hong Kong-flagged bulk carrier MV Vienna Wood N was on its way to Australia from Subic Bay Freeport when it collided with the fishing vessel Liberty 5 in the vicinity of Mamburao, Occidental Mindoro. A hold departure order was given to the 20 crew of the bulk carrier by a court in Mamburao while the Philippine Coast Guard filed criminal charges against crew and owners of the vessel. The charges were dismissed by prosecutors after the owners of the fishing vessel and the owners of the bulk carrier reached a settlement worth PH₱ 40 million. The vessel was allowed to leave the Philippines on 17 September 2020.							
MV Mercraft 2	Mercraft Shipping	23 May 2022	9	0	148	The ferry left Polillo Island at 5 a.m. and caught fire, allegedly starting from the engine room, at approximately 1,000 yards from the Port of Real. The vessel was then towed to Baluti Island in Real, Quezon.							
MV Lady Mary Joy 3	Aleson Shipping Lines	29 March 2023	33	0	216	The ferry was en route to Jolo, Sulu from Zamboanga City when it caught fire off Hadji Muhtamad, Basilan. Eighteen of the dead were found inside the ship after it was towed to shore							
MB Aya Express	Unknown	27 July 2023	26	0	40	Overloaded motor banca capsized en route to Talim Island from Binangonan, Rizal when it was hit by strong winds 45 meters from the shores of Laguna de Bay, causing the passengers to panic and move to the left side.							
FBCA King Bryan	Unknown	5 June 2024	6	0	6	Fishing boat travelling from Masbate caught fire off the coast of Naga, Cebu, which was believed to have originated from its engine.							
MV Hong Hai 16	Keen Peak Corporation	15 April 2025	9	2	14	Capsized while conducting dredging operations off the coast of Rizal, Occidental Mindoro.							
MBCA Amejara	Unknown	19 January 2026	7	7	1	A recreational boat that capsized in Davao Gulf off Davao Occidental, while on its way to Governor Generoso, Davao Oriental from Davao City.							
MV Trisha Kerstin 3	Aleson Shipping Lines	26 January 2026	65	14-20	293	Sank off Baluk-Baluk Island in Hadji Muhtamad, Basilan while en route from Zamboanga City to Jolo, Sulu.							
MV June Aster	Atienza Interisland Ferries	9 September 2026	77	8	43	Caught fire 1.2 nautical miles from Coron, Palawan while en route from Manila.							

1. ^{a} ^{b} ^{c} ^{d} Data are based from the records of the Board of Marine Inquiry of the Philippine Coast Guard, unless taken and supported from other references.
2. ^{a} ^{b} The death toll of 4,341 was only an estimate, which also includes the missing.

== See also ==
- List of maritime disasters involving the Philippine Span Asia Carrier Corporation
- List of maritime disasters
- List of disasters in the Philippines
- List of man-made disasters in the Philippines
