= MV Princess of the Stars =

Philippine passenger ferry capsized in 2008

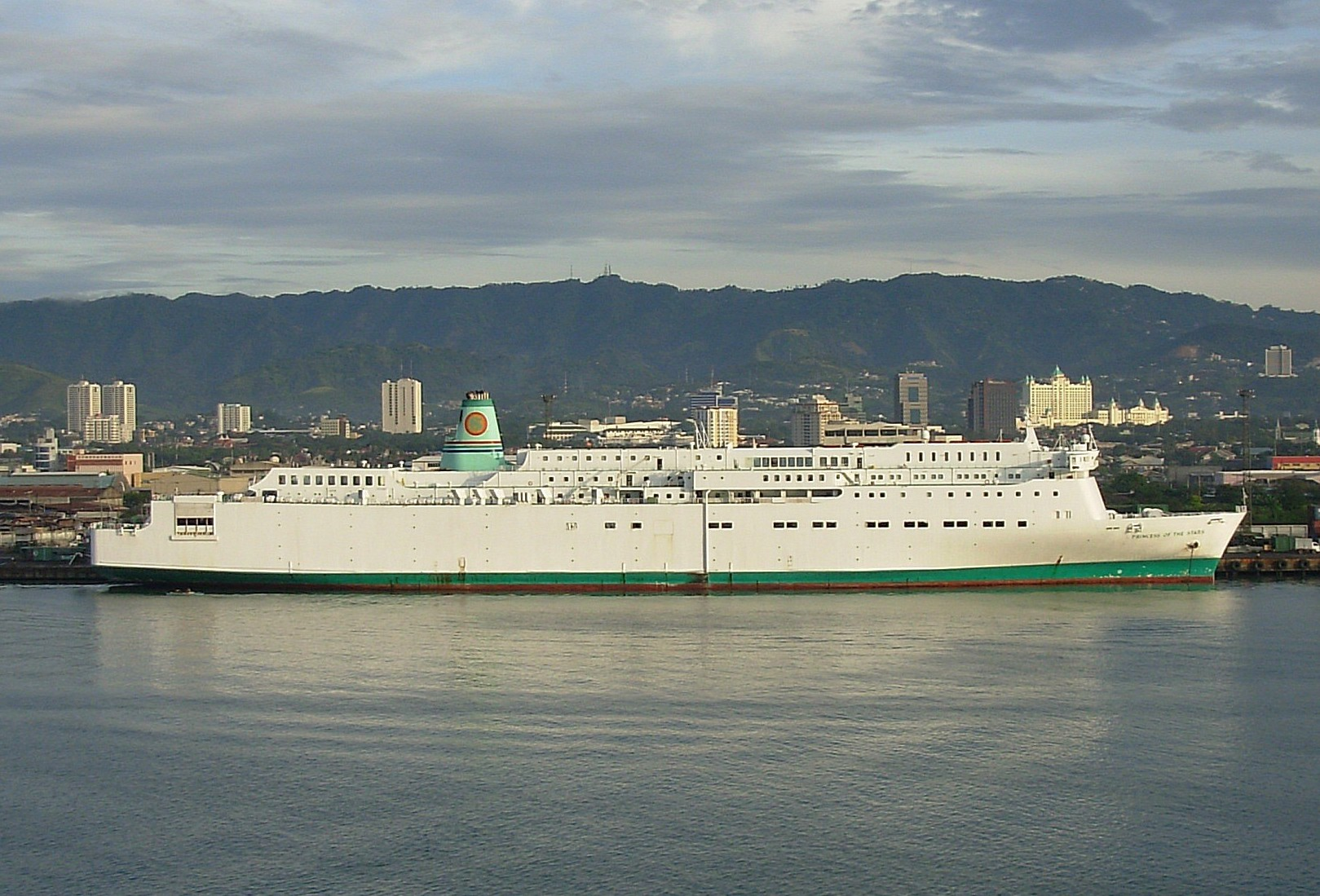
- The MV Princess of the Stars docked at the Port of Cebu

History

Japan
- Name: Ferry Lilac
- Owner: Shin Nihonkai Ferry
- Operator: Shin Nihonkai Ferry
- Port of registry: Otaru, Japan
- Route: Maizuru – Otaru
- Builder: IHI Corporation, Aioi, Hyōgo, Japan
- Yard number: 2904
- Laid down: 3 February 1984
- Launched: 27 March 1984
- Maiden voyage: 10 July 1984
- In service: 1984–2004
- Out of service: July 2004
- Identification: Call sign: 7LHR; IMO number: 8323161
- Fate: Sold to Sulpicio Lines

Philippines
- Name: MV Princess of the Stars
- Owner: Sulpicio Lines
- Operator: Sulpicio Lines
- Port of registry: Cebu City, Philippines
- Route: Manila – Cebu City (2008)
- Maiden voyage: 2004
- In service: 2004–2008
- Out of service: June 21, 2008
- Fate: Capsized during Typhoon Fengshen on June 21, 2008; salvaged and scrapped in 2011

General characteristics
- Class & type: ROPAX Ferry
- Tonnage: 18,268 GT (1984–1990); 19,105 GT (1990–2004); 23,824 GT (2004–2008)
- Length: 193 m (633 ft 2 in)
- Beam: 28 m (91 ft 10 in)
- Height: 43 m (141 ft 1 in)
- Draft: 6 m (19 ft 8 in)
- Depth: 14 m (45 ft 11 in)
- Decks: 8
- Installed power: SEMT Pielstick 8PC4-2L (dual engines)
- Propulsion: 4×4 Controllable Pitch Propellers (dual propellers)
- Speed: 21.8 knots (40.37 km/h)
- Capacity: 1984–1990: 554 passengers; 152 trailers; 1990–2004: 586 passengers; 186 trailers; 136 vehicles; 2004–2008: 1,992 Passengers; 160 trailers
- Crew: 54

MV Princess of the Stars was a passenger ferry owned by Filipino shipping company Sulpicio Lines, that capsized and sank on June 21, 2008, off the coast of San Fernando, Romblon at the height of Typhoon Fengshen, which was locally named by PAGASA as Frank. The storm passed directly over Romblon as a Category 2 typhoon, leading to the capsizing of the vessel; 814 people died as a result of the disaster.

== Background ==
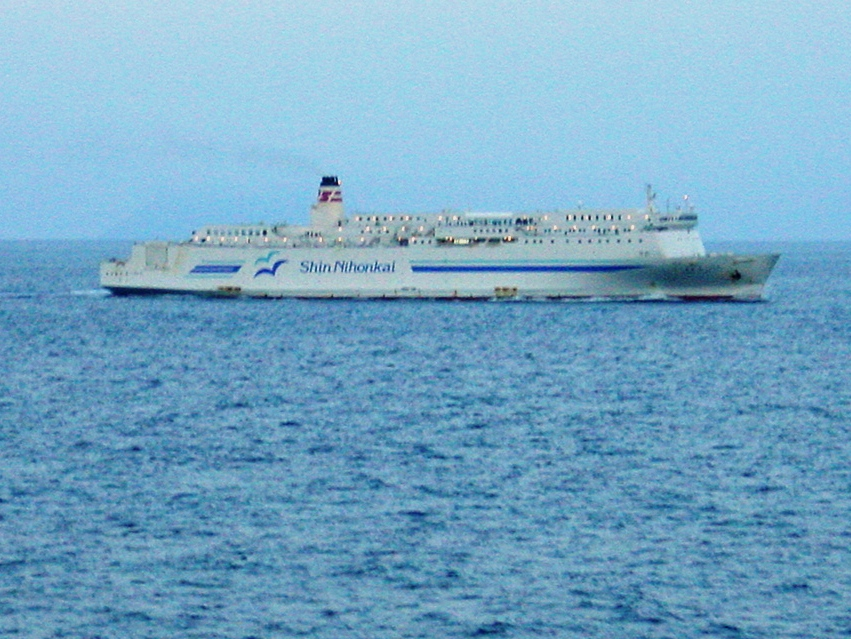
The Ferry Lilac while in service in Japan

MV Princess of the Stars was built in 1984 by Ishikawajima-Harima Heavy Industries Co., Ltd., in Aioi, Hyōgo, Japan, as Ferry Lilac (Japanese: フェリーらいらっく) of Shin Nihonkai Ferry (Japanese: 新日本海フェリー株式会社). She is the second ship bearing "Lilac" in her name. The original "Ferry Lilac" entered service in the 1970s, the third-generation ferry named "Lilac", entered service in 2002. When she entered service, she became the largest Ropax ferry in Japan, although she was not designed to be as fast as her predecessors.

She began her maiden voyage on July 10, 1984. She was assigned the Maizuru – Otaru route via the Sea of Japan. She had an initial passenger capacity of 554 people. She measured 193 meters long, and had a width of 29 meters. She had a gross tonnage of 23,824. Being a large ROPAX ferry, she could carry cars and trucks, and was designed to survive rough seas.

She was refitted by Shin Nihonkai Ferry in February 1990 in a major overhaul aimed at replicating her facilities with those of her successors. The common areas were enlarged and modernized, corridors with sea views were added, as well as 23 new 1st class cabins, a solarium and an outdoor swimming pool at the rear. Her capacity was increased.

In July of 2004, she was retired after 20 years of service in Japan. She was sold to Sulpicio Lines, where she served as the company's new flagship, displacing the MV Princess of the Universe, ex-New Yamato. She was assigned to the premier Manila – Cebu route, a route used by the flagships of rival companies, and a route where the competition among the shipping companies at that time was intense. She was again refitted with an additional lower passenger deck. A cargo ramp was installed on the stern port side. As a result of her refitting, her capacity was significantly increased up to 1,992 passengers. This was lower compared to Sulpicio Lines' previous generation of ferries, such as MV Princess of the Orient, which had a capacity of more than 3,000 people at the time of her own sinking.

Upon entry to service with Sulpicio Lines, the 193 m (633 ft) vessel became the largest passenger ferry ever to set sail in the Philippines. Her size caught the attention of the public, the passengers and the crew, even from rival companies, due to her size compared with other ferries at that time. Her size record remained unchallenged for several years until the arrival of two 195 m (640 ft) long sister ships, named the MV 2GO Maligaya (ex-Yamato/Stena Nova) and MV 2GO Masagana (ex-Tsukushi) of 2GO in 2021. While in service with Sulpicio Lines, she had 4 years of uneventful voyages until June 2008.

== Disaster ==
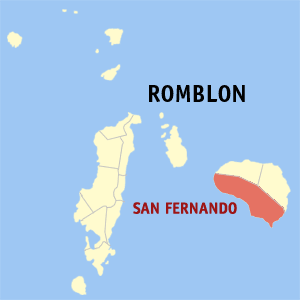
The location of San Fernando within the province of Romblon

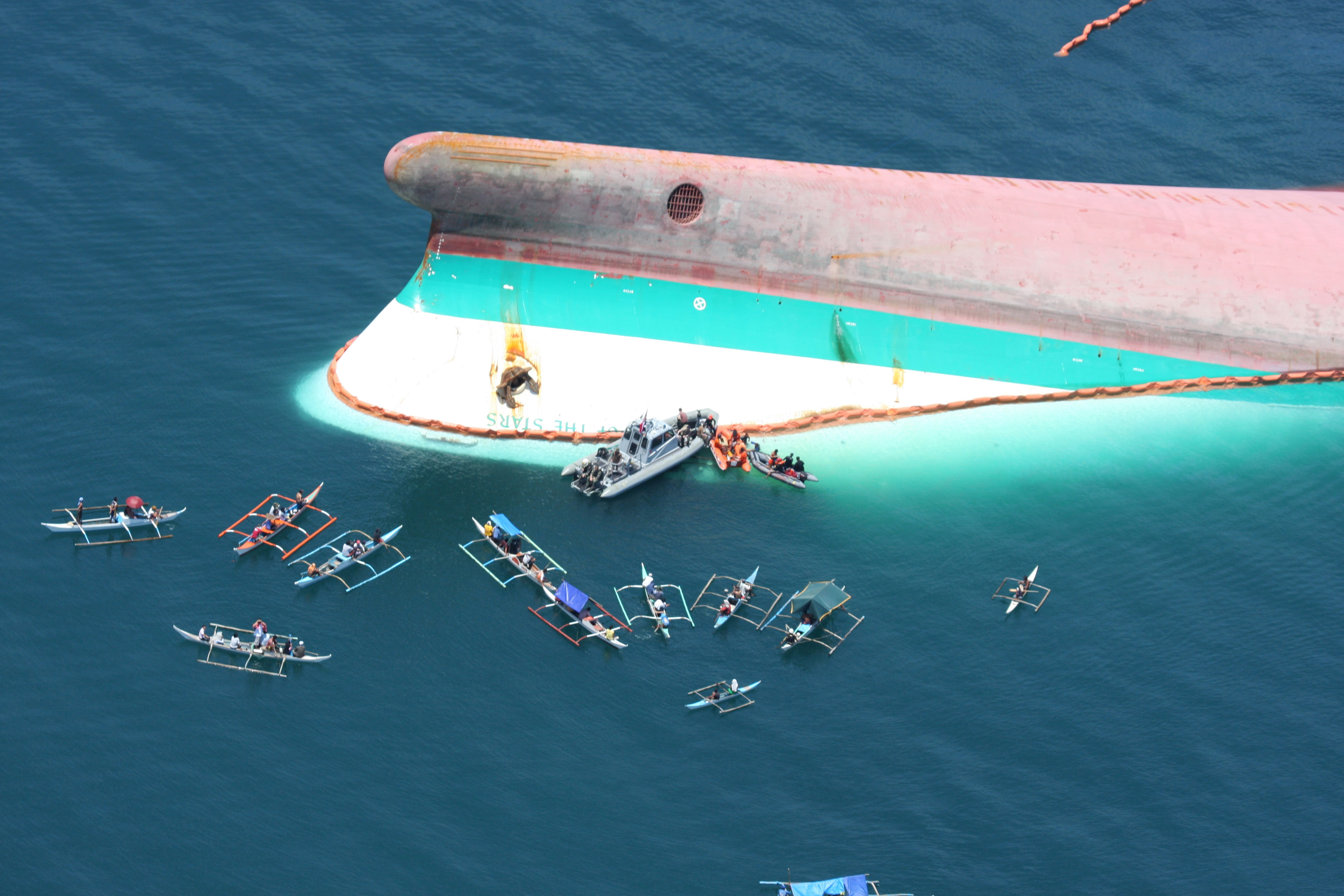
Recovery operations on June 25, 2008

The Princess of the Stars left the port of Manila on June 20, 2008, en route to Cebu City. Although Typhoon Fengshen, locally known as Typhoon Frank, had made landfall at Samar Island earlier the same day, Princess of the Stars was permitted to sail because the vessel was large enough to stay afloat in the typhoon's periphery. However, Fengshen unexpectedly changed course later that day, placing the ferry in serious danger of being overwhelmed by the storm.

At midday on June 21, the ferry sent out a distress signal; radio contact was lost at 12:30 PST (04:30 GMT). The mayor of San Fernando, Nanette Tansingco, sent a speedboat and confirmed that the ferry had a hole in the hull and was partially submerged, and that several bodies had been found nearby. Later reports revealed that the hole in the hull was actually the ship's bow thruster.

The location of the storm and Princess of the Stars when the ship lost radio contact at 11 am June 21, 2008

The total number of people aboard was initially reported as 747 – 626 passengers and 121 crew (575 adults, 20 children, 31 infants and 121 officers and crew members). However, Sulpicio Lines announced that there had been 755 manifested passengers and 111 crew members, making a total of 866. It is possible that there were more passengers not recorded in the manifest.

According to the last made official figures (final toll) there were 814 dead and missing and 56 known survivors, making a grand total of 870 people on board.

According to an account given by four survivors, who managed to swim to nearby Sibuyan Island, Princess of the Stars had not malfunctioned (as had been previously reported), but ran into rough seas off the coast of Romblon. At 11:30 am, passengers were told to put on life jackets, and fifteen minutes later, the captain gave the order to abandon ship. The ship began to tilt around midday. The survivors witnessed many people jumping into the water, while some made it onto life rafts. Many of them were not wearing life jackets, and according to the four survivors, the crew were more concerned with saving themselves than with assisting the passengers. The ferry capsized at 1 pm.

After the Navy vessel closest to the area had to abort its rescue mission due to "gigantic waves, pounding rain, and gusty winds", according to the spokesman of the Philippine Navy, another rescue ship reached Princess of the Stars more than 24 hours after it lost radio contact. Philippine Coast Guard spokesman Arman Balilo said: "They haven't seen anyone. They're scouring the area. They're studying the direction of the waves to determine where survivors may have drifted."

By June 23, four bodies had been recovered from the scene by the Coast Guard and the Philippine Navy. Another 35 corpses and 40 survivors washed ashore at Burias Island, Masbate, the same day. It is likely that the bodies came not only from the Princess of the Stars but also from other vessels that capsized in the typhoon. Some of the 40 survivors said they came from MV Lake Paway, which departed from Mindanao but later sank at sea.

The Philippine Coast Guard reported on June 24, 2008, that it accounted for 115 (48 survivors, 67 confirmed dead, 747 missing) of the 862 passengers and crew of Princess of the Stars. Navy divers found no survivors inside the wreck when they entered the upturned hulk of the ferry. They found 15 bodies inside the ship's dining area and two others in the bridge. It was so dark inside the ferry that it was impossible to tell how many more corpses were inside. A helicopter from a U.S. military ship, the USNS Stockham, found 12 bodies floating near Masbate island, but it was not clear if they were from the Princess of the Stars.

The victims' families accused Sulpicio Lines and the Philippine Coast Guard of negligence in allowing the ship to get underway despite the bad weather. They further blamed Sulpicio for not personally informing them about the tragedy, the details of the accident, and the condition of the ship and passengers. Sulpicio Lines' counsel stated that the ship was never advised by the Coast Guard that it was not safe to sail.

President Gloria Macapagal Arroyo demanded an explanation from port authorities: "Why did you allow it to sail and why was there no ample warning? I want answers." The Maritime Industry Authority (Marina) ordered the grounding of all Sulpicio Lines vessels, pending an investigation. Vice President Noli de Castro presided over the first meeting of the newly created "Task Force Princess Stars". Sulpicio Lines offered to pay the bereaved families 200,000 pesos ($4,500) each, by way of compensation.

=== Dangerous cargo removal ===
On June 27, 2008, recovery efforts ceased due to the discovery that 10,000 kilos of the dangerous pesticide endosulfan were on board. The shipment was contracted by Del Monte Philippines Inc. and was supposed to have been loaded onto another Sulpicio vessel, the MV Princess of Paradise. The Philippine government announced that they were considering filing charges, as it is illegal to transport dangerous goods aboard passenger vessels in the country.

Titan Salvage was contracted by the owners to remove the endosulfan, along with some additional dangerous cargo in a second container. Both cargos were located in containers in the "D" deck of the capsized vessel. Titan Salvage assembled a salvage team consisting of the following companies: Harbor Star, a Philippine tug and salvage company; Global Diving & Salvage, a U.S. based diving company specializing in hazardous diving operations; and South Pacific Environmental, a Guam-based company specializing in hazardous chemical mitigation. The salvage team began the endosulfan recovery operations on September 24, 2008.

By October 5, all 402 of the 25 kg drums had been safely recovered from the first 40 ft container located near the aft end of "D" deck, in about 85 ft of water. The salvage team then removed the other dangerous cargo from a 20 ft container located toward the center of "D" deck in about 35 ft of water. On October 11, it was determined that all of the dangerous cargo located in the second container had been safely recovered. The salvage team drilled into the ship's hull to remove the ship's fuel. This phase was completed by October 17. Approximately 200,000 liters were recovered.

=== Continuation of body recovery efforts ===
Once the dangerous cargos were removed, the body recovery effort continued. From October 27 until November 10, divers from Harbor Star and the Coast Guard recovered 199 bodies from "C", "B" and "A" decks. PCG commandant Vice Adm. Wilfredo Tamayo stated: "We are not expecting to see 500 bodies. We would be lucky to get half of that." Divers, however, failed to enter the engine room, and some other areas, due to inaccessibility and danger. The bodies were stored on MV Tacloban Princess. Forensic doctors from the National Bureau of Investigation (NBI) and Interpol were waiting in Cebu City to attempt identification.

The NBI's Doctor Bautista said, thereafter, that DNA matching, assisted and funded by Interpol, would be done in the International Commission on Missing Persons laboratory in Sarajevo, Bosnia. Most of the initial bodies recovered had detached limbs or heads and disintegrated flesh, after more than four months underwater. The Philippine Coast Guard reported that only 56 people were known to have survived the maritime tragedy. Around 350 bodies had been recovered, with the remainder presumed to be trapped inside the capsized vessel.

By May 2010, the wreck had been longitudinally cut in half and towed to shallower waters, where divers could more safely search the interior. A further 47 sets of human remains were recovered, and turned over to the National Bureau of Investigation and the Public Attorney's Office for forensic testing.

== Investigation ==
=== BMI final report ===
The five-member Philippines Board of Marine Inquiry, in its 65-page report dated August 25, 2008, submitted to the Maritime Industry Authority or Marina, found Sulpicio Lines and its captain liable for the tragedy. The BMI recommended that Marina "consider the suspension of the Certificate of Public Convenience (CPC) of Sulpicio Lines in accordance with existing laws, rules and regulations (and its criminal liability for the sinking)." The final report blamed human error, and ruled that the ship's missing and presumed dead captain, Florencio Marimon, "miscalculated" the risk of continuing the trip to Cebu despite the stormy weather.

According to the report: "The immediate cause of the capsizing of MV Princess of the Stars was the failure of the Master to exercise extraordinary diligence and good seamanship thereby committing an error of judgment that brought MV Princess of the Stars in harm's way into the eye of Typhoon Frank ... The shipping firm is found negligent for its failure to exercise its duty in ensuring that they transport passengers and cargo safely to (their) destination." Sulpicio Lines subsequently announced their intention to appeal the decision.

Sulpicio Lines, the second-largest cargo carrier in the Philippines, accounts for 40% of all cargo movement across the country. Some commentators – such as Robert Go, former president of the Cebu Chamber of Commerce and Industry – argued that suspending Sulpicio's activities would cause significant disruption to the country's economy over the Christmas season.

=== Judgment ===
The Court of Appeals, in a 237-page landmark decision dated June 28, 2024, written by Justice Wilhelmina Jorge-Wagan, held that Philippine Span Asia Carrier Corporation formerly Sulpicio Lines, Inc. was guilty of gross negligence and consequently liable for the deaths of 814 passengers and 500 missing in the MV Princess of the Stars' shipwreck. In upholding the Manila Regional Trial Court Branch 49's judgment, the CA ordered PSACC owners Enrique Go, Eusebio Go, Carlos Go, Victoriano Go, Dominador Go, Ricardo Go, Edward Go and Edgar Go, to pay a total of P129,854,502.57 damages to the victims' heirs, survivors, families and relatives, represented by counsel Persida Acosta.

== International response ==
=== United States ===
The United States donated US$100,000 (equivalent to $149,536 in 2025) for the victims through the Philippine Red Cross, and sent the USNS GYSGT Fred W. Stockham and a P-3 Orion maritime surveillance aircraft to contribute to the rescue. During a one-on-one meeting between U.S. President George W. Bush and Philippine President Gloria Macapagal-Aroyo, the United States extended its condolences to the people of the Philippines and pledged that more assistance would be given, including the deployment of the U.S. Naval carrier group USS Ronald Reagan to assist in any rescue or retrieval operations.

== See also ==
- List of maritime disasters involving the Philippine Span Asia Carrier Corporation
- List of maritime disasters in the Philippines
- List of shipwrecks in 2008
- 2008 Pacific typhoon season
- MV Doña Paz sank in 1987 with at least 4,341 people killed.
- MV Doña Marilyn sank in 1988 with 254 dead.
- MV St. Thomas Aquinas sank in 2013 after a collision with a cargo ship MV Sulpicio Express Siete with 137 people killed and missing.
- SS El Faro sank in 2015 during Hurricane Joaquin
