= List of maritime disasters involving the Philippine Span Asia Carrier Corporation =

The Philippine Span Asia Carrier Corporation (PSACC) formerly named Sulpicio Lines currently holds the world record for the worst peacetime maritime disaster due to the sinking MV Doña Paz which is said to have claimed more than 4,000 lives in the Philippines.

== Notable disasters ==
Notable maritime disasters
Vessel	Date	Deaths	Missing	Survivors	Remarks						
Vessel	Date	Deaths	Missing	Survivors	Remarks	MV Doña Paz	20 December 1987	4,341^{2}	Unknown^{2}	25	Further information: MV Doña Paz MV Doña Paz left from Tacloban City, Leyte, for the City of Manila, with a stopover at Catbalogan, Samar. At 10:30 p.m. (PST), the passenger vessel collided with a motor tanker, MT Vector, near Dumali Point between the provinces of Marinduque and Oriental Mindoro. The vessel's manifest only listed 1,493 passengers and a 53-member crew, but survivors claimed that the vessel was carrying more than 4,000 passengers. The incident was the worst peacetime disaster and the worst in the 20th century, and the vessel was even named the Asia's Titanic.
MV Doña Marilyn	24 October 1988	389	2	197	Further information: MV Doña Marilyn While sailing from Manila to Tacloban City, the vessel was caught up in Typhoon Unsang and sank. It was the sister ship of MV Doña Paz.						
MV Boholana Princess	15 December 1990	0	0	all passengers (300+)	While sailing from Cebu to Ormoc, the vessel ran aground near the Camotes Islands at 2am, and later capsized and sank at 6am.						
MV Princess of the Orient	18 September 1998	70	80	355	Further information: MV Princess of the Orient The 13,935-ton, 195-metre (640 ft) long vessel sailed from Manila to Cebu during a typhoon and capsized at 12:55 p.m. (PST) near Fortune Island in Batangas.						
MV Princess of the Stars	21 June 2008	437	605	32	Further information: MV Princess of the Stars MV Princess of the Stars capsized off the coast of San Fernando, Romblon at the height of Typhoon Frank. The ferry left Manila en route to Cebu City and was permitted to sail because the vessel was large enough to stay afloat in the typhoon's periphery. However, Frank unexpectedly changed course, placing the ferry closer to the storm. According to survivors the ship ran into rough seas and capsized off the coast of Romblon.						
MV Sulpicio Express Siete	16 August 2013	0	0	36	Further information: MV St. Thomas Aquinas On 16 August 2013 at 8:45pm as it approached Cebu City's harbor, the 2GO ferry the M/V St. Thomas Aquinas, formerly the SuperFerry 2, collided with the cargo ship the Sulpicio Express Siete of Sulpicio Lines and sank in 144 meters of water off Lauis Ledge Talisay, Cebu. The ship was carrying 831 people—715 passengers and 116 crewmembers. 629 people were rescued immediately. As of 17 August 2013 31 bodies had been recovered, leaving 172 unaccounted for. The Sulpicio Express Siete with 36 crew members on board did not sink and returned safely to port but sustained a large hole in its bow above the water line.						

== Legal controversies ==
Despite figuring in three major maritime disasters in the span of 11 years (from 1987 to 1998) resulting in the deaths of more than 5,000 people, the company was never held liable by the Philippine courts. PSACC has been accused of heavily overloading its ships, such as on MV Doña Paz when only 1,500 people appeared in the ship's manifest out of the 4,500 passengers and crew. As a result, PSACC has been referred to in the press as "Perwisyo (Nuisance) Lines" or "Suspicious Lines."

== See also ==
- MT Vector
- List of maritime disasters in the Philippines
