= Doña Marilyn =

Philippine ferry that sank in 1988

History

Japan
- Name: Otohime Maru
- Owner: RKK Line
- Builder: Onochimi Dockyard
- Completed: July 1966
- Fate: Sold to Sulpicio Lines

Philippines
- Name: Doña Ana
- Owner: Sulpicio Lines
- Acquired: 1976
- Maiden voyage: June 26, 1977
- Renamed: Doña Marilyn
- Refit: After a fire onboard October 8, 1978
- Identification: IMO number: 6618809
- Fate: Sank in Typhoon Ruby on October 24, 1988

General characteristics
- Type: Passenger ferry
- Tonnage: 2,947 GRT; 3,002 DWT
- Length: 97.6 m (320 ft)
- Beam: 13 m (43 ft)
- Installed power: 1 × Niigata Iron Works M8T54S 4-stroke diesel engine; 4,500 bhp (3,400 kW)
- Propulsion: 4-bladed single screw
- Speed: 21 knots (39 km/h; 24 mph)
- Capacity: 807 passengers
- Notes: Wreck sits at 33m deep on its starboard side

Doña Marilyn was a Philippine inter-island ferry owned and operated by Sulpicio Lines, Inc. Built in Japan as the Otohime Maru in 1966, it was purchased by Sulpicio Lines in 1976 and renamed the MV Doña Ana, it suffered a fire in October 8th, 1978 and underwent refitting, being put back on service as the Doña Marilyn.

In the afternoon of October 24, 1988, while sailing from Manila to Tacloban City, the vessel was caught up in Typhoon Ruby and sank near Higatangan (or Gigatangan) Island, Biliran, leaving approximately 400 dead or missing. Survivors numbered at least 181. Doña Marilyn was a sister ship of the ill-fated Doña Paz, which had sunk a year earlier in the deadliest ever peace-time maritime disaster.

== Sinking ==
The Doña Marilyn left Manila on October 23, 1988, at 10 am, heading for Tacloban City in Eastern Visayas. At least 511 people were on board the ship when it left the city, including the ship's complement. According to Vicente Gambito, Vice President of Sulpicio Lines, there were a total of 421 passengers. The ship's captain, Eliodoro Salgado Jr., had been with Sulpicio Lines for five months when he commanded the Doña Marilyn on October 23.

On October 24 at 2:14 am, Capt. Salgado sent a message to the coastal station of Sulpicio Lines in Manila about the large waves encountered by the ship, with him deciding to slow down the engine. At 7:28 am, Salgado had the engines stopped due to "very strong winds and big waves". Nearly an hour later, the captain informed the station that he decided to reverse course and head toward the North Gigantes island for safety, while adding that the vessel was expected to arrive at Tacloban around 8 pm later that day.

At 1:30 pm, the Doña Marilyn radioed a distress signal off of Tanguingui Island, earlier reported as Manoc-Manoc island, close to Masbate, which was the last signal from the ferry received by the station according to military officials. Due to strong winds and giant waves caused by Typhoon Ruby, locally known as Typhoon Unsang, the ship capsized at around 2 pm.

According to survivors, Captain Salgado was one of the first to abandon ship, after telling them to pray the rosary. He was never seen again. Many who survived were easily spotted by rescuers due to their life jackets, while others were saved by fishermen passing by. Some survivors were robbed by bandits with motorized canoes. One survivor, the ship's purser Kerwin Lim, reached the shore of Almagro Island after nearly a day at sea, but was later found robbed and murdered with red marks on his neck.

=== Aftermath ===
During the Senate's inquiry into the disaster, evidence such as the logbook of Sulpicio Lines was presented. Senator John Osmeña argued that because the shipping line and the Coast Guard knew about a typhoon nearing Tacloban from PAGASA, they should have been able to advise Captain Salgado to turn away from its destination before the typhoon reached Signal No. 3.

On October 31, Corazon Alma de Leon from the Department of Social Welfare and Development (DSWD) stated that Sulpicio Lines had agreed to provide ₱50,000 to each of the families of those who perished. Two days later, after Transportation and Communications Secretary Rainerio Reyes met with President Corazon Aquino, Reyes announced an indefinite suspension of all ferries operated by Sulpicio Lines from leaving their respective ports. Sulpicio Lines defied the order and continued operating, demanding a formal order be given to them before they suspend ferry operations. Eventually, an inter-agency committee was formed on November 5 to inspect all commercial Philippine vessels, and on the same day grounded all ships of Sulpicio Lines as it inspected the line's Cotabato Princesa ferry.

A few days after the committee was formed, the National Telecommunications Commission (NTC) suspended 14 further cargo and passenger vessels after inspecting 216 of them across the country due to malfunctioning navigational and communication facilities, so as to heighten standards for sea faring vessels after the Doña Marilyn incident.

The wreck of Doña Marilyn was first sighted by a fisherman named Bonifacio Rodrigo, who reportedly saw the sunken vessel on November 10 while he was diving in an area near Manoc-manoc Island, also known as La Manok Island.

Three weeks after the ship's sinking, Eliodoro Salgado Sr., the father of Capt. Salgado, offered to help the National Bureau of Investigation (NBI) under Ramon Barrot in finding his son, who at the time was reportedly hiding in Maripipi Island in the province of Biliran. Some survivors such as Alex Moron Jr. claimed seeing him board a life raft after he abandoned ship.

Soon after, NBI senior agent Zosimo Pebrero confirmed Capt. Salgado's presence in Barangay Ol-og, Maripipi, and a monetary reward of ₱50,000 was set for whoever was able to capture him. According to Speaker Pro Tempore Antonio Cuenco who was leading the search for Salgado, barangay officials refused to cooperate with NBI officials when they arrived on the island, and stated that he could be compelled to request for their arrests if necessary.

== Wreck ==
The wreck of the ship lies off the island of Malapascua, where it has been made into a diving attraction. It's been reported that the wreck site has had some of its features missing due to illegal salvaging for scrap metal selling.

== Survivors ==
There were conflicting reports on the exact number of survivors of the disaster; Martinia Mercado of the DSWD reported 181, while Reuters reported that at least 205 survived. Vicente Gambito, Sulpicio Lines Vice President, placed the figure at 197.

According to Gambito, 46 of the survivors were not on the ship's manifest, while Lynette Ordoñez of the Manila Standard stated it was at least 101. The Doña Marilyn Survivors Association was established after the incident, with Alex Moron Jr. as its president.

== See also ==
- List of maritime disasters involving the Philippine Span Asia Carrier Corporation
- List of maritime disasters in the Philippines
- Doña Paz
- Princess of the Orient
- Princess of the Stars
