= MV Span Asia 25 =

Span Asia 25
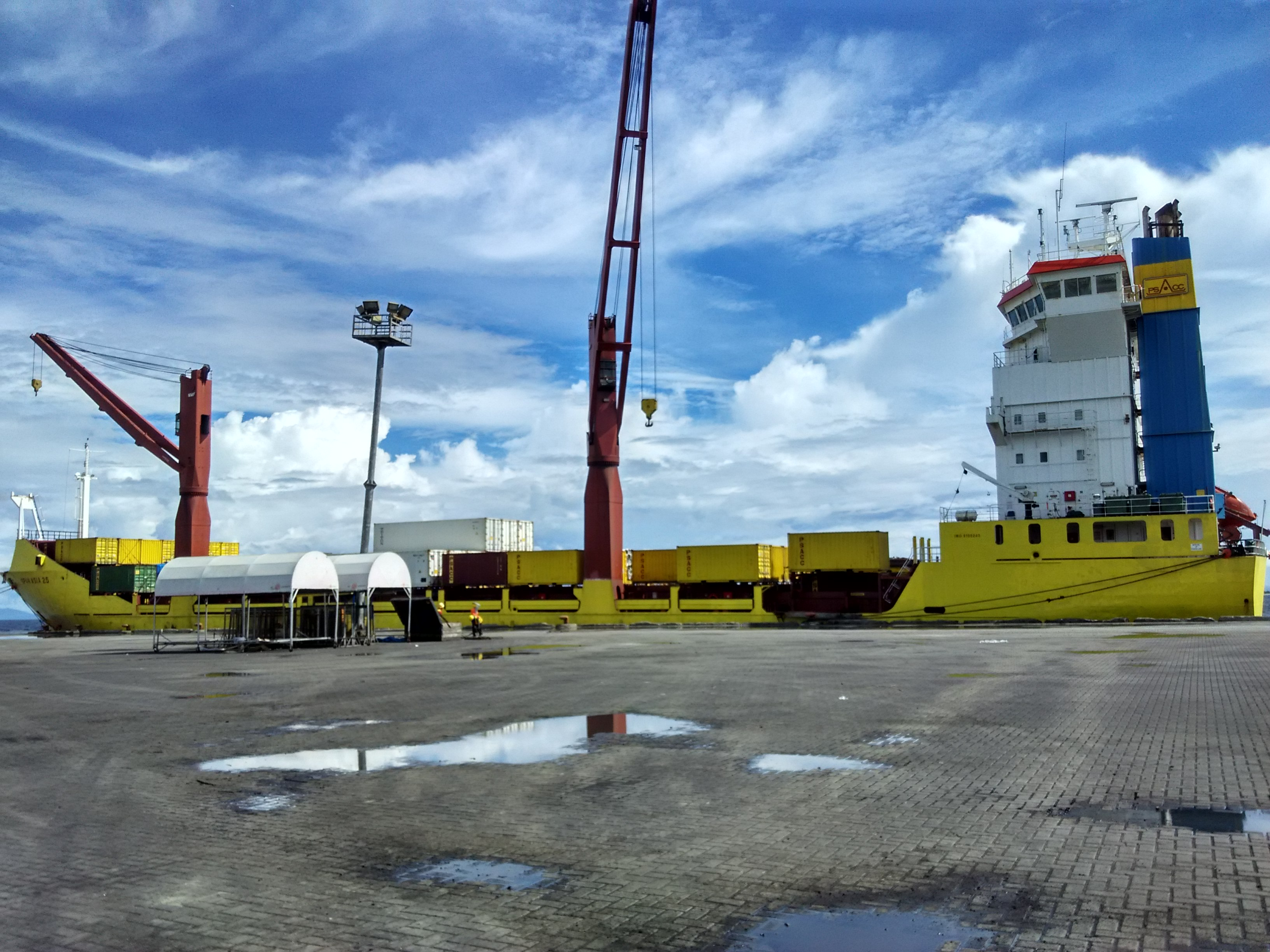
- MV Span Asia 25 is moored at the Zamboanga International Seaport.

History
- Name: Span Asia 25
- Owner: Philippine Span Asia Carrier Corporation
- Operator: Philippine Span Asia Carrier Corporation
- Port of registry: Cebu, Philippines
- Route: Inter-island services within the Philippines
- Builder: Orskov Shipbuilders Yard Frederikshavn, Denmark
- Launched: 28 April 1994
- Completed: 1994
- Identification: IMO: 9100243 MMSI: 548740200
- Status: In active service
- Notes: Heidi B up until September 1994; Maersk Euro Quinto until May 1997; Span Asia 25 (1997 - present)

General characteristics
- Type: Container Ship
- Tonnage: 6158 tons
- Length: 121.9 m
- Beam: 20.1 m
- Capacity: 703 TEU
- Crew: 20

MV Span Asia 25 is a container vessel owned and operated by the Philippine Span Asia Carrier Corporation (PSACC). She is the former Heidi B up until September 1994, Maersk Euro Quinto until May 1997, Helgafell up until March 2005, Seaboard Rio Haina up until June 2008, Rio Bogota until December 2009, and Mohegan up until 2016. She was built at Orskov Shipbuilders Yard - Frederikshavn, Denmark in 1994 with IMO number 9100243 and MMSI number 54840200. She has a tonnage of 6158 tons. Her deadweight is 7850 tons and has a length of 121.9 m and beam of 20.1 m.

She serves as a container ship for Philippine Span Asia Carrier Corporation (PSACC) for their domestic operations from Manila to Cebu City, Zamboanga City, Davao City, and General Santos City. Her port of call is at the Port of Cebu, where the shipping firm's headquarters is located.

Span Asia 25 is one of the newly acquired ships of Philippine Span Asia Carrier Corporation (PSACC) after they switched from passenger ferrying to container shipping following the incidents that had been from the former Sulpicio Lines.

== Capacity ==
The vessel has a carrying capacity of 703 TEU, including reefers and dry type containers.

== Features ==
The vessel is fitted with a waste and heat recovery system, which can save 10% of engine power. As most ports in the Philippines are not equipped with container cranes, the vessel itself is equipped with two (2) stationary cranes situated in its port side.

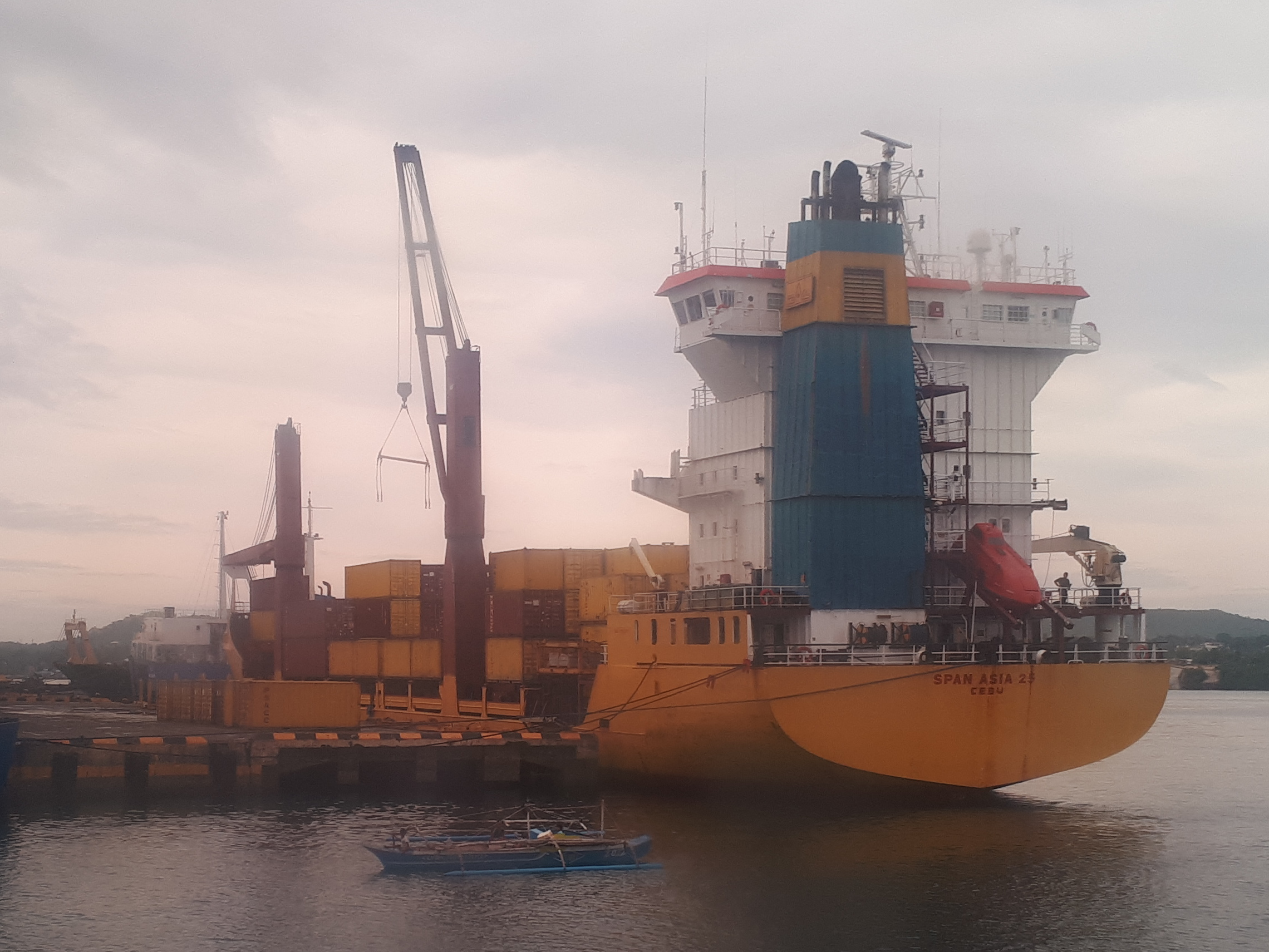
Span Asia 25 at Tagbilaran City Port on March 27, 2022. A submersible is visible.

== Notable former operators ==
- Sealift Container Shipping Lines
- Maersk Line
