= December 2009 Philippines ferry collision =

Maritime incident in the Philippines

The December 2009 Philippines ferry collision was a collision between two vessels, a commercial ferry and a small fishing boat, in Manila Bay, in the Philippines, on 23 December 2009. Both vessels sank as a result of the collision. 73 people were on board. 46 were rescued. No bad weather conditions were reported, and the cause of the collision remains undetermined.

The ferry involved was the MV Catalyn V, bound for Lubang Island, about 150 kilometers south of Manila.

== See also ==
- List of maritime disasters in the Philippines
