= Philippine Span Asia Carrier Corporation =

Shipping company in the Philippines

- Type: Shipping Line
- Industry: Shipping
- Founded: September 1, 1973; 52 years ago
- Founder: Sulpicio Go
- Headquarters: Don Sulpicio Go Bldg. Sulpicio Go St. North Reclamation Area, Cebu City, Philippines
- Area served: Philippines
- Key people: Jordan Go (President and CEO)
- Services: Passenger sea transport (formerly), freight sea transport
- Website: www.spanasiacarrier.com

Philippine Span Asia Carrier Corporation (PSACC), formerly branded as Sulpicio Lines, Inc. (SLI, Tagalog pronunciation: [sulˈpiːʃo]), is a major shipping line in the Philippines. PSACC is one of the largest domestic shipping and container companies in the Philippines in terms of the number of vessels operated and gross tonnage. The company provides inter-island cargo services throughout the major ports and cities in the Philippines.

== History ==
Philippine Span Asia Carrier Corporation (PSACC) was established as Sulpicio Lines by Go Guioc So. Commonly known as Sulpicio Go, Go was a Chinese merchant from Amoy (now Xiamen) who emigrated to the Philippines in 1919 with his siblings. With his brother he set up a shipping enterprise in Eastern Visayas. In 1953, Go served as the managing partner of Carlos A. Gothong Lines, Inc.

Sulpicio Go established his own venture with his sons by founding Sulpicio Lines in September 1973, starting with a fleet of 17 vessels, 1 tugboat and 5 barges. Sulpicio Lines catered to a niche market, opening tertiary and developmental passenger routes to isolated communities in Central and Eastern Visayas.

Sulpicio Lines grew to be the largest domestic shipping company in the Philippines, with a fleet of 22 passenger and cargo vessels and a market share of 20 percent of domestic sea traffic in the Philippines in 1988.

The company experienced multiple marine disasters, including the 1987 sinking of the Doña Paz, the sinking of the Doña Marilyn in 1988, the sinking of the Princess of the Orient in 1998, and the 2008 sinking of the Princess of The Stars during the occurrence of Typhoon Fengshen (PAGASA name: Frank). In 2009, the PSACC adopted its current name discontinuing the use of "Sulpicio Lines" to refer to the company.

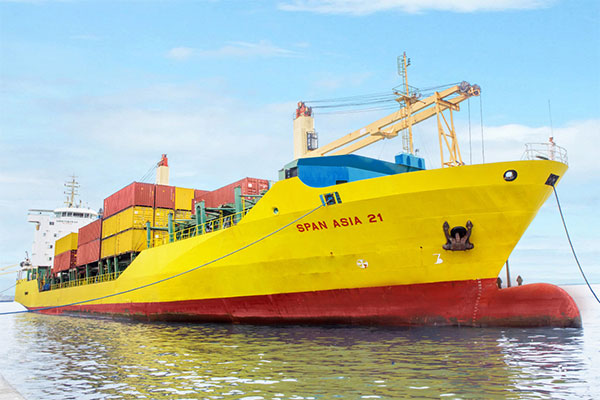
PSACC MV Span Asia 21

In January 2015, almost 7 years after the sinking of Princess of the Stars, the Maritime Industry Authority decided to revoke the company's certificate of public convenience (CPC), which meant that the company could no longer legally transport passengers.

The Court of Appeals, in a 237-page landmark decision dated June 28, 2024, written by Justice Wilhelmina Jorge-Wagan, held that Philippine Span Asia Carrier Corporation formerly Sulpicio Lines, Inc. was guilty of gross negligence and consequently liable for the deaths of 814 passengers and 500 missing in the Princess of the Stars shipwreck. In upholding the Manila Regional Trial Court Branch 49's judgment, the CA ordered PSACC owners Enrique Go, Eusebio Go, Carlos Go, Victoriano Go, Dominador Go, Ricardo Go, Edward Go and Edgar Go, to pay a total of P129,854,502.57 damages to the victims' heirs, survivors, families and relatives, represented by counsel Persida Acosta.

== Ports of Call ==
Philippine Span Asia Carrier's main ports of call are the cities of Manila and Cebu. Other ports of call are:

- Bacolod
- Cagayan de Oro
- Cotabato
- Dipolog
- Dumaguete
- Davao
- General Santos
- Iligan
- Iloilo
- Nasipit, Butuan
- Ozamiz
- Puerto Princesa
- Surigao
- Tacloban
- Tagbilaran
- Zamboanga

== Current fleet ==
PSACC once had passenger RoRo (Roll on - Roll off) vessels. However, because of their disreputable public image after a series of ferry disasters, PSACC has been banned from carrying passengers and is currently limited to cargo shipping. As of July 2026, PSACC has 19 vessels. Currently PSACC is undergoing a fleet modernization program to replace old vessels with new ones.

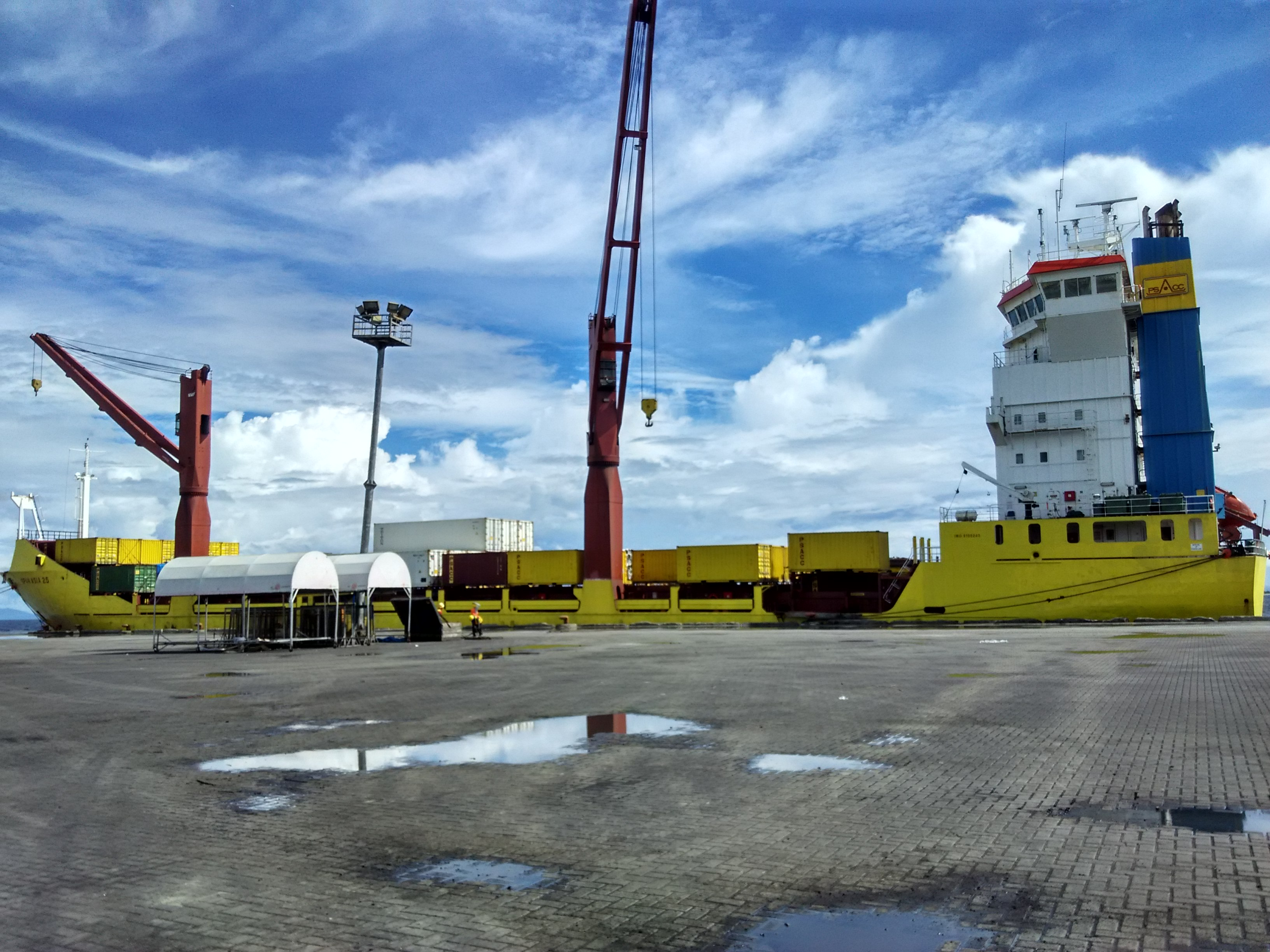
Span Asia 25 docked at the Zamboanga International Seaport

- Span Asia 25
- Span Asia 37
- Span Asia 39
- Span Asia 50
- Span Asia 51
- Span Asia 52
- Span Asia 53
- Span Asia 55
- Span Asia 59
- Span Asia 70
- Span Asia 71
- Span Asia 72
- Span Asia 73
- Span Asia 75
- Span Asia 77
- Span Asia 79
- Span Asia Go 200
- Span Asia Go 201

== Former Fleet ==
This list includes all of the ships that were part of Philippine Span Asia Carrier Inc. and Sulpicio Lines:

=== Roll on/Roll off (RORO) ===
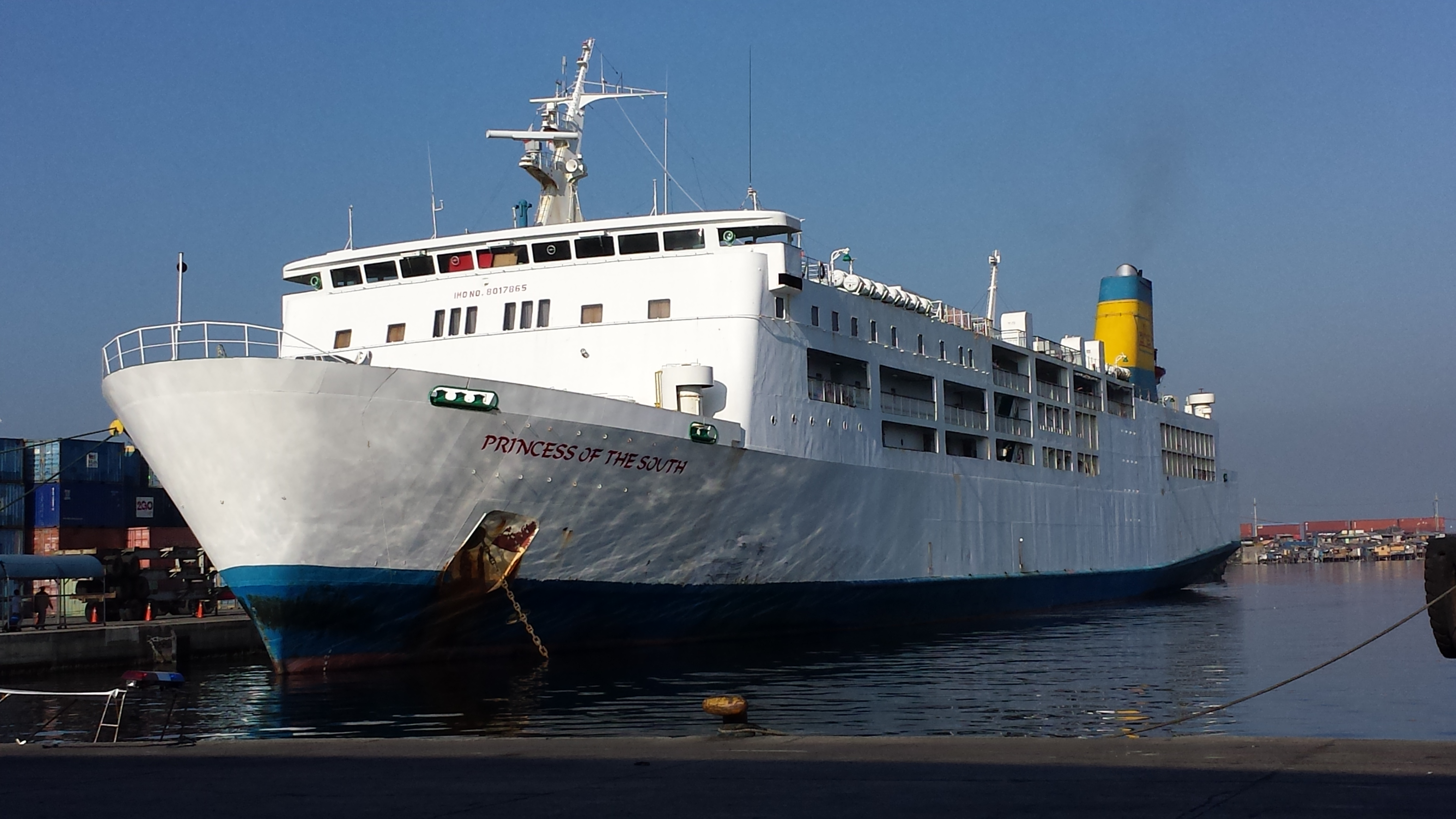
MV Princess of the South, the former flagship of Philippine Span Asia Carrier Corporation

- Princess of the Stars (capsized & sunk in 2008 near San Fernando, Romblon, with the loss over 800 lives. Was later broken up in Navotas, Former Flagship 2004 - 2008)
- Princess of the Orient (sunk near Batangas during a typhoon in 1998, over 70 died, with almost 80 people missing, Former Flagship 1993 - 1998)
- Cotabato Princess (sold & broken-up in Villono Shipyard)
- Nasipit Princess (sold & broken-up)
- Filipina Princess (sold to breakers in China, Former Flagship 1988 - 1993)
- Manila Princess (sold and broken up)
- Princess of The Paradise (sold to breakers in China)
- Princess of The Ocean (sold to breakers in China)
- Princess of The Pacific (sold & broken-up)
- Princess of New Unity (sold & broken-up sometime in the 2000s)
- Princess of the World (caught fire in Zamboanga)
- Princess of The Universe (sold to breakers in India, Former Flagship 1998 - 2004)
- Princess of The South (sold & broken-up, Former Flagship 2008 - 2014)
- Princess of the Earth (Sold to Trans-Asia Shipping as Trans Asia 10)
- Cagayan Princess (sold to Roble Shipping Inc. as M/V Theresian Stars)
- Cebu Princess (sold to Roble Shipping Inc. as M/V Joyful Stars)
- Boholana Princess (capsized & sunk after running aground in the Camotes Islands in 1990.)
- Tacloban Princess (sold & caught fire, later declared a total loss)
- Surigao Princess (sold and broken up)

=== Cruisers ===
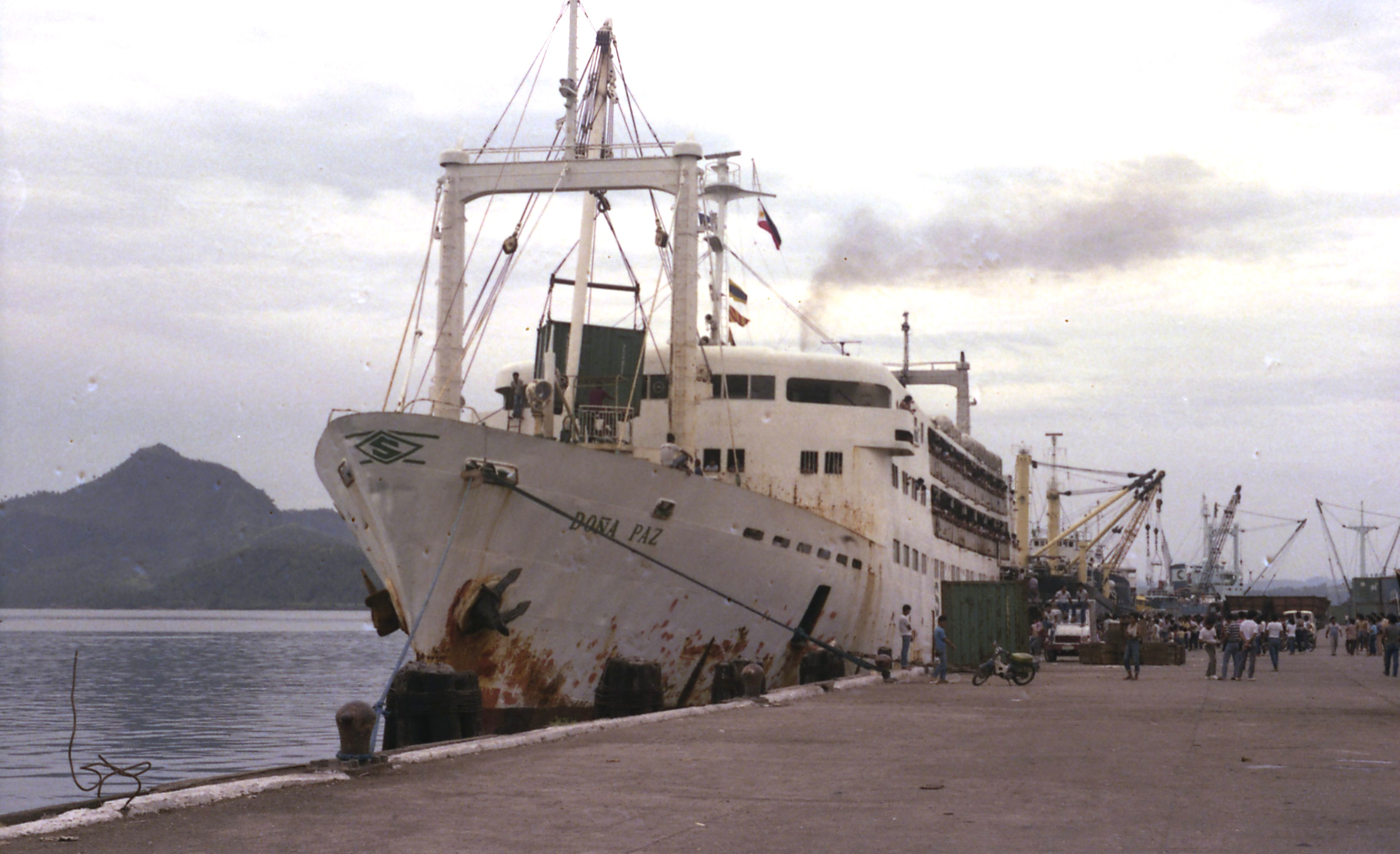
MV Doña Paz

- Doña Paz (formerly called Don Sulpicio, caught fire after colliding with an oil tanker, resulting in over 4000 lives lost: the deadliest peacetime maritime disaster in history superseding the sinking of the Titanic seven decades prior)
- Doña Marilyn (formerly called Doña Ana, sank October 24, 1988 in Typhoon Ruby, known as Unsang in the Philippines. 391 dead or missing; 300 survivors)
- Philippine Princess (caught fire in 1997, later broken-up, Former Flagship 1984 - 1988)
- Princess of The Caribbean (sold to breakers in China)
- Iloilo Princess (formerly called Don Enrique and Davao Princess sunk in Pier 7, sold & broken-up)
- Palawan Princess (sold & broken-up)
- Dipolog Princess (sold to breakers in China)

=== Other Vessels ===
- Don Alberto
- Don Manuel
- Don Enrique
- Don Carlos
- Don Camillo
- Don Lorenzo
- Don Alfredo
- Doña Vicenta
- Doña Gloria
- Doña Pamela
- Doña Angelina

=== Cargo Vessels ===
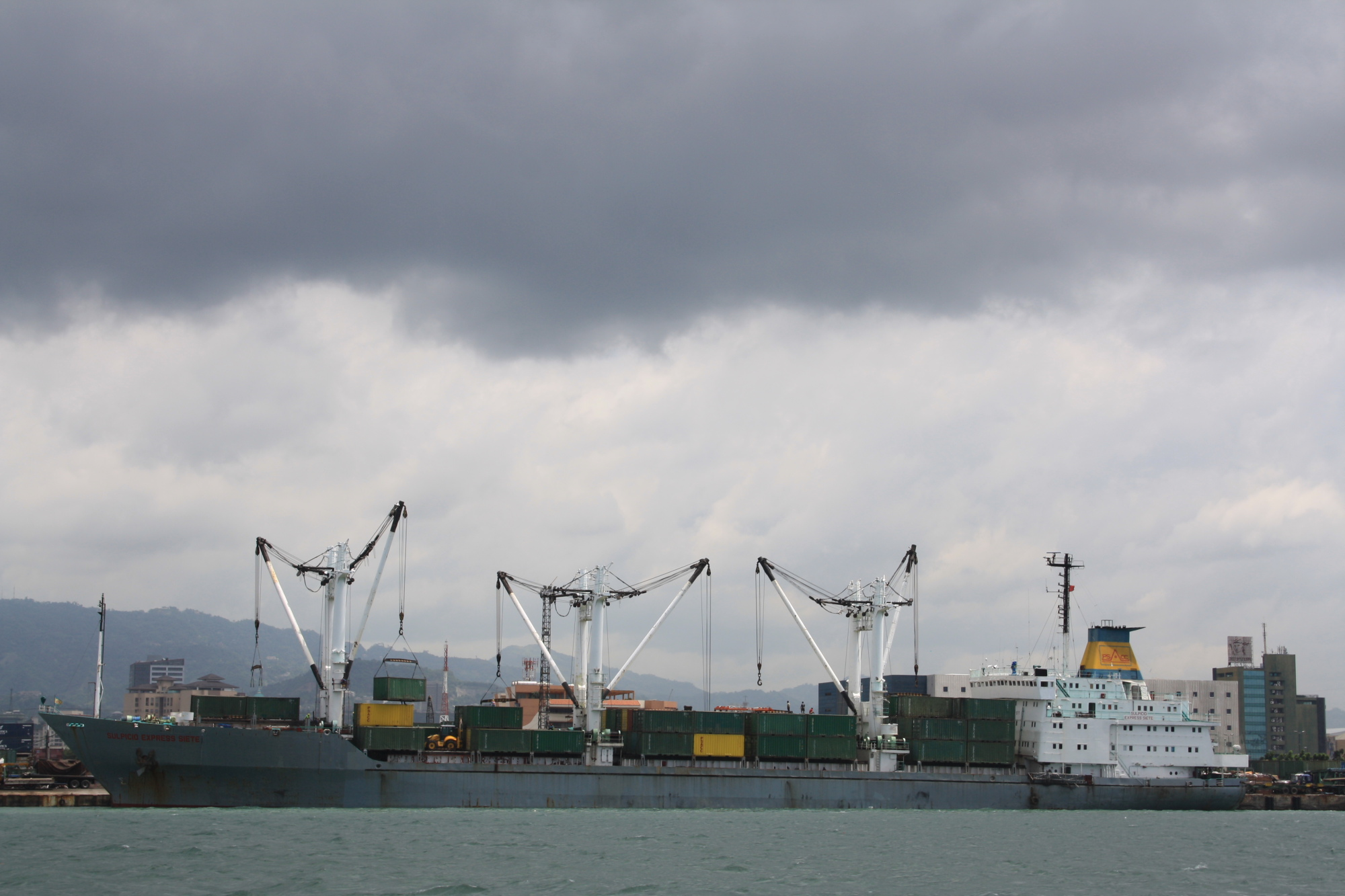
MV Sulpicio Express Siete

- Span Asia 1
- Span Asia 2
- Span Asia 3
- Span Asia 5
- Span Asia 7
- Span Asia 9
- Span Asia 10
- Span Asia 11
- Span Asia 12
- Span Asia 14
- Span Asia 15
- Span Asia 16
- Span Asia 17 (Former name MV Sulpicio Express Siete. Was involved in a collision with the ferry MV St. Thomas Aquinas on August 16, 2013)
- Span Asia 19
- Span Asia 20
- Span Asia 21
- Span Asia 22
- Span Asia 23
- Span Asia 27
- Span Asia 29
- Span Asia 30
- Span Asia 31
- Span Asia 32
- Span Asia 33
- Span Asia 35
- Sulpicio Express Uno
- Sulpicio Container I
- Sulpicio Container II
- Sulpicio Container III
- Sulpicio Container IV
- Sulpicio Container V
- Sulpicio Container VII
- Sulpicio Container VIII
- Sulpicio Container IX
- Sulpicio Container X
- Sulpicio Container XI
- Sulpicio Container XII
- Sulpicio Container XIV
- Sulpicio Container XV

=== Tugboats ===
- Edmund
- Sulpicio Tug

== See also ==
- List of maritime disasters involving the Philippine Span Asia Carrier Corporation
