= Princess of the Orient =

Ferry that sank in 1998 near the Philippines

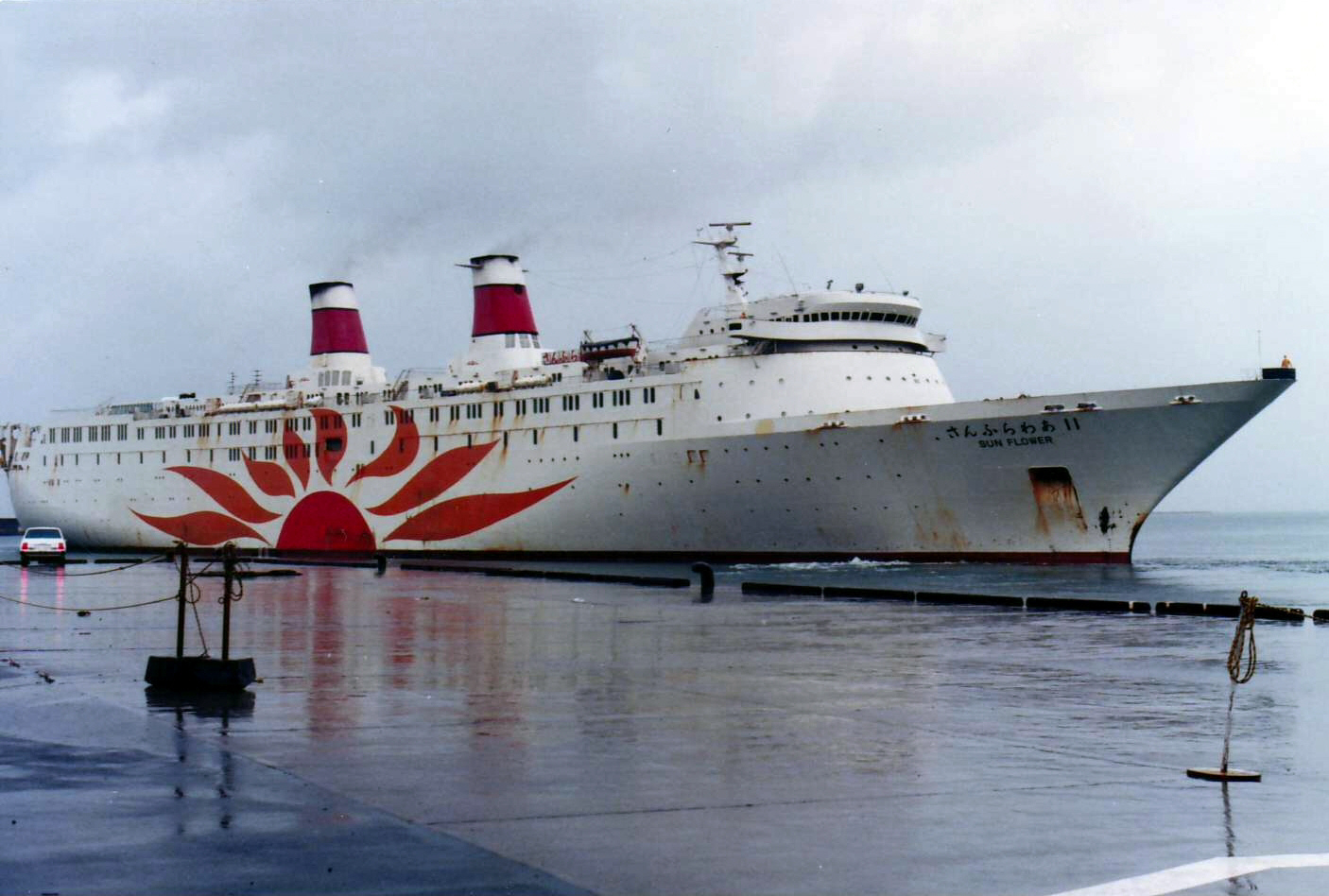
- Princess of the Orient was the former Sun Flower 11, while she was still in Japan

History

Japan
- Name: 1973-1990: Sun Flower 11; 1990-1993: Sun Flower Satsuma
- Owner: 1973-1990: Nippon Kosoku Ferry Co., Ltd.; 1990-1993: Blue Highway Line
- Operator: 1973-1990: Nippon Kosoku Ferry Co., Ltd.; 1990-1993: Blue Highway Line
- Port of registry: 1974-1990: Tokyo; 1990-1993: Matsuyama
- Route: Osaka – Kagoshima
- Builder: Shin Kurushima Dockyard Co. Ltd., Onishi Plant, Japan
- Cost: ¥ 6 Billion
- Laid down: 4 December 1973
- Launched: 23 September 1974
- Completed: 9 September 1974
- In service: 1 October 1974
- Out of service: March 1993
- Identification: IMO number: 7373561
- Fate: Sold to Sulpicio Lines

Philippines
- Name: Princess of the Orient
- Owner: Sulpicio Lines
- Operator: Sulpicio Lines
- Port of registry: Cebu City, Philippines
- Route: Manila – Cebu City
- Maiden voyage: June 1993
- Out of service: 18 September 1998
- Identification: Call sign: DUAO8
- Fate: Foundered and sank during Typhoon Vicki (1998) on September 18, 1998.

General characteristics
- Class & type: ROPAX Cruiseferry
- Tonnage: 13,935 GT
- Length: 195.81 m (642 ft 5 in)
- Beam: 24.0 m (78 ft 9 in)
- Depth: 8.6 m (28 ft 3 in)
- Installed power: Kawasaki MAN V9V52/55
- Propulsion: Dual propellers
- Speed: 26.87 knots (Max)
- Capacity: 3,994 passengers and crew, 84 trucks, 191 cars (max)

The Princess of the Orient was a passenger ferry owned by Sulpicio Lines that sank off Fortune Island, near the provinces of Cavite and Batangas in the island of Luzon, The Philippines on September 18, 1998. The ship was originally built in Japan as Sun Flower 11 (Japanese: さんふらわあ11, romanized: Sanfurawā 11) in 1974 where she served as a cruise ferry before being sold to Sulpicio Lines in 1993.

== Background ==
The ferry was built in 1973 by Shin Kurushima Dockyard, as one of the five ships in the Sun Flower series for Nippon Kosoku Ferry Co., Ltd. (Japanese: 日本高速フェリー, romanized: Nippon Kosoku Ferī) in Japan. She was named the Sun Flower 11 (Japanese: さんふらわあ11, romanized: Sanfurawā 11). The ship was designed differently from the other ships of the fleet, resembling a cruise ship of its era, with two funnels and a rounded superstructure. The ship entered service on the Osaka - Kagoshima route in October 1974. Blue Highway Line acquired the ferry in November 1990, and renamed her Sun Flower Satsuma (Japanese: さんふらわあ さつま, romanized: Sanfurawā Satsuma). She measured 13,935 gross tons and was 195.7 meters long. She had a capacity of 3,995 passengers and crew.

After 19 years of service in Japan, she was retired and sold to Sulpicio Lines in 1993. A cargo ramp on the starboard bow was fitted on the ship, plus an extension of passenger decks. She became the flagship of the Sulpicio fleet due to her size and beauty. She was the largest Philippine-based passenger ferry in service until the arrival of MV Princess of the Stars in 2004. She was the only Philippine-based ferry with automatic stabilizers at the time.

In 1997 the ship was damaged after its engine room caught fire while docked at Manila North Harbor and was sent to Singapore for repairs. As a result, the stabilizers remained un-operational, and she developed a slight but noticeable list on her port side, a sign which was inconsequential until mid-1998.

== Sinking ==
On September 18, 1998 around almost 10 PM, the Princess of the Orient sailed from Manila to Cebu City during the onslaught of Typhoon Vicki. Initially, a list of three degrees was observed at the portside, which had continuously increased. At the same time, winds and waves were hitting the ship on its starboard side. The waves were at least seven to eight meters in height and the wind velocity was 25 knots.

Due to large swells and excessive movement, the solid and liquid cargo below decks shifted its weight to port, contributing to the tilted position of the ship. The captain ordered a reduction in the ship's speed to 14 knots, and put ballast water in the starboard-heeling tank, hoping to stop the continuous listing of the ship. This action was in vain, as the vessel was already listing between 15 and 20 degrees to her portside.

In spite of being in a dangerous situation, the captain performed various starboard maneuvers, which added to the ship's tilting. As the ship was already inclined at an angle of 15 degrees along with the instantaneous movement of the ship, the cargo below deck completely shifted in position and weight towards the port side. Two hours after leaving Manila harbor, the ferry tilted 30 to 45 degrees, making it impossible to recover.

The captain declared to abandon ship, and it eventually foundered at 12:55 a.m. near Fortune Island and sank. Of the 388 passengers on board, 150 were killed. Either being trapped inside the ferry or being swept away by the waves, eventually drowning. The remaining survivors floated at sea for more than 12 hours before rescuers were able to reach them.

== Wreck ==
The wreck is resting on her Port side at 122 meters (400 ft) below sea level near Fortune Island. The wreck remained intact since its sinking. In the early 2000s, John Bennett and Ron Loos made the first scuba dives to the wreck site. It appeared probable that the cause of the sinking was due to the cargo on the ship not being lashed properly. The rough seas from Typhoon Vicki caused the cargo of the ship to shift, causing the ship to tilt to one side, resulting in the sinking.

In 2018 and 2019, a mixed gas 5-man international rebreather team captured images of the wreck and explored it, at depths up to 128m.

== See also ==
- List of maritime disasters involving the Philippine Span Asia Carrier Corporation
- List of maritime disasters in the Philippines
