= MV St. Thomas Aquinas =

Philippine ferry which sank in 2013

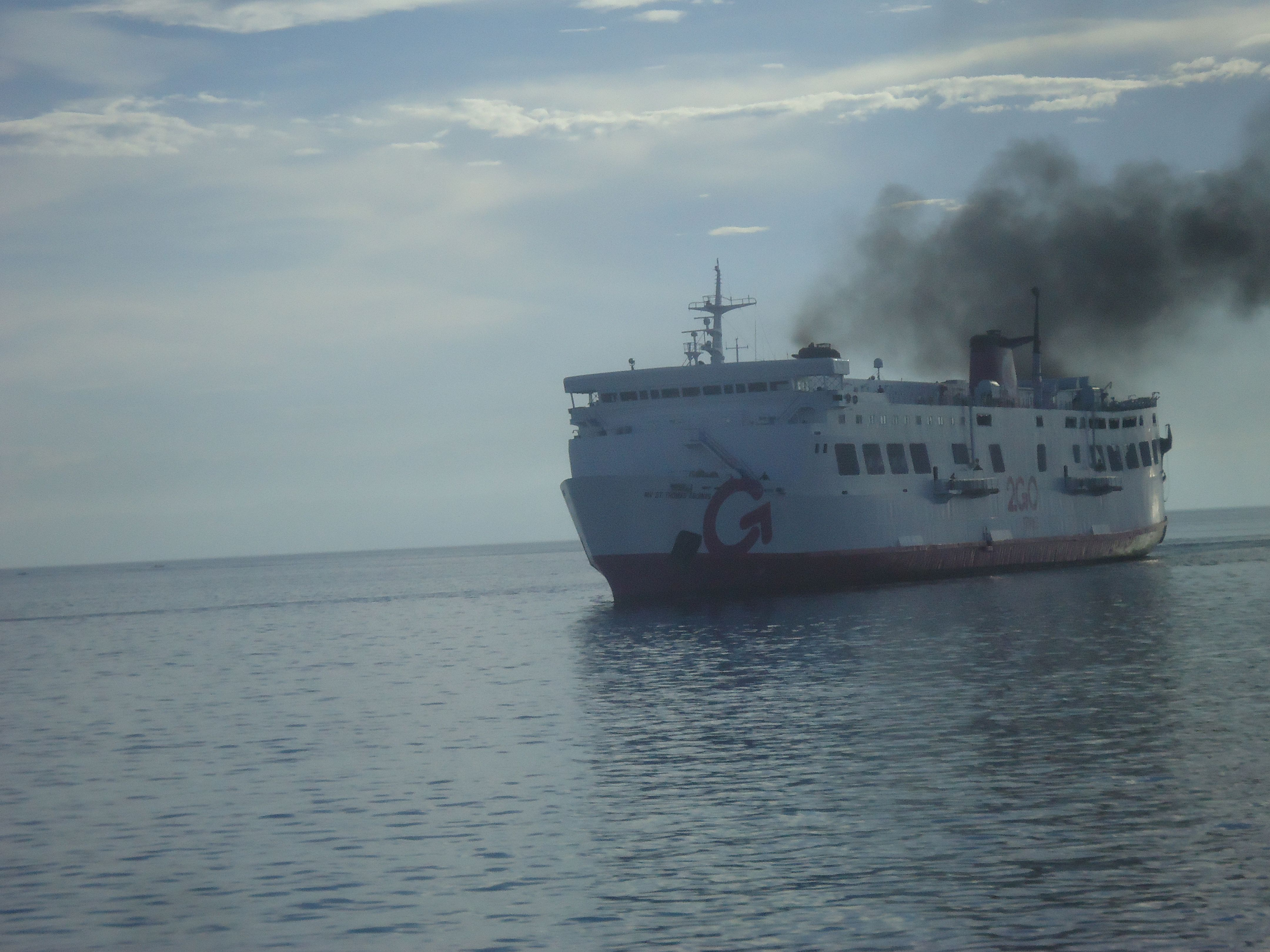
- MV St. Thomas Aquinas leaving Tagbilaran City in May 2013, more than three months before her sinking.

History

Japan
- Name: Ferry Sumiyoshi
- Owner: Meimon Car Ferry K.K.
- Operator: Meimon Car Ferry K.K.
- Port of registry: Kitakyushu, Japan
- Route: Osaka – Shin-moji, Kitakyushu
- Ordered: 1 January 1972
- Builder: Onomichi Dockyard Co, Onomichi, Hiroshima, Japan
- Yard number: 239
- Laid down: 1 August 1972
- Launched: 19 December 1972
- Completed: 20 March 1973
- Out of service: 1992
- Identification: IMO number: 7304663
- Fate: Sold to Aboitiz Shipping Corporation

Philippines
- Name: 1992–1996: Aboitiz SuperFerry 2; 1996–2012: SuperFerry 2; 2012–2013: St. Thomas Aquinas
- Namesake: Thomas Aquinas
- Owner: 1992–1996: Aboitiz Shipping Corporation; 1996–2003: WG&A Philippines; 2003–2012: Aboitiz Transport System; 2012–2013: 2GO Group
- Operator: 1992–1996: Aboitiz SuperFerry; 1996–2003: WG&A SuperFerry; 2003–2012: SuperFerry; 2012–2013: 2GO Travel
- Port of registry: Manila, Philippines
- Route: Manila – Cebu – Iligan – Butuan – Nasipit (2013)
- Maiden voyage: 1992
- Out of service: 16 August 2013
- Home port: Manila
- Fate: Sank following collision with MV Sulpicio Express Siete

General characteristics
- Type: ROPAX Ferry
- Tonnage: 11,405 GT; 5,869 NT; 2,994 DWT
- Length: 138.61 m (455 ft)
- Beam: 22.15 m (72.7 ft)
- Draft: 5.80 m (19.0 ft)
- Ramps: 1 ramp (stern-port side)
- Installed power: 2x 14 cyl. MAN-Mitsubishi diesel marine engines (2 × 5,670 kW)
- Propulsion: Two shafts; fixed pitch propellers
- Speed: 19 knots (35 km/h; 22 mph)
- Capacity: 1972: 900 passengers; 1992: 2,643 passengers; 2003: 904 passengers

MV St. Thomas Aquinas was a Philippine-registered passenger ferry operated by 2GO Travel. On 16 August 2013, the vessel collided with a cargo ship named MV Sulpicio Express Siete of Philippine Span Asia Carrier Corporation (formerly Sulpicio Lines) and sank. As of 3 September 2013, there were 108 dead and 29 missing with 733 rescued as a result of the accident. The ship now rests at the bottom of the Mactan Channel.

== Service history ==
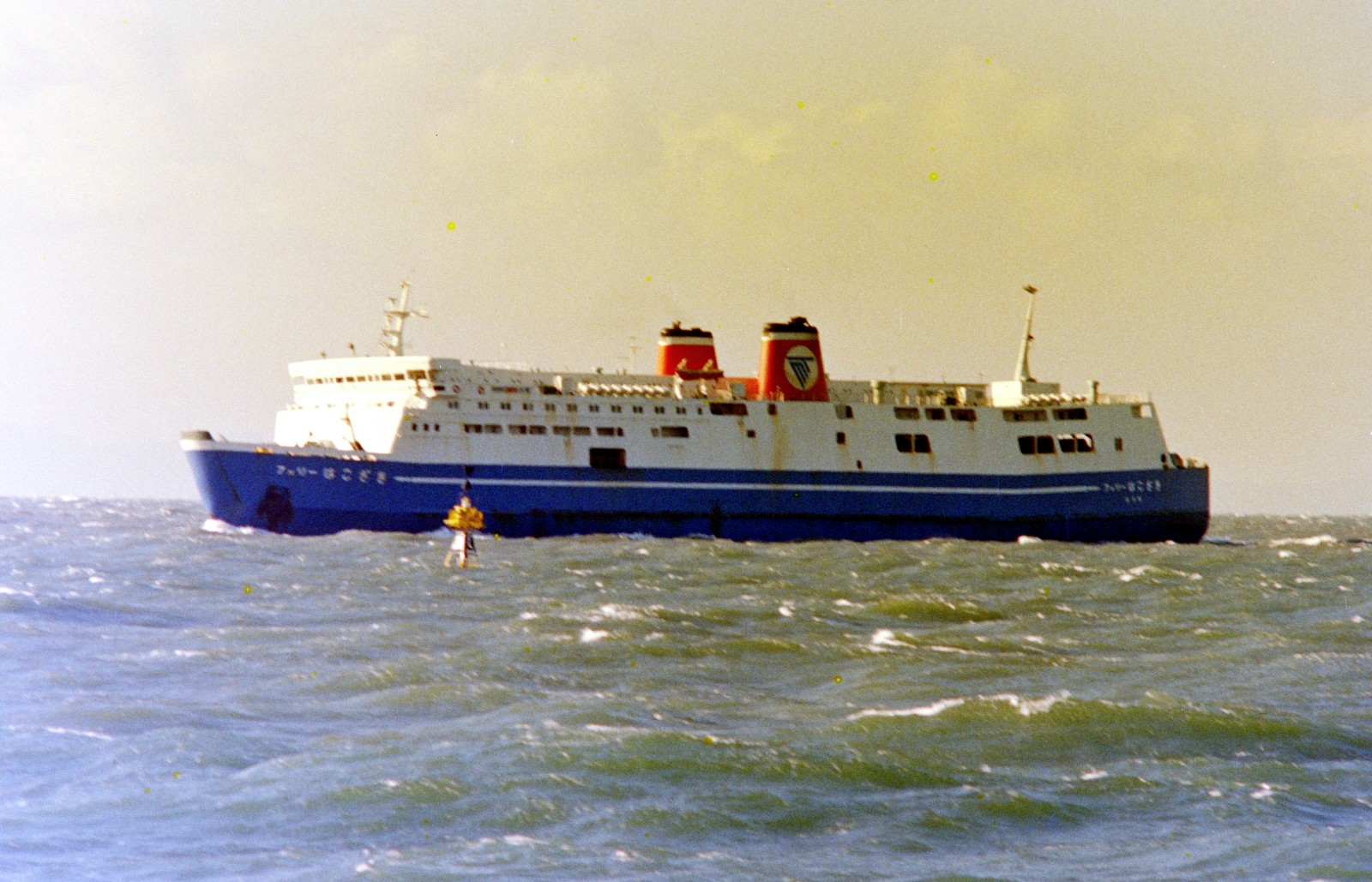
Ferry Hakozaki, the sister ship of MV St. Thomas Aquinas. This vessel was also sold to the Philippines and was renamed as MV SuperFerry 5 and later MV St. Joan of Arc.

M/V St. Thomas Aquinas started life as the Ferry Sumiyoshi (Japanese: フェリーすみよし) of Meimon Car Ferry (later as Meimon Taiyo Ferry) (Japanese: 名門大洋フェリー, romanized: Meimon Taiyō Ferī) in Japan. She was built in the Onomichi yard of Onomichi Zosen. Ferry Sumiyoshi's keel was laid on 1 August 1972, launched on 19 December 1972 and completed on 20 March 1973. The ship originally had one and a half passenger decks, two and a half cargo decks with a capacity of 900 passengers, a full bridge deck and vehicle ramps at the bow and at the stern. She was first fielded in the Osaka-Shin-moji, Kitakyushu route in Japan. She was the sister ship of Ferry Hakozaki which was later sold in 1994 to Aboitiz Shipping Corporation and was renamed as M/V SuperFerry 5 and later as the M/V St. Joan of Arc of 2GO Travel.

In April of 1992, she came to the Philippines to become the M/V Aboitiz SuperFerry 2 of Aboitiz Shipping Corporation. She was converted into a 4-deck multi-day passenger liner, increasing her passenger capacity to 2,643 passengers. A passenger gangplank was added together with a stern cargo ramp on her port side. Her full bridge deck and vehicle ramps at the bow and at the stern were later unused. She originally served the Manila-Cebu-Cagayan de Oro route.

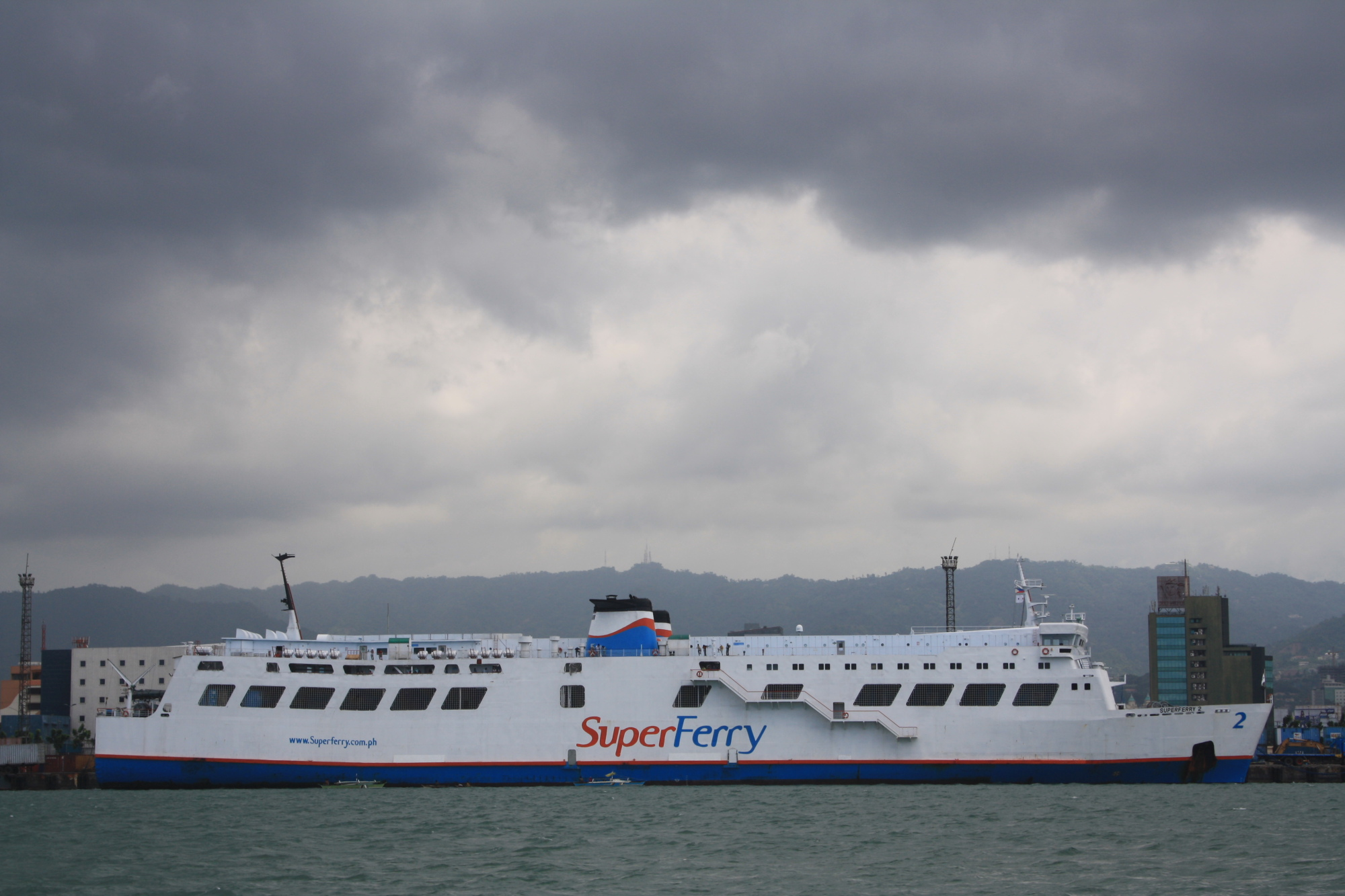
MV St. Thomas Aquinas as MV SuperFerry 2.

In 2007, she was converted from a 4-deck liner to just 2. The passenger capacity of M/V SuperFerry 2 dropped to only 904. The ship moreover became an all-air-conditioned ship.

Later on, with the buy-out of Aboitiz Transport System by Negros Navigation in 2012, she passed on to the newly-merged company 2GO. She was renamed as the M/V St. Thomas Aquinas, named after the Catholic Saint Thomas Aquinas.

She and her sister-ship M/V St. Joan of Arc (ex-Superferry 5/Ferry Hakozaki) were around 40 years old at the time of the sinking, making her one of the longest-serving Philippine-based passenger ships.

== Sinking ==
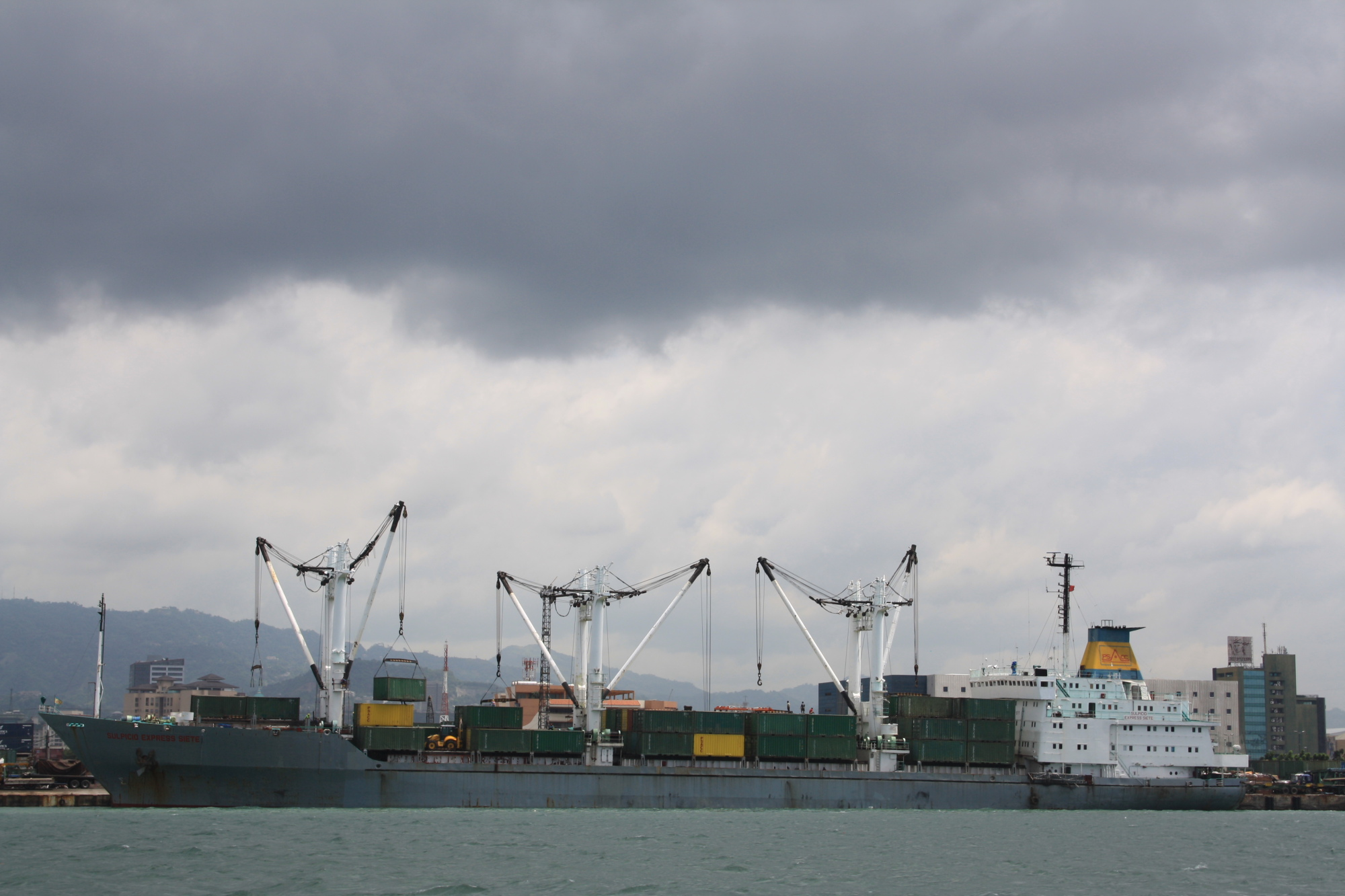
MV Sulpicio Express Siete, the other vessel that was involved in the collision.

=== Collision ===
On Friday, 16 August 2013, St. Thomas Aquinas departed from Nasipit, Agusan del Norte, on the southern Philippine island of Mindanao. At approximately 21:00 PHT (13:00 UTC), it was heading into the port at Cebu City via the Cebu Strait when it collided with the MV Sulpicio Express Siete (IMO 7724344), a cargo ship owned by the Philippine Span Asia Carrier Corporation that was leaving port, approximately 1.2 miles (1.9 km) from Talisay, Cebu.

St. Thomas Aquinas immediately began to take on water, prompting the captain to order an "Abandon Ship" announcement. The crew hurriedly handed out life jackets as hundreds of passengers jumped overboard. Within 30 minutes, the ship sank.

At the time of the collision, St. Thomas Aquinas was carrying 715 passengers (58 were infants) and 116 crew members. Many passengers were asleep at the time or otherwise had trouble finding their way to the deck in the dark. A spokesperson for 2Go said there was a high probability that some passengers were in the area of impact and were trapped by the damage. The Sulpicio Express Siete, which did not sink, had 36 crew members on board and was severely damaged at the bow in the accident.

Local fishermen saw several flares–a sign of distress–being launched from St. Thomas Aquinas and helped with initial rescue efforts. "We just picked up the survivors and left the dead in the water," said a rescuer. "I heard screams and crying." The National Disaster Risk Reduction and Management Council (NDRRMC) conducted rescue efforts. Rescued passengers were taken to local hotels.

=== Casualties ===
On Saturday, 17 August 2013, divers began the process of recovering bodies from the ship, which lay in 30 metres of water, but suspended operations later in the day due to safety concerns. 31 people were confirmed dead with 172 others missing as of midday, when rescue operations were suspended due to rough seas. By 18 August, there were 35 confirmed deaths and 85 others missing as a result of the accident. On 19 August, the Coast Guard confirmed 55 dead and 65 missing with 750 rescued. Rescue and recovery efforts were hampered by bad weather.

Many of the survivors were sickened after swallowing seawater and oil believed to have leaked from St. Thomas Aquinas.

=== Cause ===
In a statement, 2Go said St. Thomas Aquinas "was reportedly hit" by Sulpicio Line's cargo vessel, but at the same time refused to directly blame the cargo vessel. 2Go said the Port of Cebu is unusually narrow and that special traffic control measures were in use to try to avoid accidents at the port.

Maritime accidents in the Philippines are common due to a combination of bad weather, poor maintenance, and lax enforcement of safety regulations. The Philippine Span Asia Carrier Corporation (operator of Sulpicio Lines) has been involved in five maritime disasters, most notably the 1987 sinking of the ferry Doña Paz that resulted in an estimated 4,000+ deaths.

=== Official investigation ===
A Special Board of Marine Inquiry was opened on 23 August in Cebu City, led by Commodore Gilbert Rueras of the Philippine Coast Guard. The captains of the MV St Thomas Aquinas and the Sulpicio Express Siete testified, as did Captain Galipher Ian Faller, captain of a Trans-Asia Shipping Lines passenger ship in the area, the Trans Asia Nine. Captain Galipher of the Trans Asia Nine testified that the Sulpicio Line Siete was in the inbound lane instead of the outbound lane.

== Long-term implications ==
Oil and fuel are leaking from the shipwreck. The ferry was carrying 120,000 litres (31,701 US gal) of bunker fuel, 20,000 litres (5,283 US gal) of diesel fuel, and 20,000 litres (5,283 US gal) of lube oil. Owner 2Go used spill-containment equipment in the area, but local fishing was affected. The spilled petroleum is expected to contaminate local beaches and mangrove swamps, further damaging Cebu's ecosystem and economy.

== See also ==
- List of maritime disasters involving the Philippine Span Asia Carrier Corporation
- List of maritime disasters in the Philippines
- List of shipwrecks in 2013
