= Typhoon Ruby (1988) =

Pacific typhoon in 1988

Typhoon Ruby (Unsang)
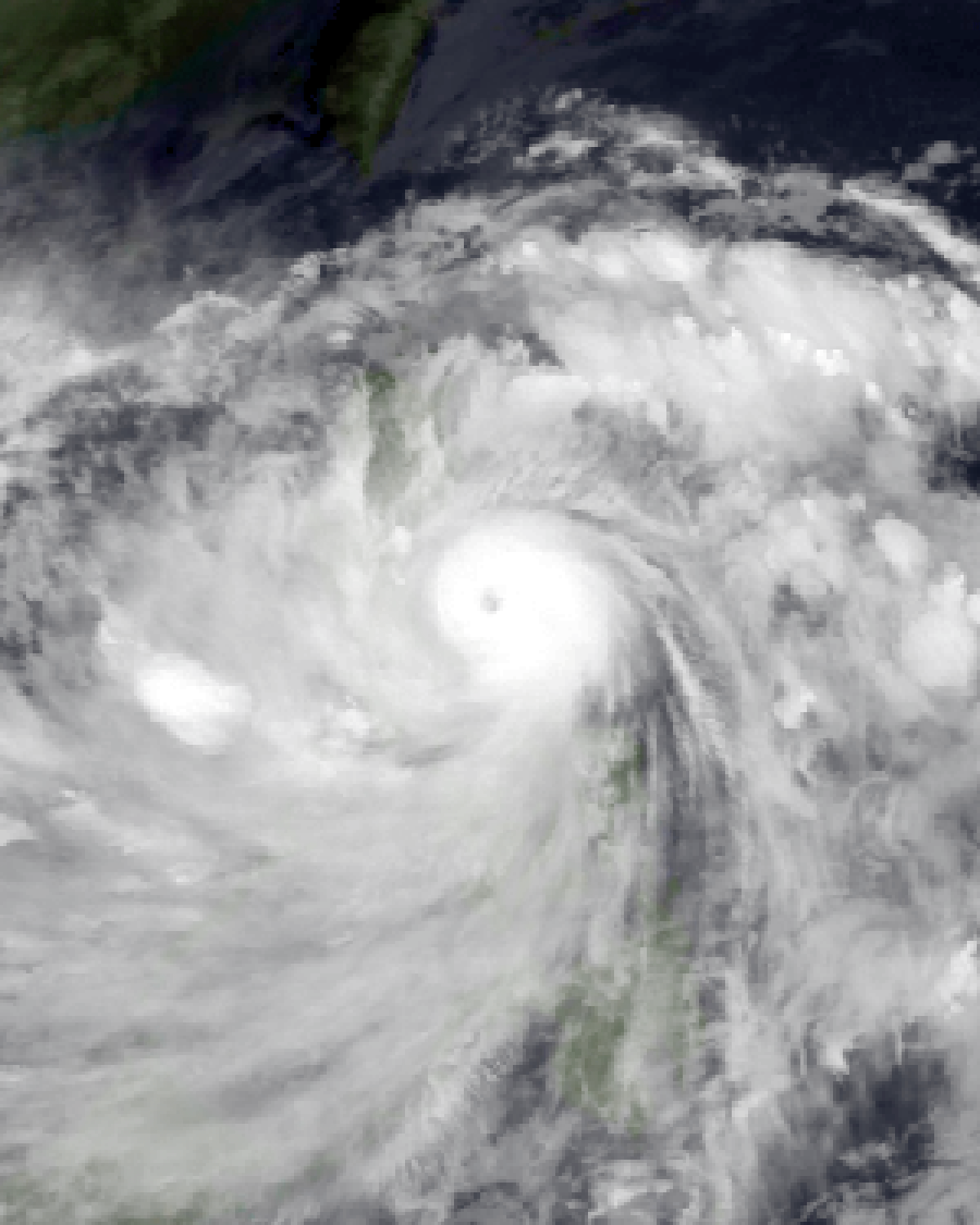
- Typhoon Ruby at peak intensity on October 24

Meteorological history
- Formed: October 20, 1988
- Dissipated: October 28, 1988

Typhoon
- 10-minute sustained (JMA)
- Highest winds: 140 km/h (85 mph)
- Lowest pressure: 950 hPa (mbar); 28.05 inHg

Category 4-equivalent typhoon
- 1-minute sustained (SSHWS/JTWC)
- Highest winds: 230 km/h (145 mph)
- Lowest pressure: 916 hPa (mbar); 27.05 inHg

Overall effects
- Fatalities: 288 total
- Damage: $311 million (1988 USD)
- Areas affected: Philippines, China
- IBTrACS
- Part of the 1988 Pacific typhoon season

Typhoon Ruby, known in the Philippines as Typhoon Unsang, was the strongest typhoon to strike the Philippines in 18 years. The tenth typhoon of the 1988 Pacific typhoon season, Ruby formed from an area of low pressure situated east of the Philippines on October 20. The storm steadily intensified as it moved west, and then west-northwest. After developing an eye, Ruby attained typhoon intensity on October 23 and began to strengthen at a brisker clip. Ruby reached maximum intensity later that day, before moving ashore along the central portion of Luzon early on October 24. The storm steadily weakened over land and this trend only continued after Ruby entered the South China Sea. On October 27, Ruby made a second landfall as a tropical storm on Hainan Island before dissipating the next day.

In addition to being the strongest typhoon to hit the Philippines since 1970, Ruby also brought widespread damage to the country. Ten people died after a tornado wiped away six villages near Cagayan de Oro. Elsewhere in the province, five people were killed, and 26,000 were left homeless. Five people were killed and 40 others were presumed dead when a bus fell under a river on Panay Island. Eleven people died and 15,000 people lost their homes in Marikina, a suburb of Manila.

The passenger ferry Doña Marilyn sank in the Visayan Sea en route from Manila to Tacloban City. At least 77 of the 511 people on board died, though there were initial reports of 261 missing. At least 110,000 people were left homeless. Approximately 200,000 dwellings were damaged, including roughly 39,000 that were destroyed. Furthermore, 208 people sustained injuries. Overall, damage in the island nation totaled $268 million (1988 USD), including $40 million in crop damage and $228 million in infrastructure damage. On Hainan Island, offshore China, two people were killed and damage totaled $35.6 million. Elsewhere, the storm was responsible for $9.89 million in damages and one death in the Fujian Province. Overall, 288 people died as a result of the typhoon.

== Meteorological history ==
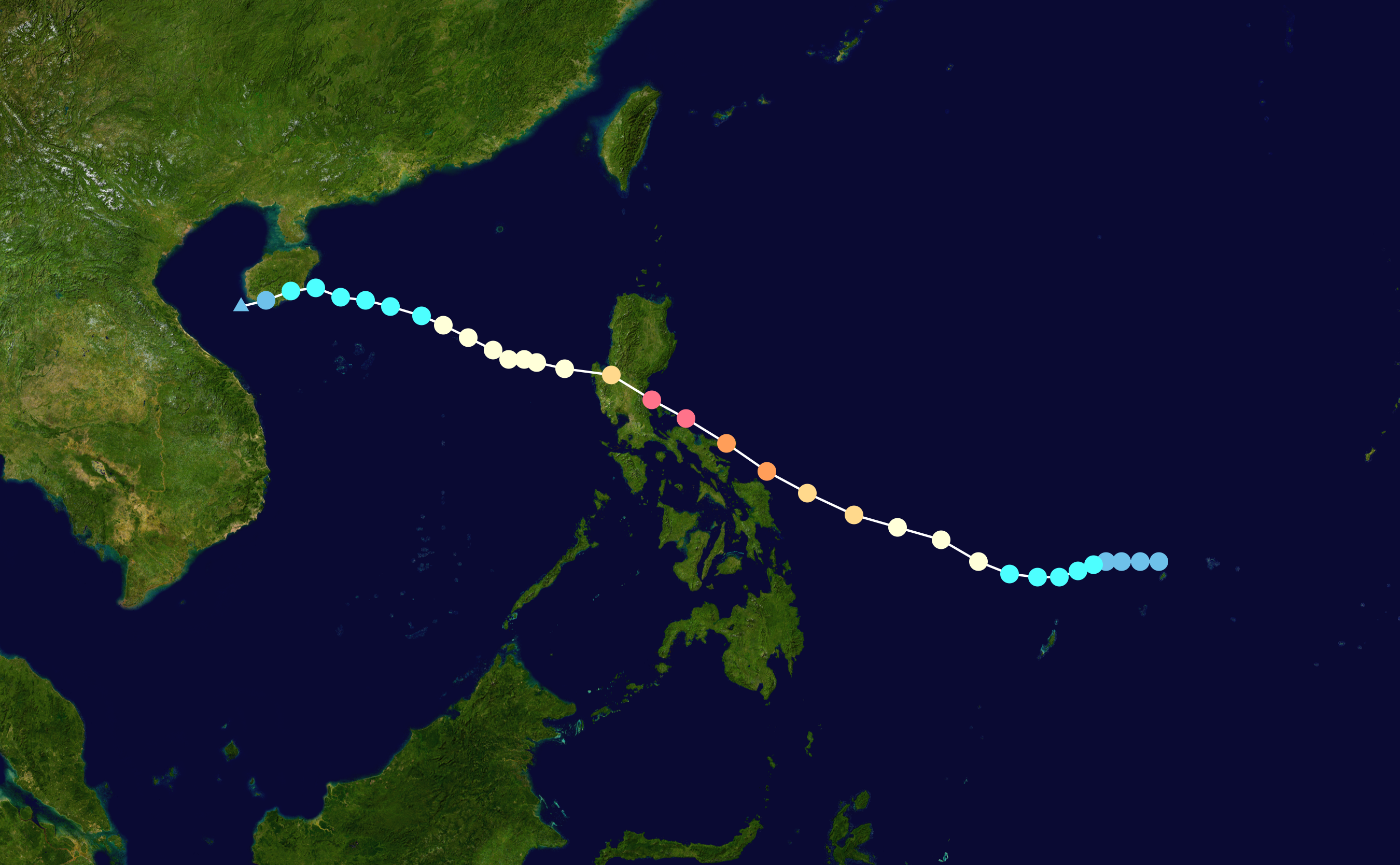
Map plotting the storm's track and intensity, according to the Saffir–Simpson scale Map key Saffir–Simpson scale Tropical depression (≤38 mph, ≤62 km/h) Tropical storm (39–73 mph, 63–118 km/h) Category 1 (74–95 mph, 119–153 km/h) Category 2 (96–110 mph, 154–177 km/h) Category 3 (111–129 mph, 178–208 km/h) Category 4 (130–156 mph, 209–251 km/h) Category 5 (≥157 mph, ≥252 km/h) Unknown Storm type Tropical cyclone Subtropical cyclone Extratropical cyclone, remnant low, tropical disturbance, or monsoon depression

Typhoon Ruby, the last of four typhoons to form in the basin during October 1988, originated from an area of disturbed weather that formed on October 20; consequently, both the Joint Typhoon Warning Center (JTWC) and Japan Meteorological Agency (JMA) started tracking the system at 18:00 UTC that day. (Note: The Japan Meteorological Agency is the official Regional Specialized Meteorological Center for the western Pacific Ocean.) Following an increase in deep convection, a Tropical Cyclone Formation Alert (TCFA) was issued by the JTWC early on October 21. At noon, the JTWC first classified the disturbance as a tropical depression while the JMA upgraded the disturbance into a tropical storm. (Note: Wind estimates from the JMA and most other basins throughout the world are sustained over 10 minutes, while estimates from the United States-based Joint Typhoon Warning Center are sustained over 1 minute. 10-minute winds are about 1.14 times the amount of 1-minute winds.) At the time of classification, the cyclone was situated about 1,760 km (1,095 mi) east-southeast of Manila on October 21 and moved southwestwards at first. Early on October 22, the depression was upgraded into a tropical storm, and was given the name Ruby by the JTWC. The same day, the Philippine Atmospheric, Geophysical and Astronomical Services Administration (PAGASA) also monitored the storm and assigned it with the local name Usang.

Initially, the storm continued to track towards the southwest, before taking on a westward course typical of a "straight runner". During the afternoon of October 22, the JMA upgraded Ruby into a severe tropical storm. Both agencies estimated that Ruby attained typhoon status on October 23. Despite developing a pinhole eye, intensity estimates from the JMA suggested that Ruby only strengthened slightly over the next 24 hours. However, data from the JTWC suggested that Ruby rapidly strengthened during this period, ultimately attaining a peak wind speed of 230 km/h (145 mph), and a minimum barometric pressure of 950 mbar (hPa; 28.05 inHg). Meanwhile, the JMA estimated maximum intensity of 135 km/h (85 mph) and the same pressure. Ruby accelerated westward to a speed of about 27 km/h (17 mph) in the general direction of Luzon. While maintaining a small 30 km (20 mi) wide eye, it made landfall over central Luzon early on October 24, while according to the JMA still at maximum intensity. This made Ruby the most intense tropical cyclone to strike the main island of Luzon since Typhoon Patsy of the 1970 season. The system entered the South China Sea the morning of October 25.

Based on analysis from the JMA, Ruby was believed to have maintained its intensity over land, although the JTWC noted that Ruby weakened substantially over land. During the evening of October 25, when it was about 350 km (215 mi) west-northwest of Manila, Ruby started a weakening trend. Meanwhile, the storm's forward motion slowed down significantly, and Ruby turned towards the west-northwest late on October 26. Around this time, the JMA downgraded Ruby into a severe tropical storm. While moving in the general direction of Hainan Island, the JTWC estimated that Ruby lost typhoon intensity on the morning of October 27. Increased northeasterly wind shear took its toll on the storm, resulting in continued weakening. During the afternoon of October 27, Ruby struck the island of Hainan, with the JMA estimating winds of 95 km/h (60 mph). Land interaction with the rugged terrain of the island accelerated the weakening trend, and after becoming devoid of deep convection, the JTWC ceased tracking Ruby late on October 28. Eighteen hours later, the JMA followed suit.

== Preparations ==
Prior to the arrival of Ruby, storm warnings were issued in the Visayas Islands, the northern coast of Mindanao and south to central portions of Luzon. Manila's international airport canceled more than 25 domestic flights on October 24, though international flights operated normally. Classes were suspended on October 22 in Manila, along with most private businesses and government offices. There, all major banks and the city's two stock markets suspended operations on October 24. Numerous ships at U.S. Naval Base Subic Bay were evacuated in advance of Ruby and only "mission-essential personnel" were on duty. All six U.S. military bases in the Philippines were put on maximum alert as the storm neared. Due to Ruby's threat to Hong Kong, a No 3. hurricane signal was issued, but was dropped on October 27 once the storm receded.

== Impact ==
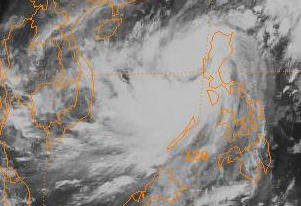
Typhoon Ruby over the South China Sea on October 25, shortly after crossing the Philippines

=== Philippines ===
Throughout the archipelago, Typhoon Ruby flattened homes, sank ships, and blew buses and trucks off freeways. Much of the entire island of Luzon lost power due to the typhoon. Ten people were feared dead, including one child, on October 23 when a tornado destroyed six villages near Cagayan de Oro. There, five others drowned in floodwaters triggered by flash flooding and 26,000 people were displaced from their homes. After the Agusan River overflowed its banks, 1,000 houses were destroyed, leading to more than 20,000 homeless. The Augsen Bridge was also destroyed by the typhoon. The typhoon killed fifteen people in the province of Zamboanga del Sur, six on Camiguin Island, three in Nueva Ecija, two in Surigao City and one in Nueva Ecija, Pampanga, Bulacan and Iloilo. In Cugman, Cagayan de Oro, six fatalities were reported, and 1,000 dwellings were destroyed, which resulted in 20,000 people displaced from their residence. In Mindoro Island, twenty people were killed, and roughly 250 houses as well as a bridge were destroyed. Elsewhere, three miners died in a landslide in Davao. Six people drowned in Zamboanga del Sur. According to military reports, a bus fell under the Sibalom River after a 300 m-long (985 ft) bridge, which the bus was atop of, collapsed. Consequently, five people were killed and 40 others were presumed dead, most of whom were either trapped inside the bus or were swept away by flood waters. Seventeen others were rescued. Five people died in Zamboanga del Sur, including one in Pagadian City. Around 3,000 people were evacuated due to rough seas in Legazpi, Albay. Approximately 150 dwellings were flooded in Cebu City.

In the capital Manila, power was knocked out, resulting in many downed trees, and numerous landslides were reported. The city itself suffered widespread flooding which left about 6,000 homeless, but no casualties were reported. The suburb of Marikina, however, sustained the worst impact of all Manila suburbs from the typhoon, where a river overflowed its banks, and 15,000 people were reported homeless. According to press reports, water levels in one subdivision of the suburb were nearly 2.5 m (8.2 ft) high, which forced homeowners to either hang on to oil containers, the trunks of banana trees, and other debris to stay afloat, or climb to the rooftops of two-story homes. Throughout the city, 11 casualties were reported. A Continental Airlines DC-10 jetliner, which carried 251 passengers from Hawaii, skidded while landing during heavy rain and nearly overshot the runway at the Manila airport, where 24 hour rainfall total exceeded 250 mm (9.8 in).

The 2,855,000 kg (2,855 t) passenger ferry Doña Marilyn sank during Ruby in the Visayan Sea, despite altering its course in an attempt to avoid the inner core of the typhoon. Several hours before the ship sank, crew members reported that the engine was failing. The vessel was last spotted about 325 km (200 mi) southeast of Manila, and was en route from Manila to Tacloban City. According to reports obtained from the Philippine Coast Guard, there were 243 confirmed survivors, although reports from the Associated Press suggested that as few as 193 people survived. Based on official government reports, the ferry had 451 passengers plus 60 crew members aboard, although many survivors claim there were over 1,000 crew and passengers, citing the fact that there were 1,200 life vests, and there was not enough of them for everyone on board at the time of the incident. Around a week after the storm, Manila newspapers reported that there were at least 52 people on board who were not officially reported as a passenger or crewman. The ship had taken over the route of a sister vessel, the Doña Paz, which sank the previous December with a death toll of more than 1,700.

A cargo ship picked up eight of the aforementioned survivors from the Doña Marilyn; eleven other survivors were found on Maripipi Island and on a nearby inlet, ten were discovered on Sambawan Island, and four others were found floating in the water. In Almagro, 137 survivors washed onshore on October 25, 120 of whom reached shore by either a life jacket or a life boat. Eighteen other survivors were buried in a common grave in Almagro and nine other bodies, also found in Almagro, were shipped to Tacloban. In Tacloban, six other survivors were buried, but over 60 survivors were also found on the island, and were transported on four buses and taken to receive medical treatment. Twenty-two were found on Samar Island, including two in Calbayog. Overall, the shipwreck was confirmed to have killed 77, even though 261 others were listed missing.

In a separate incident, the vessel Zenaida, with 20 people aboard was reported missing off Quezon province east of Manila. The USS Blue Ridge found four crewmen of the 90 m (295 ft) Philippine freighter Jet Nann Five, which sank to the south of where the Doña Marilyn sunk about 12 hours after the former left Cebu City for Mindanao. Fifteen of the 19 crewmen were reported as missing, and the four survivors were treated for second-degree sunburn, dehydration, and mild hypothermia. A Philippine navy landing ship and a hospital vessel both capsized in heavy waves off Zamboanga City, but no casualties were reported. A tugboat owned by the Philippine National Oil Company sank off the Bataan Peninsula, but no casualties occurred. A freighter, the Queen Raquel, broke loose in the storm and smashed into a seawall, which resulted in two security guards being rescued by firemen.

At least 110,000 people were left homeless. Additionally, 2,742,666 people or 537,152 families were directly affected by the typhoon. Approximately 200,000 dwellings were damaged, including roughly 39,000 that were destroyed. Furthermore, 208 people were hurt. The Philippine Red Cross reported that 207 people died on land in the Philippines, which was slightly lower than the agency's earlier reports suggesting a death toll of 233. Nationwide, damage to infrastructure totaled $228 million (1988 USD) and damage to agriculture totaled $40 million. (Note: All Philippine currencies are converted to United States Dollars using Philippines Measuring worth with an exchange rate of the year 1988.) Across the Philippines, damage totaled $268 million.

=== Elsewhere ===
Aided by the monsoon trough, the outer rainbands of Typhoon Ruby brought an extended period of heavy rains across eastern Taiwan. According to press reports, one person was killed and another was initially reported as missing. River levels rose drastically, which led to flooding along low-lying areas. High seas associated with the outer rainbands of the storm were responsible for $9.89 million in destruction to the Fujian Province.

On the afternoon of October 27, Ruby struck the island of Hainan as a tropical storm, killing two people and injuring 15 others. Heavy rains resulted in flash floods. Telephone service in the eastern and southern parts of the island was disrupted and about 73,000 ha (180,385 acres) of crops were damaged, primarily rice. Flooding occurred in 46 villages, and more than 10,000 residents necessitated evacuation. Island-wide, over 20,000 people were rendered homeless and at least 20 fishing vessels sunk. Damage totaled $35.6 million. (Note: All Chinese currencies are converted to United States Dollars using Chinese Measuring worth with an exchange rate of the year 1988.)

Near Hong Kong, Ruby brought strong winds, gusting to 121 km/h (75 mph) on Cheung Chau. Rainfall totaled 17.7 mm (0.70 in) from October 26 to October 31 at Hong Kong's Royal Observatory (HKO), a bit lower than the 33.7 mm (1.33 in) measured in Sai Kung, which was the highest recorded total in the vicinity of Hong Kong. HKO also reported a minimum pressure of 1,001.4 mbar (29.57 inHg), the lowest pressure recorded within the area. Citywide, damage was minimal. A large billboard in the western portion of Hong Kong was blown loose, briefly delaying nearby tram service. Four people were injured when billboards close to a construction site were toppled in Kwun Tong. Several shops near Sha Tin were flooded. Twenty dwellings remained flooded on the Tai O island for three days due to storm surge. A tree in Wong Tai Sin toppled, blocking a road.

== Aftermath ==
A state of emergency was activated in Cagayan de Oro on October 24. In Marikina, military helicopters rescued families trapped in trees for several days following the typhoon. On October 25, Philippine President Corazon Aquino made a surprise visit to a refugee center in Marikina to comfort the typhoon victims and to allocate $500,000 in calamity aid. In the city, the armed forces launched a rescue operation for stranded residents via naval tanks and helicopters. Aquino also declared a state of "calamity" in Manila and 35 provinces, which included seven of the 13 regions of the nation. Additionally, many schools across the devastated area were used as post-storm evacuation centers.

Several nations aided the devastated archipelago. Australia provided $82,000, the United States of America donated $25,000, West Germany contributed nearly $40,000, Japan donated $33,834, Canada provided $41,320 in relief, Denmark contributed $146,198, and Norway added $30,303. In addition to revenue, the Department of Social Welfare and Development provided over 3 million bottles of antibiotics. The United Nations Office for the Coordination of Humanitarian Affairs awarded a $25,000 emergency cash grant for the purchase of medicines, canned food, and clothing to the country. The United Nations Development Programme granted $50,000 worth of medicines, canned food, clothing, blankets, and cooking utensils. In addition, the UNICEF acquired $55,000 worth of medicine to the island chain. The United States federal government donated 13,000 packages of relief goods. The League of Red Cross Societies donated 4,000 bags of rice, 2,500 containers of milk (combined worth $158,000), as well as more than $250,000 in monetary contributions. Italy airlifted 3,000 blanket, 30 tents, and 10,000 plastic folding water containers. The Catholic Relief Services donated $20,000 while the Church World Service contributed $15,000 in cash for blankets. The Red Cross USSR gave $83,333 in medicine.

Aquino also ordered an investigation into the Doña Marilyn sinking. Many relatives of passengers flocked into the Manila office of Sulpicio Lines, the owner of the Marilyn, for an explanation on why the vessel left despite the typhoon, and accused management of profiteering at the expense of the safety of the passengers. Jose Baldicanas, the nation's Transportation Undersecretary, said the ship was given a permit to sail because the weather was clear when it left for Tacloban. However, Philip Tuazon, administrator of the government's Maritime Industry Authority, ordered the company in court to explain why they should not lose their license for the accident; On October 28, a four-man Senate committee headed by Senator John Osmena blamed the tragedy on the ship's captain, the Coast Guard, and the Philippine Weather Bureau for permitting the Marilyn to sail from Manila. Sulpicio Lines also denied claims from victims of under counting the number of passengers on board.

On November 2, following an investigation, President Corazon Aquino ordered Sulpicio Lines temporarily closed while the government was asked to inspect the company's crews and ships. Company officials felt that the indefinite closing was unfair and argued it would disrupt shipping across the island nation, and that the inspection can take place without shutting the entire company down. Typhoon Ruby was the first of three tropical cyclones to affect the island chain in a span of a mere two weeks; Ruby was followed by Tropical Storm Tess and Typhoon Skip in early November 1988.

== In popular culture ==
The typhoon is featured on the 12th episode of the GRB Entertainment-produced television documentary series, airing on Discovery Channel and other television stations around the world, titled Storm Warning! in 1997 and the 2010 television special produced by GMA News and Public Affairs during its 50th anniversary titled Limang Dekada: The GMA News 50th Anniversary Special.

== See also ==
- Typhoon Patsy (1970)
- Typhoon Angela (1995)
- Typhoon Zeb (1998)
- Typhoon Babs (1998)
- Typhoon Ketsana (2009)
- Typhoon Rammasun (2014)
- Typhoon Vamco (2020)
- Typhoon Noru (2022)
- Typhoon Man-yi (2024)
- Typhoon Fung-wong (2025)
