= List of man-made disasters in the Philippines =

This is a list of man-made disasters in the Philippines. It only contains acts that were not deliberately perpetrated and involved significant damage or loss of life.

== Air disasters ==
- May 18, 1947 – Lili Marlene, a Douglas C-47 Skytrain crashed in Mount Makaturing near Dansalan, Lanao, killing Col. Edwin Andrews, head of the Philippine Army Air Corps (PAAC, later the Philippine Air Force) and 17 others on board, including government officials.
- March 17, 1957 – 1957 Cebu Douglas C-47 crash. A C-47 Skytrain transport aircraft flying from Cebu to Manila crashed on the slopes of Mount Manunggal in Balamban, Cebu. The crash killed 25 of the aircraft's 26 occupants, including President Ramon Magsaysay. Several government officials, military officers, and journalists also died. The sole survivor was a reporter for the Philippine Herald, Nestor Mata.
- November 23, 1960 – Philippine Air Lines Flight S26. A Douglas DC-3 flying from Mandurriao Airport in Iloilo to Manila International Airport crashed into Mount Baco in Mindoro, killing all 33 on board.
- September 12, 1969 – Philippine Air Lines Flight 158. A BAC One-Eleven flying from Mactan–Cebu International Airport to Manila, struck a mango tree on a hill in Antipolo while on final approach. Of the 42 passengers and five crew members on board, only one passenger and one flight attendant survived.
- April 21, 1970 – Philippine Airlines Flight 215. A Hawker Siddeley HS-748-209 Srs. 2 flying from Cauayan Airport to Manila crashed near Cabanatuan, Nueva Ecija after an explosion in the lavatory, killing all 36 on board.
- October 21, 1977 – A US Marine Corps helicopter crashed during a military exercise in Mindoro, killing 24 servicemen.
- February 26, 1981 – A US Air Force C-130 plane crashed into the South China Sea, near Subic Bay Naval Base, killing 23 of 24 American, Philippine, Australian, and New Zealand military personnel aboard.
- June 26, 1987 – Philippine Airlines Flight 206. A Hawker Siddeley HS 748 flying from Manila to Loakan Airport, Baguio crashed into Mount Ugu, located between Itogon, Benguet and Kayapa, Nueva Vizcaya, killing all 50 people on board.
- December 19, 1987 – Philippine Airlines Flight 443. All 15 people aboard a Short 360-300 flying from Cebu to Iligan-Maria Cristina Airport died when it crashed into Mount Gurain in Balindong, Lanao del Sur.
- May 11, 1990 – Philippine Airlines Flight 143. A Boeing 737–300 flying from Ninoy Aquino International Airport (NAIA) to Iloilo City suffered an explosion in the central fuel tank and was consumed by fire in four minutes. 8 people on board died.
- May 18, 1990 – Aerolift Philippines Flight 075. A Beechcraft 1900 flying from NAIA to Surigao Airport crashed just after takeoff, killing all 19 passengers and 2 crew, as well as a family of four on the ground.
- October 27, 1993 – A Beechcraft 1900 flying from NAIA to Virac Airport crashed in Mauban, Quezon, killing all five on board.
- February 4, 1994 – A Grumman American AA-5 flying from Awang Airport to Lebak, Sultan Kudarat crashed off the coast of Cotabato City, killing all six on board.
- July 26, 1994 – A Piper PA-23 flying from Palanan Airport to Cauayan Airport crashed into Mount Divilacan, killing all four on board.
- February 2, 1998 – Cebu Pacific Flight 387. A McDonnell Douglas DC-9-32 flying from NAIA to Lumbia Airport in Cagayan de Oro crashed on the slopes of Mount Sumagaya in Gingoog, Misamis Oriental. The incident resulted in the deaths of all 104 passengers and crew on board.
- March 22, 1998 – Philippine Airlines Flight 137. An Airbus A320-214 overshot the runway while landing at Bacolod City Domestic Airport. There were no fatalities among the crew and passengers, but three people died on the ground as the plane plowed through a residential area.
- December 7, 1999 – Asian Spirit Flight 100. A Let L-410 Turbolet flying from NAIA to Cauayan, Isabela crashed into a mountain between Kasibu, Nueva Vizcaya and Cabarroguis, Quirino. All fifteen passengers and two crew died.
- April 19, 2000 – Air Philippines Flight 541. A Boeing 737-2H4 flying from NAIA to Francisco Bangoy International Airport in Davao City crashed in Samal, Davao del Norte while on final approach, killing all 124 passengers and 7 crew members.
- November 11, 2002 – Laoag International Airlines Flight 585. A Fokker F-27 Friendship flying from NAIA to Basco, Batanes crashed into Manila Bay shortly after takeoff. Of the 34 passengers and crew on board, 19 died.
- April 2, 2009 – A light passenger plane crashed into the Sierra Madre Mountains in Baggao, Cagayan, killing all seven on board. The wreckage was found on April 14.
- May 17, 2010 – A Robinson R44 helicopter carrying Quezon Province Governor Rafael Nantes crashed into a residential area of Lucena, Quezon, killing all four people on board and two people on the ground.
- December 10, 2011 – 2011 Manila Beechcraft Queen Air crash. A twin-engine Beechcraft Queen Air light aircraft crashed into a slum and burst into flames in Parañaque, killing all three people on board and eleven on the ground. Twenty more people on the ground were injured.
- August 18, 2012 – 2012 Masbate Piper Seneca crash. A Piper PA-34 Seneca light aircraft with four people on board, including Interior Secretary Jesse Robredo, crashed in the sea near Masbate, while flying from Lapu-Lapu City to Naga, Camarines Sur. Robredo and two other occupants were killed in the accident.
- March 17, 2018 – 2018 Philippines Piper PA-23 crash. A Piper PA-23 Apache crashed into a residential area in Plaridel, Bulacan, killing all five people (three passengers and two pilots) on board and five others on the ground.
- September 1, 2019 – 2019 Calamba Beechcraft King Air crash. A Beechcraft King Air 350 crashed into a resort in Calamba, Laguna, while on a medevac flight from Dipolog to Manila. All nine occupants aboard were killed.
- July 4, 2021 – 2021 Philippine Air Force C-130 crash. A Lockheed C-130 Hercules of the Philippine Air Force (PAF) crashed after an attempted landing at Jolo Airport in Sulu. 53 died, of which 50 people were on the aircraft and 3 on the ground.
- January 24, 2023 – A Cessna 206 crashed into the Sierra Madre Mountains in Divilacan, Isabela, killing all six on board. The wreckage was found on March 9.

== Traffic collisions and land transportation disasters ==
- September 2, 1954 – Fabrica train crash. A timber train carrying more than 100 passengers derailed and multiple wagons fell off a bridge in the village of Fabrica in Sagay, Negros Occidental. At least 82 people were killed.
- January 6, 1967 – 1967 Cavite bus crash. Two Catholic pilgrimage buses plunged off a cliff near a reinforced timber bridge in Indang after colliding with each other on a mountainous road, killing more than 80 people.
- June 6, 1969 – A bus navigating a sharp descending curve on a narrow mountain road near Baler, Quezon, plunged into a ravine and burst into flames. 40 people were killed and 32 were injured.
- April 30, 1976 – At least 28 persons were killed in a bus crash near Manila.
- September 5, 1977 – Sixteen persons were killed and 24 others were injured when two speeding trucks crashed into a bus.
- December 20, 1979 – A bus plunged into a river in Isabela, killing at least 50 people.
- May 23, 1986 – A bus fell off a cliff and exploded in Hamtic, Antique, killing 23 people and injuring 15.
- January 3, 1995 – An overloaded bus missed a bridge and fell off a ravine in Echague, Isabela, killing at least 31 people and injuring 36.
- September 22, 1997 – A Philippine National Railways train going from Calamba, Laguna and Carmona, Cavite to Caloocan saw three of its cars break away and collide with another train behind it in Barangay Buli, Muntinlupa, killing 11 passengers and injuring more than 200 others.
- October 5, 1997 – A cargo truck collided into a mini-bus in Tampilisan, Zamboanga del Norte, killing 25 people.
- January 21, 1999 – A bus fell into a ravine after overshooting a sharp curve on Naguilian Road in Sablan, Benguet, killing 22 people.
- October 31, 1999 – An overloaded jeepney plunged into a ravine in Itogon, Benguet, killing 21 passengers out of 34 people on board.
- November 4, 1999 – A bus fell into a ravine in Atok, Benguet, killing 19 people.
- December 25, 2000 – A speeding bus was rear-ended and driven off a 13-meter embankment by another bus in Bansalan, Davao del Sur, killing 38.
- March 19, 2001 – A speeding diesel tanker crashed into five vehicles before bursting into flames in Parañaque, killing 14 and injuring three.
- March 19, 2001 – A cargo truck collided with a bus along the North Luzon Expressway in Bocaue, Bulacan, killing 12 and injuring 12.
- October 26, 2001 – A bus hit a house crowded with mourners in Buenavista, Agusan del Norte, killing 21 and injuring six.
- February 2, 2002 – A bus plunged off a ravine in Bokod, Benguet, killing 12 passengers and injuring several others.
- April 26, 2002 – A collision between a jeepney and a bus in Bambang, Nueva Vizcaya killed 11 and injured six.
- August 10, 2002 – A van smashed into a speeding 10-wheeler cargo truck in Liloy, Zamboanga del Norte, killing 11 and injuring two.
- November 24, 2002 – A bus fell 30–40 feet into a creek in Tagkawayan, Quezon, killing 33 and injuring six.
- April 27, 2003 – A jeep smashed into an oncoming bus on a mountain road in Tagkawayan, Quezon causing the bus to plunge into a ravine, killing 11 people and injuring 31.
- September 22, 2003 – A bus collided with another bus and a van before plunging into a ravine in Gattaran, Cagayan, killing 14.
- September 27, 2003 – A minibus ploughed into a waiting shed in Mariveles, Bataan killing 14.
- November 15, 2003 – A jeepney rammed a stalled truck in Silay, Negros Occidental, killing 15.
- January 31, 2004 – Two buses collided in Botolan, Zambales, killing 10.
- April 2, 2005 – A bus collided with a jeepney in San Fabian, Pangasinan, killing 18.
- May 22, 2005 – A bus slammed into a roadside boulder in Tuba, Benguet, killing 27.
- May 11, 2006 – A van collided with a bus in Panabo, Davao del Norte, killing 11.
- October 28, 2006 – A dump truck lost its brakes while maneuvering a downhill curve, causing it to smash into several vehicles before plowing through villagers celebrating a religious feast in Makilala, Cotabato, killing 18.
- February 2, 2007 – A burning chemical truck exploded just as a bus was passing beside it in Tigbao, Zamboanga del Sur, killing over 50.
- July 22, 2007 – A truck collided with a motorcycle in Calbayog, Samar, killing 13 and injuring 30.
- January 29, 2008 – A packed van collided head-on with a truck loaded with cement bags on a narrow highway in Carmen, Cotabato, killing 14 and injuring 20.
- July 29, 2008 – Two buses collided head-on in Pamplona, Camarines Sur, killing 13 people and injuring 30 others.
- August 27, 2008 – A van carrying South Korean tourists crashed into a concrete wall in Bolinao, Pangasinan, killing ten passengers.
- March 28, 2009 – A bus collided with a 10-wheeler hauler truck in Naga, Cebu, killing 14.
- October 8, 2009 – A multicab and a truck collided in Nabunturan, Compostela Valley, killing 11 and injuring seven.
- October 28, 2009 – A bus fell into an 80-foot ravine after colliding with two other vehicles on a bridge in Cauayan, Isabela, killing ten and injuring 21.
- February 15, 2010 – A 30-seater jeepney and a trailer truck collided in Piat, Cagayan, killing 14 and injuring 13.
- March 7, 2010 – A bus lost its brakes before slamming into a tree in Pugo, La Union, killing 12.
- June 13, 2010 – 2010 Balamban, Cebu bus accident. 21 passengers, most of them Iranian students, died when their bus fell off a 30-foot ravine.
- July 3, 2010 – A bus lost its brakes and rammed a concrete wall in Toledo, Cebu, killing 15.
- August 18, 2010 – A bus lost its brakes before falling into a 30 m (98 ft) ravine in Sablan, Benguet, killing 41.
- December 1, 2011 – A van slammed into a parked cargo truck in Malungon, Sarangani, killing 13 and injuring five.
- May 13, 2012 – A jeepney plunged into a ravine in Bontoc, Mountain Province, killing 11.
- July 21, 2012 – A dump truck lost its brakes and fell sideways near Caibiran, Biliran, killing 14 and injuring 10.
- October 2, 2012 – A 14-wheeler truck rammed a jeep in Sarrat, Ilocos Norte, killing 13.
- October 19, 2013 – 2013 Atimonan road crash. Three buses and four trucks collided in Quezon; 20 were killed and 54 injured.
- December 16, 2013 – 2013 Metro Manila Skyway bus accident. A bus fell off the Metro Manila Skyway in Parañaque, killing 18 and injuring 20.
- February 7, 2014 – 2014 Mountain Province bus accident. 17 passengers killed when their bus fell off a 150-meter ravine in Bontoc.
- February 20, 2017 – 2017 Tanay bus accident. A tourist bus carrying more than 50 passengers lost control and hit a power pole in Tanay, Rizal, killing 15 people and injuring 40.
- April 18, 2017 – 2017 Nueva Ecija bus accident. A 45-seater bus carrying 77 passengers fell into a ravine in Carranglan, killing 31 and injuring 46.
- December 25, 2017 – 20 passengers were killed after their jeep collided with a bus in Agoo, La Union.
- March 20, 2018 – 19 passengers died after a bus careened off a winding dirt road and fell into a ravine in Sablayan, Occidental Mindoro.
- September 11, 2018 – A jeepney fell into a ravine in Balbalan, Kalinga, killing 14.
- May 21, 2019 – 10 persons died while 20 others were injured after a jeep rolled over in Libon, Albay.
- June 8, 2019 – 13 persons died while 41 others were injured a jeep fell into a ravine in San Fernando, Camarines Sur.
- September 17, 2019 – A truck fell down a ravine in T'Boli, South Cotabato, killing 20 people and injuring 12.
- October 31, 2019 – 19 people were killed and 21 others were injured after a truck they rented fell into a ravine in Conner, Apayao.
- January 12, 2022 – At least 11 people were killed after a small truck packed with partygoers, including children, overturned in Balingasag, Misamis Oriental.
- August 4, 2022 – 10 died in a collision involving a ten-wheeler hauler truck, a van fully loaded with passengers, and a pick-up truck in General Santos.
- December 5, 2023 – A bus fell into a ravine in Hamtic, Antique, killing 18 passengers and injuring ten.
- February 21, 2024 – A truck loaded with passengers fell into a ravine in Mabinay, Negros Oriental, killing 15 people and injuring two.
- March 25, 2024 – A van collided with a truck and caught fire in Antipas, Cotabato, killing 17 people and injuring four.
- July 10, 2024 – A bus collided with a pickup truck in Abulug, Cagayan, killing at least 11 people and injuring five others.
- May 1, 2025 – A bus slammed into a van queuing at the Tarlac City toll plaza of the Subic–Clark–Tarlac Expressway, causing a chain collision involving three other vehicles that killed 10 people and injured 37 others.
- July 19, 2025 – A collision between two passenger vans, both with Baguio–Kalinga route, and a six-wheeler truck along the national highway in Aurora, Isabela, killed nine people and injured several others.
- August 6, 2025 – A mini-dump truck, carrying 25 residents of Sultan Kudarat, Maguindanao del Norte, and en route to Cotabato City, plunged into a ravine in Lebak, Sultan Kudarat, near the boundary with South Upi, Maguindanao del Sur, killing 12 people and injuring 13 others.
- November 26, 2025 – A truck collided with a van in Camalig, Albay, killing 11 people and injuring four.

== Fires and explosions ==
- May 23, 1957 – A massive fire in Iligan killed two people, destroyed 165 buildings, and displaced 25,000 residents.
- May 19, 1961 – A massive fire in Divisoria, Manila caused damages of up to P150 million and displaced 1,500 families.
- February 7, 1966 – 1966 Iloilo City fire. A massive fire destroyed nearly three quarters of the central business district of Iloilo City.
- January 22, 1971 – 13 people were killed in a fire that gutted the terminal of the Manila International Airport.
- January 22, 1975 – 51 people were killed after a fire swept through a factory in a commercial building in Marikina, Rizal.
- November 14, 1977 –45 people were killed in a fire that broke out at the Filipinas Hotel in Manila.
- December 16, 1977 – 32 patients were killed by a fire in the National Mental Hospital in Mandaluyong.
- January 3, 1978 – 11 worshipers died after a fire broke out in a Buddhist temple in Manila.
- July 9, 1978 – At least 11 persons were killed after a fire broke out in a theater complex in Manila.
- March 29, 1979 – A fire in a discothèque and massage parlor in Manila killed 15 people.
- February 6, 1983 – Fifteen workers died in a coal mine explosion in Danao, Cebu caused by a cigarette.
- October 25, 1984 – An arson attack on the Pines Hotel in Baguio killed 25 people, including eight Americans.
- February 13, 1985 – A suspected arson attack at the Regent of Manila Hotel by the escaped suspect in the Pines Hotel fire killed 27 people.
- August 29, 1994 – 119 people were killed in an explosion at a coal mine operated by the Philippine National Oil Company in Malangas, Zamboanga del Sur.
- March 18, 1996 – Ozone Disco fire. 162 people, mostly students celebrating the end of the academic term, died in a nightclub fire in Quezon City.
- April 26, 1997 – A fire caused by arson gutted the Imperial Hotel in Cotabato City, killing 24 people and injuring 12.
- May 16, 1998 – A fire gutted the Lung Center of the Philippines and the adjacent National Kidney and Transplant Institute in Quezon City, killing 22 patients in the first hospital.
- December 3, 1998 – A fire devastated the Bahay Kalinga orphanage, run by women's organization Asociacion de Damas de Filipinas Inc., in Paco, Manila, with at least 30 people confirmed dead, mostly children who admitted there.
- February 28, 2000 – An explosion at a gold mine at Mount Diwata in Monkayo, Compostela Valley killed 11 miners.
- August 18, 2001 – Manor Hotel fire. 74 people died in a hotel fire in Quezon City.
- October 26, 2005 – An explosion occurred inside a gold mine tunnel in Mount Diwata, killing at least 32 people, with five others missing and feared dead.
- October 19, 2007 – 2007 Glorietta explosion. Eleven people died and hundreds more injured after an explosion inside the Glorietta shopping complex at Ayala Center in Makati. Police claimed it was caused by a gas explosion, through suspicions linger on whether it was a bomb attack.
- December 31, 2007 – 2007 Bocaue fire. About 20 fireworks stalls caught fire and exploded, injuring at least three people.
- December 19, 2010 – A fire at a pension house in Tuguegarao, Cagayan, killed 16.
- May 31, 2013 – 2013 Serendra explosion. A gas leak led to an explosion inside a condominium complex in Bonifacio Global City, Taguig that hurled a chunk of concrete wall into a road, killing three passengers of a passing delivery van and injuring five others.
- May 13, 2015 – Kentex slipper factory fire. Seventy-four people died in a factory fire in Valenzuela.
- February 1, 2017 – HTI factory fire. 5 people died after a factory fire inside the Cavite Export Processing Zone in General Trias.
- December 23, 2017 – 2017 Davao City mall fire. Thirty-nine people died in a fire that destroyed the New City Commercial Center (NCCC) shopping mall.
- March 18, 2018 – 2018 Manila Pavilion Hotel fire. Six people died in a hotel fire in the Ermita district of Manila.
- October 2, 2019 – Star City fire. An electrical fire razed the Star City amusement park and the adjacent Manila Broadcasting Company building in Pasay.
- May 21–23, 2023 – The Manila Central Post Office was gutted by a fire that started from a leaking car battery.
- August 31, 2023 – A fire at a house doubling as a t-shirt factory in Quezon City killed 15.
- August 2, 2024 – A fire at a commercial-residential building in Binondo, Manila killed 11.

== Structural and infrastructure failures ==
- December 13, 1952 – A cave-in at a mine in Paracale, Camarines Norte caused by waters entering from the Paracale River killed 56 miners.
- November 17, 1981 – During the construction of the Manila Film Center, the scaffolding collapsed, and at least 169 workers fell and were buried under quick-drying wet cement. Seven people were officially listed as having been killed in the accident. However, it was believed that many more were killed and several bodies were not recovered, having been poured over with cement to rush with the construction and as part of a media blackout during the Marcos dictatorship.
- June 4, 1988 – Mine tunnels collapsed on Mount Lablab, Sibutad, Zamboanga del Norte, killing at least 27 people.
- May 30, 1989 – A mining community in Mount Diwata, Monkayo, then part of Davao del Norte, collapsed from heavy rain, resulting in the deaths of thousands, mostly miners.
- May 15, 1996 – The roof of a Coca-Cola plant that was under construction in Santa Rosa, Laguna collapsed, killing seven workers and injuring 20.
- December 26, 1997 – Heavy rains caused the collapse of the gold mine tunnels in Mount Diwata, killing 80 miners.
- January 19, 2015 – Eleven people were killed while four others were injured after a wall collapsed at a construction site in Guiguinto, Bulacan.
- May 24, 2026 – Thirty people were killed after a a nine-story building under construction collapsed in Angeles City.

== Environmental disasters ==
- January 2, 1992 – The tailings dam broke at Number Two tailings storage facility of Philex Mining Corporation's Padcal mine in Tuba, Benguet, releasing 80 million cubic metres of effluent.
- September 6, 1995 – Apparent explosions caused by "treasure-hunting" activities triggered the collapse of the crater wall of Mt. Parker in T'boli, South Cotabato, overflowing Lake Maughan atop, and devastating mostly tribal communities. At least 70 people were reported killed while 125 were missing, with damages worth ₱346-million.
- March 24, 1996 – Marcopper mining disaster. A fracture in the drainage tunnel of a large pit containing leftover mine tailings belonging to a Canadian firm led to a discharge of toxic mine waste into the Makulapnit-Boac river system in Marinduque, causing flash flooding, extensive contamination, adverse health effects and the biological death of the river system.
- August–September 1999 – Sixty-eight residents mysteriously died in Clark, Pampanga. A task force found out that the deaths were caused by tons of toxic waste abandoned in the former US air base.
- July 10, 2000 – Payatas landslide. More than 200 people died when a large volume of garbage stored at the Payatas Dumpsite in Quezon City collapsed into nearby settlements.
- August 11, 2006 – Guimaras oil spill. An oil tanker, MT Solar 1, sank off the coasts of Guimaras and Negros Occidental, causing some 500,000 litres (110,000 imp gal; 130,000 US gal) of oil to pour into Panay Gulf in an oil spill.
- August 2012 – Padcal tailings spills. A series of mine tailings spills from Tailings Pond 3 of the Philex Mining Corporation's Padcal mine in Tuba, Benguet, that resulted in the release of a total of 21 million tonnes of solids.
- February 28, 2023 – MT Princess Empress oil spill. An oil tanker, MT Princess Empress, sank off the coast of Oriental Mindoro, causing 900,000 litres of oil to pour into Tablas Strait in an oil spill that also affected Antique, Palawan and Batangas.
- July 25, 2024 – 2024 Manila Bay oil spill. The oil tanker MT Terra Nova, carrying around 1.5 million liters of industrial fuel, capsized and sank in 34m depth of water off Limay, Bataan during Typhoon Gaemi, causing an oil spill with a length of four kilometers along Manila Bay.
- January 8, 2026 – The Binaliw landfill in Cebu City collapsed, destroying a building used by its employees and killing 36 people.

== Miscellaneous ==
- May 2, 1994 – 166 people were hospitalized after eating meat from carabaos believed to have died in an epidemic in Jabonga, Agusan del Norte.
- August 2, 1994 – 260 students were hospitalized after eating cooked cabbage contaminated with formalin in Valencia, Bukidnon.
- March 9, 2005 – At least 28 students died and more than 100 others were hospitalized after eating cassava-based snacks believed to have been tainted with pesticide in Mabini, Bohol.
- February 4, 2006 – PhilSports Stadium stampede. 78 died in a crush at the venue of the first anniversary celebrations of ABS-CBN's variety show Wowowee in Pasig.
- July 2015 – Caraga candy poisonings. 2,000 people across the Caraga region were hospitalized after earing durian candies that were contaminated with staphylococcus aureus.

== See also ==
- List of disasters in the Philippines
- List of maritime disasters in the Philippines
