= CEZ =

CEZ stands for:

- Cavite Economic Zone, a freeport area in the Philippines
- one of Falconbridge Ltd.'s refineries
- a Czech news channel
- IATA airport code for Cortez Municipal Airport
- CEZ Group, a Czech energy company
- The Chernobyl Exclusion Zone
