= Dynata =

American company

- Type: Private
- Industry: Market Research
- Founded: 1977
- Headquarters: Shelton, CT, USA
- Website: www.dynata.com

Dynata LLC (formerly Survey Sampling International) is an American company that performs consumer and business-to-business survey research.

== History ==
Survey Sampling International (SSI) was founded in 1977 by Tom Danbury and Beverly Weiman. In 2005, SSI acquired Bloomerce bv, a Netherlands-based online sampling company. SSI later manged online panels under the names SurveySpot, Opinion Outpost, OpinionWorld, and Choozz.

In 2009, the firm participated in launching Research Voice, an industry co-initiative. Research Voice (www.research-voice.com) was a forum for members of the marketing research sector to discuss approaches to data collection.

In July 2011, SSI merged with Utah-based Opinionology. The newly formed sampling and data collection company continued to operate under the SSI brand.

On December 17, 2014, HGGC, a middle-market private equity firm, completed a majority investment in the parent company of SSI. Providence Equity Partners and Sterling Investment Partners retained minority stakes in the business. Under the terms of the deal, Rich Lawson, HGGC's chief executive, became chairman of SSI. Steve Young, a HGCC partner, also joined the board.

In December 2017, an SSI office in the New City Commercial Center, Davao City, Philippines was destroyed in the 2017 Davao City mall fire, resulting in the deaths of 37 employees. Eighty-three SSI employees survived. Charges were filed against SSI but were later dropped. SSI CEO Gary Laben announced that the firm would provide counseling for employees, assist with funeral arrangements, and create a fund for the victims' families.

On December 20, 2017, Survey Sampling International merged with Research Now to become Research Now SSI.

On January 15, 2019, Research Now SSI rebranded as Dynata.

In May 2024, Dynata filed for a prepackaged Chapter 11 bankruptcy reorganization to reduce its debt.

In July 2024, Dynata completed its Chapter 11 reorganization. Control of the company was transferred to an institutional investor group led by Bain Capital, BlackRock, and First Eagle Alternative Credit. Two years later in July 2026, the company launched a distressed debt exchange to further manage its debt structure.
