= 2013 Metro Manila Skyway bus accident =

2013 vehicle crash in Parañaque, Metro Manila, Philippines

2013 Manila Skyway bus accident
- Parañaque (Metro Manila) Parañaque (Luzon) Parañaque (Philippines)

Details
- Date: December 16, 2013 around 5:15 AM PST
- Location: West Service Road, Parañaque, Metro Manila
- Country: Philippines
- Operator: Don Mariano Transit Corporation
- Cause: Over speeding

Statistics
- Passengers: 42
- Deaths: 19
- Injured: 19
- Damage: 2 (a bus and a van)

The 2013 Manila Skyway bus accident occurred on December 16, 2013, between Bicutan and Sucat Exits of South Luzon Expressway in Parañaque, Metro Manila, Philippines, after a bus fell off the Skyway, crushing a delivery van and fatally wounding the van's driver. 19 people died and 19 others were injured. The Highway Patrol Group-National Capital Region-South Luzon Expressway described the incident as the worst to have happened along the Skyway.

== Accident ==
The accident occurred in the Manila suburb of Parañaque on December 16, 2013, at around 5:15 AM (PST). The bus, plying a route originating from Novaliches, Quezon City, and bound for Pacita Complex in San Pedro, Laguna, was traveling on Skyway, one of the longest flyovers in the world that runs above the South Luzon Expressway. The bus fell 6 meters (20 ft) from Skyway and crashed on top of a van that was on a service road below. Eighteen passengers of the bus were killed. The driver of the bus, Carmelo Calatcat, later died on December 23. As a result of the accident, traffic was slowed down on the highway.

The bus unit involved was a front engine variant of Almazora City Star (body #861) in Isuzu FVR platform. The van, in question, was a Mitsubishi L300 Closed Van.

== Investigation ==
The company that owned and operated the bus, Don Mariano Transit, had to suspend transit for thirty days for an investigation into the accident to be carried out. The former Department of Transportation and Communications now the Department of Transportation (Philippines) required the Land Transportation Franchising and Regulatory Board to suspend all of the 78 buses that Don Mariano Transit owned. The driver of the bus, Carmelo Calatcat, had to undergo a drug test. An audit of over 400,000 public utility buses was executed in Manila following the accident. The driver and operator of the bus faced charges by the authorities.

The Department of Labor and Employment admitted that Don Mariano Transit Corporation's Labor Standards Compliance Certificate was expired since July 2013. It was also reported that Don Mariano Transit did not pay its drivers their monthly salary.

The bus driver, Carmelo Calatcat, tested positive for drug use. Chief Superintendent Arrazad Subong of the Philippine National Police Highway Patrol group said that the drug test was irrelevant as their investigation showed that the bus a few moments before the accident occurred had worn out tires and was overspeeding. The driver faced criminal charges of reckless imprudence resulting in multiple homicide, multiple injuries and damage to property. Should he be convicted, he could have faced at least six years of imprisonment but due to the number of fatalities caused by the accident, he could have faced life imprisonment instead. However, he died before he could face trial.

== Reaction ==
Jason Cantil, legal counsel for Don Mariano Transit, said that the accident was an isolated incident. Cantil said that the tires of the bus involved may not have been inspected but claimed that all other buses of the company were in good condition.

Presidential Communications Operations Office Secretary Herminio Coloma Jr. encouraged public utility vehicles to use speed-limiting or monitoring devices. He said that such devices would help bus operators to prevent accidents similar to the Skyway accident. Coloma added that it is up to legislators to come up with a law mandating operators to install such devices to their vehicles. Coloma also reiterated the government's preference for allowing the private sector to operate public transport as it is more efficient. He said the government's role is to regulate the private sector.

The Land Transportation Franchising and Regulatory Board plans to make the installation of speed-limiting devices on public utility vehicles as a response to the accident. The Department of Labor and Employment vowed to monitor labor law compliance more strictly.

== See also ==
- 2013 Atimonan road crash
- 2023 Venice bus crash – a similar accident that occurred in Italy nearly ten years later
