= 2023 Venice bus crash =

2023 bus crash in Italy

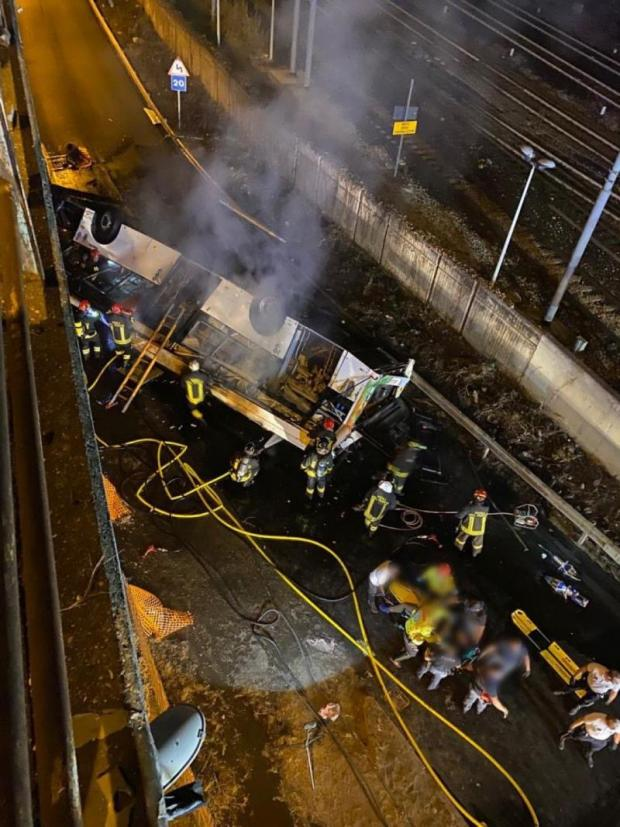
- Aftermath of the crash

Details
- Date: 3 October 2023; 19:38 CEST (UTC+02:00)
- Location: Marghera, Venice, Metropolitan City of Venice, Veneto, Italy
- Coordinates: 45°28′49″N 12°14′11″E
- Country: Italy
- Owner: La Linea Spa
- Incident type: Bus crash
- Cause: Under investigation

Statistics
- Bus: Yutong E12
- Vehicles: 1
- Passengers: 35
- Crew: 1
- Deaths: 22
- Injured: 14

On 3 October 2023, a bus crash occurred in Marghera, Venice, Italy. A coach carrying 40 passengers fell from an overpass, killing 21 people and injuring 15. The accident happened while the bus was en route from Venice's historic center to a campsite in Marghera. Witnesses reported the bus scraping along the guardrail before breaking through and falling about 15 metres (50 ft), catching fire upon impact. The flyover had been in need of repairs since 2016, with work beginning only in September 2023. One of the injured died on 4 April 2024, bringing the number of dead to 22.

== Crash ==
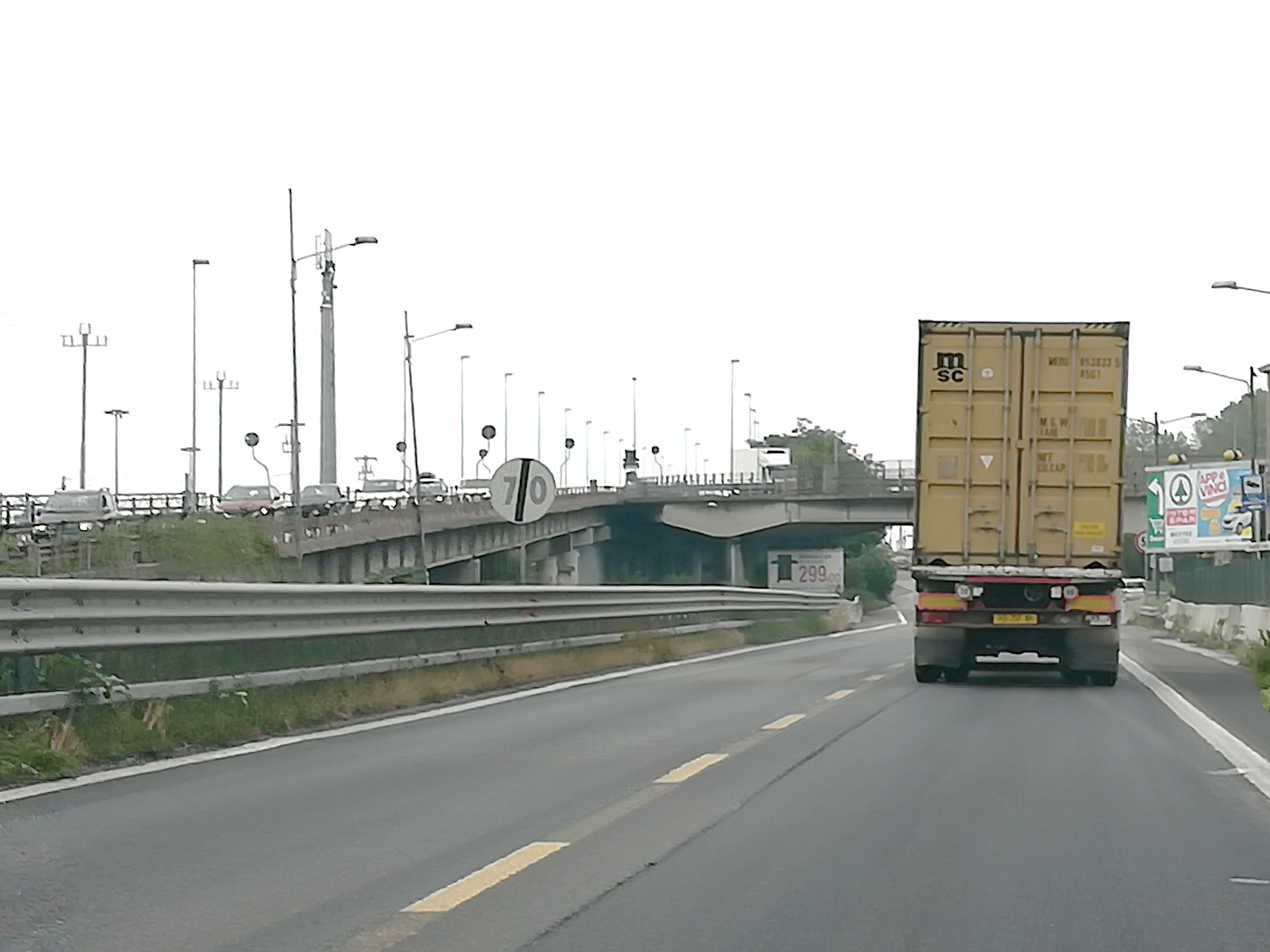
The accident site (bridge on the left)

The incident happened at 19:38 CEST as the bus was transporting tourists from Piazzale Roma in the historic centre of Venice to a campsite in the Marghera district. The bus scraped the guardrail and hit it 27 times along the downhill section of a flyover of a road leading from Mestre to Marghera and the A57 motorway for 50 metres (160 ft) before breaking through the barrier at 6 kilometres per hour (3.7 mph). The bus fell about 15 metres (49 ft), and landed upside-down with its front completely crushed near the tracks of the Venezia Mestre railway station, where it caught fire. The vehicle, a Yutong E12 model which was operated by La Linea spa (part of Ferrovie Nord Milano group) and rented by a local company to transport the passengers, weighed 13 tonnes (13 long tons; 14 short tons) and was less than a year old. The vehicle was also electrically powered, and the fire brigade commander in charge of the scene stated that the bus' batteries had caught fire.

Venice's transport councillor later confirmed that the flyover of the accident location had been in need of renovations since 2016, but repairs that were projected to cost €7 million did not begin until September 2023 due to contractor unavailability. While the work was eventually completed, the repairs fell 400 metres (1,300 ft) short of a preexisting 1.5-metre (4.9 ft) gap in the primary guardrail that the bus had penetrated, along with a secondary metal fence on the edge of the flyover.

== Casualties ==
Of the 36 people on board the bus, 21 passengers were immediately killed, while 15 others were injured, nine of them seriously. Authorities said three children were among the dead. Among the dead were nine Ukrainian citizens, a family of four Romanians, three Germans, two Portuguese, a pregnant Croatian, one South African, and the 40-year old Italian driver, who was reported to have had up to seven years of experience as a bus driver. The injured included four Ukrainians, two Spanish, one Croatian, one French, and one Austrian, as well as four minors. A 52-year-old Spanish woman, who had been hospitalized in Padua in serious conditions, died on 4 April 2024 increasing the number of dead to 22.

Nationality	Deaths	Injuries
Ukraine	9	6
Romania	4	-
Germany	3	2
Portugal	2	-
Croatia	1	1
Italy	1	-
South Africa	1	-
Spain	1	1
Austria	-	1
United Arab Emirates	-	1
France	-	1
Russia	-	1
Totals	22	14

== Aftermath ==
Passers-by and residents of a nearby apartment building were the first to attend to the scene, pulling out victims and survivors and attempting to extinguish the fire. More than 20 ambulances and the air ambulance service of Treviso later arrived, with the injured being taken to hospitals in Mestre, Mirano, Padua, and Treviso. Rescue operations lasted for about two hours after the accident. Rail services on the line near the site of the accident were temporarily suspended. The wreckage of the bus was removed early the next day.

A reception point was set up at a nearby hospital to provide psychological and psychiatric support for the victims' families.

The public prosecutor of Venice opened an investigation into the accident on 4 October, with its coverage to include the state of the flyover's guardrail, an autopsy of the driver, and a search of his phone records.

An initial autopsy conducted on the driver's body excluded any health problems, however a broken bone in a finger was found, leading to suggestion that the driver may have been desperately trying to steer and keep the bus on track. It was later discovered that, in the weeks before the accident, the driver had gone to hospital a few times complaining of chest pains: therefore, a second autopsy was ordered.

Other examinations were performed on the bus, particularly on the steering, front axle shaft, and brakes. Pictures of the overturned bus showed that the right front wheel was unnaturally bent outward.

The investigation also focused on the safety gap of the guard rail, into which the bus slid, and acting as a pivot lifted the vehicle.

In March 2024, Allianz announced its intention to pay the first compensation (300,000 euros per victim), with the Municipality of Venice then reimbursing as responsible for the bad maintenance of the road. Renato Boraso, Councillor for Mobility and Transport of the Municipality of Venice, criticised the decision of the insurance company, as the accident investigation had not yet established any liability.

== Response ==
Venice's mayor Luigi Brugnaro described the event as "apocalyptic". A state of official mourning was declared in the city. President of Veneto Luca Zaia announced that flags on official buildings across the region would be set at half-mast in remembrance of the disaster. Francesco Moraglia, the patriarch of Venice, went to the scene of the accident and blessed the dead.

Italian Prime Minister Giorgia Meloni, President Sergio Mattarella, French President Emmanuel Macron, German Foreign Minister Annalena Baerbock, Hungarian Prime Minister Viktor Orbán, European Council president Charles Michel, European Commission president Ursula von der Leyen and the King of the United Kingdom Charles III expressed their condolences and solidarity with the victims of the accident, while the Italian Senate held a moment of silence for the victims of the crash on 4 October.

== Other incidents ==
A previous incident involving the same operator and bus model, a Yutong E12, occurred on 16 June 2023, and according to the driver's statement was the result of unresponsive brakes. No casualties were reported.

On 14 October, the same model bus from the same operator crashed into a building pylon in Mestre, just a few hundred metres away from the 3 October incident. 15 people were injured, and as a result the municipality of Venice-Mestre suspended La Linea's servicing of routes on which it used electric vehicles. The 59-year-old driver reported suffering a stroke while driving the bus: the man later underwent heart surgery for a coronary obstruction.

On 14 January 2024, an inconvenience occurred in Mestre, while another electric bus of La Linea s.p.a. went off the road and onto the platform, but without any damage or serious injuries.

== See also ==
- 2021 Bulgaria bus crash
- 2013 Monteforte Irpino bus crash
- 2013 Metro Manila Skyway bus accident
