= List of disasters in the Philippines =

This is a list of disasters in the Philippines.

== Earthquakes ==
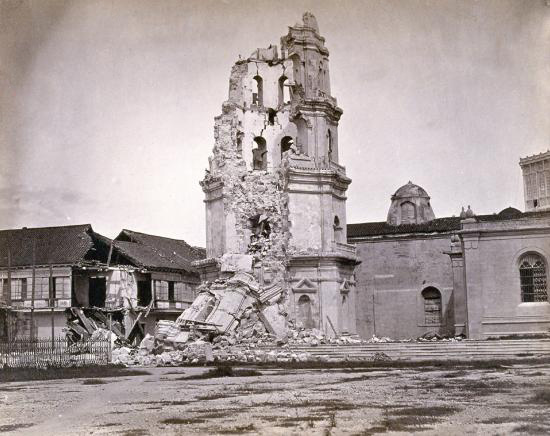
The bell tower of the Manila Cathedral after the series of destructive earthquakes of July 1880.

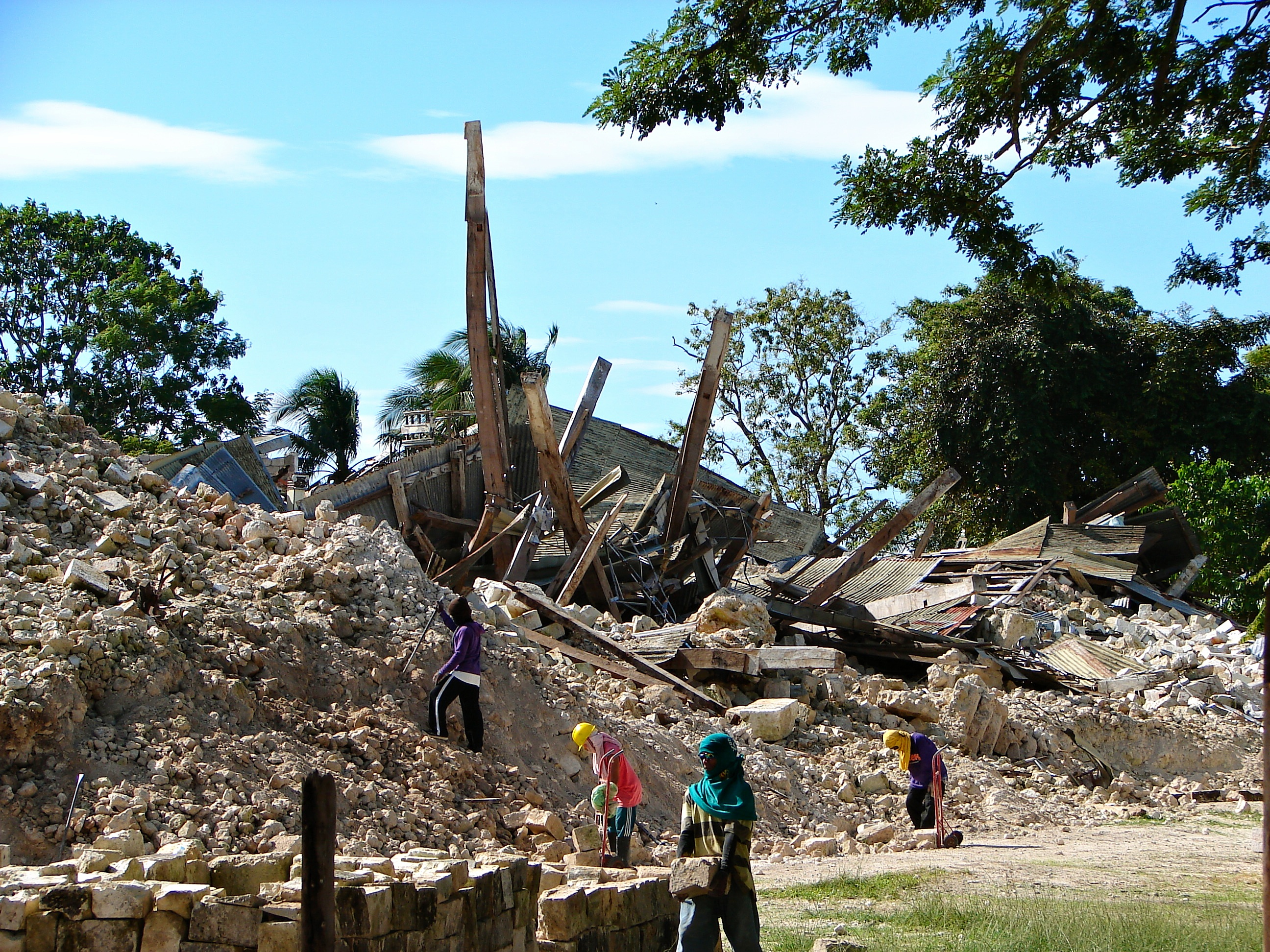
The ruins of Loon Church after the 2013 Bohol earthquake.

Ten deadliest earthquakes since the 1600s
Magnitude		Location	Date	Deaths	Missing	Injured	Damage	Source
1	8.0	Palimbang, Sultan Kudarat	August 17, 1976	4,791	2,288	9,928		
2	7.8	Rizal, Nueva Ecija	July 16, 1990	1,621	1,000	>3,000	₱ 10 billion	
3	6.4	Manila	June 3, 1863	1,000				
4	7.5	Gabaldon, Nueva Ecija	November 30, 1645	600–3,000		>3,000	Unknown	
5	8.3	Mati, Davao Oriental	April 14, 1924	~500				
6	7.4	Lapuyan, Zamboanga del Sur	April 1, 1955	465		Unknown	US$5 million	
7	7.6	Casiguran, Aurora	August 2, 1968	271		261		
8	7.2	Sagbayan, Bohol	October 15, 2013	222	8	796	₱ 4 billion (est.)	
9	6.7	Jimalalud, Negros Oriental	February 6, 2012	113		112	₱ 383 million	
10	7.8	Glan, Sarangani	June 8, 2026	106	7	1,316	₱71 billion	

== Tornadoes ==
Deadliest Philippine tornadoes
Rank	Areas	F/EF	Date	Fatalities	References
1	Manukan, Zamboanga del Norte	F2	June 12, 1990	51	
2	San Ricardo, Southern Leyte	F2	December 19, 2003	50	
3	Datu Piang, Maguindanao del Sur	F1	November 26, 1994	14	
–	Valencia, Bukidnon	– (Note: No available rating for this tornado.)	September 29, 1995	14	
–	Caibiran, Biliran	–	December 16, 2017	14	
6	Malita, Davao del Sur	F1	June 3, 1989	13	
7	Macabebe–Masantol, Pampanga	F1	June 13, 1968	12	
–	Roxas, Oriental Mindoro	–	November 20, 2004	12	
–	Liguasan Marsh	–	March 25, 2013	12	
10	Cagayan de Oro, Misamis Oriental	–	October 23, 1988	10	

== Typhoons ==
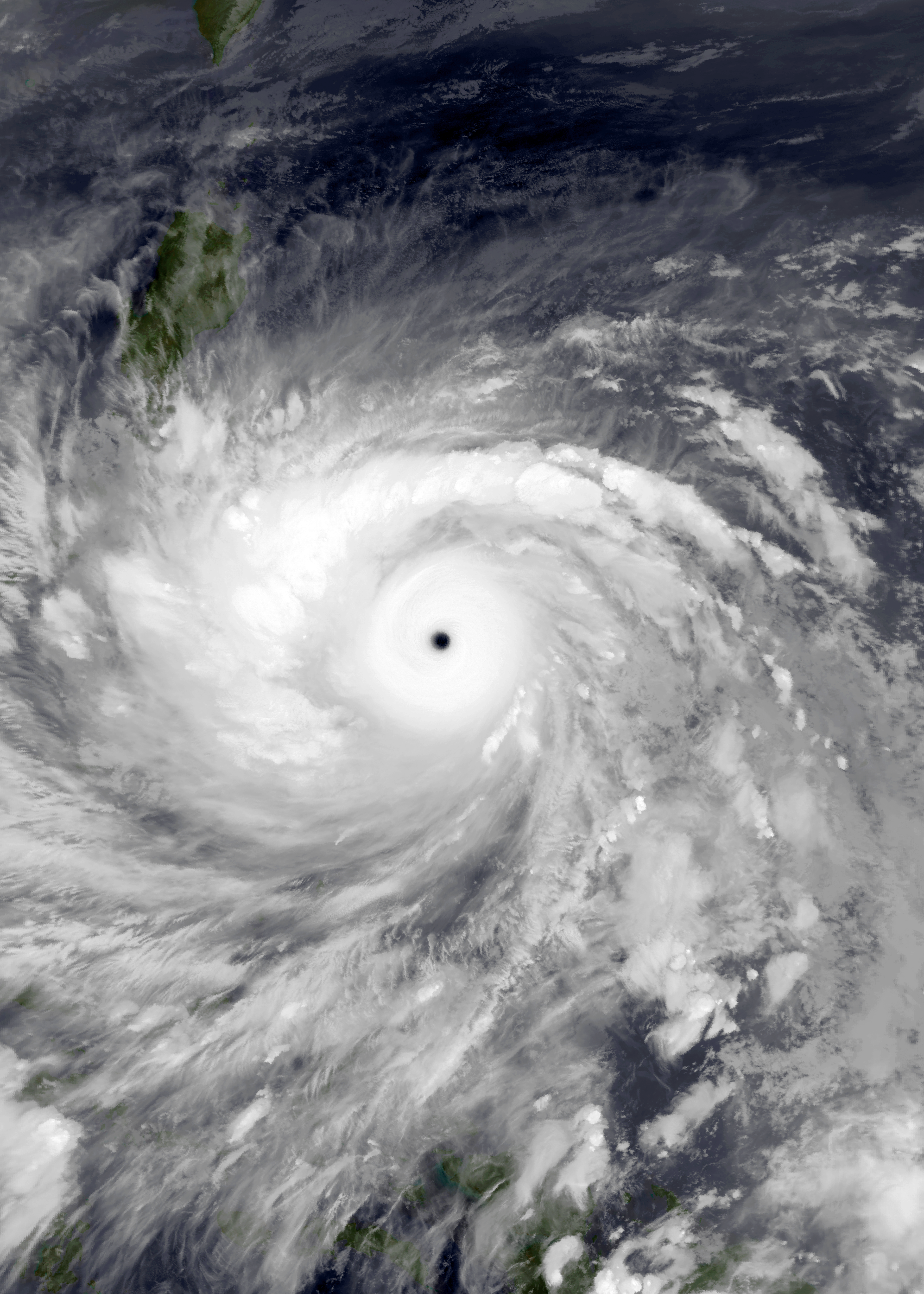
Typhoon Haiyan (Yolanda), the strongest typhoon recorded in the Philippines.

Deadliest Philippine typhoons
Rank	Storm	Season	Fatalities	Ref.
1	Yolanda (Haiyan)	2013	6,300	
2	Uring (Thelma)	1991	5,101–8,000	
3	Pablo (Bopha)	2012	1,901	
4	"Angela"	1867	1,800	
5	Winnie	2004	1,593	
6	"October 1897"	1897	1,500	
7	Nitang (Ike)	1984	1,426	
8	Reming (Durian)	2006	1,399	
9	Frank (Fengshen)	2008	1,371	(Note: The death and missing columns includes deaths caused by Typhoon Fengshen (Frank), in the MV Princess of the Stars disaster.)
10	Sendong (Washi)	2011	1,292–2,546	

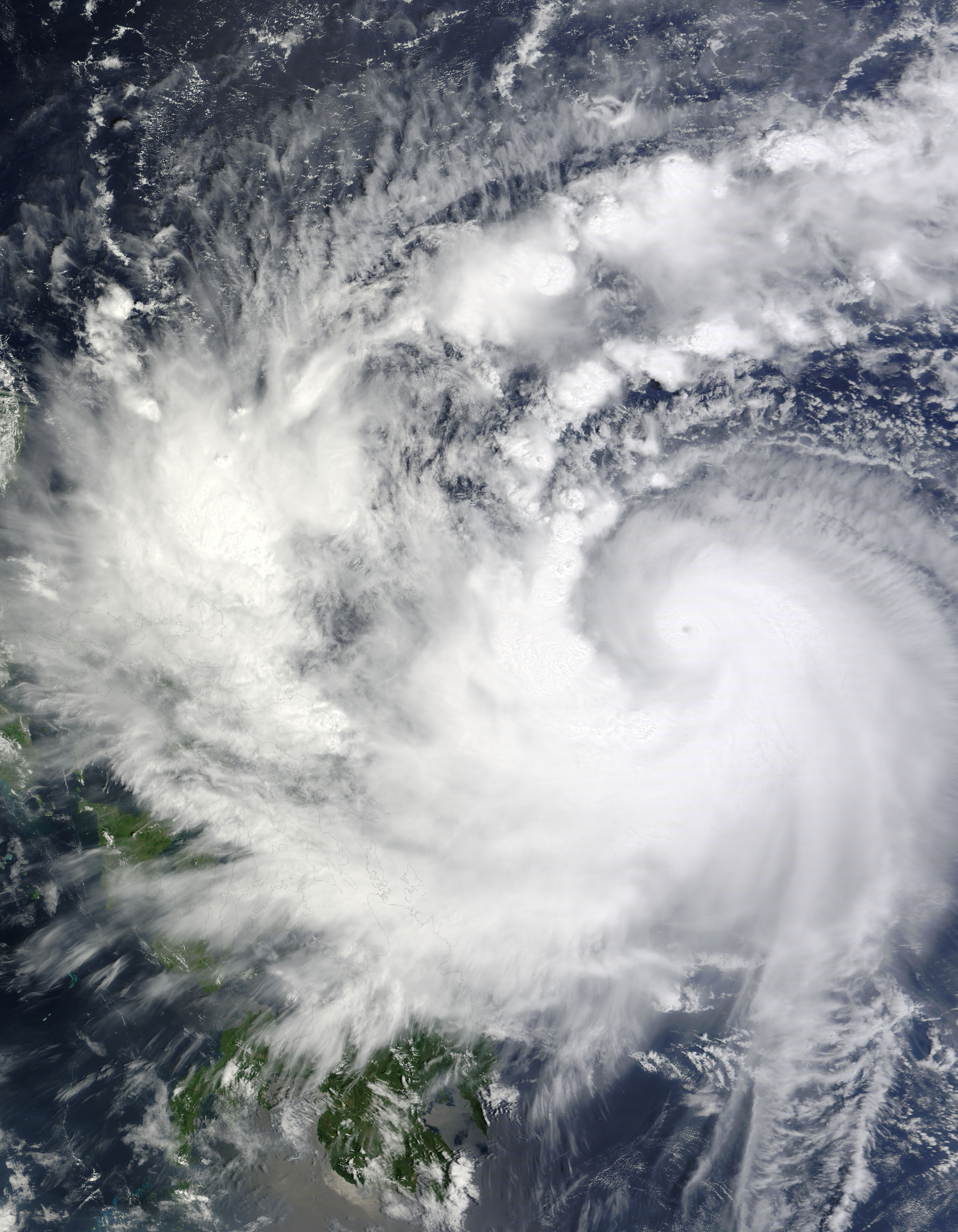
Typhoon Parma (Pepeng) near peak intensity on October 1, 2009.

Wettest tropical cyclones and their remnants in the Philippine islands Highest-known totals
Precipitation			Storm	Location	Ref.
Rank	mm	in	Storm	Location	Ref.
1	2210.0	87.01	July 1911 cyclone	Baguio	
2	1854.3	73.00	Pepeng (Parma) (2009)	Baguio	
3	1216.0	47.86	Trining (Carla) (1967)	Baguio	
4	1116.0	43.94	Iliang (Zeb) (1998)	La Trinidad, Benguet	
5	1085.8	42.74	Feria (Utor) (2001)	Baguio	
6	1077.8	42.43	Lando (Koppu) (2015)	Baguio	
7	1012.7	39.87	Igme (Mindulle) (2004)		
8	902.0	35.51	Dante (Kujira) (2009)		
9	879.9	34.64	September 1929 typhoon	Virac, Catanduanes	
10	869.6	34.24	Openg (Dinah) (1977)	Western Luzon	

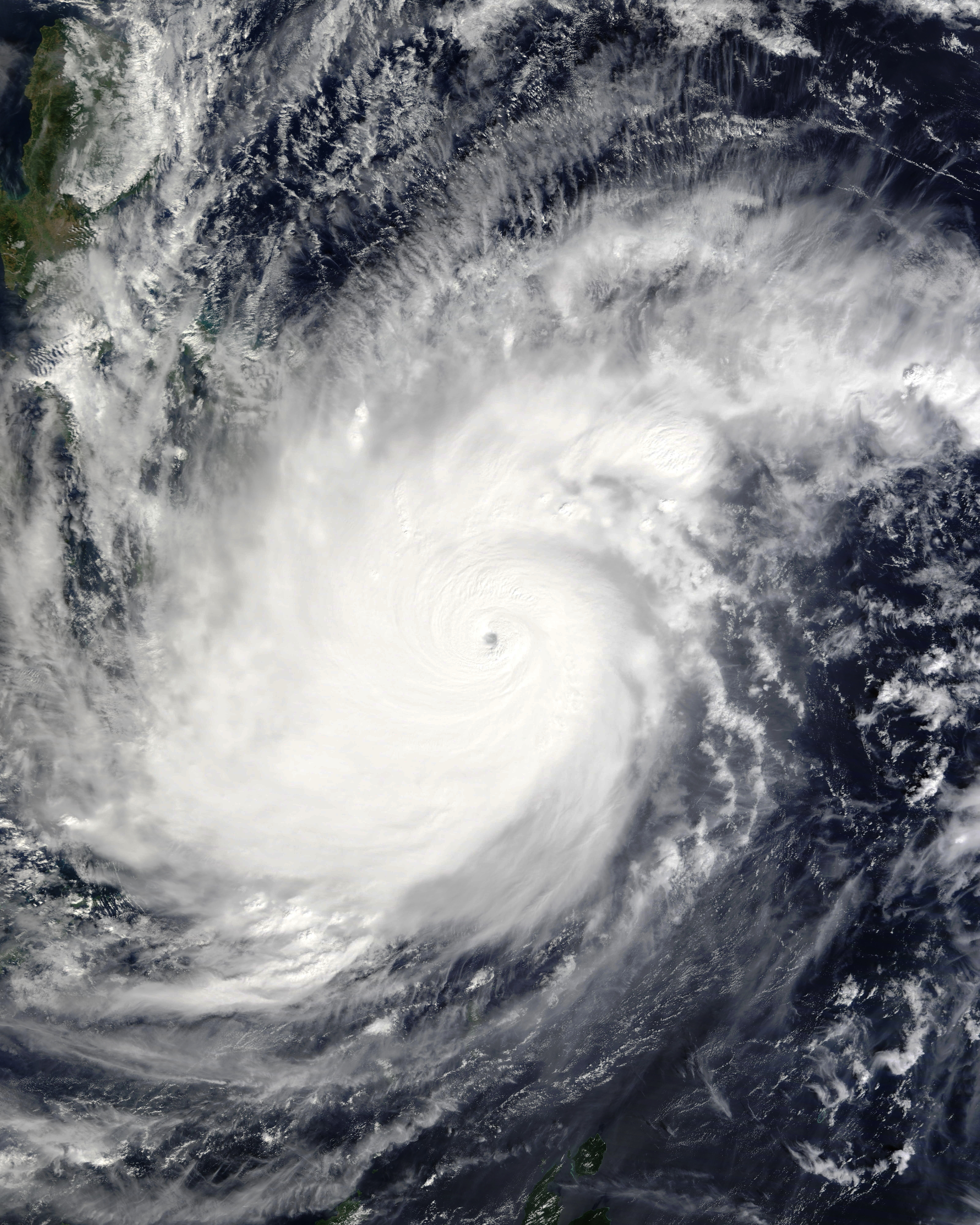
Typhoon Rai (Odette) approaching the Philippines on December 16, 2021.

Costliest Philippine typhoons
Rank	Storm	Season	Damage		Ref.
Rank	Storm	Season	PHP	USD	Ref.
1	Yolanda (Haiyan)	2013	₱95.5 billion	$2.15 billion	
2	Odette (Rai)	2021	₱51.7 billion	$1.01 billion	
3	Glenda (Rammasun)	2014	₱38.6 billion	$771 million	
4	Pablo (Bopha)	2012	₱36.9 billion	$724 million	
5	Ompong (Mangkhut)	2018	₱33.9 billion	$627 million	
6	Pepeng (Parma)	2009	₱27.3 billion	$591 million	
7	Ulysses (Vamco)	2020	₱20.2 billion	$420 million	
8	Kristine (Trami)	2024	₱18.4 billion	$373 million	
9	Rolly (Goni)	2020	₱17.9 billion	$371 million	
10	Egay (Doksuri)	2023	₱14.8 billion	$267 million	

== Volcanic eruptions ==
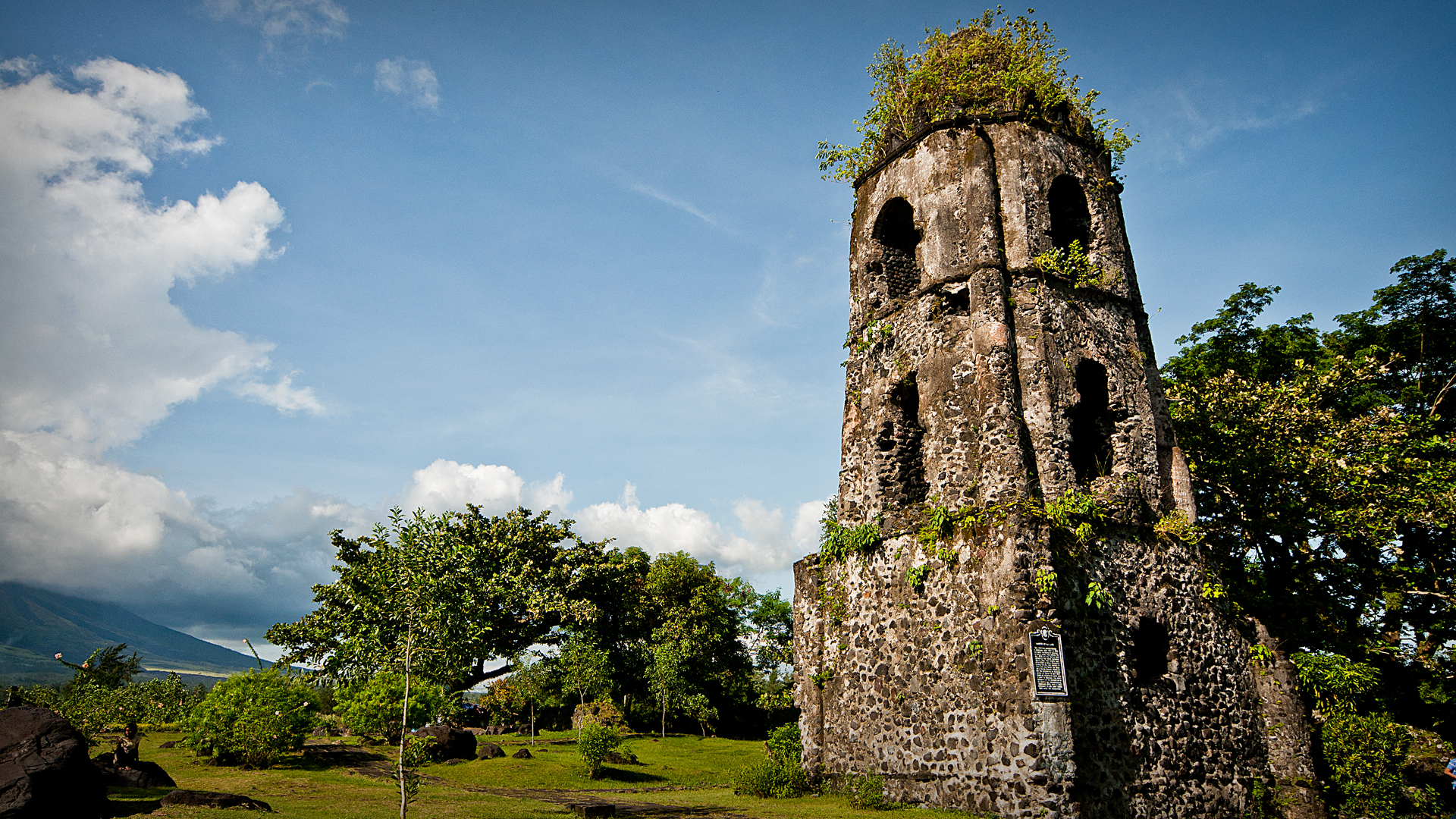
Only the church tower remains of the Cagsawa Church, which was buried by the 1814 eruption of Mayon Volcano.

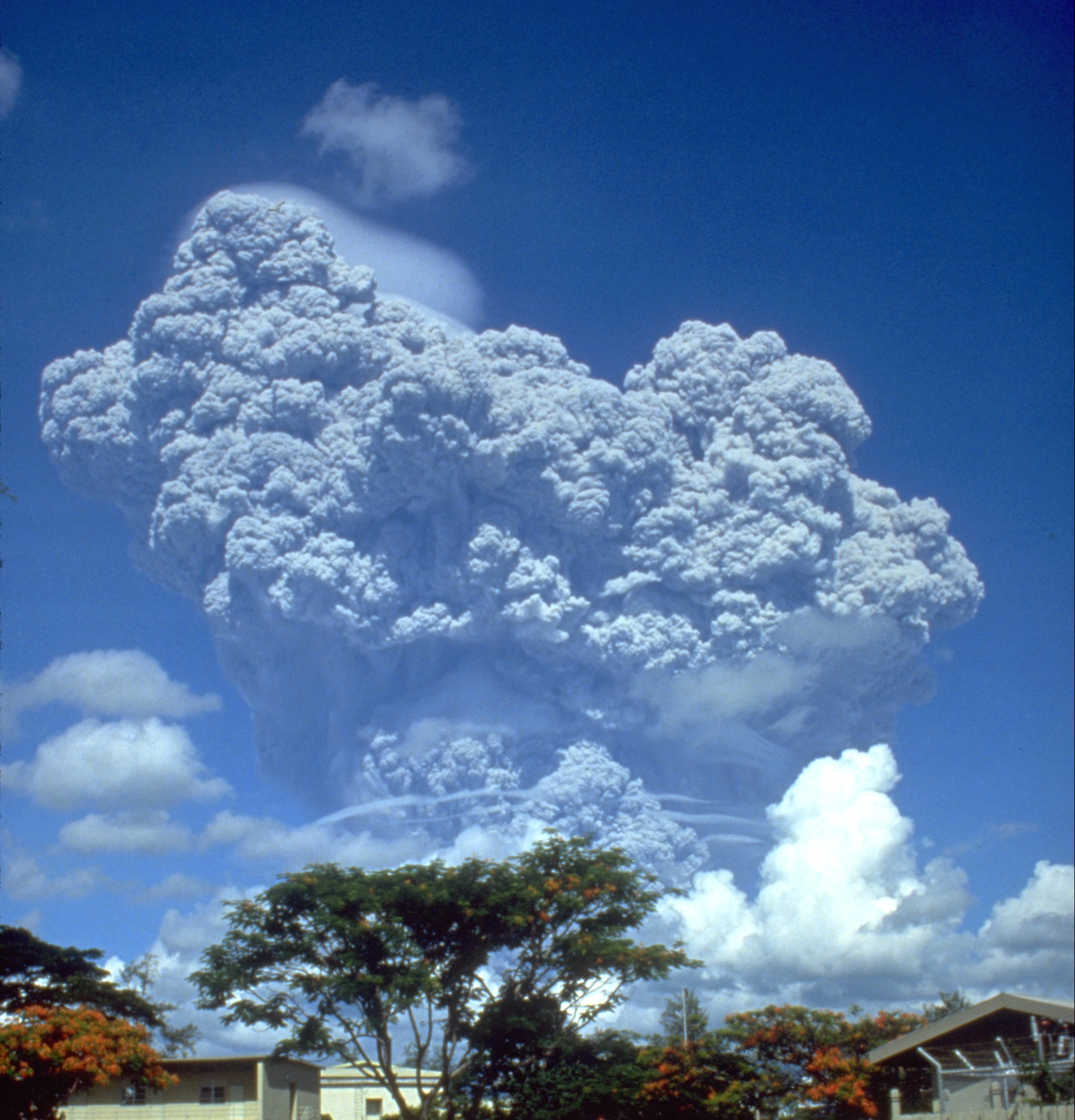
The eruption column of the modern Mount Pinatubo on June 12, 1991, three days before the climactic eruption.

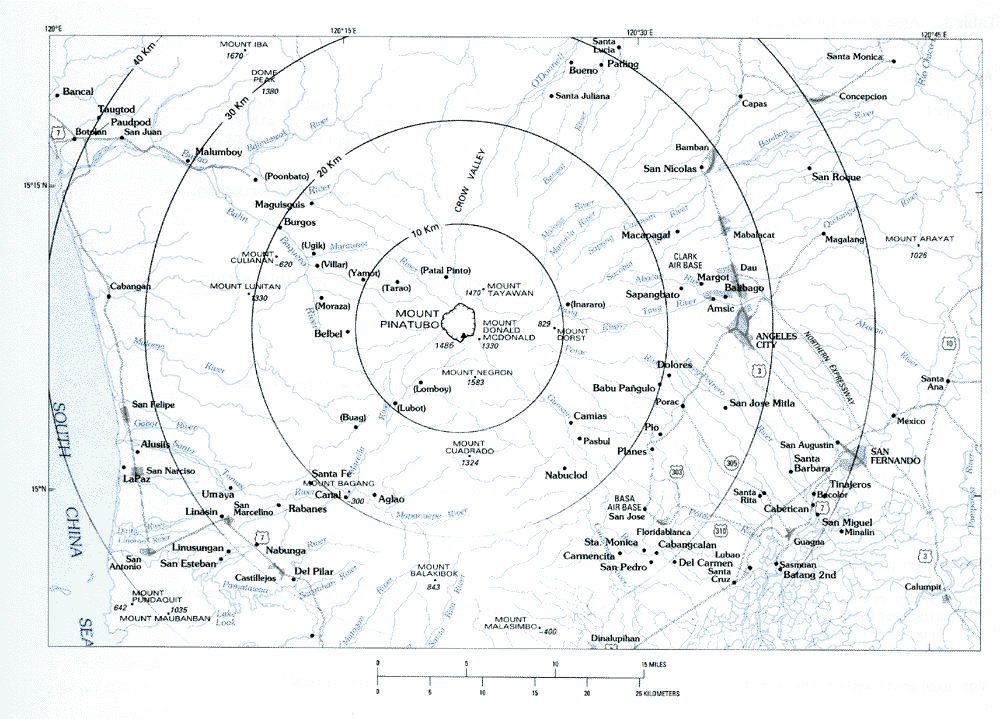
Map of Pinatubo showing nearby peaks and the evacuation zones.

Event	Date	Notes
Leonard Kniaseff	c.120 AD.	There was a scare in 1995 but PHIVOLCS investigation at the time did not disclose any unusual activity, and no unusual activity has been reported since.
San Pablo Volcanic Field	1350 AD +/- 100	Last activity was the formation of Sampaloc Lake around 1350 AD +/- 100 years determined by anthropology
Taal eruption	1572 to 2023	Currently on eruption since January 12, 2020. Eruptions have also destroyed numerous lakeside towns, burying them with volcanic ash or submerged them by rising lake waters displaced by the erupted material. The towns of Lipa, Taal, Sala, Bauan and Tanauan were formerly located along Taal Lake. Presently, only three towns are on the lake's shore. Remnants of the old lakeside towns are reported to be seen under the lake's waters.
Mayon eruption	1616 to 2018	The most destructive eruption of Mayon occurred on February 1, 1814 (VEI=4). Lava flowed but not as much compared to the 1766 eruption; Instead, the volcano was belching dark ash and eventually bombarded the town of Cagsawa with tephra that buried it. Trees were burned; rivers were certainly damaged. Proximate areas were also devastated by the eruption, with ash accumulating to 9 m (30 ft) in depth. In Albay, a total of 2,200 locals perished in what is considered to be the most lethal eruption in Mayon's history; estimates by PHIVOLCS list the casualties at about 1,200, however. The eruption is believed to have contributed to the accumulation of atmospheric ash, capped by the catastrophic eruption of Mount Tambora in 1815, that led to the Year Without a Summer in 1816.
Pinatubo eruption	1500 to 2021	Reawakened in 1991 producing the 2nd largest eruption in the 20th century. Followed by milder eruptions in 1992 and 1993.
Mt. Kanlaon eruption	1886 to 2024	The most active volcano in the Visayas, Kanlaon has erupted 26 times since 1919. Eruptions are typically phreatic explosions of small-to-moderate size that produce minor ash falls near the volcano. In 1902, the eruption was classified as strombolian, typified by the ejection of incandescent cinder, lapilli and lava bombs.
Bulusan eruption	1886 to 2022	Bulusan is generally known for its sudden steam-driven or phreatic explosions. It has erupted 16 times since 1885 and is considered as the 4th most active volcano in the Philippines after Mayon, Taal, and Kanlaon. There are evacuation procedures in place for parts of the peninsula, the farms nearest the volcano are evacuated, and many of the village schools are closed if it is considered possible that a more destructive eruption could occur.
Mt. Hibok-Hibok eruption	1827, 1862, 1871 and 1948–1952	On February 16, 1871, earthquakes and subterranean rumblings began to be felt in Camiguin, which increased in severity until April 30 when a volcanic fissure opened up 400 yards southwest of the village of Catarman, on the northwest flank of the Hibok-Hibok Volcano. From the opening, lava was continuously ejected and poured into the sea for four years destroying the town. At the same time, the vent started gaining in height and width thus forming Mt. Vulcan. In 1875, the Challenger expedition visited the area, and described the mountain as a dome, about 1,950 feet (590 m) in height, without any crater, but still smoking and incandescent at the top.

== See also ==
- List of maritime disasters in the Philippines
- List of man-made disasters in the Philippines
- List of earthquakes in the Philippines
- List of Philippine tornadoes
- List of Philippine typhoons
- List of active volcanoes in the Philippines
- List of inactive volcanoes in the Philippines
- List of potentially active volcanoes in the Philippines
- PAGASA
- PHIVOLCS
