= 2007 Glorietta explosion =

2007 incident in Makati, Philippines

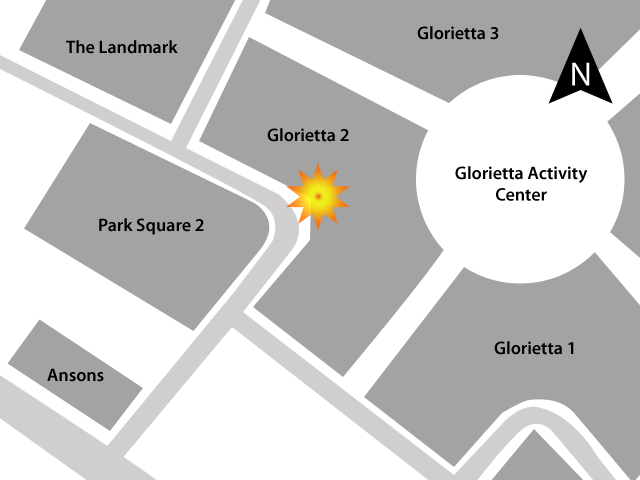
- Location of the explosion in Glorietta
- Date: October 19, 2007
- Time: 1:25 PM PST
- Location: Makati, Philippines; 14°33′04″N 121°01′28″E
- Deaths: 11
- Injuries: 129

On October 19, 2007, an explosion occurred in the Glorietta 2 section of the Glorietta shopping complex at Ayala Center in Makati, Metro Manila, Philippines, at around 1:25 pm (PST). Initial reports indicated that the explosion originated from an LPG tank explosion in a restaurant in the mall. However, authorities were unable to confirm the true nature or source of the explosion. The blast killed eleven people and injured more than a hundred.

== Background ==
Glorietta was formed under a redevelopment plan that merged the Makati Commercial Center (MCC) and Greenbelt into the unified Ayala Center. This overhaul merged several commercial buildings and shopping arcades around the former Glorietta park into a single indoor mall. As part of this consolidation, Glorietta 2, originally Quad 2, was opened in 1991 on the former site of the Makati Supermart building. The supermart had occupied the location from 1965 until it was destroyed by fire and demolished in the 1980s. While the upper retail levels were fully integrated with the mall, Glorietta's basement utility infrastructure remained separate and was controlled by the Makati Supermarket Corporation.

Glorietta 2 was previously involved in a bombing on May 17, 2000, along the pedestrian bridge connecting it to Park Square 2, injuring 13 people.

== The explosion ==
The explosion killed 11 people through shrapnel wounds, and at least 126 others were injured. It was first reported to be due to an accidentally ignited LPG tank from Luk Yuen Noodle House at Glorietta 2. It also affected the nearby Park Square 2 parking building. However, due to the extensive damage caused by the explosion, the Philippine National Police ruled this out and considered the cause to be a bomb. The Makati Rescue deployed a total of 40 rescue personnel and four emergency medical services (EMS) doctors to conduct search and rescue operations. The initial team of 10 Rescue personnel arrived at the scene some five minutes after the explosion.

Many of the victims were rushed to the Makati Medical Center and the Ospital ng Makati. The National Disaster Coordinating Council, identified 5 of the 11 fatalities as Lester Peregrina, Jose Alan de Jesus, Liza Enriquez and Janine Marcos, and Maureen De Leon. The latter's body was recovered by Philippine National Red Cross rescue teams.

As the investigation continued four days after the incident, authorities favored the possibility that the blast was caused by an accident and not a terrorist attack. Although traces of RDX (Cyclotrimethylenetrinitramine) were found on-site, this did not form conclusive proof that a bomb was the cause, as RDX also has commercial applications. The most probable cause, according to authorities, was the accumulation of methane gas in the building's septic tanks and as well as other combustible materials in its basement. Authorities, however, did not rule out the possibility of a terrorist attack.

On November 22, 2007, the PNP concluded that the explosion was caused by gas, and not a bomb. However they were still unsure how it happened. The police settled on the negligence angle.

=== Final report and lawsuits ===
On January 8, 2008, Ayala Land, Inc. (ALI)'s commissioned foreign experts found that the explosion was caused by a bomb with RDX components - cyclotrimethylenetrinitramine (used in military and industrial applications, in C-4, a plastic bomb). On January 10, 2008, Chief Superintendent Luizo Ticman announced that criminal cases of "reckless imprudence resulting in multiple homicide, physical injuries and damage to property" were to be filed against engineers Arnel Gonzales, Jowell Velvez, and Marcelo Botenes of the Ayala Property Management Corporation, and Candelario Valqueza of the Makati Supermarket Corporation; engineer Clifford Arriola, Joselito Buenaventura, Charlie Nepomuceno, Jonathan Ibuna, and Juan Ricafort of Marchem Industrial Sales and Service Inc.; for violation of the Fire Code: engineer Ricardo Cruz, operations manager of Metalline Enterprises and its foreman, Miguel Velasco; gross neglect of duty causing undue injury: Makati Fire Station Senior Fire Officer 4 Anthony Grey, SFO2 Leonilo Balais, Senior Inspector Reynaldo Enoc, and Chief Inspector Jose Embang Jr.; Makati Fire Station chief - "for simple neglect of duty-for failure to review and validate before issuing fire safety inspection certificate." Ticman stated that per final report signed by DILG Secretary Ronaldo Puno - "no bomb components were found at the basement of Glorietta 2 mall; the absence of any crater, bomb/explosive residue, or improvised explosive device in the "seat of explosion; no soot or blackening on the concave ceiling. The Multi-Agency Investigation Task Force final report detailed that the 1st blast was a methane explosion at 1:31 pm as the "gas accumulated after knee-deep water, diesel, human and kitchen waste at the mall's allegedly poorly ventilated basement was left unattended for 76 days"; the 2nd blast was "a diesel vapor explosion at 1:32 pm; the National Bureau of Investigation "identified the possible source of ignition" - the motor control panel of waste pumps two and three at the basement; rise in temperature caused by the methane gas triggered the 2nd explosion. The Australian Federal Police and US ambassador Kristie Kenney confirmed the US experts' findings similar to the police's investigation results which supported the MAITF's findings. On January 11, 2008, Ticman personally filed the complaint against the 15 accused at the Department of Justice in Manila.

On January 16, 2008, Kit Collier, an International Crisis Group consultant and international terror and insurgency expert, told foreign media members at a forum in Makati that he doubted the delayed final report of the PNP's findings that Glorietta 2 blast was due to a gas explosion. Collier noted the traces of RDX, or cyclotrimethylenetrinitramine, an explosive component, found in the site. Malaysian expert Aini Ling, commissioned by Ayala Land Inc.'s (ALI) investigation, stated in her report, that a bomb caused the explosion, due to RDX traces at the blast site. Meanwhile, Justice Secretary Raul M. Gonzalez announced a preliminary investigation on the criminal complaints filed by police. On January 22, 2008, Secretary Gonzalez absolved Ayala Land, Inc. (ALI), the attached company of holding company for Real Estate Ayala Corporation, from liability in the 2007 Glorietta explosion, but stated that Ayala Property Management, Inc. (APMC) was still under investigation.

The Department of Justice's "Task Force Glorietta" on May 22, 2008, recommended the filing of criminal cases of "reckless imprudence resulting in homicide and multiple physical injuries" against 8 accused—Candelario Valdueza, project engineer of Makati Supermarket Corporation (MSC), Clifford Arriola, operations manager of Marchem Industrial Sales and Services Inc.; Joselito Buenaventura, Marchem supervisor; Charlie Nepomuceno, Jonathan Ibuna, and Juan Ricaport, all Marchem maintenance personnel; Engr. Ricardo Cruz, operations manager of Metalline Enterprises, and foreman Miguel Velasco Jr. The report however cleared the other suspects. The 51-page resolution rejected Ayala Land Inc.'s bomb explosion theory, supported the police's biogas explosion evidence, and cleared Ayala Land Inc. and its engineers, citing that the Makati Supermarket Corporation owned the building and none of its equipment was supplied or designed by Ayala Land Inc.

==== Settlement ====
Ayala Land Inc. offered each of the families of the 11 blast victims a ₱4 million house and ₱1 million in cash by way of a settlement. Included were Marie de Jesus, Melanie Arroyo, Carlo Cruz, and Amado Pertas, among others.

== Aftermath ==
The day after the blast, normal operations continued in Glorietta after engineers inspecting the remaining parts of the mall found them structurally sound. Glorietta 2 remained closed, and some of the stores in the rest of the mall, mostly fast-food chains, remained closed.

As part of the existing Ayala Center redevelopment, tenants of Glorietta 1 and 2 were given an option to relocate to the newly constructed Glorietta 5; Glorietta 1 and 2 underwent reconstruction, with the addition of two office buildings, Holiday Inn & Suites Makati, and a roof deck called Top of the Glo. Tenants accepted the option, moving them until January 1, 2010. Park Square 2, which was affected by the explosion, was later demolished in 2011 as part of the redevelopment and was replaced by Terraces Square and Park Terraces condominium complex.

== Reaction ==
Ayala Land promised to cover the medical bills of those injured by the explosion. The United States and the United Kingdom, through their respective embassies expressed sympathy for the victims of the explosion, promising assistance to the Philippine government and the PNP in the investigation. President Gloria Macapagal Arroyo stated that there would be a full investigation of the explosion. She also said that the police and military were on their highest alert status, and that an additional 2,000 security officers were being deployed in public areas.

== In media ==
The 2007 blast was featured in a 2009 episode of GMA Network's Case Unclosed hosted by Arnold Clavio.

== See also ==
- 2013 Serendra explosion, another explosion involving an Ayala Land property
- 2017 Davao City mall fire, another shopping mall-related incident in the Philippines
