= 2026 Angeles City building collapse =

May 2026 building collapse in Central Luzon, Philippines

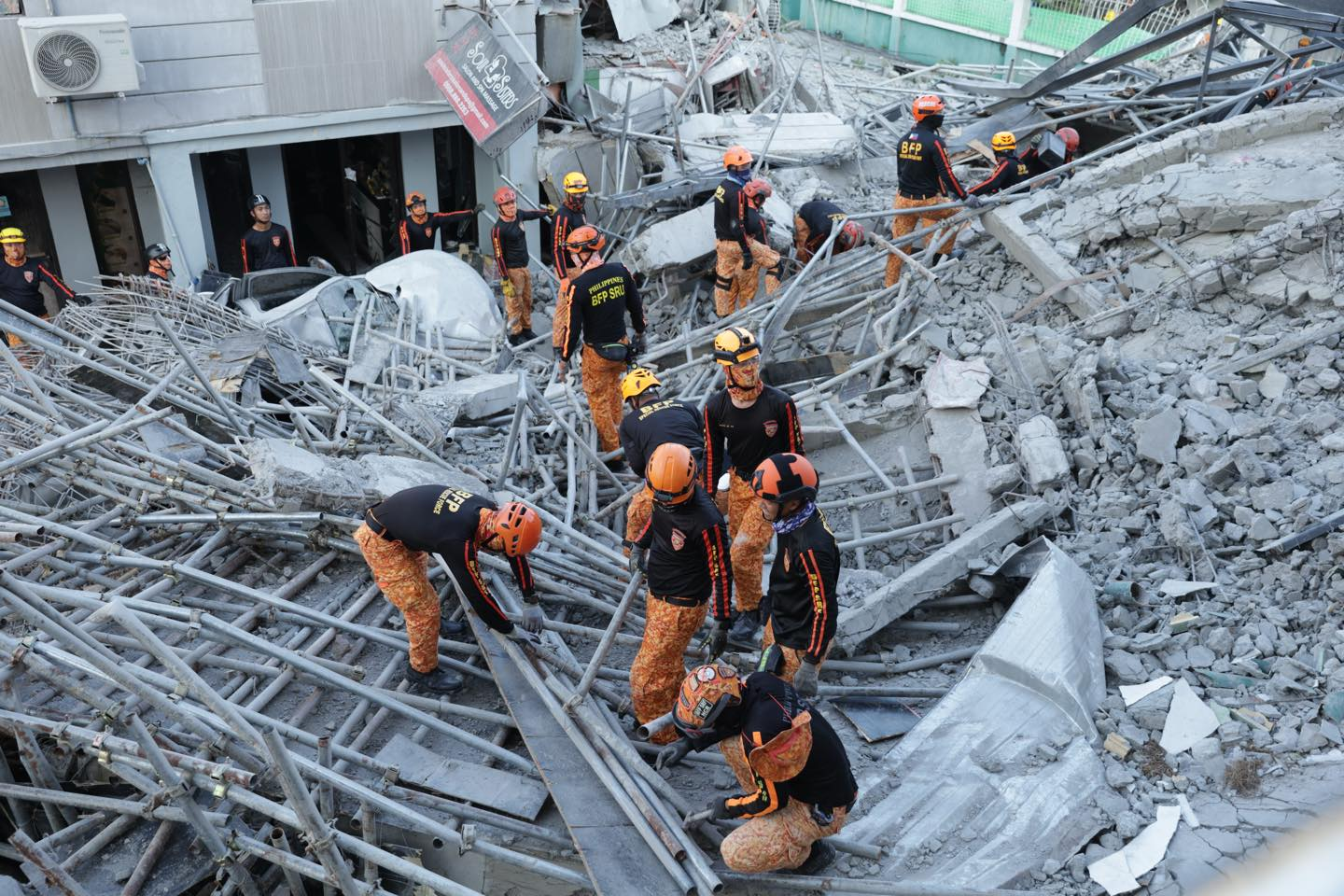
- BFP rescuers conduct search and rescue operations amid the debris of the collapsed building on May 25, 2026
- Date: May 24, 2026
- Time: 2:28:44 a.m (PHT)
- Location: Teodoro Street, corner Oak Street, Balibago, Angeles City, Philippines; 15°09′56.4″N 120°35′04.8″E
- Type: Structural failure
- Cause: Under investigation
- Deaths: 30
- Injuries: 8

On May 24, 2026, at 2:28:44 a.m. Philippine Standard Time (PHT), a nine-story mixed-use building under construction collapsed in Barangay Balibago, Angeles City, Philippines. The structure, which had been under construction since 2020 and was in its finishing stages, reportedly housed 30 to 40 construction workers sleeping inside at the time of the incident. The collapse also damaged a nearby apartelle. Thirty people were killed and eight others were injured.

Investigations into the cause of the collapse were launched by the Angeles City government, the Department of Public Works and Highways (DPWH), and the Philippine National Police (PNP).

== Background ==
The structure involved was a proposed nine-story mixed-use building intended to function as a hotel or apartment hotel (apartelle). According to local government records, construction began in 2020 along Teodoro Street, corner Oak Street, in Barangay Balibago, Angeles City, and was already in its finishing stages at the time of the collapse.

Prior to the incident, the site contained extensive scaffolding, structural steel bars, and concrete framing. At the time of the collapse, construction workers were sleeping on the building's second floor. According to planning records, the approved permit designated the structure as a nine-story condo-hotel, although construction of a swimming pool on a planned tenth floor was reportedly underway.

== Collapse ==
On May 24, 2026, at approximately 2:28:44 a.m. PHT, the nine-story structure collapsed, trapping the construction workers who were asleep at the time. The collapse also hit a nearby apartelle (apartment hotel). A delivery rider told Agence France-Presse that he had just delivered food on the same street when the collapse occurred. He reported hearing a sudden, loud noise that witnesses initially mistook for an earthquake. A video clip captured by the rider and verified by AFP showed a large pile of twisted steel beams, power pylons, and concrete slabs blocking the street immediately after the incident. The collapse also triggered a power outage in the area.

== Victims and response ==
A multi-agency search and rescue operation was immediately activated under a Unified Command System, with Angeles City Mayor Carmelo Lazatin II serving as the Responsible Official (RO). Department of Public Works and Highways (DPWH) Secretary Vince Dizon and Metropolitan Manila Development Authority (MMDA) General Manager Nicolas Torre III visited the site to assess the ongoing operation. The DPWH deployed two dump trucks, a backhoe, a boom truck, a crane, and engineering personnel to support the effort, while the MMDA dispatched its search and rescue team. Philippine National Police (PNP) Central Luzon Chief Brigadier General Jess Mendez also visited the site and directed police personnel to assist in traffic management and area security. Bulacan's Provincial Disaster Risk Reduction and Management Office (PDRRMO) chief Manuel Lucban Jr. announced the deployment of a team equipped with thermal drones to assist in locating survivors beneath the debris. The Pasig City government additionally deployed 15 Urban Search and Rescue (USAR) personnel equipped with life detectors, breaching equipment, and other search and rescue gear transported via vehicle to assist in locating victims.

Bureau of Fire Protection (BFP) Officer-in-Charge Fire Chief Superintendent Wilberto Rico Neil Kwan Tiu described the collapse as a "pancake collapse", noting that the structure's condition severely hampered search and rescue operations, as the flattened floors left little space for rescuers to work in. Kwan Tiu added that the pancaked structure prevented rescuers from immediately reaching several trapped workers who were still showing signs of life, and that extreme caution was necessary to avoid causing further collapse.

The site foreman estimated that approximately 30 to 40 workers, who had been sleeping inside the structure at the time of the collapse, were believed to be trapped. Eight bystanders in the vicinity of the building at the time of the incident were rescued with only minor abrasions and remained in stable condition. By 9:45 a.m., at least 10 workers, including the foreman, had been extracted and were reported to be in stable condition. BFP reported that by 2:30 p.m., a total of 24 individuals had been rescued and transported to Rafael Lazatin Memorial Medical Hospital for treatment. The City Social Welfare and Development Office reported that 35 affected individuals had received initial assistance, including financial aid, food packs, medical services, and psychosocial support, with further interventions under evaluation.

The collapse also damaged an adjacent hotel, resulting in the death of a 65-year-old Malaysian tourist with a disability. The victim was initially able to communicate with rescuers by phone while trapped under a section of the hotel wall, but died before he could be extricated. Shortly after midnight on May 25, a second male victim was recovered; responders administered cardiopulmonary resuscitation (CPR) and transported him to a nearby hospital, where he was pronounced dead on arrival, bringing the death toll to two. According to the ACDRRMO, as of 3:00 a.m., the total number of persons affected had reached 47, of whom 26 had been rescued. Later that morning, the BFP announced that a third victim had been recovered from the rubble, bringing the death toll to three. At least 18 individuals remained unaccounted for, based on lists provided by the site engineer and reports from families of workers who had not returned home following the incident.

By May 28, the death toll had reached six, with 15 still missing. On May 31, five more fatalities were confirmed. A 12th body was recovered in the early morning of June 1, followed by a 13th victim at noon. By June 2, six more victims were recovered, and no more persons were reported missing. However, an infant and another child was found dead at the site, raising the death toll to 21 amid reports that relatives of construction workers were also living at the site. By June 3, the death toll reached 27 following the discovery of more bodies. On June 5 at 9:56 pm, an additional individual was extricated, raising the death toll to 28. On June 7 and 8, two bodies were recovered, bringing the toll to 30. Seven of the dead were not part of the construction crew.

Several animals were also recovered from the scene, including a live dog believed to have been owned by the foreman that was transferred to a shelter, a dead dog, and a live chicken that was rescued on June 4. The chicken was believed to have belonged to a worker and was also attributed by rescuers for triggering life detectors in the previous days.

On June 10, after 18 days of continuous operation, an update from the BFP in Central Luzon stated they were concluding operational activities and would begin demobilizing emergency responders. Retrieval and clearing operations were concluded, with 95% of debris cleared.

== Investigation ==
According to Lazatin, the cause of the collapse had yet to be determined, although construction procedures and soil testing were among the factors being considered in the investigation. He also said that he wanted to determine whether substandard materials had been used in the building's construction. Dizon added that a technical team from the DPWH would assist in the investigation. On May 25, the day following the disaster, the PNP announced that it was assisting in the investigation, including examining possible violations of building regulations.

On July 24, the National Bureau of Investigation (NBI) Director Melvin Matibag said initial findings linked confiscated steel bars to the nine-story building collapse. A full report of use of low-grade construction materials in the project was being prepared by the NBI and be released soon. The linked substandard finished steel products were confiscated in a July 18 raid at Chuangxing Steel Inc. in Magalang, Pampanga.

In a September 3 Senate Committee on Economic Affairs’ hearing, NBI Senior Agent, lawyer Zulikha Marie Conales confirmed that some steel bars recovered from the collapsed building did indeed come from Chuangxing Steel Inc. Senator Risa Hontiveros, chairperson of the Senate Committee on Economic Affairs, raised additional concerns that the substandard steel may have been used in the construction of other buildings in the country.

In late September the Angeles City Fact-Finding and Investigation Task Force released its final report into the disaster. It found that structural design defects and unauthorized alterations during construction contributed to the collapse, including the overstressing of columns and bored piles, failure by the structural design to account for wind and seismic forces, and the insertion of steel beams and an additional framing system supporting a rooftop swimming pool that did not appear in the approved plans.

== Reactions ==
The Institute for Occupational Health and Safety Development (IOHSAD) expressed concern over the incident, calling for the immediate and safe rescue of all trapped workers and urging authorities to investigate the building's structural integrity in light of prior thunderstorms in the area. The group also flagged risks to nearby residents, noting reports of a missing family in the vicinity of the collapse site. IOHSAD further called for a swift and transparent investigation, with accountability for any proven safety violations, and renewed its push to amend the Occupational Safety and Health (OSH) law to impose stricter penalties for serious breaches.

== Aftermath ==
The liability of Golden Years Construction and Steelworks Corporation and Ernest Jackson Lim totaling PHP11.49 million was upheld by the Department of Labor and Employment (DOLE), in a news release on August 29. The liability covered PHP1.17 million in unpaid wages, underpaid wages, unpaid rest day premium and holiday pay, in addition to PHP10.32 million in administrative fines for OSH violations before the building collapse.

OSH violations included: failure to provide personal protective equipment, secure required permits for mechanical lifting equipment, deploy safety officers and first aiders and provide temporary accommodation for workers. A pattern of persistent and willful non-compliance included the submission of fake and invalid certificates for the projects first aider and safety officer.

== See also ==
- List of man-made disasters in the Philippines
