= HTI factory fire =

2017 fire in Cavite, Philippines

2017 HTI factory fire
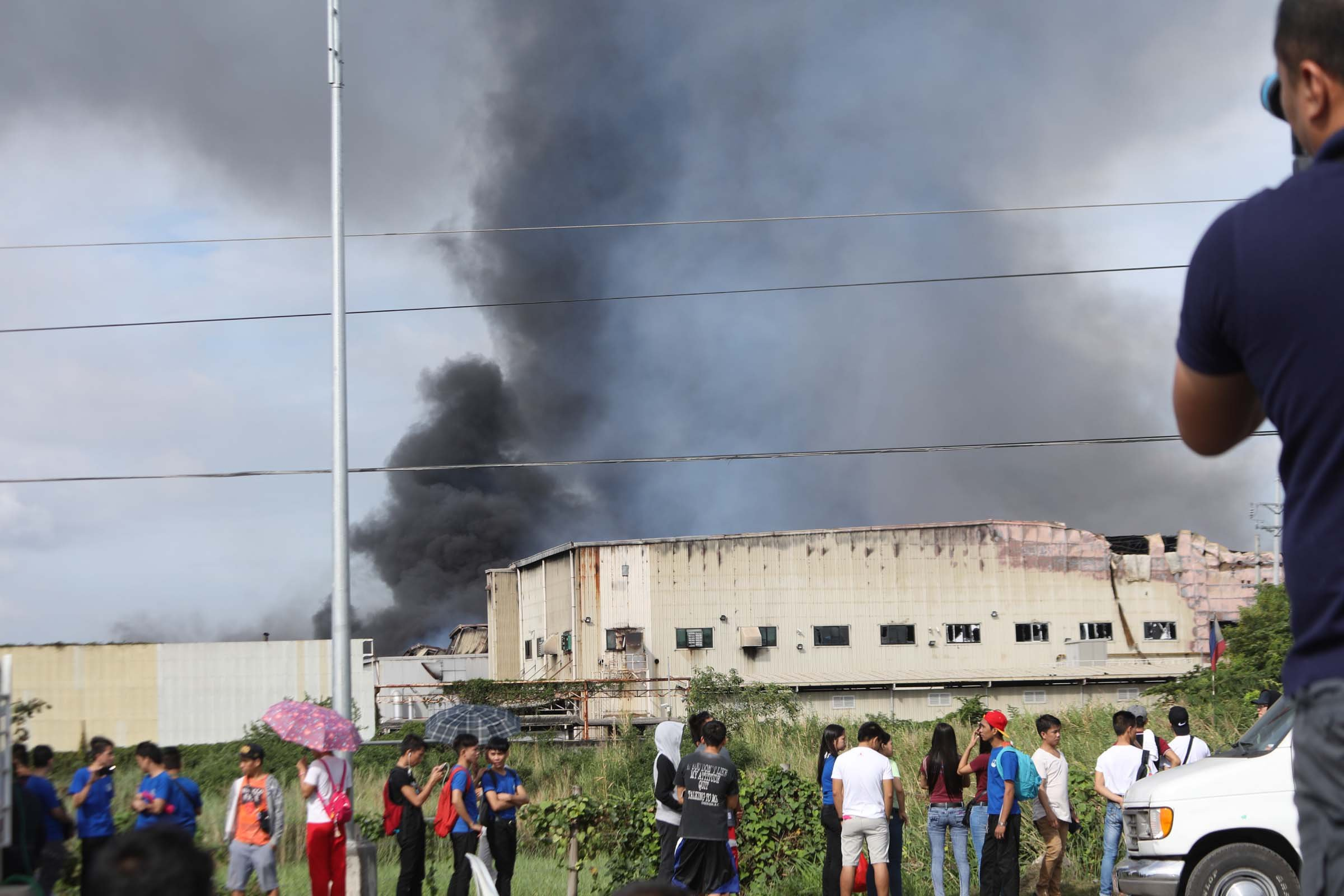
- Date: February 1–3, 2017
- Duration: 2 days
- Location: General Trias, Cavite, Philippines; 14.413660°N 120.875488°E
- Deaths: 5 (died in hospital)
- Injuries: 121
- Property damage: ₱15 billion

On February 1, 2017 at around 6:00 p.m. (UTC +8), a fire hit the House Technology Industries, Ltd. factory inside the Cavite Export Processing Zone in General Trias, Cavite.

== Incident ==
On February 1, around 746 employees were at work when the fire started according to Brig. Gen. Charito Plaza, director-general of Philippine Economic Zone Authority (PEZA). At 9pm, the third alarm was immediately raised.

== Aftermath ==
The fire was officially out at 4:15pm on February 3. Remulla said that some survivors suffered about 70% to 90% burns to their bodies.

The claims that there were fatalities which authorities tried to cover up were refuted by Remulla. The fire resulted in five fatalities who all died in hospital and not during the fire incident.

== See also ==
- Kentex slipper factory fire
