= 2013 Serendra explosion =

- Date: May 31, 2013
- Time: Time: 8:00 p.m. PHT Philippine Standard Time
- Location: Taguig, Philippines
- Deaths: 3
- Injuries: 5

The 2013 Serendra explosion was an explosion that occurred in the Two Serendra condominium complex occurred in Taguig, Metro Manila, Philippines. The explosion killed at least three people, and another five were injured in the area.

== Overview ==
The explosion occurred inside the Serendra condominium complex in Bonifacio Global City (BGC), Taguig. Six people were initially reported to have died before the death toll was revised down to three. The fatalities were identified as Salimar Natividad, driver of the Abenson delivery van along with two crew members Jeffrey Umali and Marlon Bandiola. Roxas said. The victims' closed van was crushed by a concrete wall that was blown off the Unit 501 of Two Serendra as they were passing by McKinley Parkway. It then collided with a Hyundai Starex van driven by Orlando Agravante, who was unhurt. The explosion which happened at about 8 p.m. PHT also injured Angelito San Juan, tenant of unit 501 of Two Serendra, who suffered burns. He was brought to the intensive care unit of the St. Luke's Medical Center – Global City, in BGC. The explosion generated a fire that traveled between the floor levels of the condominium building and a used fire extinguisher was earlier found at unit 506.

The other injured victims were identified as Allen Poole, an American and tenant of unit 683 who suffered cuts from shattered glass, and three passersby identified as Louise Lorenzo, a 9-year-old girl; Janice Nicole Bonjoc; and 19-year-old Joy Garcia. Bomb-sniffing dogs from the police and the Philippine Army did not detect any bomb residues from Unit 501.

== Investigation ==
Citing the findings of the inter-agency task force and foreign experts that looked into the incident, it was concluded that the leak in Unit 501-B was caused by the "unauthorized movement of the gas range (which) caused a detachment of the gas supply hose." The explosion occurred when the leak was ignited by a light switch. The tenant, one of four people who died as a result of the blast, was not alerted of the leakage because the "vaporized" LPG used in Serendra's pipeline system was odorless. The Ayala-owned Serendra Inc., in a statement, said that it had taken note of the findings of the interagency task force that investigated the explosion and that it remained “confident that government regulations and standards have been complied within the design and operation of Serendra.” Serendra Inc. promised to work with the government for the improvement of those standards and adhere to any changes in regulations.

Investigators identified the possible liabilities in the explosion of Alveo Land, the property developer of Two Serendra and subsidiary of Ayala Land inc, and Bonifacio Gas Corp. (BGC), the supplier of LPG to the building. Both companies belonged to the Ayala Corporation. Also facing possible charges were the owner and caretaker of Unit 501-B, officials of RM Larido Construction Services, which renovated the apartment, and Two Serendra Inc. It was also discovered that the workers of RM Larido Construction Services, with the consent of the owner, Marianne Cayton-Castillo, moved the gas range in Unit 501-B by 22.9 centimeters (9.0 in) from its original position when they renovated the apartment. The paint drippings on the hose of the gas range, which connects it to the main gas line, showed that the hose was lying on the floor when the explosion happened.

The investigators also noted that the steel clamp used to lock the hose connected to the gas range's nozzle was found far from where it should be, which meant that the workers did not properly refit the hose, Three employees of the construction firm admitted that they moved the gas range, even if it was not part of the renovation program. The accumulated gas fumes inside the room was ignited when the light switch was turned on. Safety gadgets failed the explosion could have been prevented had the gas leak detector and automatic shutoff valve of the gas range, and the separate LPG leak detector gadget of the building functioned properly. The building's only gas leak detector did not activate after a power outage in the area hours before the blast. The final report of the task force was then submitted to the Department of Justice, Department of Energy, Department of Public Works and Highways and other governmental agencies. In its efforts, the Philippine government sought the help of New York-based Kroll, Inc. Advisory Solutions, headed by certified fire investigator James William Munday, for an independent investigation of the blast. The government paid US$67,500 (equivalent to $93,295 in 2025), or about ₱3 million, to Kroll, which had investigated similar blasts in other parts of the country.

== See also ==
- 2007 Glorietta explosion
