= Cavite Economic Zone =

Export processing zone in the Philippines

Coordinates: 14°24′39″N 120°52′11″E

Official logo for the Cavite Economic Zone

The Cavite Economic Zone (CEZ), also known as the Cavite Export Processing Zone (CEPZ) and colloquially as EPZA (after the Export Processing Zone Authority), comprises 275 hectares (680 acres) of land encompassing the municipality of Rosario and the city of General Trias in the province of Cavite. It is located 30 kilometers (19 mi) south of Manila. It was developed in five phases.

== Creation ==
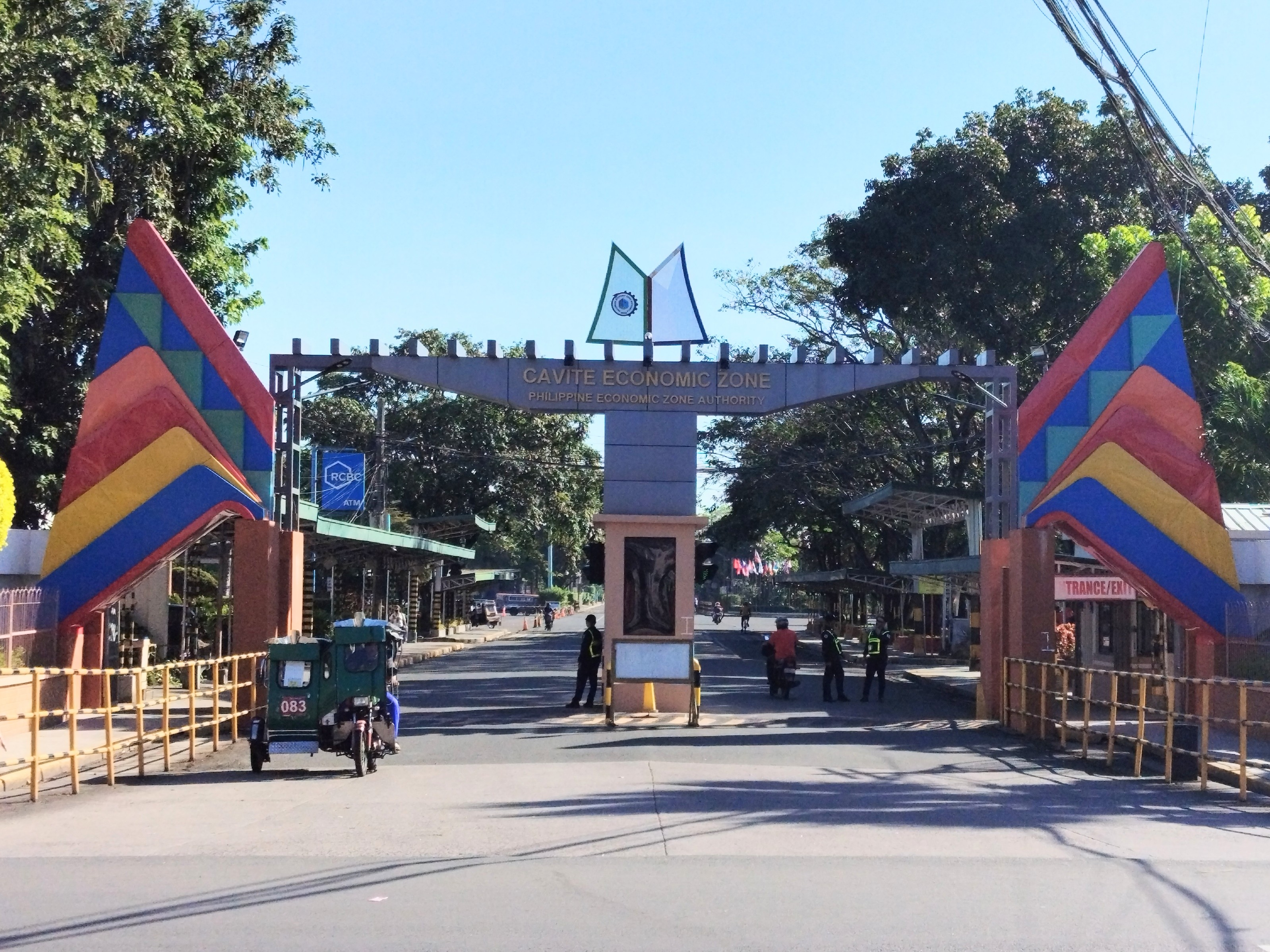
Cavite Economic Zone Gate 1 in Rosario

The Cavite Export Processing Zone was created by virtue of Presidential Proclamation Nos. 1980 and 2017 issued on May 30 and September 19, 1980 respectively. It later evolved into the Cavite Economic Zone when President Fidel V. Ramos signed into law the Special Economic Zone Act of 1995 on February 24, 1995. Under the act, the Export Processing Zone Authority (EPZA) was abolished to form a better organization and the Philippine Economic Zone Authority (PEZA) was established to assume jurisdiction over all Special Economic Zones. After that, the Cavite Export Processing Zone (CEPZ) came to be called the Cavite Economic Zone (CEZ).

As of December 31, 2012, there are 382 actively operating companies in CEPZ.

== Expansion ==
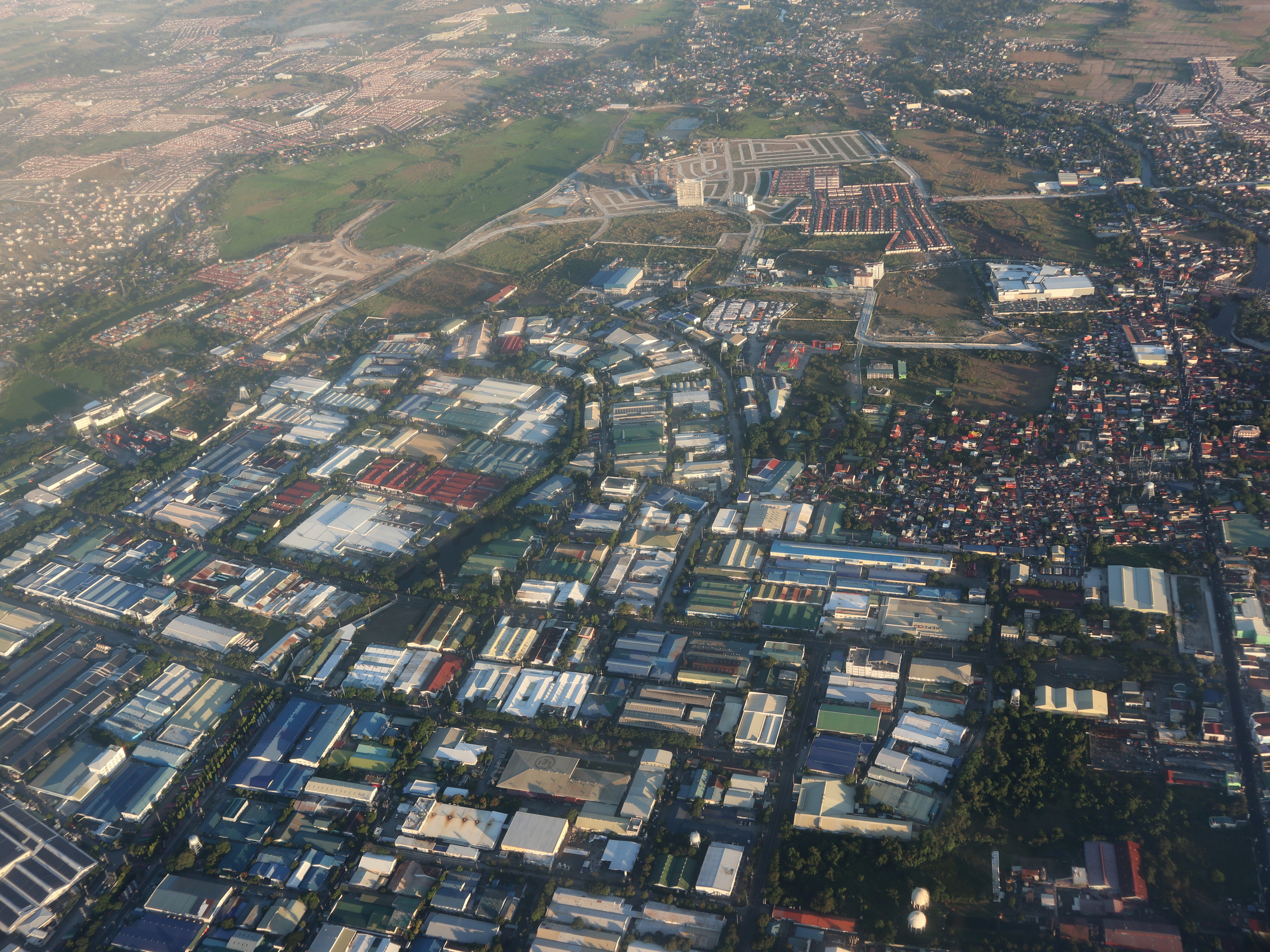
Aerial view of the Cavite Economic Zone

In the last few years, development has been ongoing on the General Trias side of the Cavite Export Processing Zone, which has now become the Cavite Export Processing Zone II. It is a 51.47-hectare (127.2-acre) Special Economic Zone located in Barangay Bacao II, General Trias, Cavite, developed and operated by Majestic Technical Skills Development and Landscape Corporation.

== Criticism ==
In her 1999 book No Logo, Canadian writer Naomi Klein examined the Cavite Economic Zone as a paradigm for export processing zones in developing countries. Klein criticized the lenient rules applied to companies operating within the zone, such as the tax exemptions awarded to nearly all factories in the zone, the low wages that workers in the zone were paid, and the lack of labor protections afforded to workers. In her discussions with workers in the Cavite Economic Zone, Klein documented explicit anti-union messaging, long and non-negotiable work shifts which were subject to sudden and frequent change, deaths and miscarriages due to overwork, and concerns about health risks due to hazardous chemical exposure. Noting the physical barriers between the zone and the rest of Rosario, the presence of armed guards patrolling the zone, and the inability of local governments to exercise any control over the zone, Klein sharply criticized the Cavite Economic Zone, calling it a "miniature military state inside a democracy".

== See also ==
- List of economic zones in the Philippines
- HTI factory fire
