= 2017 Davao City mall fire =

Shopping mall fire in Davao City, Philippines

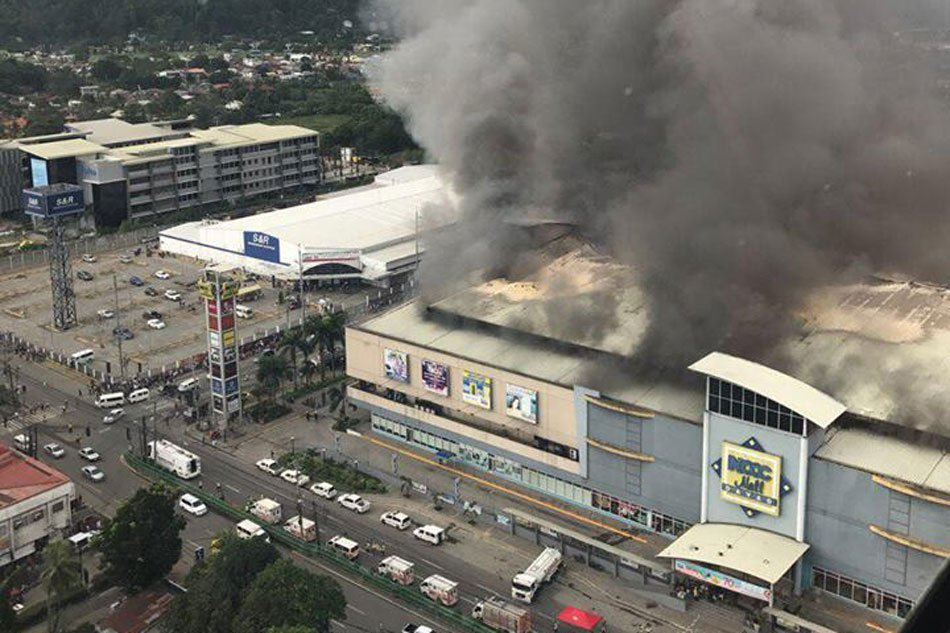
- Date: December 23, 2017
- Time: 9:30 a.m. PST (UTC+08:00)
- Location: New City Commercial Center, McArthur Highway Corner Ma-a, Davao City, Philippines; 7.0625°N 125.5916°E
- Cause: Faulty electrical wiring
- Deaths: 39

On December 23, 2017, a fire started at the New City Commercial Center (NCCC) shopping mall in Davao City, Philippines. At least 39 people were trapped inside the mall, mostly employees of the market research firm Survey Sampling International (SSI). The probable cause of the fire was faulty electrical wiring due to malpractice of the renovation of the mall's third floor. One body was found a day later, whilst 37 others were found on Christmas day. On December 27, the remains of a security guard who rescued 783 people from the mall was found.

The mall was nearly burnt down and the remaining structure was demolished due to safety concerns.

== Background ==
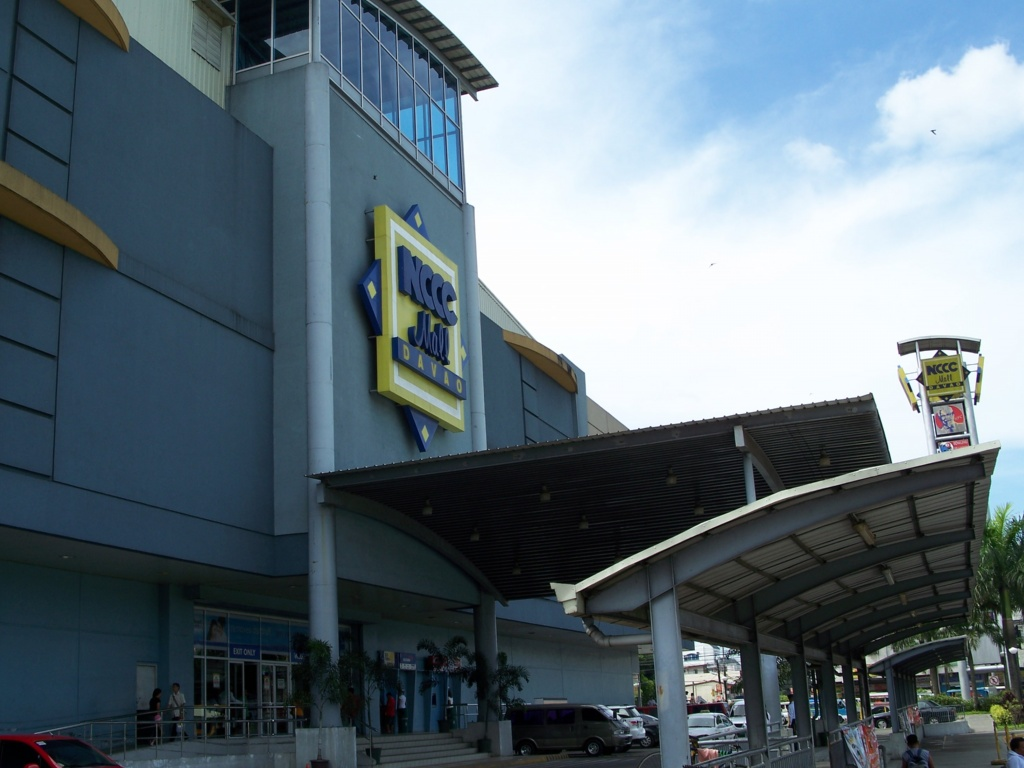
NCCC Mall Davao in July 2008, 9 years before the fire incident

The New City Commercial Center Mall Davao was a shopping mall located on the corner of MacArthur Highway and Ma-a Road in Davao City, Philippines. It was operated by the New City Commercial Corporation, which was owned by Chinese businessman Lim Tian Siu and his family. The mall opened in December 2003 as the largest project of the corporation. It was the corporation's second mall, after opening one in Tagum, Davao del Norte. The incident was not the first time a fire struck the corporation's projects. In September 2013, a fire burned an NCCC mall in Puerto Princesa, Palawan. Furthermore, it was not the first time the Lim family was affected by a fire incident. In 1952, the family established a textile business after relocating to Davao City, but was destroyed by fire.

== Fire ==
The fire started on the morning of Saturday, December 23, 2017. The Bureau of Fire Protection (BFP) reported that the fire started at around 9:30 a.m. PST (UTC+8). NCCC marketing manager Janna Abdullah Mutalib said that the fire started at the mall's third floor where the textiles (which were the materials that are flammable and caused the fire to worsen), school supplies and furniture were sold. At that time, the establishments were still closed to the public, except for the grocery store and the SSI office (located at the fourth floor, above where the fire started). The BFP's regional office in Davao received a radio call at 10:05 a.m. PST with the first units arriving at the scene six minutes later and at the same time, some parts of the mall began to fall apart (eventually, the logo of the mall was burned as well) due to the intense heat of the fire. At least six people rescued were treated at the Southern Philippines Medical Center for unspecified injuries. By 5 p.m. PST, the fire disseminated to other parts of the mall. About two hours later, parts of the floor began to collapse due to the severity of the fire.

BFP director for Southern Mindanao, Wilberto Kwan Tiu, who was the ground commander for the fire incident, said that 31 fire engines in total were deployed. He said that firefighters could not destroy parts of the building as it would have agitated the flames due to oxygen combustion. Instead, a fire protection engineering process called horizontal ventilation was used to allow the smoke to escape horizontally without extremely damaging the building. This allowed firefighters and other responders to slowly enter the building. Firefighters who had attempted to enter the building were forced to retreat as temperatures reached between 500 and 700 °C, which was enough to liquefy equipment and gears.

The relatives of occupants trapped inside the mall were situated at a restaurant across the mall. At this time, it was reported that 37 people were still trapped inside the building (later clarified to be 38), all of whom except for one were employees of the market research firm Survey Sampling International. At around 9:30 p.m. PST, approximately 12 hours after the fire started, President Rodrigo Duterte, Davao City Mayor Sara Duterte, Davao City Vice Mayor Paolo Duterte, Davao Archbishop Romulo Valles, and other officials arrived at the scene and met with the relatives as firefighting continued. By the end of the day, the fire was still out of control.

On the morning of Christmas Eve, December 24, after receiving updates from members of the rescue units on the condition of the fire, President Duterte announced that those trapped inside the mall had a "zero chance of survival." At 5:15 p.m. PST, about 32 hours since the fire started, the BFP declared "fire out".

Survivors of the incident have detailed their experiences on social media, which were collected by the Business Process Outsourcing Industry Employees Network (BIEN), a labor union representing business process outsourcing (BPO) workers in the Philippines. One survivor claimed that the emergency exits were impassable, while several others said that safety drills were never conducted. Some survivors also claimed that the mall's fire alarm system was not activated.

== Victims ==
At around 8 a.m. PST, responders were able to recover the remains of the first victim at a restroom near the SSI office. His body was so severely charred that forensic investigators had difficulty identifying him.

On Christmas Day, December 25, the bodies of the 37 remaining victims were recovered. The bodies were recovered from the lobby near the stairwell and the elevator. According to Kwan Tiu, the victims were located a few meters away from the stairwell. One of the victims, Melvin Gaa, was a security guard at the mall and a member of the mall's incident response team. During the fire, Gaa helped evacuate an estimated 783 mall goers, including 83 SSI employees. He, at several times, had already exited the building, but re-entered attempting to rescue more people until his death.

== Impact ==
The NCCC management reported that the mall's 660 employees were left unemployed due to the fire. The management assured their employees that they would continue to receive their salaries and other benefits. The management added that their 192 employees deployed under a contractual agreement called the Bmirck Cooperative may be deployed to other establishments in the city.

=== Government response ===
On December 24, 2017, Davao City Mayor Sara Duterte announced that the city's Christmas celebrations would be canceled. On December 25, the Davao City Council decided that the city's remaining peace and order funds will be used to assist the families of the victims. The city had been declared under a state of calamity due to Typhoon Tembin (Vinta). The Davao City government organized a help desk to assist the families of the victims.

On December 28, 2017, Labor and Employment Secretary Silvestre Bello III announced that the government would provide ₱30 million worth of assistance to those affected by the incident. Bello detailed that the relatives of the victims would receive ₱20,000 from the Department of Labor and Employment (DOLE), along with the Occupational Safety and Health Center and the Employees' Compensation Commission (ECC). In addition, the ECC would provide the relatives with ₱30,000 for burial assistance and at least ₱3,700 per month as survivorship pension.

== Investigation ==
On December 26, 2017, Justice Secretary Vitaliano Aguirre II ordered the DOLE and the National Bureau of Investigation (NBI) to conduct separate investigations into the incident. Aguirre instructed the NBI to determine possible criminal liabilities on those responsible. Labor and Employment Secretary Silvestre Bello III tasked the DOLE's regional office to determine whether the mall management violated any occupational safety and health standards.

BFP director Wilberto Kwan Tiu said that all 38 victims trapped inside the mall died of suffocation due to the release of toxic chemicals such as hydrogen cyanide (which was produced by the carpets and plastics) and carbon monoxide by the fire. Kwan Tiu said that the BFP will investigate the cause of the fire. Davao City fire marshal Honeyfritz Alagano said that the mall had insufficient ventilation and that all the emergency exits in the mall were operational, except for the one in the fourth floor where the SSI office was located.

Davao City Mayor Sara Duterte said that a third party investigator would represent the families of the victims, which was supported by the city government. She added that a multiagency task force led by the Department of the Interior and Local Government called the Interagency Anti-Arson Task Force (IAATF) would investigate the incident.

On December 28, 2017, Duterte declared that the NCCC mall was "fire safety compliant". Alagano confirmed that the mall contained the necessary fire safety requirements, such as a fire alarm system, a fire sprinkler system, and emergency exits. However, she could not confirm whether these systems were inoperative at the time of the incident, as reported by some survivors. NCCC's spokesperson Thea Padua said that the mall was inspected by fire officials annually in order to renew its business permit. Padua added that safety drills were conducted in the mall quarterly, the last one occurring on July 14, 2017.

On December 29, 2017, the IAATF deduced that the mall's emergency exits, which were inside the building, failed to meet certain requirements. IAATF investigator Jerry Candido said that the law requires interior emergency exits to be enclosed in order to prevent the entry of smoke. However, the IAATF discovered that the mall's interior emergency exits contained openings which allowed smoke to enter. The IAATF also discovered that the fire alarm system at the SSI office was defective, compatible to allegations made by some survivors which the NCCC management had denied. In addition, the fire alarm system at the SSI office was not connected to the NCCC's system. The IAATF later discovered that the mall's automatic fire suppression system did not function in the third and fourth floors as the valves of the fire sprinkler system were closed. The IAATF cited these loopholes as the reason for the failure of the victims to escape the building.

On January 10, 2018, charges were filed against eight BFP personnel from the Davao City Fire District for issuing a fire safety inspection certificate for the NCCC mall despite it failing to meet certain requirements of the Philippine fire code.

On December 19, 2018, almost a year later after the incident, charges against NCCC management and SSI were dropped; the IAATF has found insufficient evidence to file charges against any executives of the AC Rockport Construction and Development that handled the renovation of the mall's third floor. The task force has found that there was no malpractice in the installation of electrical wirings during the renovation at the third floor, which probably hasn't caused an electrical fire. Moreover, there was absence of appropriate license of some workers performing electrical works; and absence of building permit during renovation. The charges against the said executives were withdrawn after families of the victims filed "affidavits of desistance," which was received later that year.

== Reactions ==
=== Domestic ===
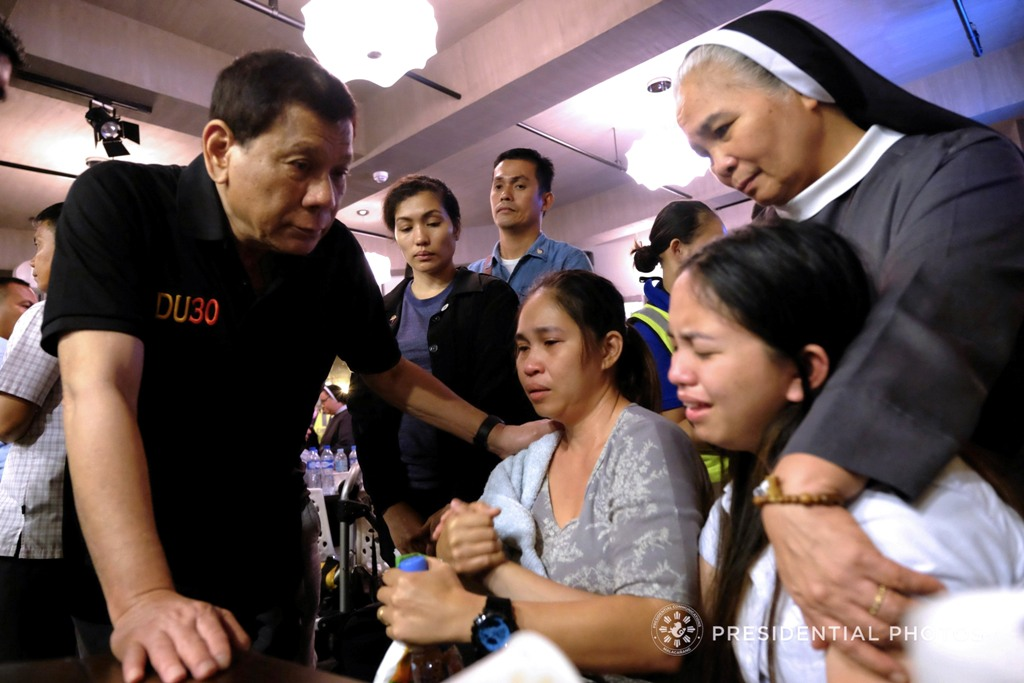
President Rodrigo Duterte consoles the relatives of one of the victims, December 24, 2017

On the evening of December 23, 2017, President Rodrigo Duterte paid an unannounced visit to the families of the victims trapped inside the mall. He consoled them upon the announcement that the victims may have a "zero chance of survival." Presidential Spokesperson Harry Roque assured the families that the government would extend assistance.

Senate President Aquilino Pimentel III offered his condolences to the victims. Pimentel urged the BFP to thoroughly investigate the incident.

Several labor unions criticized the government, particularly the DOLE, for their negligence in maintaining safe workplaces. The Federation of Free Workers (FFW) called on the DOLE, as well as the BFP and local government officials, to explain the fire. The FFW offered to send their safety officers to investigate the incident. BIEN labeled the incident as a "massacre of working people who strive hard to earn a living." BIEN claimed that safety drills are not conducted in BPO companies due to the unwanted suspension of operations. The Institute for Occupational Health and Safety Development (IOHSD) demanded the immediate release of investigation results. The IOHSD also advocated for the creation of new laws that would penalize companies that violate occupational safety and health standards, which BIEN expressed support for. The Associated Labor Unions-Trade Union Congress of the Philippines (ALU-TUCP) believed that a "routine and objective" inspection of the mall by the DOLE could have reduced the impact of such fire to property. The ALU-TUCP also criticized the management of SSI, the firm that employed 37 of the 38 victims, for failing to comply with the labor inspection standards on fire protection.

=== International ===
SSI issued a statement confirming that 37 victims were employees of the firm. SSI CEO Gary Laben announced that the firm will arrange counseling for its employees and will assist in the funeral arrangements for the victims. Laben added that a fund will be created to assist the families of the victims.

Japanese Prime Minister Shinzō Abe offered his condolences to the victims. Abe added that Japan is willing to provide assistance.

On December 27, 2017, Mayor Duterte announced that representatives from the Chinese government would visit Davao City to provide assistance to the families of the victims. These representatives visited Davao City on January 10, 2018, and met with Mayor Duterte. Chinese Ambassador to the Philippines Zhao Jianhua announced that the Chinese government offered ₱5 million to the families of the victims.

== Aftermath ==
The Bureau of Fire Protection assessed the entire building of the NCCC Mall Davao was totally damaged, except for the ground floor. The upper floors collapsed on top of each other, which made it difficult for firefighters to conduct their search and retrieval operations. As such, it was recommended that the 14-year old mall to be demolished since the building may potentially collapse entirely.

NCCC management applied for demolition on February 2, 2018, and commenced on May 19 of the same year after the building had been vacated and all utility lines such as electric, gas, telephone and water installations had been disconnected. As of November 2018, the mall complex has been totally torn down, including the building which housed a McDonald's branch, which was torn down later.

The NCCC has stated that there are plans to build a new mall at the site. A high-rise condominium and a newer version of NCCC Mall will take its place. Construction of the new NCCC Mall commenced in July 2021, with target completion in 2024, but on 2025, only the grocery store opened to the public, though the building is still under construction.

== See also ==
- List of fires
- Ozone Disco Club fire – worst fire in the Philippines, happened in 1996
