= 2013 Atimonan road crash =

Road incident in the Philippines

Coordinates: 13°59′44.59″N 121°55′14.25″E

2013 Atimonan crash

Details
- Date: October 19, 2013; 01:00 PST
- Location: Atimonan, Quezon
- Country: Philippines
- Operator: Superlines, Bicol Isarog Transport System, DLTBCo
- Incident type: Multiple collision
- Cause: Mechanical failure of first vehicle

Statistics
- Deaths: 20
- Injured: 54

The 2013 Atimonan road crash was a road accident involving three buses and five other vehicles which occurred on a zigzag diversion in Maharlika Highway in Barangay Santa Catalina, Atimonan, Quezon province. The road accident killed 20 people and another 54 were injured.

== Background ==
The site of crash, the zigzag diversion in Maharlika Highway in Atimonan Quezon is a notorious site for road accidents. The site is poorly lit and lacks sufficient traffic signs due to suspected sign theft.

Investigators confirmed that the accident happened at 1:00 am on October 19 when a truck carrying hog feed crashed into a Super Lines passenger bus at the descending diversion road in Maharlika Highway in Santa Catalina Atimonan which triggered more collisions. The passenger bus in turn collided into six other vehicles: two buses, two cargo trucks, a trailer truck and a van which were driving from the opposite direction. The vehicles were toppled and the accident resulted to many fatalities. The investigation also confirmed based on the Super Lines bus driver's testimony that the truck involved in the first collision experienced a mechanical failure causing it to crash to the Super Lines bus.

The Land Transportation Franchising and Regulatory Board (LTFRB) imposed a 30-day preventive suspension on the three bus lines involved. According to the LTFRB Chairman Atty. Winston Ginez, 35 units of Super Lines, 6 units of Bicol Isarog Transport System Incorporated and 20 units of Del Monte Land Transport Bus Company will be suspended. The bus lines involved will be given a chance to appeal.

The bus lines involve will also be required to attend a road worthiness seminar, have all their units undergo a vehicle check and all their drivers should undergo a drug testing. The LTFRB also sent an investigation team to the crash site.

The driver of the truck involved in the first collision died in the accident. Albert Nava the driver of the Super Lines bus was charged with reckless imprudence resulting in multiple homicide, multiple serious physical injuries and damage to property. The driver maintains that he was innocent and that he was one of the victims of the crash.
