= List of Spanish Filipinos =

The following is a list of notable Spanish Filipinos. A Spanish Filipino is any citizen or resident of the Philippines who is of Spanish ancestral origin.

== A - C ==
- Carla Abellana, actress, commercial model
- Jon Ramon Aboitiz, industrialist, member of Aboitiz clan
- Neile Adams, Filipino-American actress, singer and dancer. Ex-wife of Steve McQueen
- Ryan Agoncillo, actor, TV host
- Marvin Agustin, actor, chef and entrepreneur.
- Jestoni Alarcon, actor and politician
- Panchito Alba, actor and comedian
- Paulino Alcántara, footballer and manager of Club de Futbol de Barcelona
- Alona Alegre, actress
- Jojo Alejar, TV host, comedian
- José Alejandrino, Filipino general during the Philippine Revolution and the Philippine-American War
- Anthony Alonzo, late former action star, singer and politician
- Mariano Álvarez, revolutionary general
- Pinky Amador, actress, singer, commercial model and TV host
- Manuel Amechazurra, footballer
- Fernando Amorsolo, Was one of the most important artists in the history of painting in the Philippines
- Martin Andanar, radio, broadcasting journalist
- Gerald Anderson, actor, model, dancer (due to Mexican Hispanic heritage)
- Boots Anson-Roa, veteran actress
- Sol Aragones, former reporter turned politician
- Araneta family, prominent Spanish Filipino family
- Atom Araullo, currently broadcasting journalistic, reporter, film documentary for GMA News
- Robert Arevalo, artistic actor
- John Arcilla, actor
- Francis Arnaiz, former player of Toyota and Ginebra San Miguel basketball team, from 1975-1986
- Dindo Arroyo, actor and scriptwriter
- Basti Artadi, vocalist of Wolfgang
- Luis Eduardo Aute, A Philippine-born Spanish singer, songwriter, film director, actor, sculptor, writer and painter
- Rita Avila, actress and scriptwriter
- Mig Ayesa, Filipino-Australian singer
- Francisco Balagtas, Historic Philippine hero on poetry
- Carlos Balcells, musician, businessman, politician
- Paolo Ballesteros, actor, TV host, comedian, impersonator
- Jesus Balmori, journalist, playwright, and poet
- Gretchen Barretto, former actress and socialite
- Claudine Barreto, actress
- Julia Barretto, actress, model
- Marjorie Barretto, former actress and politician
- Aljo Bendijo, currently broadcasting journalistic for Sentro Balita weekdays
- Nida Blanca, actress
- Jackie Lou Blanco, actress
- Andres Bonifacio, Founder of the Katipunan, Philippine Hero
- Bernard Bonnin, actor
- J.C. Bonnin, actor
- Andrea Brillantes, actress
- Jose Burgos, martyr, priest
- Benedicto Cabrera, Filipino painter, was awarded National Artist of the Philippines for Visual Arts
- Iza Calzado, actress, model
- Antonio Carpio, lawyer
- Tia Carrere, actress
- Alan Peter Cayetano, politician, lawyer and diplomat
- Lino Cayetano, politician and TV director
- Pia Cayetano, politician, lawyer, economist, athlete, and TV host
- Carlos Celdran, artist, tour guide and cultural activist
- Claire Celdran, broadcast journalist, news anchor CNN Philippines
- Levi Celerio, artistic outstanding national artist of The Philippines for music & literature
- Chanty, singer and actress
- Gabby Concepcion, actor, director, singer-songwriter, businessman
- Paolo Contis, actor, host, singer and comedian
- Pilita Corrales, singer and songwriter
- Rez Cortez, actor and assistant director
- Donna Cruz, actress, opm artist, singer
- Tirso Cruz III, artistic actor
- Sunshine Cruz, actress
- Jake Cuenca, actor, model

== D - G ==
- Noli de Castro, Former Vice President of the Philippines, journalist
- Mark Dacascos, actor, martial artist
- Dingdong Dantes, actor, television presenter, dancer, commercial model and film producer
- Marlene Daudén, actress
- Charlie Davao, actor
- Ricky Davao, actor, host, director
- Jose de la Cruz, historic writer and poetry
- Rogelio de la Rosa, actor, diplomat
- Joey de Leon, comedian, actor, television presenter and songwriter
- Michael de Mesa, actor
- Carli de Murga, footballer
- Alessandra De Rossi, actress and writer
- Assunta De Rossi, actress
- JC de Vera, actor
- Nestor de Villa, classic film actor
- Johnny Delgado, actor
- Desiree del Valle, actress, model
- Gregorio del Pilar, one of the youngest generals in the history of the Philippines
- Marcelo H. del Pilar, Filipino writer, lawyer and journalist in the Spanish Era
- Monsour Del Rosario, actor, producer and martial artist
- Mila del Sol, classic film actress
- Angelika Dela Cruz, actress, model
- Mika Dela Cruz, actress
- Maggie dela Riva, actress
- Marianne Dela Riva, former actress
- Isabelo de los Reyes, politician, writer and labor activist
- Julio Diaz, actor
- Paquito Diaz, actor
- Romy Diaz, actor
- Gloria Diaz, beauty queen, actress
- Isko Moreno Domagoso, actor, former city mayor of manila
- Alex Eala, professional tennis player
- Kyle Echarri, actor
- Fred Elizalde, classical and jazz pianist, composer, conductor and bandleader
- Joaquín Miguel Elizalde, diplomat and businessman
- Geoff Eigenmann, actor
- Ryan Eigenmann, actor
- Alvin Elchico, reporter, journalistic of TV Patrol Weekend
- Juan Ponce Enrile, Jr., politician, businessman
- Sally Ponce Enrile, politician
- Elise Estrada, singer-songwriter & artistic actress
- John Estrada, actor, filmmaker
- Kaila Estrada, actress
- Jaime Fabregas, film actor and musical director
- Ejay Falcon, actor, model, endorser and politician
- Edmundo Farolan, actor, director and writer
- Julián Felipe, Composer of the Philippine National Anthem
- Andion Fernandez, operatic soprano
- Maritoni Fernandez, actress, model and businesswoman
- Rudy Fernandez, actor, film producer and director
- Eric Fructuoso, actor and dancer
- Amalia Fuentes, actress
- Peque Gallaga, veteran director-actor
- Helen Gamboa, veteran actress and cooking host
- Gazini Ganados, Miss Universe-Philippines 2019, model and TV presenter
- Jaime Garchitorena, actor, singer, businessman
- Mariano Garchitorena, politician
- Caloy Garcia, coach of Rain or Shine Elasto Painters.
- Cheska Garcia, actress, TV host, model
- Coleen Garcia, actress, host and model
- Eddie Garcia, film actor and director
- George Garcia, Commissioner of COMELEC, lawyer
- Marco Polo Garcia, character actor, comedian
- Patrick Garcia, actor and model
- Rodolfo Boy Garcia, character actor
- Toni Rose Gayda, TV host
- Janno Gibbs, actor, comedian, and singer
- Cherie Gil, actress
- Enrique Gil, actor and product endorser
- Mark Gil, actor
- Rosemarie Gil, actress
- Dominador Gómez, nationalist, physician and a labor leader
- Mariano Gomez, martyr, priest
- Charlene Gonzales, Bb. Pilipinas-Universe 1994, actress, TV host, model
- Cristina Gonzales, actress, politician, model
- Jose Mari Gonzales, actor, businessman, politician
- Beauty Gonzalez, actress, host, model, vlogger
- Isabel Granada, singer and actor
- Fernando María Guerrero, poet, journalist, lawyer, politician and polyglot
- Angel Guirado, footballer
- Eddie Gutierrez, actor
- Janine Gutierrez, actress
- Raymond Gutierrez, TV host, editor, columnist, endorser and actor
- Richard Gutierrez, actor
- Ruffa Gutierrez, actress

== H - L ==
- Kristine Hermosa, actress
- Adriano Hernández, Filipino revolutionary, patriot and military strategist during the Philippine Revolution and the Philippine-American War.
- Subas Herrero, actor, comedian, singer
- Félix Hidalgo, Acknowledged as one of the great Filipino painters of the late 19th century
- Pia Hontiveros, broadcast journalist, Chief Correspondent CNN Philippines
- Enrique Iglesias, singer
- Julio Iglesias Jr., singer
- Barbie Imperial, actress and model
- Dick Israel, character actor
- Emilio Jacinto, Filipino general during the Philippine Revolution
- Junior, (Antonio Morales Barretto) singer and actor in Spain and the Philippines
- Lalaine, American singer and actress
- Lito Lapid, actor, movie director, politician
- Mark Lapid, actor and politician
- Denise Laurel, romantic actress
- Monique Lhuillier, famous US-based fashion designer to celebrities
- Lilet, singer, TV host, actress and model
- Celso Lobregat, politician
- Gina Lopez, advocate & TV host
- Graciano Lopez-Jaena, Founder and first editor of the newspaper La Solidaridad
- Bing Loyzaga, actress
- Caloy Loyzaga, Filipino basketball player
- Chito Loyzaga, former basketball player
- Diego Loyzaga, actor and VJ
- Joey Loyzaga, basketball player
- Maloy Lozanes, singer, German Eurodance, based in Germany
- Sid Lucero, actor
- Antonio Luna, Historic Philippine general
- Juan Luna, Was a Filipino painter, sculptor and a political activist of the Philippine Revolution during the late 19th century
- Nadine Lustre, actress, singer and model

== M - Q ==
- Ruru Madrid, actor, comedian, TV host
- Jamby Madrigal, politician, businesswoman
- Vicente Madrigal, business tycoon, industrialist and politician
- Pancho Magalona, actor
- Francisco Mañosa, famous architect noted for his Filipino inspired architectural designs
- Edu Manzano, actor, host, product endorser, and politician
- Kuya Manzano, actor, singer, influencer, and entrepreneur
- Luis Manzano, actor, host, and product endorser
- Joseph Marco, actor, commercial model
- Imelda Marcos, model and wife of the late President Ferdinand Marcos
- Belle Mariano, actress, singer and commercial model
- Coco Martin, actor, director, producer, and screenwriter
- Ronwaldo Martin, actor
- Albert Martinez, actor, director, and producer.
- William Martinez, actor
- Aiko Melendez, actress and politician
- Cherie Mercado, currently broadcasting journalistic employee for CNN Philippines
- Jennylyn Mercado, singer, actress, model, TV host
- Eddie Mesa, actor, singer, pastor
- Mario Montenegro, classic film actor
- Valeen Montenegro, actress, model
- Vina Morales, singer and actress
- Margarita Moran-Floirendo, Miss Universe 1973, patron of the arts, peace advocate
- German Moreno, actor, comedian, host, talent manager
- Aga Muhlach, actor, host, and product endorser
- Niño Muhlach, actor
- Diether Ocampo, actor, singer, model and military officer
- Mario O'Hara, film director, film producer and screenwriter
- Henry Omaga-Diaz, broadcaster journalistic of ABS-CBN News
- Marga Ortigas, broadcast journalist with Al Jazeera English, former reporter with CNN International
- José Ozámiz, Senator and the first Governor of Misamis Occidental
- Pablo of SB19, singer and rapper
- Rommel Padilla, actor, businessman
- Bernard Palanca, actor and product endorser
- Marcelo Azcárraga Palmero, the thirteenth Prime Minister of Spain.
- Angelica Panganiban, actress, host and model
- Jose Panganiban, newspaper writer
- Paraluman, classic film actress
- Jim Paredes, singer, actor, composer, songwriter, television host and activist
- Javier Patiño, Azkal's striker
- Amy Perez, TV host and actress
- Barbara Perez, actress
- Pilar Pilapil, veteran actress
- Fernando Poe Jr., actor, producer, and director
- Fernando Poe Sr., actor
- Lovi Poe, actress, model
- Isabel Preysler, Spanish socialite, mother of Enrique Iglesias, former spouse of Julio Iglesias
- Manuel L. Quezon, first President of the Commonwealth of the Philippines
- Eric Quizon, actor, director, producer, writer and comedian
- Epy Quizon, actor, comedian and host
- Rodolfo "Dolphy" Vera Quizon, actor, producer and comedian

== R - T ==
- Annabelle Rama, actress
- Polo Ravales, actor, model
- Delia Razon, actress
- Enrique K. Razon, industrialist, head of International Container Terminal Services, Inc.
- John Regala, actor, Christian minister, environmentalist
- Ram Revilla, actor, model
- Ramon Revilla Sr., former actor, former movie producer, politician
- Efren Reyes Jr., actor
- Efren Reyes Sr., actor, producer, and director
- Artemio Ricarte, Historic Philippine General
- Ronnie Ricketts, actor, scriptwriter, film director, line producer, and martial arts artist
- Guillermo Gómez Rivera, Hispanist, multilingual author, historian, language scholar
- Jose Mercado Rizal, Philippine national hero
- Ross Rival, actor
- Marian Rivera, actress model
- Dante Rivero, actor
- Rosanna Roces, actress
- Susan Roces, late veteran actress
- Miguel Rodriguez, actor, politician, model
- Ruby Rodriguez, comedian, actress, TV host
- Paco Román, colonel in the Philippine Revolutionary Army
- Chanda Romero, actress
- Gloria Romero, late veteran actress
- Daisy Romualdez, actress
- Daniel Z. Romualdez, politician
- Norberto Romualdez, writer, politician, jurist, and statesman
- Rosa Rosal, actress
- Jericho Rosales, actor, model, singer, TV host
- Snooky Serna, actress
- Janella Salvador, actress and singer
- Lou Salvador, basketball player, stage actor, and talent manager
- Lou Salvador Jr. actor, dubbed as "James Dean of the Philippines"
- Maja Salvador, actress
- Phillip Salvador, actor
- Nadine Samonte, actress
- Sylvia Sanchez, actress
- Alex Santos, currently broadcasting journalistic & narrator
- Erik Santos, opm singer
- Charo Santos-Concio, board member chief content of ABS-CBN Corporation president of ABS-CBN University
- Rob Schneider, actor, comedian
- Jennifer Sevilla, actress, singer and businesswoman
- Armida Siguion-Reyna, celebrity, singer, film and stage actress, producer, television show host
- Gabriela Silang, female revolutionary leader
- Connie Sison, currently broadcasting journalistic for Balitang Tanghali
- Shalani Soledad, politician
- Arthur Solinap, actor, comedian
- Jesusa Purificacion Levy Sonora, actress, endorser
- Andres Soriano, industrialist, soldier, philanthropist, former President of San Miguel, founder of ANSCOR
- Andres Soriano Jr., industrialist, philanthropist, former CEO of San Miguel Corporation and ANSCOR
- Eduardo Teus, a footballer who played for Real Madrid.
- Lorna Tolentino, actress
- Thea Tolentino, actress, model
- Tessie Tomas, actress and comedian
- Lucy Torres-Gomez, politician, actress, TV host, model
- Tomas Trigo, Azkal's goalkeeper
- Juancho Trivino, actor, model

== U - Z ==
- Ariel Ureta, comedian, actor, TV host
- Ronaldo Valdez, actor
- Gary Valenciano, singer, composer, arranger, writer
- Luis Rodríguez Varela, "El Conde Filipino", early Philippine nationalist
- Alfred Vargas, educator, actor
- Jake Vargas, actor, singer-songwriter, musician, dancer of GMA Artist Center
- Ian Veneracion, actor, pilot, sportsman
- Nova Villa, actress, veteran comedian
- Luigi Villafuerte, politician
- Luis Villafuerte Jr., politician
- Luis Villafuerte Sr., politician
- Migz Villafuerte, politician and model
- Emilio Villeta, industrialist, franchised dealer of Francisco Motors Corporation
- Roi Vinzon, actor, director
- Jillian Ward, actress and product endorser (due to Mexican Hispanic heritage)
- Anjo Yllana, actor, comedian, television host, politician
- Jomari Yllana, actor, model, racing driver, concert producer, promoter and politician
- Yael Yuzon, lead singer and rhythm guitarist of Band Spongecola
- Jacinto Zamora, martyr, priest
- Zandro Zamora, character actor
- Jessa Zaragoza, opm singer, actress, comedian
- Zobel de Ayala family, prominent Spanish Filipino family; business billionaire person
- Enrique Zobel, industrialist, Philippine Air Force Colonel, pilot, polo player, philanthropist
- Jaime Augusto Zobel de Ayala, industrialist, philanthropist, member of the Zobel de Ayala clan
- Jaime Zobel de Ayala, industrialist, philanthropist, member of the Zobel de Ayala clan
- Fernando Zóbel de Ayala y Montojo, painter, art collector, founded Museo de Arte Abstracto Español in Spain
- Joel Reyes Zobel, radio broadcaster, currently broadcasting journalistic for GMA NEWS TV
- Migz Zubiri, politician, businessman, environmentalist

== See also ==
- Filipino people of Spanish ancestry
- Latin Union
- Hispanic
- Hispanosphere
- Panhispanism
