= Patricio Montojo y Pasarón =

Spanish Navy officer

Patricio Montojo
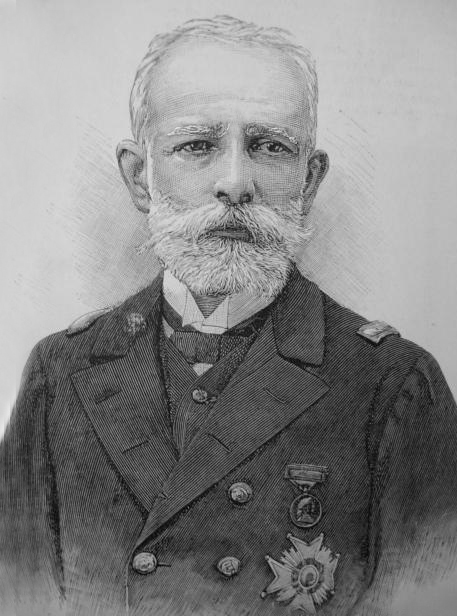
- Born: September 7, 1839; Ferrol, Province of A Coruña
- Died: September 30, 1917 (aged 78); Madrid, Community of Madrid
- Military career
- Allegiance: Spain
- Branch: Spanish Navy
- Service years: 1855–1899
- Rank: Contraalmirante (Rear Admiral)
- Nicknames: "The fighting Montojo", "The Hispanic Burden" by George Dewey.
- Commands: Pacific Squadron
- Conflicts: Chincha Islands War: Battle of Abtao; Battle of Callao; Spanish–American War: Battle of Manila Bay

Patricio Montojo y Pasarón (September 7, 1839 – September 30, 1917) was a Spanish Navy officer who commanded Spain's Pacific Squadron based in the Philippines during the Spanish–American War. Considered a man of high ability and experience, he was given the difficult task of defending the Spanish Philippines with a small navy and low supplies against a larger U.S. Asiatic Squadron. Despite his valor and determination, Montojo's navy was defeated at the decisive Battle of Manila Bay by a United States Navy squadron under Commodore George Dewey. He was later held accountable for the defeat and was court-martialed in Spain. Although the decision was later overturned, Montojo was still discharged from the Spanish Navy.

== Early life and career ==
Born in Ferrol, Galicia, Montojo studied at the Naval School in the southern Spanish city of Cádiz and was assigned as a midshipman in 1855. By 1860, he had become a sublieutenant and fought against the Moros of Mindanao in the Philippines before he returned to Spain in 1864. During his stay in the Philippines, the Spanish officer visited China and the French colony in southern Vietnam.

Montojo fought in the Battle of Abtao and the Battle of El Callao under Admiral Casto Méndez Núñez against Peru and assumed a post at the Secretariat of the Admiralty. He was promoted to the rank of Commander in 1873. His new duties included commanding several warships at the Havana naval station as well as those in the Río de la Plata. Montojo remained in Madrid until November 1891, when he was promoted to flag officer. In 1892, he became a candidate for the Order of Isabella the Catholic, and in 1897, he received the Military Order of María Cristina.

== Service in the Philippines ==
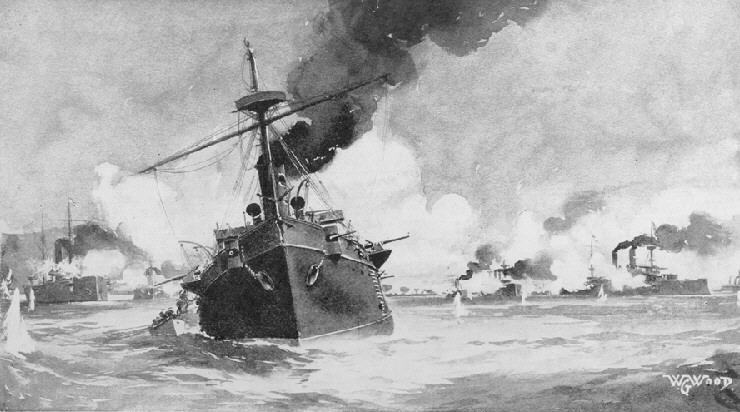
A painting of the battle with Montojo's flagship, Reina Cristina, in the foreground

By 1898, Montojo returned to the Philippines as rear admiral, serving as general commander of all Spanish Philippine naval stations and taking part in operations against Filipino insurgents. At a meeting with the colony's captain general, Basilio Augustín, on March 15, 1898, he expressed his concerns that their forces would be destroyed by the Americans in battle because of their disadvantages, as it became apparent that war with the United States was increasingly likely. Of the 37 ships in the Spanish naval fleet stationed in the Philippines, most were small gunboats and so there were only seven ships that would be used to take on the U.S. Asiatic Squadron. In addition, there were other problems facing the Spaniards. Their force did not possess enough adequate mines, and some of the ones they had lacked components. The admiral requested additional supplies from the homeland, but they were ultimately not delivered. In the end, Montojo decided to send the squadron to Subic Bay to the northwest of Manila, which would be easier to defend for the Spaniards when the American ships arrived. If they ignored them and headed for Manila, he believed his squadron could then head back and ambush the U.S. squadron at night.

However, when the Americans had arrived and checked at Subic on April 30, they found no Spanish ships there because Montojo had judged the position to be indefensible since the Spaniards, being behind schedule, had not finished installing the naval guns on the ground at the entrance to Subic Bay. However, according to American scouts, the guns were lying on the beach and could have been mounted in less than 24 hours. In addition, the wooden cruiser Castilla had technical problems. Thus, a council of squadron captains decided to return to Manila Bay. Reportedly, another factor in Montojo's decision was that he would not be able to save Spanish sailors in the depth of forty meters of water at Subic, which American naval officers found to be astounding. Thus, the American squadron leader, Admiral George Dewey and his other officers initially had a low opinion of the Spanish commander's abilities.

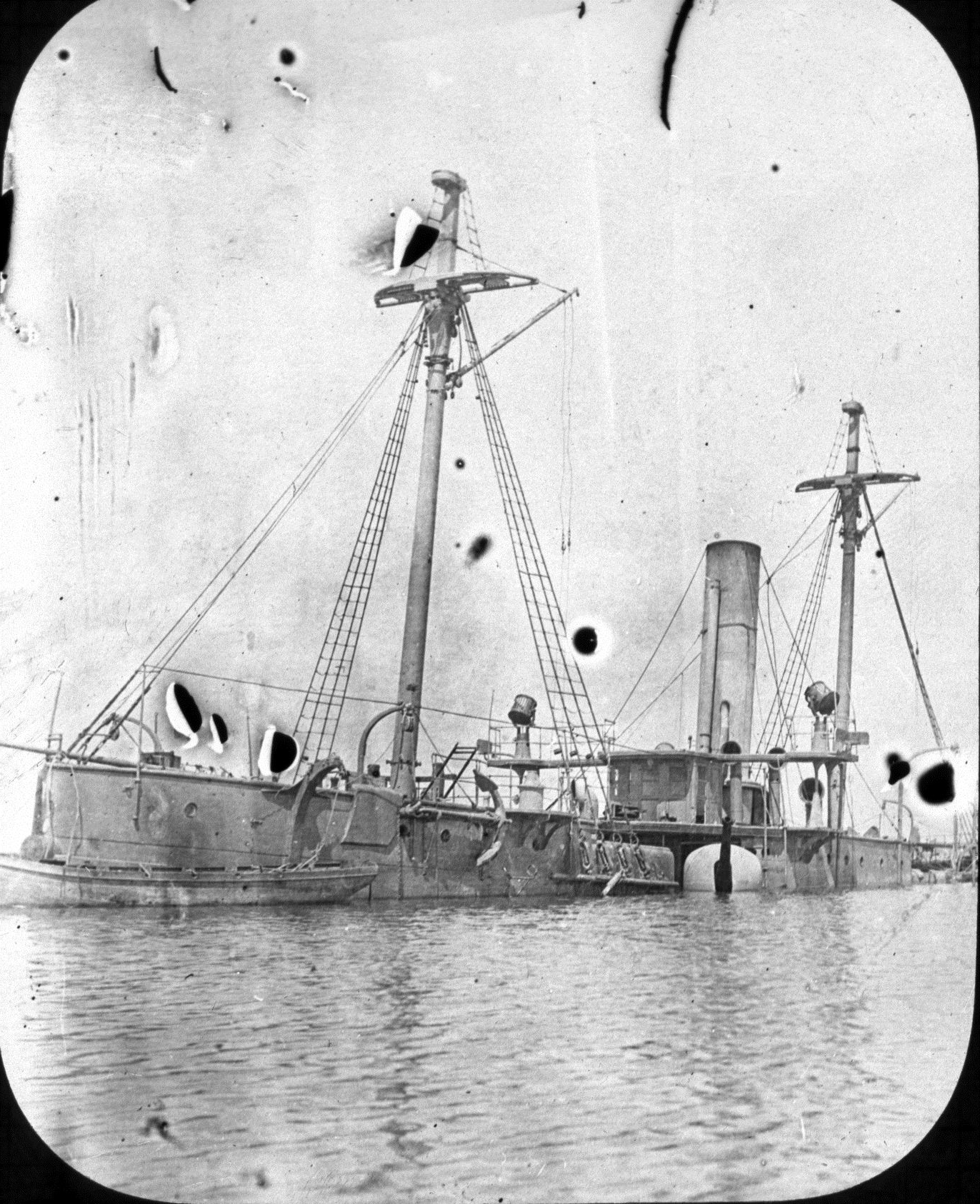
The wreck of Montojo's second flagship, Isla de Cuba

The American ships passed into Manila Bay without striking the few mines that the Spaniards had emplaced (the water was too deep and the waterway was too wide for them to be of much use), and aside from artillery fire from the guns on Corregidor island, they met little resistance. They entered the bay without loss. Meanwhile, the Spanish ships were anchored at the naval arsenal near Cavite, where Montojo, who was pessimistic on the battle, believed his men would have the best chance of survival. The engagement that followed between the Spanish squadron and the Americans became the first major naval battle that Montojo had fought in for over 30 years. The US squadron arrived near Cavite and engaged the Spanish on May 1, 1898, around 5:00 in the morning. By 5:40, despite fire from the shore artillery and Montojo's squadron, none of the US ships had been damaged. The American squadron returned fire and Montojo's flagship, the cruiser Reina Cristina, sustained heavy damage along with the rest of the Spanish ships, forcing him to move his flag to the Isla de Cuba. The captain of a British steamer that was then passing noted, "[Montojo] stood upright in the stern perfectly unmoved, although splashes of water flew repeatedly over the little craft.... it was an example of unparalleled heroism."

By 7:30 in the morning, the Asiatic Squadron withdrew to restock its ammunition and provide rest for the crew. The only American casualties had been eight wounded aboard the USS Baltimore and one death on the USS McCulloch. After about three-and-a-half hours, at around 11:15 a.m., the American ships returned to face the Spaniards again. However, by then much of the Spanish squadron was destroyed and resistance was limited, and not long afterwards, the Spaniards surrendered. Montojo reported around 381 casualties for his squadron in total, and among the wounded was one of his two sons.

== Later life ==
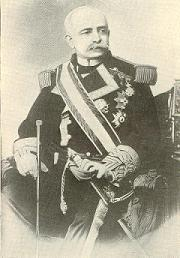
Admiral Montojo

After the defeat at Manila Bay, Contraalmirante Montojo was recalled to Madrid to be held as a scapegoat for the loss by the court-martial despite the circumstances that led to the defeat. He left Manila in October and arrived in November 1898. By decree of the court-martial, he was imprisoned in March 1899, but was later released. Among the testimony was Admiral George Dewey, to whom Montojo had sent a letter asking for assistance, and the American officer replied, "Although without accurate knowledge as to the condition of your ships, I have no hesitation in saying to you what I have already had the honor to report to my government, that your defense at Cavite was gallant in the extreme. The fighting of your flagship, which was singled out for attack, was especially worthy of a place in the traditions of valor of your nation." Montojo was later absolved of the charges but was still discharged from the Spanish Navy. In June 2017, a screenplay was written based on Montojo's court-martial and Admiral Dewey assisting him in March 1899.

He died in Madrid on September 30, 1917.

== Personal life ==
Montojo wrote a number of literary works and articles for various publications. Among those was León Aldao, A Critical Essay on the First Lands Discovered by Columbus, Encyclopedic Nautical Handbook, and translations of Angelo Secchi's book on physics and The Two Admirals by James Fenimore Cooper.

One of his nieces was Fermina Montojo Torrontegui, second wife of Enrique Zóbel de Ayala (born 1877), of the billionaire Zobel de Ayala family, original owners of Sotogrande. Her son and his grandson Fernando Zobel de Ayala y Montojo is the famous modern Filipino-Spanish painter.

== Awards ==
Grand Cross of the Order of Isabella the Catholic (Spain)
Military Order of María Cristina (Spain)

== See also ==
- Battles of the Spanish–American War

== Sources ==
- Dyal, Donald H. (1996). Historical Dictionary of the Spanish American War. Greenwood. ISBN 0313288526.
- Leeke, Jim (2009). Manila and Santiago: The New Steel Navy in the Spanish–American War. Naval Institute Press. ISBN 978-1591144649.
