= Jaime Zobel =

Jaime Zobel may refer to:

- Jaime Zóbel de Ayala (born 1934), Filipino businessman and photographer of German and Spanish descent
- Jaime Augusto Zóbel de Ayala (born 1959), Filipino businessman of German and Spanish parentage, son of the above
