= Fernando Zóbel =

Fernando Zóbel may refer to:

- Fernando Zobel de Ayala, president of Ayala Corporation
- Fernando Zóbel de Ayala y Montojo, artist
