= Jacobo Zóbel =

Filipino pharmacist

Jacobo Zangroniz Zóbel
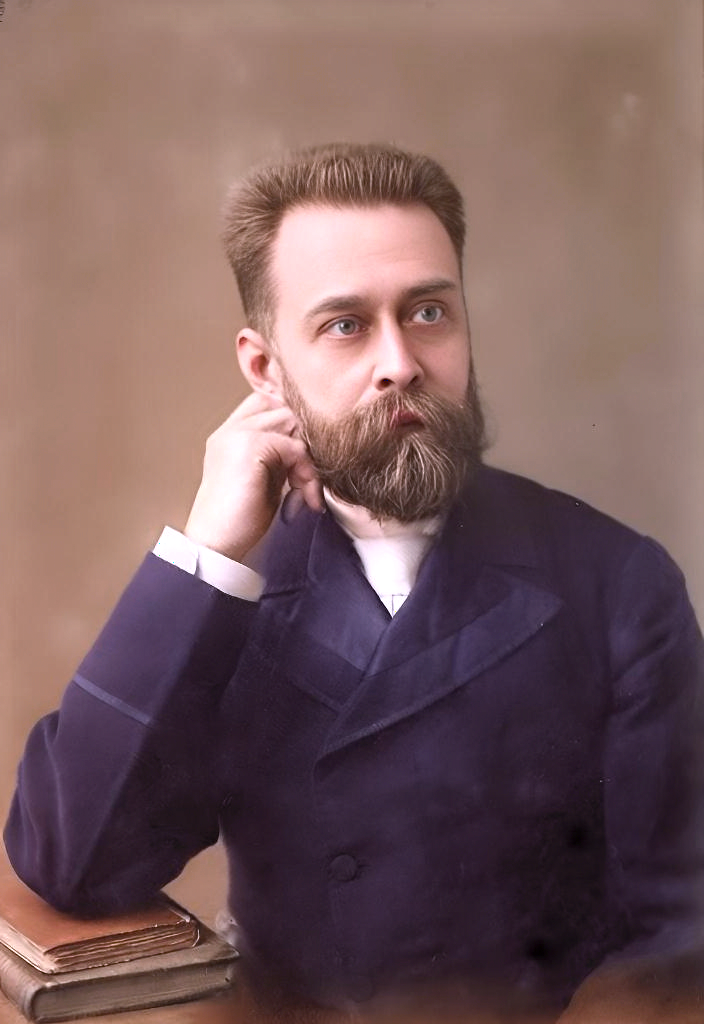
- Born: October 12, 1842; Manila, Captaincy General of the Philippines
- Died: October 7, 1896 (aged 53); Manila, Captaincy General of the Philippines
- Spouse: Trinidad Róxas de Ayala
- Children: 5, including Enrique
- Parents: Jacobo Hirsch Zóbel; Ana Zangroniz
- Family: Zóbel de Ayala

Jacobo Zangroniz Zóbel (October 12, 1842, Manila – October 7, 1896, Manila) was a Filipino pharmacist and businessman. He is the progenitor of the prominent Philippine Zóbel de Ayala family. He is also a lead figure in the rise of Filipino nationalism.

== Biography ==
Zóbel was born on October 12, 1842, in the Philippine capital of Manila. He was the only son in a family of three children of the German immigrant Jacobo Hirsch Zóbel and the Spanish Ana Zangroniz-Zobel, a daughter of a judge of the Real Audiencia of Manila. His father worked in Manila as a pharmacist, with his own pharmacy under the name Botica de Don Jacob Hirsch Zóbel on Calle Real in Intramuros. His grandfather, Johannes Andreas Zóbel, arrived in the Philippines from Hamburg, Germany in 1832, together with his wife, Cornelia Hirsch-Zobel, and their son, Don Jacobo Hirsch Zobel. Johannes Andreas Zóbel came from a long line of German pharmacists and established the Botica Zóbel pharmacy in 1834, located in Calle Real 28 in Intramuros.

Zóbel grew up in Germany and completed a study of pharmacy at the Universidad Central de Madrid. He also studied to become a civil engineer. A study that he did not fully complete. He also took up natural sciences. It was there he explored his lifelong fascination with medicine, chemistry and archaeology. In doing so, he mastered eleven languages. He befriended the young numismatist Don Antonio Delgado (1805–1879) from Madrid, who inspired his scholarship on antiquarian coins. He traveled to several museums in Europe to research more about his collecting hobby and he published the classic monograph titled Memoria Sobre Las Monedas Libiofenicias o Teudetanas which is still published and used in Spanish universities to this day. He graduated from the university in 1864. In 1863, Zóbel returned to the Philippines. From early 1866, Zóbel took over the management of the Botica from his father, who died at sea between Europe and the United States in November of that year during a voyage with one of his sisters. Zóbel was mayor of the city of Manila for a time during the period of Governor-General Carlos María de la Torre y Navacerrada. His term as mayor ended on December 31, 1870.

Brought up as a liberal, Zóbel welcomed his appointment by Governor General de la Torre as a member of the Manila Municipal Board and the Sociedad Económica de los Amigos del País. During his term, Zóbel introduced many liberal reforms: public schools, the first tree-planting activities and campaigned for representation in the Spanish Cortes and also promoted equal opportunity for all Filipinos, Creoles or natives alike. He also opened the first public reading room and library during his term. In 1872, following the outbreak of the revolution, Zóbel was arrested during the Cavite mutiny for alleged complicity. He was imprisoned in Fort Santiago for several months on the charge of sedition. He was cited also for possession of firearms and revolutionary pamphlets. Due to his German nationality and the intervention of the German consulate, he was eventually released. The Prince of Bismarck made representations to the Spanish government to have him released. He was acquitted in February 1875 by the Real Audiencia of Manila for lack of evidence. On February 5, 1875, Zóbel married Trinidad Roxas Ayala-Zobel, the youngest daughter of husband Antonio de Ayala and Margarita Roxas-Ayala (the eldest child of Domíngo Ureta Róxas). The couple then traveled to Japan, where he studied the government and education system for several months. They then spent some time in the United States, where they visited the 1876 World’s Fair. The couple decided to live briefly in Spain after Jacobo decided to study transportation systems in Europe, and he renewed his numismatic research, publishing a major work entitled Estudio Histórico de la Moneda Antigua Española Desde Su Origen Hasta El Imperio Romano in 1878 (Historical Study of Ancient Spanish Coins from Their Origin to the Roman Empire).

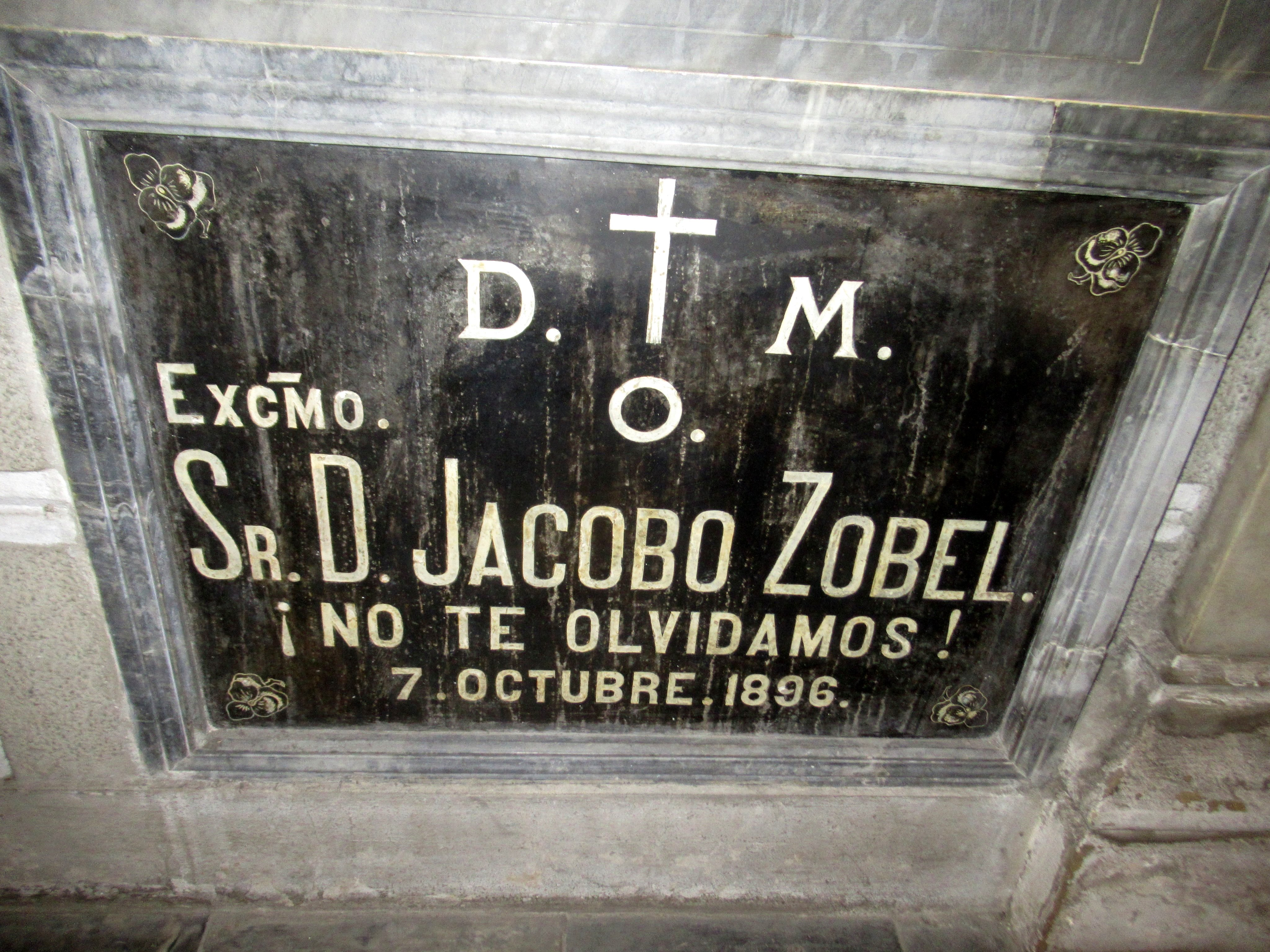
Zóbel's tomb in San Agustin Church Manila.

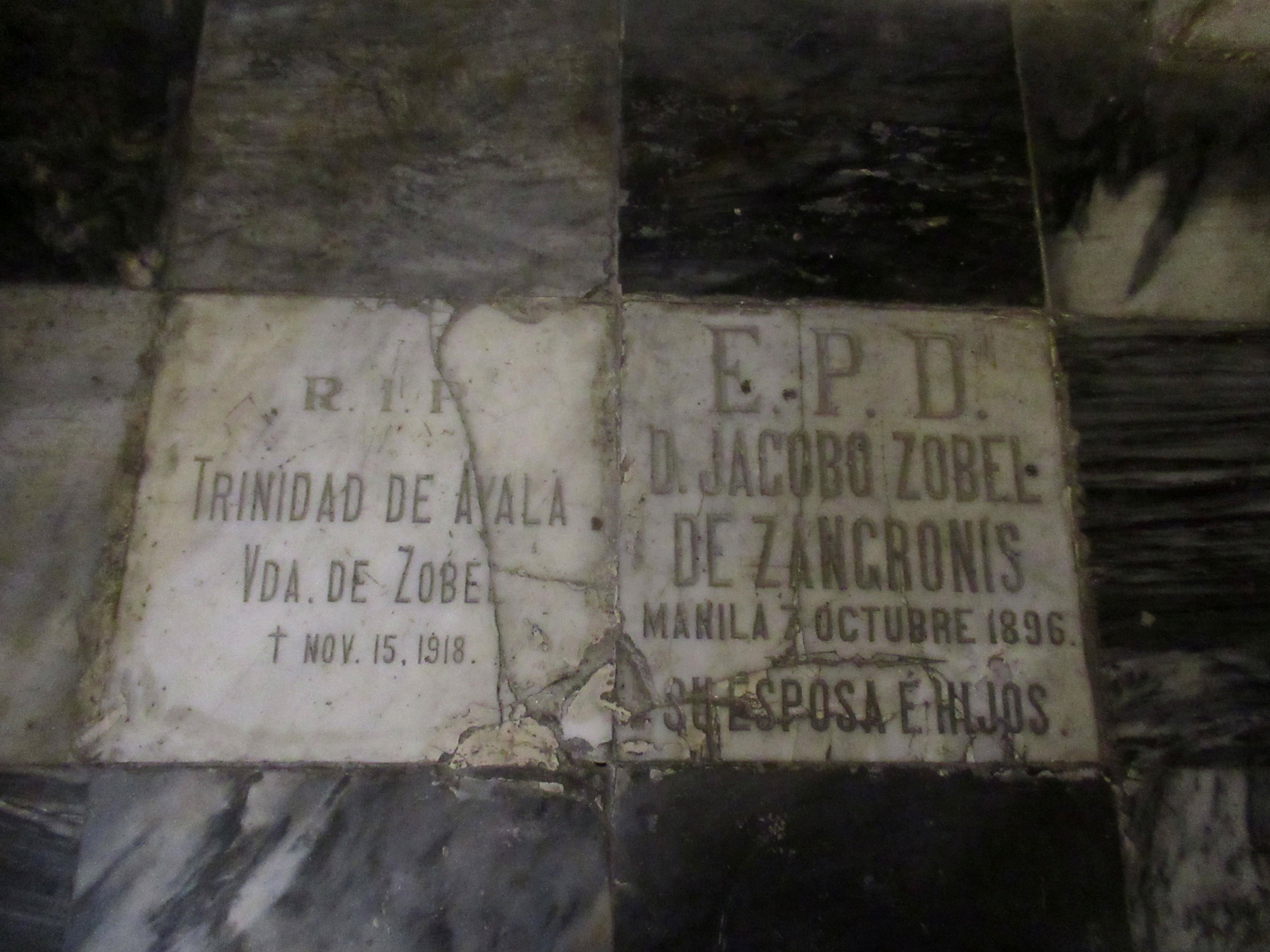
Trinidad Roxas Ayala-Zobel & Zóbel's grave at San Agustin Church (Manila).

Around 1880, Zóbel returned to the Philippines. He became a representative of Eiffel et Cie. of Paris and built the Ayala Bridge in Manila. Ayala y Compañía (the successor-in-interest to Casa Róxas) was established in 1876 and Zóbel became one of its partners until 1891. He was appointed member of the Consejo de Administración by the King of Spain on May 25, 1882. He was also member of the Sociedad Económica de los Amigos del País, a conciliario (adviser) of Banco Español Filipino and the secretary of the Cámara de Comercio de Manila. He became a member of the prestigious Real Academia de la Historia from 1865 to 1896. He received numerous awards, including the Gran Cruz de la Real Orden Americana de Isabel la Catolica in 1880, the Caballero de la Orden de Carlos III, and knight-commander of the Order of the Northern Star of Sweden and Norway. There he built several temporary bridges over the Pasig. He was also responsible for the Quinta Bridge and the Ayala Bridge on behalf of Eiffel & Co. from Paris. On June 7, 1881, he obtained a permit to construct five tram lines in Manila and its surroundings. He started with a tram line (with horse-drawn trams) from Tondo to Manila, which was later extended to Malabon. His capitalist partner was the Spanish banker Don Adolfo Bayo and his local partner was one of the richest Filipinos of the time, Don Gonzalo Tuason. Eventually, he built four other major tram lines in Manila and its vicinity (Malate, Sampaloc to Tondo), drawn by horses. Zóbel died in 1896 while under suspicion once again of supporting the Philippine revolution.

== See also ==
- History of the Philippines
- History of the Philippines (1565–1898)

== Sources ==
- Galang, Zoilo M. (1950). Encyclopedia of the Philippines. Vol. 3 (3 ed.). Manila: E. Floro.
- Villarroel, Hector K. (1965). Eminent Filipinos. National Historical Commission.
- Arsenio, Manuel E. (1970). Dictionary of Philippine Biography. Vol. 2. Quezon City: Filipiniana Publications.
- Quirino, Carlos (1995). Who's who in Philippine history. Manila: Tahanan Books.
