= Sotogrande =

- Residential area
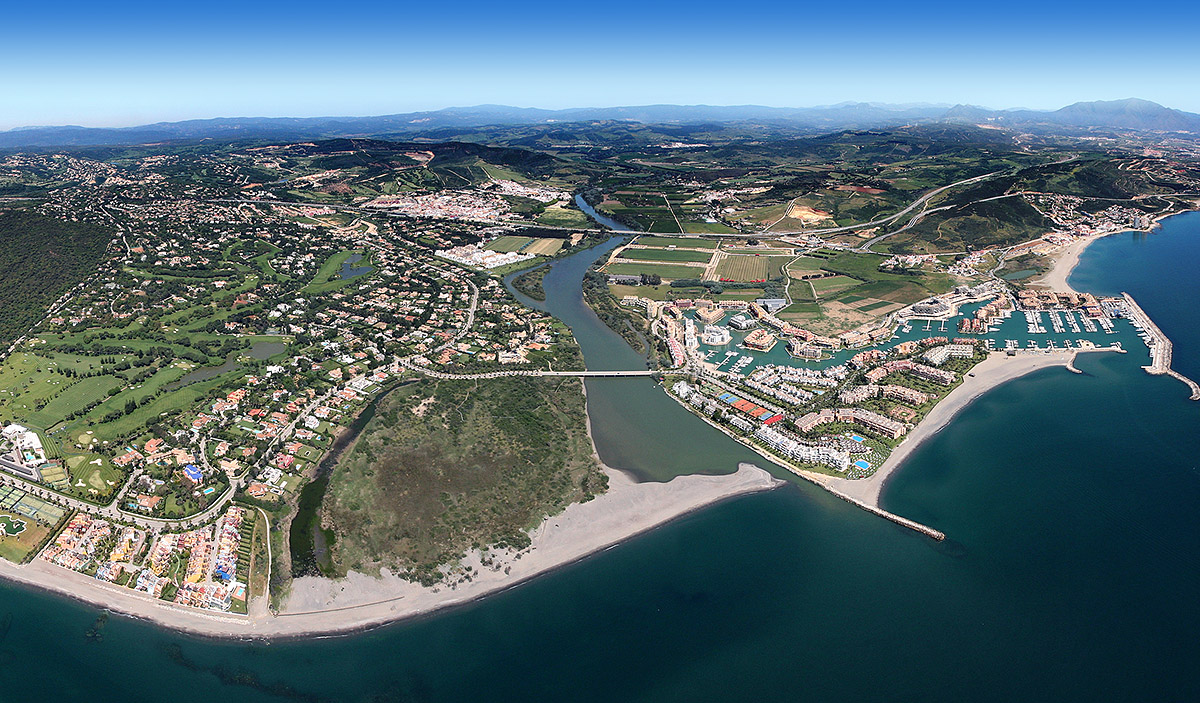
- Sotogrande aerial view, July 2011

- Location in the Province of Cádiz Sotogrande (Andalusia) Sotogrande (Spain)
- Coordinates: 36°29′44″N 5°32′07″W
- Country: Spain
- Autonomous community: Andalusia
- Province: Cádiz
- Comarca: Campo de Gibraltar
- Municipality: San Roque
- Established: 1964

Population (2025)
  - Total: 3,292
- Time zone: UTC+1 (CET)
  - Summer (DST): UTC+2 (CEST)
- Postal code: 11310
- Official language(s): Spanish
- Website: Official website

Sotogrande is the largest privately owned residential development in Andalusia, Spain. It is a private community in the municipality of San Roque. Located 25 km (16 mi) northeast of Gibraltar, Sotogrande is composed of a 25-square-kilometre (9.7 sq mi) stretch from the Mediterranean Sea back into the foothills of Sierra Almenara, providing contrasting views of sea, hills, cork forests and green fairways, including the Rock of Gibraltar and Morocco.

== History ==
To build a city similar to Palm Springs in southern Europe, Sotogrande was developed by the industrialist couple from the Philippines, José McMicking and Mercedes Zóbel, with support from their nephews Jaime Zóbel and Enrique Zóbel. The McMickings, having seen the idyllic coasts in 1962, acquired five neighboring farms with the idea of creating a luxurious residential development by the Mediterranean. In May 2006, Sotogrande was featured in The Times as having the most expensive homes in Europe. There are a number of artificial lakes and five golf courses, including the Valderrama Golf Club created by Jaime Ortiz-Patiño and the San Roque course. The port was established in 1988.

== Architecture ==
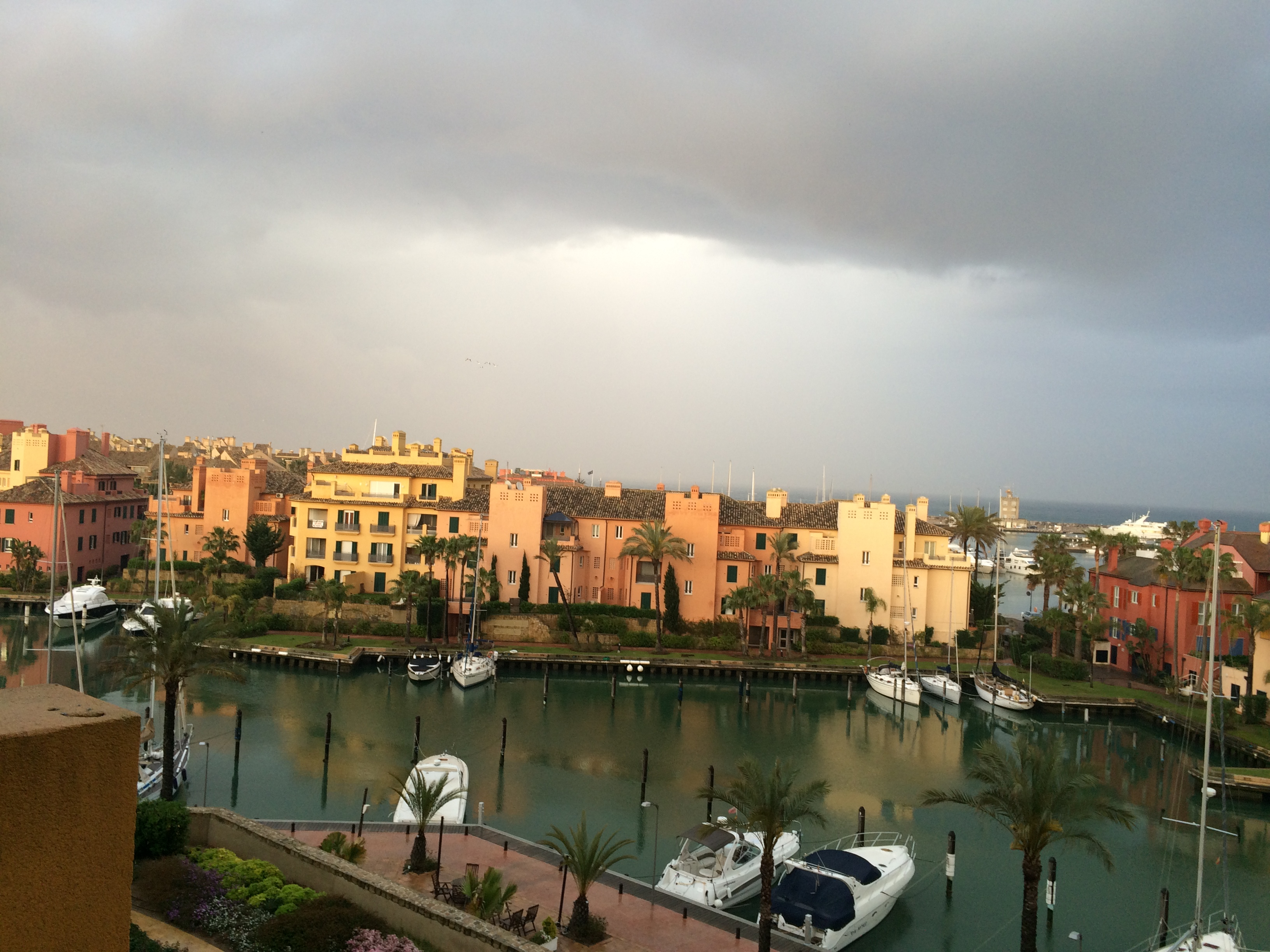
View of Sotogrande port

Sotogrande is well known as an architectural showcase on the Costa del Sol, with styles varying from the traditional Andalusian to mid-century modern, to more modern and unusual designs, including moorish/mudéjar style homes and a Swiss chalet. In 2008, the local government declared three buildings as of cultural interest, protecting them from reform or demolition. These included the Biddle House by Francisco Javier Carvajal, the Zóbel house by José Antonio Coderch, and the Real Club de Golf by Luis Gutierrez Soto.

A specially built man-made lagoon is part of the newest developments in Sotogrande within the La Reserva gated residential community in the hills of Sotogrande.

== Nature ==
River Guadiaro and Estuary, Sotogrande, a natural area of 27 hectares and the only marshland on this part of the coast, has been designated as an Andalusian national park, wildlife and nature reserve. The reserve often hosts migratory birds on their route to and from Africa.

== Economy ==
Sotogrande seems to have kept its head above the crisis. Finanzas, a Spanish finance publication, says that whilst prices in other areas of the Costa del Sol have taken a fall to the tune of −11.4% in Torremolinos, −10.99% in Fuengirola, −7.4% in Manilva, −5.5% in Casares, and −3.4% in Mijas Costa. In Sotogrande average property prices have remained the same or increased, in some cases up to 45%. This phenomenon is attributed to the financial status of the residents of the urbanization.

== Real Estate ==
Sotogrande is recognised for its stable and high-value property market, attracting international buyers seeking luxury villas, golf-front estates, and marina residences. Despite fluctuations in nearby Costa del Sol areas, premium real estate in Sotogrande has historically shown strong resilience. Rhead Estates, a local real-estate agency, specialises in luxury villas for sale throughout Sotogrande.

== Residents ==
Some of the richest families of Spain, Russia, and the United Kingdom reside in Sotogrande. Current and past regulars (with second homes) or permanent inhabitants include Peter Caruana, former Chief Minister of Gibraltar, Fabian Picardo, current Chief Minister of Gibraltar, Tony Blair, Emilio Botín, Ana Botin, Ana Rosa Quintana, The Warwickshire's Captain Nov 2024 - August 2025 (citation needed) Glenn Harrison Royal Shakespeare Company actor Mike Gwilym, Vladimir Gusinsky, Boris Berezovsky, as well as Prince Louis Alphonse, Duke of Anjou, a pretender to the throne of France or former footballers such as Glenn Hoddle or Glen Johnson.

== Scandal ==
Recorded by Spanish secret services, Vladimir Putin illegally entered Spain at Sotogrande by private boat via plane flights from London to Gibraltar several times while he was head of Russia's FSB during the 1990s.

Spanish police arrested several Russian mafia with residences at Sotogrande during Operation Troika.
