= Rocio Urquijo =

Spanish artist (1935–2009)

Rocio Urquijo (Madrid, 21 April 1935 – 9 March 2009) was a Spanish artist and first wife of Filipino industrialist Enrique J. Zobel.

== Biography ==
Rocio Novales Urquijo-Zobel was born to Rosario Novales and Francisco Urquijo. She married the Filipino industrialist and former CEO of the Ayala Corporation, Enrizue J. Zobel, with whom she had two children, Iñigo and Mercedes.

== Art ==
=== Inspiration ===
Urquijo's works were influenced by the interior design, architecture, and folk arts of Indonesia, Mexico, and South America. Her geometric designs were inspired by the carved and painted doors that are commonly found in Sumatra and Bali. The series Oaxaca was influenced by the designs of the Maya.

Urquijo's mixed media works are typically minimal and characterized by geometric shapes and a high-contrast colour palette.

=== Studies ===
- 1965–1966: Understudy to Lee Aguinaldo, artist, Manila, Philippines
- 1968–1969: Understudy to José Hernández, artist, Madrid, Spain
- 1969–1970: Print making with Pandy Aviado, artist, Madrid, Spain; Print-Making with Michael Ponce de León, artist, Casa Americana, Madrid, Spain

=== Exhibitions ===
Urquijo exhibited in galleries in Spain, Venezuela, New York City, Singapore, the Philippines, Morocco, and Italy. Her artwork is held in various public and private collections.

=== Solo exhibitions ===
- 2002: Book launch and signing; Rocio Urquijo, Wally Findlay Galleries, New York, New York
- 1998: Nature, Form, Color, Wally Findlay Galleries, Palm Beach, Florida
- 1998: Color, City, Door, Philippine Center, New York, New York
- 1998: Exposicíon de Pictura, Instituto Cervantes, Milan, Italy
- 1997: Patios and Doors, Instituto Cervantes, Manila, Philippines
- 1991: Inaguración, Galería Félix, Caracas, Venezuela
- 1983: Caesium, Fine Art Gallery, Singapore
- 1983: Rocio Urquijo, Luz Gallery, Manila, Philippines
- 1981: Drawings of Rocio Urquijo, Hastings Gallery, Queen Sofia Spanish Institute, New York, New York
- 1979: Dibujos, Sala de Arte Jamete, Cuenca, Spain
- 1971: Información de Turismo, Casa de Cultura, Valencia, Spain
- 1970: Exposition Rocio Urquijo, Luz Gallery, Manila, Philippines

=== Group exhibitions ===
- 2001: The Art of Holiday Giving, Wally Findlay Galleries, New York, New York
- 1999: Inaugural East Hampton Exhibition, Wally Findlay Galleries, East Hampton, New York
- 1998: Women of Vision, Wally Findlay Galleries, Palm Beach, Florida
- 1996: Poesía Visual y Experimental, Casa del Teatro, Santo Domingo, Dominican Republic
- 1986: Inaguración, Sala Caniego, Mohedas de Granadilla, Spain
- 1985: Reenencuentro Hispano Puertorriqueño, Aula de la Columbia, Universidad de Salamanca, Salamanca, Spain
- 1985: Artistas de la Ciudad Encantatda, Casa de la Cultura, Cuenca, Spain
- 1985: Artistas Hispano-Americanos en Madrid, Lonja de la Casa del Reloj, Araganzuela, Madrid, Spain
- 1985: Artistas Hispano-Puertorriqueño de Artes Plasticas, Museo de la Universidad de Puerto Rico, Rio Piedras, Puerto Rico
- 1985: 1^{a} Body Space Muestra de Grabado, Ciudad de Alarcón, Madrid, Spain
- 1983: I Bienal Hispanoamericana de Dibujo y Grabado, Casa de la Entrevista, Alcalá de Henares, Spain
- 1983: I Bienal de Pintura y Escultura, Universidad Politécnica de Madrid, Madrid, Spain
- 1970: II Print Bienale, Kraków, Poland
- 1970: Becados del Washington Irving Institute, Madrid, Spain
- 1970: Eros 70, Galeria Vandres, Madrid, Spain
- 1969: ABU Group, Rocio Urquijo, Sala Honda, Cuenca, Spain

=== Awards ===
- 1970: 1st Prize, Etching, II Print Bienale, Kraków, Poland
- 1971: 1st Prize, Etching, Información de Turisimo, Valencia, Spain
- 1972: 1st Prize, Etching, Becados del Washington Irving Institute, Madrid, Spain
