= Enrique Zóbel de Ayala =

Spanish-born industrialist and philanthropist

Enrique P. Zóbel de Ayala
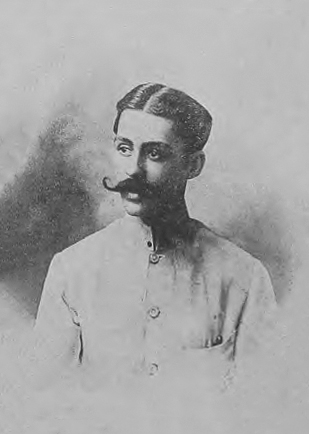
- Zóbel de Ayala, c. 1906
- Born: Enrique Jacobo Pedro Luis Plácido Zóbel de Ayala; October 9, 1877; Madrid, Spain
- Died: February 17, 1943 (aged 65); Manila, Second Philippine Republic
- Education: Colegio de San Juan de Letran, Real Colegio Alfonso XII
- Spouses: Consuelo Ayala Róxas (m. 1901; died 1907) Fermina Torronntegui Montojo (m. 1911)
- Children: 7, including Fernando
- Parents: Jacobo Zangroniz Zóbel; Trinidad Róxas de Ayala
- Family: Zóbel de Ayala

Enrique Jacobo Pedro Luis Plácido Zóbel de Ayala (October 9, 1877 – February 17, 1943) was a Spanish-born industrialist and philanthropist who became the first patriarch of the Zóbel de Ayala family. He was also one of the leaders in the Philippine Falange during the 1930s and 1940s.

== Early life ==
Enrique P. Zóbel de Ayala was born in Madrid, Spain, on October 9, 1877, to Jacobo Zóbel y Zangroniz and Trinidad de Ayala y Roxas. He had a twin, named Alfonso, who died the age of five. His other siblings were Fernando Antonio, Margarita and Gloria (who died a few months after her birth).

He studied at the Colegio de San Juan de Letran. He received a Bachelor of Arts degree from Real Colegio Alfonso XII in El Escorial, Spain. He pursued postgraduate studies at Liceo de San Luis and the Collège Sainte-Barbe, Paris. He was very much interested in engineering and mining, so he also took courses at the École Nationale Supérieure des Mines de Paris, Paris from 1897 to 1901. He also pursued the study of painting in the French capital.

== Personal life ==
He married his cousin Consuelo Roxas y Ayala in Manila on October 16, 1901. The couple had three children: Jacobo (father of Enrique J. Zóbel), Alfonso (father of Jaime P. Zóbel de Ayala I) and Mercedes (married to Joseph Rafael McMicking, whose mother was Angelina Ynchausti). The union was short-lived after Consuelo succumbed to cholera on September 25, 1907, at the age of 30. Her funerary plaque and remains (along with her father, mother, grandparents and contemporary members of the extended family) are still buried in the left inner wall of the ancient San Agustin Church of Intramuros, to this day.

He was a widower for three years when he met Fermina Torrontegui Montojo. She was the daughter of the Spanish admiral Patricio Montojo, who led the Spanish fleet against Commodore George Dewey in the Battle of Manila Bay. They were married on November 12, 1911, and had four children – Matilde (wife of Luis Albarracin Segura of Madrid), Consuelo (wife of 3-star American general James Dyce Alger of Hawaii, and of which Consuelo Foundation is named after), Gloria (wife of Ricardo Padilla Satrustegui of Sintra, Portugal and Barcelona, Spain and who held interests in the Compania General de Tabacos de Filipinas, Guell Park and Hacienda Luisita, as well as endowing the Comillas Pontifical University), and the great modernist painter Fernando Zóbel de Ayala y Montojo (and namesake of his brother, Fernando Antonio).

== Business career ==
He was a managing partner of Ayala y Compañia from 1901 to 1913 and from 1920 until 1943.

In 1914, his children from Consuelo – Jacobo, Alfonso and Mercedes – would inherit Hacienda San Pedro de Macati from his aunt (and mother of Consuelo), Carmen Róxas de Ayala. The property was first purchased in 1851 by his great uncle, Jose Bonifacio Róxas, for 52,800 pesos. It was inherited by Róxas' son, Pedro Pablo Róxas (and upon his death in 1912, by his widow, Carmen). In 1929, ownership of the property would be transferred to Ayala y Compañia. The property - which had lain in the family's hands, undeveloped and undisturbed for several decades - would serve as the basis of his family's future wealth. During the 1930s, portions of the property would be developed, as the company's initial foray into real estate development. In 1937, he offered 42 hectares of the property to be leased for the development of Nielson Field.

On June 21, 1924, the Ayala distillery (Destileria y Licoreria de Ayala y Compañia, maker of Ginebra San Miguel) was sold by Ayala y Compañia to La Tondeña Inc.

Aside from his involvement with the Ayala company, he also established La Porcelanica in 1903 – the first modern ceramics factory in the Philippines. The following year, he established a glass factory with Eduardo Soriano (father of Andrés Soriano Sr.). He co-founded Filipinas Compañía de Seguros in 1913 and ventured into insurance and finance as vice president of Insular Life Assurance Company, a director of Philippine Guaranty Co. and a director of Banco Español-Filipino.

== Cultural and philanthropic activities ==
Zóbel inherited the liberal ideas and interests of his father Don Jacobo Zóbel y Zangroniz. Like his father, he was educated in Europe, not only in business and sciences, but also in the arts. He loved the cultivation of the arts and culture. His mansion on Plaza del Carmen and Leon Guerrero Street in Ermita, Manila became the focal point of many tertulias and salon de artistas. He donated his vast collection of books on European literature to the University of the Philippines library.

He was the first modern Hispanist and founded Premio Zóbel in 1929 in order to preserve and promote the use of the Spanish language, which he believed was the true language of Filipino nationalists. His great obsession was the conservation of the spiritual ties between Spain and the Philippines through the promotion of its language and culture. Premio Zóbel was the fulfillment of his desire that "No quiero que el español muera en Filipinas". Today, Premio Zóbel is administered by his grandchildren, Georgina Padilla MacCrohon and Alejandro Padilla (both children of his daughter, Gloria).

Together with brother Fernando Antonio, he co-founded Casino Español de Manila, a socio-civic club for Hispano-Filipinos. He established the Patronato Escolar Español and the Asociación Pro-Idioma Hispano, both efforts directed at strengthening the role of Spanish in the educational system. He was a founding member of Academia Filipina de la Lengua Española in 1924, which became the correspondent of the prestigious Real Academia de la Lengua Española.

He dabbled as a Spanish-language publisher when he resuscitated the moribund El Mercantil. He supported the arts and gave scholarships, among them, a young Fernando Amorsolo, who in gratitude would teach his son, Fernando, the rudiments of art.

In 1930, he helped fund the construction of the Manila Metropolitan Theater, a landmark Art Deco building designed by Juan Arellano. He became the treasurer of the Metropolitan Theater Company.

In 1936, he reported the discovery of a horde of Oriental pottery found on his Calatagan, Batangas property to the National Museum director Eduardo Quisumbing and subsequently funded the ensuing excavations.

In April 1939, he was appointed by General Franco as the acting consul for Spain in the Philippines. The government of Spain, in admiration of his many philanthropic and cultural causes, awarded him La Gran Cruz Isabel la Católica and the Medalla del Mérito Civil.

== Death ==
Zóbel died on February 17, 1943, in Manila, at the height of the Japanese occupation during World War II. His funerary plaque and remains (along with those of his wife, his parents, grandparents and other contemporary members of the extended family) are still buried in the left inner wall of the ancient San Agustin Church of Intramuros, to this day.
