= Fernando Zóbel de Ayala y Montojo =

Spanish Filipino painter (1924–1984)

Fernando M. Zóbel de Ayala
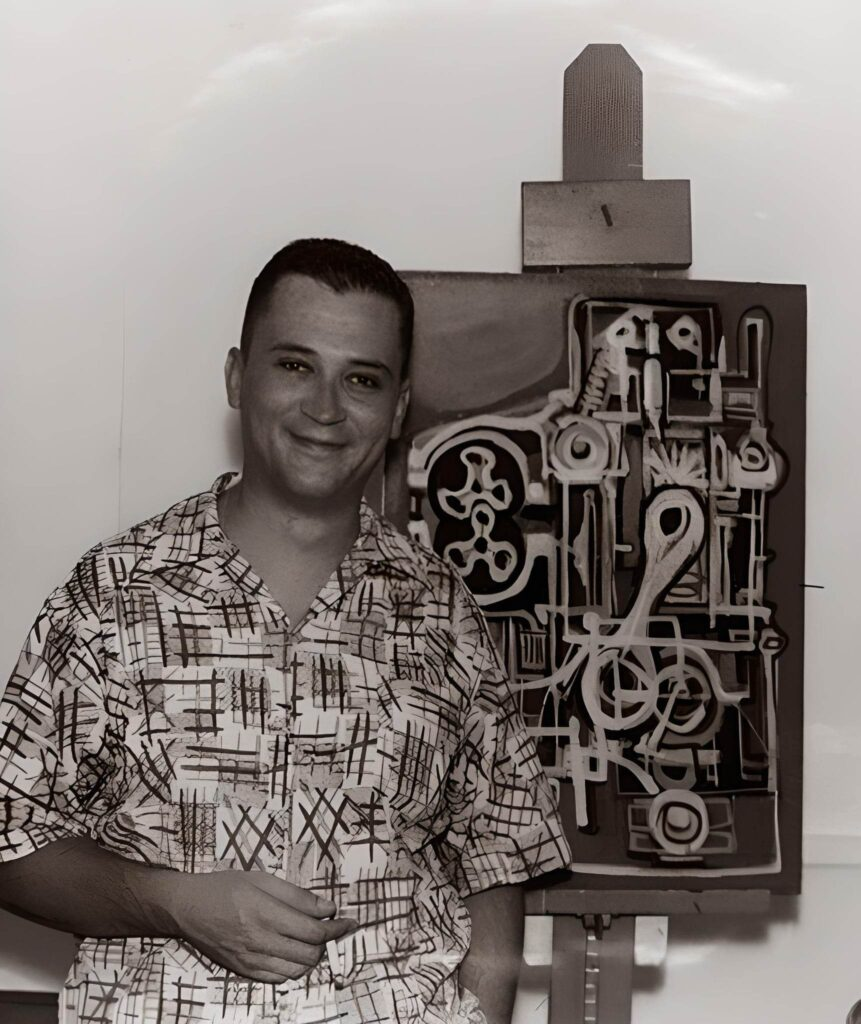
- Fernando Zóbel in 1953.
- Born: Fernando Montojo Zóbel de Ayala; August 27, 1924; Ermita, Manila, Philippine Islands
- Died: June 2, 1984 (aged 59); Rome, Italy
- Education: Harvard University
- Known for: Painting
- Movement: Modernism; Abstract Expressionism

Fernando Montojo Zóbel de Ayala (August 27, 1924 – June 2, 1984), also known as Fernando M. Zóbel, was a Spanish Filipino painter, businessman, art collector and museum founder.

== Early life ==
Fernando Montojo Zóbel de Ayala was born in Ermita, Manila in the Philippines to Enrique P. Zóbel de Ayala (1877–1943) and Fermina Torrontegui Montojo-Zóbel de Ayala and was a member of the prominent Zóbel de Ayala family. He was a brother of Jacobo Zangroniz Zóbel (father of Enrique J. Zóbel), Alfonso (father of Jaime P. Zóbel de Ayala, I) and Mercedes Zóbel-McMicking, all children of his father from his first wife, Consuelo Róxas de Zóbel de Ayala (who died on September 25, 1907, at the age of 30). He was a nephew and namesake of Fernando Antonio Zóbel de Ayala, the eldest brother of his father.

Zóbel initially pursued medical studies at the University of Santo Tomas in Manila. In 1942, he suffered from a spinal condition that left him bedridden. During his recovery, he began sketching and studied under the Filipino painter Fernando Amorsolo, whose works had been acquired by his father and who also acted as one of his patrons. Zóbel continued his studies at the University of Santo Tomas before transferring to Harvard University in 1946, where he pursued degrees in history and literature. In 1949, he completed his undergraduate degree in Humanities in three years, graduating magna cum laude with a thesis on Federico García Lorca’s play The Love of Don Perlimplín and Belisa in the Garden.

== Boston-style works ==
Zóbel started painting without formal training while in Harvard. In the fall of 1946 he met Jim Pfeufer and his wife Reed Champion Pfeufer. Reed was a painter who was loosely connected with the Boston School, and she became a mentor to the young artist. After finishing his bachelor's degree, he briefly returned to Harvard University to study law, and then worked as a curator at the Houghton Library. Zóbel's paintings from this era were representational, and often had an aspect of caricature.

== Early work in Manila and the influence of Rothko ==
Zóbel returned to the Philippines and became friends with contemporary Filipino modernist artists. As such, he collected modernist works and set up exhibits for them to be shown and noticed since modernist art was largely unappreciated. His first one-man exhibition was held at the Philippine Art Gallery in 1953. In 1954, he left Manila for six months, had a show at the Swetzoff Gallery in Boston and enrolled at the Rhode Island School of Design where he saw an exhibition by Mark Rothko. Rothko's paintings made an impression on Zobel that increased his interest in painting abstractly. When he returned to Manila, Zobel started in having interest in Chinese and Japanese art and took up calligraphy classes until 1960.

During this time, he joined the faculty of the Ateneo de Manila University and later was given an honorary doctorate and was made honorary director of the Ateneo Art Gallery for his contribution in education and as patron of the arts. In 1961, to make a name for himself as a full-time painter, he later resigned from his position in the Ayala Corporation and permanently moved to Spain.

== Saetas and Serie Negra series ==
Zóbel is best known for his first artwork series called the Saetas. Named after the liturgical song sung in Holy Week in Spain, they were developed for the most part in the Philippines. Zóbel faced the technical problem of how to achieve the lines that his theme required, lines that were, in his own words, "long, fine, and controlled." The artist's use of a surgical syringe to eject fine lines of paint was a hallmark of this series. After the Saetas, Zóbel began a series called Serie Negra or Series in Black influenced by Chinese Calligraphy. The Serie Negra was started in 1959 in Madrid and continued for four years.

== Later life and death ==
He founded the Museo de Arte Abstracto Español at Casa Colgadas in the town of Cuenca, Spain in 1966. The museum was expanded in 1978, and in 1980 Zóbel donated its collection to the Fundación Juan March, which then incorporated it into its own collection.

Zóbel was a mentor and collector who aided the careers of Spanish modernist painters including Antonio Lorenzo, Antoni Tàpies, Eusebio Sempere, Martín Chirino López, Antonio Saura and many others. In the late 1960s and early 1970s, Zóbel was working on a series of paintings called Dialogos which were his abstracted variations on paintings he admired in museums. He also made a series of paintings inspired by the Júcar River. After suffering a stroke that left him slightly impaired, he created a series called Las Orillas that elaborated on the theme of rivers.

In 1983, King Juan Carlos of Spain bestowed upon Zóbel, the Gold Medal of Merit in the Fine Arts, a prestigious award to individuals or institutions who have promoted the Spanish arts and culture. Soon after, Zóbel died of a heart attack while traveling in Rome, Italy on June 2, 1984, at the age of 59.

== Legacy ==
Since Zóbel's passing in 1984, the Ateneo Art Gallery in the Philippines and the Museo de Arte Abstracto Español in Spain, have become hallmarks of Spanish and Philippine modern and contemporary art. In 1967, the Ayala Museum originally envisioned by Zóbel to be a museum for Philippine history and iconography was established by the Filipinas Foundation (present-day Ayala Foundation).

From 17 December 1994 - 16 April 1995, the Museo de Arte Abstracto Español, Cuenca exhibited Fernando Zóbel. River Júcar, works created in a variety of mediums and produced between 1971 and 1984. The exhibit later traveled to Museo San Pío V, Valencia (20 April - 16 May 1995).

From 22 October 1999 - 2 May 2000, the Museo de Arte Abstracto Español, Cuenca exhibited Fernando Zóbel. Graphic Work. The show displayed prints and proofs of some of Zóbel’s work. The show was later seen at the Museu Fundación Juan March, Palma (16 May - 1 July 2000).

In 2003, a retrospective was held at the Museo Nacional Centro de Arte Reina Sofía in Madrid. The exhibition had a special exhibition tour at the Casa Museo Zavala in Cuenca and the Sala de Exposiciones de la Caja de San Fernando in Seville.

For his contributions in the arts, Philippine President Gloria Macapagal Arroyo posthumously awarded Zóbel, the Presidential Medal of Merit in 2006.

In 2022, a large retrospective titled Zóbel: The Future of the Past was presented at the Museo del Prado in Madrid, organised in collaboration with the Fundación Juan March and the Ayala Foundation. The exhibition brought together 178 works from collections in Spain, the Philippines, and the United States. It traced Zóbel’s career as a central figure in Spanish painting of the second half of the 20th century and contextualizes his art in the development of Spanish art. The exhibition was later shown in 2024 at the Ayala Museum in Manila, where the focus shifted to Zóbel’s Philippine period. The Philippine iteration included around 200 works, among them previously unseen sketchbooks, highlighting his contributions to modern art in the Philippines and his role in shaping contemporary cultural dialogues.

A third version, titled Fernando Zóbel: Order is Essential, opened in 2025 at the National Gallery Singapore. Featuring more than 200 works—including paintings, drawings, prints, photographs, and archival materials—the exhibition was organised across two galleries with a prologue and four thematic sections. The exhibition traced the evolution of Zóbel’s forms and ideas across Spain, the Philippines, and the United States, emphasising his international practice and the dialogue between place, history, and technique.

From 22 June - 8 October 2023, the Museo de Arte Abstracto Español, Cuenca exhibited Zóbel: Memory of an Instant, Zóbel's notebooks. The exhibit featured the film, Zóbel: Memory of an Instant, as well as some of Zóbel's notebooks and later traveled to Museu Fundación Juan March Palma (9 April - 19 October 2024). The film was screened as part of the exhibition Zóbel: The Future of the Past at the Museo Nacional del Prado, Ayala Museum in Manila and the National Gallery in Singapore.

=== Record prices at auction ===
Works by Zóbel have achieved record prices at auctions with the growth of the Philippine and Southeast Asian art market. On April 6, 2013, Hattecvm, a work from 1949 previously in a European private collection was sold for a record of ₱43.460 million (US$1,056,082) at a Sotheby's auction in Hong Kong. This was subsequently followed by a record price set on May 25, 2013, by Aracili, a similar work from 1959 that sold for ₱37.467 million (US$900,773.20) at a Christie's auction in Hong Kong.

Since then, his works have consistently increased in prices at auction in the Philippines and overseas. In 2015, Seated Man (Nothing III), an early 1953 work by Zóbel in the collection of his longtime friends Jim and Reed Pfeufer was sold at the Leon Gallery auction in Manila for a record ₱30.368 million.

Subsequently, this record has been broken a 1959 work titled Saeta 52 (Pared Madrileña) from the Saeta series sold for ₱35.040 million at a Leon Gallery auction in Manila on September 8, 2018. On 30 November 2019, a 1962 work by Zobel titled Perales de Tajuña was sold at Leon Gallery Fine Art and Antiques in Manila for a reached similar result for ₱35.040 million.

On 10 September 2022, Siga-Siga, an early 1952 work by Zóbel that previously was in the collection of his nephew Enrique J. Zóbel was sold at the Leon Gallery auction in Manila for a world record price of ₱44.384 million. The winning bidder was revealed to be Iñigo U. Zóbel, son of Enrique J. Zóbel and great-nephew of the artist.

== Honours ==
=== National honours ===
- Philippines:
  - Presidential Medal of Merit - posthumous (2006)
- Spain:
  - Gold Medal of Merit in the Fine Arts (1983)

== Bibliography ==
- Magaz Sangro, Antonio (1959). Zóbel: Pintura y dibujos (Reprint 2015 ed.). Madrid: Galería Cayón. ISBN 978-84-606-8134-2.
- Paras-Perez, Rod. (1990). Fernando Zóbel. Manila: Eugenio Lopez Foundation, Inc. ISBN 971-1005-29-8.
- Pérez-Madero, Rafael (2003). Zobel. Madrid: Museo Nacional Centro de Arte Reina Sofía. ISBN 978-84-15931-27-0.
- Samson, Ditas R. (2014). Journey into Space: The Visual Odyssey of Fernando Zóbel. Manila: Ayala Foundation, Inc. ISBN 978-971-8551-92-9.
- Seed, John; Ocampo, Ambeth R. (2015). The Jim and Reed Pfeufer Collection: A Four-Decade Friendship with Fernando Zóbel. Manila: León Gallery Fine Art and Antiques.
- Pereda, Felipe; Fontán del Junco, Manuel, eds. (2022). Zóbel: The Future of the Past. Madrid: Museo Nacional del Prado. ISBN 978-84-8480-582-3.
- Samson, Ditas R. (2023). Landscape into Painting: Fernando Zóbel Serie Blanca. Manila: Vibal Foundation, Inc. and Ayala Foundation, Inc. ISBN 978-971-97-0823-0.
- Pereda, Felipe; Fontán del Junco, Manuel; Capistrano-Baker, Florina H., eds. (2024). Zóbel: The Future of the Past – The Routes of a Cosmopolitan. Manila: Ayala Foundation, Inc. ISBN 978-621-8028-31-9.
- Chikiamco, Clarissa; Flores, Patrick; Fontán del Junco, Manuel; Pereda, Felipe, eds. (2025). Fernando Zóbel: Order is Essential. Singapore: National Gallery Singapore. ISBN 978-981-94-1228-0.
