= Enrique Zobel =

Filipino businessman, pilot and polo player

Enrique J. Zóbel
- Born: Enrique Jacobo Emilio Olgado Zóbel; January 7, 1927; Manila, Philippine Islands
- Died: May 17, 2004 (aged 77); Alabang, Muntinlupa, Philippines
- Education: De La Salle College; The American School; UCLA

Enrique Jacobo Emilio Olgado Zóbel (January 7, 1927 – May 17, 2004), better known as Enrique J. Zóbel and EZ, was a prominent Filipino businessman, pilot, and polo player belonging to the prominent Zóbel de Ayala family who are of Spanish and German descent.

== Early life ==
The only child of Col. Jacob Zobel y Roxas and Ángela Olgado y Calvo, he was a grandson and namesake of Enrique Zóbel de Ayala.

After the Japanese forces entered Manila in 1941, the 14-year-old Enrique displayed his resourcefulness and audacity, having to care for his mother while his father was with the USAFFE forces in Bataan. To generate income for their daily needs, he used his father's polo ponies to offer kalesa rides and even befriended General Ota, the head of the Kempeitai in the process.

He became the favorite of his aunt, Mercedes Z. McMicking, and her husband, Col. Joseph McMicking. Mercedes Z. McMicking was matriarch of the Zóbel de Ayala family after the deaths of her brothers, Jacobo and Alfonso. The couple took interest in his education and growth and groomed him, together with other clan members for the family businesses.

== Career ==
Zóbel joined Ayala y Compañia in 1955 and worked closely with his uncle, Col. McMicking, who was credited for engineering the transformation of Makati from vast tracts of swamplands into the Philippines' premier financial and commercial district. When the Ayala y Compañia partnership became a corporation in 1967 (after the retirement of Col. McMicking), Zóbel became its first chief executive. Like McMicking, Zóbel showed great strength and business savvy in contributing to the growth of Ayala as one of the Philippines' biggest and most respected conglomerates. He sustained McMicking's vision for the Ayala group.

He professionalized the Ayala group and was instrumental in fulfilling Ayala's goal to become a major player in the banking sector, as the company gained control of the Bank of the Philippine Islands. Ayala also moved into new industries – semiconductor (Integrated Micro-Electronics, Inc.), food processing (Pure Foods Corporation – now, San Miguel Pure Foods Company, Inc.), agribusiness (Darong (formerly Ayala) Agricultural Development Corporation) and telecommunications (Globe-Mackay Cable & Radio Corporation – now, Globe Telecom). In 1973, Zóbel welcomed the Mitsubishi group as partners and took Ayala Corporation public in 1976. On November 8, 1976, Ayala Corporation was listed in the Makati Stock Exchange (now Philippine Stock Exchange).

In 1981, he founded the Makati Business Club (MBC) with Jose V. Romero Jr., Rogelio Pantaleon and Bernardo Villegas to support or oppose policies which affected national life. He felt that the business community needed to speak out as a single solid voice and not lobby for its own corporate or sectoral interest. From 1983 to 1986, MBC would be the prime advocate of political change.

In 1983, he fought with his third cousin Andrés Soriano, Jr. for control of San Miguel Corporation (SMC). After losing the battle for control, he sold the Zóbel de Ayala family's shares (equivalent to 19% of SMC) in SMC to Eduardo Cojuangco, Jr. His controversial move was met with the displeasure of his aunt, Doña Mercedes, and cost him his position at Ayala. He was succeeded by his first cousin Jaime Zóbel de Ayala in 1984.

On his own, he took on projects of unprecedented dimensions in 1984, building the Istana Nurul Iman (official residence of the Sultan of Brunei, Hassanal Bolkiah) at a total cost of around US$1.4 billion under his company, Ayala International, Inc.

== Philanthropy ==
The De La Salle-Santiago Zobel School located in Ayala Alabang (an Ayala real estate development) was named in memory of son, Jacobo Santiago "Santi" U. Zobel (1954–1965), who died of pneumonia at the age of 11.

In 1990, he established the Enrique J. Zóbel Foundation, which focuses on social and economic development projects in Calatagan, Batangas.

== Military service ==
He was a pilot and reserve officer in the Philippine Air Force with the rank of colonel.

== Politics ==
Zobel, a "close Marcos confidante and supporter" who later on withdrew such support, outlined in a sworn statement made in October 1999, that the latter had around US$ 35 billion worth of gold bars as part of an overall estimated total wealth of USD 100 billion in 1989 values/purchasing power parity.

== Later life ==
On May 10, 1991, Zóbel suffered a spinal injury and was paralyzed from the waist down after an accident in Sotogrande, Spain while playing polo. He had to stop all physical activities and instead devoted his time to his foundation.

He was a recipient of the TOFIL Award in 2001.

He was a consummate pilot and was equally at home with jets and propeller airplanes. Even just before his death, he was looking for a small jet that could fly the distance from Manila to Hawaii, where he had a vacation home.

== Personal life ==
He was first married to Rocío Novales Urquijo-Zobel with whom he had three children – Jácobo Santiago "Santi" U. Zobel(1954–1965), María de las Mercedes U. Zobel, and Iñigo U. Zobel. He later separated from Urquijo and married Dee Anne Hora-Zobel, an American. After his death, Hora became the chairwoman of the Enrique Zóbel Foundation and continued his philanthropic works.

He was also known by his employees as a fluent Tagalog speaker with a twist of Batangueño accent given his sojourn in Batangas.

== Death ==
Zóbel died on May 17, 2004, at the age of 77.

== Posthumous ==
Zóbel was an avid polo player and was the first Filipino president of Manila Polo Club (1963–1964). In honor of his memory, the East Polo Field of the club was renamed Enrique J. Zóbel Field on January 9, 2005. The Enrique J. Zóbel Memorial Polo Cup was launched on January 30, 2005, at the club and has been held annually since.
