= Top Frontier Investment Holdings =

Philippine holding company

Top Frontier Investment Holdings Inc.
- Type: Public
- Traded as: PSE: TFHI
- Founded: 2008
- Headquarters: Makati, Metro Manila, Philippines
- Key people: Iñigo U. Zóbel, (Chairman); Ramón S. Ang, (President and CEO)
- Revenue: ₱725.78 billion PHP (2020)
- Net income: ₱23.62 billion PHP (2020)
- Total assets: ₱2.03 trillion PHP (2020)
- Number of employees: 18,656 (2019)
- Website: www.topfrontier.com.ph

Top Frontier Investment Holdings, Inc. (PSE: TFHI) is a Philippine holding company based in Makati, Metro Manila. Through two primary holdings, the company is active in mining, packaging, real estate, food and beverage. In 2017, the company was ranked 1228th on the Forbes Global 2000. The company was incorporated on March 11, 2008 and became listed in the Philippine Stock Exchange in 2014.

== Holdings ==
- San Miguel Corporation - 59.73%
- Clariden Holdings, Inc. - 100%
