= Andrés Soriano Jr. =

Spanish Filipino businessman

President of the Philippine Football Association
- In office 1969–1981
- Preceded by: Luis Javellana

Personal details
- Born: Andrés Montemar Soriano Jr. May 3, 1926 Manila, Philippine Islands
- Died: March 18, 1984 (aged 57) Madrid, Spain
- Occupation: Businessman, sports executive and patron

Andrés Montemar Soriano Jr. (May 3, 1926 – March 18, 1984) was a Spanish Filipino businessman best known as the chief executive of San Miguel Corporation and A. Soriano Corporation (ANSCOR) from 1964 to 1984. He was a son of Andrés Soriano Sr.

== Education ==
Soriano studied in the United States. He attended Lawrenceville School in New Jersey and the Wharton School of Finance at the University of Pennsylvania, where he obtained a bachelor's degree in economics.

== Involvement in football ==
Soriano would inherit his father's advocacy in Philippine football, continuing San Miguel Corporation's (SMC) football programs. Succeeding Luis Javellana, he would become the longest serving president of the Philippine Football Association holding the position from 1969 to 1981. He would complement the PFA with support from SMC and would fund various programs including the grassroots program initiated by German Bernhard Zgoll. His support ended when he handed SMC over to Eduardo Cojuangco Jr. due to his detoriating health.

== Death ==
Soriano died on March 18, 1984, at his residence in Madrid, Spain. He was 58 years old.
