= Bernhard Zgoll =

German football manager (1927–2002)

Personal information
- Full name: Bernard Jan Zgol
- Date of birth: 25 June 1927
- Place of birth: Chorzów, Poland

Managerial career
- Years: Team
- 1948–1950: Szombierki Bytom
- Pogoń Nowy Bytom
- Ruch Radzionków
- 1953–?: Szkółka ZS Górnik (youth)
- 1955–1958: Górnik Radlin
- 1984: Kenya
- Philippines
- 1992: Dominican Republic

Bernhard Zgoll (25 June 1927 as Bernard Jan Zgol– August 2002) was a Polish–German professional football manager. He is the second youngest trainer in the history of Ekstraklasa (21 years old in 1949).

== Career ==
Zgol coached two top Polish league teams: Szombierki Bytom and Górnik Radlin. In 1950, 1955, and 1957 he fell with his team to the second division, in 1956 he was promoted to the first division. In 1958, a Polish military court sentenced him to 10 years in prison for collaborating with American intelligence.

Zgol in 1970 arrived for Germany and changed the spelling of his surname. Next in 1978 in the Philippines to oversee the setting up of eight football centres in sites nationwide. These centres would be where young football hopefuls under the age of 18 could be nurtured and developed until they rose from the ranks and played for the national team.

In 1983, he served as a technical advisor in Korea Football Association

In 1984, he was a head coach of the Kenya national team. In 1992, he coached the Dominican Republic national team.

He was friends with Rudi Gutendorf.
