= Jaime Augusto Zobel de Ayala =

Filipino businessman (born 1959)

Jaime Augusto M. Zóbel II GCLH
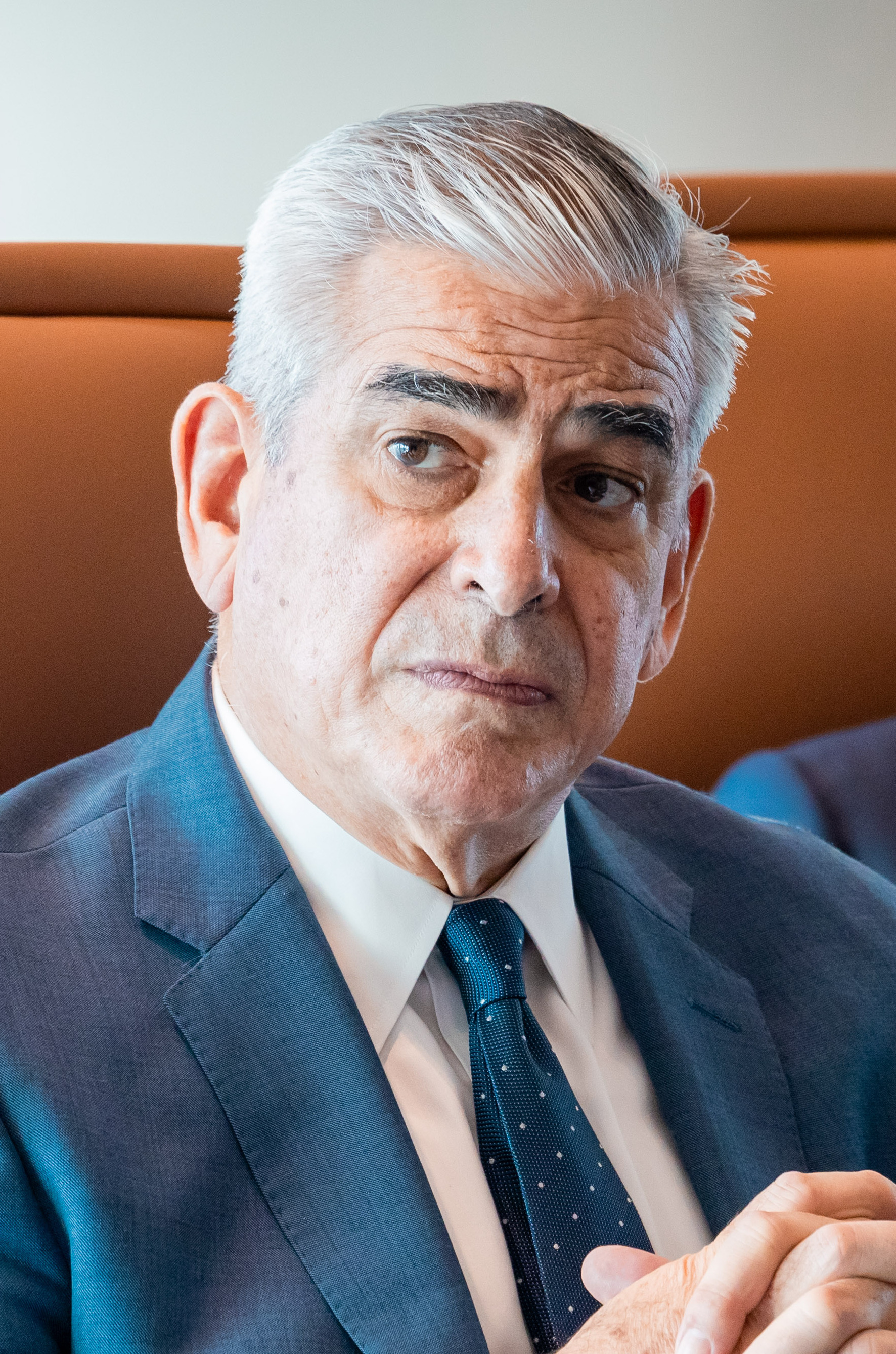
- Zobel in 2024
- Born: March 6, 1959 (age 67); Manila, Philippines
- Education: Harvard University (BA, MBA)
- Title: Chairman of Ayala Corporation
- Spouse: Elizabeth Eder-Zóbel de Ayala
- Children: 4 including Mariana & Jaime Alfonso
- Parent(s): Jaime P. Zóbel de Ayala I (father); Beatriz Barcon Miranda-Zobel de Ayala (mother)
- Relatives: Zóbel de Ayala family

Jaime Augusto Miranda Zóbel de Ayala II GCLH (born March 6, 1959), also known as Jaime Augusto Zóbel, is a Filipino businessman from the prominent Zóbel de Ayala family. He currently serves as the chairman of Ayala Corporation since 2016. He succeeded his father, Jaime Zóbel de Ayala, as the company's president and CEO in 1994. He was the company's chairman and CEO from 2006 to 2021.

In addition to his position in the Ayala Corporation, Zobel is chairman of Bank of the Philippine Islands, Ayala Land, AC Energy and Infrastructure Corporation (formerly AC Energy Inc.), Ayala Healthcare Holdings, Inc. and Asiacom Philippines Inc.

== Personal life and education ==
Zobel studied at the Ateneo de Manila University (1966–1968), Ladycross School (1968–1971), and Worth School (1972–1976) before earning a B.A. degree in economics (cum laude) from Harvard College in 1981, and an MBA from Harvard Business School in 1987. He is married to Elizabeth (Lizzie) Eder, a descendant of James Martin Eder. The couple have four children and two grandchildren.

== Career ==
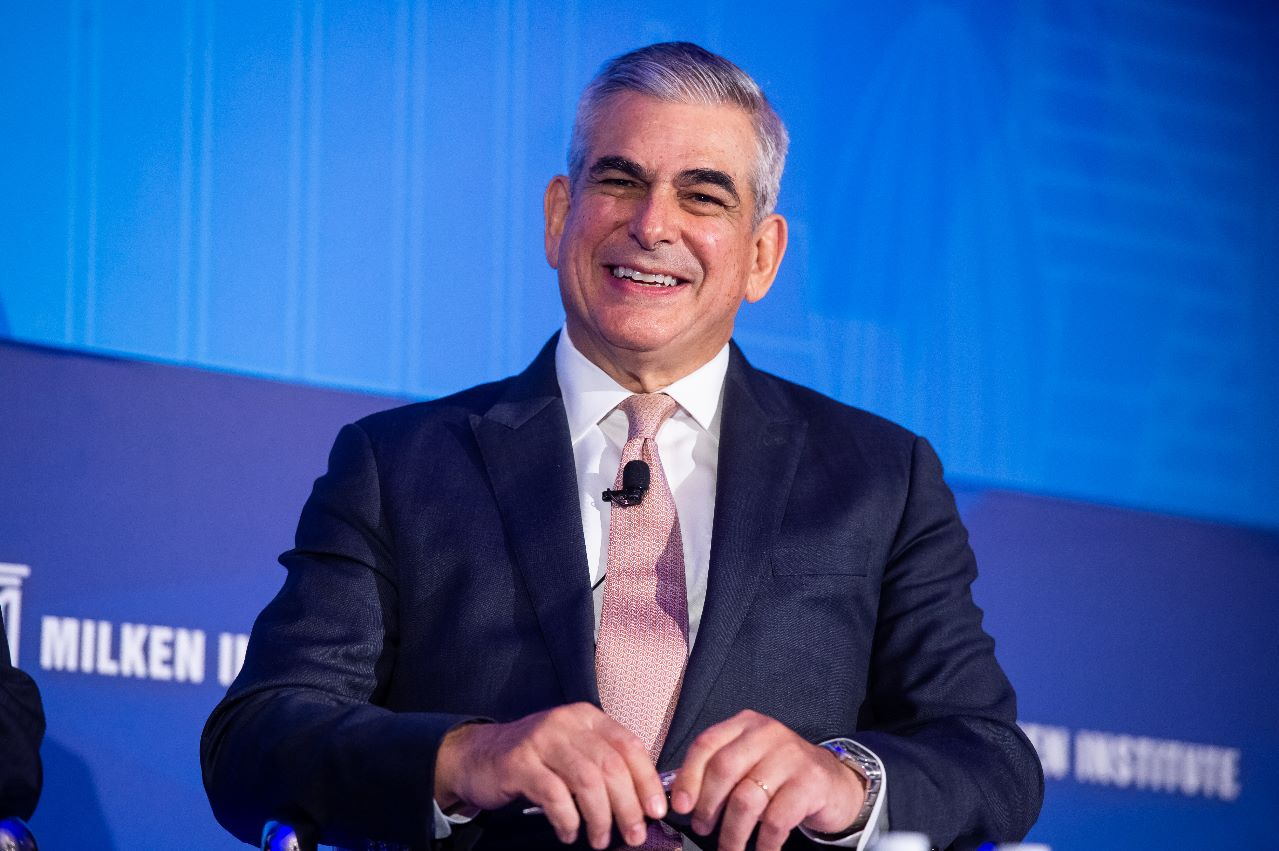
Zobel in 2018

He sits on the boards of various international and local business and socio-civic organizations, namely:

- Chairman, Bank of the Philippine Island
- Chairman, AC Energy and Infrastructure Corporation (formerly AC Energy Inc.)
- Chairman, Ayala Health Holdings
- Chairman, Asiacom Philippines
- Director, AC Ventures Holding Corp
- Director, AG Holdings Ltd.
- Director, Temasek Holdings (Private) Limited
- Co-Vice Chairman, Makati Business Club
- Member, Asia Business Council
- Member, Asean Business Club Advisory Council
- Member, Harvard Business School Board of Dean's Advisors
- Member, Harvard Business School Asia Advisory Committee
- Member, Harvard University Global Advisory Council
- Member, Harvard University, Asia Center Advisory Committee
- Member, JP Morgan International Council
- Member, JP Morgan Asia Pacific Council
- Member, Mitsubishi Corporation International Advisory Committee
- Member, Board of Governors – Asian Institute of Management
- Member, Endeavor Philippines
- Trustee, Singapore Management University (SMU)
- Trustee Emeritus, Eisenhower Fellowships
- Chairman, SMU International Advisory Council in the Philippines
- Member, Asia Global Institute (University of Hong Kong) Advisory Board
- Member, Council for Inclusive Capitalism with the Vatican
- Member, Leapfrog investment Global Leadership Council
- Member, World Wildlife Philippine National Advisory Council

== Honors and awards ==
Honors include World Economic Forum Global Leader for Tomorrow in 1995; Emerging Markets CEO of the year in 1998 (sponsored by ING); Philippine TOYM (Ten Outstanding Young Men) Award in 1999; and Management Association of the Philippines Management Man of the Year Award in 2006.

On September 27, 2007, he was conferred Harvard Business School’s highest honor, the Alumni Achievement Award, by Dean Jay O. Light. Zobel de Ayala was cited for “his innovative, entrepreneurial style of management (that) has benefited both Ayala and an island nation that faces significant social and economic challenges.” He is the first Filipino to receive this award.

Zóbel was then conferred the Presidential Medal of Merit in 2009 and the Philippine Legion of Honor, Rank of Grand Commander in 2010. He was also conferred the Gawad Mabini with the rank of Commander in 2015.

Later on, Finance Asia named him Best CEO for 2009/2010 and he received the CNBC Asia Business Leader Award in 2010.

On November 25, 2010, Zobel received the Asia Talent Management Award at the 9th CNBC Asia Business Leaders Awards held in Singapore. Zobel was recognized for “his personal involvement in supporting and nurturing leadership within the company.” Zobel was quoted as saying that he and his brother Fernando Zobel de Ayala, currently Special Advisor to the Ayala Corporation Board of Directors, consider succession planning as a critical element in ensuring the corporation's sustainability. He was the third Filipino to be recognized by the annual program, following Globe Telecom CEO Gerardo Ablaza Jr. who received the ABLA in 2004, and Jollibee CEO Tony Tan Caktiong for corporate citizenship in 2006.”

On September 14, 2017, Zobel was named by the United Nations Global Compact as one of the 10 Sustainable Development Goals (SDG) Pioneers for the year 2017. He was the first Filipino and Southeast Asian to be recognized with this honor. Since 2016, the UN Global Compact has identified individuals "who were showcasing how business can be a force for good" and recognized them "for their efforts and achievements in advancing the SDGs."

== See also ==
- Zobel de Ayala family
