= Zóbel de Ayala family =

Filipino business family

Zóbel de Ayala
- Business
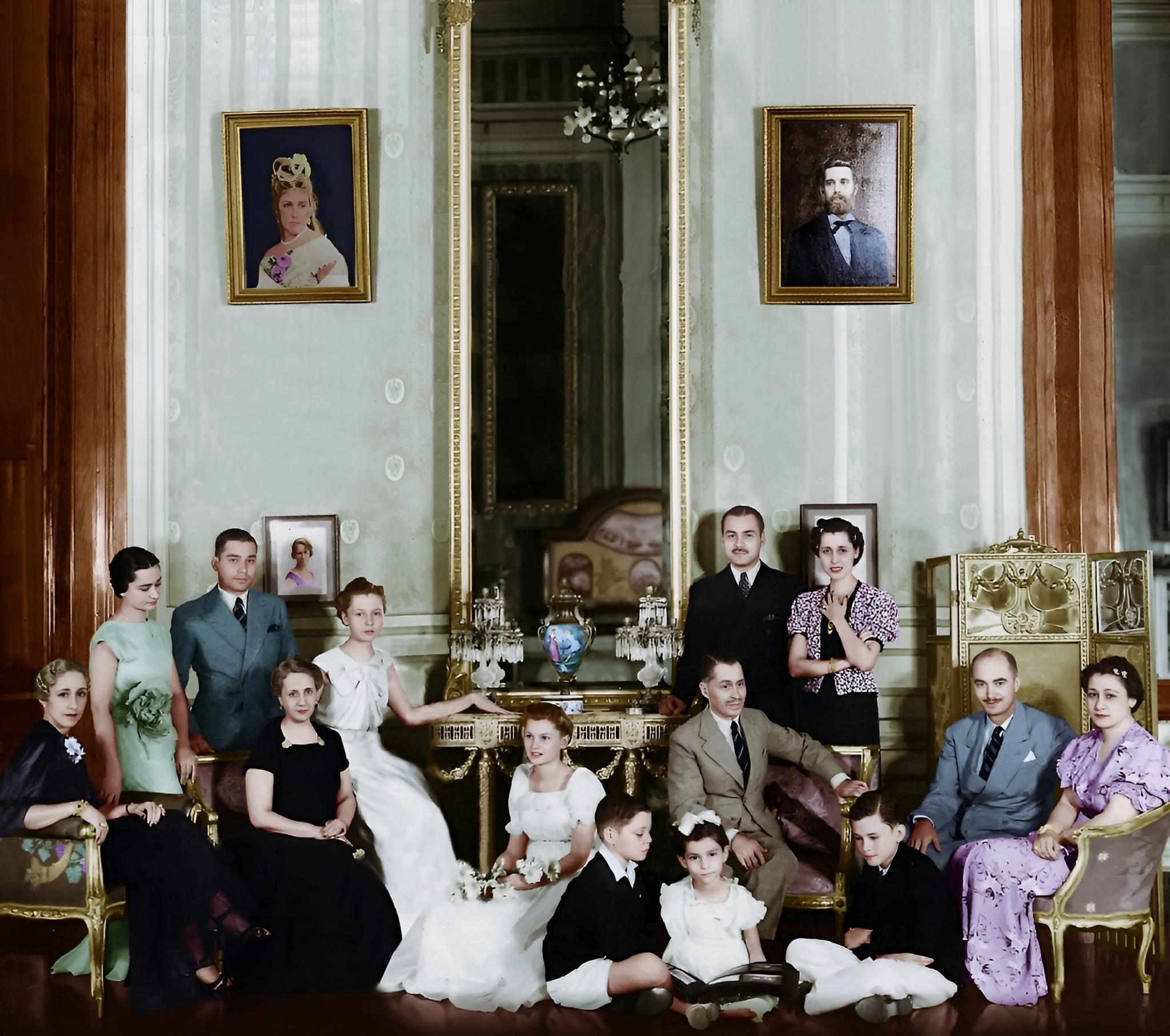
- Current region: Makati, Metro Manila, Philippines
- Founded: 1876; 150 years ago
- Founder: Jacobo Zangroniz Zóbel (1842–1896); Trinidad Roxas de Ayala-Zobel (1856–1918)
- Connected families: Róxas de Ayala

The Zóbel de Ayala family is a prominent Filipino family of Spanish and German descent who were the founders of Ayala y Compañía (now Ayala Corporation) and patrons of the Premio Zóbel literary awards. The clan is directly descended from Jácobo Zangroniz Zóbel (1842–1896) and Trinidad Roxas de Ayala (1856–1918). Ayala y Compañía (established in 1876) traces its origins to Casa Róxas, a business partnership established in 1834 between Domingo Ureta Roxas (1792–1843) and Antonio de Ayala (1803–1876).

== History ==
=== Jacobo Zóbel y Zangroniz (1842–1896) ===
Jácobo Zóbel y Zangroniz was the son of Jakob Zobel and Ana Maria Zangróniz (daughter of a justice at the Real Audiencia of Manila, who had come from an old Navarrese/Basque family.) He was born on the 12 October 1842, and was the first Zóbel born in the Philippines. His grandfather, Johannes Andreas Zobel, arrived in the Philippines from Hamburg, Germany in 1832, together with his wife, Cornelia Hirsch, and their son, Jakob Zobel. Johannes Andreas Zobel came from a long line of German pharmacists and established the Botica Zóbel, an apothecary, in 1834, located on Calle Real 28 in Intramuros.

Zóbel was sent to his parents' hometown Hamburg, Germany for his primary education (1848 to 1859) and continued his higher studies at the Universidad Central de Madrid, taking up natural sciences. It was there he explored his lifelong fascination with medicine, chemistry and archaeology. In doing so, he mastered eleven languages. He befriended the young numismatist Antonio Delgado (1805-1879) from Madrid, who inspired his scholarship on antiquarian coins. He traveled to several museums in Europe to research more about his collecting hobby and he published the classic monograph titled "Memoria Sobre Las Monedas Libiofenicias o Teudetanas" which is still published and used in Spanish universities to this day. He graduated from the university in 1864 and returned to Spanish Manila to assume management of Botica Zóbel.

Brought up as a liberal, Zóbel welcomed his appointment by Governor & Captain-General Carlos de la Torre as a member of the Manila Municipal Board and the Sociedad Económica de los Amigos del País. During his term, Zóbel introduced many liberal reforms: public schools, the first tree-planting activities and campaigned for representation in the Spanish Cortes. He also opened the first public reading room and library during his term.

Because of his many liberal ideas, Zóbel became a suspect following the Cavite Mutiny of 1872. On September 22, 1874, he was imprisoned in Fort Santiago for several months on the charge of sedition. He was cited also for possession of firearms and revolutionary pamphlets. The Prince of Bismarck made representations to the Spanish government to have him released. He was acquitted in February 1875 by the Real Audiencia of Manila for lack of evidence.

Zóbel married Trinidad Ayala y Roxas (1856–1918) on February 5, 1875. The couple took a whirlwind honeymoon trip to Japan, San Francisco, the World's Fair of 1876, and Europe, where their children were born. The couple decided to live briefly in Spain after Jacobo decided to study transportation systems in Europe, and he renewed his numismatic research, publishing a major work entitled Estudio Histórico de la Moneda Antigua Española Desde Su Origen Hasta El Imperio Romano in 1878.

Sometime in 1880, the couple returned to Manila. He became a representative of Eiffel et Cie. of Paris and built the Ayala Bridge in Manila.

Ayala y Compañia (the successor-in-interest to Casa Róxas) was established in 1876 and Zóbel became one of its partners until 1891.

He was appointed member of the Consejo de Administración by the King of Spain on May 25, 1882. He was also member of the Sociedad Económica de los Amigos del País, a conciliario (adviser) of Banco Español-Filipino and the secretary of the Cámara de Comercio de Manila. He became a member of the prestigious Real Academia de la Historia from 1865 to 1896. He received numerous awards, including the Grand Cross - Real Orden Americana de Isabel la Catolica in 1880, Knight - Orden de Carlos III, and knight-commander of the Order of the Northern Star of Sweden-Norway.

In December 1885, Zóbel established the first tram system in Manila, the Manila-Tondo line, which extended to Malabon and was powered by steam. His capitalist partner was the Spanish banker Adolfo Bayo and his local partner was one of the richest Filipinos of the time, Don Gonzalo Tuasón, of the naturalised Chinese mestizo caste. Eventually, he built four other major tram lines in Manila and its vicinity (Malate, Sampaloc to Tondo), drawn by horses.

Zóbel died on the 7 October 1896, while under suspicion once again of supporting the Philippine revolution.

=== Trinidad de Ayala y Róxas (1856–1918) ===
Trinidad de Ayala y Róxas was the youngest daughter of Antonio de Ayala and Margarita Róxas de Ayala (the eldest child of Domingo Róxas y Ureta). She was very supportive of her husband's liberal causes, a trait she inherited from her mother. She was very much interested in the arts and she cultivated singing. La Ilustración Filipina magazine reported on March 28, 1892, that she was invited to sing in Malacañang with other sopranos of the period.

In 1898, upon the death of her husband and with her brother-in-law, Pedro Pablo Róxas (1847–1913), away in Paris, France, Ayala divested her husband's tramcar and pharmacy businesses, and various assets of Ayala y Compañia. Showing extreme astuteness, she redeployed capital into marketable securities in hotels and trade, which later boomed after the Philippine–American War and World War I. She increased the family's holdings in Banco Español Filipino, bought into The Hong Kong & Shanghai Banking Company Ltd. and invested in Hong Kong real estate. Under her stewardship, Banco Español Filipino expanded into branch banking, opening an office in Iloilo City. She funded the development of Manila's first community water system, known as the Carriedo waterworks.

In 1898, she led Ayala y Compañía into its first real estate development. Upon the death of her brother-in-law Pedro Pablo Róxas in 1912, she took over his interests in Ayala y Compañia. In 1914, she gave Hacienda San Pedro de Macati to her grandchildren – Jacobo, Alfonso and Mercedes (the children of her son Enrique P. Zóbel de Ayala with his first wife, Consuelo Roxas). She died in 1918 at the age of 62.

== Descendants ==
Jacobo Zangroniz Zobel and Trinidad Roxas de Ayala-Zobel had five children – Fernando Antonio Zóbel de Ayala (1876–1949); twins Enrique P. Zóbel de Ayala (1877–1943) and Alfonso Zóbel de Ayala (1877–1882); Margarita Zóbel de Ayala (1881–1963); and Gloria Zóbel de Ayala – who were the first-generation Zobel de Ayalas. Among the children, Fernando Antonio Zóbel de Ayala and Enrique P. Zóbel de Ayala would assume leadership of Ayala y Compañía. Enrique's descendants would inherit Ayala y Compañía after his death in 1943. After the end of World War II, the family's fortunes would increase with the development of Hacienda San Pedro de Macati.

On December 31, 1967, Ayala y Compañía shifted from a partnership to a corporation, becoming Ayala Corporation.

== Bloodline ==
- Domingo Róxas y Ureta (1792-1843) m. Maria Saturnina Ubaldo
  - Margarita Róxas y Ubaldo (1826-1869) m. Antonio de Ayala (1803-1876)
    - Camila Ayala y Róxas m. Andres de Zarate y Ortiz
    - Carmen Ayala y Róxas (d. 1930) m. Pedro Pablo (Perico) Róxas (1847-1912)
      - Consuelo Roxas y Ayala (1877-1907) m. Enrique P. Zóbel de Ayala (1877-1943)
      - José Róxas y Ayala
      - Margarita Róxas y Ayala m. Eduardo Sanz Soriano
      - Pedro Róxas y Ayala
      - Antonio Róxas y Ayala
    - Trinidad Ayala y Róxas (1856-1918) m. Jacobo Zóbel y Zangroniz (1842-1896) (see Family Tree)
      - Fernando Antonio Zóbel de Ayala (1876-1949)
      - Enrique P. Zóbel de Ayala (1877-1943) m. Consuelo Róxas (1877-1907); m. Fermina Montojo (1881-1966)
      - Alfonso Zóbel de Ayala (1877-1882) (twin of Enrique P. Zóbel de Ayala)
      - Margarita Zóbel de Ayala m. Antonio Melian y Pavia (1879-1956)
      - Gloria Zóbel de Ayala
  - José Bonifacio Róxas (1834-1888) m. Juana de Castro
    - Pedro Pablo (Perico) Róxas (1847-1912) m. Carmen Ayala y Róxas (d. 1930)
  - Mariano Roxas

=== Family tree ===
- Jacobo Zóbel y Zangroniz (1842-1896) m. Trinidad Ayala y Róxas (1856-1918)
  - Fernando Antonio Zóbel de Ayala (1876-1949) m. Concepción Palet y Tremoya
  - Enrique P. Zóbel de Ayala (1877-1943) m. Consuelo Róxas y Ayala (1877-1907); m. Fermina Montojo y Torronntegui (1881-1966)
    - Jacobo Zóbel de Ayala y Róxas (1902-1971) m. Angela Olgado; m. Sachiko Morita
      - Enrique J. Zóbel (1927-2004) m. Rocío Urquijo (1935-2009); m. Dee Anne Hora
        - Jacobo Santiago (Santi) U. Zóbel (1954-1965)
        - Mercedes (Dedes) U. Zóbel m. Carlo Pessina
          - Ava Z. Pessina
        - Iñigo U. Zóbel m. María Cristina Cardenas
          - Bianca Zobel m. Christopher Warns
          - Paola C. Zobel m. Santiago Laborde
          - Iñigo C. Zobel
          - Natalia C. Zobel m. Eduardo Aboitiz
          - Rocio Mercedes C. Zobel
    - Alfonso Zóbel de Ayala y Róxas (1903-1967) m. Carmen Pfitz (1909-1999)
      - María Victoria (Vicky) Zóbel de Ayala m. Juan Antonio Vallejo-Nágera (1926-1990)
        - Alejandra Z. Vallejo-Nágera
        - Iñigo Z. Vallejo-Nágera
        - María Z. Vallejo-Nágera
      - Jaime Zóbel de Ayala (1934-) m. Beatriz Miranda (1936-2024)
        - Jaime Augusto Zóbel de Ayala II (1959-) m. Elizabeth Eder
          - Mariana Beatriz Zóbel de Ayala (1989-) m. Danel Aboitiz
          - Jaime Alfonso Zóbel de Ayala (1990-) m. Margarita Aboitiz
          - Eugenia Zóbel de Ayala
          - Mercedes Zóbel de Ayala
        - Fernando Zóbel de Ayala (1960-) m. Catherine Marie Silverio
          - Natasha Consuelo Zobel de Ayala m. Jamie Knox
          - Sylvia Zobel de Ayala
          - Katya Zobel de Ayala
          - Fernando Alvaro Zobel de Ayala
        - Beatriz Susana (Bea Jr.) Zóbel m. Juan Urquijo Fernández de Araoz (d. 1995)
          - Jaime Z. Urquijo m. Alexandra Suarez
          - Paloma Z. Urquijo m. Juan Miguel Cortez Hernandez
          - Monica Z. Urquijo
        - Patricia Zóbel m. Juan Enrique de Herrera García Moriyón (?); m. Alonso Halffter Caro
          - Eduardo Zobel
        - Cristina Zóbel m. Ignacio Suárez de Puga Fontes
        - Monica Zóbel m. Guillermo Pla Otáñez
        - Sofia Zóbel m. Francisco R. Elizalde, Jr.
          - Cristina Z. Elizalde
          - Bea Z. Elizalde
          - Patxi Elizalde
      - Alfonso (Alfonsito) Zóbel de Ayala, Jr.(d. 2023)
    - Mercedes Zóbel de Ayala y Róxas (1907-2005) m. Joseph McMicking (1908-1990)
    - Matilde Zóbel de Ayala y Montojo m. Luis Albarracin Segura
    - Consuelo Zóbel de Ayala y Montojo (1914-1990) m. James D. Alger (1912-1986)
    - Gloria Zóbel de Ayala y Montojo m. Ricardo Padilla y Satrustegui
      - Georgina Z. Padilla m. Luis Mac-Crohon y Garay
      - Alejandro Z. Padilla
    - Fernando M. Zóbel (1924-1984)
  - Alfonso Zóbel de Ayala (1877-1882) (twin of Enrique)
  - Margarita Zóbel de Ayala m. Antonio Melián y Pavía, 4th Count of Peracamps (1879-1923-1957)
    - Sylvia Z. Melián
    - Leopoldo Melián, 5th Count of Peracamps (1910-1978) m. María Natividad Ugarte y Aboitiz (1916-2018)
      - Margarita Melián (1948) m. 1975 Ignacio Ricardo Ortigas
      - Enrique Melián, 6th Count of Peracamps (1955)
    - Eduardo Z. Melián
    - Raul Z. Melián
    - Elena Z. Melián (1915-1925)
    - Alfredo Z. Melián (1916-1991) m. Almudt Schmidt (1921-1946) m. Mary Dolores Randolph Magda (1926-2016)
      - Cristobal S. Melián (1946) m. Marianne Heiberg (1945-2004)
      - Arturo R. Melián (1957)
      - Victoria R. Melián (1958-2021) m. Luis Marsans Astoreca (1952-2004)
      - Eugenia R. Melián (1960)
      - Sylvia R. Melián (1962)
  - Gloria Zóbel de Ayala

== Ayala Corporation ==
The Zóbel de Ayalas are among several Filipino families listed in Forbes list of the world's richest people. The family owns the majority of and controls Ayala Corporation, the country's largest and oldest conglomerate that includes the Bank of the Philippine Islands, Ayala Land Inc., Manila Water Company until its divestment in 2024, and Globe Telecom, one of the largest mobile phone networks in the Philippines. Its former legal name was Ayala y Compañia (sometimes shortened to Ayala y Cía) (established in 1876) which evolved from a series of partnerships beginning with Casa Róxas, a partnership established in 1834 between Domingo Róxas and Antonio de Ayala. In 1968, Ayala y Compañia shifted from a partnership to a corporation, becoming Ayala Corporation. The family continues to hold the controlling stake in the company through its privately-held holding company Mermac, Inc., the etymology of which comes from Mercedes & her husband MacMicking.

== San Miguel Corporation ==
Iñigo U. Zóbel is the majority shareholder and chairman of Top Frontier Investment Holdings, Inc., the largest and controlling shareholder of San Miguel Corporation.

== Public service ==
- In 1929, Enrique P. Zóbel de Ayala established the Premio Zóbel to recognize the best written works in the Spanish language in the Philippines.
- The Ayala Foundation (formerly, Filipinas Foundation) envisions communities where people are productive, creative, self-reliant, and proud to be Filipino.
- The Consuelo Foundation was established by Consuelo Zóbel Alger. It operates and supports programs in Hawaii and the Philippines that prevent and treat abuse, neglect and the exploitation of children, women and families.

== Legacy and honors ==
The De La Salle-Santiago Zóbel School was named after Jacobo Santiago "Santi" Zóbel (1954–1965), the eldest son of Enrique J. Zóbel and Rocío Urquijo.

"Jaime Zóbel de Ayala and family" are among the three Filipino families included in the Forbes list of the "World's Richest Families".

The 2007 Harvard Alumni Achievement Award was awarded to Jaime Augusto Zóbel de Ayala, chairman of Ayala Corporation, for his exemplary leadership in business. It is the highest honor of the Harvard Business School. He was the first Filipino and the youngest alumnus to be so honored.

Jaime Zóbel de Ayala was awarded with the Philippine Legion of Honor, Rank of Grand Commander on December 24, 2009. Jaime Augusto Zóbel de Ayala II and Fernando Zóbel de Ayala were awarded with the Philippine Legion of Honor, Rank of Grand Commander on June 29, 2010.

== Notable members ==
- Enrique P. Zóbel de Ayala
- Iñigo U. Zóbel
- Fernando M. Zóbel
- Col. Jacobo Zóbel
- Col. Joseph Rafael McMicking
- Mercedes Roxas Zóbel-McMicking
- Consuelo Zóbel Alger
- Enrique J. Zóbel
- Jaime P. Zóbel, I
- Jaime Augusto M. Zóbel de Ayala II
- Fernando M. Zóbel de Ayala
