= Fernando Zobel de Ayala =

Filipino businessman

Fernando M. Zóbel de Ayala GCLH
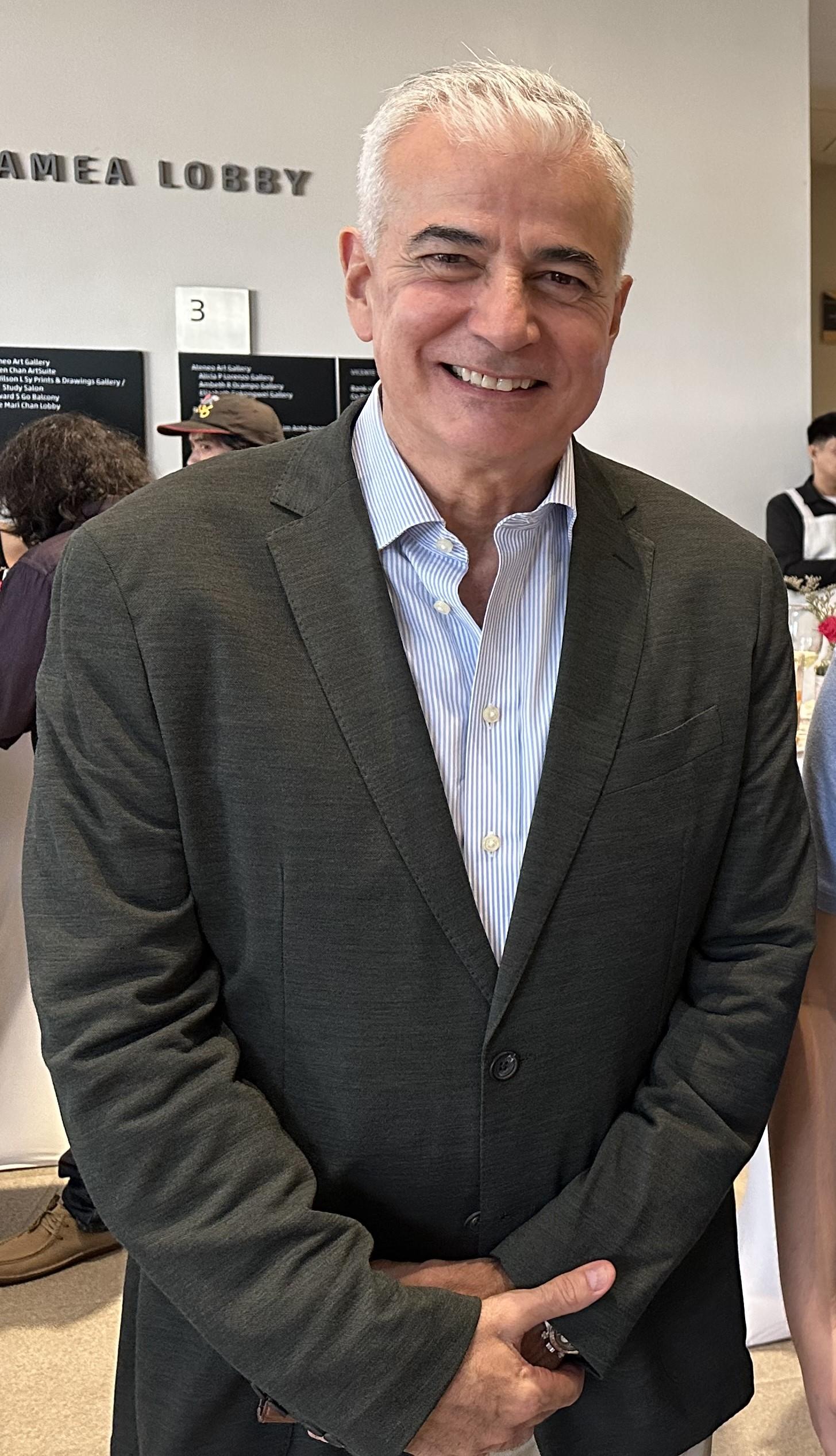
- Zobel in 2024
- Born: March 14, 1960 (age 66); Ermita, Manila, Philippines
- Education: Ladycross School; Harvard College; INSEAD
- Title: President and CEO of Ayala Corporation
- Spouse: Catherine Silverio
- Children: 4
- Parent: Jaime P. Zóbel de Ayala, I (father)
- Relatives: Zóbel de Ayala family

Fernando Miranda Zóbel de Ayala GCLH (born March 14, 1960) is a Filipino businessman. He served as president (2006–2022) and chief executive officer (2021–2022) of Ayala Corporation.

== Education ==
Zóbel attended Ladycross School for his preparatory studies and graduated from Harvard College with a Bachelor of Arts degree in 1982. He also completed a Certificate in International Management at INSEAD in France.

== Career ==
Zóbel served as chairman of Ayala Land, Inc., Manila Water Company, Inc., AC International Finance Ltd., Ayala International Pte Ltd., Ayala DBS Holdings, Inc., Alabang Commercial Corporation, AC Energy Holdings, Inc., and Hero Foundation, Inc; co-chairman of the Ayala Foundation, Inc.; co-vice chairman of Mermac, Inc.; director of the Bank of the Philippine Islands, Globe Telecom, Integrated Micro-Electronics, Inc. (IMI), LiveIt Investments, Ltd., Asiacom Philippines, Inc., AG Holdings Limited, Ayala International Holdings Limited, AI North America, Inc., Vesta Property Holdings Inc., Honda Cars Philippines, Inc., Isuzu Philippines Corporation, Pilipinas Shell Petroleum Corp., and Manila Peninsula.

== Other activities ==
He sits on the boards of various international and local business and socio-civic organizations:

=== International ===
- Chairman, Habitat for Humanity Asia-Pacific Capital Campaign Steering Committee
- Vice Chairman, Habitat for Humanity International
- Member, The Asia Society
- Member, World Economic Forum
- Member, INSEAD East Asia Council
- Member, World Presidents' Organization

=== Local ===
- Chairman, HERO Foundation, Inc.
- Trustee, Caritas Manila
- Trustee, Pilipinas Shell Foundation
- Trustee, Kapit Bisig para sa Ilog Pasig Advisory Board
- Trustee, National Museum of the Philippines

== Personal life ==
Zóbel is married to Catherine Silverio, daughter of former PBA coach Dante Silverio. They have four children.

== Honors ==
- Philippine Legion of Honor, Rank of Grand Commander (June 29, 2010).
