= Jaime Zobel de Ayala =

Filipino businessman (born 1934)

Jaime P. Zóbel de Ayala GCLH

Ambassador of the Republic of the Philippines to the United Kingdom
- In office 1970–1975
- President: Ferdinand Marcos
- Preceded by: Narciso G. Reyes
- Succeeded by: Jose Manuel E. Stilianopoulos

Personal details
- Born: July 18, 1934 (age 92) Manila, Philippine Islands
- Spouse: Beatriz Barcon Miranda (died 2024)
- Children: 7, including Jaime Augusto II and Fernando
- Education: Harvard University
- Website: jaimezobel.com

Jaime Pfitz Zóbel de Ayala GCLH (born July 18, 1934), also known as Jaime Zóbel, is a Filipino businessman who was the chairman of the Ayala Corporation from 1984 to 2006, and its president from 1984 to 1994. Presently, he holds the honorary title of "chairman emeritus".

Zóbel served as the Ambassador of the Republic of the Philippines to the United Kingdom from 1970 to 1975. He is also an art photographer and the first Filipino photographer to be given a Licentiate by the Royal Photographic Society of the United Kingdom.

Zóbel and his wife Beatriz Barcon Miranda are parents to the current Ayala clan branch that are directors of Ayala Corporation.

== Early life and family ==
Jaime Zóbel was born on July 18, 1934 to Alfonso Róxas Zóbel de Ayala (1904–1967) and Carmen Herrera Pfitz (1909–1999). His siblings are María Victoria ("Vicky") and Alfonso Jr. ("Alfonsito"). He is a grandson of Enrique P. Zóbel de Ayala and Consuelo Róxas de Ayala.

He is the widower of Beatriz Barcon Miranda. Together they have two sons (Jaime Augusto II and Fernando), and five daughters (Beatriz Susana ["Bea Jr."], Patricia, Cristina, Monica, and Sofía).

== Education ==
After early education in the Philippines, Zóbel attended Harvard University, where he graduated in 1957 with a bachelor's degree in architectural sciences. He attended the six-week Advanced Management Program in the Far East, conducted by faculty from the Harvard Graduate School of Business Administration in Baguio, the Philippines in 1963.

== Career ==
=== Ayala Corporation ===
For a Filipino institution to stick to a "business-as-usual" slogan during extraordinary times was neither possible nor honorable. This was true during the Filipinos' struggle for independence from Spain. This was true during the Japanese occupation[....] While my own feeling, both as person and as a professional, had been mounting before the event, my final moment of awareness came when, in those dreaded August days of 1983, I stood before the coffin of Ninoy Aquino and saw his battered face.

— Jaime Zóbel de Ayala, giving a speech before the Makati Chamber of Commerce and Industry in March 1987

Zóbel joined Ayala y Compañía in 1958 as executive assistant upon the invitation of his father and placed him under the wing of his cousin Enrique and uncle Col. Joseph McMicking. As an executive assistant in the company, he took down notes during management meetings and gradually learned the ropes of the family business. He was later transferred to the training section of the insurance companies of the Ayala group. In 1975, he became president of Filipinas Life Assurance Company (now, BPI AIA Life Assurance Corporation).

In 1984, he succeeded Enrique, as chairman and president of Ayala Corporation (AC). Zóbel successfully steered Ayala through the tense, final years of the Marcos dictatorship. The assassination of Ninoy Aquino in 1983 was later cited by Zóbel to have pushed him and his wife Bea into active participation in the opposition movement against President Ferdinand Marcos, with Zóbel stating that "Ayala has always been apolitical but this was a time that you knew that you had to be political, there was no other way."

In the lead-up to the February 1986 presidential election, the Ayala couple were among the most fervent supporters of presidential candidate Corazon Aquino, widow of Ninoy Aquino. Two weeks after the election, the People Power Revolution against President Marcos occurred, wherein the Ayalas were active participants, and upon the overthrow of the Marcos family and the installation of Corazon Aquino's new administration, Bea "helped put things in order" at the Malacañang Palace. Jaime Zóbel's photographs of people at the revolution were later compiled into a book entitled Filipino, published in March 1987 by Kyodo Press.

Zóbel stepped down as president of Ayala Corporation in 1994 and was succeeded by his son, Jaime Augusto. He continued as chairman until his retirement in 2006 and then became its chairman emeritus.

=== Photography ===
Zóbel joined the Camera Club of the Philippines in the mid-1970s and began taking photography more seriously. He is the first Filipino amateur photographer to be confirmed “Licentiate” by the Royal Photographic Society of the United Kingdom, and has received similar commendations from the French and Spanish governments for his contributions to art and culture. He exhibits regularly in the Philippines and abroad, and has produced several critically acclaimed books. He continues to break new ground in art photography with explorations in various art media.

=== Diplomat ===
Between 1970 and 1975, Zóbel was appointed as the Philippine Ambassador to the Court of St. James's in London, representing the United Kingdom and ambassador of Scandinavian countries.

== Honors and awards ==
- 1968, Comendador al Mérito Civil, Spain
- 1980, Chevalier de l’Ordre des Arts et des Lettres, France
- 1985, Doctor of Business Management (honoris causa) De La Salle University, Manila
- 1986, Senator Award, highest honor bestowed by the JCI Philippines
- 1987, “Management Man of the Year”, Management Association of the Philippines
- 1991, Doctor of Laws (honoris causa), University of the Philippines Diliman
- 2004, FIRST Responsible Capitalism Award Winner
- 2008, Hero of Philanthropy, Forbes magazine, special issue Asia magazine initiated this recognition, including four Filipinos: Jaime Zobel de Ayala, John Gokongwei, Ramon del Rosario Jr., and Oscar Lopez. The list recognizes four philanthropists from each of 13 selected countries and territories in Asia
- 2009, Philippine Legion of Honor, Rank of Grand Commander, Armed Forces of the Philippines
- 2018, Order of the Rising Sun, Second Class, Gold and Silver Star, Japan

== Notability ==
- In 2007, Zóbel was ranked as tied with Henry Sy as the richest person in the Philippines, with a net worth of $2.6 billion, according to Forbes magazine.
- In 2008, Zóbel and his family were ranked 3rd in Forbes magazine's 2008 list of 40 wealthiest Filipinos, due to a 46% drop in their conglomerate Ayala Corp. shares, which were worth $800 million.

== See also ==
- Zóbel de Ayala family
