= Ayala Corporation =

Philippine diversified conglomerate

- Ayala Triangle Gardens Tower 2, site of the headquarters of Ayala Corporation
- Formerly: Ayala y Compañía
- Type: Public
- Traded as: PSE: AC
- Industry: Conglomerate
- Founded: Manila, Captaincy General of the Philippines; 1834; 192 years ago
- Founders: Domingo Ureta Roxas; Antonio de Ayala
- Headquarters: 37th to 39th Floors, Ayala Triangle Gardens Tower 2, Paseo de Roxas cor. Makati Avenue, Makati Central Business District, Makati City, Metro Manila, Philippines
- Area served: Philippines Global Presence: Americas: United States, Mexico, Cayman Islands, British Virgin Islands (4); Europe: United Kingdom, Germany, Czech Republic, France, Serbia, Bulgaria (6); Middle East: Israel, Saudi Arabia (2); Asia: India, China, Japan, Myanmar, Thailand, Vietnam, Hong Kong, Taiwan, Malaysia, Singapore, Indonesia (11); Oceania: Australia (1)
- Key people: Directors: Jaime Augusto Zóbel de Ayala (chairman); Cezar P. Consing (President and CEO); Maria Lourdes Heras-de Leon (Former president); Delfin Lazaro (Non-Executive Director); Keiichi Matsunaga (Non-Executive Director); Mercedita S. Nolledo (Non-Executive Director); Antonio Jose U. Periquet (Lead Independent Director); Rizalina G. Mantaring (Independent Director); Management Committee: Jaime Augusto Zóbel de Ayala (advisor); Cezar P. Consing (President and CEO); John Eric T. Francia (ACEN President and CEO); Ruel T. Maranan (Ayala Foundation President); Bernard Vincent O. Dy (Ayala Land President and CEO); Alfredo I. Ayala (iPeople COO); Arthur R. Tan (AC Industrial President and CEO); John Philip S. Orbeta (Chief Human Resources Officer); Jose Teodoro K. Limcaoco (BPI President and CEO); Solomon M. Hermosura (Chief Legal Officer); Jose Rene Gregory D. Almendras (AC Infrastructure President and CEO); Ernest Lawrence L. Cu (Globe President and CEO); Paolo Maximo F. Borromeo (AC Health President and CEO); Alberto M. de Larrazabal (Ayala Chief Finance, Risk, and Sustainability Officer); Francisco Romero Milan (Strategic Adviser for Human Resources)
- Revenue: ▲ ₱141.6 billion (2021)
- Net income: ▲ ₱48.3 billion (2025)
- Total assets: ▼ ₱1.349 trillion (2021)
- Total equity: ▲ ₱565.3 billion (2021)
- Owner: Mermac, Inc.(47.53%) (Zóbel de Ayala family's holding company); Public (45.24%); SM Group (3.73%)
- Number of employees: 60,150 (2021)
- Subsidiaries: List of subsidiaries: Ayala Land (46.3%); BPI (48.5%); Globe (30.8%); ACEN (64.7%); Emerging Businesses: AC Health, AC Logistics; Portfolio Investments: AC Industrials, AC Infra, AC Ventures, Manila Water, iPeople
- Website: ayala.com

Ayala Corporation (Spanish: Corporación Ayala, formerly Ayala y Compañía; lit. 'Ayala & Company') is a Philippine diversified conglomerate. Founded in 1834 by Domingo Ureta Roxas and Antonio de Ayala during Spanish colonial rule, it is the Philippines' oldest and largest conglomerate. The company has a portfolio of diverse business interests, including investments in retail, education, real estate, banking, telecommunications, water infrastructure, renewable energy, electronics, information technology, automotive, healthcare, management, and business process outsourcing.

As of 2024, it is ranked by Forbes Global 2000 as the 5th largest corporation in the Philippines, and the 7th largest according to Fortune Southeast Asia 500 in terms of annual revenue.

== History ==
=== Foundation and early years (1834–1945) ===
Established in 1876, Ayala y Compañía traces its origins to Casa Róxas, a partnership founded in 1834 by Domíngo Ureta Róxas and Antonio de Ayala. The enterprise began with Ayala Distillery (originally Destileria y Licoreria de Ayala y Compañía) the producer of Ginebra San Miguel. The distillery was later acquired by Carlos T. Palanca-owned La Tondeña, Inc. in 1929.

In 1888, the company introduced the first tramcar service in the Philippines. The company participated in the construction of the Ayala Bridge over the Pasig River in Manila. Originally built of wood in 1872, the bridge was reconstructed in steel in 1908 to become the first steel bridge in the Philippines.

=== Post-war development and incorporation ===
Under the leadership of Colonel Joseph Ralph McMicking - who was married to Mercedes Roxas Zobel-McMicking the company was also responsible for the urban development of Makati after World War II.

Ayala y Compañía shifted from a partnership to a corporation with the establishment of Ayala Corporation in 1968. It welcomed the minority investment of Mitsubishi Corporation as its strategic partner in 1973 -1974. The Ayala Corporation later became a public company in 1976.

=== 21st-century leadership and diversification ===
In January 2006, the board of directors publicly announced the decision by Jaime Zóbel de Ayala to retire as chairman of the corporation by April 2006, appointing him chairman emeritus upon his retirement. He formally stepped down during the annual stockholders' meeting on April 7, 2006, concluding a 49-year career with the company and a 22-year tenure as its chairman. His eldest son, Jaime Augusto Zóbel de Ayala, succeeded him as chairman and chief executive officer, while his younger son, Fernando Zóbel de Ayala, assumed the position of president and chief operating officer. The Zobel de Ayala family's holding company, Mermac, Inc., retained (and to this day continues to have) the controlling stake in Ayala Corporation.

In 2011, the Ayala Corporation began building its renewable energy portfolio, beginning with a joint venture with Mitsubishi for solar power and Sta. Clara Power for run-of-the-river hydro power, and the purchase of the iconic Northwind farm for wind power. Ayala will contribute 1000 MW to the Philippine power supply by 2015. FinanceAsia named Ayala Corporation as the best-managed company in the Philippines in 2010 and 2015, as well as Best for Corporate Governance and Best for Corporate Social Responsibility.

== Attached companies and investments ==
=== Real estate ===
- Alveo Land
- Ayala Land Inc.
  - AyalaLand Logistics Holdings Corp. (ALLHC)
  - Ayala Malls
  - Makati Development Corp. (MDC)
- AG Holdings, Ltd.
- Avida Land
- Amaia Land
- Bellavita
- Portico Land Corp. - joint venture with Mitsubishi Corporation
- Roxas Land Corp. - joint venture with Bank of the Philippine Islands and Hongkong Land
- Regent Wise Investments Limited
  - MCT Consortium Berhad (32.95% ownership, based in Malaysia)
- Ortigas & Company Limited Partnership - Since November 2014, Ayala and SM Prime Holdings ended their dispute over the ownership of OCLP Holdings, the parent of Ortigas & Company. Ayala has recently sealed a deal with a group led by Ignacio Ortigas for the development of the Ortigas family's land bank area.
- Trident Infrastructure and Development Corporation (TIDC) - Formerly known as "Team Trident" and "the super consortium", is a joint-venture between Aboitiz Equity Ventures, Inc. (AEV), Ayala Land Inc. (ALI), Megaworld Corporation (MEG) and SM Prime Holdings, Inc. (SMPH). It is aimed to develop the Laguna Lakeshore Expressway and Dike Project (LLEDP).
- Ayala-GT Capital - In May 2015, through Ayala's Alveo Land and GT Capital's Federal Land, the two corporations will develop a 45-hectare property in Biñan, Laguna, aimed towards mid-range and high-end markets.

=== Financial services ===
- Bank of the Philippine Islands (BPI)
- Globe Fintech Innovations Inc. (Mynt)
  - G-XChange, Inc. - Operates GCash, which serves over 94 million users
  - Fuse Lending, Inc. - Offers tech-based microloans and business lines credit without rigid banking documentation. (Powers the relevant functionality in the GCash app).

=== Telecommunications ===
- Globe Telecom

=== Utilities ===
- Manila Water Company Inc.

(only economic interests remain until 2029 - control handed over to Enrique K. Razon's Trident Water Holdings Company, Inc.)

=== Power and transport ===
- Ayala Corporation Energy Holdings, Ltd. - is the power unit of Ayala Corporation, with investments in the development of conventional as well as solar, wind, and mini-hydro energy sources.
- AC Infrastructure Holdings Corp. - pursues toll road, rail and airport projects under government's public-private partnership program.
  - Light Rail Manila Corporation—a consortium consisting of the Ayala Corporation, through its intermediate entity Light Rail Manila Holdings, Inc., Metro Pacific Investments Corporation, and Sumitomo Corporation for the Line 1 Common Station, Concession, and Bacoor Extension.
  - AF Payments, Inc. (10%) - another consortium between the Ayala Corporation and Metro Pacific Investments Corporation regarding the unified Automated Fare Collection System (Beep card) for Line 1-3, and eventually also for the PNR and other public transport.
  - North Avenue Grand Central station - the Unified Grand Central Station, is an interchange station currently in development by its stakeholders Metro Pacific Corporation, SMC-MRT7 of San Miguel Corporation, SM Prime Holdings, and Ayala Corporation.

=== Manufacturing and automotive ===
- AC Industrial Technology Holding, Inc.
  - Integrated Micro-Electronics, Inc. (IMI)
  - AC Mobility (previously AC Motors)
    - Bosch Car Service Philippines
    - Mobility Access Philippines Ventures, Inc. (MAPVI)
      - BYD Auto Philippines
    - ACMobility Premium Dealership Inc.
      - DENZA Philippines
  - Iconic Dealership, Inc.
  - Isuzu Philippines Corporation (owns 15%)
  - Kia Philippines, Inc
  - Adventure Cycle Philippines, Inc.
  - ACI Solar Holdings North America
    - Merlin Solar Technologies Inc.
  - AC Industrials Singapore
    - Misslbeck Technologies GmbH

=== Social infrastructure ===
- AC Health | Ayala Healthcare Holdings, Inc. (AC Health)
  - Healthway Medical Network - Hospitals and clinics network that includes the Healthway Multi-Specialty Clinics, QualiMed Group of Hospitals, FEU Nicanor Reyes Medical Foundation, Healthway Cancer Care Hospital, and Healthway Cebu Velez General Hospital
  - Generika Drugstore
  - I.E. Medica Inc.
  - MedEthix Inc.
- Ayala Education, Inc. (AEI)
  - University of Nueva Caceres - Ayala Education's flagship University
  - Affordable Private Education Center, Inc. (APEC Schools) - a joint venture between the Ayala Corporation and Pearson PLC's Affordable Learning Fund (Pearson ALF). It promotes affordable but high-quality education.
  - Professional Employment Program (PEP)
  - National Teacher's College (33%)

=== Nonprofit organizations ===
- Ayala Foundation
  - CENTEX
  - Ayala Museum
  - Philippine Development Foundation
  - Ayala Technology Business Incubator
  - Filipinas Heritage Library

=== Business process outsourcing, Logistics and Digital businesses ===
- AC Logistics
  - Glacier Megafridge - cold chain storage and logistics services
  - U-Freight Philippines - international freight forwarding
- LiveIt Investments, Ltd.
- Affinity Express
- HRMall
- Zalora Philippines

=== Divestments ===
- IQ BackOffice, Inc. (divested in 2016)
- The Insular Life Assurance Co., Ltd. - Mutual company owned by policyholders since 1987.
- Integreon (divested in 2016)
- Philippine FamilyMart CVS, Inc. - Joint venture with Stores Specialists, Inc., Japan FamilyMart, and Itochu Corporation. (acquired by Phoenix Petroleum Philippines, Inc. in 2018)
- Pilipinas Makro Inc. - initially a joint venture partnership among Ayala, SM Investments Corporation (SM Prime Holdings), and the Netherlands' SHV Holdings NV formed to own and operate Makro branches in the Philippines. (discontinued, 2004). To reopen with new partner CP Axtra in 2027.
- Pure Foods Corporation (sold to San Miguel Corporation in 2001)
- Stream Global Services (sold to Convergys in 2014 for $820 million)
- Muntinlupa–Cavite Expressway - the 4-kilometer (2.5 mi), 4-lane expressway connecting Daang Hari and South Luzon Expressway in Muntinlupa. (sold to Prime Asset Ventures Inc. of the Villar Group in August 2023)
- MT Technologies GmbH - German auto parts maker (sold to Callista Asset Management 18 GmbH in 2023)
- AirSWIFT (sold to Cebu Pacific in October 2024)
- KTM and Husqvarna Motorcycles - motorcycle brands distributor (divested to Lucky MAPI in October 2024)
- Entrego - courier and express parcel management that served Zalora Philippines (defunct, April 1, 2024 with some operations absorbed by Air21)
- KonsultaMD - a joint venture with Globe's 917Ventures (sold to Metro Pacific Investments Corporation in February, 2025)
- Maxus Philippines, Inc (discontinued, August 2025)
- Volkswagen Philippines (discontinued, September 30, 2025)
- Alabang Town Center - shopping mall in Muntinlupa (divested to Madrigal Family, December 2025)
- Air21 - air express and freight services (discontinued, 2025)
- Honda Cars Philippines, Inc. (divested, January 1, 2026)
