= Domingo Róxas =

Filipino businessman and industrialist (1782–1843)

Domíngo Róxas
- Born: Domingo Róxas y Ureta; 1782; Manila, Tondo province, Captaincy General of the Philippines
- Died: 1843 (aged 60–61); Manila, Tondo province, Captaincy General of the Philippines
- Known for: Founder of the modern-day Ayala Corporation
- Spouse: María Saturnina Ubaldo
- Children: 3, including Margarita

Domingo Róxas y Ureta (1782 – 1843) was a Filipino businessman and industrialist. He was the founder of Casa Roxas, which later evolved into the modern-day Ayala Corporation. He is a patriarch of Zóbel-Ayala-Roxas-Soriano clans, and is considered as a pioneer of Filipino nationalism together with Luis Rodríguez-Varela. Roxas advocated fiercely for the rights of native Filipinos.

== Biography ==
Domíngo Róxas y Ureta was the third of four children to parents Mariano Máximo de Báez Róxas y Romero, a doctor, and Ana María Ureta. He had primarily Spanish ancestry; one of his ancestors, Antonio Fernandez de Roxas, was also a Mexican immigrant who was born in Acapulco and emigrated to the Philippines in 1695.

Róxas married Maria Saturnina Ubaldo, a Mestiza de Sangley from the town of Sta. Cruz on June 8, 1813 at Minor Basilica of Our Lady of the Pillar. The couple lived together in the town of San Miguel and had three children; the philanthropist Margarita Róxas de Ayala, who inherited her father's advocacy for the natives, José Bonifacio Rojas y Ubaldo, and Mariano Ubaldo Rojas. Mariano co-founded the Academia de Dibujo y Pintura together with painter Damián Gabor Domingo.

== Casa Róxas ==
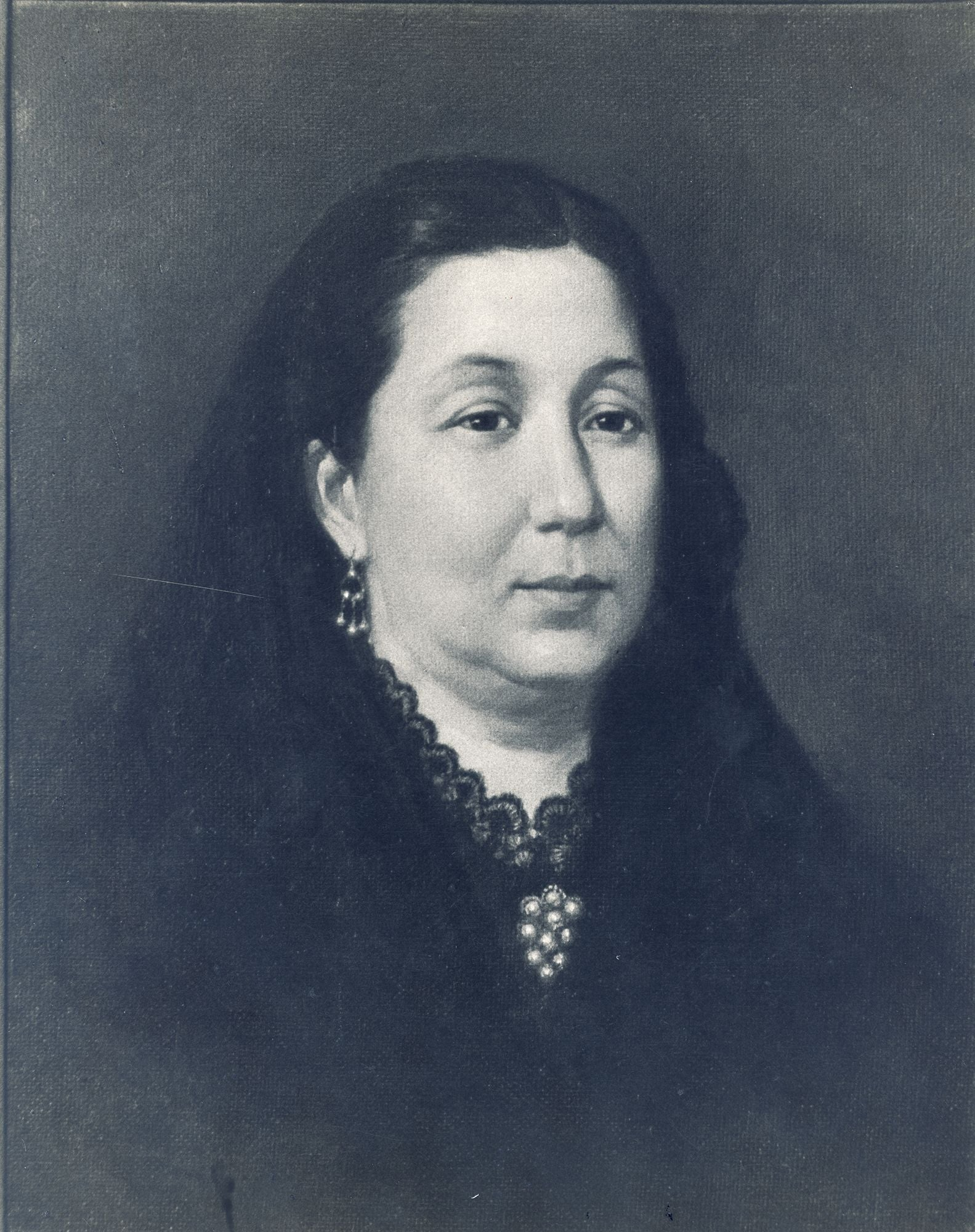
Margarita Roxas de Ayala, Roxas' daughter, who would take over his business at the age of 17 following his death

Even after the Royal Company of the Philippines had liberalized investment in agriculture, it stopped functioning in 1829. It was then declared dead in 1834, after the Philippines had just recently been opened up to foreign trade. Roxas then established Casa Róxas with his Basque business partner Antonio de Ayala, who had just arrived earlier in the Philippines together with his uncle, the Archbishop of Manila José Seguí, O.E.S.A. Casa Roxas focused on cultivation of coffee, sugar, indigo and, cotton. Casa Roxas also manufactured gun power, liquors and castings.

Ayala, Roxas' business partner, would later become the husband of his eldest daughter Margarita. Ayala and Margarita's daughter, Trinidad Roxas Ayala-Zobel, was the wife of Jacobo Z. Zobel. Trinidad and Carmen, both Roxas' granddaughers, would later be responsible for the name change to Ayala Corporation.

== Imprisonments ==
Roxas was accused in 1823 by the government as a sympathizer of the revolt of Andrés Novales. He was accused again in 1841 uprising of Hermano Pule. He was an easy target because of his enlightenment ideas influenced by Sociedad Económica de los Amigos del País that originated in the Spanish Peninsula. It manifested through his advocacies for reforms which he sees would benefit the natives and the creoles. In 1842, he was arrested for the third and final time in Fort Santiago. His daughter Margarita then sailed to the Spanish peninsula to personally ask Isabella II Queen of Spain for her fathers release. The Queen ordered the immediate release of her father, but Roxas had already died back in Fort Santiago in 1843.
