= Society of Saint Vincent de Paul =

Christian community service organization

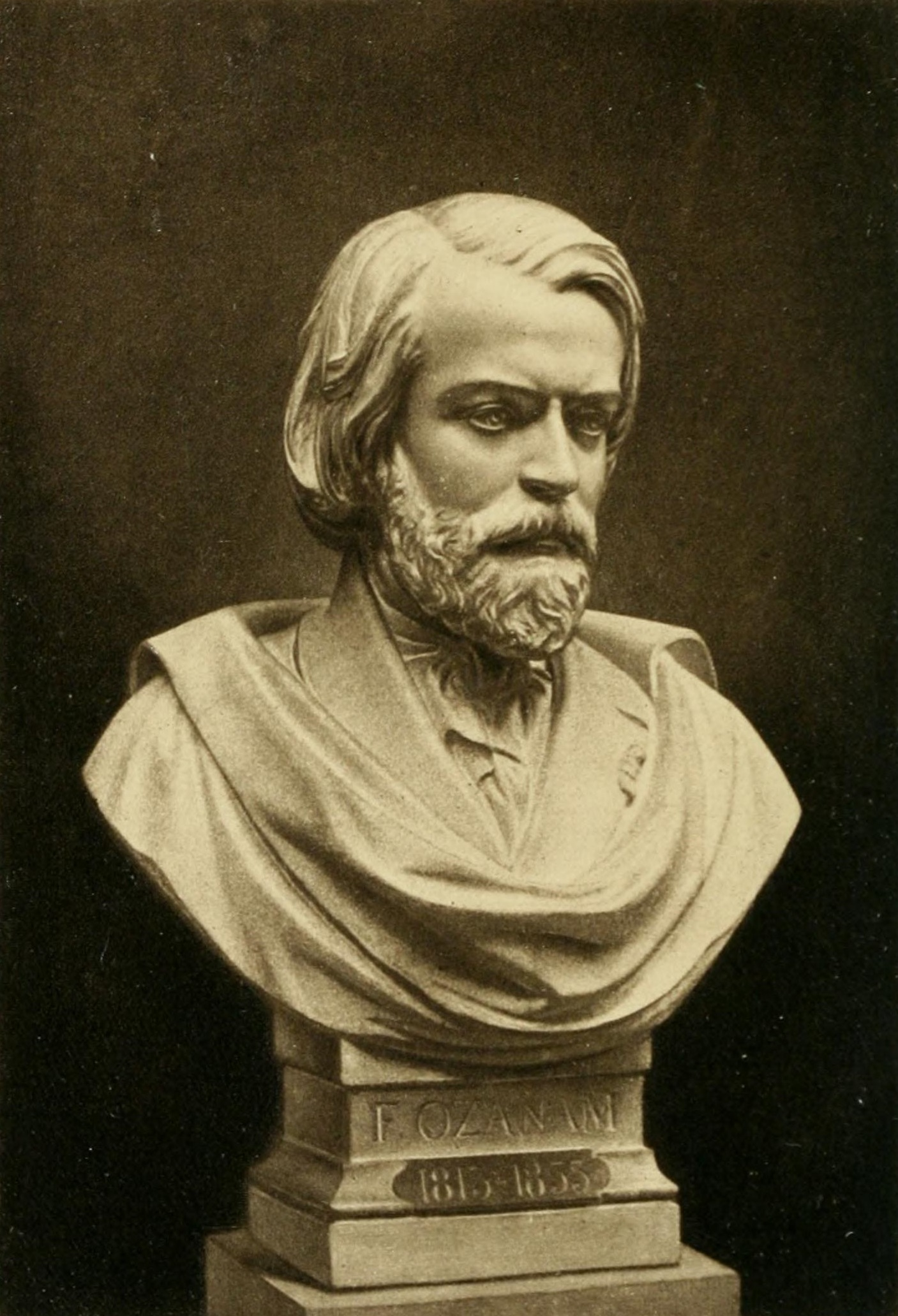
- Blessed Frédéric Ozanam
- Named after: St. Vincent de Paul
- Founded: April 23, 1833; 193 years ago
- Founder: Blessed Frédéric Ozanam; Mr. Emmanuel Bailly
- Purpose: Sanctification of members through service of the poor
- Region served: 155 countries
- Members: 800,000
- Superior General: Fr. Bertin Sanon, R.S.V.
- Volunteers: 1.5 million
- Website: ssvpglobal.org
- Remarks: Slogan: serviens in spe

The Society of Saint Vincent de Paul (SVP or SVdP or SSVP) is an international voluntary organization in the Catholic Church, founded in 1833 for the sanctification of its members by personal service of the poor. Started by Frédéric Ozanam and Emmanuel-Joseph Bailly de Surcy and named after Vincent de Paul, the organization is part of the global Vincentian Family of Catholic organizations.

Innumerable Catholic parishes have established "conferences", most of which affiliate with a diocesan council. Among its varied efforts to offer material help to the poor or needy, the Society also has thrift stores or "op shops" which sell donated goods at a low price and raise money for the poor. There are a great variety of outreach programs sponsored by the local conferences and councils, addressing local needs for social services.

== History ==
=== France ===
The Society of St. Vincent de Paul was founded in 1833 to help impoverished people living in the slums of Paris, France. The primary figure behind the Society's founding was Blessed Frédéric Ozanam, a French lawyer, author, and professor in the Sorbonne. Frédéric collaborated with Emmanuel Bailly, editor of the Tribune Catholique, in reviving a student organization which had been suspended during the revolutionary activity of July 1830. Ozanam was 20 years old when he founded the Society. He was beatified by Pope John Paul II in 1997. Emmanuel Bailly was chosen as the first President.

The Society took Saint Vincent de Paul as its patron under the influence of Sister Rosalie Rendu, DC. Sister Rosalie, beatified in November 1999 by Pope John Paul II, was a member of the Daughters of Charity of St. Vincent de Paul, earlier known for her work with people in the slums of Paris. She guided Frédéric and his companions in their approach towards those in need.

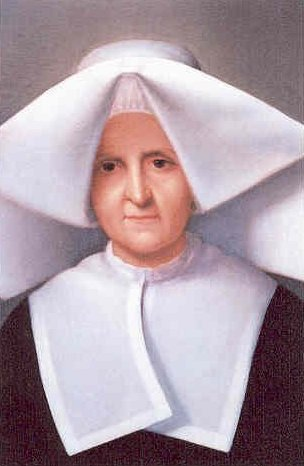
Blessed Rosalie Rendu, DC

SVP gradually expanded outside Paris in the mid-19th century and received benefactors in places such as Tours where figures such as the Venerable Leo Dupont, known as the Holy Man of Tours, became collaborators.

The Society is part of the Vincentian Family which also includes two congregations founded by St. Vincent de Paul – the Congregation of the Mission with Vincentian priests and brothers and the Ladies of Charity – along with the Sisters of Charity in the Setonian tradition and several others, including some religious groups that are part of the Anglican Communion like the Company of Mission Priests.

=== England and Wales ===
Venerable Fr. Ignatius Spencer from London came to know the Society during his visits to Paris. Parisian Adolphe Baudon, who would assume the presidency of the society in 1847, visited London in 1842 and persuaded Spencer to write about the Society in the Catholic Magazine. Then in January 1844 M. Pagliano, a London restaurateur and recent convert to Catholicism, gathered together 13 Catholic men and the first English SVP conference was founded. Early initiatives included the formation of the Catholic Shoe Black Brigade, providing boys with gainful employment and the first home of "the Rescue Society" which under various names still offers child care in many dioceses.

In 2013 there were more than 10,000 members in more than 1,000 Conferences in the United Kingdom, making over 500,000 recorded visits annually to more than 100,000 people.

=== United States ===
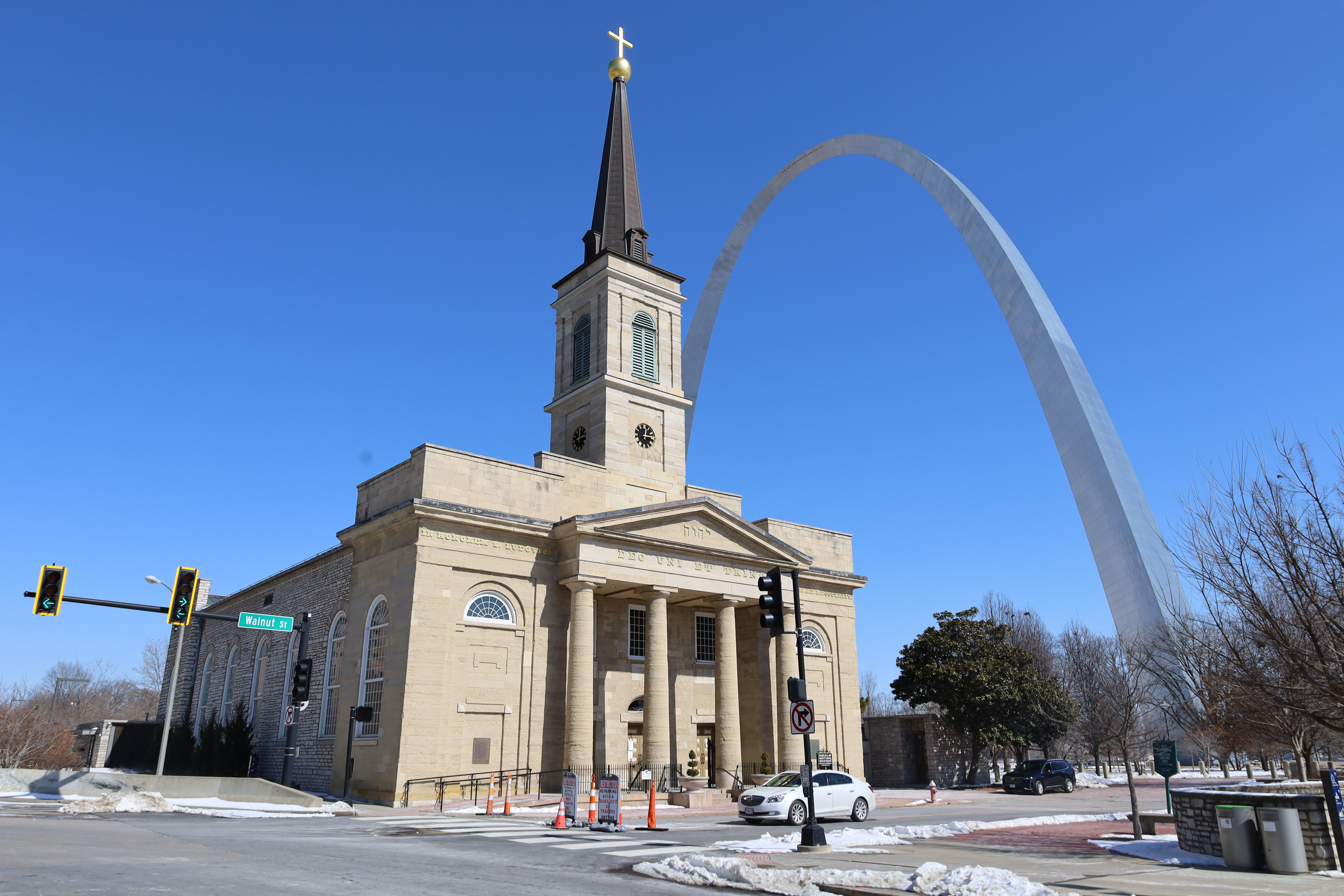
Old Cathedral of St. Louis, Missouri, 1834

The Society's first Conference in the United States was established in 1845 in St. Louis, Missouri, at the Basilica of St. Louis King of France, or "Old Cathedral". Fr. John Timon, CM, had learned of the Society while visiting with his Vincentian superiors in Paris. From Dublin, Ireland, he brought to St. Louis copies of the SVP Rule. On 16 November 1845, Bishop Peter Richard Kenrick dedicated the new St. Vincent de Paul church on South Eighth Street and invited Timon to preach. Timon discussed the Society in his sermon, in the presence of prominent laymen who took hold of the idea and held an organizational meeting on 20 November 1845. The Conference included Moses Linton, founder of the St. Louis Medical and Surgical Journal, and as chair Judge Bryan Mullanphy who would become mayor of St. Louis. Bishop Kenrick appointed Fr. Ambrose Heim as spiritual advisor to the Conference.

=== Australia ===
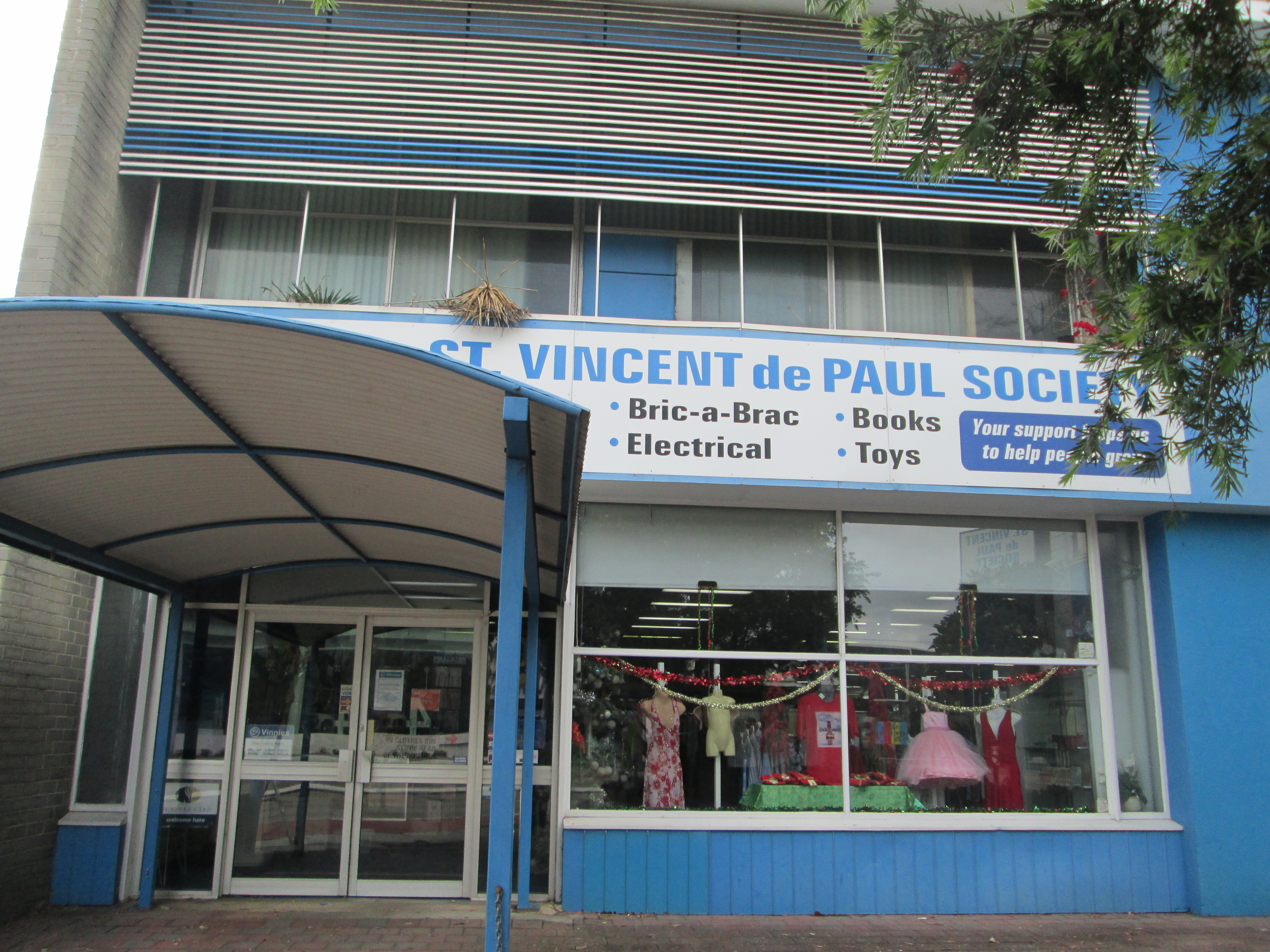
St Vincent de Paul Store at Manly in New South Wales

Gerald Ward was born in London in 1806 and was recruited for the Melbourne mission by the pioneering father, later bishop, Patrick Geoghegan. Ward was familiar with SVP from London and, observing the plight of the poor after the Victorian gold rush, established the Society in Australia in 1854. Ward served as its first president and helped establish the SVP orphanage in South Melbourne.

In March 2023, Mark Gaetani was officially inducted as the 18th National Council President by Archbishop Christopher Prowse at St Christopher's Cathedral, Manuka in Canberra, Australian Capital Territory, taking over from Claire Victory.

=== New Zealand ===
Fr. Chataigner, SM, established the first Conference in New Zealand in July 1867, but did not affiliate with the Council-General in Paris. The first to affiliate was the Wellington Conference founded in 1908 by Fr. Petitjean, SM, and Charles O'Neill, followed by other Conferences out of Wellington.

=== Scotland ===
Charles O'Neill was born in Glasgow in 1828. He graduated as a member of the Institution of Civil Engineers. Upon graduation he had joined the Society of St Vincent de Paul. He was secretary at Dumbarton in 1851. He led the St Vincent de Paul Society in the Western Districts of Scotland between 1859 and 1863. By 1863 he was president of the Superior Council of Glasgow and a member of the Council-General in Paris.

=== India ===
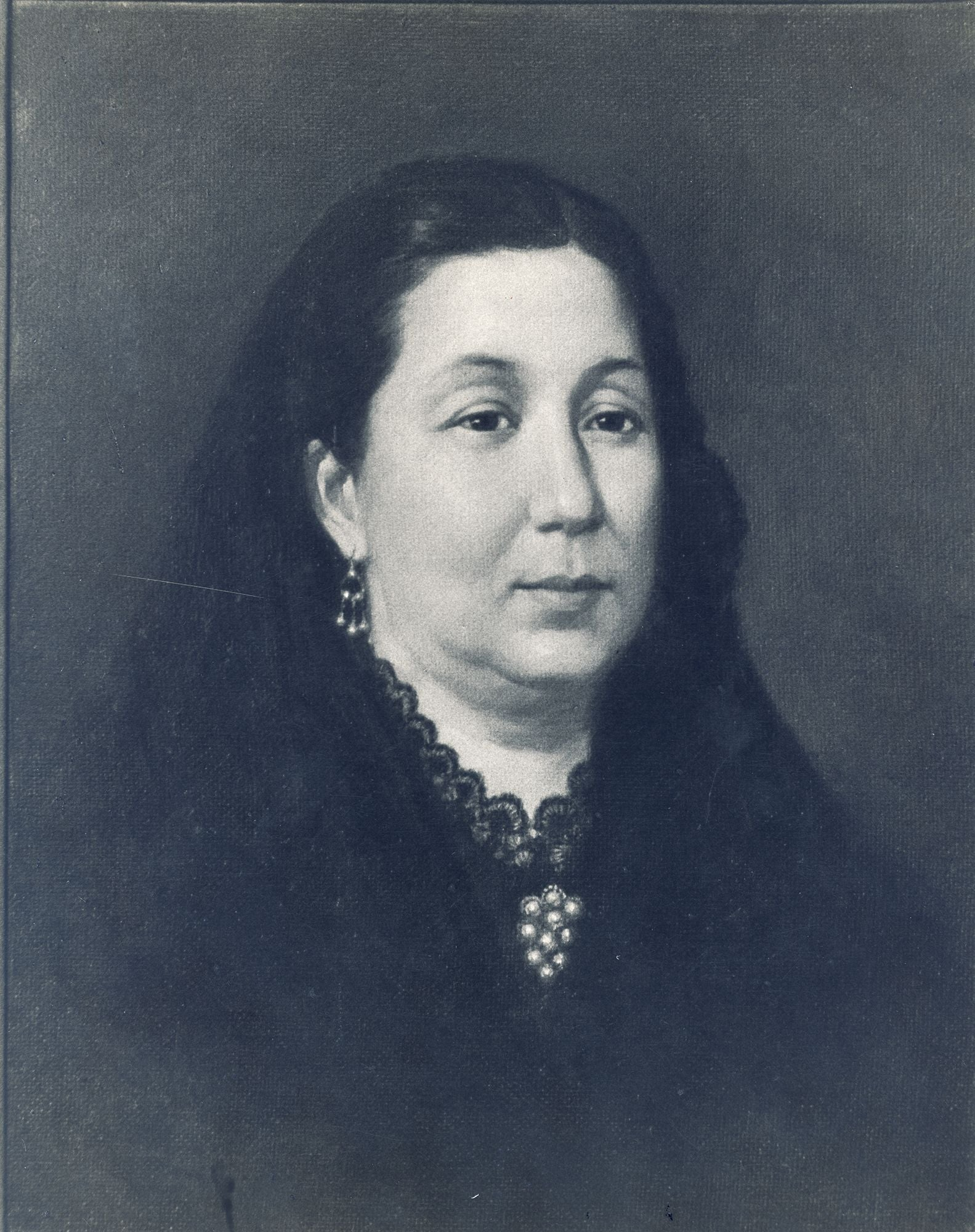
Margarita Róxas de Ayala

The Society was first introduced in India by the French Missionaries at Pondicherry during the Year 1852–53 as a non-aggregated Conference. The Society was officially started in India in 1863 when some conferences in Bombay were aggregated and the Bombay Particular Council was instituted. Then onwards the Society continued to grow in India. On 09.11.1953 the Superior Council of India was established and instituted with the Council General International. The Superior Council of India was renamed as National Council of India on 06.08.1973. The National Council of India has its Headquarters in Mumbai and the present President’s secretariat is at Chennai, Tamil Nadu with the election of Bro. S. Jude ZR Mangalraj as the 14th National President of India with effect from 28th February 2021.

The National Council of India is registered under the Income Tax Act 1961 with exemption under Sec 80G, FCRA under the ministry of Home Affairs and Societies Regn. Act and Bombay Public Trust Act 1950.

=== Philippines ===
The Society started in the Philippines when the 15 Daughters of Charity of Saint Vincent de Paul arrived in Manila on 22nd July 1862 at the request of the Archbishop of Manila, Gregorio Melitón Martínez Santa Cruz and philanthropist Margarita Róxas de Ayala to administer the Colegio de la Inmaculada Concepcion de la Concordia, a free school for poor girls. The Sisters and Margarita Róxas de Ayala, who became its president, eventually laid the foundations for the local conferences of the Society.

== Activities ==
The Society numbers about 800,000 members in some 140 countries worldwide, whose members operate through "conferences". A Conference may be based out of a church, school, community center, hospital, etc., and is composed of Catholic volunteers who pursue their own Christian growth in the service of the poor. Some Conferences exist without affiliating with any local Council, and so are not counted in statistics. Non-Catholics may join and the Society serves all regardless of their personal beliefs.

=== Ireland ===
The Society of St. Vincent de Paul was founded in Dublin on 16 December 1844. It is now the largest voluntary charitable organisation in Ireland, making it one of Ireland's best known and most widely supported organisations of social concern and action. It has over 11,500 volunteers, active in every county in Ireland. During its history it has helped people in need through the Great Famine, a Civil War, a War Of Independence, Two World Wars, and several economic recessions.

=== Australia ===
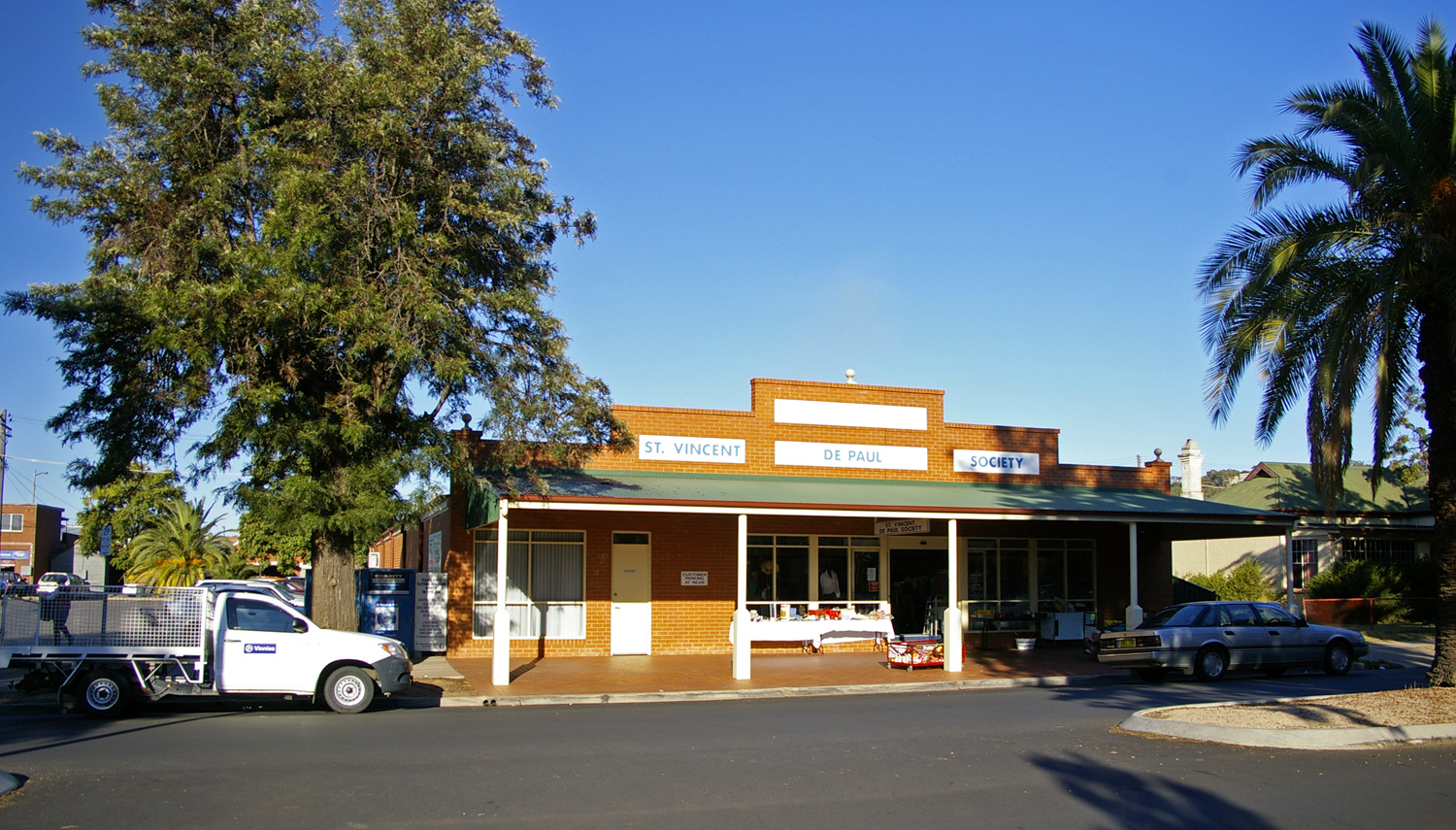
SVP Opportunity Shop in Wagga Wagga, New South Wales

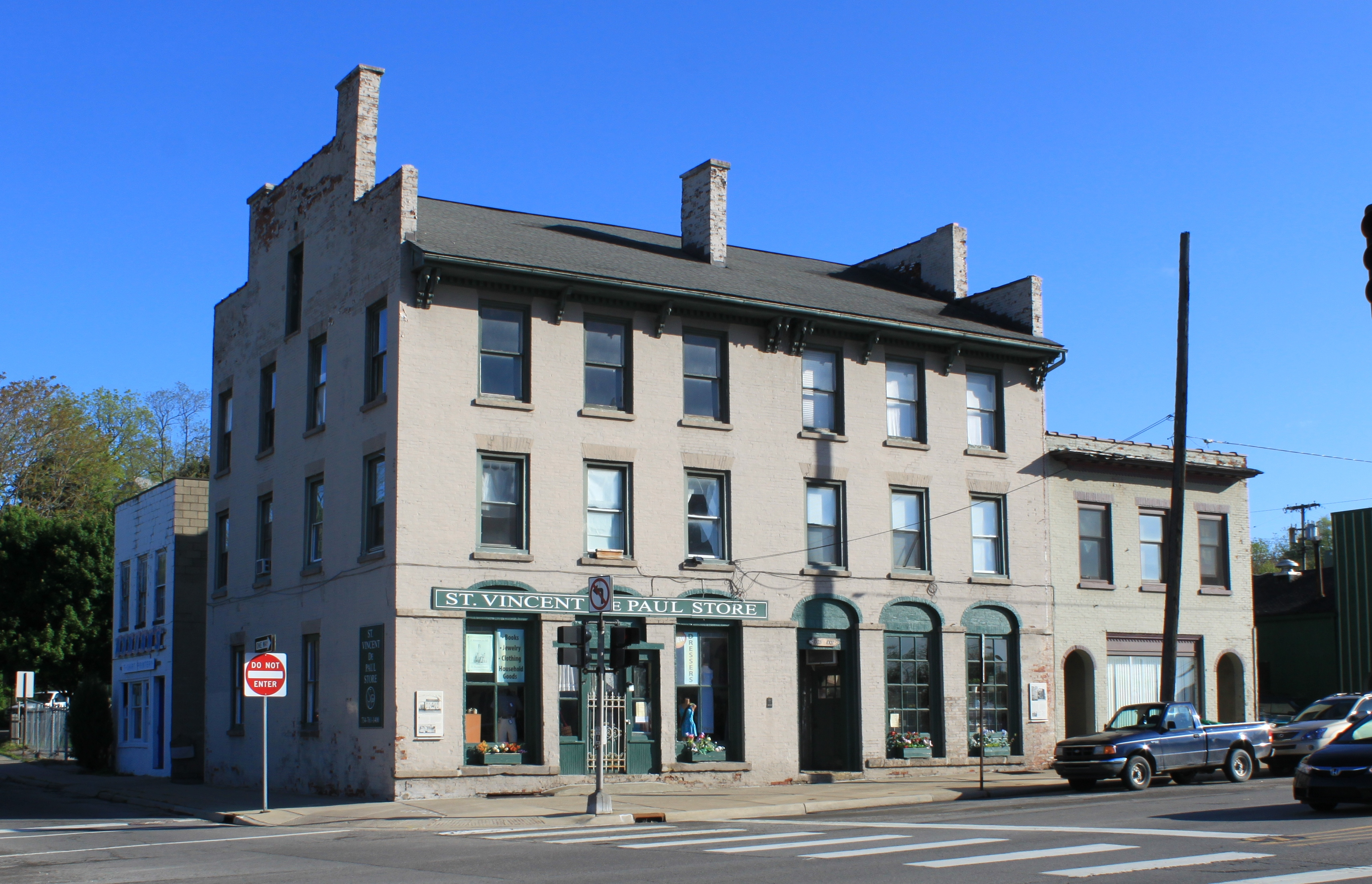
St. Vincent de Paul Thrift Store in historic Anson Brown Building, Ann Arbor, MI

In Australia, "Vinnies" workers and volunteers number about 39,000 in 2025, down from 58,000 the decade before. Works include conferences, Special Works, and Vinnies op shops, assisting over 1,800,000 people in Australia each year.

In 1996, Ozcare was established as a special work of the society. It provides aged care and disability centres and services.

In 2018, the St Vincent de Paul Society Queensland was named as one of the Queensland Greats by Queensland Premier Annastacia Palaszczuk in a ceremony at the Queensland Art Gallery on 8 June 2018.

=== New Zealand ===
In New Zealand, SVP operates in 23 regions with over 50 shops which serve as centres for welfare service, including food banks and food trucks. Most Catholic schools have Young Vinnies who help with fundraising and with training for dealing directly with the poor. The work is varied, following the Vinnie motto: "No act of charity is foreign to the society."

=== United States ===
The national headquarters is in St. Louis. Membership in the United States in 2015 exceeded 97,000 in 4,400 communities. Expenditures to people in poverty were $473,821,563. Programs include visits to homes, prisons, and hospitals, housing assistance, disaster relief, job training and placement, food pantries, dining halls, clothing, transportation and utility costs, care for the elderly, and medicine. Revenue is raised through a large network of thrift stores.

One of the working companies is Aurora Glass Foundry that recycles scrap glass and turns it into various decorative glass products for sale.

=== Monaco ===
The first Conference of the Society of Saint Vincent de Paul in Monaco was created in 1876. The Conference of the immaculate Conception of Monaco-City whose commemorative plaque is on the Place de la Visitation, thanks among others to Monsieur Thheuret, Apostolic Protonotary in Monaco and to Mr Gastaldi, Mayor of Monaco. Mr. Theuret was appointed first Honorary President. The Vice-President of Honor being the Marquis de la Riva, first Chambellan of the Sovereign Prince.

The first active President was Lieutenant Plati. The Sovereign Prince, Prince Charles III, was one of the first benefactors. At the time, the Immaculate Conception Conference was attached to the Particular Council of the Nice Conferences.

St. Vincent de Paul Society in Monaco is located on 32 Rue Grimaldi, in the Condamine neighbourhood.

== Saints and Blesseds ==
Saints

- Pier Giorgio Frassati (6 April 1901 – 4 July 1925), mountaineer, and also a member of the Third Order of Saint Dominic, canonized on 7 September 2025
- Gianna Beretta Molla (4 October 1922 – 28 April 1962), doctor and mother, canonized on 16 May 2004

Blesseds

- Antoine-Frédéric Ozanam (23 April 1813 – 8 September 1853), founder of the Society, beatified on 22 August 1997
- Alcide-Vital (Jean-Joseph) Lataste (5 September 1832 – 10 March 1869), priest of the Order of Preachers and member of the Society, beatified on 3 June 2012
- Contardo Ferrini (5 April 1859 – 17 October 1902), jurist, legal scholar, and also a Franciscan Tertiary, beatified on 13 April 1947
- Manuel Luque Ramos and 4 Companions (died 22 July and 5 August 1936), Martyrs of the Spanish Civil War, beatified on 18 November 2023
- Ceferino Giménez Malla (26 August 1861 – 9 August 1936), Romani layperson martyred during the Spanish Civil War, beatified on 4 May 1997
- Maria Jorda Botella (26 January 1905 – 26 September 1936), member of the Society martyred during the Spanish Civil War, beatified on 11 March 2001
- Josef Mayr-Nusser (27 December 1910 – 24 February 1945), "Martyr of the First Commandment", killed by the Nazis because of refusal to take the Hitler Oath and to be drafted as a Nazi soldier, beatified on 18 March 2017

== St. Vincent de Paul Charity Shop ==
The St. Vincent de Paul Society runs charity shops in many countries including Australia, New Zealand, the United States, Ireland, and Canada. These shops are organized by local chapters in St. Louis, Cincinnati area with 7, Omaha, Nebraska, Dayton, Ohio, Des Moines, Iowa, Florida, California, Baton Rouge, Pennsylvania with 24, Western Oregon, Georgia, Arizona, Idaho, and Western Washington. Items from clothing to automobiles are sold for market price. Money, and many times donated items, are distributed to the poor.
