= Anson Brown Building =

Commercial building

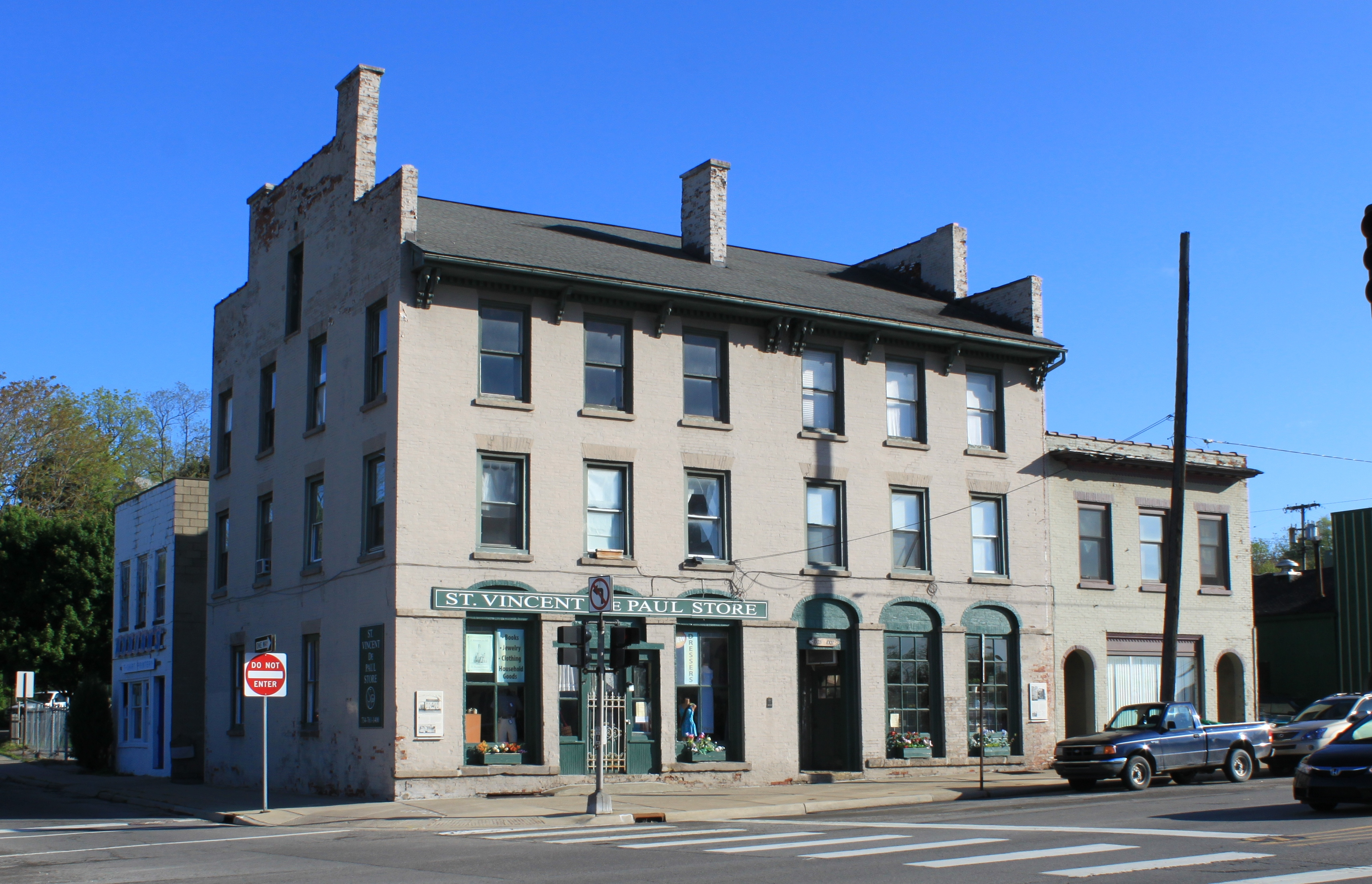
- The building in 2010
- Interactive map of the Anson Brown Building area

General information
- Location: Lower Town, Ann Arbor, Michigan, U.S.
- Coordinates: 42°17′21.36″N 83°44′21.89″W

Technical details
- Floor count: 3

The Anson Brown Building is the oldest extant commercial building in Ann Arbor, Michigan. It was erected in 1832 by developer Anson Brown in the Lower Town area at 1001 Broadway St. as a general store. It is located at the intersection of Swift and Broadway streets and abuts against the Edward L. Fuller building.

The building design was influenced by Dutch architecture with parapet end walls. It was owned for over 60 years by the Colvin family until it was purchased from them in 1989. Two historical markers on the front of the building commemorate the Underground Railroad and Dr. Daniel B. Kellog, the "clairvoyant physician."

From 1968 to 2020, the building housed a St. Vincent De Paul thrift store. The building was significantly affected by an arson fire in 2017, which destroyed the thrift store's inventory. The thrift store temporarily operated out of the nearby St. Thomas the Apostle Church until reopening in the building in 2018. Since the early 2020s, the building has housed Sic Transit Cycles, a bicycle shop.

== Gallery ==
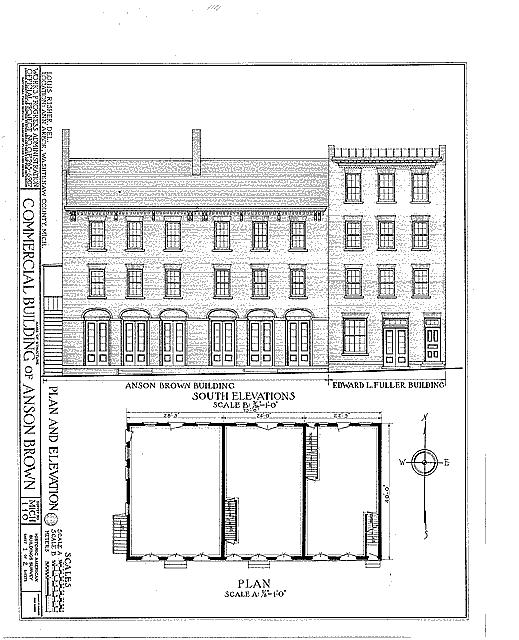
WPA architectural drawing, 1930's

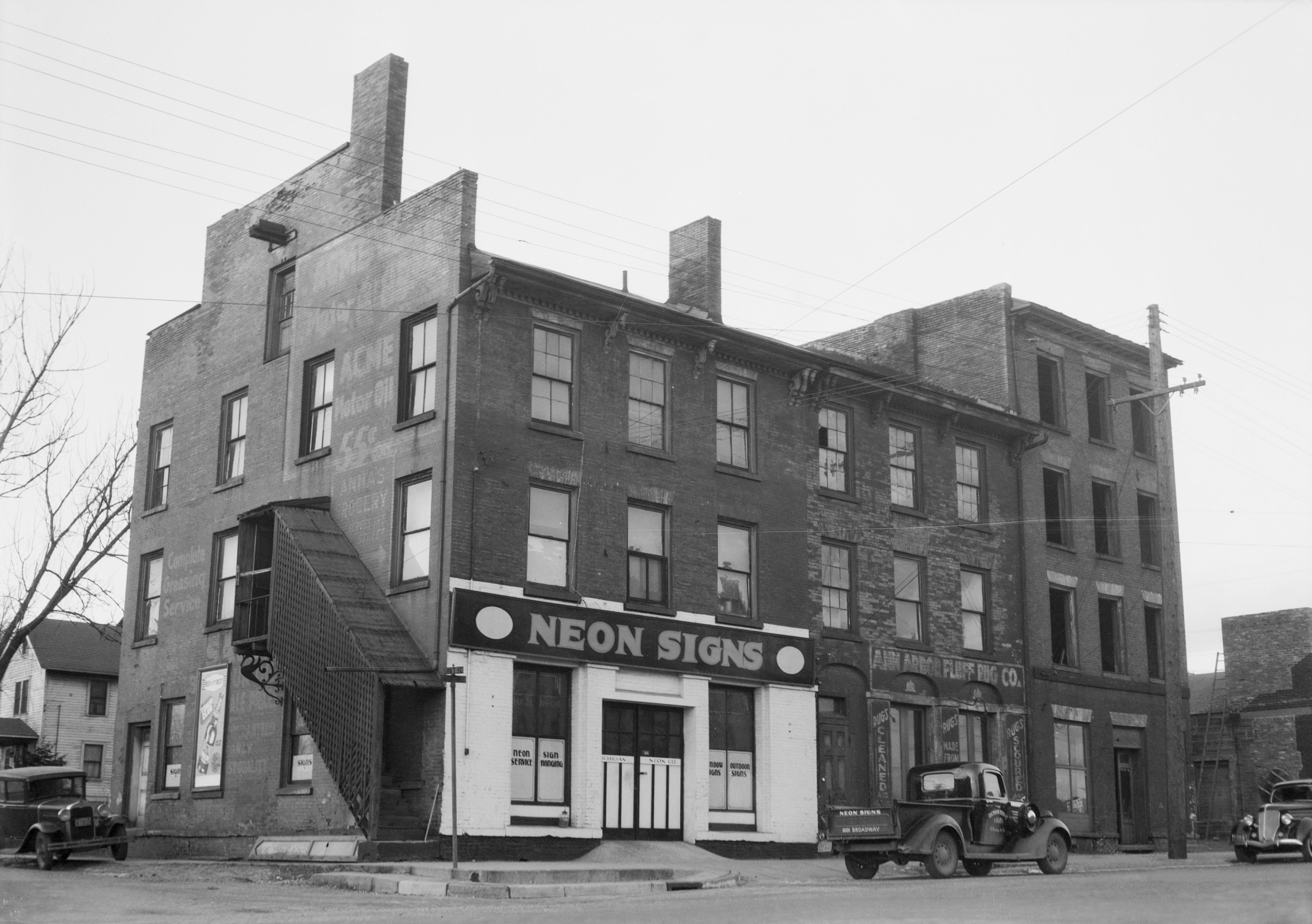
Historic American Buildings Survey photo, 1930s

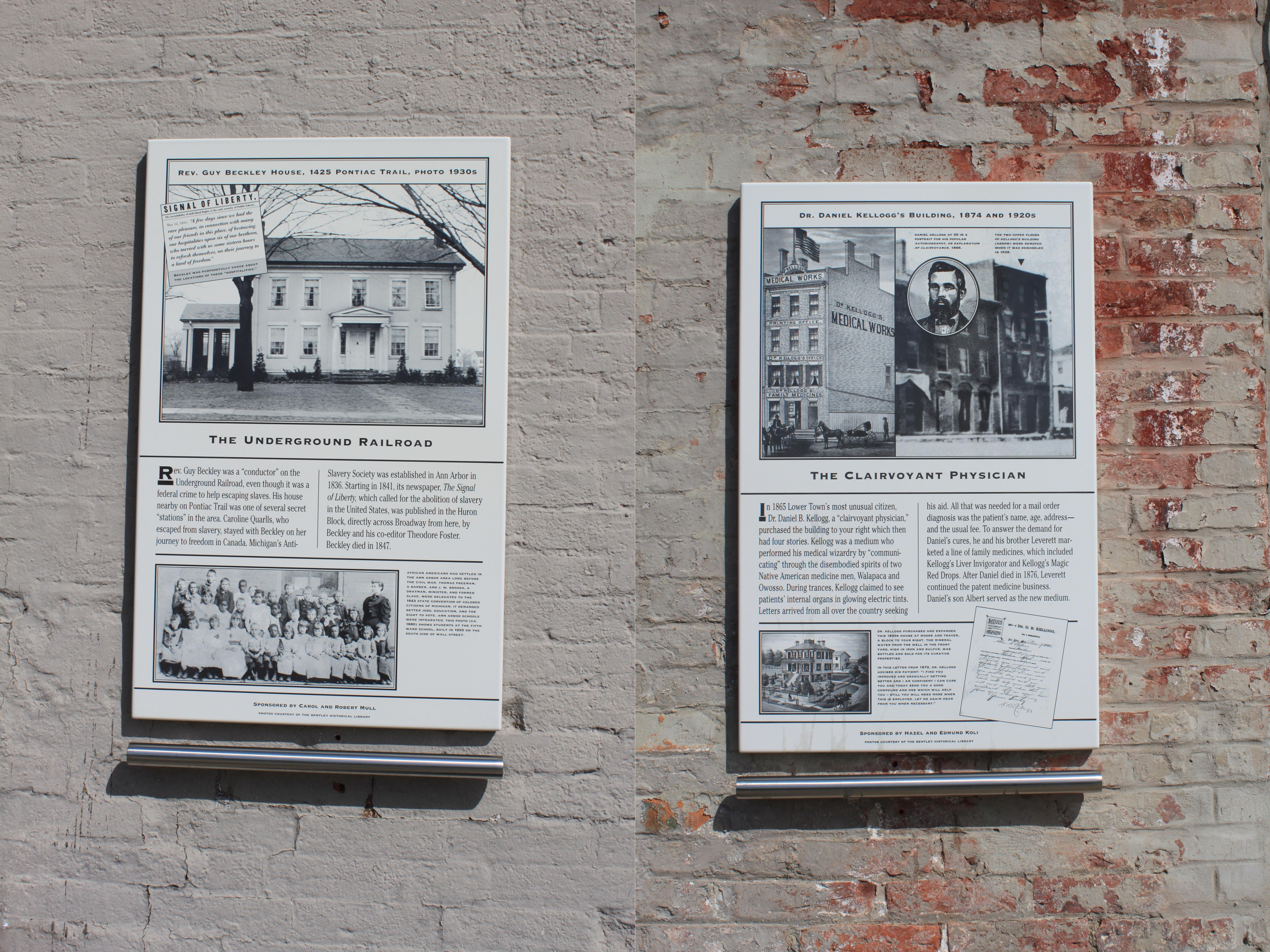
Historical markers
