= Margarita Roxas de Ayala =

Filipino philanthropist and entrepreneur

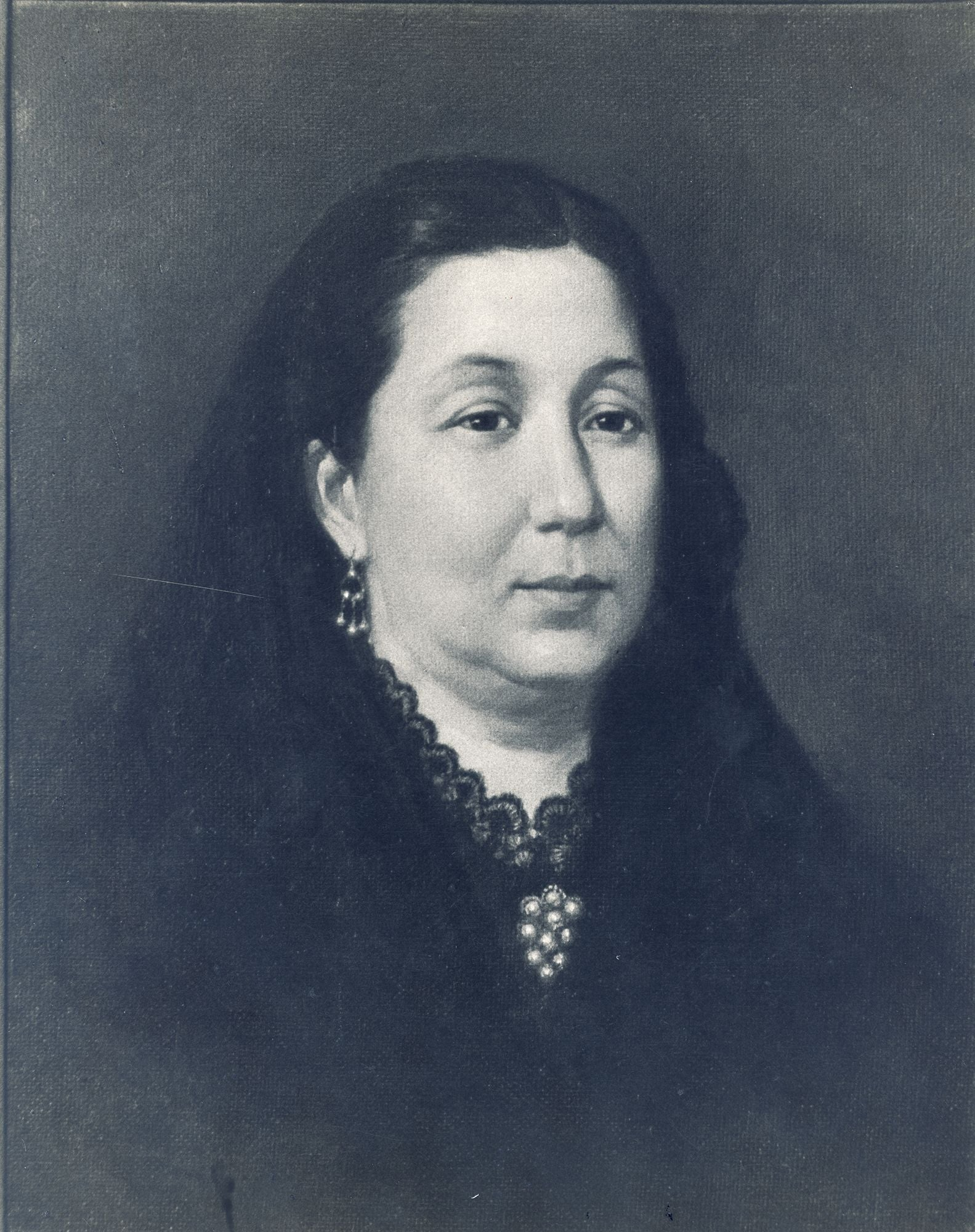
- Born: Margarita Roxas y Ubaldo; July 20, 1826; San Miguel, Manila
- Died: November 1, 1869 (aged 43)
- Resting place: San Agustin Church (Manila)
- Occupations: Philanthropist, entrepreneur
- Known for: Establishing Bank of the Philippine Islands and Concordia College (Manila)
- Spouse: Antonio de Ayala
- Children: 3
- Father: Domingo Róxas

Margarita Roxas de Ayala (July 20, 1826 — November 1, 1869) was a Filipino philanthropist and entrepreneur.

== Early life ==
Margarita Roxas y Ubaldo was born on July 20, 1826 in San Miguel, Manila in the Philippines to a family of mixed Spanish and Filipino heritage. She was the only daughter of businessman Domingo Róxas and Maria Saturnina Ubaldo.

Throughout her childhood, her father was imprisoned multiple times by Spanish colonial authorities on the suspicion of his participation in the uprisings led by Andres Novales in 1823 and Apolinario de la Cruz in 1841. Roxas de Ayala sailed to the Spanish peninsula to personally ask Isabella II Queen of Spain for her fathers' release. The Queen ordered the immediate release of her father, but Roxas had already died back in Fort Santiago in 1843.

== Career and philanthropy ==
Margarita Roxas de Ayala's grave in Manila

After her father's death in 1843, Roxas de Ayala became the leader of his business Casa Roxas (today called the Ayala Corporation) at the age of 17. She also married her father's business partner, Antonio de Ayala, and together they expanded the business into the diverse sectors it encompasses today: real estate, alcohol production, and mining, to name a few.

In 1851, Roxas de Ayala co-founded the Bank of the Philippine Islands with her husband.

In 1868, she established the Roman Catholic higher education institution, Concordia College, in Manila. She donated her summer home to the campus and focused its goals on education for underprivileged women.

Doña Margarita Roxas de Ayala Auditorium at Concordia College

== Legacy ==
Roxas de Ayala died on November 1, 1869 at the age of 43. Her daughters, Carmen and Trinidad, took over Casa Roxas and renamed it Ayala Corporation, the name that is still in use today.
