= Pinoy pride =

Filipino nationalist philosophy

Pinoy pride or Filipino pride is an exceptionalist outlook on being Filipino and is an expression of Filipino nationalism.

Pinoy pride is an assertion that the people and culture should promote the interests of the Philippines by developing, and maintaining a national identity based on largely shared characteristics such as language, race, religion or political goals.

== Definition and manifestations ==
Pride in being Filipino; April 1996
	Youth	Adults*
Very proud	69%	53%
Quite proud	24%	36%
Not very proud	4%	9%
Not at all proud	3%	2%
(*) Above 18 years old, survey results for Adults released in April 1993. Sample: 1,200
Source: Social Weather Stations (SWS)

Different manifestations or observations concerning the Filipino people have been attributed to Pinoy pride.

One of the more common manifestations of Pinoy pride is when Filipinos consider the success or victory of Philippine citizens or foreigners of Philippine descent—such as boxer Manny Pacquiao, chess prodigy Wesley So, singer, actress, and columnist Lea Salonga, singer Jake Zyrus, and American Idol season 11 runner-up Jessica Sanchez—as a national achievement.

The way Filipinos cope in the midst of natural disasters and problems, with some still maintaining a resolute attitude amidst such trials, has been attributed to the resiliency of the Filipino people as a whole.

== Reception ==
The University of the Philippines Third World Studies Center has linked Pinoy pride's manifestation of Filipino resiliency to German sociologist Ulrich Beck's concept of narrated attention, "where the parlance of resiliency ultimately detracts from, rather than allow for, a critical stance towards the zeitgeist of our time".

Dr. Norman G. Owen criticized the proliferation of hoaxes and exaggeration of historical facts in an effort to build on Pinoy pride, such as the claim that a Filipino man named Agapito Flores was the inventor of the fluorescent lamp. Owen said that such exaggerations give an impression that by resorting to such acts, Filipinos, as a people do not have much to be proud of, which he believes, is not the original intention of such people engaged in such acts.
