= Andrés Novales =

Filipino Military Leader and Emperor of the Philippines

Emperor of the Philippine Islands (self-proclaimed)
- In pretendence June 1, 1823 – June 2, 1823
- Preceded by: Position established
- Succeeded by: Position abolished

Personal details
- Born: Andrés López de Novales y Castro c. 1795 Intramuros, Manila, Captaincy General of the Philippines, Viceroyalty of New Spain
- Died: 2 June 1823 (aged 27–28) Palacio del Gobernador, Intramuros, Manila, Captaincy General of the Philippines, Kingdom of Spain
- Spouse: Laureana San Lucas
- Profession: Soldier

Military service
- Branch/service: Spanish Army
- Years of service: 1814-1823
- Rank: Captain
- Unit: 1st Light Infantry Battalion (Manila)

Andrés Novales (c. 1795 – 2 June 1823) was a Filipino captain in the Spanish Army in the Philippines, and the self-proclaimed Emperor of the Philippines.

His unease about the treatment of Creole soldiers led him to start a revolt in 1823 that eventually inspired José Rizal. He successfully captured Intramuros and was proclaimed Emperor of the Philippines by his followers. However, he was defeated within the day by Spanish reinforcements from Pampanga.

== Early life and career ==
Novales' father was a captain in the Spanish Army, while his mother was born to a prominent family in the Philippines. According to the Filipino author Nick Joaquin, he was a Filipino Creole of Mexican descent. He became a cadet at the age of nine and a lieutenant at fourteen. When he heard of the Peninsular War, an existing war between Spain and France, he sought his senior officer's consent to go to Madrid. Despite being demoted to a volunteer soldier with no rank after arriving in Spain, he returned to the Philippines with the rank of captain. His zeal for service had not waned, earning him the envy and ire of other military officers – something which Governor-General Juan Antonio Martínez later used against Novales.

== Novales revolt ==
Novales' unease with the way Spanish authorities treated creoles later grew, reaching its climax when peninsulars were shipped to the Philippines to replace Creole officers. He found the sympathy of many Creoles, including Luis Rodríguez Varela ("El Conde Filipino") as well as demoted Latin American officers in the Spanish Army. "Officers in the army of the Philippines were almost totally composed of Americans," observed the Spanish historian José Montero y Vidal. "They received in great disgust the arrival of peninsular officers as reinforcements, partly because they supposed they would be shoved aside in the promotions and partly because of racial antagonisms." As punishment for this dissent, many military officers and public officials were exiled, including Novales, who was exiled to Mindanao to fight pirates. Undeterred, he secretly returned to Manila.

On the night of June 1, 1823, Novales, along with a certain sub-lieutenant Ruiz and other subordinates in the King's Regiment, as well as discontented former Latino officers "americanos", composed mostly of Mexicans with a sprinkling of Creoles and mestizos from the now independent nations of Colombia, Venezuela, Peru, Chile, Argentina and Costa Rica, went out to start a revolt. Along with 800 Filipinos which his sergeants recruited, they seized the Governor-General's Palace, the Manila Cathedral, the city's cabildo (city hall) and other important government buildings in Intramuros.

Failing to find the Governor-General, they killed the lieutenant governor and former governor-general Mariano Fernandez de Folgueras. Folgueras was the one that suggested replacing Creole officers with peninsulars. The soldiers shouted ¡Viva el Emperador Novales! ("Long live the Emperor Novales!") Surprisingly, the townsfolk followed Novales and his troops as they marched into Manila. They eventually failed to seize Fort Santiago because Andrés' brother Mariano, who commanded the citadel, refused to open its gates. Authorities rushed soldiers to the fort upon learning that it was still holding out against the rebels. Novales was reportedly "everywhere" during the Spanish Attack motivating his troops and was captured on the battlefield.

At 5:00 pm of June 2, Novales, Ruiz, and 21 sergeants were executed by firing squad in a garden near Puerta del Postigo. In his last minutes, Novales declared that he and his comrades shall set an example of fighting for freedom. Mariano was initially to be executed as well for being Andrés' brother, but the crowd pleaded for his freedom with the argument that he had saved the government from being overthrown. Mariano received a monthly pension of ₱14, but went mad after the execution.

== See also ==
- Filipino nationalism

Regnal titles
New title	Emperor of the Philippines; 1 June 1823 - 2 June 1823	Succeeded by None (Title abolished)
