= Filipino nationalism =

Political nationalism in the Philippines

Filipino nationalism refers to the establishment and support of a political identity associated with the modern nation-state of the Philippines, leading to a wide-ranging campaign for political, social, and economic freedom in the Philippines. This gradually emerged from various political and armed movements throughout most of the Spanish East Indies—but which has long been fragmented and inconsistent with contemporary definitions of such nationalism—as a consequence of more than three centuries of Spanish rule. These movements are characterized by the upsurge of anti-colonialist sentiments and ideals which peaked in the late 19th century led mostly by the ilustrado or landed, educated elites, whether peninsulares, insulares, or native (Indio). This served as the backbone of the first nationalist revolution in Asia, the Philippine Revolution of 1896. The modern concept would later be fully actualized upon the inception of a Philippine state with its contemporary borders after being granted independence by the United States by the 1946 Treaty of Manila.

== Background ==
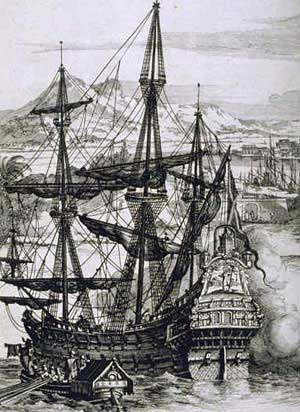
Painting of a Spanish galleon during Manila-Acapulco Trade

In the years before the 11th century, the Philippines was divided into numerous principalities known as barangays, a name derived from Malayan boats called balangays. These small political units were ruled by datus, rajahs or sultans.

In 1565, European colonization began in earnest when Spanish explorer Miguel López de Legazpi arrived from Mexico and formed the first European settlements in Cebu, founding the Captaincy General of the Philippines. Beginning with just five ships and five hundred men accompanied by Augustinian monks, and further strengthened in 1567 by two hundred soldiers, he was able to repel competing Portuguese colonizers and to create the foundations for the Spanish colonization of the Archipelago. In 1571, the Spanish occupied the kingdoms of Maynila and Tondo and established Manila as the capital of the Captaincy General of the Philippines and the Spanish East Indies. This Spanish colonization united the Philippine archipelago into a single political entity.

Luzon has been the dominant island since the era of Spanish colonialism and played an important role in the national movement. While predominantly Christian, the southern islands (Mindanao, and the Sulu Archipelago) have a significant Muslim population since the 14th century, having been established by traders and missionaries from several sultanates in the wider Malay Archipelago, along the routes that follow Borneo's coast.

=== Economy ===
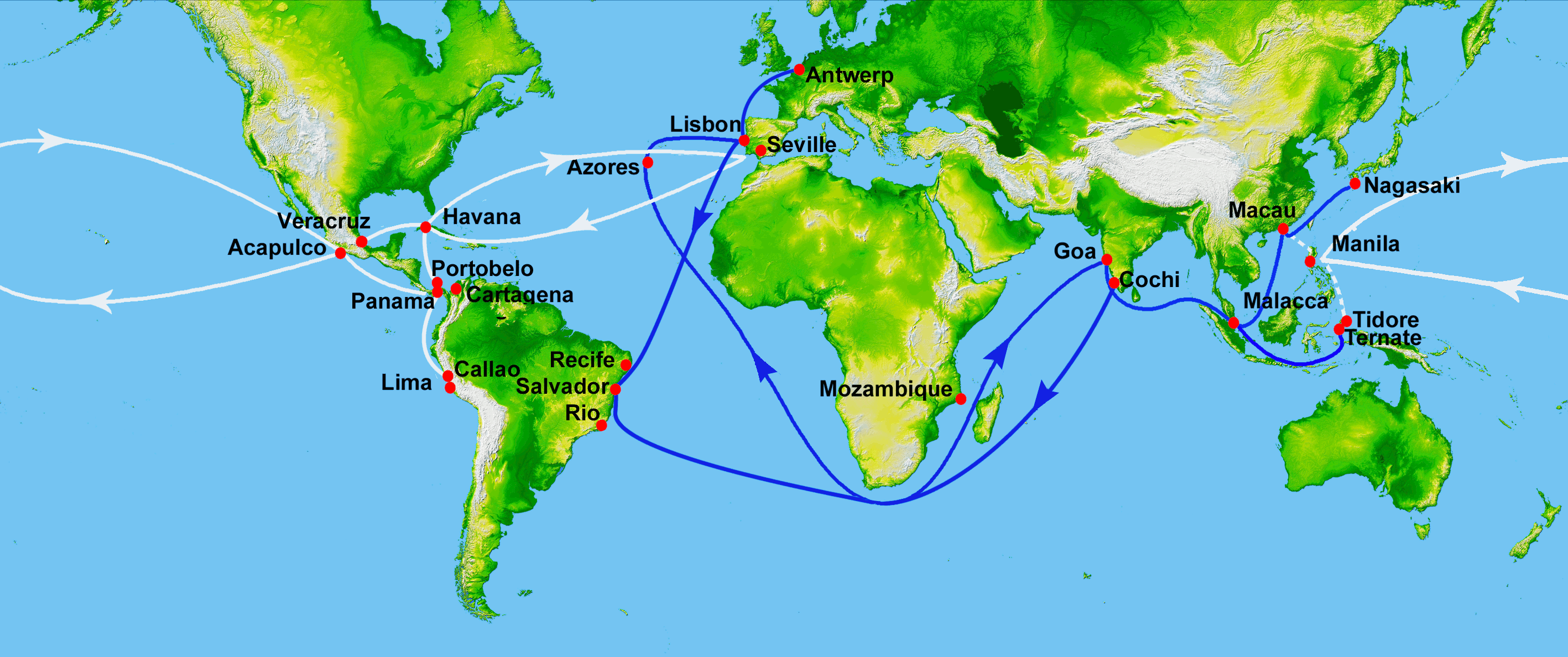
The Manila-Acapulco trade route started in 1568 and Spanish treasure fleets (white) and its eastwards rivals, the Portuguese India Armadas routes of 1498–1640 (blue)

The decline of Galleon trade between Manila and Acapulco was caused by the arrival of the ship Buen Consejo in 1765. The Buen Consejo took the shorter route via Cape of Good Hope, a rocky headland on the Atlantic coast controlled by Portugal. The journey through the Cape of Good Hope takes three months from Spain to the Philippines, whereas the journey of the galleon trade takes five months. The event proved that Portugal was already past its prime in controlling the route via the Cape of Good Hope, which was already under Dutch control as early as 1652. Shorter journeys to and from Spain brought faster trade and quicker spread of ideas from Europe. Also, the growing sense of economic insecurity in the later years of the 18th century led the Creoles to turn their attention to agricultural production. The Creoles gradually changed from a very government-dependent class into capital-driven entrepreneurs. Their turning of attention towards guilded soil caused the rise of the large private haciendas. Various government and church positions were transferred to the roles of the Peninsulares who were characterized mostly in the 19th century Philippine history as corrupt bureaucrats.

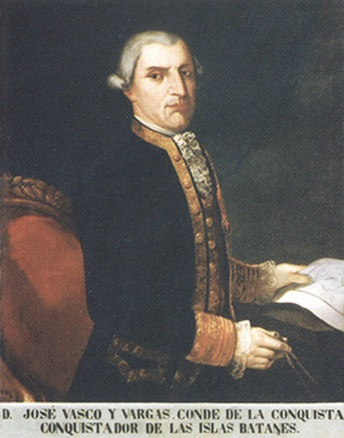
Jose Basco, the 44th governor-general of the Philippines under Spanish colonial rule

During the 1780s, two institutions were established in order to enhance the economic capacity of the Philippines. These were the Economic Societies of Friends of the Country and the Royal Company of the Philippines. The former, introduced by Governor-General Jose Basco in 1780, was composed of leading men in business, industry and profession, the society was tasked to explore and exploit the natural resources of the archipelago. It offered local and foreign scholarships, besides training grants in agriculture and established an academy of design. It was also credited to the carabao ban of 1782, the formation of the silversmiths and gold beaters guild and the construction of the first papermill in the Philippines in 1825. The latter, created by Carlos III on March 10, 1785, was granted exclusive monopoly of bringing to Manila; Chinese and Indian goods and shipping them directly to Spain via the Cape of Good Hope. It was stiffly objected by the Dutch and English who saw it as a direct attack on their trade of Asian goods. It was also vehemently opposed by the traders of the Galleon trade who saw it as competition.

=== Education ===
During the administration of Governor-General Jose Raon, a royal order from Spain, which stated that every village or barrio must have a school and a teacher, was implemented. The implementation of the order expanded the reach of basic education during the Spanish era. Also, during the 18th century, modern agricultural tools made many people leave farming for pursuing academic and intellectual courses. After the arrival of Buen Consejo, the Philippines had more direct contact to Europe and the ideas circulating. Thus, the Philippines was influenced by the principles during the Age of Enlightenment and radical changes during the French Revolution.

=== Secularization of parishes ===
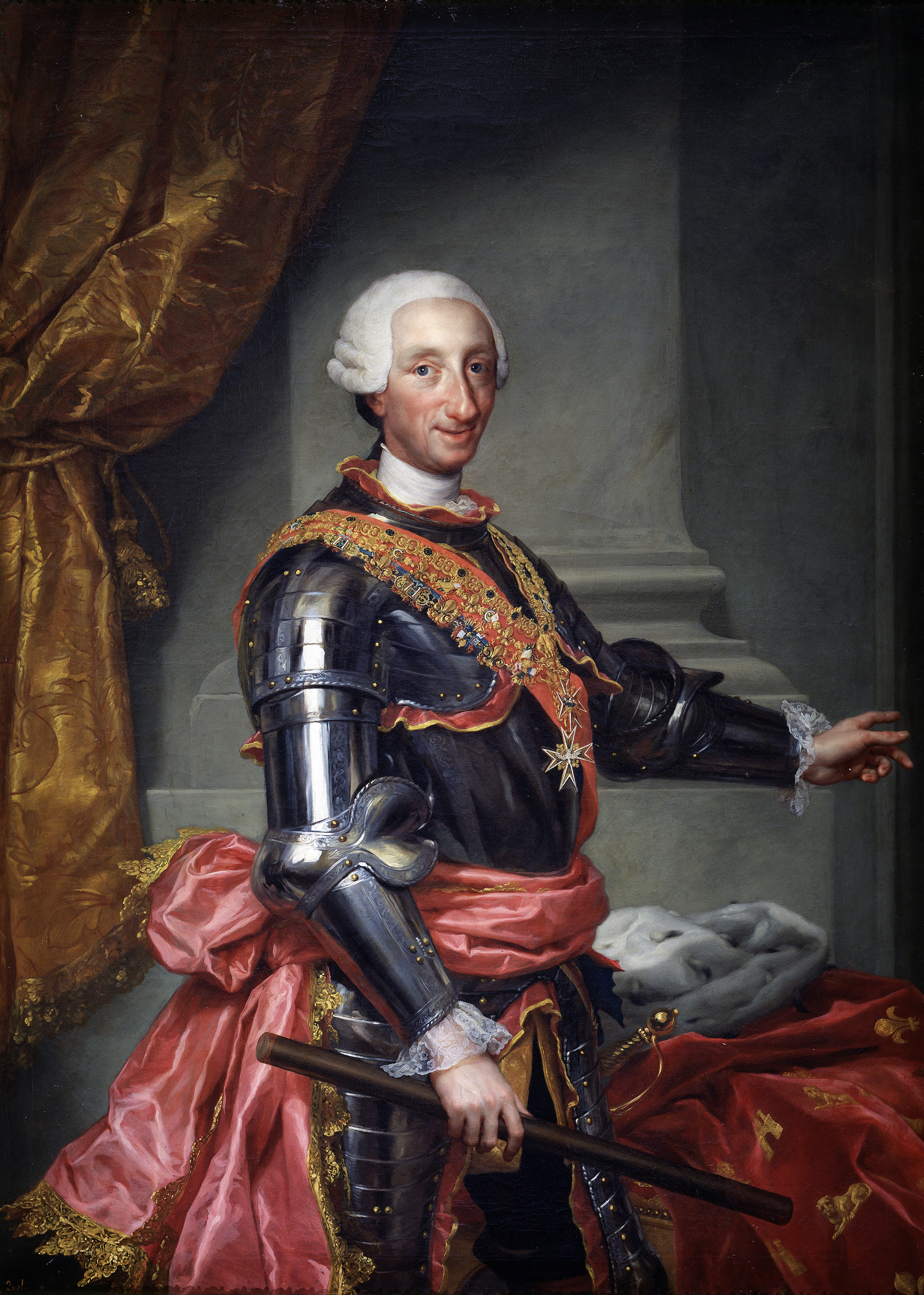
Portrait of Charles III of Spain, 1761

By royal decree on February 27, 1767, King Carlos III ordered the Jesuits to be expelled from Spain, and from all her colonies. The decree reached the Philippines in early 1768, wherein Governor-General Raon tried to do the Jesuits a favor by delaying the implementation of the royal order in exchange of bribes. This gave the Jesuit priests to hide all of their possessions and destroy documents that could be held against them, which were supposed to be confiscated. The first batch of Jesuits, numbered 64, left Manila only by May 17, 1768. This event caused Raon to face prosecution from the next governor-general, as ordered by the king of Spain. Raon died before the judgment for him was laid.

The expulsion of Jesuit priests from the country resulted to a shortage of priests in the parishes. This prompted the current Manila archbishop, Basilio Sancho de Santa Justa, to launch his favorite project: secularization of Philippine parishes. Sancho reasoned out that priests were only sent to facilitate missions to areas that are not yet much Christianized. Native priests must be ordained to facilitate the parishes since the Philippines was already a Christian country. Sancho recruited every Indio he got to become priests. There was even a joke at the time that there were no one to man the galleons anymore, since Sancho had made them all priests. The secularization partly failed because many members of the newly formed native clergy soiled the parishes with their ignorance, sloth, and the like. One achievement of Sancho's secularization project was the establishment of a school for native boys who aspire to become priests.

== The start of Filipino nationalism (1760s–1820s) ==
The term "Filipino" originally referred to the Spanish criollos of the Philippines. During their 333-year rule of the Philippines, the Spanish rulers referred the natives as indios.

Also during the colonial era, the Spaniards born in the Philippines, who were more known as insulares, criollos, or Creoles, were also called "Filipinos." Spanish-born Spaniards or mainland Spaniards residing in the Philippines were referred to as Peninsulares. Those of mixed ancestry were referred to as Mestizos. The Creoles, despite being regarded by the Peninsulares as inferior to them, had enjoyed various government and church positions, and composed the majority of the government bureaucracy. The sense of national consciousness came from the Creoles, who now regard themselves as "Filipino". It was brought to its advent by three major factors: 1) economy, 2) education and 3) secularization of parishes. These factors contributed to the birth of the Filipino Nationalism. The opening of the Philippines to the international or world trade, the rise of the middle class, and the influx of Liberal ideas from Europe were only a few examples of how the Philippines developed into a stable country. "The first manifestation of Philippine nationalism followed in the decades of the 1880s and the 1890s, with a reform or propaganda movement, conducted both in Spain and in the Philippines, for the purpose of "propagandizing" Philippine conditions in the hopes that desired changes in the social, political and economic life of the Filipinos would come about through peaceful means."

Effect of the progress during the period (1760s–1820s)

The earliest signs of the effect to Filipino Nationalism by the developments mentioned could be seen in the writings of Luis Rodríguez Varela, a Creole educated in liberal France and highly exposed to the Age of Enlightenment. Knighted under the Order of Carlos III, Varela was perhaps the only Philippine Creole who was actually part of European nobility. The court gazette in Madrid announced that he was to become a Conde and from that point on proudly called himself El Conde Filipino. He championed the rights of Filipinos in the islands and slowly made the term applicable to anyone born in the Philippines.

Further progress of Filipino nationalism (1820s–1860)

At this stage, the Creoles slowly introduced their own reforms. Parishes began to have native priests at the time of Archbishop Sancho. The Philippines was given representation in the Spanish Cortes three times (last time was from 1836 to 1837). However, on June 1, 1823, a Creole revolt broke out in Manila led by the Mexican-blood Creole captain Andres Novales. The revolt, caused by an order from Spain that declared military officers commissioned in the Peninsula (Spain) should outrank all those appointed in the Colonies, saw Manila cheering with Novales's cry of "Viva la Independencia" (English: Long Live Independence). The revolt prompted the government to deport Varela together with other Creoles [allegedly known as Los Hijos del País (English: The Children of the Country)], after being associated with the Creole reformists. The Novales Revolt would soon be followed by another Creole plot of secession known as the Palmero Conspiracy, which was caused by the replacement of Creole public officials, especially provincial governors, with Peninsulars.

Economic developments also did a part in making up the shape of Filipino nationalism. Before the opening of Manila to foreign trade, the Spanish authorities discouraged foreign merchants from residing in the colony and engaging in business. In 1823, Governor-General Mariano Ricafort promulgated an edict prohibiting foreign merchants from engaging in retail trade and visiting the provinces for purposes of trade. However, by the royal decree of September 6, 1834, the privileges of the company were abolished and the port of Manila was opened to trade.

Shortly after opening Manila to world trade, the Spanish merchants began to lose their commercial supremacy in the Philippines. In 1834, restrictions against foreign traders were relaxed when Manila became an open port. By the end of 1859, there were 15 foreign firms in Manila: seven of which were British, three American, two French, two Swiss, and one German. In response to Sinibaldo de Mas' recommendations, more ports were opened by Spain to world trade. The ports of Sual, Pangasinan, Iloilo, and Zamboanga were opened in 1855. Cebu was opened in 1860, Legazpi and Tacloban in 1873. Like Japan that rushed into modernization and national transformation during the Meiji Restoration, the Philippines and its people saw that the Spanish and its government is not as invincible as it was two centuries before. The Indios and the Creoles became more influenced by foreign ideas of liberalism as the Philippines became more open to foreigners. Foreigners who visited the Philippines had noticed the speed of the circulation of the ideas of Voltaire and Thomas Paine. Songs about liberty and equality were also being sung at the time. Some Spanish who foresaw a "fast verging" Indio takeover of the archipelago began to send money out of the Philippines.

== First Propaganda Movement (1860–1872) ==
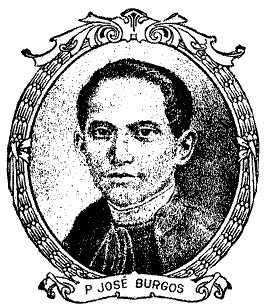
Padre José Apolonio Burgos

Varela would then retire from politics but his nationalism was carried on by another Creole, one Pedro Peláez, who campaigned for the rights of Filipino priests (Creoles, Mestizos and Indios) and pressed for secularization of Philippine parishes. He reasoned out the same point Sancho had, friars are for missions on areas that are still pagan. The Latin American revolutions and decline of friar influence in Spain resulted in the increase of the regular clergy (Peninsular friars) in the Philippines. Filipino priests (Creoles, Mestizos and Indios) were being replaced by Spanish friars (Peninsulares) and Peláez demanded explanation as to the legality of replacing a secular with regulars—which is in contradiction to the Exponi nobis. Peláez brought the case to the Vatican and almost succeeded if not for an earthquake that cut his career short. The earthquake struck on June 3, 1863, during the feast of Corpus Christi. The ideology would be carried by his more militant disciple, José Burgos.

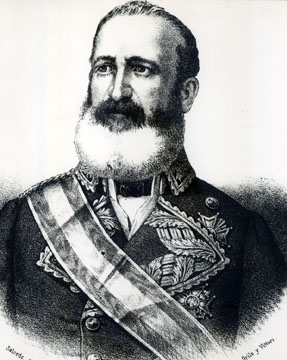
Carlos María de la Torre y Nava Cerrada, the 91st Governor-General of the Philippines

Demonstrations became a norm in Manila during the 1860s. One of the first of a series of demonstrations was during the transfer of the remains of former governor-general Simón de Anda y Salazar from the Manila Cathedral after the 1863 earthquake. Anda was a hero for the natives because he fought friar power during his term, and he established a separate government in Bacolor during the British occupation of Manila. On the day of the transfer, a young Indio priest approached the coffin and laid a laurel wreath dedicated by "The Secular Clergy of the Philippines" to Don Simón de Anda. Then, a young Indio student went to the coffin and offered a crown of flowers. Lastly, a number of gobernadorcillos went to do their own salutations for Don Simón de Anda. Since none of those acts were in the program, the Spanish saw that it was a secretly planned demonstration. Though no one told who the mastermind was, there were rumors that it was Padre Burgos. The demonstrations got more frequent and more influential during the liberal regime of Governor-General Carlos María de la Torre (1869–1871). Only two weeks after the arrival of de la Torre as Governor-General, Burgos and Joaquin Pardo de Tavera led a demonstration at the Plaza de Santa Potenciana. Among the demonstrators were Jose Icaza, Jaime Baldovino Gorospe, Jacobo Zobel, Ignacio Rocha, Manuel Genato and Maximo Paterno. The demo cry was "Viva Filipinas para los Filipinos!". In November 1870, a student movement, denounced as a riot or motin, at the University of Santo Tomas formed a committee to demand reforms on the school and its curricula. It later announced support of Philippine autonomy and recognition of the Philippines as a province of Spain. The committee was headed by Felipe Buencamino. During this period, a secret society of reformists met in a cistern under a well at the house of Father Mariano Gomez. The society, headed by Jose Maria Basa, worked mainly on a Madrid journal called the Eco de Filipinas (not to be confused with the El Eco de Filipinas that was published much later, in September 1890). The journal exposed problems in the Philippines and pressed on reforms that they seek for the country. Among the members were Burgos, Maximo Paterno, Ambrosio Rianzares Bautista, and Father Agustin Mendoza. It served as a precursor to La Solidaridad. However, Burgos died after the infamous Cavite Mutiny, which was pinned on Burgos as his attempt to start a Creole Revolution and make himself president of the Philippines or Rey Indio. The death of José Burgos, and the other alleged conspirators, Mariano Gomez and Jacinto Zamora on February 17, 1872, seemingly ended the entire Creole movement. Governor-General Rafael de Izquierdo y Gutiérrez unleashed his reign of terror in order to prevent the spread of the Creole ideology—Filipino nationalism.

Another event in history created an impact on Filipino nationalism during this period. Before 1869, the route through the Cape of Good Hope proved to be a shortest available journey to Europe by Indios and Creoles alike. The journey takes 3 months travel by sea. On November 17, 1869, the Suez Canal opened after 10 years of construction work. At its advent, the journey from the Philippines to Spain was further reduced to one month. This allowed a much faster spread of European ideology and an increase of Filipino presence in Europe itself. The Propaganda Movement would later benefit from the Suez Canal for the shorter route it provided.

== Second Propaganda Movement (1872–1892) ==
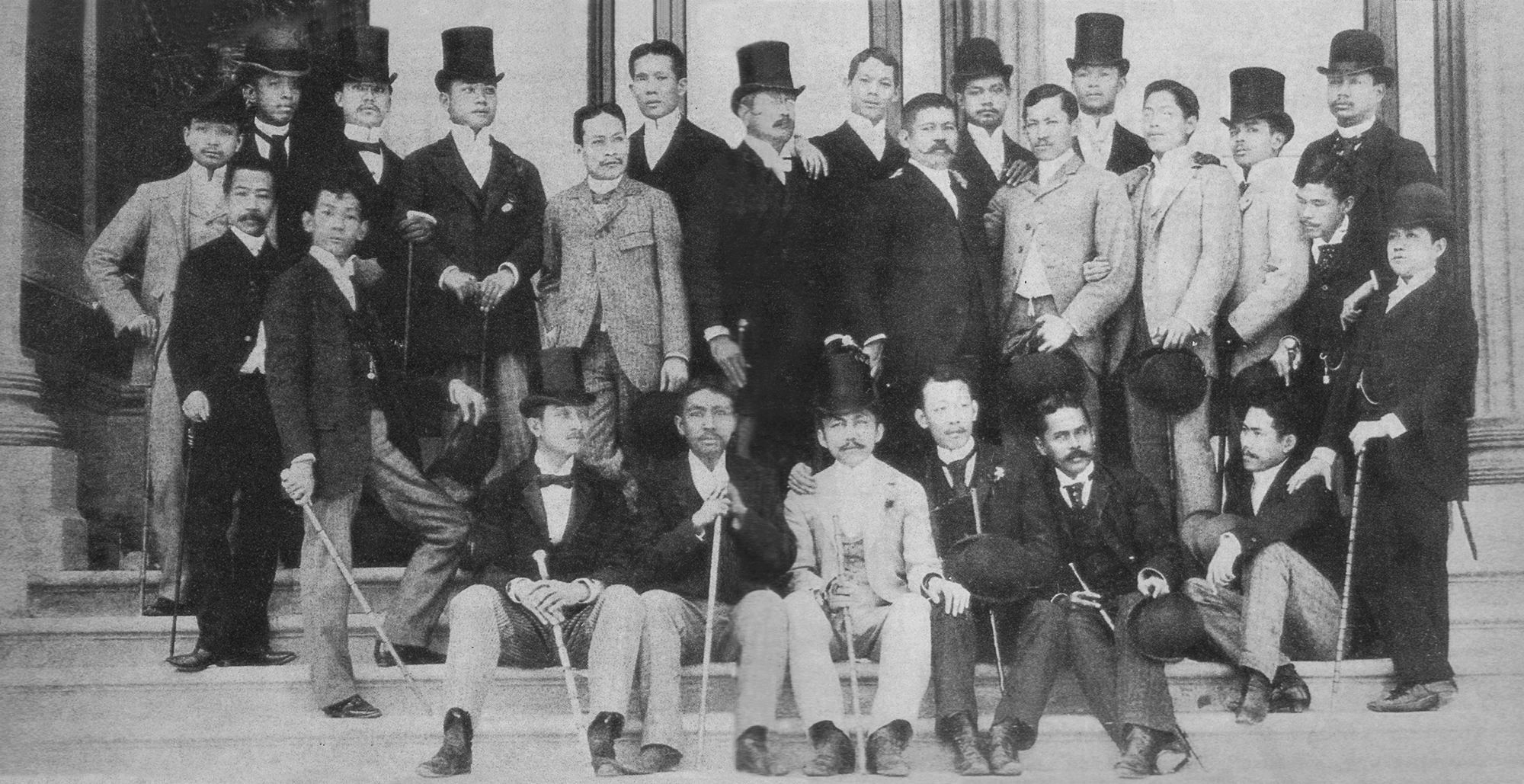
Filipino expatriates in Europe formed the Propaganda Movement. Photographed in Madrid, Spain in 1890.

The events of 1872 however invited the other colored section of the Ilustrados (intellectually enlightened class), the growing middle-class natives, to at least do something to preserve the Creole ideals. Seeing the impossibility of a revolution against Izquierdo and the governor-general's brutal reign convinced the Ilustrados to get out of the Philippines and continue propaganda in Europe. This massive propaganda upheaval from 1872 to 1892 is now known as the Second Propaganda Movement. Through their writings and orations, Marcelo H. del Pilar, Graciano López Jaena and José Rizal sounded the trumpets of Filipino nationalism and brought it to the level of the masses. The propagandists mainly aimed for representation of the Philippines in the Cortes Generales, secularization of the clergy, legalization of Spanish and Filipino equality, among others. Their main work was the newspaper called La Solidaridad (Solidarity), which was first published at Barcelona on December 13, 1888. Rizal, the foremost figure of the propagandists, created the Noli Me Tángere (published 1887) and El filibusterismo (published 1891). It rode the increasing anti-Spanish (anti-Peninsulares) sentiments in the islands and pushed the people towards revolution, rather than discourage them that a revolution was not the solution for independence.

The Filipino identity that emerged was based around the idea of unity among the lowland Catholic population that was integrated into the Spanish system, not yet encompassing the Moros in the south and the tribal people who lived in the mountainous interior.

== Post-propaganda era ==
By July 1892, Rizal returned to the Philippines and established a progressive organization he called the La Liga Filipina (The Philippine League). However, the organization collapsed after Rizal's arrest and deportation to Dapitan on July 7. At the same day, a Philippine revolutionary society was founded by Ilustrados led by Andrés Bonifacio, Deodato Arellano, Ladislao Diwa, Teodoro Plata, and Valentín Díaz. The main aim of the organization, named Katipunan, was to win Philippine independence through a revolution and establish a republic thereafter. The rise of the Katipunan signaled the end of peaceful propaganda for reforms.

=== Philippine Revolution ===
Original flag of the Philippines, as conceived by Emilio Aguinaldo.

The Katipunan reached an overwhelming membership and attracted almost the lowly of the Filipino class. In June 1896, Bonifacio sent an emissary to Dapitan to reach Rizal's support, but the latter refused for an armed revolution. On August 19, 1896, Katipunan was discovered by a Spanish friar which started the Philippine Revolution.

The revolution flared up initially into the eight provinces of Central Luzon. General Emilio Aguinaldo, a member of the Katipunan, spread an armed resistance through Southern Tagalog region where he liberated Cavite towns little by little. Leadership conflicts between Bonifacio and Aguinaldo culminated in the Imus Assembly in December 1896 and Tejeros Convention in March 1897. Aguinaldo was elected in absentia as President of an insurgent revolutionary government by the Tejeros convention. Bonifacio, acting as Supremo of the Katipunan, declared the convention proceedings void and attempted to reassert leadership of the revolution. In late April Aguinaldo fully assumed presidential office after consolidating his position with revolutionary leaders. Aguinaldo's government then ordered the arrest of Bonifacio, who stood trial on charges of sedition and treason against Aguinaldo's government and conspiracy to murder Aguinaldo. Bonifacio was convicted in a rigged trial by a kangaroo court composed of Aguinaldo loyalists. Bonifacio was subsequently executed.

In December 1897, Aguinaldo agreed to the Pact of Biak-na-Bato with the Spanish colonial government. Aguinaldo and his revolutionary leadership were exiled to Hong Kong. However, not all of the revolutionary generals complied with the agreement. One, General Francisco Makabulos, established a Central Executive Committee to serve as the interim government until a more suitable one was created.

=== Independence declaration and the Philippine-American War ===
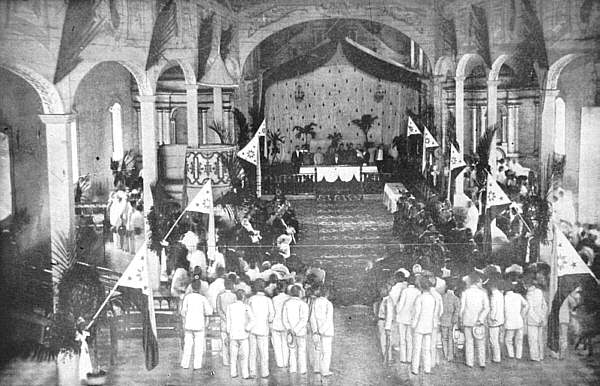
Revolutionaries gather during the Malolos Congress of the First Philippine Republic.

In 1898, as conflicts continued in the Philippines, the USS Maine, having been sent to Cuba because of US concerns for the safety of its citizens during an ongoing Cuban revolution, exploded and sank in Havana harbor. This event precipitated the Spanish–American War. After Commodore George Dewey defeated the Spanish squadron at Manila, a German squadron, led by Vice Admiral Otto von Diederichs, arrived in Manila and engaged in maneuvers which Dewey, seeing this as obstruction of his blockade, offered war—after which the Germans backed down.

The US invited Aguinaldo to return to the Philippines in the hope he would rally Filipinos against the Spanish colonial government. Aguinaldo arrived on May 19, 1898, via transport provided by Dewey. By the time US land forces had arrived, the Filipinos had taken control of the entire island of Luzon, except for the walled city of Intramuros. On June 12, 1898, Aguinaldo declared the independence of the Philippines in Kawit, Cavite, establishing the First Philippine Republic under Asia's first democratic constitution, the Malolos Constitution, an insurgency against Spanish rule.

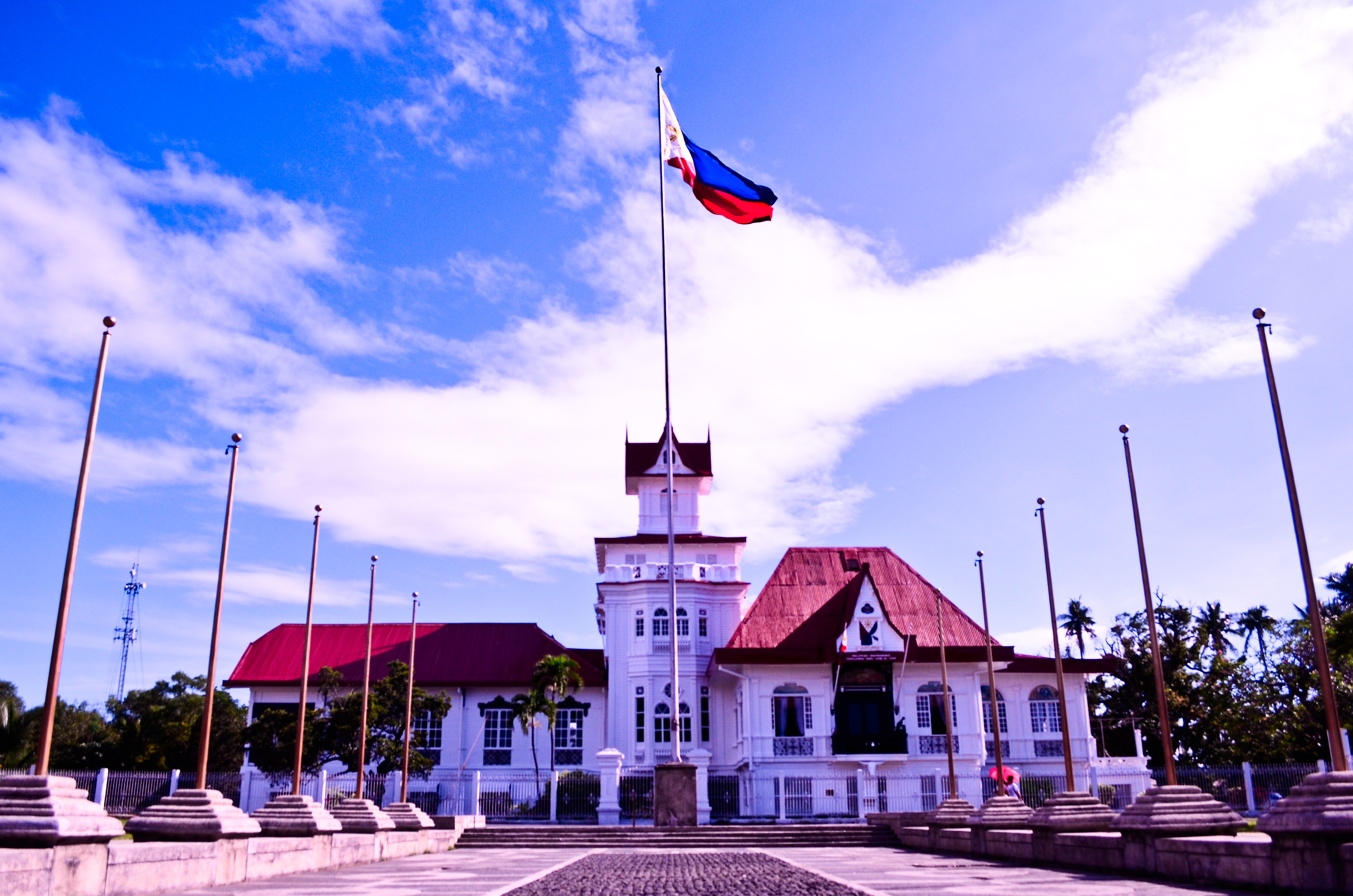
The Aguinaldo Shrine built in 1845 is where Philippine independence from Spain was declared on June 12, 1898.

Spain and the United States sent commissioners to Paris to draw up the terms of the Treaty of Paris which ended the Spanish–American War. In the treaty, Spain ceded the Philippines, along with Guam and Puerto Rico, to the United States. Cession of the Philippines involved payment by the US of US$20,000,000.00. US President McKinley described the acquisition of the Philippines as "... a gift from the gods", saying that since "they were unfit for self-government, ... there was nothing left for us to do but to take them all, and to educate the Filipinos, and uplift and civilize and Christianize them", in spite of the Philippines having been already Christianized by the Spanish over the course of several centuries.

Filipino forces under Aguinaldo as President of the insurgent Philippine Republic resisted the US occupation, resulting in the Philippine–American War (1899–1913). The poorly-equipped Filipino troops were easily overpowered by American troops in open combat, but they were formidable opponents in guerrilla warfare. Malolos, the revolutionary capital, was captured on March 31, 1899. Aguinaldo and his government escaped however, establishing a new capital at San Isidro, Nueva Ecija. On June 5, 1899, Antonio Luna, Aguinaldo's most capable military commander, was killed by Aguinaldo's guards in an apparent assassination while visiting Cabanatuan, Nueva Ecija to meet with Aguinaldo. Aguinaldo dissolved the regular army on November 13 and ordered the establishment of decentralized guerrilla commands in each of several military zones. Another key general, Gregorio del Pilar, was killed on December 2, 1899, in the Battle of Tirad Pass—a rear guard action to delay the Americans while Aguinaldo made good his escape through the mountains.

Aguinaldo was captured at Palanan, Isabela on March 23, 1901, and was brought to Manila. Convinced of the futility of further resistance, he swore allegiance to the United States and issued a proclamation calling on his compatriots to lay down their arms, officially bringing an end to the war. However, sporadic insurgent resistance to American rule continued in various parts of the Philippines, notably insurgencies such as the Irreconcilables and the Moro Rebellion, until 1913.

== The Insular Government and the Commonwealth era (1901–1946) ==
=== Insular Government ===
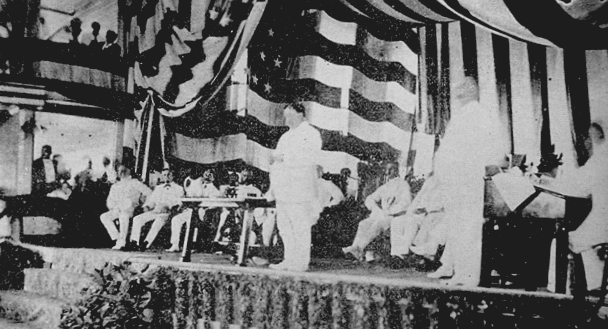
William Howard Taft addressing the audience at the First Philippine Assembly in the Manila Grand Opera House

The 1902 Philippine Organic Act was a constitution for the Insular Government, as the US civil administration was known. This was a form of territorial government that reported to the Bureau of Insular Affairs. The act provided for a governor general appointed by the US president and an elected lower house. It also disestablished the Catholic Church as the state religion.

Two years after completion and publication of a census, a general election was conducted for the choice of delegates to a popular assembly. An elected Philippine Assembly was convened in 1907 as the lower house of a bicameral legislature, with the Philippine Commission as the upper house. Every year from 1907 the Philippine Assembly and later the Philippine Legislature passed resolutions expressing the Filipino desire for independence.

Philippine nationalists led by Manuel L. Quezon and Sergio Osmeña enthusiastically endorsed the draft Jones Bill of 1912, which provided for Philippine independence after eight years, but later changed their views, opting for a bill which focused less on time than on the conditions of independence. The nationalists demanded complete and absolute independence but neither Quezon nor Osmeña favored immediacy. Since the US feared that too-rapid independence from American rule without such guarantees might cause the Philippines to fall into Japanese hands. The Jones bill was rewritten and passed Congress in 1916 with a later date of independence.

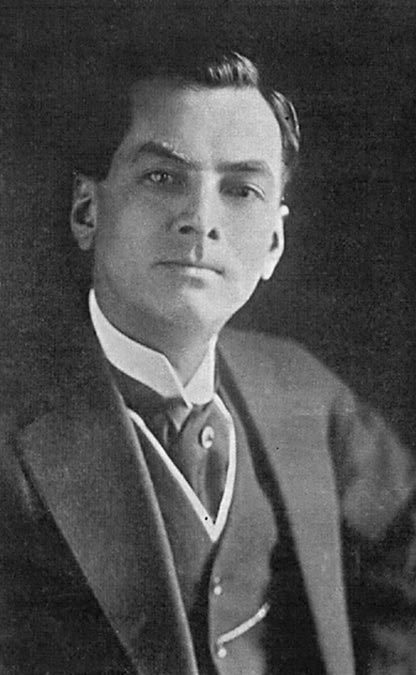
Manuel L. Quezon was the leading figure of Philippine nationalism during the American period. He would later became the president of the Philippines.

The law, officially the Philippine Autonomy Act but popularly known as the Jones Law, served as the new organic act (or constitution) for the Philippines. Its preamble stated that the eventual independence of the Philippines would be American policy, subject to the establishment of a stable government. The law maintained the governor-general of the Philippines, appointed by the president of the United States, but established a bicameral Philippine Legislature to replace the elected Philippine Assembly (lower house); it replaced the appointive Philippine Commission (upper house) with an elected senate.

The Filipinos suspended their independence campaign during the First World War and supported the United States against Germany. After the war they resumed their independence efforts. The Philippine legislature funded an independence mission to the US in 1919. The mission departed Manila on February 28 and met in the US with and presented their case to Secretary of War Newton D. Baker. US president Woodrow Wilson, in his 1921 farewell message to Congress, certified that the Filipino people had performed the condition imposed on them as a prerequisite to independence, declaring that, this having been done, the duty of the US is to grant Philippine independence.

After the first independence mission, public funding of such missions was ruled illegal. Subsequent independence missions in 1922, 1923, 1930, 1931 1932, and two missions in 1933 were funded by voluntary contributions. Numerous independence bills were submitted to the US Congress, which passed the Hare–Hawes–Cutting Bill on December 30, 1932. US president Herbert Hoover vetoed the bill on January 13, 1933. Congress overrode the veto on January 17, and the Hare–Hawes–Cutting Act became US law. The law promised Philippine independence after 10 years, but reserved several military and naval bases for the United States, as well as imposing tariffs and quotas on Philippine exports. The law also required the Philippine Senate to ratify the law. Quezon urged the Philippine Senate to reject the bill, which it did. Quezon himself led the twelfth independence mission to Washington to secure a better independence act. The result was the Tydings–McDuffie Act of 1934 which was very similar to the Hare–Hawes–Cutting Act except in minor details. The Tydings–McDuffie Act was ratified by the Philippine Senate. The law provided for the granting of Philippine independence by 1946.

=== Commonwealth era ===
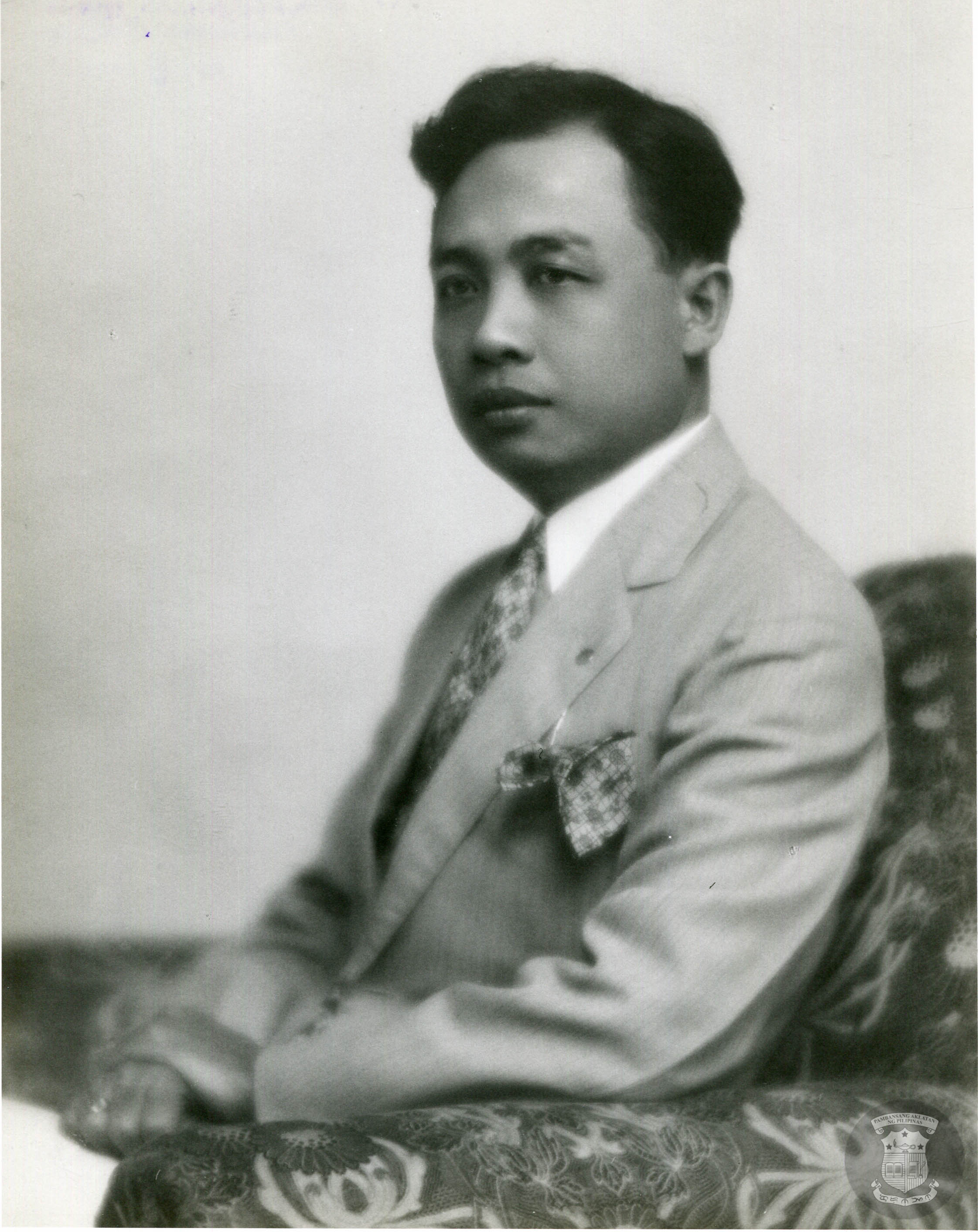
Nationalist figure Claro M. Recto

The Tydings-McDuffie Act provided for the drafting and guidelines of a Constitution, for a 10-year "transitional period" as the Commonwealth of the Philippines before the granting of Philippine independence. On May 5, 1934, the Philippines legislature passed an act setting the election of convention delegates. Governor General Frank Murphy designated July 10 as the election date, and the convention held its inaugural session on July 30. The completed draft constitution was approved by the convention on February 8, 1935, approved by US president Franklin Roosevelt on March 23, and ratified by popular vote on May 14.

On September 17, 1935, presidential elections were held. Candidates included former president Emilio Aguinaldo, the Iglesia Filipina Independiente leader Gregorio Aglipay, and others. Manuel L. Quezon and Sergio Osmeña of the Nacionalista Party were proclaimed the winners, winning the seats of president and vice-president, respectively. The Commonwealth Government was inaugurated on the morning of November 15, 1935, in ceremonies held on the steps of the Legislative Building in Manila. The event was attended by a crowd of around 300,000 people.

== Japanese occupation and the Second Republic (1941–1945) ==
Japan launched a surprise attack on the Clark Air Base in Pampanga on December 8, 1941, just ten hours after the attack on Pearl Harbor. Aerial bombardment, which destroyed most of the American aircraft in the islands, was followed by landings of ground troops on Luzon. The defending Philippine and United States troops were under the command of General Douglas MacArthur. Under the pressure of superior numbers, the defending forces withdrew to the Bataan Peninsula and to the island of Corregidor at the entrance to Manila Bay. On January 2, 1942, General MacArthur declared the capital city, Manila, an open city to prevent its destruction. The Philippine defense continued until the final surrender of United States-Philippine forces on the Bataan Peninsula in April 1942 and on Corregidor in May of the same year.

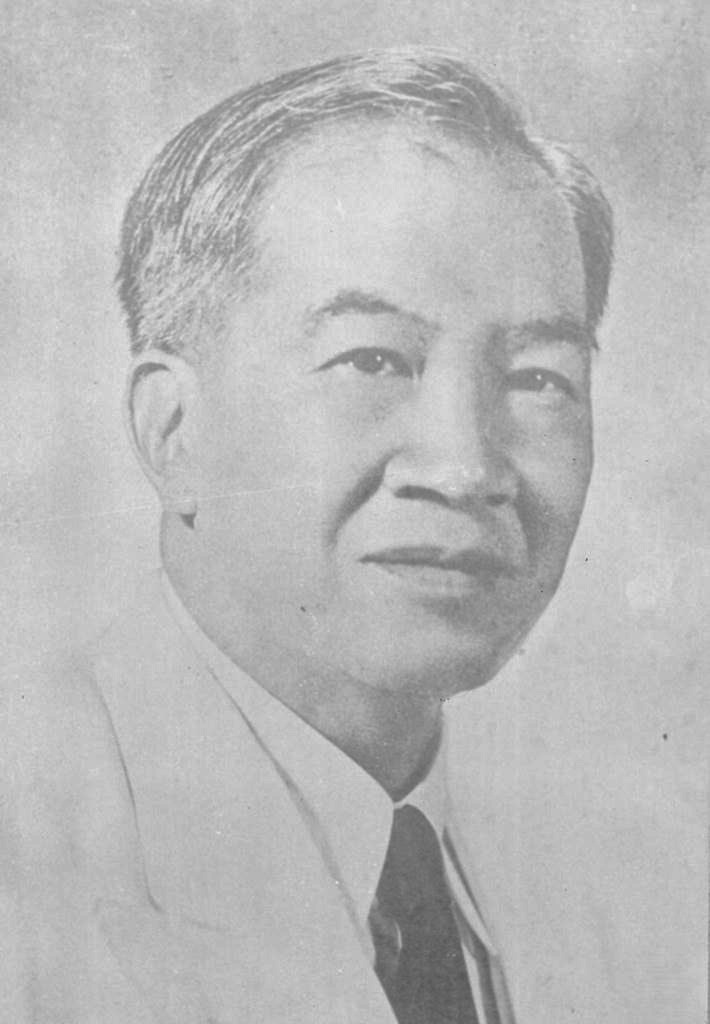
José P. Laurel was the only president of the Second Philippine Republic.

The Philippine Executive Commission was established in 1942 with Jorge B. Vargas as its first chairman. The PEC was created as the temporary care-taker government of the Greater Manila area and eventually of the whole Philippines during the Japanese occupation of the country during World War II. On May 6, 1943, Japanese premier Hideki Tojo during a visit to the Philippines pledged to establish the Republic of the Philippines. This pledge of Tojo prompted the "KALIBAPI," to call for a convention on June 19, 1943, and twenty of its members were elected to form the Preparatory Commission for Independence. The commission tasked to draft a constitution for the Philippine Republic and elected head was José P. Laurel. The Preparatory Commission presented its draft Constitution on September 4, 1943, and three days later, the "KALIBAPI" general assembly ratified the draft Constitution.

The Japanese-sponsored establishment of the Republic of the Philippines was proclaimed on October 14, 1943, with José P. Laurel being sworn in as president. On the same day, a "Pact of Alliance" was signed between the new Philippine Republic and the Japanese government that was ratified two days later by the National Assembly. The Philippine Republic was immediately recognized by Japan, and in the succeeding days by Germany, Thailand, Manchukuo, Burma, Croatia, and Italy while neutral Spain sent its "greetings".

In October 1944, General Douglas MacArthur, the overall commander of American forces in the Pacific, had gathered enough additional troops and supplies to begin the retaking of the Philippines, landing with Sergio Osmeña who had assumed the Presidency after Quezon's death. The battles entailed long fierce fighting; some of the Japanese continued to fight until the official surrender of the Empire of Japan on September 2, 1945. The Second Republic was dissolved earlier, on August 14. After their landing, Filipino and American forces also undertook measures to suppress the Huk movement, which was founded to fight the Japanese Occupation.

== Third Republic (1946–1972) ==
Proclamation of independence

Carlos, America buried imperialism here today!

– General Douglas MacArthur to Carlos Romulo at the recognition of the independence of the Philippines.

On July 4, 1946, representatives of the United States of America and of the Republic of the Philippines signed a Treaty of General Relations between the two governments. The treaty provided for the recognition of the independence of the Republic of the Philippines as of July 4, 1946, and the relinquishment of American sovereignty over the Philippine Islands.

From 1946 to 1961, the Philippines observed Independence Day on July 4. However, on May 12, 1962, President Diosdado Macapagal issued Presidential Proclamation No. 28 proclaiming June 12, 1962, as a special public holiday throughout the Philippines. In 1964, Republic Act No. 4166 changed the date of Independence Day from July 4 to June 12 and renamed the July 4 holiday as Philippine Republic Day.

But in the hearts of eighteen million Filipinos, the American flag now flies more triumphantly than ever.

– President Manuel Roxas addressing the crowd after the flag-raising ceremony on July 4, 1946

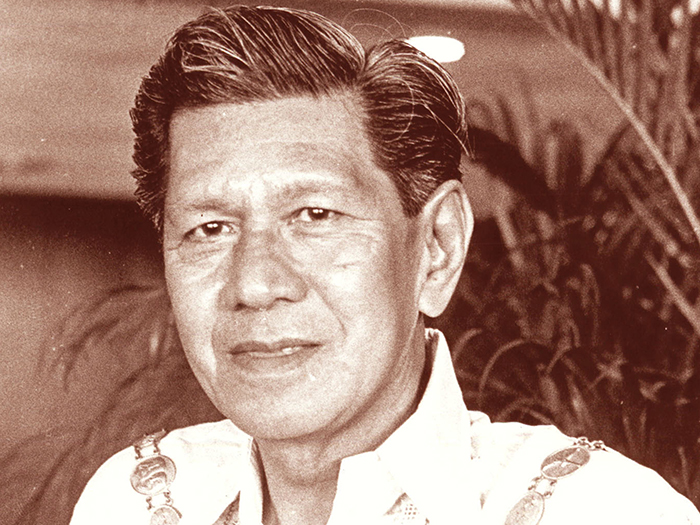
Nationalist writer Nick Joaquin

Despite eventual success of Filipinos to claim political and social independence, a new type of colonialism rose in the country. It is known as neocolonialism. Neocolonialism is defined as the practice of using economic, linguistic, and cultural forces to control a country (usually former European colonies in Africa or Asia) in lieu of direct military or political control. Since most of the country was ravaged by the Second World War, the Philippines depended mainly on the United States to restore her industries and businesses. The country only began to build local industries to reduce economic dependence on foreign nations during the term of President Ferdinand Marcos. Nationalism in the real sense remained stuck up in a false Filipinistic posture. Examples of governmental efforts to enforce nationalistic policies began with former president Ramon Magsaysay sworn into office wearing the barong tagalog, a first by any Philippine president. It was fervently followed by the nationalist program "Filipino First Policy" of Carlos P. Garcia.

=== Radical nationalism ===
After World War II, the Hukbalahap (Filipino: Hukbong Bayan Laban sa mga Hapon) guerillas continued the revolutionary struggle to establish a Communist government in the Philippines. Nationalism in the real sense remained stuck up in a false Filipinistic posture. The radical wing of the nationalists, led by peasant leader Luis Taruc, renamed themselves as the Hukbong Magpalaya ng Bayan (English: Army to Liberate the People). At its heyday, the Huk movement commanded an estimated 170,000 armed troops with a base of at least two million civilian supporters. Ramon Magsaysay, which was then the Secretary of National Defense during the Quirino administration, was instrumental in halting the Communist movement.

In 1964, Jose Maria Sison co-founded the Kabataang Makabayan (Patriotic Youth) with Nilo S. Tayag. This organization rallied the Filipino youth against the Vietnam War, against the Marcos presidency, and corrupt politicians. On December 26, 1968, he formed and chaired the Central Committee of the Communist Party of the Philippines (CPP), an organization within the Communist Party founded on Marxist–Leninist-Mao Zedong Thought, stemming from his own experiences as a youth leader and a labor and land reform activist. This is known as the "First Great Rectification" movement where Sison and other radical youths criticized the existing Party's leadership and failure. The reformed CPP included Maoism within the political line as well as the struggle for a National Democratic Revolution in two-stages, consisting of a protracted people's war as its first part to be followed by a socialist revolution.

Radical nationalism in the Philippines emphasized the Philippine Revolution under Bonifacio as unfinished and henceforth continued, under working class leadership. Writers such as Teodoro Agoncillo and Renato Constantino advocated patriotism by means of revisiting Filipino history in a Filipino perspective.

== Martial law and the Fourth Republic (1972–1986) ==
=== Martial law under Ferdinand Marcos ===
The Third Philippine Republic established in 1946 after World War II ended with the declaration of Martial law under Ferdinand Marcos shortly before what was supposed to be the end of his last allowable term under the 1935 Constitution of the Philippines.

On September 22, 1972, then-Defense Minister Juan Ponce Enrile was reportedly ambushed by communists in San Juan, killing his driver but leaving him unscathed. The Enrile ambush was widely believed to have been faked. The assassination attempt, the growing threat of the New People's Army, and citizen unrest, were used by Marcos as justification to declare Proclamation No. 1081, which he signed on September 17 (postdated to September 21), the same day.

Ruling by decree, Marcos suspended the privilege of the writ of habeas corpus and dissolved other civil liberties such as freedom of the press, padlocked Congress and universities, and arrested student activists and opposition leaders, including senators Benigno Aquino Jr. and Jose W. Diokno. Martial law under Ferdinand Marcos was a period marked by massive government corruption, cronyism, economic recession, and gross violations of human rights.

=== Nationalist forms in the opposition ===
The media reports of the time just before the declaration of Martial Law classified the various Nationalist civil society groups opposing Marcos into two categories. The "moderates", which included church groups, civil libertarians, and nationalist politicians, were those who wanted to create change through political reforms. The "radicals", including a number of labor and student groups, wanted broader, more systemic political reforms. However, Marcos' actions during that time radicalized many otherwise "moderate" opposition members, with key incidents including: "First Quarter Storm" protests of 1970; the February 1971 Diliman Commune; the August 1971 suspension of the writ of habeas corpus in the wake of the Plaza Miranda bombing; the September 1972 declaration of martial law; the 1980 murder of Macli-ing Dulag; and the August 1983 assassination of Ninoy Aquino.

=== Marcos nationalist propaganda ===
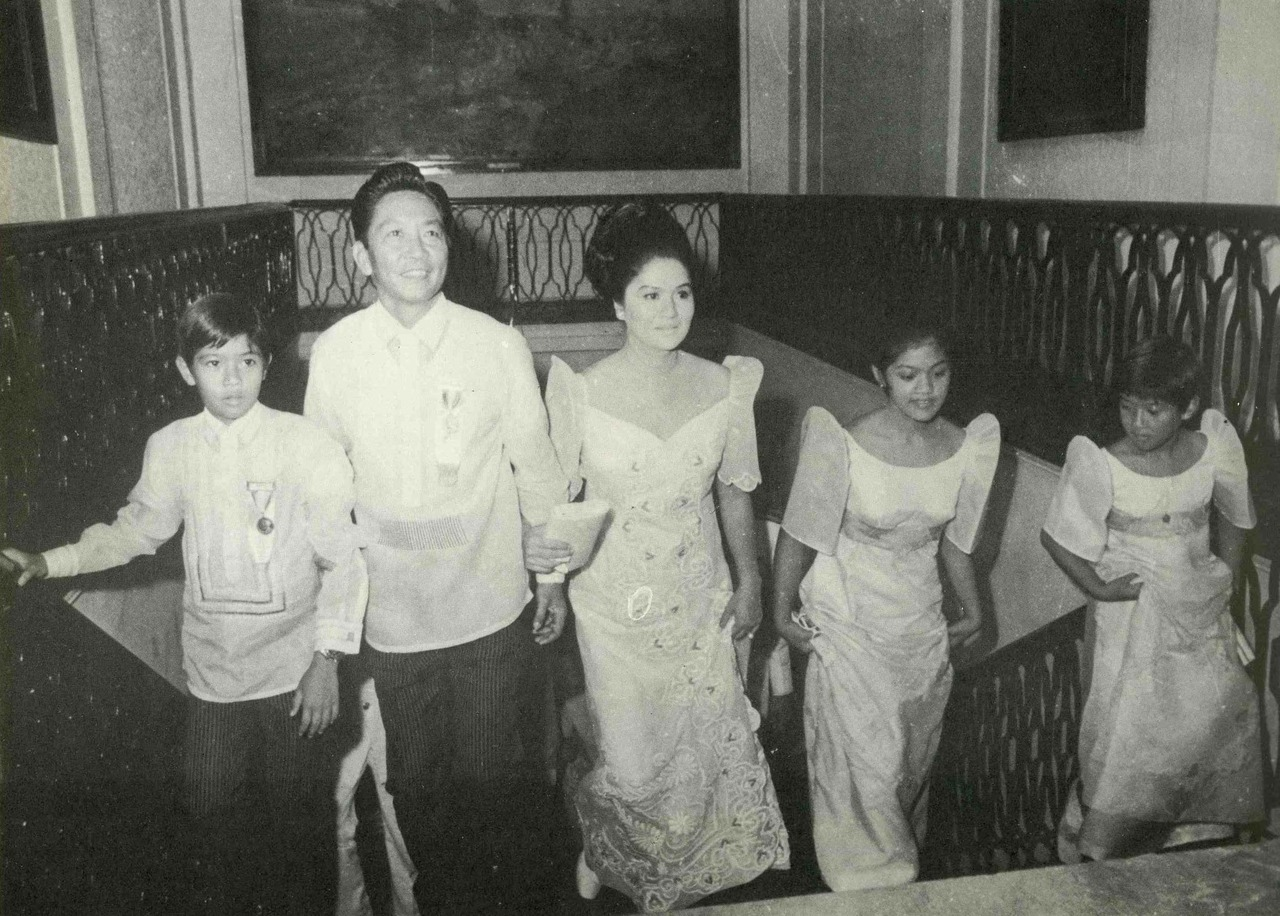
The Marcos family

Marcos developed a Ferdinand Marcos' cult of personality as a way of holding on to power for a further 14 years. Among Marcos' rationalizations for the declaration of martial law were the linked ideologies of the "bagong lipunan" ("new society") and of "constitutional authoritarianism," claiming there was a need to "reform society" by placing it under the control of a "benevolent dictator" in a "constitutional authority" which could guide the undisciplined populace through a period of chaos. Marcos supported the ideology of "constitutional authoritarianism" with various exercises in social engineering, united under the banner of the "bagong lipunan." The Philippine education system underwent a major period of restructuring in after the declaration of Martial Law in 1972, in which the teaching of civics and history was reoriented so that it would reflect values which supported the Bagong Lipunan and its ideology of constitutional authoritarianism. His administration also took control of the mass media to silence public criticism and produced an array of propaganda materials – including speeches, books, lectures, slogans, and numerous propaganda songs – to promote it.

Marcos cast a propaganda image himself as King, and of his wife Imelda as Queen, in the vein of early Philippine Barangay settlements and the Maharlika warrior class, as well as the mythological adam and eve figures of "Malakas and Maganda."

To support this, Marcos and Imelda spent a big part of the government budget on grandiose construction projects, a propaganda technique eventually labelled the Marcoses' "edifice complex". This included "designer hospitals" meant to project the administration's "state of the art" status, and cultural edifices such as the National Arts Center and the Cultural Center of the Philippines complex, which cast the Marcoses as patrons of the arts.

The first years of martial law saw an increase in military hardware and personnel in the Philippines, as well as a short-lived boost in agricultural productivity. By encouraging the use of recently invented "miracle" rice variant IR8 the administration was able to raise rice production (which increased 42% in 8 years), to decrease dependence on food importation during the early years of Martial Law, although the gains collapsed in the 1980s when the farm credit system under Marcos' Masagana 99 program ran out of money after having become a vehicle of political patronage.

To help finance his administration's projects, the Marcos government borrowed large amounts of money from international lenders. Thus, proving that the country was not yet fully independent economically. The Philippines' external debt rose from $360 million (US) in 1962 to $28.3 billion in 1986, making the Philippines one of the most indebted countries in Asia.

== The Fifth Republic (1986–present) ==
From February 22–25, 1986, many demonstrations against Marcos took place on a long stretch of Epifanio de los Santos Avenue. The event, known as the People Power Revolution, involved many famous figures such as Archbishop Jaime Sin, Lt. Gen. Fidel Ramos and Defense Minister Juan Ponce Enrile. Finally, on February 25, the Marcos family was transported by U.S. Air Force HH-3E rescue helicopters to Clark Air Base to Angeles City, Pampanga, about 83 kilometers north of Manila, before boarding US Air Force DC-9 Medivac and C-141B planes bound for Andersen Air Force Base in Guam, and finally to Hickam Air Force Base in Hawaii where Marcos arrived on February 26. Many people around the world rejoiced and congratulated Filipinos they knew. Corazon Aquino succeeded as president of the Philippines.

In 1986, Aquino adopted Original Pilipino Music (OPM, defined as "any musical composition created by a Filipino, whether the lyrics be in Pilipino, English or in any other language or dialect") by requiring hourly broadcasts of OPM songs on all radio programs having musical formats in order to conserve, promote and popularize the nation's historical and cultural heritage and resources, as well as artistic creations, and to give patronage to arts and letters. Singers like Regine Velasquez, Randy Santiago, Ogie Alcasid, Gary Valenciano, Manilyn Reynes, Donna Cruz and others are contributed to the president's implementation of Filipino music over the airwaves. Stations like DZOO-FM, DWLS, etc., are adopted hourly OPMs effectively after the implementation. Aquino also encouraged the tourism sector to boost the national economy. Under her six-year term, the Department of Tourism launched a program called The Philippines: Fiesta Islands of Asia in 1989, offers tourist visits in the country to show their natural wonders, to protect their indigenous peoples, to preserve heritage sites and to contribute historical importance. In 1987, then President Corazon C. Aquino penned Executive Order No. 118 creating the Presidential Commission on Culture and Arts. Five years later, in 1992, this presidential directive was enacted into law—Republic Act 7356, creating the National Commission for Culture and the Arts (NCCA).

On June 12, 1998, the nation celebrated its centennial year of independence from Spain. The celebrations were held simultaneously nationwide by then President Fidel V. Ramos and Filipino communities worldwide. A commission was established for the said event, the National Centennial Commission headed by former vice president Salvador Laurel presided all events around the country. One of the major projects of the commission was the Expo Pilipino, a grand showcase of the Philippines' growth as a nation for the last 100 years, in the Clark Special Economic Zone (formerly Clark Air Base) in Angeles City, Pampanga.

During his term, President Joseph Estrada ordered to the National Telecommunications Commission (NTC) to adopt a Filipino language-based radio format known as masa—named for his icon term Masa (or Masses). All radio stations adopted the masa format in 1998. Many stations continued to use the masa format after President Estrada left the presidency in 2001 because the masa format resonated with listeners. Some in the radio industry decry the effects masa formatting has had.

On August 14, 2010, President Benigno Aquino III directed the Department of Transportation and Communications (DOTC) and the NTC to fully implement Executive Order No. 255, issued on July 25, 1987, by former Philippines President Corazon Aquino, requiring all radio stations to broadcast a minimum of four original Filipino musical compositions in every clock hour of programs with a musical format.

On November 4, 2010, Philippine TV network ABS-CBN released its 2010–2011 Christmas Station ID Ngayong Pasko Magniningning Ang Pilipino (lit. 'The Filipinos will Shine this Christmas'), with the station ID features the Philippine flag, montages relating to the Philippine nationalism and patriotism such as the Pinoy pride, and the flag's sun being used as the parol or star making it an octagram or eight-sided star.

On April 13, 2012, The Manila Times, the oldest English language newspaper in the Philippines, published an editorial titled "Unpatriotic editing and reporting," taking the Filipino journalistic community to task for their reporting of what it described as "confrontation between our Philippine Navy and 'law enforcement' ships of the People's Republic of China" in the Spratly Islands. The editorial opined that Philippine reports should state that disputed territories are Philippine territory, and characterized those who refer to disputed territories as "being claimed by the Philippines" as "unpatriotic writers and editors".

The West Philippine Sea

On February 14, 2013, National Book Store, the Philippines' largest bookstore chain, has withdrawn Chinese-made globes, which reflect China's nine-dotted line encompassing the South China Sea, from its shelves. Department of Foreign Affairs spokesman Raul Hernandez said in a statement that, "[National Bookstore] has taken a patriotic position to proactively support the Philippine government in advancing Philippine foreign policy objectives." He said the decision to pull out the globes came after a dialogue with the bookstore management, which claimed they were unaware of the “misinformation” contained in the educational materials.

== Contemporary challenges ==
=== Socioeconomic challenges ===
According to Paul David Cruz from the Philippine Daily Inquirer, corruption in every sector is making the Philippines not to be proud of. He also made mention of the inequality in getting jobs abroad for ordinary citizens, unlike in Malaysia or Singapore.

...I also don’t care if you’re going to burst into song about why you’re proud to be Pinoy despite everything. Please drop the pretentiousness. You are either from a privileged background with your safety nets to catch you when the crap hits the fan, or far worse, a person who’s deluding himself into thinking everything’s fine...

— Paul David Cruz, Philippine Daily Inquirer

=== Colonial mentality ===
According to Filipino historian Renato Constantino, cultural imperialism has hindered nation-building in the Philippines, leading to a loss of historical continuity and a Filipino sense of collective becoming. The emphasis on modernity and progress, often influenced by Western ideas, has contributed to a "colonial mentality" that perpetuates feelings of inferiority and blind acceptance of American superiority.

=== Ethnocentricity and regionalism ===
Lisandro E. Claudio from Rappler expressed that the term "Filipino" is not a race.

Nationalism is a dynamic and evolving concept, and the Philippines is no exception. The idea of a Philippine nation was imposed by colonial powers, particularly during the Spanish period, which was most severe in Luzon. This led to a Tagalog-based Philippine revolution. Despite the diversity of languages and cultures in the Philippines, Tagalog-oriented nationalism has been a dominant force.

Kathleen Weekley, author on socio-political challenges in the Philippines, argued that the country should focus on a radical democratic agenda that recognizes the importance of the state and addresses social cleavages. Weekley further added that the Philippines is a multicultural state with a diverse set of cultures. Having nationalism based on ethnicity will be "impossible" for the nation to unite.
