= Concordia College (Manila) =

Roman Catholic college in Manila, Philippines

- Colegio de la Inmaculada Concepcion de la Concordia (Spanish)
- Former names: Escuela Pia (1868); Colegio de la Inmaculada Concepcion de la Concordia
- Motto: Sciencia et Virtus; Veritas et Vita
- Motto in English: Knowledge and Virtue; Truth and Life
- Type: Private basic and higher education institution / Women's college (until 1985)
- Established: May 3, 1868; 158 years ago
- Founder: Margarita Róxas de Ayala
- Religious affiliation: Roman Catholic (Daughters of Charity)
- President: Sr. Nicetas M. Favorito, DC
- Principal: Nereann Tuaño
- Location: Pedro Gil Street, Paco, Manila, The Philippines; 14°34′52″N 121°00′09″E
- Patroness: Mary, mother of Jesus (Under the title Our Lady of the Immaculate Conception)
- Colors: Blue and White
- Website: laconcordia.edu.ph
- Location in Manila Location in Metro Manila Location in Luzon Location in the Philippines

The College of the Immaculate Conception of Concordia (Spanish: Colegio de la Inmaculada Concepcion de la Concordia), commonly known as Concordia College, is a private Catholic basic and higher education institution run by Daughters of Charity of Saint Vincent de Paul in Paco, Manila, in the Philippines. The college was founded in 1868 by Margarita Roxas de Ayala.

== History ==
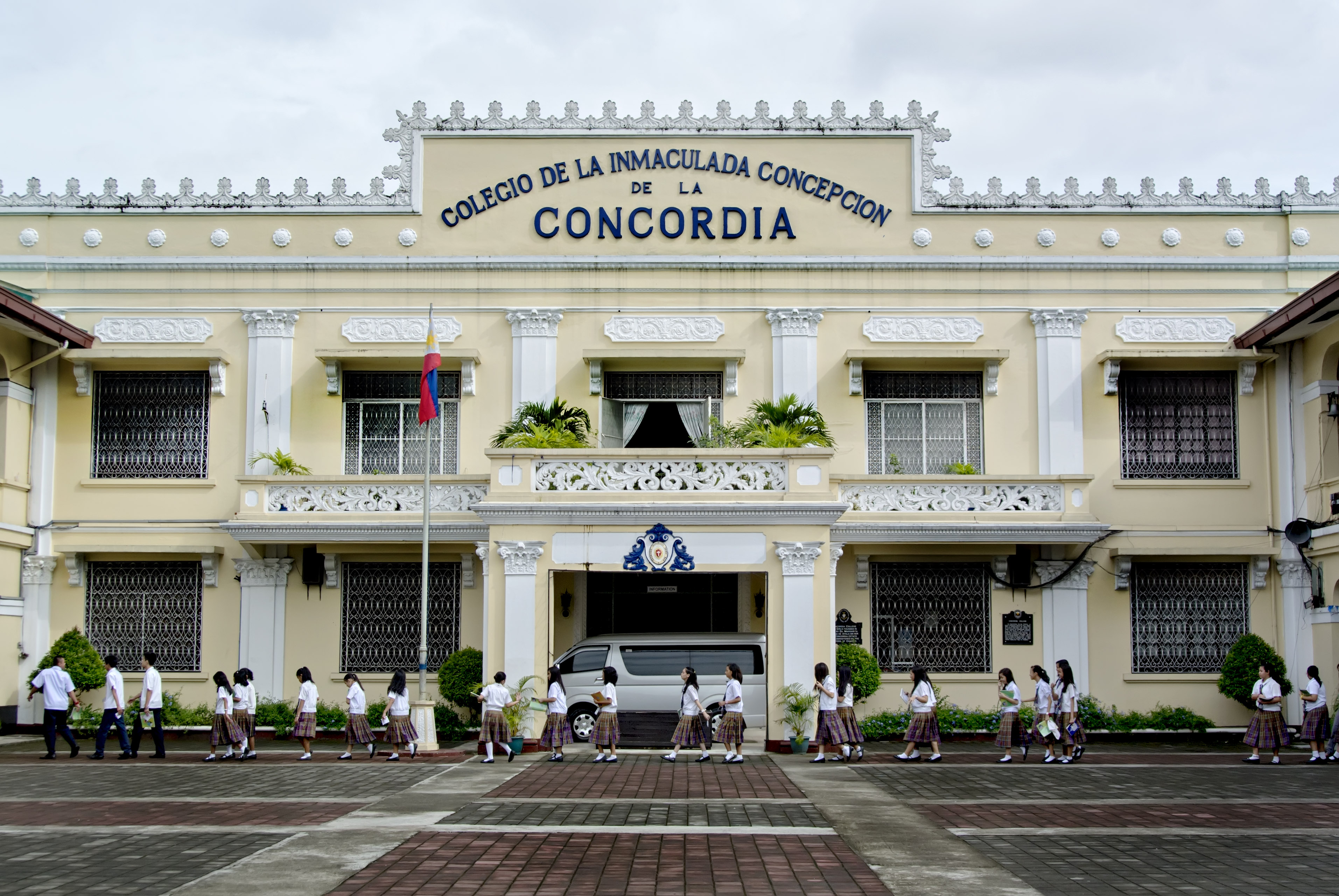
Facade of the main building

The Colegio de la Inmaculada Concepcion de la Concordia was established by Margarita Róxas de Ayala from the Zóbel de Ayala family who converted her three-and-a-half-hectare villa, the La Concordia Estate in Paco, Manila, into a girls' school. She requested eight nuns from the Daughters of Charity from Spain to come to the Philippines to administer the school. They arrived on May 3, 1868, and operated the free school or Escuela Pia. Sixty students enrolled and were taught religion, good manners, reading and writing, simple arithmetic, culture, and arts like sewing, embroidery, cooking, needlecraft and household work. The medium of instruction was Spanish.

The existing structure was expanded. By the early 1900s, five sixth of the Concordia complex was added since 1868. It also became the headquarters of the Daughters of Charity in the Philippines.

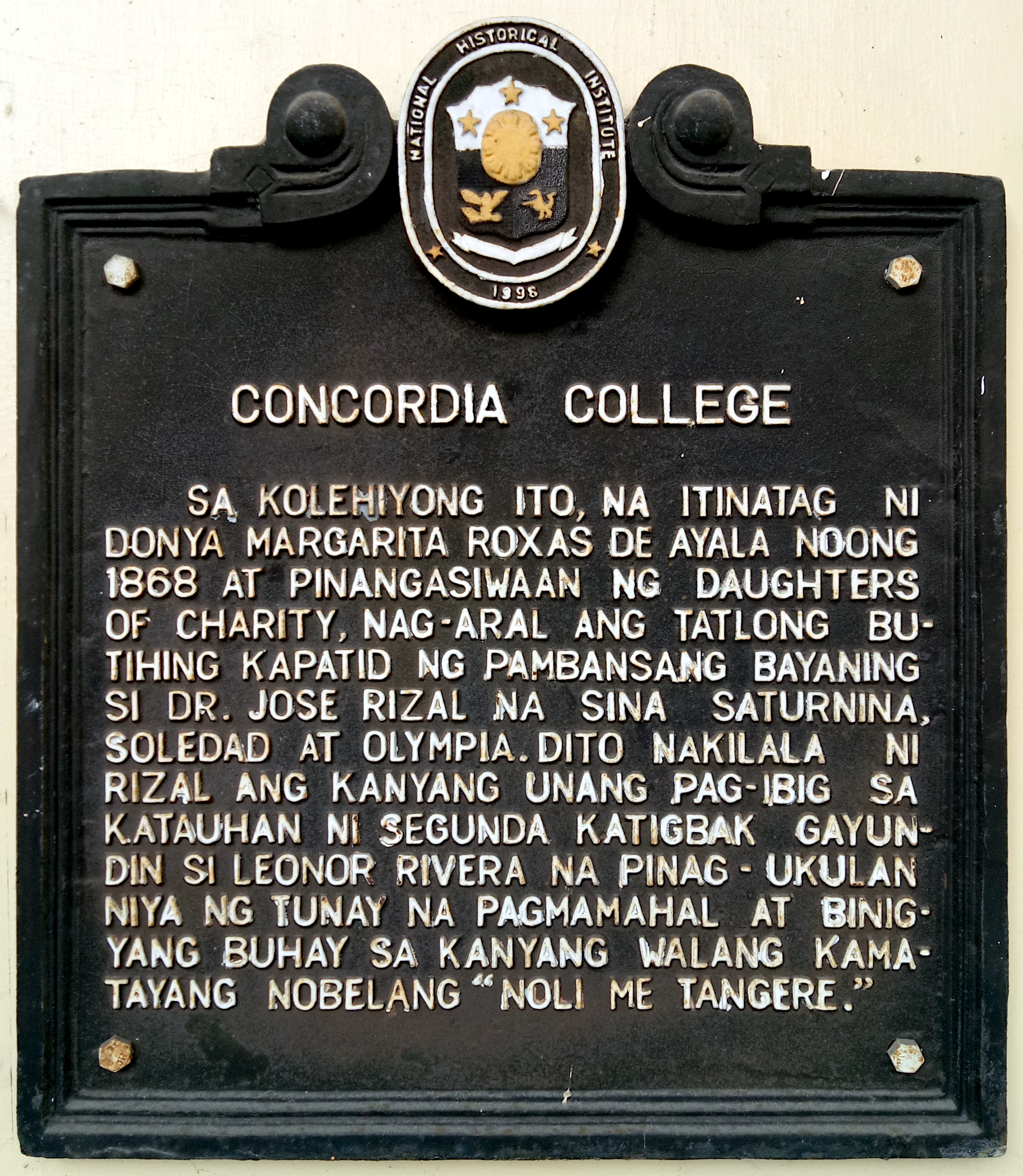
National historical marker installed in 1996

The school building was damaged during the 1945 Battle of Manila of World War II.

The Concordia College's higher education department began admitting male students in 1985 becoming co-educational.
