= Luis Rodríguez-Varela =

Philippine protonationalist (1768–1824)

Luis Manuel Valentín Rodríguez-Varela y Sancena (13 February 1768–7 December 1824), also known as El Conde Filipino (literally, "The Philippine Count" in Spanish), was a Philippine protonationalist who flourished during the Spanish colonial era.

An insular Spaniard, Rodríguez-Varela published a series of books advocating social change in the Spanish Philippines, inspired by the Enlightenment and the French Revolution. His most important work is El parnaso filipino, published in Sampaloc, Manila in 1814.

He advocated the opening of local colleges to teach subjects such as mathematics, medicine, and navigation, as well as free primary schools for the poor. Rodríguez-Varela also believed that foreign powers held too much influence over the local economy, and he accordingly worked to limit Chinese intrusion in the region by bolstering the local business associations.

Along with José Ortega, Rodríguez-Varela was one of several people expelled from the island by Governor Juan Antonio Martínez on February 18, 1823, when they were accused of conspiring against the local Spanish government.

== See also ==
- Spanish Philippines
- Spanish East Indies
- Captaincy General of the Philippines
- Spanish Filipino
