= Basque center =

Ethnocultural community centers

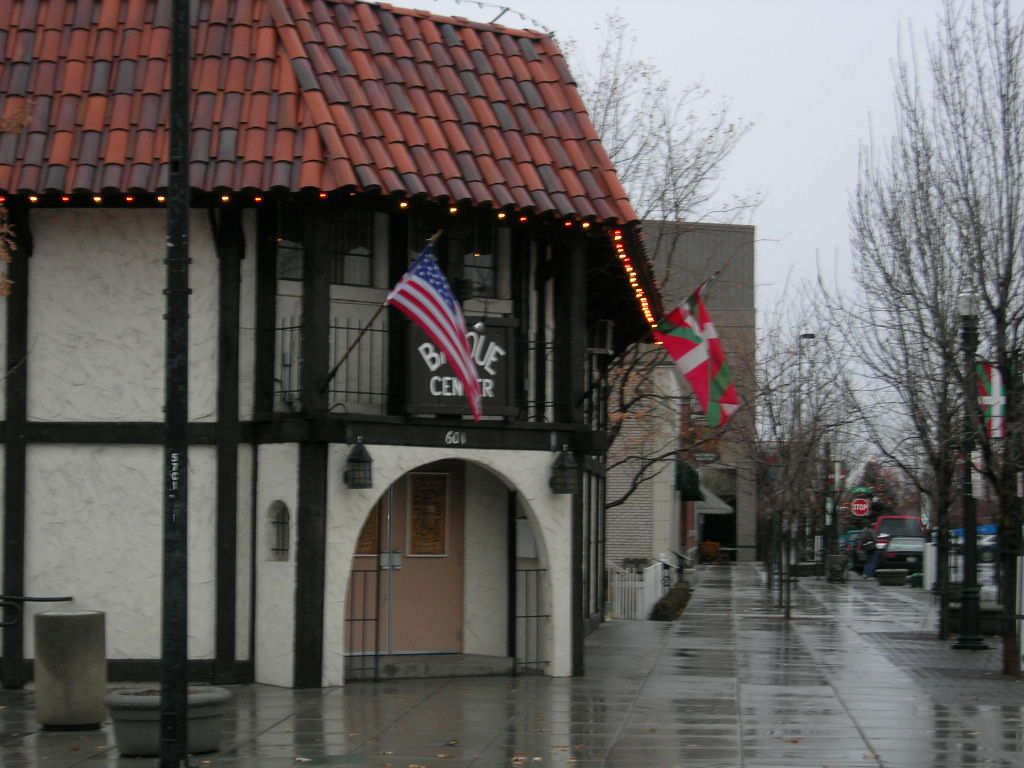
Basque center in Boise, Idaho

Basque centers (Basque: euskal etxeak or eusko etxeak, lit. 'Basque houses') are associative organizations that emerged at the end of the 19th century in cities with a significant Basque diaspora, with the purpose of helping each other and maintaining links with the Basque Country and Basque culture. They are also meeting points for Basques who live across the world.

Basque centers were established to recover documents concerning the history of Basque exile and migration by means of research, digitalization, photographs, and oral testimonies. There are more than 150 Basque centers located worldwide. Most of them are in Argentina, extending in and around Buenos Aires. 10% of the Argentine population is of Basque descent, and the Juan de Garay Foundation works with the Basque Argentine community. They do genealogical research, among other things. The United States has more than 30 Basque centers, coordinated by the North American Basque Organizations since 1973. 57,793 Basque Americans were registered in the 2000 United States census, including 20,868 in California, 6,637 in Idaho, 6,096 in Nevada, 2,665 in Washington, and 2,627 in Oregon. There are ten Basque centers in Spain and two in France.

Apart from the Basque centers, there are also several organizations and associations related to the Basque diaspora. Among the most important ones is the Center for Basque Studies research area in Reno.

== History ==
In the times of the European colonization of the Americas, Basque institutions arose in Peru, Mexico (Colegio de San Ignacio de Loyola Vizcaínas), and other locations. It was not until the 19th century that modern Basque centers began to emerge. These dates also coincide with the massive emigration to America and the choice of new destinations. Most of them travelled to Argentina and Uruguay. It is not known which was exactly the first Basque center that was created in this epoch, but one likely candidate is the Basque Center of Havana, the capital city of Cuba, in 1868, even though until now it was the Basque Center of Montevideo, in 1876. The certain thing is that it was a very extensive phenomenon in the Americas.

Afterwards, there was another big wave of Basque emigration with the political exile of the Spanish postwar period, which contributed to the renaissance of the Basque centers that received new emigrants who were escaping from the civil war. They thought it was going to be for a short period of time, but in many cases, they did not return home. Some of the countries that received the largest number of exiles of the Spanish Civil War were Chile, Uruguay, Mexico, and especially Argentina.

In the Basque Country, they approved in the Basque Parliament the Law by which the relations with Basque communities of the exterior were regulated. It is provided with the legal necessary base for the Basque Government.

== Objectives ==
Basque centers are defined as associative entities. They are legally constituted out of the Basque Country. They have the following objectives:

- To contribute to the strength of the Basque collectivities and Basque centers, favoring his cohesion and the efficiency of his associative actions.
- To preserve and promote the links of the Basque collectivities and Basque centers with the Basque Country.
- To project the recognition of the reality of the Basque Country where the Basque collectivities are located, promoting activities of spreading, impulse, developing the culture, and the Basque economy.
- To benefit relations, especially social, cultural, and economic relations with different countries that rely on Basque collectivities, institutions, and different social agents.
- To facilitate the establishment of communication channels between Basque residents outside of the territory of the Basque Autonomous Community and the public powers of it.

The approval of the Law in the Basque Parliament, without any vote against it, marked the beginning of a new phase of relations between the collectivities of the exterior and the public Basque institutions.

== List of Basque centers ==
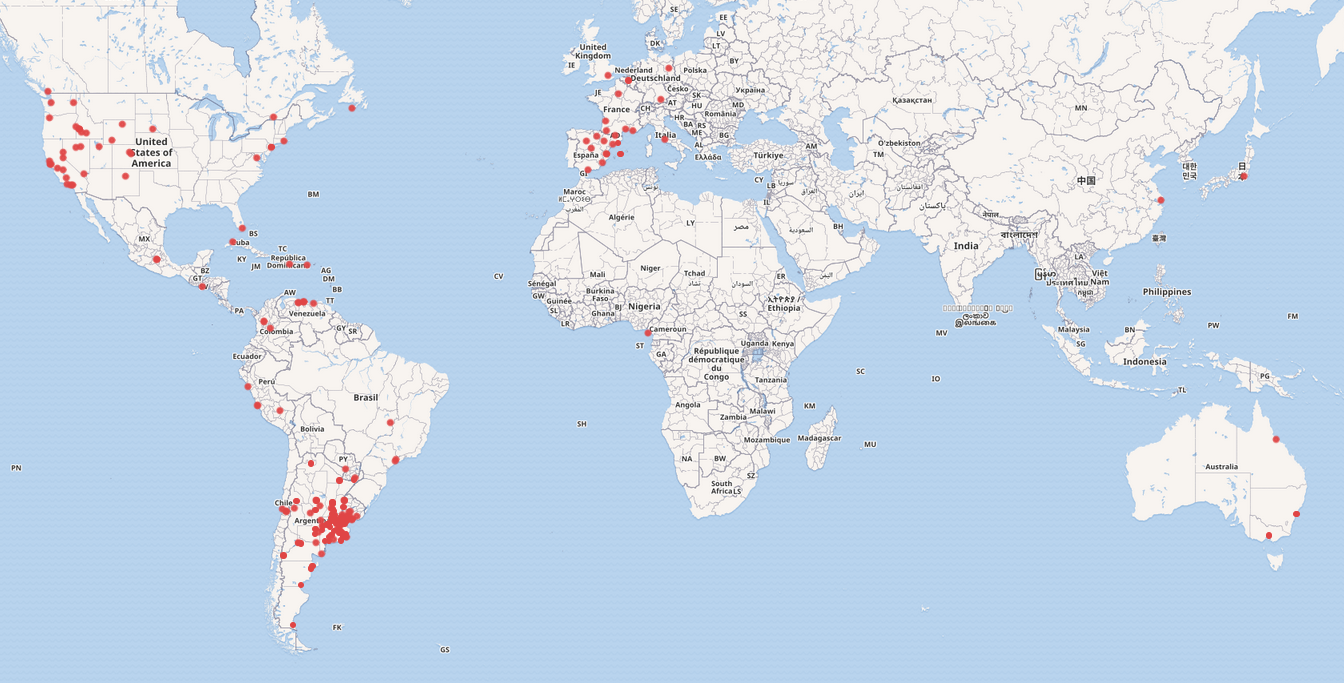
Map of Basque centers as of 2025

=== Andorra (1) ===
- Euskal Etxea d'Andorra, Santa Coloma

=== Argentina (85) ===
- Centro Vasco del Chaco "Kotoiaren Lurra", Resistencia
- Centro Vasco Itxaropena de Saladillo, Buenos Aires
- Escuela de Lengua Vasca de Buenos Aires Euskaltzaleak, Buenos Aires
- Centro Vasco "Ibai Guren", Paraná
- Centro Vasco Zazpirak Bat, Rosario
- Centro Vasco Denak Bat de Mendoza, Mendoza
- Centro Vasco "Villegas´ko Euskaldunak", Buenos Aires
- Centro Laurak Bat, Buenos Aires
- Centro Vasco Denak Bat Cañuelas, Buenos Aires
- Colectividad Vasca de Concordia, Concordia
- Centro Basko "Euzko Etxea", Buenos Aires
- Centro Vasco "Toki Eder", Buenos Aires
- Centro Vasco Gure Txokoa de Rauch (visita Ardanbera)
- Centro Vasco Denak Bat de Temperley
- Centro Vasco Euskal Etxea Villa Mercedes, Villa Mercedes
- Centro Vasco Argentino Zingirako Euskaldunak, Buenos Aires
- Hiru Erreka, Centro Vasco de Tres Arroyos
- Asociación Unión Vasca Euzko Alkartasuna, La Pampa
- Danak Bat Centro Vasco Argentino de Bolívar, Buenos Aires
- Colegios 'Euskal Echea' (Lavallol eta Buenos Aires)
- Iparralde Dantzari Taldea, Buenos Aires
- Asociación Coral 'Lagun Onak', Buenos Aires
- Coral Alkartasuna, Buenos Aires
- Centro Vasco Argentino Beti Aurrera, Buenos Aires
- Centro Vasco Euskal-Etxea San Nicolás, Buenos Aires
- Centro Vasco "Hiru Erreka"
- Federación de Entidades Vasco Argentinas - FEVA
- Fundación Vasco Argentina Juan de Garay, Buenos Aires
- Asociación Vasco Argentina Urrundik, Paraná
- Centro Vasco de Santa Cruz Hegoalde Argentinarra, Río Gallegos
- Euskaldunak Denak Bat Sociedad de Socorros Mutuos, Buenos, Aires
- Centro Vasco Euskal Odola de Ayacucho, Buenos Aires
- Centro Basko Azuleño "Gure Txokoa", Buenos Aires
- Unión Vasca Sociedad de Socorros Mutuos, Buenos Aires
- Centro Vasco Balcarce'ko Euskaldunak, Buenos Aires
- Centro Vasco Argentino "Danak Anaiak", Buenos Aires
- Centro Vasco Euskalduna, Buenos Aires
- Centro Vasco "Guillermo Larregui", Buenos Aires
- Denak Elkarrekin, Buenos Aires
- Asociación Centro Vasco "Eusko Biltzar", Buenos Aires
- Centro Vasco "Eusko Aterpea", Buenos Aires
- Centro Vasco "Arbola Bat", Buenos Aires
- Centro Vasco Argentino "Lagunen Etxea", Buenos Aires
- Centro Vasco Loreta'ko Euskaldunak, Buenos Aires
- Centro Vasco Denak Bat de Lomas de Zamora, Buenos Aires
- Centro Vasco "Ongi Etorri", Buenos Aires
- Centro Vasco Anaitasuna, Buenos Aires
- Centro Vasco Denak Bat de Mar de Plata, Buenos Aires
- Centro Vasco "Gure Eusko Tokia", Buenos Aires
- Centro Basko Argentino "Euzko Etxea" de Necochea, Buenos Aires
- Centro Basko "Etxe Alai", Buenos Aires
- Centro Basko Lagun Onak, Buenos Aires
- Centro Vasco "Nuestro Rincón - Gure Txokoa", Buenos Aires
- Centro Vasco "Eusko - Deya" de Salliqueló, Buenos Aires
- Centro Vasco de Suipacha Gure Txokoa, Buenos Aires
- Centro Vasco Argentino 'Gure Etxea', Buenos Aires
- Centro Basko Euskal Sustraiak, Buenos Aires
- Gure Etxea - Casa de la Cultura Vasca, Buenos Aires
- Acción Vasca de la Argentina, Buenos Aires
- Asociación Emakume Abertzale Batza, Buenos Aires
- Centro Vasco Francés, Buenos Aires
- Club Vasco Argentino Gure Echea, Buenos Aires
- Euskal Echea Asociación Cultural y Beneficencia, Buenos Aires
- Eusko Kultur Etxea - Casa de la Cultura Vasca, Buenos Aires
- Asociación Euskal Echea de Socorros Mutuos, Comodoro Rivadavia
- Centro Vasco del Noreste del Chubut, Trelew
- Centro Vasco Argentino "Gure Txokoa", Córdoba
- Centro Vasco "Gure Ametza", Río Cuarto
- Centro Vasco "Euzko-Etxea", Villa-María
- Asociación Vasca Ibai Txori, Concepción de Uruguay
- Centro Vasco "Denak Bat" de Jujuy, San Salvador de Jujuy
- Asociación Centro Rincón Vasco "Euzko Txokoa", La Pampa
- Centro Vasco "Zelaiko Euskal Etxea", La Pampa
- Centro Atuel'ko Euskotarrak, Mendoza
- Asociación Civil Eusko Etxea de Corpus Christi, Corpus Christi
- Asociación Civil Centro Vasco Misiones, Posadas
- Centro Vasco del Comahue "Zazpirak Bat", Cipolletti
- Centro Vasco "Gure Etxea", Río Negro
- Centro Vasco Ibaiko Euskaldunak, Río Negro
- Centro Basko Mendi'ko Euzko Etxea, Río Negro
- Centro Basko Beti Aurrera Aberri Etxea de Patagones y Viedma, Viedma
- Centro "Eusko - Etxea" de San Juan, San Juan
- Asociación de Mujeres Vascas, Rosario
- Centro Vasco Argentino Gure Etxea, Santa Fe
- Asociación Cultural Denak-Bat, Buenos Aires

=== Australia (3) ===
- Gure Txoko Basque Club, Sydney, NSW
- The Basque Club of North Queensland - Australia, Townsville - Castletown, QLD
- Basque Society - Gure Txoko, Melbourne, VIC

=== Brazil (2) ===
- Eusko Alkartasuna de Säo Paulo, São Paulo
- Eusko-Brasildar Etxea, Tremembé

=== Canada (2) ===
- Zazpiak Bat Basque Society, Vancouver
- Euskaldunak, Association des Basques du Québec, Montréal

=== Chile (3) ===
- Eusko Etxea - Casa Vasca de Chile, Santiago
- Eusko Etxea - Casa Vasca de Valparaíso, Viña del Mar, Valparaíso
- Fundación Vasco Chilena para el Desarrollo, Santiago

=== China (1) ===
- Shanghaiko Euskal Etxea, Shanghai

=== Dominican Republic (1) ===
- Casa Vasca Euskal Etxea de Sto Domingo, Santo Domingo

=== Colombia (1) ===
- Fundación Centro Vasco Euskal Etxea, Bogotá

=== Cuba (1) ===
- Asociación Vasco Navarra de Beneficencia, Havana

=== El Salvador (1) ===
- Centro Vasco de El Salvador Euskal Etxea, San Salvador

=== Equatorial Guinea (1) ===
- Bat Eginez, Malabo

=== Germany (2) ===
- Basque German association
- Gernika: Deutsch-Baskische Kulturverein E.V, Berlin

=== France (7) ===
- Parisko Eskual Etxea - La Maison Basque de Paris, Paris
- Choeur d'Hommes Basque 'Anaiki' Gizon Abesbatza, Paris
- Gernika Dantza Taldea, Paris
- Lagunt eta Maita, Paue
- Eskual Etxea, Bordele
- Eskualdunak - Association des Basques de Montpellier et sa Region, Montpellier
- Lagunt eta Maita Euskal Etxea, Paue

=== Italy (1) ===
- Associazione Culturale Euskara - Erromako Euskal Etxea, Erroma

=== Japan (1) ===
- Tokyo-ko Euskal Etxea, Tokyo

=== Mexico (3) ===
- Centro Vasco Euskal Etxea A.C. de México DF, Mexico City
- Instituto Vasco Mexicano de Desarrollo, Mexico City
- Sukalde, Asociación Civil, Mexico City
- VascosMexico, Querétar

=== Paraguay (1) ===
- Euskal Etxea Jasone, Asunción

=== Peru (7) ===
- Euskal Etxea de Lima, Lima
- Asociación Civil Cultural Virgen del Juncal, Urubamba, Kuzko
- Limako Arantzazu Euzko Etxea, Miraflores, Lima 15073.
- Arequipa-ko Euzko Etxea - Casa Vasca de Arequipa, Arequipa.
- Xauxa-ko Euzko Etxea, Casa Vasca de Jauja, Jauja, Junin.
- Limako Arantzazuko Andre Mariaren Ermandadea, San Isidro, Lima
- Asociación Pelotaris del Perú, La Punta, Provincia Constitucional del Callao, Lima, Perú

=== Spain (10) ===
- Euskal Etxea - Hogar Vasco de Madrid, Madrid
- Centro Vasco "Gure Txoko, Valladolid
- Asociación Cultural "Laminiturri", Logroño
- Bartzelonako Euskal Etxea, Barcelona
- Malagako Euskal Etxea - Casa Vasca de Málaga, Málaga
- Centro Vasco de Salou "Txoko Lagun Artea", Salou
- Federación de Centros 'Euskal Herria', Madrid
- Centro Vasco Navarro Laurak Bat de Valencia, Valencia
- Asociación Cultural Euskal Etxea de Murcia, Zarandona, Murcia
- Euskal Etxea Artea, Palma, Balearic Islands

=== Switzerland (1) ===
- Suitzako Euskal Etxea - Baskischer Kulturverein

=== United Kingdom (4) ===
- Basque Society - Euskal Elkartea, London
- Bristol Basque Cultural Society, Bristol
- Cambridge University Basque Society, Cambridge
- Basque Dancing Society at New Castle University, Newcastle

=== United States (44) ===
- North American Basque Organization (NABO), Elko, NV
- Center for Basque Studies, Reno, NV
- Cenarrusa Center for Basque Studies, Boise, ID
- Society of Basque Studies in America, New York, NY
- Basque Educational Organization (BEO)
- Basque Museum & Cultural Center, Boise, ID
- Basque Associations of Boise, Boise, ID
- Euzkaldunak - Boise Basque Center, Boise, ID
- Txoko Ona Basque Club, Homedale, ID
- Oinkari Basque Dancers, Boise, ID
- Ontario Basque Club, Ontario, OR
- Gauden Bat, Chino, CA
- Chino Basque Club, Chino, CA
- Kent County Basque Club, Bakersfield, CA
- Basque Club of California, San Frantzisko, CA
- San Francisco Basque Cultural Center, San Frantzisko, CA
- Seattle Euskal Etxea, Seattle, WA
- Euzko-Etxea of New York, New York, NY
- Alkartasuna Basque Club of Southwest Wyoming, Rock Springs, WY
- Elko Euskaldunak Club, Elko, NV
- Zazpiak Bat Basque Club, Reno, NV
- Zenbat Gara Dantzari Taldea, Reno, NV
- Basque Club of Utah, Salt Lake City, UT
- Colorado Euskal Etxea - The Colorado Basque Club, Arvada, CO
- New Mexico Euskal Etxea
- Los Angeles Oberena Basque Club, Downey, CA
- Fresno Basque Club, Fresno, CA
- Los Banos Basque Club, Los Banos, CA
- Marin - Sonoma Basque Association, Novato, CA
- Southern California Basque Club, Ontario, CA
- Anaitasuna Basque Club, San Frantzisko, CA
- Ventura County Basque Club, Thousand Oaks, CA
- Txoko Alai - Euskal Etxea of Miami, Miami, FL
- Gooding Basque Association, Boise, ID
- Euskal Lagunak, Mountain Home, ID
- Battle Mountain Oberenak Club, Battle Mountain, NV
- Mendiko Euskaldun Cluba, Gardenville, NV
- Lagun Onak Las Vegas Basque Club, Las Vegas, NV
- Portland Basque Club, West Linn, OR
- Washington D.C. Euskal Etxea, Alexandria, VA
- Inland Northwest Euskal Etxea, Spokane, WA
- Big Horn Basque Club, Buffalo, WY
- Vascos en Puerto Rico, San Juan, PR

=== Uruguay (9) ===
- Saltoko Euskaldunen Taldea, Salto
- Ibai Ondoko Etxea, Carmelo, Colonia
- Euskal Etxea Juan L. Lacaze, Juan L. Lacaze, Colonia
- Gure Etxea Colonia, Rosario, Colonia
- Euskal Etxea Durazno, Durazno
- Confraternidad Vasca "Gure Baserria", Minas, Lavalleja
- Centro Vasco "Euskal Erria", Montevideo
- Federación de Instituciones Vascas de Uruguay - FIVU, Montevideo
- Haize Hegoa, Montevideo

=== Venezuela (5) ===
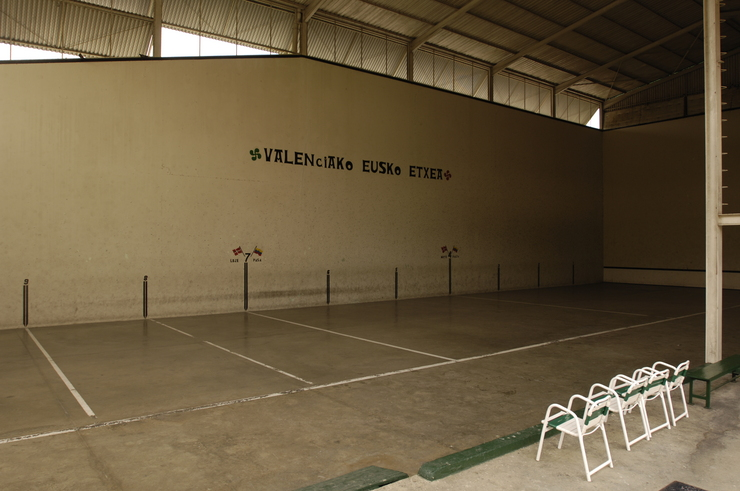
Fronton in Venezuela

- Caracasko Eusko Etxea / Centro Vasco de Caracas (Caracas)
- Valenciako Eusko Etxea / Centro Vasco Venezolano de Carabobo (Valencia, Carabobo)
- Eusko Etxea Barcelona - Puerto La Cruz (Lechería, Anzoategui)
- Venezuelako Eusko Etxeen Federazioa / Federación de Centros Vascos de Venezuela (Valencia, Carabobo). Valenciako Eusko Etxean du egoitza.
- Sukalde Venezuela, A.C. (Caracas)
