= Spaniards in the Philippines =

Spaniards in the Philippines may refer to either:

- the Spanish colonial presence in the country; or,
- Spanish-Filipino (disambiguation).
