= Hispano-Filipino =

Hispano-Filipino may refer to:

- Spanish Filipino – an ethnic group who has Spanish or Hispanic lineage, mostly born and raised in the Philippines.
- Insulares – one of the archaic terms, used in the Spanish East Indies, for Philippine-born Spaniards.
- anything linking the Philippines, and Spain or Latin America together or pertaining to the Spanish Empire’s legacy in the Philippines.
