= Hispanofilipino =

Hispanofilipino may refer to:

- Spanish Filipino, an ethnic group who has Spanish or Hispanic lineage, mostly born and raised in the Philippines
- Filipino people of Spanish ancestry,- Filipino people who were originally from Spain or descended from Spaniards who have settled into the Philippines
- one of the archaic terms, used in the Spanish East Indies, for Philippine-born Spaniards
- anything linking the Philippines, and Spain/Latin America together or pertaining to the Spanish Empire’s legacy in the Philippines
