= Spanish Filipinos =

Spanish Filipinos Hispano Filipinos
Total population
- History; Spanish colonial statistics: 5% of the Philippine population during the 1700s. Present; 2007-2024 statistics: 672,319 Hispanic Filipino diaspora worldwide.

Regions with significant populations

Diaspora
- Spain: 200,000 (2018 census)
- Mexico: 200,000 (2007)
- Australia: 128,693 (2021 census)
- United States: 0.4% (2021 census)
- Puerto Rico: 91,620 (2014 census)
- Canada: 41,575 (2021 census)
- Latin America: 5,479 (2024 census)
- Philippines: 4,952 (2020 census)

Languages
- Spanish (Philippine • Castilian); Spanish creole (Chavacano); English (Philippine, (Konyo)); Filipino (Tagalog • Indigenous Philippine languages)

Religion
- Christianity • Roman Catholic

Related ethnic groups
- Spanish diaspora (Basque diaspora) • Latin Americans • other Filipinos (including Filipino Mestizos)

Spanish diaspora
- Flag of the Hispanic people

Regions with significant populations
- Metro Manila, Bais City, Dumaguete City, Zamboanga City, Cebu City, Vigan, Iloilo City, Bauang

Languages
- Spanish (Philippine), Filipino, other Philippine languages, English (Konyo) and Chavacano

Religion
- Roman Catholic

Spanish Filipino or Hispanic Filipino (Spanish: Español Filipino, Hispano Filipino, Tagalog: Kastílang Pilipino, Cebuano: Katsílà) are people of Spanish and Filipino heritage. The term includes all individuals of Spanish descent in the Philippines, including criollos and mestizos who identify with Spanish culture, history and language.

According to the 2020 Philippine census, 4,952 individual citizens self-identified as ethnically Spanish in the Philippines.

Forming a small part of the Spanish diaspora, the heritage of Spanish Filipinos may come recently from Spain, from descendants of the earlier Spanish settlers during the Spanish colonial period in the Philippines, or from Spain's viceroyalties in Hispanic America, such as Mexico, whose capital Mexico City held administrative power over the captaincy general of the Philippines in the colonial era.

Many of their communities in Spain, the Americas, Australia, and the Philippines trace their origin to the early settlers from Europe and Mexico during the Spanish colonial period as well as native populations of Southeast Asia, and in recent overseas migration in the 1900s.

In the Philippines depending on the specific provinces, in the late 1700s to early 1800s they formed as much as 19% in the capital city of Manila at formerly named Tondo province, and about 1.38% of the Ilocos region, 2.17% of Cebu or 16.72% of Bataan and other parts of the country.

It is a common misconception that the word "Filipino" only referred to the Spanish population that settled in the Philippines during the colonial period. But in his book Barangay, the American historian William Henry Scott wrote that, though the Spaniards called the natives of the islands they named Filipinas, indios, ". . . when it was necessary to distinguish the indios of the Philippines from those of the Americas, they were called Filipinos. So Pedro Chirino’s 1604 Relación has a chapter on “The food and terms of course and food manners of the Filipinos” (Chirino 1604, 36), and Juan Francisco de San Antonio devotes a chapter of his 1738 Crónicas to “The letters, languages, and politeness of the Philipinos” (San Antonio 1738, 140), . . . In short, the people of the Philippines were called Filipinos when they were practicing their own culture — or, to put it another way, before they became indios”. He later on explains the misconception: “In the nineteenth century, Spaniards born in the colony began to be called Españoles filipinos to distinguish them from Spaniards born in Spain, a designation which was logically contracted to Filipinos when speaking of Spaniards. . . Sinibaldo de Mas (1843, 138) in his 1842 population estimates, more neutrally divides Spaniards and Filipinos into the following categories — Filipinos (indios), Espanoles filipinos, and Españoles europeos. “Indio filipino” was just how Francisco Suárez signed himself a century before when he engraved a portrait of Philip V for Pedro Murillo Velarde’s 1743 Cusus Juris Canonici (frontispiece), and native Filipinos were still using the term in the next century. As Jose Rizal (1887,111) said of the Philippine community in Madrid, “Creoles, Mestizos and Malays, we simply call ourselves Filipinos.” Furthermore, a manuscript prepared by Filipinas Royal Commissioner Don Sinibaldo de Mas, which was published in Madrid in 1843, referred to the natives as ‘filipinos’ who "originated in Borneo" and "believed in a powerful God they called Bathala Maykapal". de Mas furthermore iterated that the Spaniards "improperly" called the natives indios/Indians, and that there were many inhabitants in the islands who "passed as Filipinos and paid tribute", though they had European ancestry.

Spaniards, Latin Americans and Spanish-speaking Filipinos were referred to by native Filipinos as "Kastila", a word for "Castilian" which means the region and language of Castile.

Filipinos of Spanish backgrounds numbered at about 4,952 people, while Mestizo Filipinos of mixed native Filipino and European ancestry made up about 5% of the Philippines' population during the 1700s.

The abrupt decline of Spanish Filipinos as a percentage of the population is due to the events of the Philippine Revolution during the Philippine Republic in the late 1800s, as Filipinos of Spanish heritage choose to identify themselves as native Filipino, as part of establishing a united national identity in the country, or some have relocated back to Spain, or have migrated to other countries during that period.

During and after the second phase of the Philippine Revolution, the term "Filipino" included people of all nationalities and race, born in the Philippines.

Today, Hispanic Filipinos are found in all social classes worldwide, from upper wealthy to lower poor disadvantage backgrounds, and from high profiled individuals to ordinary unknown people. They have long integrated into the native communities living their lives as ordinary citizens. However most of the successful individuals are present in economics and business sectors in the Philippines and a few sources estimate companies which comprise a significant portion of the Philippine economy like Ynchausti y Compañia, MBC Media Group, Ayala Corporation (Ayala Land, Bank of the Philippine Islands, Globe Telecom, Integrated Micro-Electronics, Inc.), Aboitiz & Company, (Aboitiz Power, Union Bank of the Philippines), ANSCOR (Amanpulo), Razon & Co. Inc. (International Container Terminal Services Inc., Manila Water, Solaire Resort & Casino, Apex Mining Co., Inc.) and Central Azucarera de La Carlota, to name but a few are owned by Hispanic Filipinos.

== History ==
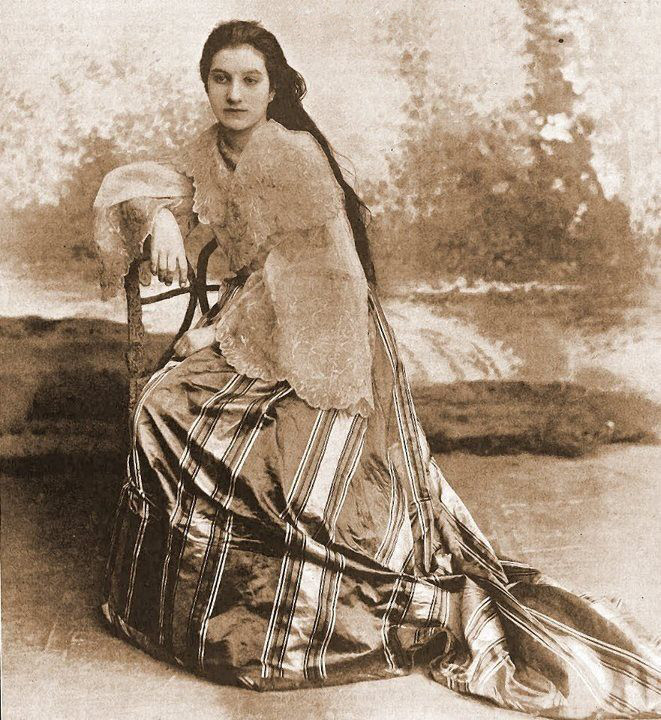
A "Criollo (Insular)" woman in Hispanized Philippine dress (ca. 1890s)

The history of the Spanish Philippines covers the period from 1521 to 1898, beginning with the arrival in 1521 of the Portuguese explorer Ferdinand Magellan sailing for Spain, which heralded the period when the Philippines was an overseas province of Spain, and ends with the outbreak of the Spanish–American War in 1898.

The Spanish discovery of the American continent by the Italian explorer Christopher Columbus in 1492, an expedition sponsored by Queen Isabella I of Castille and King Ferdinand II of Aragon, laid the foundation of settlements and explorations in the New World. Spain became the first European country to permanently colonized the American continent in 1492.

In 1541, Spanish explorer Ruy López de Villalobos was commissioned by Antonio de Mendoza, the viceroy of New Spain and first colonial administrator in the New World, to send an expedition to the Philippines to establish a larger Spanish presence there as a base for trade with the Spice Islands and China and to extend Spanish control over the Moluccas in the Portuguese East Indies. The expedition ultimately failed, with Villalobos dying in a Portuguese prison on Ambon Island in 1546.

In 1564, conquistadors led by Miguel López de Legazpi, prompted the colonization of the Philippine Islands that lasted for 333 years. The Philippines was a former territory of New Spain until the grant of independence to Mexico in 1821 necessitated the direct government from Spain of the Philippines from that year. Early Spanish settlers to the Philippines were mostly explorers, soldiers, government officials, religious missionaries, and among others, who were born in Spain or in Mexico called "Peninsulares" (Spanish migrants living in the colony). Their succeeding generation known as "Criollos" (Spaniards of pure White blood, born and raised in the colony) contributed to the population's development.

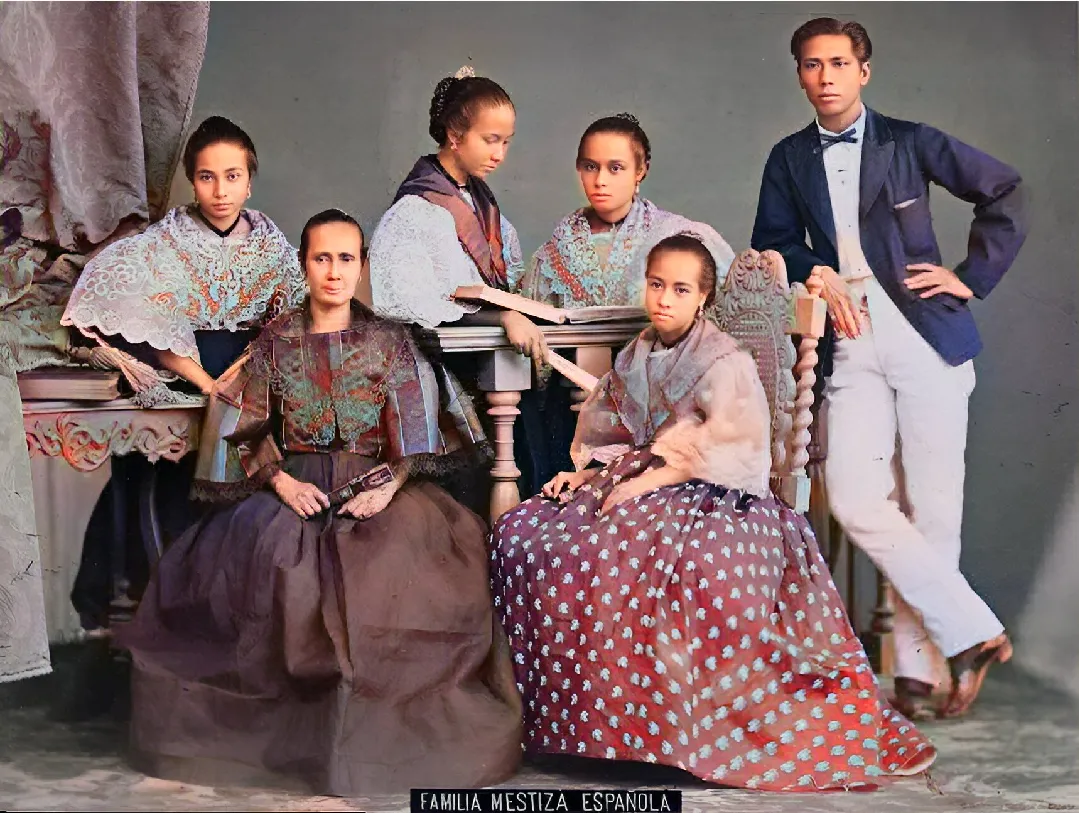
"Mestizo" family

For centuries several hundreds of Spaniards settled in the islands along with their families to start a new beginning in the New World, to take advantage of the rich and exotic resources the colony had to offer. Some of these individuals married or inter-bred with the indigenous Filipino population while most married only other Spaniards. Their descendants consisting of "Criollos" or "Insulares" and "Mestizos" (those of "mixed-blood" individuals) became part of the island's indigenous society; some became town officers and farmers, and others became ordinary citizens.

Government officials and those of high ranks were granted with haciendas (plantation estates) by the Spanish government. In some provinces like, Vigan, Iloilo, Cebu, Pampanga, and Zamboanga, The Spanish government encouraged foreign merchants from Southeast Asia and the Asian continent to trade in the colony, along with the European and indigenous population, but they were not given certain privileges such as ownership of land.

Contacts with Europeans, social intercourse between foreign merchants, and indigenous people resulted in a new ethnic group. These groups were called Mestizos (mixed-race individuals), who were born from intermarriages from European Spaniards and indigenous Austronesian-speaking Filipino natives. Some of their descendants emerged later as an influential part of the ruling class called the "Principalía" (Nobility) class.

The Spanish implemented incentives to deliberately entangle the various races together in order to stop rebellions. According to a historical colonial conversation that was published, stated by a government official explains: "It is needful to encourage public instruction in all ways possible, permit newspapers subject to a liberal censure, to establish in Manila a college of medicine, surgery, and pharmacy: in order to break down the barriers that divide the races, and amalgamate them all into one. For that purpose, the Spaniards of the country, the Chinese mestizos, and the Filipinos shall be admitted with perfect equality as cadets of the military corps; the personal-service tax shall be abolished, or an equal and general tax shall be imposed, to which all the Spaniards shall be subject. This last plan appears to me more advisable, as the poll-tax is already established, and it is not opportune to make a trial of new taxes when it is a question of allowing the country to be governed by itself. Since the annual tribute is unequal, the average shall be taken and shall be fixed, consequently, at fifteen or sixteen reals per whole tribute, or perhaps one peso fuerte annually from each adult tributary person. This regulation will produce an increase in the revenue of 200,000 or 300,000 pesos fuertes, and this sum shall be set aside to give the impulse for the amalgamation of the races, favoring crossed marriages by means of dowries granted to the single women in the following manner. To a Chinese mestizo woman who marries a Filipino shall be given 100 pesos; to a Filipino woman who marries a Chinese mestizo, 100 pesos; to a Chinese mestizo woman who marries a Spaniard, 1,000 pesos; to a Spanish woman who marries a Chinese mestizo, 2,000 pesos; to a Filipino woman who marries a Spaniard, 2,000 pesos; to a Spanish woman who marries a Filipino chief, 3,000 or 4,000 pesos. Some mestizo and Filipino alcaldes-mayor of the provinces shall be appointed. It shall be ordered that when a Filipino chief goes to the house of a Spaniard, he shall seat himself as the latter's equal. In a word, by these and other means, the idea that they and the Castilians are two kinds of distinct races shall be erased from the minds of the natives, and the families shall become related by marriage in such manner that when free of the Castilian dominion should any exalted Filipinos try to expel or enslave our race, they would find it so interlaced with their own that their plan would be practically impossible".

Filipinos and other Asians were brought to Mexico as slaves and servants, while some Africans were brought to the Philippines by the Portuguese traders, to work on plantation settlements as slave workers or settlers working in the colony. Between 1565 and 1815, both Filipinos and people from Latin America and Spain sailed to, and from the Philippines in the Manila galleon trade to Acapulco, assisting Spain in its trade on the colony.

== Population ==
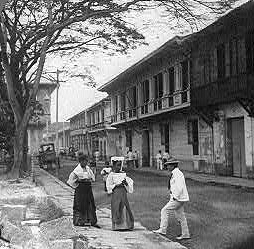
Hispanic Indigenous Filipinos in Cabildo Street, inside the walled city of Intramuros, Manila in 1890.

=== Colonial statistics ===
==== Joaquín Martínez de Zúñiga Census ====
In the late 1700s to early 1800s, Joaquín Martínez de Zúñiga, an Agustinian Friar from Spain, in his Two Volume Book: "Estadismo de las islas Filipinas" compiled a census of the Spanish-Philippines based on the tribute counts (Which represented an average family of seven to ten children and two parents, per tribute) and came upon the following statistics:

Data reported for the 1800 as divided by ethnicity and province
Province	Native Tributes	Spanish Mestizo Tributes	All Tributes (Note: Including others such as Latin-Americans and Chinese-Mestizos, pure Chinese paid tribute but were not Philippine citizens as they were transients who returned to China, and Spaniards were exempt)
Tondo	14,537-1/2	3,528	27,897-7
Cavite	5,724-1/2	859	9,132-4
Laguna	14,392-1/2	336	19,448-6
Batangas	15,014	451	21,579-7
Mindoro	3,165	3-1/2	4,000-8
Bulacan	16,586-1/2	2,007	25,760-5
Pampanga	16,604-1/2	2,641	27,358-1
Bataan	3,082	619	5,433
Zambales	1,136	73	4,389
Ilocos	44,852-1/2	631	68,856
Pangasinan	19,836	719-1/2	25,366
Cagayan	9,888	0	11,244-6
Camarines	19,686-1/2	154-1/2	24,994
Albay	12,339	146	16,093
Tayabas	7,396	12	9,228
Cebu	28,112-1/2	625	28,863
Samar	3,042	103	4,060
Leyte	7,678	37-1/2	10,011
Caraga	3,497	0	4,977
Misamis	1,278	0	1,674
Negros Island	5,741	0	7,176
Iloilo	29,723	166	37,760
Capiz	11,459	89	14,867
Antique	9,228	0	11,620
Calamianes	2,289	0	3,161
TOTAL	299,049	13,201	424,992-16

The Spanish-Filipino population as a proportion of the provinces widely varied; with as high as 19% of the population of Tondo province (The most populous province and former name of Manila), to Pampanga 13.7%, Cavite at 13%, Laguna 2.28%, Batangas 3%, Bulacan 10.79%, Bataan 16.72%, Ilocos 1.38%, Pangasinan 3.49%, Albay 1.16%, Cebu 2.17%, Samar 3.27%, Iloilo 1%, Capiz 1%, Bicol 20%, and Zamboanga 40%. According to the 1893 data in the Archdiocese of Manila which administers much of Luzon under it, about 10% of the population was then Spanish-Filipino. Overall the whole Philippines, even including the provinces with no Spanish settlement, as summed up, (Note: (299,049 pure native tributes plus 13,201 Spanish Mestizo Tributes amounting to a total of 312,250 tributes with the 13,201 Spanish Mestizo tributes being 4.22% of the total tributes)) the average percentage of Spanish Filipino tributes amount to an estimated 5% of the total population.

==== Manuel Buzeta and Felipe Bravo Census ====
The previously cited census record, summing up the tributes from the late 1700s, is also corroborated by another census finished in year 1818, also headed by clergy, this time by the two Priest-Scientists, Fr. Manuel Buzeta and Fr. Felipe Bravo, concluded that there were 1,522,221 souls represented by 312,251 tributes or families across the islands. Within which; 400 tributes representing the pure Spanish showing the same number of pure Spanish families; 8,584 Spanish-mestizo tributes representing the same number of Spanish-mestizo families; and 9,901 Chinese-mestizo tributes representing the same number of Chinese-mestizo families. If calculating for the family size of a tribute which is 1 tribute to 9 persons in a family. "1:9" (1 Father and 8 Children as per the average number of children in the census, and disregarding the race of the mother that legally follows that of the husband upon marriage) 8,584 Spanish-mestizo tributes plus 400 pure Spanish tributes sum up to 8,984 Spanish-blooded tributes and when multiplied by 9 result to 71,872 Spanish-blooded citizens which is about 4.72% of the 1,522,221 living in the Spanish-Philippines, similar to 5% ratio stated in the earlier census by Joaquín Martínez de Zúñiga.

As outlined below are the primary statistics of the said census.

Felipe Bravo Census Demographics (Albay, 1818)
Provinces	Pueblos	Native Families	Spanish Filipino Families	Negrito Families	Chinese Filipino Families
Albay	Albay, Cabicera	5,515		2	2
	Manito	240	4		
	Bacon	2,119	45		
	Cuba	2,162	52		
	Casiguran	1,025	28		
	Juban	396	18		
	Sorsogon	1,783	149		
	Bulusan	1,777	19		
	Bulan	714	16		
	Donsol	241			
	Quipia	269			
	Lilog	821	33	23	
	Bacacay	1,295	77		
	Malilipot	981	53		
	Tabaco	3,347	225		
	Malitao	2,844	241		
	Tibi	2,069	157	110	
	Lagonoy y su anejo	1,669	18	521	
	San Jose	1,829	114	470	
	Caramoan	641		72	
Total		31,737	1,249	1,198	2

Felipe Bravo Census Demographics (Isla De Ticao, 1818)
Provinces	Pueblos	Native Families	Spanish Filipino Families	Negrito Families	Chinese Filipino Families
Isla de Ticao	San Jacinto	266	8		
Total		266	8		

Felipe Bravo Census Demographics (Isla De Masbate, 1818)
Provinces	Pueblos	Native Families	Spanish Filipino Families	Negrito Families	Chinese Filipino Families
Isla de Masbate	Mobo	912	1		
Total		912	1		

Felipe Bravo Census Demographics (Isla De Catanduanes, 1818)
Provinces	Pueblos	Native Families	Spanish Filipino Families	Negrito Families	Chinese Filipino Families
Isla De Catanduanes	Virac	1,581	91		
	Calolbon	847	3		
	Eiga	847	3		
	Payo y sus anejos Bagamanoc y Ooc	644	17		
	Pandan y Caramoan	489	2		
Total		4,408	116		

Felipe Bravo Census Demographics (Antique, 1818)
Provinces	Pueblos	Native Families	Spanish Filipino Families	Chinese Filipino Families
Antique	San José de Buenavista, cabecera	5,925	6	
	San Pedro de Balbalan	2,247		
	Sibalom	4,665	2	
	Patnongon y su visita Coritan	2,097	3	
	Bugason	3,060	1	
	San Antonio de Nalupa, su anejo Culari y visitas Tibiao, Bitad, Tun, Bacafan y Batunan	2,542	19	
	Pandan	300		
	Antique	2,304	12	
	Dao	1,296	7	
	Cagayan Chico en la isla del mismo nombre	527		
Total	(Across the Province)	24,963	50	40

Felipe Bravo Census Demographics (Bataan, 1818)
Provinces	Pueblos	Native Families	Spanish Filipino Families	Moreno Filipino Families	Negro (Black) Filipino Families	Chinese Filipino Families
Bataan	Balanga, cabecera	1,608	12		18	8
	Abucay	1,406	20		3	5
	Samar	1,000	4		1	
	Orani	1,000	25			8
	Llana-Hermosa	716	1			
	San Juan de Dinalupijan	451	19		7	3
	Pilar	899				
	Mariveles y su visita Morong	1,522	3	1	5	
	Orion ú Odiong	1,550	8	2	18	3
Total		10,152	92	3	52	27

Felipe Bravo Census Demographics (Batangas, 1818)
Provinces	Pueblos	Native Families	Spanish Filipino Families	Chinese Filipino Families
Batangas	Balayan, cabecera.	4,521	22	
	Lian.	629	7	
	Nasugbů.	866		2
	Rosario	1,758	4	
	Santo Tomas.	1,256		
	San Pablo de los Montes	1,948	7	
	Taal	8,312		
	Baoan ó Banang	5,813		
	Batangas	6,889		
	San José	2,427		
	Tanauan.	2,106		
	Lipa	4,104		
Total		40,629	40	2

Felipe Bravo Census Demographics (Bulacan, 1818)
Provinces	Pueblos	Native Families	Spanish Filipino Families	Converted Negro Families	Chinese Filipino Families
Bulacan	Bulacan, cabecera.	5,200			
	Bigáa.	1,876			
	Guiguinto.	1,291			
	Malolos.	8,110			
	Paombon.	1,058			
	Hagonoy.	4,572			
	Calumpít.	2,628			
	Quingua.	2,912			
	San Isidro.	2,560			
	Baliuag.	4,296			
	San Rafael.	1,650	10		
	Angat.	5,441			
	San José.	219			
	Santa María de Pandi.	1,588	17		
	Bocaue.	2,550	88		2
	Marilao.	881	28	5	1
	Meycauayan.	2,375	46		
	Polo.	3,160	44		4
	Obando.	2,493			
Total		54,360	233	5	7

Felipe Bravo Census Demographics (Cagayan, 1818)
Province	Pueblo	Native Families	Spanish Filipino Families
Cagayan	Lal-lo, cabecera.	975	313
	Camalaniugan.	1,156	
	Piat y su visita.	899	
	Tabang..	201	
	Cabagan.	3,543	
	Malaveg con su visita Mabanaug.	524	
	Tuao..	1,393	
	Iguig y su visita Amulong.	403	
	Tuguegarao.	5,072	
	Aparri..	1,715	
	Abulug.	1,162	1
	San Juan y su visita Masi.	913	
	Nasiping y su visita Gataran.	573	
	Ilagan..	1,150	
	Gamú y su visita Furao.	586	16
	Tumauini.	827	
	Bugay..	299	
	Aritao..	580	
	Dupax.	867	6
	Bambang..	893	
	Bayombong.	771	
	Lumabang.	332	
	Bagabag y su Fuerza.	508	
	Carig y su Fortaleza el Sto. Niño.	305	
	Camarag.	488	
	Angadanan.	320	
	Cauayan.	318	
	Calaniugan.	135	
TOTAL		26,726	336

Felipe Bravo Census Demographics (Calamianes, 1818)
Province	Pueblo	Native Families	Spanish Filipino Families
Islas de Calamianes
Calamianes	Culion en la de Calamianes, Isla de Linacapan, e Isla de Coron.	1,044	2
Isla de Paragua
	Taytay, Silanga, Meitejet, Pancol, Guinlo, y Barbacan.	1,424	4
Islas de Dumaran y Agutay
	Isla y pueblo de Dumaran e Isla y pueblo de Agutay.	632	
Islas de Cuyo
	Isla y pueblo de Cuyo y su anejo, Canipo, e Isla de Pagaguayan.	2,430	25
TOTAL		5,530	31

Felipe Bravo Census Demographics (Camarines, 1818)
Province	Pueblo	Native Families	Spanish Filipino Families	Lacandula Families	Negro Filipinos	Chinese Filipinos
Partido de Vicol (Ciudad de Nueva-Caceres)
Camarines	Tabaco y Santa Cruz.	3,593	301		4	3
	Naga.	956				
	Camaligan.	1,388				
	Canaman.	1,589				
	Magarao ó Mangarao.	1,862				
	Bombom ó Bonbon.	1,245				
	Quipayo.	784				
	Calabanga.	1,174				
	Libmanan ó Libnanan.	1,490	1			
	Milaor.	1,902	7			
	San Fernando.	688	2			
	Minalabag.	901				
Partido de la Rinconada
	Bula.	471				
	Bao ó Baao.	1,538	37		4	
	Nabua.	2,612	2		2	
	Iriga.	2,040	1			
	Buhi ó Buji.	1,979	10			
	Bato.	495				
Partido de la Iriga
	Libon.	410	4			
	Polangui.	2,903	15			
	Ors ú Oas.	3,614				
	Ligao.	2,968	24			
	Guinobatan.	2,605	1			
	Camalig.	2,330	39		9	
	Cagsava.	2,870				
Monte Isaroc
	Pueblo y Mision de Manguirin.	160			629	
	Goa, Tigabon y Tinambag.	1,123		2	625	
Partido de la Contra-Costa
	Sipocot, Lupi y Ragay.	406				
	Daet.	1,449	26		10	
	Talisay.	1,055	2			
	Indan.	675	6			
	Paracale.	697	34			
	Mambulao.	950				
	Capalonga.	137			4	
TOTAL		50,762	512	2	1,287	3

Felipe Bravo Census Demographics (Capiz, 1818)
Province	Pueblo	Native Families	Spanish Filipino Families	Lacandula Families	Negro Filipino families	Chinese Filipino families
Capiz	Capiz y su visita Ibisan.	2,650				
	Panay.	2,275				
	Panitan.	1,485				
	Dumalag y sus visitas Dao y Tapas.	3,158				
	Dumarao.	2,600				
	Mambusao y sus visitas Sigma y Jamindan.	1,924	13			
	Batan y su visita Sapiang.	2,255	56			
	Banga y su visita Madalag.	1,579	8			
	Malinao.	1,487	11			
	Calibo y su visita Macao.	2,700	167			
	Ibajay.	1,268	30			
Isla de Romblon
	Romblon.	1,514	15			
Isla de Sibuyan
	Cauit, Pagalar, y Cajidiocan.	1,114				
Isla de Banton
	Banton.					
Isla de Tablas
	Guintinguian, Aghagacay, Odiongan, Lanan, y Loog.					
Isla de Simara
	San José, Coloncolon.					
Isla del Maestre de Campo
	Sibali.					
TOTAL		26,009	285			

Felipe Bravo Census Demographics (Caraga, 1818)
Province	Pueblo	Native Families	Spanish Filipino Families	Lacandula Families	Negro Filipino families	Chinese Filipino families
Distrito de Surigao y Siargao
Caraga	Surigao (cabecera), Tagauan, Gigaquit ó Higaguit, Cabubungan, Isla y pueblo de Dinagat, Caco en la isla de Siargao, Dapa en dicha isla, Cabuntug en la misma isla, Sapao en la citada isla.	2,475	25			
Distrito de Butuan y Talacogon
	Butuan, Habungan, Tabay, Maynio, Talacogon.	1,593	10			
Distrito de Cantilan y Mision de San Juan
	Lutao, Hingoog, Cantilan, Tago, Tandac, Lianga y la Mision de San Juan.	1,155				
Distrito de Bislic y Mision de Caraga
	Jinatuan, Bislic, Catel, Bagangan y la Mision de Caraga.	955				
TOTAL		6,178	35			

Felipe Bravo Census Demographics (Cavite, 1818)
Province	Pueblo	Native Families	Spanish Filipino Families	Lacandula Families	Negro Filipino families	Morenos	Chinese Filipino families
Cavite	Plaza y puerto de Cavite.	221	153			5	100
	San Roque.	3,906	443			3	35
	Cavite viejo.	1,855	55				4
	Bacood ó Bacor.	1,729	19				4
	San Francisco de Malabon.	1,510	69				3
	Santa Cruz de Malabon.	2,090	3			1	2
	Pueblo y Hacienda de Nait.	942	3			4	2
	Marigondon.	2,043					3
	Indan.	2,759	36				2
	Silang.	2,255	6			1	4
	Imus.	2,015	125				5
TOTAL		21,325	912			14	164

Felipe Bravo Census Demographics (Cebu, 1818)
Province	Pueblo	Native Families	Spanish Filipino Families	Lacandula Families	Negro Filipino families	Chinese Filipino families
Isla de Cebu
Cebu	Cabecera, El Sto. Nombre de Jesus.	868	255			
	Parian, Yutaos y Sogod con la visita de este, Simugui.	1,795	109			
	San Nicolás y sus visits Talisay, Lipata, Tansan, y Pitao.	2,420				
	Opon y Talamban.	2,850				
	Mandave ó Mandaui.	2,729	20			
	Danao y Catmon.	2,656	57			
	Barili y sus visitas Duman, Jod, Malhual, Coston, Badian y Taiuran.	1,943	14			
	Samboan y sus visitas Jiratilan, Malabuyot, y Taburan.	2,496	69			
	Bolojon y sus visitas Tayon, Calob, Mambuji y Yunan.	2,420				
	Dalaguete.	2,556				
	Argao y Carcar.	3,250				
Isla de Bantayan
	Bantayan y sus visitas Octon y Davis, Daan, Bantayan y sus visits Sogod y Cavit.	2,169	75			
Isla de Siquijor
	Siquijor y su visita Canoan.	2,450	46			
Isla de Bohol
	Inabangan y sus visitas Pampan, Corte, Taoran, Canogon, Tubigon, Ipil, Talibon, Tabigui, Inbay, y Cabulao.	1,815	41			
	Gindulman y sus visitas Quimale y Cugton.	1,500	6			
	Jagna.	3,255				
	Dimiao.	2,016				
	Loay.	1,614	5			
	Lobog y su anejo S. Isidro.	3,852				
	Baclayon.	3,549	5			
	Tagbilaran.	2,370	2			
	Pimin-vitan.	1,414				
	Malabohoo.	2,269				
	Loon y su visita Catarbacan.	1,990				
	Calape y sus visitas Bintig y Mondoog.	1,932				
Isla de Davis
	Davis.	2,055	9			
	Panglao.	1,350				
Isla de Camotes
	Poro y sus visitas (administración de Mandave).					
TOTAL		60,305	638			

Felipe Bravo Census Demographics (Ilocos Norte, 1818)
Province	Pueblo	Native Families	Spanish Filipino Families	Lacandula Families	Negro Filipino families	Chinese Filipino families
Ilocos Norte	Bangui.	1,449	5			
	Nagpartian.	423				
	Pasuquin.	1,530				
	Bacarra.	4,901				
	Vintar.	2,064				
	Sarrat ó San Miguel de Cuning.	2,755				
	Pigdig y su visita Santiago.	4,015				
	Dingras.	4,559				
	Laoag.	12,055				
	San Nicolás.	3,498				
	Batac.	7,026				
	Paoay.	7,447				
	Badoc.	3,356				
TOTAL		55,078	5			

Felipe Bravo Census Demographics (Ilocos Sur, 1818)
Province	Pueblo	Native Families	Spanish Filipino Families	Lacandula Families	Negro Filipino families	Chinese Filipino families
Ilocos Sur	Sinait.	2,625				
	Cabugao.	3,595				
	Lapoc.	1,791				
	Masingal.	2,740				
	Bantay y su visita San Ildefonso.	5,535				
	Santo Domingo.	2,912	36			
	San Vicente Ferrer.	2,113	10			
	Santa Catalina.	4,292				
	Vigan.	6,849	421			14
	Santa Catalina V. y M.	1,750				
	Narvacan.	4,185				
	Santa Maria.	2,985				
	San Esteban.	819				
	Santiago.	1,023				
	Candong.	5,709				
	Santa Lucia y su visita Santa Cruz con la mision de Ronda.	3,690				
	Tagudin y Ous.	2,620				
	Mision llamada Sevilla.					
	Mision de Argaguinan.					
	Bangas y sus misiones.	2,582				
	Villa-Cruz y San Rafael.					
	Namacpacan.	2,564				
	Balaoan.	2,703				
Distrito del Abra
	Tayum en el Abra.	1,307	4			
	Bangued en idem.	1,836	9			
TOTAL		61,397	530			14

Felipe Bravo Census Demographics (Iloilo, 1818)
Province	Pueblo	Native Families	Spanish Filipino Families	Lacandula Families	Negro Filipino families	Chinese Filipino families
Iloilo	Iloilo (cabecera) y Guimaras.	1,594	103			
	Molo.	3,457	23			
	Mandurrio.	5,966				
	Barotac, Asuy y Batag.	1,200				
	Ooton.	5,395				
	Tigbauan.	3,248				
	Guimbal y Tabungan.	4,209				
	Miagao.	4,096				
	San Joaquin.	1,180				
	Igbaras.	3,329				
	Camando.	1,974				
	Alimodian y San Miguel.	4,230				
	Ma-asin.	2,880				
	Cabatuan.	6,470				
	Xaro.	6,871				
	Santa Bárbara.	3,600				
	Janiuay.	4,158				
	Lambuso.	1,040				
	Calinog.	960				
	Pasi y Abaca.	2,637				
	Laglag y Diale.	2,252				
	Pototan.	3,000				
	Dumangas, Anilao, Banate y Barotac.	3,200				
TOTALS		77,862	126			

Felipe Bravo Census Demographics (Laguna, 1818)
Province	Pueblo	Native Families	Spanish Filipino Families	Lacandula Families	Negro Filipino families	Morenos	Chinese Filipino families
Laguna	Pagsanjan, cabecera.	4,785	7				
	Lumban.	1,983					
	Paete.	1,088					
	Longos con su anejo San Antonio del Monte.	944					
	Paquil.	628					
	Panguil.	1,030					
	Siniloan.	1,911					
	Mavitac.	525					
	Santa Maria Caboan.	257					
	Cavioli.	854					
	Majayjay.	4,948					
	Lilio.	2,168					
	Nagcarlan.	2,557					
	Santa Cruz.	2,528					
	Bay.	668					
	Pueblo y hacienda de Calauang.	610	2				
	Pila.	1,117	3				
	Los Baños.	460					5
	Calamba.	959	4				15
	Cabuyao.	1,755			1		14
	Santa Rosa.	1,760					9
	Biñan.	2,598	8		2	2	
	San Pedro Tunasau.	1,112	2			1	
	Pililla.	1,096					
	Tanay.	1,352					
	Binangonan de Bay.	1,234					
	Moron.	1,747					
	Baras.	486	3				
	Pueblo y hacienda de Angono.	513	2		2	3	
TOTAL		40,239	34		5	6	41

Felipe Bravo Census Demographics (Leyte, 1818)
Province	Pueblo	Native Families	Spanish Filipino Families	Lacandula Families	Negro Filipino families	Chinese Filipino families
Leyte	Taclovan (cabecera) y Palo.	2,290	11			
	Tanauan.	2,155	29			
	Dulag y Abuyog.	2,229	14			
	Barayuen, Haro y Alang-alang.	864				
	Barugo y San Miguel.	626				
	Carigara y su visita Leyte.	2,253				
	Palompon, Ogmug y Baybay.	826				
	Hilongos, Bato, Matalom, y Cajanguaan.	1,231	2			
	Indan, Dagami, e Isla de Panamao.	1,978				
Islas de Biliran y Maripipi
	Biliran, Isla de Maripipi, y Maripipi.	538				
Isla de Panahon y Costa Sur
	Isla de Panahon, Ma-asin, Sogod, Cabalian, y Liloan.	1,450				
TOTALES		16,244	56			

Felipe Bravo Census Demographics (Mariana Islands, 1818)
Provinces	Pueblos	Native Citizens	Spanish Citizen
Marianas Islands	(Across the Province in General)	7,555	160

Felipe Bravo Census Demographics (Mindoro, 1818)
Province	Pueblo	Number of Native Families	Number of Spanish Filipino Families	Lacandula Families	Negro Filipino families	Morenos	Chinese Filipino families
Mindoro	Calapan (cabecera) y sus anejos Baco, Sabuan, Abra de Ilog y Dongon.	970	8				
	Naujan y sus anejos Pola, Pinamalayan, Mamalay, Manaol, Bulalacao, Bongabon, Manjao, Manguirin y la Isla de Ilin.	924	6				
Isla de Marinduque
	Santa Cruz de Napo.	1,600	1				
	Boac.	1,908	31		4		
	Gazan.	316	1		1		
Isla de Luban
	Luban.	1,699					
TOTAL		7,455	47		5		

Felipe Bravo Census Demographics (Misamis)
Province	Pueblo	Number of Native Families	Number of Spanish Filipino Families	Lacandula Families	Negro Filipino families	Morenos	Chinese Filipino families
Partido de Misamis
Misamis	Plaza y presidio de Misamis, y su anejo Loculan.	334					
	Presidio de Iligan, con su anejo Initao.	169					
Partido de Dapitan
	Dapitan, y su visita San Lorenzo de Ilaya.	666	2				
	Lobungan, y sus visitas Dipolog, Piao, Dohinog, y Dicayo.	701					
Partido de Cagayan
	Cagayan, y sus visitas Iponau, Mulingan, Agusan, Cagaloan, Lasaan, Balingasay, Salay, Quinoquitan ó Bacay, Mubijut, y la Mision de Pinangudan.	3,177	1				
Isla de Camiguin (Partido de Catarman)
	Catarman, y sus visitas Mambujao, Guinsiliban, y Sagay.	1,693	35				
TOTAL		6,740	38				

Felipe Bravo Census Demographics (Samar, 1818)
Provinces	Pueblos	Native Families	Spanish Filipino Families	Negrito Families	Chinese Filipino Families
Samar	Samar island, in general.	16,671	174		

Felipe Bravo Census Demographics (Zamboanga, 1818)
Provinces	Pueblos	Native Citizens	Spanish Filipino Soldiers	Kapampangan Soldiers	Spanish and Mexican Citizens
Zamboanga	Zamboanga-province and peninsula .	8,640	300	100	A very large but unknown amount of the civilian population, they are mostly employed in the navy and shipping.

=== Anthropology ===
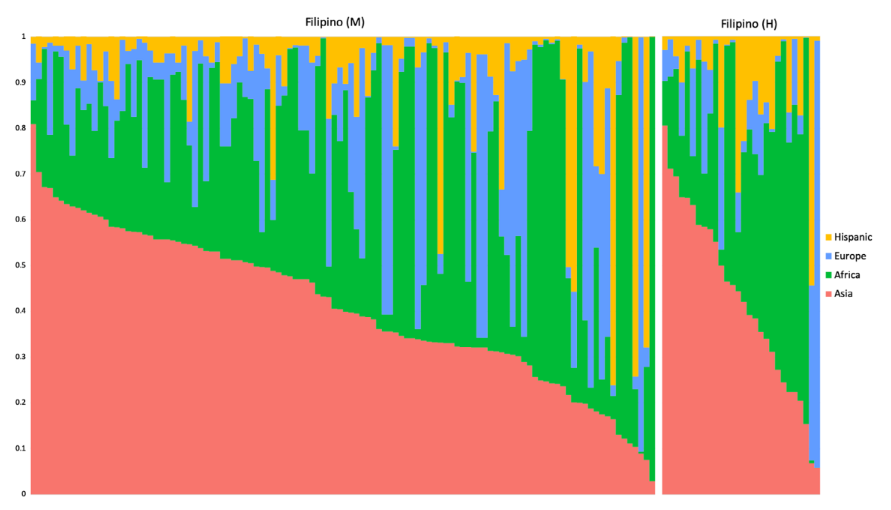
A Craniometric Racial Graph of Filipinos (using Historical samples and Modern samples) by Matthew C. Go. Structure map showing estimated ancestry proportions for the historical (H) and modern (M) Filipino populations when shown using the posterior group membership probability for reference pools that are Hispanic, Asian, European, and African. Every person is symbolized by a single vertical line divided into four segments of varying colors, each of which represents the estimated ancestry elements. The posterior probability value is the length of the colored section. The people are arranged in decreasing order according to their amount of estimated Asian heritage.

A 2018-2020 Census research data shows that it may be incomplete as there was a large span of time ever since racial statistics were recorded in Spanish censuses and the new Philippine censuses does not account for racial differences, thereby ignoring foreign ancestry that has been compounding in time. To address this, scientists have undergone Anthropology studies of Filipinos to measure ethnic ratios in the population. Scientist, Matthew C. Go, in a Trihybrid Ancestry Variation Analysis approach to Admixture in Filipinos, published a study wherein it was discovered that upon exhuming the remains around the public cemetery of the "Manila North Cemetery" as well as other public cemeteries across the Philippines, and practicing forensic anthropology on them, Matthew C. Go estimated that 71% of the mean amount, among the samples exhumed, have attribution to Asian descent while 7% is attributable to European descent. Filipinos have significantly less Asian ancestry compared to other Asian nationalities like the Koreans who are 90% Asian, Japanese at 96%, Thai at 93%, and Vietnamese at 84%.

Nevertheless, a 2019 Anthropology Study by Beatrix Dudzik, while using skeletons collated by the University of the Philippines and sampled from all across the Philippines, thus published in the Journal of Human Biology, using physical anthropology, estimated that, 72.7% of Filipinos are Asian, 12.7% of Filipinos can be classified as Hispanic, 7.3% as Indigenous American, African at 4.5% and European at 2.7%. However, this is only according to an interpretation of the data wherein the reference groups, which were attributed to the Filipino samples; for the Hispanic category, were Mexican-Americans, and the reference groups for the European, African, and Indigenous American, categories, were: White Americans, Black Americans, and Native Americans from the USA, while the Asian reference groups were sourced from Chinese, Japanese, and Vietnamese origins.

In contrast, a different anthropology study using Morphoscopic ancestry estimates in Filipino crania using multivariate probit regression models by J. T. Hefner, published on year 2020, while analyzing Historic and Modern samples of skeletons in the Philippines, paint a different picture, in that, when the reference group for "Asian" was Thailand (Southeast Asians) rather than Chinese, Japanese, and Vietnamese; and the reference group for "Hispanic" were Colombians (South Americans) rather than Mexicans, the combined historical and modern sample results for Filipinos, yielded the following ratios: Asian at 48.6%, African at 32.9%, and only a small portion classifying as either European at 12.9%, and finally for Hispanic at 5.7%.

=== Historical terms ===
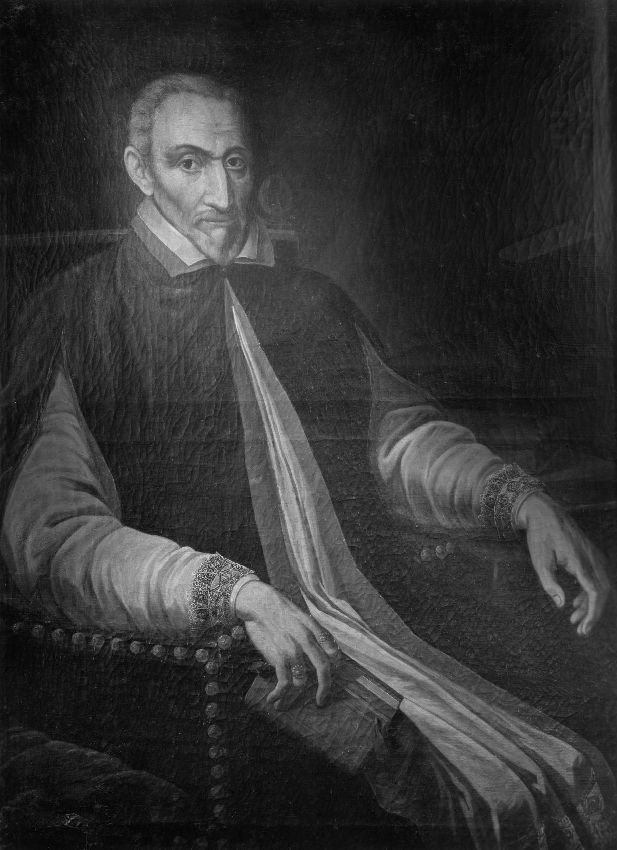
Gaspar de la Torre y Ayala, the Governor-General of the Philippines was a "Peninsulares" Filipino.

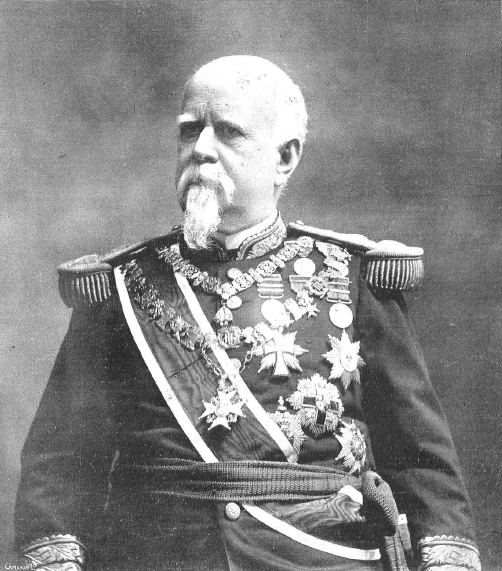
Marcelo Azcárraga, former Prime Minister of Spain was a "Criollo (Insulares)" Filipino.

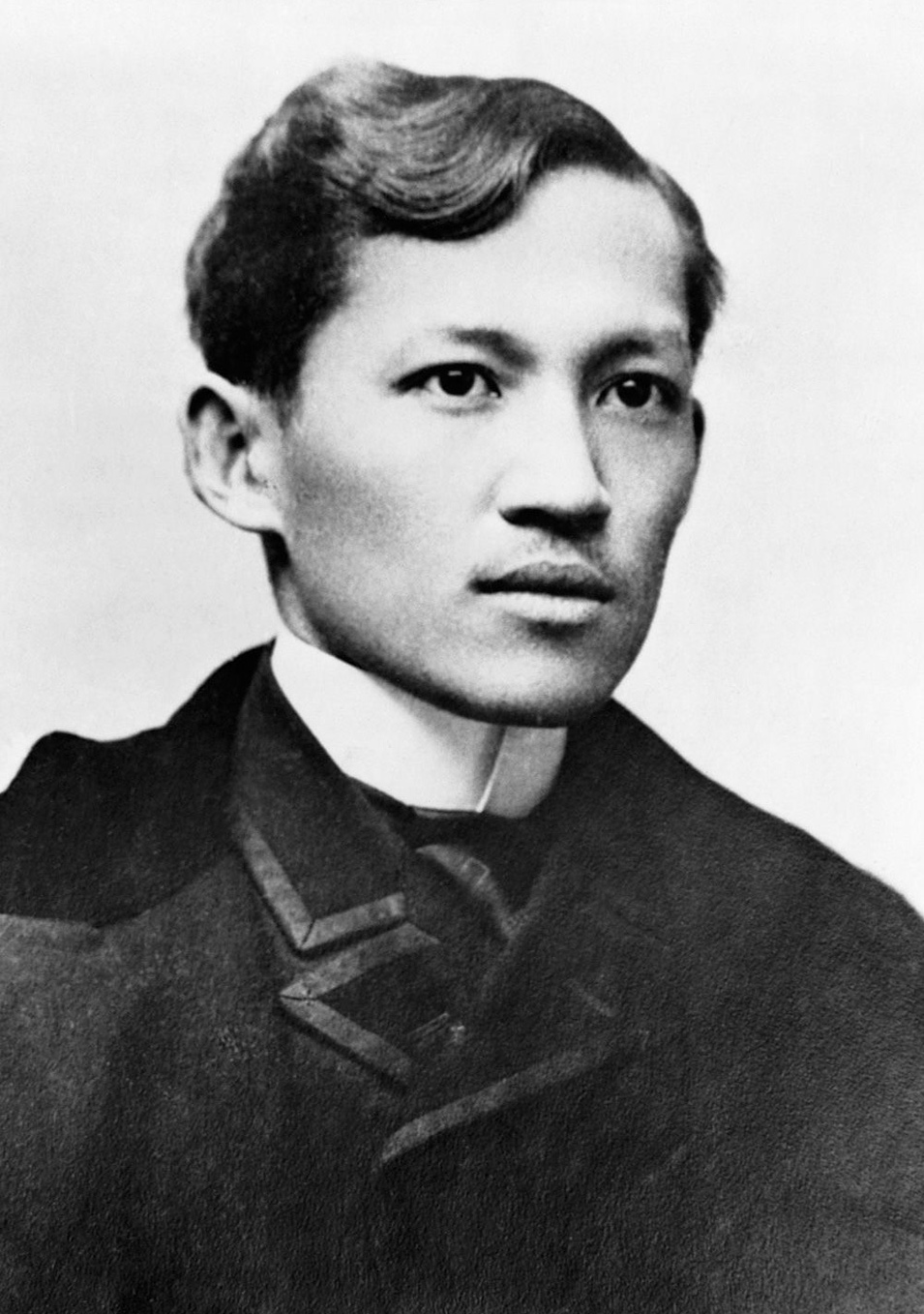
Prominent Philippine political figure, José Rizal was a Filipino "Torna atrás" of mixed indigenous, Spanish and East Asian ancestry.

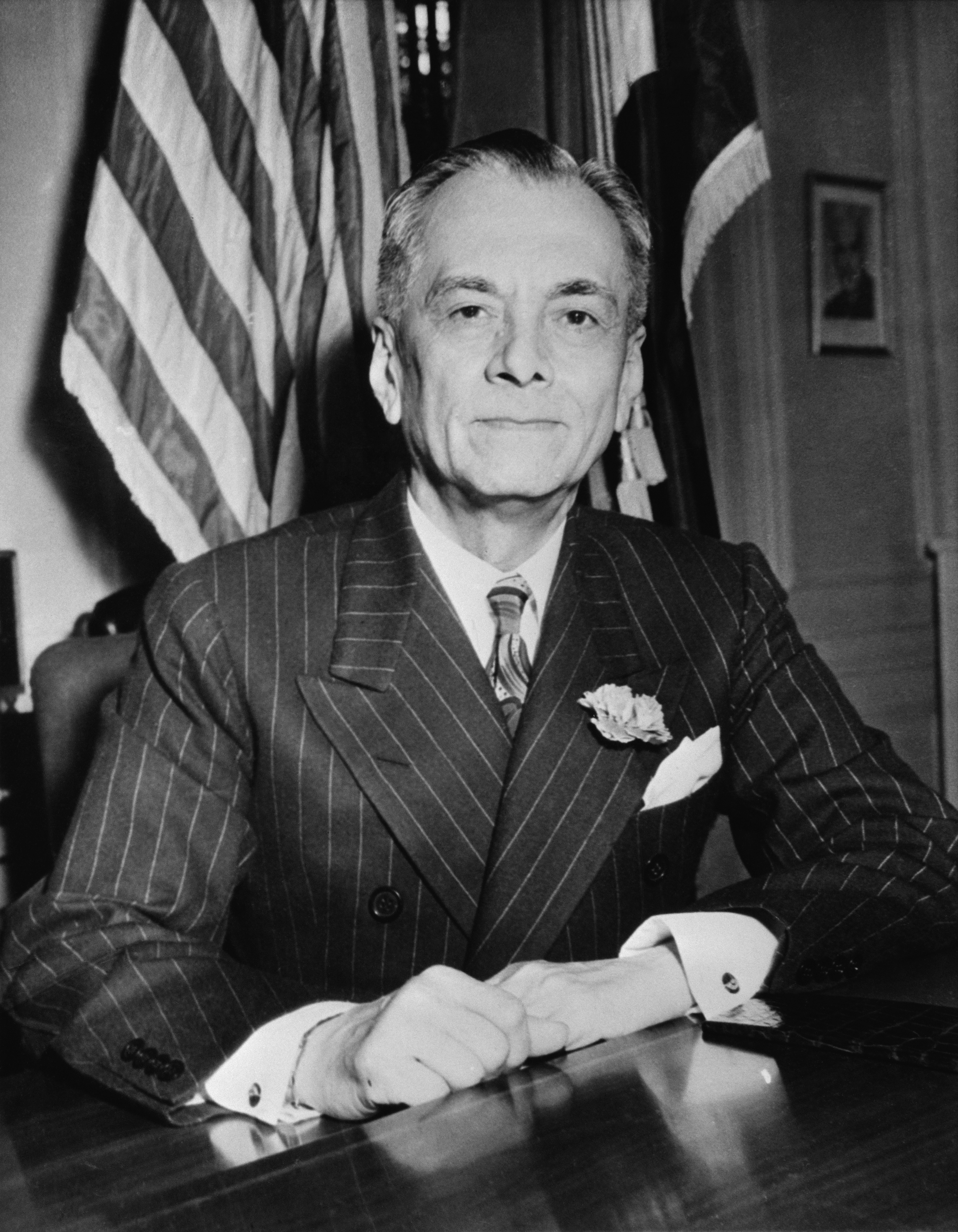
Former Philippine President Manuel L. Quezon, was a "Mestizo" of mixed Indigenous and Spanish ancestry.

These are historical Spanish terms used to identify the different types of names given to the people living in the colony.

They are:

- "Español" - A pure White European person from Spain.
- "Peninsulares" - A pure White Spaniard born in Spain but is also a settler and a citizen, living on the islands.
- "Criollo"/"Insulares" - A White Filipino of pure European Spanish ancestry, born and raised as citizens of the islands, or a person of pure White ancestry native to the island, who were descendants from White European settlers.
- "Mestizo"/"Mulatto" - A native Filipino or an Indigenous American Indian person of mixed Spanish ancestry, and an African person of mixed Spanish descent.
- "Indio" - A native Filipino or an Indigenous American Indian person, or an individual belonging to a tribal group, native to the islands.
- "Negrito"/"Negro" - A indigenous Black Filipino person, and an African person brought to the colony as slaves to work on plantation.
- "Sangley" - A word invented and used in the Philippines to denote an individual of Chinese or other East Asian background.
- "Islas Filipinas" - The name of the islands.
- "Felipinas" - The name given to the islands in 1543 by explorer Ruy López de Villalobos in honor of Prince Felipe II, who later became King of Spain in 1556. This name initially referred to just the islands of Leyte and Samar. It was later on expanded to include the entire archipelago.
- "Hispano América" - The Spanish colonies in the Americas.

=== Present-day 21st century Filipinos ===
This category is about a term used to identify the different types of Filipino ethnic groups living on the islands.

They are:

- "Native Filipino" - People of un-mixed or a Filipino person of pure ancestry from the islands.
- "Polynesian Filipino" - People of Polynesian backgrounds living on the islands, or a Filipino person of mixed Polynesian ancestry.
- "Oriental Filipino" - People from another Asian background living on the islands, or a Filipino mixed with other oriental backgrounds, or a person of South Asian descent living in the islands.
- "Mestizo Filipino" - A Filipino person of mixed ancestry.
- "Hispanic Filipino" - People of mixed native Filipino and Spanish or Latin American ancestry, or a Spanish-speaking Filipino, Hispanicized Filipino, Peninsular, Criollo, or a person of Hispanic South American descent living on the islands.
- "White Filipino" - People of White European, White American, White Latin American, White Middle Eastern and other White ethnic backgrounds living on the islands.
- "US/Native American Filipino" - A person of White American-native descent, living on the islands.
- "Black Filipino" - People of Black African, African American and Black Latin American backgrounds, living on the islands, or a Filipino person of mixed Black ancestry.

== Religion ==
The majority of Spaniards, Latin Americans and Hispanic Filipinos are Christians, with most adhering to Roman Catholicism.

== Language ==
Spanish, Spanish creole (Chavacano), English, Tagalog and other Indigenous Filipino languages are spoken in their community.

=== Philippine Spanish ===
Philippine Spanish (Spanish: Español Filipino, Castellano Filipino) is a Spanish dialect and variant of the Spanish language spoken in the Philippines. Philippine Spanish is very similar to Mexican Spanish due to the contribution of grammar and vocabulary spoken by Mexican settlers in the country, during the Galleon trade. A constitution ratified in 1987 designated Filipino and English as official languages. Also, under this Constitution, Spanish, together with Arabic, was designated an optional and voluntary language.

Spanish is now spoken mostly by Hispanic Filipinos, educated Filipinos and Filipinos who chose to speak the language. Most Spanish Filipinos speak Spanish as their first, second or third language as they have shifted to communicating in English and Tagalog and/or other Indigenous Filipino languages in the public sphere.

== Economy ==
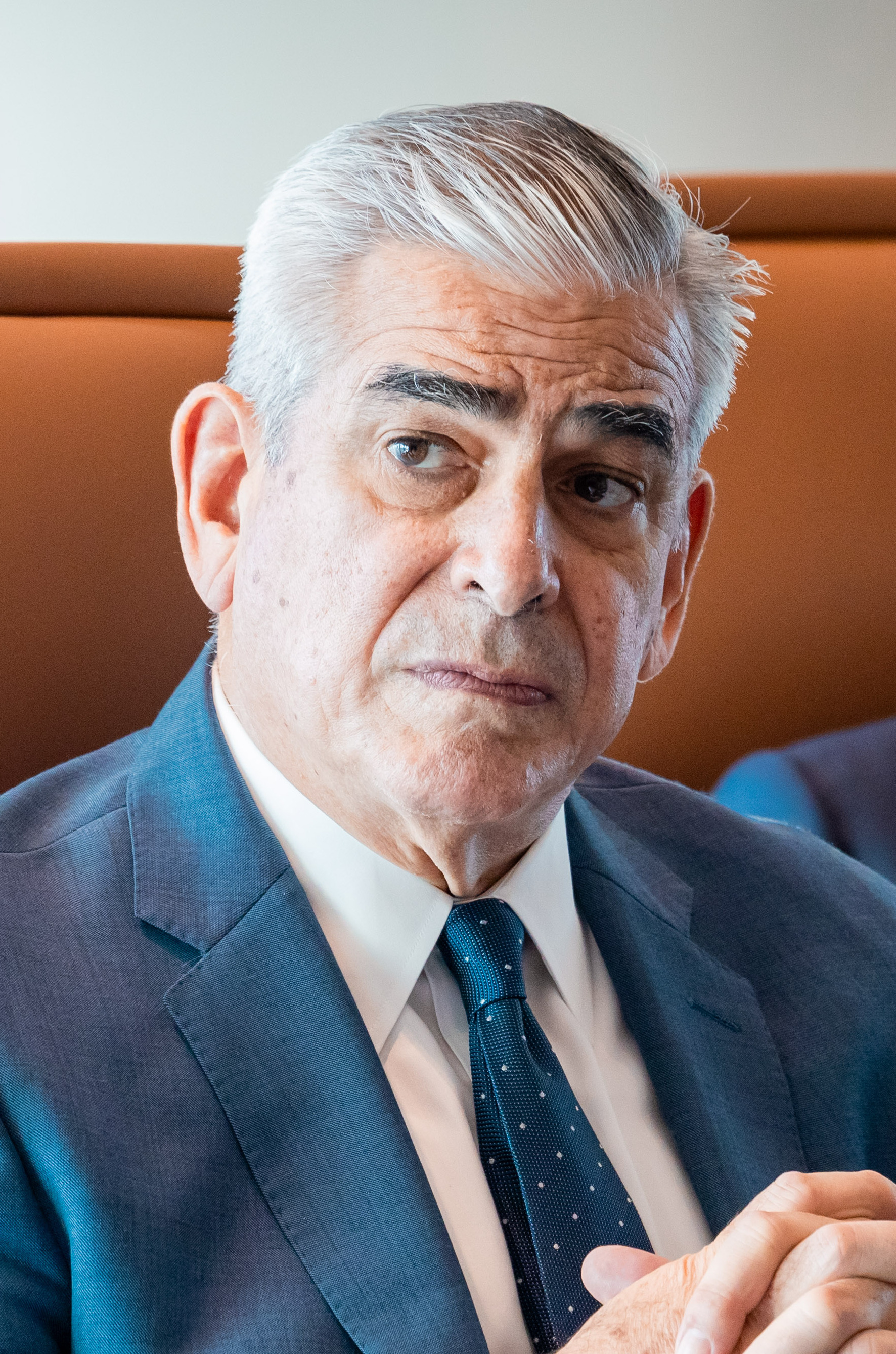
Jaime Ayala

"Criollo (Insulares)"

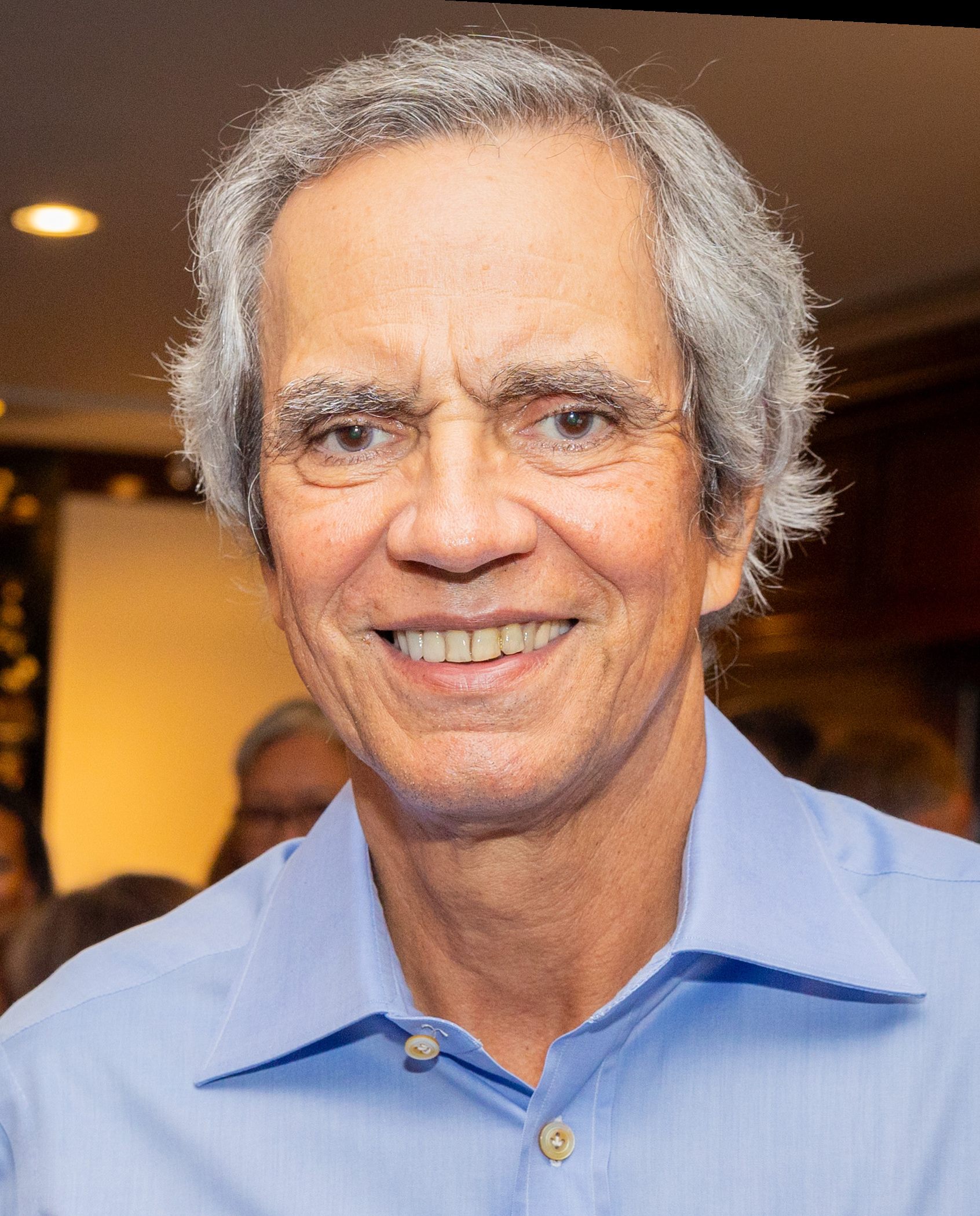
Enrique Razon

"Criollo (Insulares)"

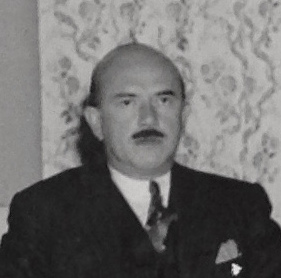
Andrés Soriano

"Criollo (Insulares)"

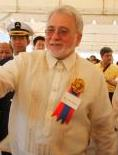
Ramón Aboitiz

"Torna atrás"

Prominent Philippine billionaire businessmen are descendants of White Europeans (Spanish) "Peninsulares" and "Criollo" (Insulares) settlers.

Support from wealthy Hispanic, Chinese, and Indian communities in the country has played an important part of helping shape both the economy and traditional identity of the people.

The most successful Hispanic individuals are found in the upper-class society, most of whom are highly educated and are involved in business and economic sectors.

They support and contribute to some of the Philippines's most important investments in infrastructures such as telecommunication, technology, electricity, water, transport, banking, land economy, tourism, sport and entertainment, shipping trade and marketing.

== Legacy ==
=== Public communication ===
In 1899, the First Philippine Republic promulgated a constitution that designated Spanish as the nation's official language. The Philippines was the only Spanish speaking country in Asia, from the beginning of colonial rule in the 1500s until the first half of the 20th century. It held official status for over four centuries and was redesignated as an optional language in 1987. This disrupted the development of the language, which led the Philippines to be an incomplete Spanish-speaking country.

Tagalog and English remained as the official languages of the country as they have been in previous constitution. In 1987, the Tagalog language which was called Filipino was promoted as the main language, a language that was chosen by the former Philippine president Manuel L. Quezon in 1935, who himself was of mixed Spanish ancestry.

To this day, Spanish still remains and continues to be spoken, butit is mostly spoken and used in universities and in Hispanic communities. The Philippines is a member of the Latin Union where the language is used for education in the Instituto Cervantes, in the capital city of Manila.

In 2010, the former Philippine president Gloria Macapagal Arroyo, a fluent Spanish speaker, re-instated the language as a compulsory subject to be taught in schools and universities.

Most Spanish-speaking Filipinos also used English in the public sphere and may also speak Tagalog and other Philippine languages. In addition, Chavacano (a creole language based largely in the Spanish vocabulary) is spoken in the southern Philippines and forms the majority of Zamboanga Peninsula and Basilan region. It is also spoken in some parts of Central and Northern Philippines.

== Culture ==
Hispanic Filipinos share some similarities to cultural practices from people in Latin America and Spain, including a shared history, tradition, names, arts and literature, music, food, religion and language.

They have also taken some influences from the United States, as evidenced by their admiration for Anglo-American Popular culture.

=== Literature ===
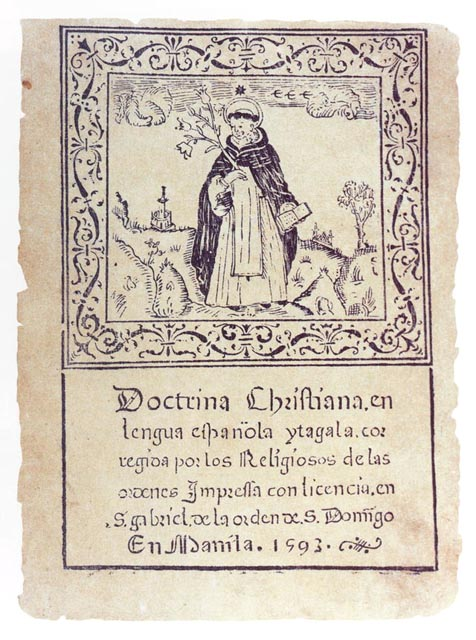
Cover of the Doctrina Christiana featuring Saint Dominic with the book's full title. Woodcut, c. 1590.

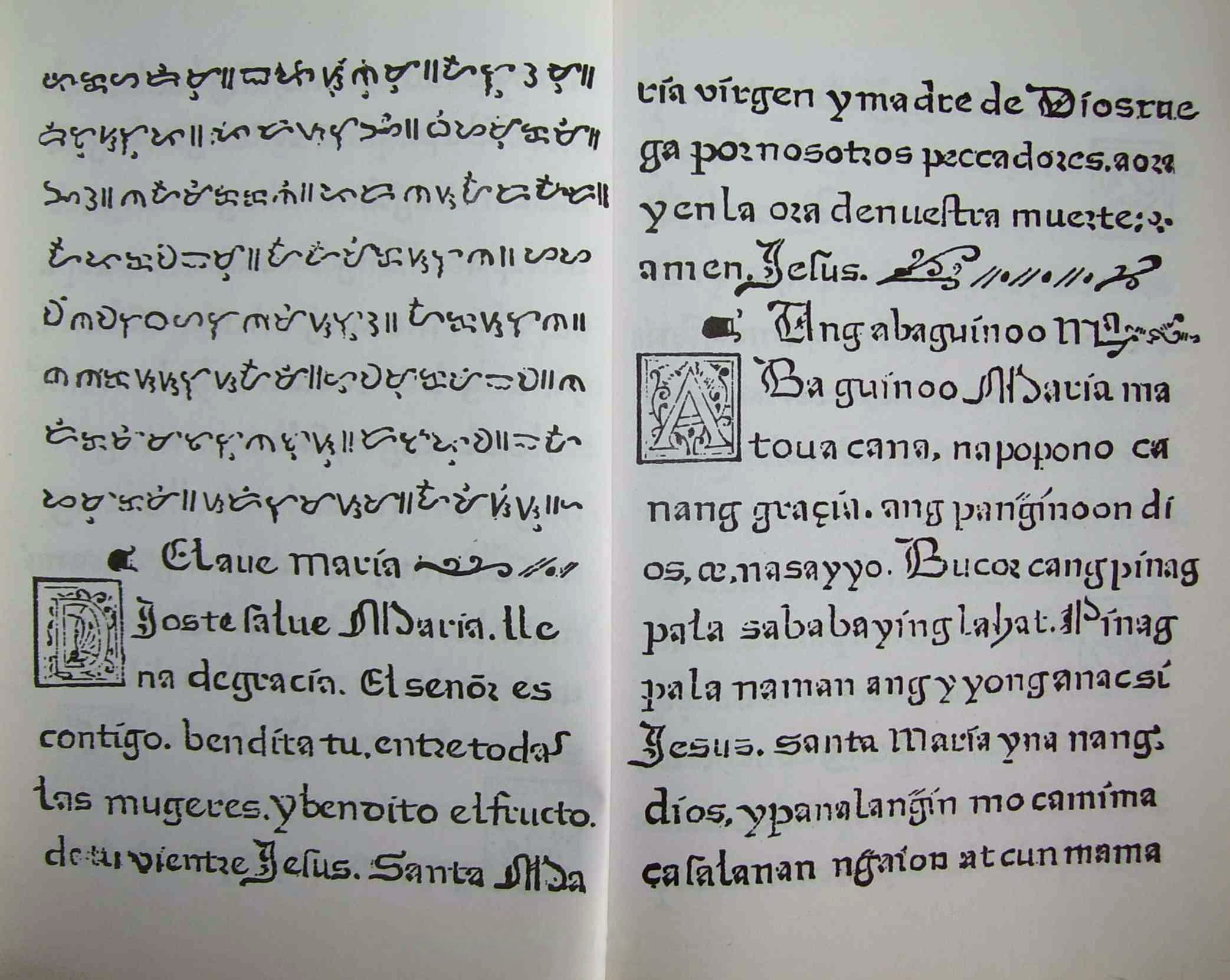
Pages of the Doctrina Christiana, an early Christian book in Spanish and Tagalog. The book contained Latin and Baybayin suyat scripts (1593).

=== "Literatura Filipina en Español" ===
Philippine literature in Spanish ("Literatura Filipina en Español") is a body of original Hispanic literature made by Filipino writers in the Spanish language which was first published in 1593 by Spanish Roman Catholic priest.

Today, this corpus is the third largest in the whole corpus of Philippine literature (Philippine literature in Filipino being the first, followed by Philippine literature in English). It is slightly larger than Philippine literature in vernacular languages. However, because of the very few additions to it in the past 30 years, it is expected that the latter will soon overtake its rank.

The most popular written Hispanic literature in the Philippines is "Noli Me Tángere," a novel written by José Rizal.

=== Art ===
Hispanic art explores the rich history and story of the ancient world, combined with colonialism, religion and contemporary way of life.

=== Music and cinema ===
Hispanic music is a blend of traditional European folk music mixed with Indigenous American-Indian, Indigenous Filipino and African sounds, together with contemporary European, Latin and Anglo-American genre. Films, hip-hop, pop, dance, rock and heavy metal are also popular.

=== Cuisine ===
Spanish cuisine is traditionally of European origin. Filipino cuisine is a blend of European and Asian influences.

=== Sport ===
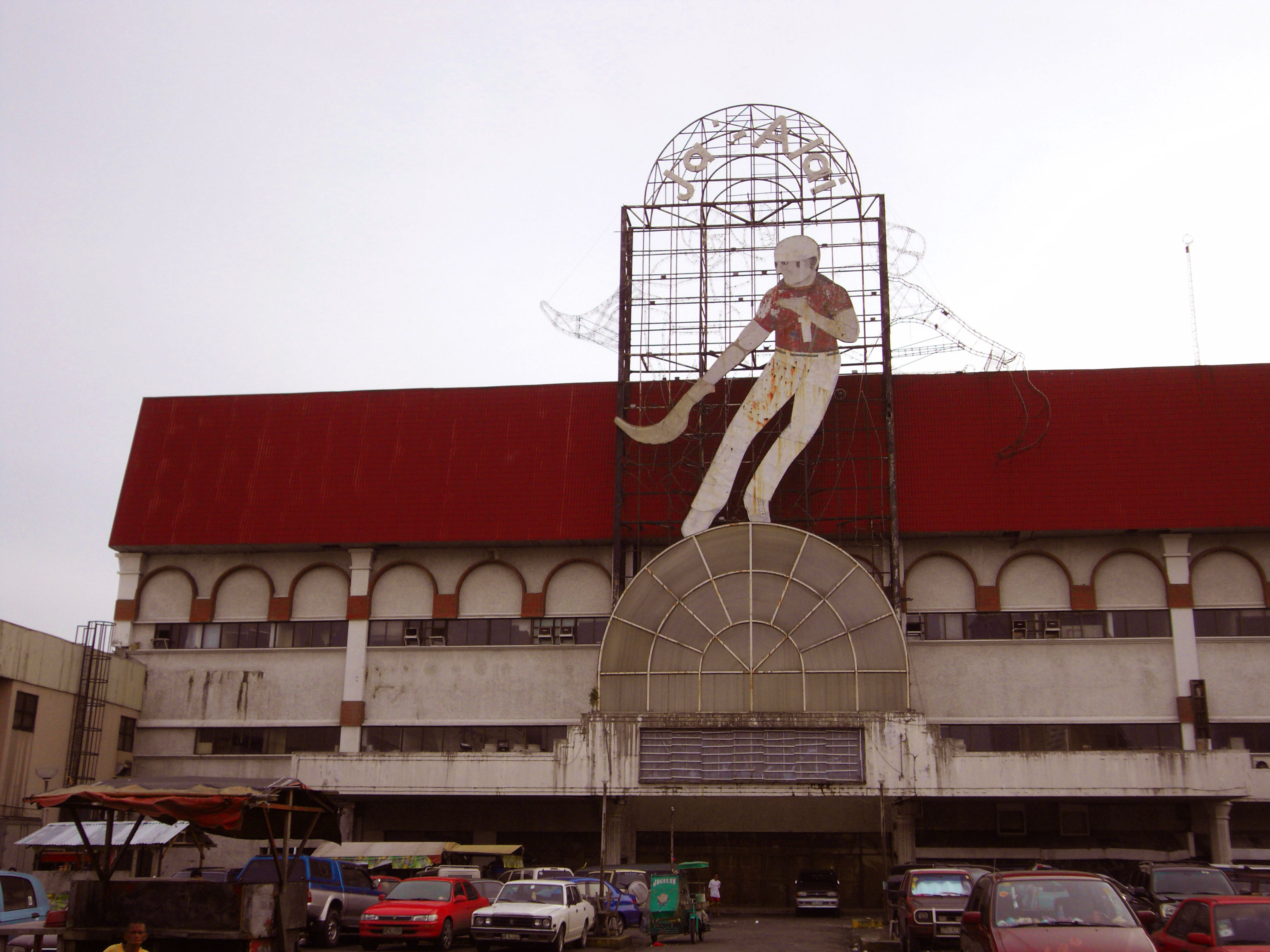
The Basque sport of pelota is played in specialized venues such as the pictured jai alai or the earlier Manila Jai Alai Building. The players are mainly of Basque (Spanish or French) descent.

Football is the most watched and played sport in Spain and in Latin America. In the Philippines football is also popular particularly among the Hispanic communities and fans of the sport.

Tennis, basketball, beach volleyball, volleyball, baseball, boxing, UFC, cycling, motor sports and water sports are also widely appreciated in the Spanish community.

The game of basketball is one of Spain's most popular sports and is second only to football, played at a professional level, while in the Philippines it is considered its national sport.

== Notable people ==
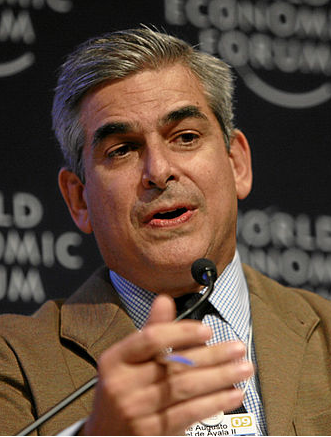
Jaime Ayala
Filipino
Philippine businessman

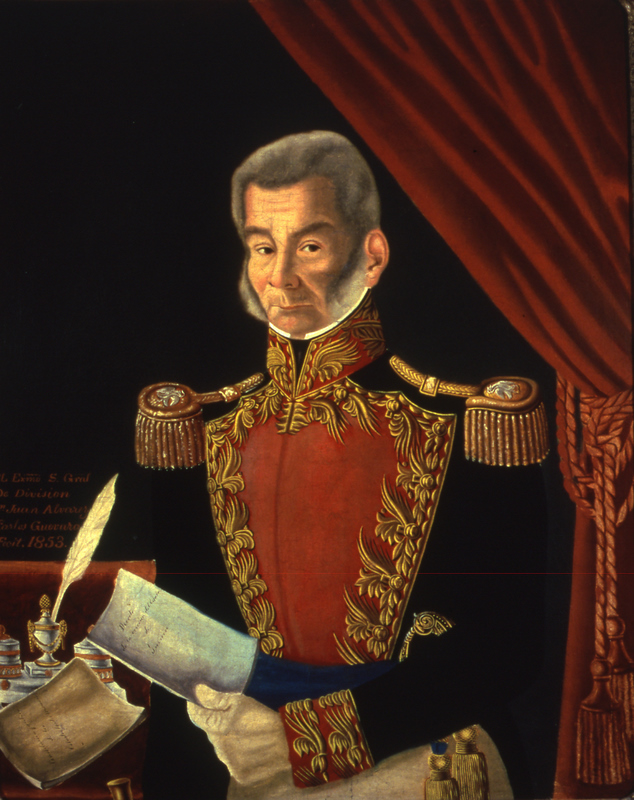
Juan Álvarez
Mexican
President of Mexico

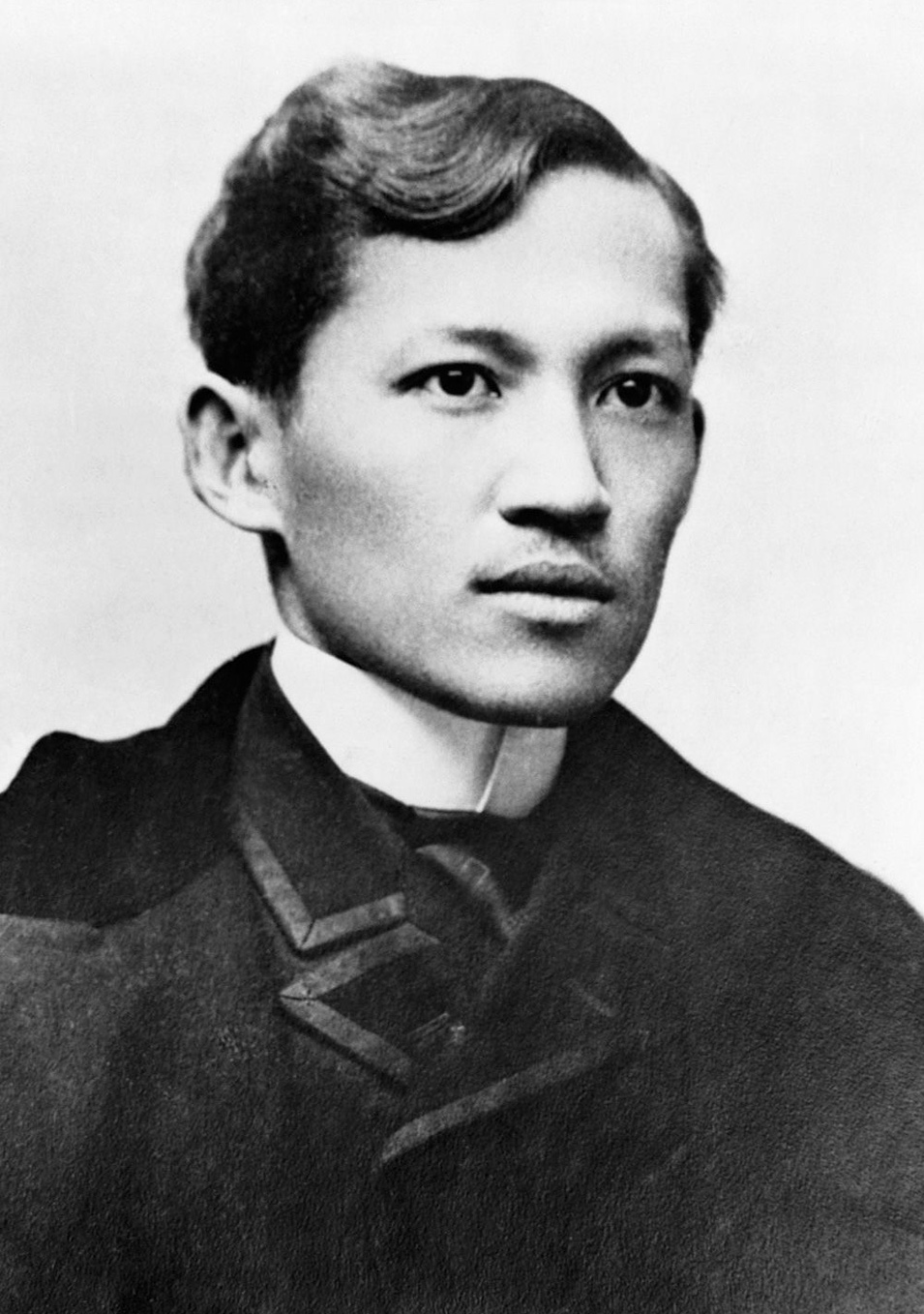
José Rizal
Filipino
Philippine Nationalist

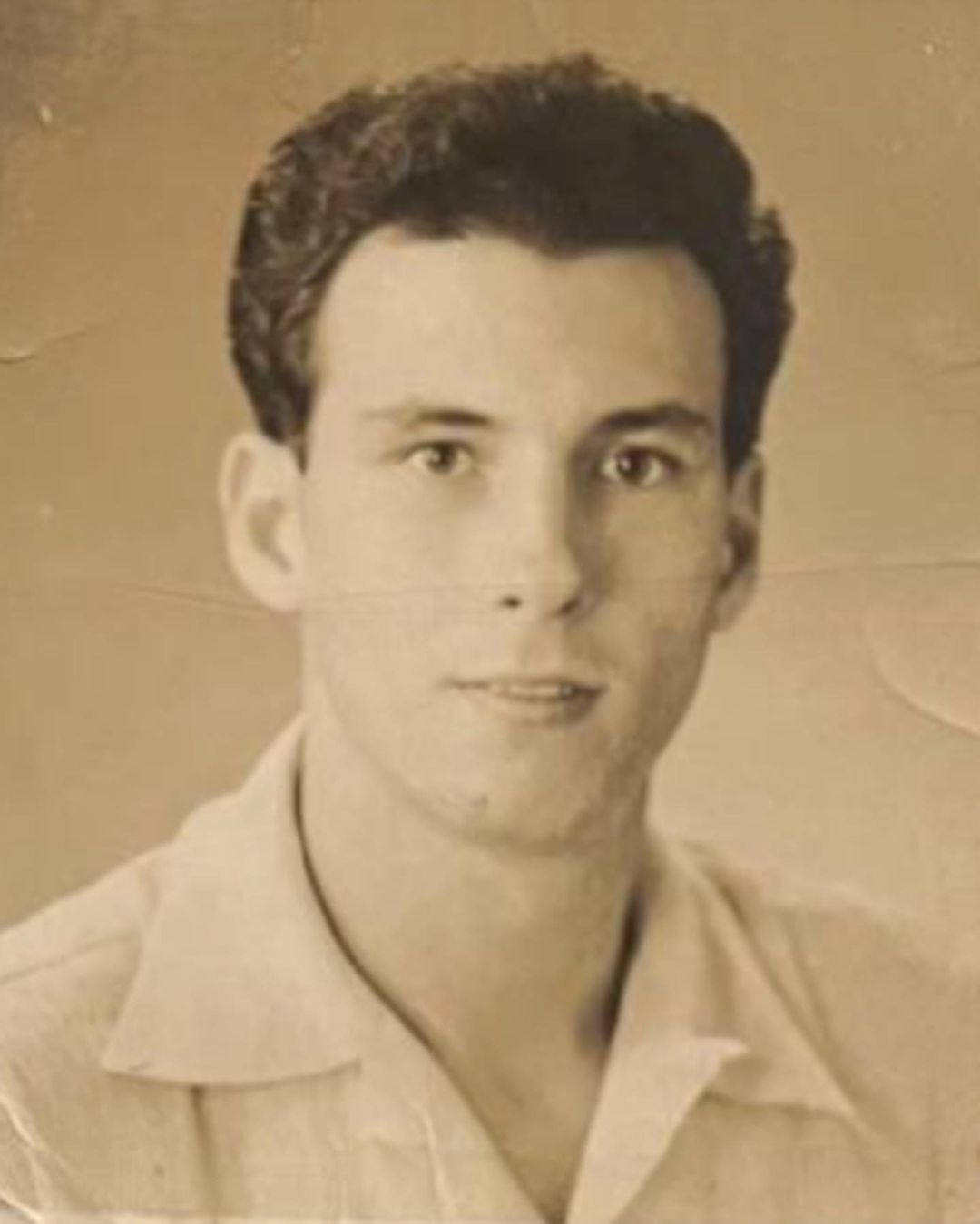
Carlos Loyzaga
Filipino
Philippine basketballer

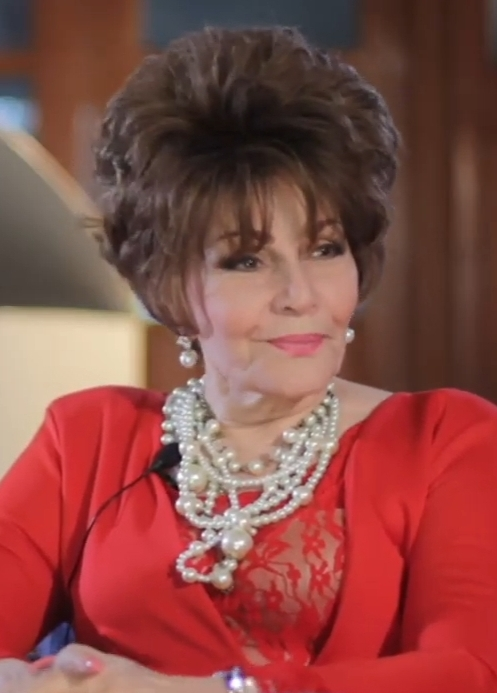
Pilita Corrales
Filipina
Philippine singer

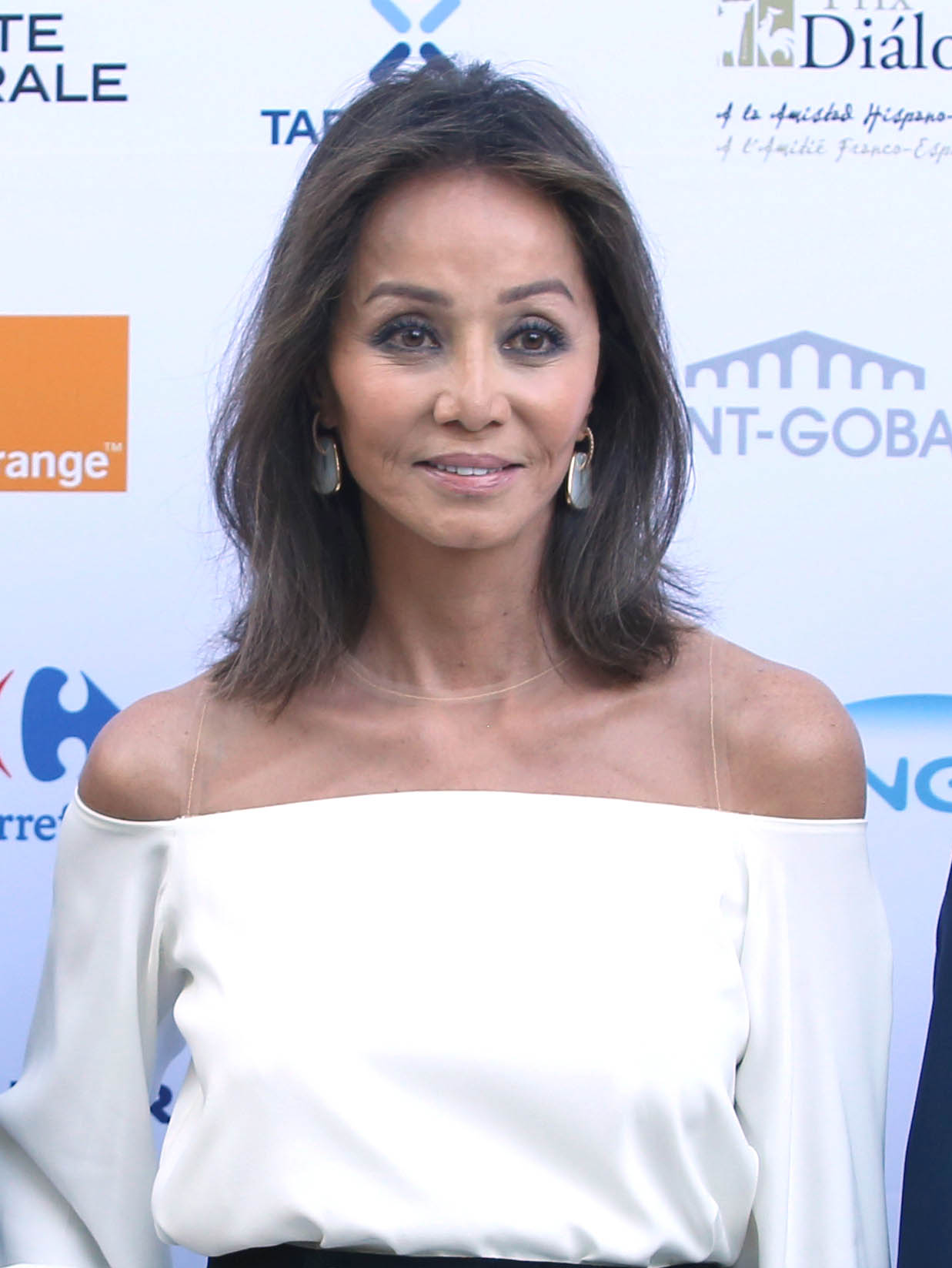
Isabel Preysler
Spaniard
Spanish journalist

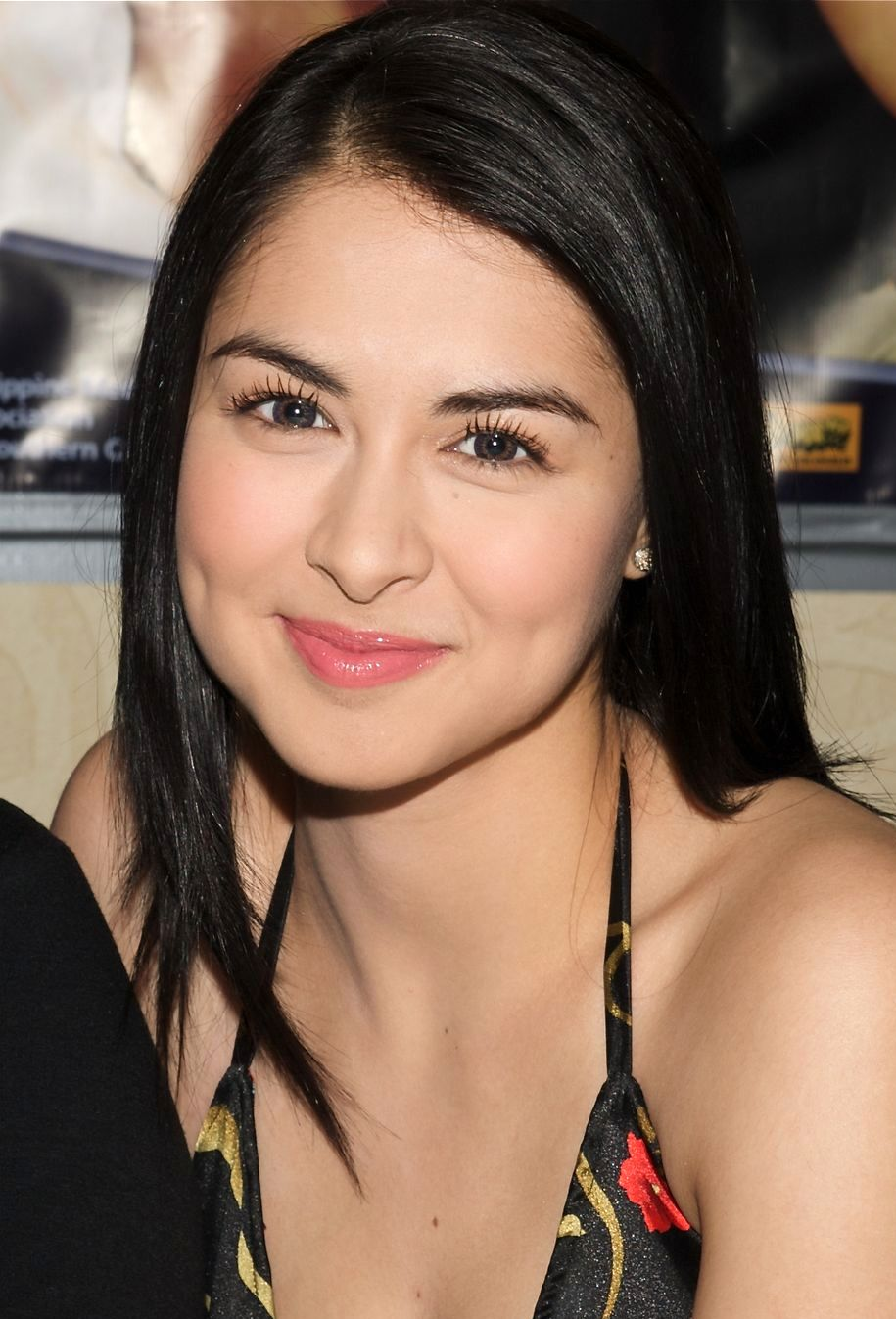
Marian Rivera
Filipina
Philippine actress

=== International ===
==== Sport ====
- Caloy Loyzaga- Former professional basketball player. He led the Philippines to bronze medal at the 1954 FIBA World Championship, where he was named to the All-Tournament second team.
- Paulino Alcántara -Former professional footballer and manager who played as a forward. Born in the Philippines, he played for Catalonia, Philippines and Spain national teams.
- Joaquin Loyzaga - Former international footballer who has covered both the roles of defender and goalkeeper. He played for Bohemian S.C. and represented the Philippine team in the Far Eastern Championship Games, the precursor of the Asian Games.
- Virgilio Lobregat - Former professional footballer. He played for Bohemian S.C., Manila Nomads Sports Club and Casino Español de Manila. He also competed for the Philippines national football team at the Far Eastern Games.
- Angel Guirado - Former professional footballer who played as a forward. He represented the Philippine national football team at senior level.
- Eduardo Teus - Football
- Juan Torena - Football
- Manuel Amechazurra - Football
- Gregorio Querejeta - Football
- Nick Rimando - Football
- Saúl Berjón - Football
- Leylah Fernandez - Tennis

==== Music ====
- Luis Eduardo Aute - Spanish Singer-songwriter.
- Joe Bataan - Singer
- Asia Nitollano - Singer
- Cassie Ventura - Singer
- Jasmine V - Singer

==== Films ====
- Neile Adams - Actress
- Steven R. McQueen - Actor

==== Fashion ====
- Arianny Celeste - Model

==== Literature ====
- George Santayana - Writer and philosopher

===== Fiction =====
- Juan Johnny Rico - Novel and film character

==== Journalism ====
- Isabel Preysler - Journalist, socialite and television presenter
- Marco Lobregat - Writer, columnist, editor and author
- David Celdran - Journalist, TV host and presenter

==== Politics ====
- Marcelo Azcárraga - Prime minister
- Juan Álvarez - President
- Isidoro Montes de Oca - Revolutionary leader
- Alejandro Gómez Maganda - Governor
- Jorge Moragas - Chief of Staff of the Spanish Prime Minister

=== Philippines ===
==== Economics ====
- Zóbel de Ayala family - Business family
  - Joseph McMicking de Ynchausti
  - Enrique Zobel de Ayala - Businessman, industrialist and philanthropist
  - Enrique Zobel - Businessman, pilot and polo player
  - Jaime Zobel de Ayala - Businessman
  - Jaime Augusto Zóbel de Ayala - Businessman
  - Fernando Zobel de Ayala - Businessman
- Manolo Elizalde - Businessman
- Enrique K. Razon - Businessman
- Andrés Soriano - Businessman
- Ramón Aboitiz - Businessman

==== Sport ====
- Carlos Loyzaga - Basketballer
- Chito Loyzaga - Former professional basketball player and commissioner. He played for the San Beda Red Lions in the NCAA and Ginebra San Miguel in the PBA.
- Francis Arnaiz - Former professional basketball player. He is best known for his career in the Philippine Basketball Association, playing for Toyota and Ginebra San Miguel from 1975 to 1986.
- Juan Gomez de Liano - Professional basketball player for the Converge FiberXers of the Philippine Basketball Association
- Javi Gomez de Liano - Professional basketball player for the Magnolia Chicken Timplados Hotshots of the Philippine Basketball Association
- Edmundo Badolato - Former college basketball head coach and basketball executive
- Caloy Garcia - Professional Basketball Coach and current assistant coach of Rain or Shine Elasto Painters of the Philippine Basketball Association and De La Salle Green Archers of the University Athletic Association of the Philippines
- Paulino Alcantara - Footballer
- Santiago Rublico - Footballer
- Jessica Miclat - Footballer
- Kiara Fontanilla - Footballer
- Quinley Quezada - Footballer
- Reina Bonta - Footballer

==== Films ====
- Ashley Ortega - Actress
- Gloria Romero - Actress
- Delia Razon - Actress
- Amalia Fuentes - Actress
- Marian Rivera - Actress
- Fernando Poe Jr. - Actor
- Eddie Garcia - Actor
- Jaime Fabregas - Actor
- Janine Gutiérrez - Actress and model
- Maggie Dela Riva - Actress

==== Music ====
- Fred Elizalde - Classical and jazz pianist, composer, conductor, and bandleader, influential in the British dance band era.
- Chanty - Singer and actress
- Pilita Corrales - Singer

==== Art ====
- Juan Luna - Artist
- Fernando Zóbel de Ayala y Montojo - Painter

==== Fashion ====
- Celeste Cortesi - Beauty pageant
- Ahtisa Manalo - Beauty pageant
- Katarina Rodríguez - Beauty pageant
- Stella Araneta - Beauty pageant
- Gloria Díaz - Beauty pageant

==== Literature ====
- Fernando María Guerrero - Writer
- Lourdes Castrillo Brillantes - Writer
- Guillermo Gomez Rivera - Writer, journalist, poet, playwright, historian, linguist, Hispanista

==== Journalism ====
- Dyan Castillejo - Journalist
- Marco Lobregat - Writer, columnist, editor and author
- David Celdran - Journalist, TV host and presenter

==== Religion ====
- José María of Manila - Roman Catholic Saint
- Juan de Plasencia - Priest
- Manuel Rojo del Río y Vieyra - Priest
- Jose Burgos - Priest
- Pedro Pelaez - Priest, Diocesan Administrator of the Archbishop of Manila. He advocated for the secularization of Filipino priests during the early 19th century.

==== Politics ====
- José Rizal - Nationalist, writer and polymath
- Emilio Aguinaldo - 1st President of the Philippines and revolutionary leader
- Felipe Calderón - Revolutionary leader
- Antonio Luna - Revolutionary leader
- Ilustrados - Educated class
- Rodrigo Duterte - 16th President of the Philippines (2016-2022)
- Chito Gascon - Commission on Human Rights
- Gloria Macapagal Arroyo - 14th President of the Philippines (2001-2010)
- Bongbong Marcos - 17th President of the Philippines (2022-Present)
- Manuel L. Quezon - 2nd President of the Philippines (1935-1944)
- Tomas Morato - 1st Mayor of Quezon City (1939-1942)
- Andres Garchitorena - 8th Governor of Camarines Sur (1919-1922)
- Mariano Garchitorena - 15th Governor of Camarines Sur (1945-1946)
- Manuel L. Sagarbarria - 91st Governor of Negros Oriental (2023-Present)
- Maria Clara Lobregat - 18th Mayor of Zamboanga City (1998-2004)
- Celso Lobregat, III - 20th Mayor of Zamboanga City (2013-2019)
- Jose Altavas - Senator of the Philippines (1916-1922)
- Vicente Madrigal - Senator of the Philippines (1945-1953)
- Marcelo Fernán - Chief Justice and President of the Senate

== See also ==
- Philippines–Spain relations
- Spanish people of Filipino ancestry
- Mexican settlement in the Philippines
- Filipino immigration to Mexico

== Sources ==
- The Conquest of Paradise: Christopher Columbus and the Columbian Legacy, Kirkpatrick Sale (1990–1991)
- Conquistadors: The Rise and Fall (Documentary Series, 2023)
- Antonio García, Spanish Settlers in the Philippines 1571–1599, Universidad de Córdoba España, www.uco.es
- Francisco de Sande, Juan de Ovando, "Spanish Settlers in the Philippines (1571-1599)," President of the Council to the Indies New Spain, 1574
