= Guillermo Larregui =

Spanish traveller

Guillermo Isidoro Larregui Ugarte (1885–1964) was a Spaniard traveller born in Pamplona, Spain. He is known as "the Basque with the wheelbarrow" (El Vasco de la Carretilla), and also as "the Quixote of the one-wheeler". Over several decades, he travelled more than 22,000 km on foot in Argentina and Latin America, pushing a 130 kg wheelbarrow.

== Life ==
He was born in the Rochapea district of Pamplona on November 27, 1885. Although his birthplace was not within the Basque Country, Spain, he identified as Basque throughout his life. He left Pamplona, Spain and arrived in Buenos Aires at the age of fifteen in 1900. He worked various jobs, including as a sailor and as a laborer in Patagonia. In 1935, at the age of 50, as the result of a bet with friends, he embarked on the journey that made him one of the most eccentric characters in Argentina. The original wheelbarrow was bought for him by a friend; it held a tent, bedding, kitchen equipment, tools, clothing and personal effects.

Larregui's knowledge of multiple languages, including Italian and French, was helpful on the road. He made four separate journeys of varying length across Argentina, Bolivia, Chile, etc, and on the last of these journeys he walked from Trenque Lauquen to the falls of the Iguazú National Park, in Misiones province. He made his permanent home in Puerto Iguazu, and died in the town in June 1964. He is buried in the town cemetery and memorialized by a statue on the riverfront.
