= Basque diaspora =

Ethnic diaspora

The Basque diaspora is the name given to describe people of Basque origin living outside their traditional homeland on the borders between Spain and France. Many Basques have left the Basque Country for other parts of the globe for economic and political reasons, with a substantial population in Chile and Colombia.

Notably, the Basque diaspora is sometimes referred to as "the eighth province" (Basque: zortzigarren probintzia), indirectly referring to the historical seven Basque provinces.

== South America ==
=== Argentina ===
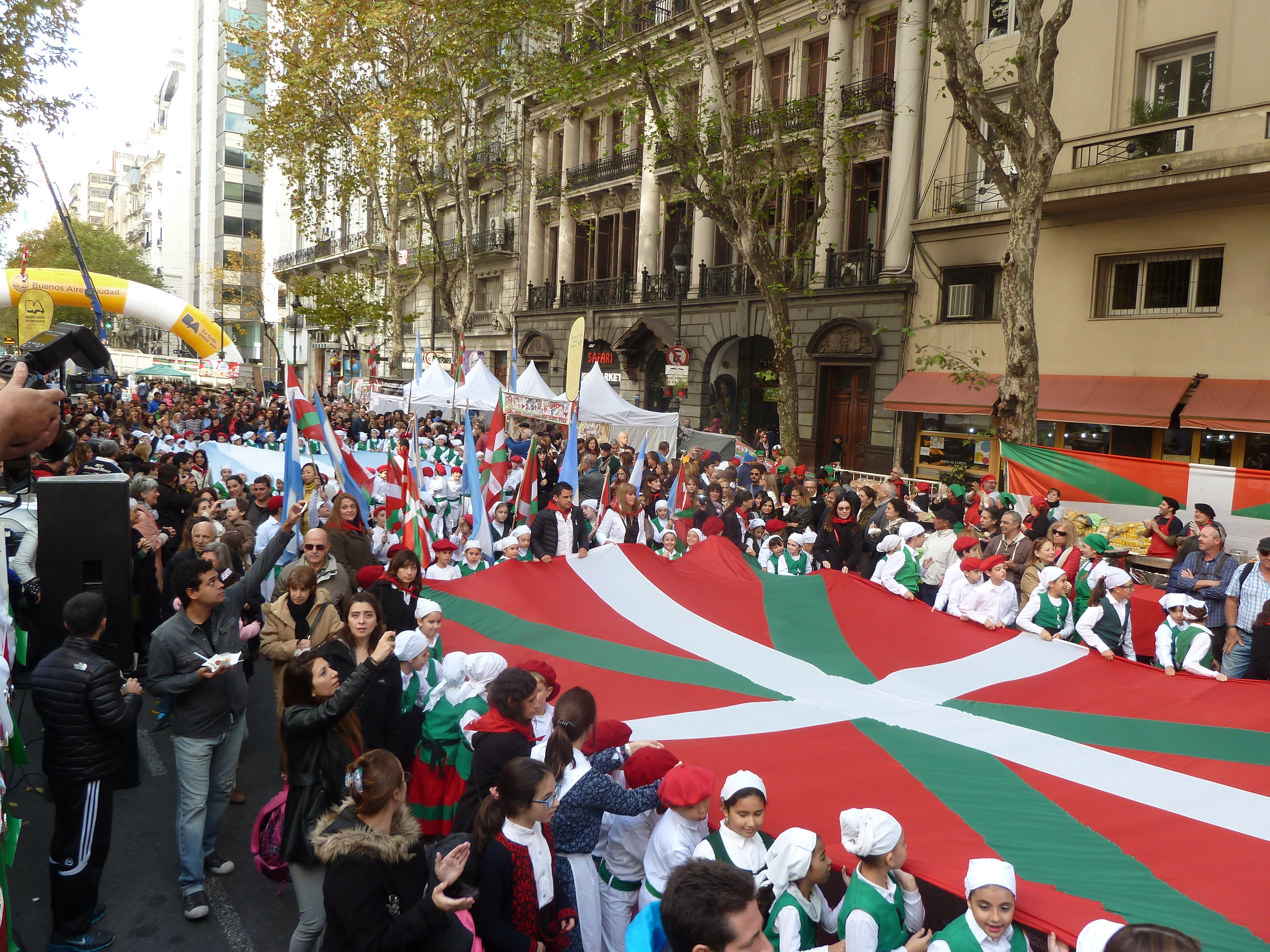
Basque Festival in Buenos Aires, Argentina, 12 May 2016

People of Basque descent make up 10% of Argentina's population, and it was a major destination for Basques emigrating from both Spain and France in the 19th and 20th centuries. Basques have left an indelible imprint on Argentine culture and politics, with many place names and surnames, including those of several Presidents. After several generations, a sense of Basque heritage is still strong, maintained through numerous Basque cultural centres in major cities. Argentine sportspeople with Basque surnames have frequently been nicknamed El Vasco.

=== Chile ===
The Basques arrived in Chile in the 18th century from their homeland in the Basque Country, including both the Basque Provinces in northern Spain and the ones in southwestern France, as merchants and due to their hard work and entrepreneurship, rose to the top of the social scale and intermarried into the Chilean elites of Castilian descent. This union is the basis of the Chilean elite of today. The Basque settlers also intermarried into the Mestizo population of central Chile in the middle of the colonial period to form the large Castizo population that exists in Chile today; Castizos makeup modern lower-middle and lower classes. Thousands of Basque refugees fleeing the Spanish Civil War in 1939 also settled and have many descendants in the country and have even intermarried with other Spanish ethnic groups other than Castilians as well as other European ethnic groups. Population estimates of Basque-Chileans range from 30% (5,000,000) to as high as 40% (7, 700,000).

Miguel de Unamuno stated that two things could be clearly attributed to the Basques: The Jesuits and the Republic of Chile.

=== Colombia ===
Colombia was one of early focus of Basque immigration. According to the Basque Government, Colombia has about 27,000,000 basque descendants, making it to the largest basque diaspora in the world. In genetic studies tracking the Iberian Y-chromosome haplogroup R1b-DF27 across Latin America, Colombia was found to have the highest concentration of this Basque-associated genetic marker in Latin America.. Basque ancestry is predominant in the Coffee Axis and Antioquia .

=== Peru ===
A notable percentage of Peruvian people have at least one Basque surname, with more than 6 million or 18% of the national population. They trace back their presence to colonial times.

=== Uruguay ===
It is estimated that up to 10% of Uruguay's population has at least one parent with a Basque surname. The first wave of Basque immigrants to Uruguay came from the French side of the Basque country beginning about 1824.

=== Venezuela ===
The first wave of Basque immigration to Venezuela consisted of Conquerors and Missionaries, during the Colonization of Venezuela. The second wave of Basque immigration started in 1939, as a result of the Spanish Civil War.

== North America ==
=== Mexico ===
An estimated 2% of Mexicans have some amount of Basque descent, and that community has increased in size from immigration from Spain in the early 20th century. The Spanish Civil War in the 1930s brought over tens of thousands of refugees from the Basque Country to political asylum in Mexico and Latin America.

=== United States ===
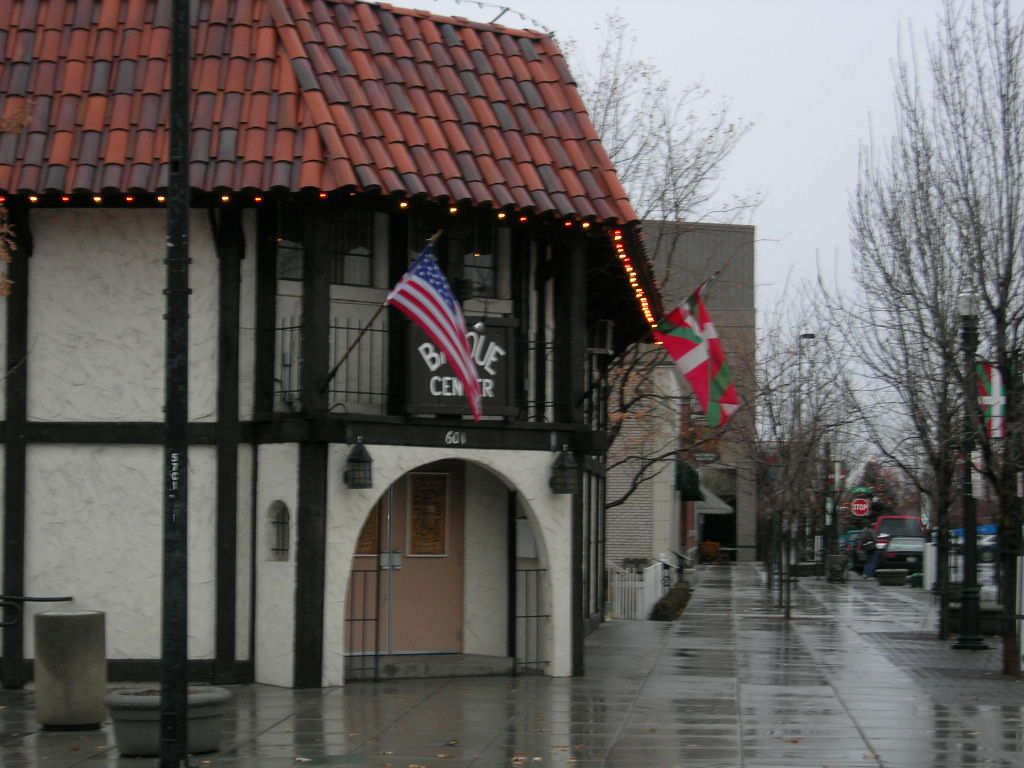
A Basque center in Boise, Idaho

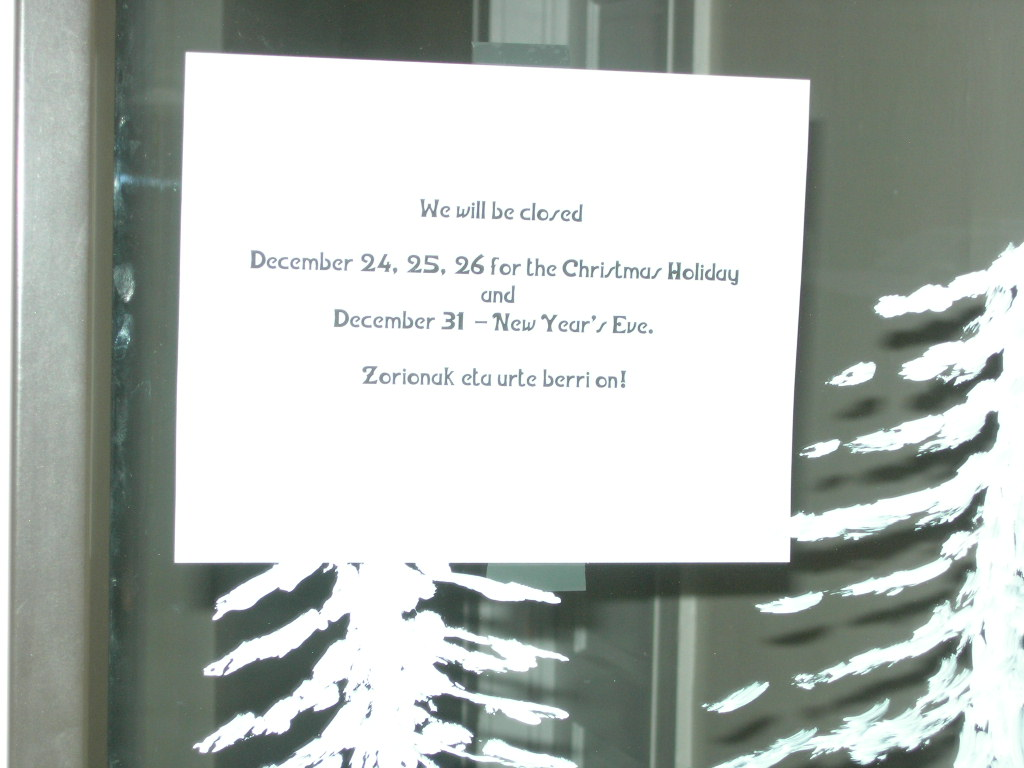
Christmas notice partly in Basque ("Merry Christmas and a Happy New Year!" in Basque), also from Boise

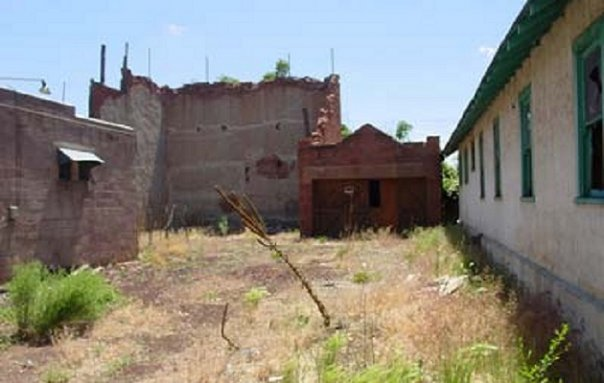
A Basque pelota in Flagstaff, Arizona. Constructed in 1926.

There are about 57,000 people of Basque descent living in the United States, according to the 2000 census. This number is highly disputed, however, since before the 1980 census there had never been a federally recognized category for Basques. As a result, Basques were usually categorized as Spanish or French. It is speculated that there are many more Americans of Basque descent who still classify themselves as Spanish, French or Latin American.

The largest concentration of Basque Americans is in the Boise, Idaho, area, where approximately 15,000 Basque Americans live. Boise is home of the Basque Museum and Cultural Center and hosts a large Basque festival known as Jaialdi every five years. They also host a number of other Basque festivals, including the San Inazio Festival each summer and there are many Basque restaurants located in Boise. A large majority of the Boise Basque community traces its ancestry to Bizkaia (Vizcaya in Spanish, Biscay in English) in northern Spain.

== Asia ==
=== Philippines ===
Basque immigrants comprised a big part, if not most, of the Spanish expatriate population of the Philippines during the Spanish colonial period. Most of them were soldiers and sailors in the military and navy of the viceroyalty of New Spain, merchants, missionaries, and clergy. Families of Basque ancestry, over time, slowly integrated into the Philippine social landscape, developing themselves into some of the most prominent families in the country. Basque descendants in the Philippines today consider themselves to be Filipinos and remain influential in the business and political sectors of the country. They include the Aboitiz family, the Zobel de Ayala family, the Araneta family and political clans like the Zubiri and the Ozámiz families.

== See also ==
- Carlos Loyzaga
- Azcárraga family
- Balmaceda family
- Larraín family
- Juana Inés de la Cruz
- Agustín de Iturbide
- Che Guevara
- Simón Bolívar
- Pedro Arrupe
- Thunder in the Sun
- Francis Xavier
- José Mujica
- List of Basques
- List of Basque restaurants
