= Jon Ramon Aboitiz =

Filipino businessman (1948–2018)

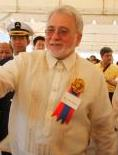
- Born: April 26, 1948; Philippines
- Died: November 30, 2018 (aged 70)
- Education: B.S. Commerce (Major in Management), University of Santa Clara, California
- Occupation: Businessman
- Years active: 1970–2018
- Employer: Aboitiz Group
- Known for: President of Aboitiz & Company, AEV Chairman
- Title: President and CEO of Aboitiz & Company; President of Aboitiz Equity Ventures
- Spouse: Maria del Rosario Vellguth
- Children: 3
- Relatives: Eduardo J. Aboitiz (father); Francisca M. Melendez (mother); Don Ramon Aboitiz (grandfather); Paulino Aboitiz (great-grandfather)

Jon Ramon Melendez Aboitiz (April 26, 1948 – November 30, 2018) was a Filipino businessman, and president of the Aboitiz & Company Inc. (ACO) and Aboitiz Equity Ventures (AEV), part of the Aboitiz Group.

== Early life ==
Born on April 26, 1948, he was the son of Eduardo J. Aboitiz and Francisca M. Melendez. His grandfather was Don Ramon Aboitiz, son of Paulino Aboitiz, founder of the Aboitiz Group in the late 1800s.

== Aboitiz ==
He started with the Aboitiz Group in 1970 after graduating from the University of Santa Clara, California with a B.S. Commerce degree, major in management. From Manager, he became President of Aboitiz Shipping Corporation in 1976. From 1991 until 2008, he was president and chief executive officer (CEO) of Aboitiz & Company. He was President of Aboitiz Equity Ventures (AEV) from 1994 until 2008. Afterwards, he became its chairman until the time of his death.

He held various positions in the Aboitiz Group, including chairman and CEO of Davao Light & Power Co., Inc.; Chairman of Visayan Electric Company (VECO) and Aboitiz Jebsen Bulk Transport Corporation; Vice Chairman of Aboitiz Power Corporation (APC) and Union Bank of the Philippines; and Director of International Container Terminal Services, Inc. (ICTS), Bloomberry Resorts Corporation, Hapag-Lloyd Philippines, Cotabato Ice Plant Inc. and Bukidnon Hydropower Corporation.

Aboitiz also served as chairman and President of the Ramon Aboitiz Foundation Inc. (RAFI Microfinance), the NGO microfinance arm of the Aboitiz Group; a Trustee of the Aboitiz Foundation Inc. (AFI) and the Association of Foundations (AF); and was a member of the Board of Advisors of the Washington SyCip Policy Forum, now the AIM Policy Center (APC), at the Asian Institute of Management.

== Death ==
He died on November 30, 2018, at 70 due to cancer and is survived by his wife Maria del Rosario Vellguth and their three children.
