= San Miguel Brewery Hong Kong =

Hong Kong brewery

San Miguel Brewery Hong Kong Ltd. 香港生力啤酒廠有限公司
- Type: Public
- Traded as: SEHK: 236
- Founded: 1948
- Headquarters: 9/F, Citimark Building, 28 Yuen Shun Circuit, Siu Lek Yuen, Sha Tin District, New Territories, Hong Kong
- Area served: Hong Kong, Macau, Guangzhou
- Key people: Ramon S. Ang (Chairman); Raymundo Y. Albano (Executive Director and Managing Director)
- Products: Beer
- Owner: San Miguel Brewing International Ltd.
- Parent: San Miguel Brewery, Inc.
- Subsidiaries: San Miguel (Guangdong) Brewery Company Ltd. Guangzhou San Miguel Brewery Company Ltd.
- Website: http://info.sanmiguel.com.hk/ (investor site) http://www.sanmiguel.com.hk/ (consumer site)

San Miguel Brewery Hong Kong
- Traditional Chinese: 香港生力啤酒廠有限公司
- Simplified Chinese: 香港生力啤酒厂有限公司
Transcriptions
Standard Mandarin
- Hanyu Pinyin: Xiānggǎng Shēng Lì Píjiǔchǎng Yǒuxiàngōngsī
Yue: Cantonese
- Jyutping: hoeng1 gong2 sang1 lik6 be1 zau2 cong2 jau5 haan6 gung1 si1

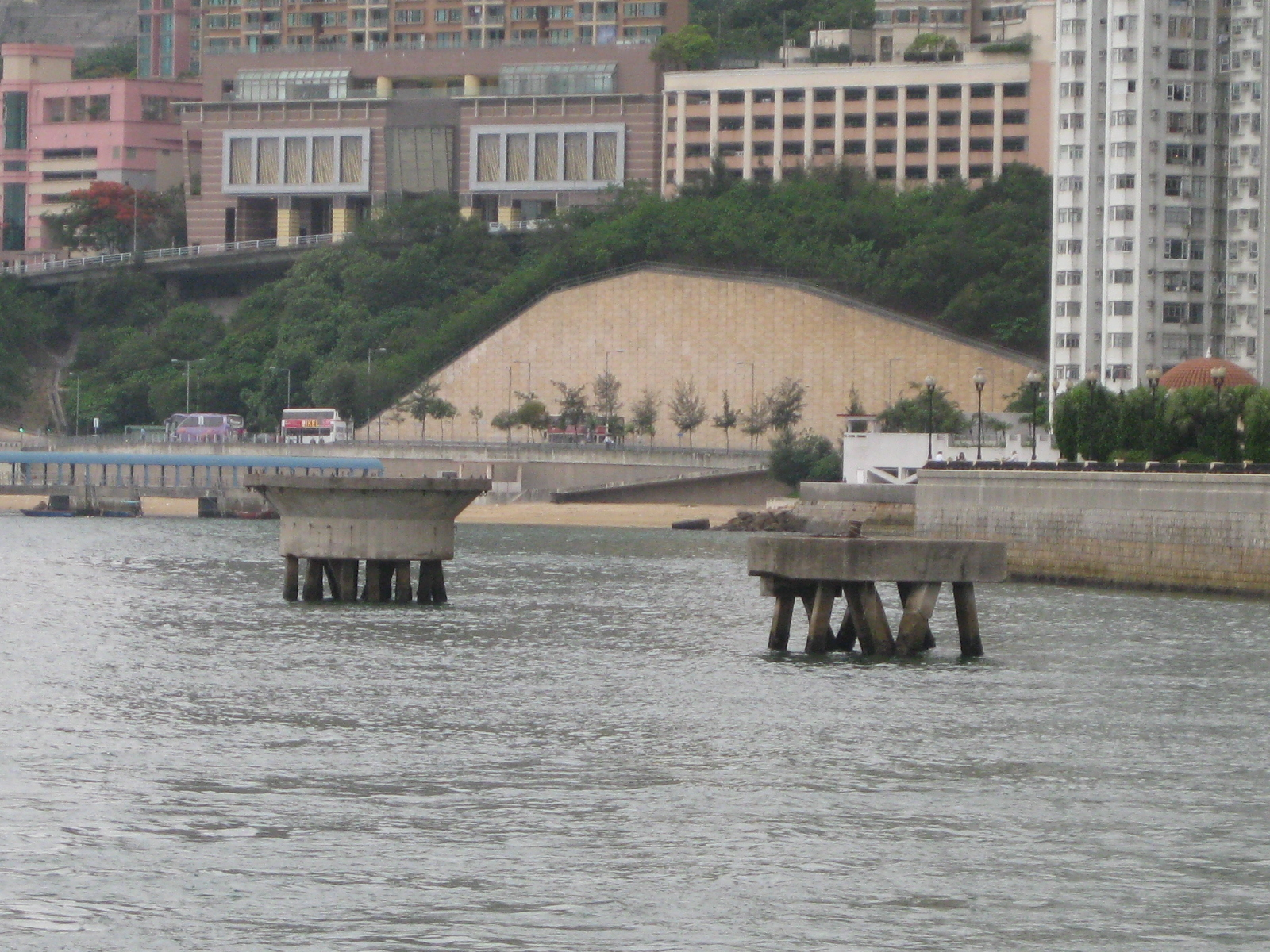
Former site of San Miguel Brewery in Sham Tseng.

San Miguel Brewery Hong Kong Ltd. (Chinese: 香港生力啤酒廠有限公司) (SMBHK) (SEHK: 236) is a brewery based in Hong Kong and is a majority-owned subsidiary of San Miguel Brewing International Ltd., a wholly owned subsidiary of San Miguel Brewery, Inc. The company has two subsidiaries located in the Guangdong province of the People’s Republic of China. An affiliate company, San Miguel Baoding Brewery Company Limited, is based in Baoding, China.

== History ==
San Miguel Beer (San Miguel Pale Pilsen) was first produced in 1890 by La Fabrica de Cerveza de San Miguel (San Miguel Brewery, now known as San Miguel Corporation) in Manila, Philippines. The brewery received the Royal Grant from the King of Spain to brew beer in the Philippines, which was then a Spanish colony.

In 1914, San Miguel Brewery began exporting San Miguel Beer to Hong Kong. The San Miguel brand name is known in Chinese as 生力 and the San Miguel Beer product name is known as 生力啤酒.

In 1948, San Miguel acquired Hong Kong Brewers and Distillers Ltd., which was established by Jehangir Hormusjee Ruttonjee in Sham Tseng in 1930, and renamed The Hong Kong Breweries Ltd.. In 1963, the company name was changed to San Miguel Brewery Ltd. and was listed in the Hong Kong Stock Exchange SEHK: 236.

On March 25, 1994, the company adopted its present name, San Miguel Brewery Hong Kong Ltd. (SMBHK). In 1996, the Sham Tseng facility was closed down and its new brewery in Yuen Long was inaugurated.

== Products ==
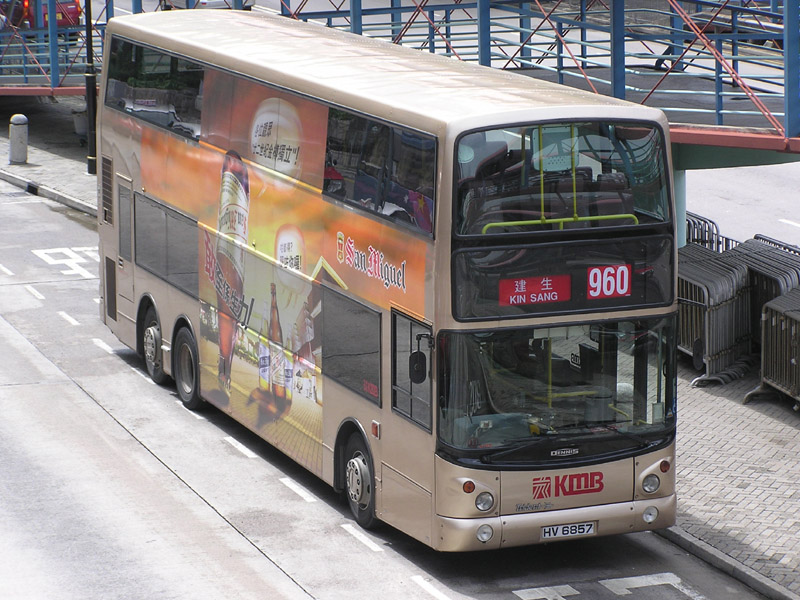
An advertisement for San Miguel on a bus

- San Miguel Pale Pilsen - domestic
- San Miguel Pale Pilsen - imported from the Philippines
- San Miguel Premium All-Malt
- San Mig Light
- San Miguel Cerveza Negra
- Blue Ice
- Brück
- Knight
- Polar Ice
- Valor

Other brands:

- James Boag's
- Samuel Adams
- Kirin Ichiban
- Kirin Lager
- Kirin Stout

Distributor of Anheuser-Busch InBev brands (1999 until December 31, 2014):

- Beck's
- Boddingtons
- Hoegaarden
- Leffe
- Löwenbräu
- Stella Artois

Distributor of Anheuser-Busch InBev brands (2011 until November 17, 2014):

- Budweiser
- Harbin

Southern China:

- San Miguel Pale Pilsen
- San Mig Light
- San Miguel Draught
- Red Horse Beer
- Valor
- Valor Light
- Guang's YES Beer
- Guang's Pineapple Beer
- Double Happiness Beer
- Dragon Beer
- Dragon Gold Beer
- Dragon Platinum Beer

== Subsidiaries ==
- San Miguel (Guangdong) Brewery Company Ltd.
- Guangzhou San Miguel Brewery Company Ltd.

== See also ==
- San Miguel Brewery
- San Miguel Corporation
- Beer in Hong Kong
- List of companies of Hong Kong
