= Ginebra San Miguel =

Subsidiary of San Miguel Corporation

Ginebra San Miguel, Inc.
- Formerly: La Tondeña Inc. (1902–1987); La Tondeña Distillers Inc. (1987–2003)
- Type: Subsidiary
- Traded as: PSE: GSMI
- Founded: 1834; 192 years ago 1902; 124 years ago
- Founder: Carlos T. Palanca, Sr.
- Headquarters: San Miguel Properties Centre, St. Francis Street, Mandaluyong, Metro Manila, Philippines
- Area served: Philippines
- Key people: Ramon S. Ang (President); Cynthia M. Baroy (Vice President, OIC – General Manager)
- Products: Distilled beverages
- Owner: San Miguel Corporation
- Parent: San Miguel Food and Beverage
- Website: www.ginebrasanmiguel.com

Ginebra San Miguel (beverage)
- Type: Dutch-type gin
- Manufacturer: Ginebra San Miguel Inc.
- Origin: Philippines
- Introduced: March 10, 1834; 192 years ago
- Alcohol by volume: 40%
- Proof (US): 80
- Colour: Clear
- Website: www.ginebrasanmiguel.com

Ginebra San Miguel, Inc. (Tagalog: [hɪˈnɛbɾa sɐn mɪˈɡɛl] hin-EH-brah; GSMI), formerly La Tondeña Distillers, Inc., is a Philippines-based diversified beverage company majority-owned by San Miguel Food and Beverage, Inc.

== History ==
La Tondeña was established in 1902 by Carlos T. Palanca, Sr. in Tondo, Manila and incorporated as La Tondeña, Inc. in 1929. The company name was inspired from its location. The distillery pioneered the production of alcohol derived from molasses, instead of the commonly used nipa palm.

In 1924, it acquired the Ayala Distillery (Destilería Ayala) from Ayala y Compañía (precursor of Ayala Corporation). In 1955, the company acquired Añejo Rhum from Tabacalera (Compañía General de Tabacos de Filipinas). In 1957, it acquired the trademark rights to Kulafu to launch Vino Kulafu Chinese herbal wine.

La Tondeña Distillers, Inc. (LTDI) was incorporated in 1987 by San Miguel Corporation after acquiring the assets of La Tondeña, Inc. from the Palanca family. The company changed its corporate name Ginebra San Miguel, Inc. (GSMI) on March 7, 2003.

On November 6, 2017, San Miguel Corporation announced the consolidation of its beverage businesses into San Miguel Pure Foods Company, Inc. through a share swap deal. San Miguel Pure Foods will acquire 216.97 million shares in GSMI from San Miguel Corporation. As a result, San Miguel Pure Foods will own 76% of GSMI with San Miguel Corporation as the minority owner. After the consolidation, San Miguel Pure Foods will be renamed San Miguel Food and Beverage, Inc.

=== Ginebra San Miguel brand history ===
In June 1834, Casa Róxas (the partnership that was the ultimate precursor of now Ayala Corporation) established the Destileria de Ayala y Cía (Ayala & Co's Distillery), the first distillery in the Philippines. It produced a variety of drinks including anis, anisette, cognac, rum, whisky and gin (Ginebra Ayala, Ginebra San Miguel, Ginebra Nacional, Ginebra Extra, Ginebra Doble Extra, among others). The distillery was located in Quiapo, Manila and was a major business of the partnership that was renamed to Ayala y Compañía (legal name before being converted into a corporation) when it was acquired by La Tondeña on June 21, 1924.

==== Legal issues ====
In the 2024 trademark infringement case, the Court of Appeals reversed the IPOPHL's decision and ruled that Duke Frasco cannot use “Frasco” as trade name on his company's bottled water and containers since it resulted in patent infringement of the registered trademark Frasco used by GSMI's on its gin label.

=== Calendar girls ===
The annual tradition of releasing calendars featuring female celebrities started in 1988 which they named the Ginebra San Miguel Super Angels. This was inspired by the US TV series Charlie’s Angels. These calendars are used as promotional material which are widely displayed in barbershops, sari-sari stores, mini-groceries and other venues frequented by liquor consumers.

== Brands ==
=== Current ===
- Ginebra San Miguel
- GSM Blue
- GSM Blue Flavors
- GSM Premium Gin
- 1834 Premium Distilled Gin
- Arcanghel Reserve
- Primera Light Brandy
- Freedom Island Light Rum
- Vino Kulafu
- Antonov Vodka
- G&T Ultralight Cocktails
- VYB Alcofizz Agave Lime (formerly known as Antonov Ready-to-Drink and Infinit Ready To Drink Cocktails)

=== Discontinued ===
- Gordon's Premium Gin
- Anejo Gold Rum
- Don Enrique Mixkila
- Tondeña Manila Rum
- Infinit Ready To Drink Cocktails
- MiXX
- Gran Matador Brandy
- Gran Matador Light Brandy
- Gran Matador Primo
- Ginebra Matador
- Barako Bull
- Vino San Miguel
- Antonov Vodka (apple)
- Antonov Vodka (flavored)
- Magnolia Purewater (moved to San Miguel Brewery since 2015 and discontinued on late 2017)
- Magnolia Lifedrink
- Magnolia Healthtea (moved to San Miguel Brewery since 2015)
- Magnolia Fruit Drink (moved to San Miguel Brewery since 2015)
- Berri Juice (moved to San Miguel Brewery since 2015 and discontinued on late 2017)
- First Pure Drinking Water
- Viva! Mineral Drinking Water
- Magnolia Hi-C
- Magnolia Fun-Chum
- Magnolia Junior Juice
- Magnolia Zip
- Magnolia Freshing Lite
- Eight O'Clock
- Ponkana
- Ice Cold Mix
- Earth & Sky
- Wilkins Distilled Drinking Water
- San Miguel Bravo Rum
- Ginebra San Miguel Blue (renamed known as GSM Blue)
- Ginebra San Miguel Red (returned to Ginebra San Miguel)
- Sugarland JellyAce

== Monde Selection awards ==
GSMI has received eight Quality Awards (five golds and three silvers) at the 2012 World Quality Selections, organized yearly by Monde Selection. Three of the brands have also earned the Monde Selection's International High Quality Trophy, granted to products achieving Grand Gold or Gold Awards for three consecutive years.

== Sports team ==
- Barangay Ginebra San Miguel (PBA)

== See also ==
- 1975 La Tondeña strike
