= San Miguel Beer =

Brand of beer

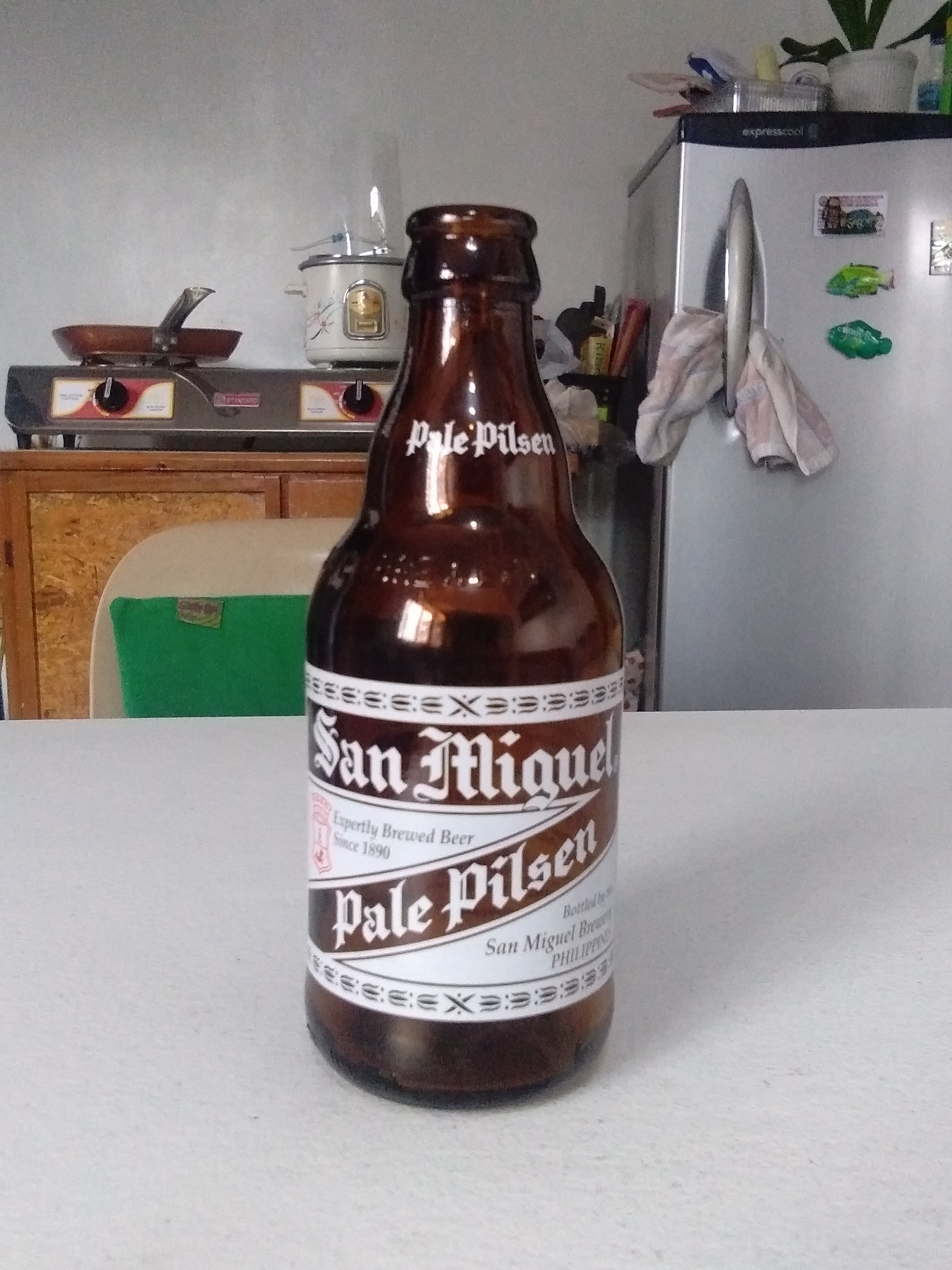
- Type: Pale lager
- Manufacturer: San Miguel Brewery (a subsidiary of San Miguel Food and Beverage)
- Origin: Philippines, San Miguel, Manila
- Introduced: 1890; 136 years ago
- Alcohol by volume: 5%
- Variants: San Miguel Premium All-Malt Beer, San Miguel Super Dry, San Miguel Flavored Beer, Cerveza Negra (San Miguel Dark Beer)
- Website: www.sanmiguel.com/en/

San Miguel Beer refers to San Miguel Pale Pilsen, a Filipino pale lager and flagship beer of the San Miguel Brewery. The original San Miguel Brewery, Inc. was founded in San Miguel, Manila, as La Fábrica de Cerveza San Miguel in 1890 by Enrique María Barreto under a Spanish Royal Charter that officially permitted the brewing of beer in the Philippines. Barretto was soon joined by Pedro Pablo Roxas as managing partner, who brought with him a German brewmaster, Ludwig Kiene, as technical director. San Miguel Brewery was renamed San Miguel Corporation in 1964; the brewery was spun off in 2007 and became a subsidiary of San Miguel Food and Beverage.

San Miguel Pilsen is the largest selling beer in the Philippines and Hong Kong. It is known in Chinese-speaking markets as 生力啤酒 (pinyin: Shēng lì píjiǔ). San Miguel Beer was introduced in Spain by San Miguel Brewery in 1946. The Spanish rights were spun-off in 1953 by San Miguel Brewery and became an independent entity presently known as the Mahou-San Miguel Group.

== Varieties ==
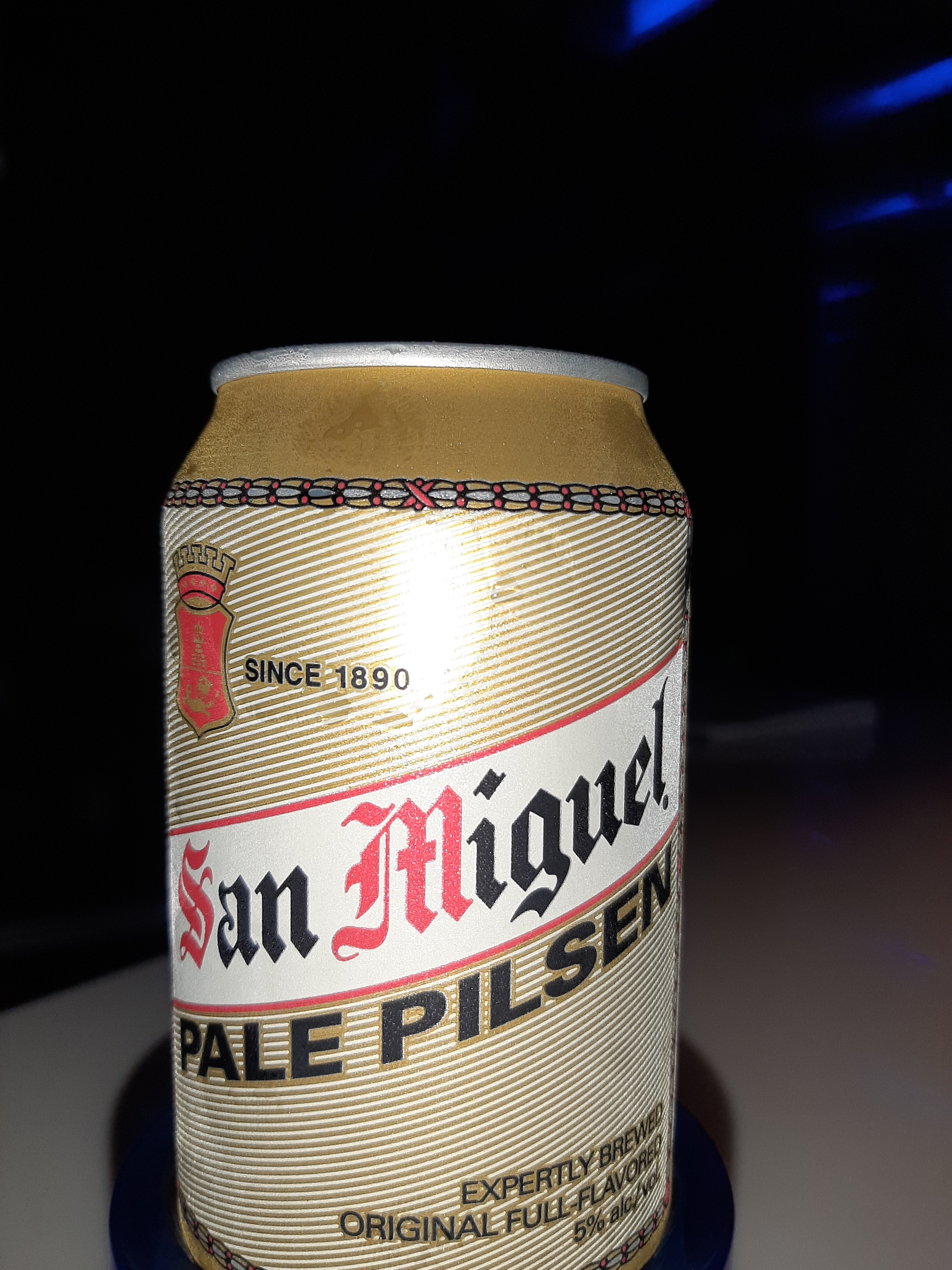
San Miguel Pale Pilsen

Branded as "San Miguel"

- San Miguel Pale Pilsen (San Miguel Beer) (5% ABV)
- San Miguel Premium All-Malt Beer (5% ABV)
- San Miguel Super Dry (5% ABV)
- San Miguel Flavored Beer (3% ABV)
- Cerveza Negra (San Miguel Dark Beer) (5% ABV)
- Red Horse Beer (San Miguel strong beer) (6.9% ABV)

Branded as "San Mig"

- San Mig Light (5% ABV in Philippines, 3.51% v/v in Indonesia)
- San Mig Strong Ice (6.3% ABV)
- San Mig Zero (3% ABV) The Zero in the name stands for zero sugar, rather than zero alcohol.
- San Mig Free 0.0 (0.04% ABV) This is the zero alcohol beer.

== San Miguel Beer (Spain) ==
As part of its overseas expansion, San Miguel Brewery moved into the Spanish market in 1953, setting up the company which would later become San Miguel Spain. Since 1946, there has been a company engaged in the production of malt for medicinal purposes known as La Segarra. In the early 1950s, its key shareholders Enrique Suárez Rezona, Ramón Vidal and Jaime Muñiz made contact with Andrés Soriano, then president of San Miguel Brewery, to allow their group to produce beer under the San Miguel name in Spain. In 1953, San Miguel Brewery, Inc. signed the "Manila Agreement" to establish a new brewery, La Segarra, S.A., in Spain. The company would later be renamed San Miguel Fabricas de Cerveza y Malta, S.A. in 1957, as an affiliate of San Miguel Brewery, Inc. which initially held 20% equity share via its Hong Kong subsidiary. In February 2014, San Miguel Corporation and Mahou-San Miguel signed a co-operation agreement to promote jointly San Miguel Beer and expand its global footprint.

== The escudo ==
The San Miguel escudo (seal) used as the brand logo of all San Miguel branded beer products is based on the original Spanish-era coat of arms of Manila. It is also the corporate logo of San Miguel Corporation and the San Miguel Brewery companies.

== San Miguel Beermen ==
The San Miguel Beermen are a professional basketball team in the Philippine Basketball Association (PBA). The franchise is owned by the San Miguel Corporation (SMC) since 1975. It is one of three PBA ball clubs owned by the SMC group of companies along with the Magnolia Hotshots and Barangay Ginebra San Miguel. It is the only remaining original franchise in the PBA and leads the league with the most number of PBA titles, with 30 to date. It is also the only team ever to have won at least one title in each of the five numerical decades of the PBA's existence so far.

== See also ==
- Beer in the Philippines
