= Beer in the Philippines =

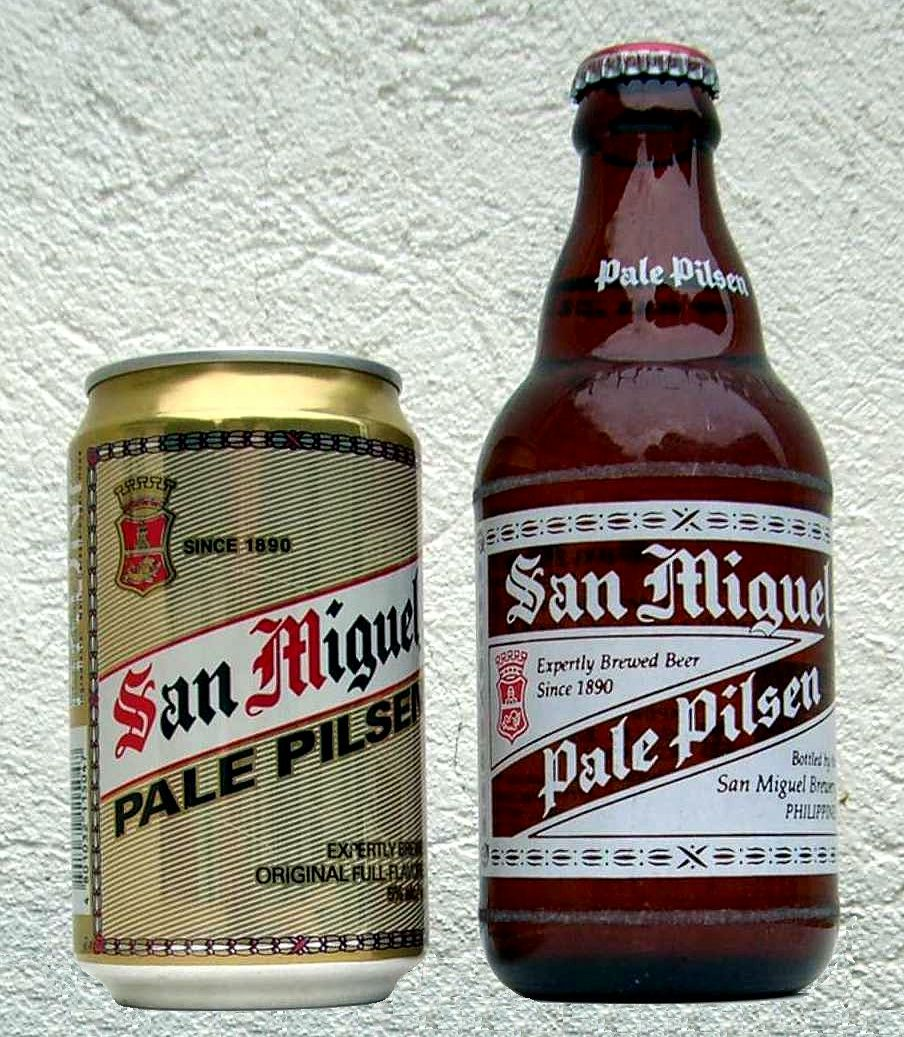
San Miguel Pale Pilsen

Beer in the Philippines is mainly produced by two large breweries, San Miguel Corporation, which produces San Miguel Pale Pilsen, and Asia Brewery, the country's second-largest brewery. In addition, there are a number of microbreweries across the nation.

Beer is the most-consumed alcoholic beverage in the Philippines and amounted to a 70% share of the domestic alcoholic drink market in terms of volume during 2005. Between 2003 and 2004, the Philippines had the world's fastest beer consumption growth rate at 15.6%. With a rise in consumption volume from 1.22 to 1.41 million liters, it was the 22nd largest beer market in the world in 2004. Consumption per capita averages 20 liters per year.

== History ==
Under a royal grant from Spain, Don Enrique María Barretto de Ycaza y Esteban opened La Fabrica de Cerveza de San Miguel, Southeast Asia's first brewery, on 29 September 29 1890 at 6 Calzada de Malacañan in Manila, near the Malacañan Palace, at the time the residence of the Philippines' Governor-General. The trade-name San Miguel originates from the brewery of San Miguel, Barcelona, Spain. Barretto named the company after the section of Manila where he lived and worked. Aside from the flagship brew, it also produced several brews that have since almost disappeared, including Double Bock, Cerveza Negra, Foreign Stout, Gold Ribbon, Extra Stout, Imported Pilsner Type, and Super Bock.

Barretto was soon joined by Pedro Pablo Roxas as managing partner, who brought with him a German brewmaster, Ludwig Kiene, as technical director. San Miguel's brew won its first major award at 1895's Philippines Regional Exposition. After operating for six years, the fledgling brewery was outselling imported brands five to one. At the outbreak of World War I, San Miguel was exporting its beer to Hong Kong, Shanghai and Guam. The company was incorporated in 1913.

During the American and the Commonwealth era, other beer producers like the Oriental Brewery and Ice Company were set up only to be acquired by San Miguel in its expansion. As part of engaging business in the prewar era, Japanese entrepreneurs in the mid-1930s founded the Balintawak Beer Brewery in Polo, Bulacan with capital from the Mitsui Bussan trading company and other Japanese investors.

When the Pacific War broke out in the 1940s, the Japanese military seized San Miguel in order to produce beer for its armed forces, and along with the Japanese-owned Balintawak Beer Brewery, used up their supply of raw materials, forcing them to resort to importing materials from Manchuria. After the country's liberation, Don Andres Soriano reclaimed San Miguel Brewery and gave away all of Balintawak Brewery's remaining inventory to American and Filipino troops rather than bottle it under San Miguel's label. In two short weeks of revelry the inventory was consumed. Eventually, Soriano brought the entire Balintawak Beer Brewery and it became known as the Polo Brewery as part of San Miguel's rehabilitation and expansion.

A short-lived beer, Halili Beer was made by F.F. Halili Enterprises, a company established by former Bulacan Governor Fortunato Halili. The company, whose brewery was built along Balintawak in Quezon City, also owned other products and business ventures including Mission Beverages, Goody Rootbeer and Halili Transit. It died off for unknown reasons, but it was speculated that none of the surviving sons of the founder took over the business. It was also speculated that San Miguel Brewery was threatened by Halili Beer, and bought out its stock.

In 1978, the San Miguel Brewery introduced one-liter bottles of San Miguel Beer, called "Grande".

The second brewer, Asia Brewery, Inc., was established by Lucio Tan on 27 January 1982, with inauguration of its brewery in Cabuyao, Laguna and launch of its first brand, Beer Hausen Pale Pilsen. San Miguel responded with Lagerlite, a light beer, Red Horse, an extra-strong beer, and Gold Eagle, a low-cost beer. Asia Brewery responded with Max Beer, an extra strong beer, Manila Beer, a low-cost beer, and Carlsberg (under license), marketed as a premium beer. San Miguel Brewery responded with a low-cost, smaller-sized variant of Red Horse, called "Colt", and San Miguel Beer, called "Miguelito", San Miguel NAB, a non-alcoholic version of San Miguel Beer (now discontinued), and San Miguel Super Dry, marketed against Carlsberg. Asia Brewery responded with Beer Pale Pilsen, now known as Beer Na Beer. Its design resembled the competitor's flagship brew, San Miguel Beer Pale Pilsen, for which San Miguel Brewery sued Asia Brewery.

In 1992, San Miguel introduced a 330 ml bottle of Red Horse, called "Stallion". San Miguel continues to produce new brands like Blue Ice (1993), an ice beer, Texas Beer (1993), a low-cost beer with low alcohol, and San Miguel Premium All-Malt (1995), which relaunched in 2007.

In 1994, San Miguel launched Cali, a brand of shandy that was popular with teenagers. Asia Brewery responded with Q Shandy, which reportedly had a higher alcohol content than Cali; Q Shandy has since been discontinued. San Miguel launched two variants of Cali: Cali Ice, an apple-flavored shandy, and Cali 10, a 10-calorie Cali. It has been marketed as a non-alcoholic sparkling beverage.

In 1996, two new variants of Red Horse were introduced, including "Mucho", a one-litre Red Horse, and a canned version as well.

San Miguel Corp expected to raise up to $616 million (approximately ₱26.8 billion) from selling shares of its flagship domestic beer group in the first half of 2008.

In 2011, San Miguel Corp accounted for 88% of Filipino domestic beer sales.

== Consumption ==
In general, the Filipino alcoholic drinks market showed dramatic volume growth in 2007, and beer contributed substantially to that growth. Its major beer producer, San Miguel, developed a strong marketing campaign to boost domestic consumer drinking. San Miguel continued to lead as the key manufacturer in 2007, with smaller and emerging brewers vying for market share. Domestic beer remained one of the most popular alcoholic drinks in 2007 and sari-sari stores and independent food stores continued to be its main points of distribution. There are also "beerhouse" bar and restaurant establishments where beer is on offer. Filipino alcoholic drink consumption and sales were projected to expand positively in 2008. With increasing disposable incomes, a young demographic population was anticipated to drink beer. In terms of types of alcoholic drinks, beer and spirits continue to comprise the largest volumes.

== Companies ==
=== San Miguel Corporation ===
San Miguel Corporation is Southeast Asia's oldest and largest brewer.

=== Asia Brewery ===
Asia Brewery is the second largest brewer in the Philippines after San Miguel Corporation.

== See also ==
- Beer and breweries by region
