= San Miguel Brewery =

Philippine brewery

San Miguel Brewery, Inc.
- Type: Subsidiary
- Traded as: PSE: SMB (2008–2013)
- Predecessors: La Fábrica de Cerveza San Miguel (1890–1913); The first San Miguel Brewery, Inc. (1913–1963); San Miguel Corporation (beverage division, 1963–2007)
- Founded: July 26, 2007; 19 years ago
- Headquarters: 40 San Miguel Avenue, Mandaluyong, Metro Manila, Philippines
- Area served: Worldwide
- Key people: Ramon S. Ang (Chairman); Carlos Antonio M. Berba (President)
- Products: Beer, non-alcoholic beverages
- Net income: ▼PHP 17.455 billion (US$365.0 million)
- Owner: San Miguel Corporation
- Parent: San Miguel Food and Beverage, Inc. 51.7% Kirin Holdings Co. Ltd. 48.3%
- Subsidiaries: San Miguel Brewing International Ltd.
- Website: www.sanmiguelbrewery.com.ph

San Miguel Brewery, Inc. (SMBI) is a subsidiary of San Miguel Food and Beverage, Inc. (part of San Miguel Corporation) and jointly owned with Kirin Holdings Co. Ltd. The company is the Philippines' largest brewery with a market share of over 95% as of 2008, notably producing San Miguel Beer.

== History ==
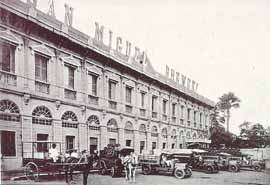
The original San Miguel brewery, circa 1915.

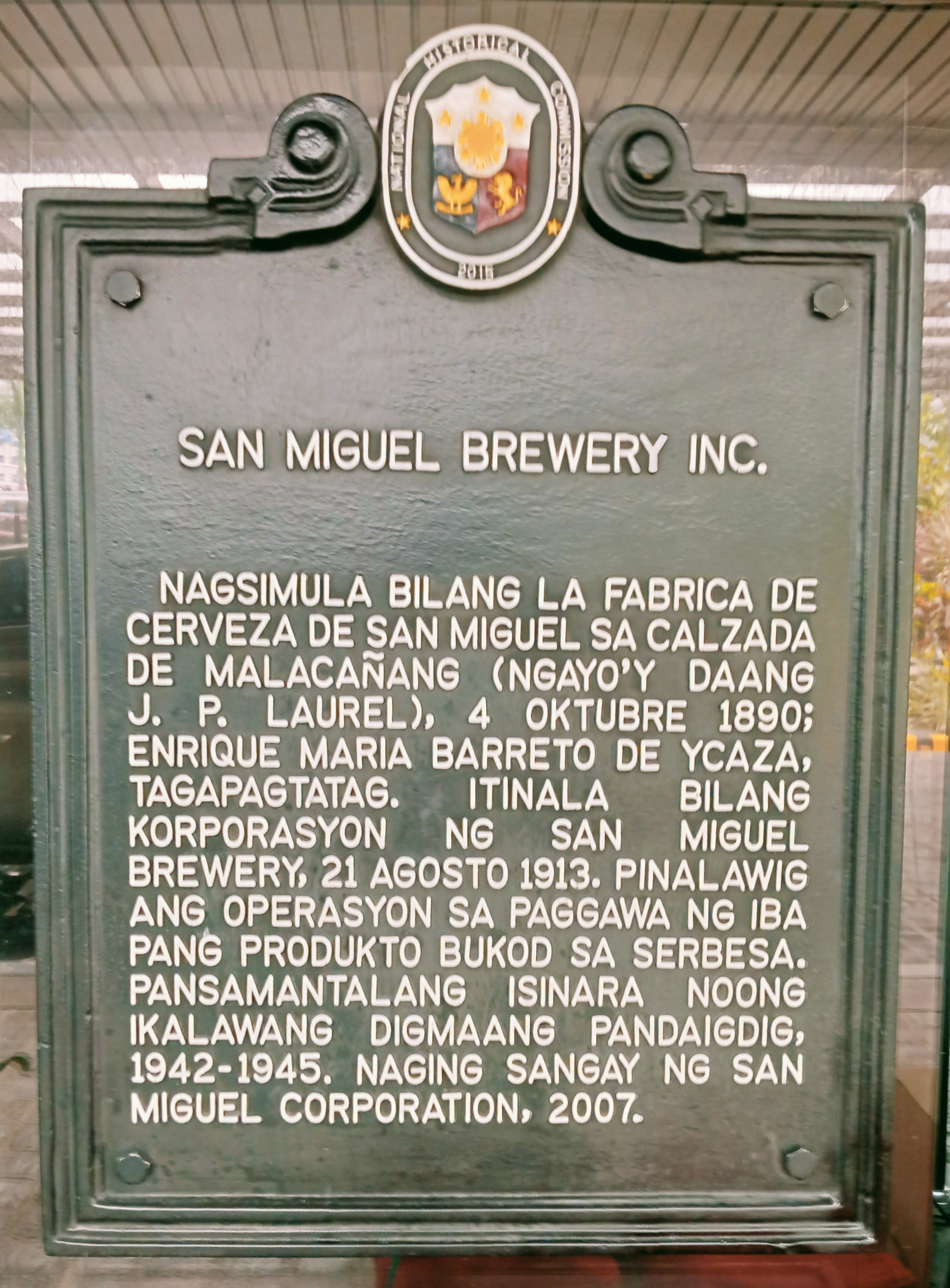
San Miguel Brewery Inc. Historical Marker

The first San Miguel Brewery, Inc. was founded as La Fábrica de Cerveza San Miguel in 1890 by Enrique María Barreto under a Spanish Royal Charter that officially permitted the brewing of beer in the Philippines. Barretto was soon joined by Pedro Pablo Roxas as managing partner, who brought with him a German brewmaster, Ludwig Kiene, as technical director. The business incorporated as San Miguel Brewery, Inc. in 1913. The company was renamed San Miguel Corporation (SMC) in 1963, having grown into one of the Philippines' largest business conglomerates with core interests in alcoholic and non-alcoholic beverages, food, and packaging. The breweries operated as the beer division of San Miguel Corporation until 2007.

The present San Miguel Brewery, Inc. was incorporated on July 26, 2007 as a subsidiary of SMC. The domestic beer business of SMC was spun off into San Miguel Brewery, Inc. on October 1, 2007. In 2009, Kirin Holdings Co. Ltd. of Japan acquired 48.3% of San Miguel Brewery, Inc. from SMC for PHP 8.841 per share.

In 2010, San Miguel Brewery, Inc. acquired 100% ownership of San Miguel Brewing International Ltd, enabling San Miguel Brewery, Inc. to achieve full integration of its domestic and international beer businesses. San Miguel Brewing International oversees operations in Hong Kong (San Miguel Brewery Hong Kong), People’s Republic of China, Indonesia, Thailand and Vietnam.

On November 6, 2017, SMC announced the consolidation of its beverage businesses into San Miguel Pure Foods Company, Inc. through a share swap deal, with San Miguel Pure Foods Company, Inc. acquiring 7.86 billion shares in San Miguel Brewery, Inc. from SMC. As a result, San Miguel Pure Foods Company, Inc. will own 51% of San Miguel Brewery, Inc. After the consolidation, San Miguel Pure Foods Company, Inc. will be renamed San Miguel Food and Beverage, Inc. The company held a special stockholder meeting on January 18, 2018, which approved the amendments to the Articles of Incorporation and the share swap transaction.

On March 23, 2018, the SEC approved the change in corporate name and amendments in the company's Articles of Incorporation.

=== Marker from the National Historical Commission of the Philippines ===
The marker of Fábrica de Cerveza de San Miguel was installed in 1950 at General Solano Street, San Miguel, Manila. It was installed by the Philippines Historical Committee (now National Historical Commission of the Philippines).

FABRICA DE CERVEZA DE SAN MIGUEL
FUNDADA POR D. ENRIQUE MARIA BARRETO DE YCAZA, 4 DE MARZO DE 1890, EN LA CALZADA DE MALACAÑANG, NUM. 6, AHORA AVILES NUM. 132. INAUGURADA, 4 DE OCTUBRE DE 1890. BENEDECIDA POR EL GOB. ECL. D. EUGENIO NETTAR Y APADRINADA POR EL CAPITAN GENERAL D. VALERISMO WEYLER, GENERALES FEDUCHI Y EL MARQUES DE AHUMADA. ADMINISTRADA SUCESIVAMENTE PRO D. ENRIQUE MA. BARRETO HASTA 1893; D. PEDRO F. ROXAS (SOCIO GESTOR), 1893-1896; D. ENRIQUE BRIAS DE COYA, 1896-1903; D. VICENTE FERNANDEZ, 1903-1910; D. ANTONIO R. ROXAS, 1910-1917; D. ANTONIO BRIAS ROXAS, 1917-1945; CORONEL D. ANDRES SORIANO DESDE 1919. EXTENDIO SUS ACTIVIDADES 1919.

On September 29, 2015, during the 125th anniversary of the founding of San Miguel Brewery, the National Historical Commission of the Philippines installed a historical marker on the San Miguel Headquarters in Mandaluyong.

SAN MIGUEL BREWERY, INC.
NAGSIMULA BILANG LA FABRICA DE CERVEZA DE SAN MIGUEL SA CALZADA DE MALACANANG (NGAYO’Y DAANG J.P. LAUREL), 4 OKTUBRE 1890; ENRIQUE MARIA BARRETO DE YCASA, TAGAPAGTATAG. ITINALA BILANG KORPORASYON NG SAN MIGUEL BREWERY, 21 AGOSTO 1913. PINALAWIG ANG OPERASYON SA PAGGAWA NG IBA PANG PRODUKTO BUKOD SA SERBESA. PANSAMANTALANG ISINARA NOONG IKALAWANG DIGMAANG PANDAIGDIG, 1942-1945. NAGING SANGAY NG SAN MIGUEL COPORATION [sic], 2007.

=== Philippine Stock Exchange (PSE) ===
San Miguel Brewery, Inc. became listed in the Philippine Stock Exchange (PSE: SMB) on May 12, 2008.

On January 2, 2013, trading of its stock was suspended when the rule on the minimum public ownership of listed shares took effect. On February 18, 2013, the company announced that its board of directors had approved the voluntary de-listing of the company from the stock exchange as well as a tender offer to buy back 94.24 million shares – representing the 0.61% public float. On April 24, 2013, the PSE board granted the petition for voluntary delisting filed by the company to take effect on May 15, 2013.

== Brands ==
- Alcoholic Beverages
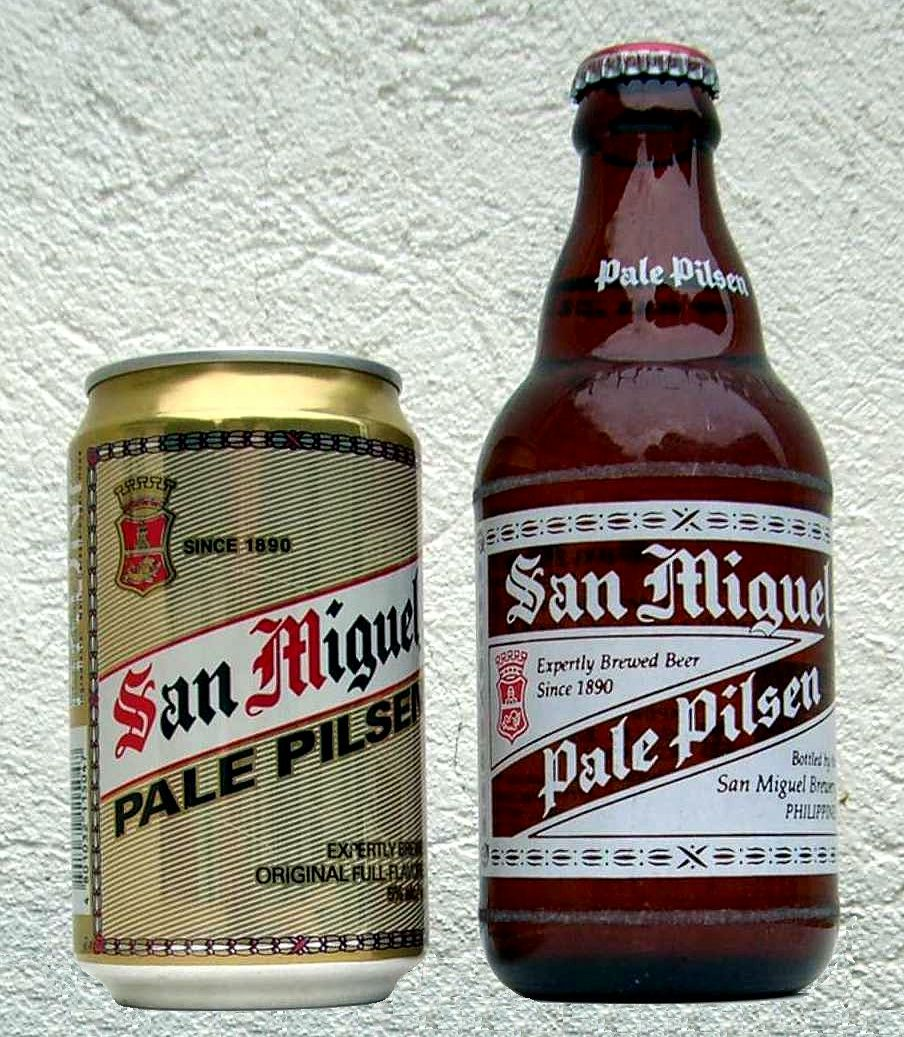
  San Miguel Pale Pilsen, SMC's Trademark Product
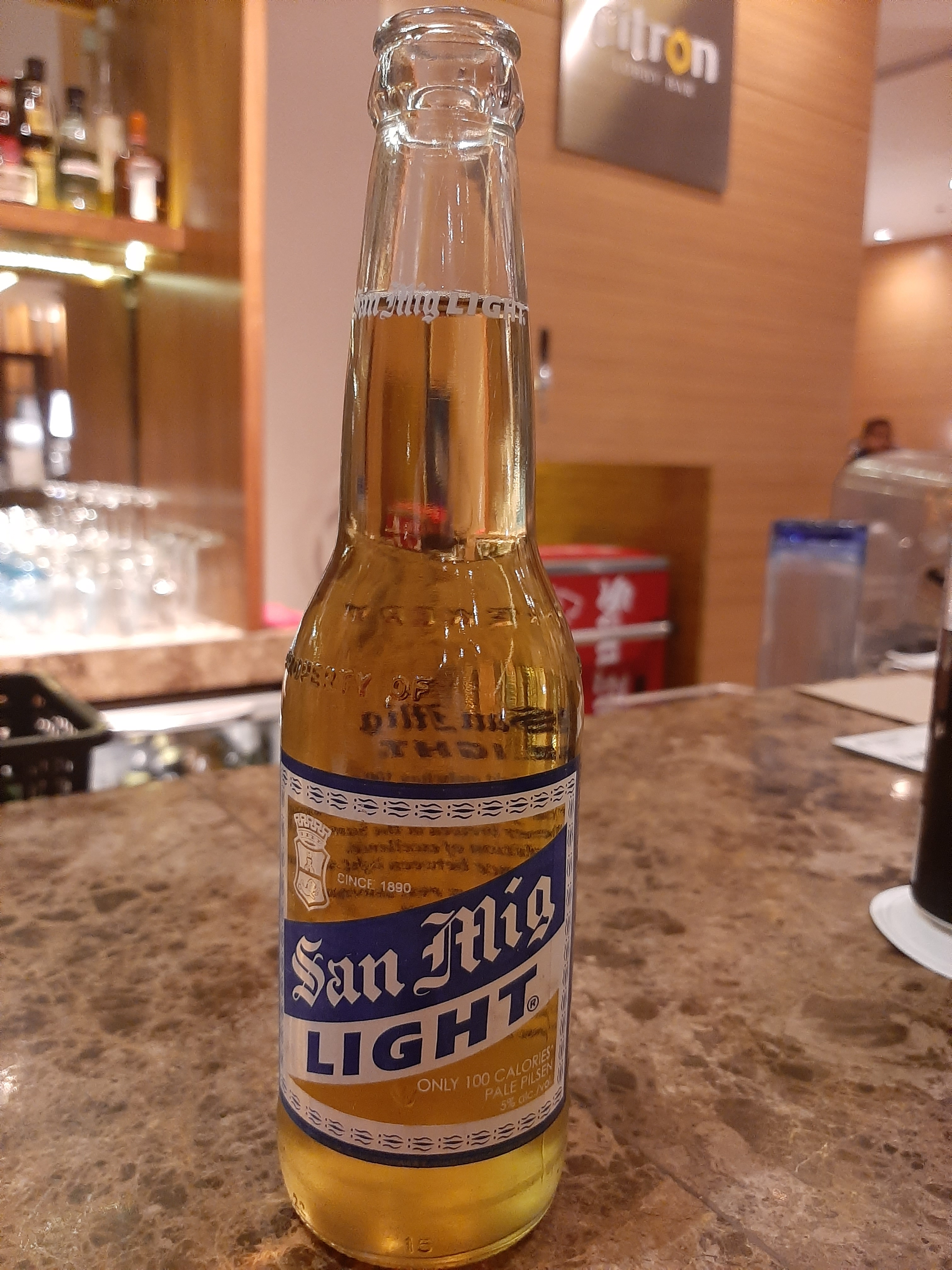
  San Mig Light. Low Carb (Low Calorie) full strength beer. Alc 5%z
  - San Miguel Pale Pilsen (San Miguel Beer)
  - San Miguel Premium All-Malt Beer
  - San Miguel Super Dry
  - San Miguel Flavored Beer
  - San Miguel Mango Yuzu (limited edition)
  - San Mig Light
  - San Mig Extra Light
  - San Mig Zero (zero sugar)
  - San Mig Hard Seltzer
  - San Miguel Cerveza Negra (San Miguel Dark)
  - San Miguel Cerveza Blanca (San Miguel Wheat Beer)
  - Kirin Ichiban
  - Gold Eagle Beer
  - Red Horse Beer
  - Red Horse Super
- Non-Alcoholic Beverages (NAB)
  - Magnolia Healthtea
  - Magnolia Cali Sparkling Softdrink
  - San Mig Free 0.0 (formerly known as San Miguel NAB)
- Discontinued
  - San Mig Strong Ice
  - San Miguel Oktoberfest Brew
  - Blue Ice
  - Lagerlite
  - San Miguel NAB (replaced with San Mig Free 0.0 since 2020)
  - San Mig Cola
  - Berri Juice
  - Magnolia PureWater
  - Agua Prima
  - Texas Beer
  - Bionade
  - Rain Malt Soda
  - Magnolia Fruit Drink
  - Cali 10 (renamed: Cali Light since 2004)
  - Cali Shandy (renamed: Cali Pineapple since 2004)
  - Cali Ice (renamed: Cali Apple since 2018)
  - Cali (as a malt beverage) (renamed: Magnolia Cali Sparkling Softdrink since 2022)
  - Royal Tru (sold/returned to Coca-Cola Philippines since 2007)
  - Sprite (sold/returned to Coca-Cola Philippines since 2007)
  - Coca-Cola (sold/returned to Coca-Cola Philippines since 2007)
  - San Mig/Magnolia Flavored Water
  - Sarsi (sold/returned to Coca-Cola Philippines since 2007)
  - Pop Cola (sold/returned to Coca-Cola Philippines since 2007)
  - Cheers (sold/returned to Coca-Cola Philippines since 2007)
  - Sparkle (sold/returned to Coca-Cola Philippines since 2007)
  - Jaz Cola (sold/returned to Coca-Cola Philippines since 2007)
  - Magnolia Dole
  - Magnolia Hi-C
  - Magnolia Fun-Chum
  - Magnolia Junior Juice
  - Magnolia Zip
  - San Miguel Chocolate Lager (limited edition since 2024)

== See also ==
- San Miguel Beermen
- San Miguel Beermen (ABL)
- Beer in the Philippines
