= San Miguel Food and Beverage =

Philippine food and beverage company

San Miguel Food and Beverage, Inc.
- Logo used since 2018
- Trade name: San Miguel Food and Beverage
- Formerly: Pure Foods Corporation (1956–2001); San Miguel Pure Foods Company, Inc. (2001–2018)
- Type: Private (1956–1971); Public (since 1971); Subsidiary (since 1981)
- Traded as: PSE: FB
- Industry: Food; Beverage
- Predecessor: San Miguel CampoCarne Corporation (1991–2001) (Note: San Miguel CampoCarne Corporation was a joint venture between San Miguel Corporation and Conservera Campofrío S.A. The company was formed as San Miguel Campofrío Corporation in 1991 and was renamed as San Miguel CampoCarne Corporation in 1992. After the acquisition of Pure Foods Corporation by SMC, the joint venture was absorbed into San Miguel Pure Foods Company, Inc. (now San Miguel Food and Beverage, Inc.) in 2001.)
- Founded: October 31, 1956; 69 years ago
- Founders: Joseph Henry Ng; Manuel Fong; Ismael Mathay Jr.; Lee Ngan; Pablo Cutaoco; Gregorio Tung; Miguel Ortigas
- Headquarters: 100 E. Rodriguez Jr. Avenue, Barangay Ugong, Pasig, Metro Manila, Philippines
- Area served: Worldwide
- Key people: Ramon S. Ang (Chairman); John Paul L. Ang (President and CEO); Emmanuel B. Macalalag (COO for Food); Carlos Antonio M. Berba (COO for Beer); Cynthia M. Baroy (COO for Spirits)
- Products: Processed meat, processed fish, canned meat, canned fish, coffee, dairy products, flours, baking mixes, beverages and agricultural-based products
- Number of employees: 10,460 (2022)
- Parent: Ayala Corporation (1981–2001); San Miguel Corporation (2001–present)
- Subsidiaries: The Purefoods-Hormel Company, Inc. (Note: Joint venture with Hormel Foods Corporation.); Magnolia, Inc.; San Miguel Foods, Inc.; San Miguel Super Coffeemix Company, Inc.; San Miguel Mills, Inc.; San Miguel Foods International Ltd.; PT San Miguel Foods Indonesia Tbk.; San Miguel Brewery, Inc. (Note: Joint venture with Kirin Holdings Co., Ltd.); Ginebra San Miguel, Inc.
- Website: www.smfb.com.ph www.sanmiguelfoods.com

San Miguel Food and Beverage, Inc., (formerly known as San Miguel Pure Foods Company, Inc.), is a Philippine food and beverage company headquartered in Pasig, Metro Manila. It is the largest food and beverage company in the Philippines, with nearly 3,000 employees deployed in a nationwide network of offices, farms, manufacturing, processing and distribution facilities. The company evolved from Pure Foods Corporation and is a subsidiary of San Miguel Corporation (SMC).

== History ==
The company was incorporated on October 31, 1956 as Pure Foods Corporation, a manufacturer of processed meats marketed under the Purefoods brand name. Its incorporators were Joseph Henry Ng, Manuel Fong, Ismael Mathay Jr., Lee Ngan, Pablo Cutaoco, Gregorio Tung and Miguel Ortigas. Ayala Corporation acquired substantial shares in the company in 1965 and majority control in 1981.

In 2001, San Miguel Corporation (SMC) acquired Pure Foods Corporation from Ayala Corporation. Following the acquisition, the entire food division of SMC was consolidated under Pure Foods Corporation and the company was renamed San Miguel Pure Foods Company, Inc. Its integrated operations range from breeding, contract growing, processing, and marketing of chicken, pork and beef to the manufacture of refrigerated, canned and ready-to-cook meat products, ice cream, butter, cheese, margarine, oils and fats, as well as animal and aquatic feeds. It holds in its portfolio some of the most formidable brands in the Philippine food industry. Sixty per cent of its sales comes from poultry, feeds and meats; branded businesses, processed meats, coffee and dairy; and flour. As at July 16, 2013, San Miguel Pure Foods had a market share of over 40%, and is the Philippines' leading poultry producer.

On November 6, 2017, SMC announced the consolidation of its beverage businesses into San Miguel Pure Foods Company, Inc. through a $6.6-billion share swap deal. San Miguel Pure Foods Company, Inc. would acquire 7.86 billion shares in San Miguel Brewery, Inc. and 216.97 million shares in Ginebra San Miguel, Inc. from SMC. After the consolidation, San Miguel Pure Foods Company, Inc. would be renamed San Miguel Food and Beverage, Inc. San Miguel Pure Foods Company, Inc. held a special stockholder meeting on January 18, 2018, which approved the amendments to the Articles of Incorporation and the share swap transaction. After the consolidation, SMC intended to sell up to 30% of the company to foreign investors to raise roughly $3 billion for future investments. The sale would be done through a private placement in 2018.

On March 23, 2018, the Philippines' Security and Exchange Commission (SEC) approved the change in corporate name to San Miguel Food and Beverage, Inc.and amendments in the company's Articles of Incorporation. The company's PSE ticker symbol was changed to PSE: FB effective April 5, 2018.

Former logo as San Miguel Pure Foods from 2001 to 2018.

== Subsidiaries ==
- San Miguel Foods (group)
  - The Purefoods-Hormel Company, Inc. (joint venture with Hormel Foods Corporation)
  - Monterey Meatshop
  - Magnolia, Inc.
    - Sugarland Corporation
    - Golden Food and Dairy Creamery Corporation
  - Realsnacks Manufacturing Corporation
  - San Miguel Foods, Inc.
  - San Miguel Mills, Inc.
    - Golden Bay Grain Terminal Corporation
    - Golden Avenue Corporation
  - San Miguel Super Coffeemix Company, Inc. (joint venture with JDE Peet's' Super Coffee Corporation)
  - San Miguel Foods International, Ltd.
    - San Miguel Pure Foods Investment (BVI), Ltd.
      - San Miguel Foods Vietnam Company, Ltd. (formerly San Miguel Hormel Vietnam Company, Ltd. and San Miguel Pure Foods Vietnam Company, Ltd.)
  - PT San Miguel Foods Indonesia Tbk.
- San Miguel Brewery, Inc.
  - San Miguel Brewing International Ltd.
- Ginebra San Miguel, Inc.
- Former Subsidiaries/Divestments
  - Coca-Cola Bottlers Philippines Inc. (joint venture with The Coca-Cola Company)
    - Cosmos Bottling Corporation
  - La Tondeña Distillers Inc.
  - Magnolia-Nestlé Corporation (joint venture with Nestlé Philippines)
  - New Zealand Dairy Board
  - Philippine Dairy Products Inc.
  - San Miguel Campocarne Corporation
  - San Miguel Purefoods Company Inc.
  - Purefoods Corporation
    - Coney Island Ice Cream
  - San Miguel Snacks

== Sports team ==
- Magnolia Hotshots (PBA)
