= San Miguel Corporation =

Philippine multinational conglomerate

- Logo used since 2012. It is a revised version and variant of the 1999 logo.

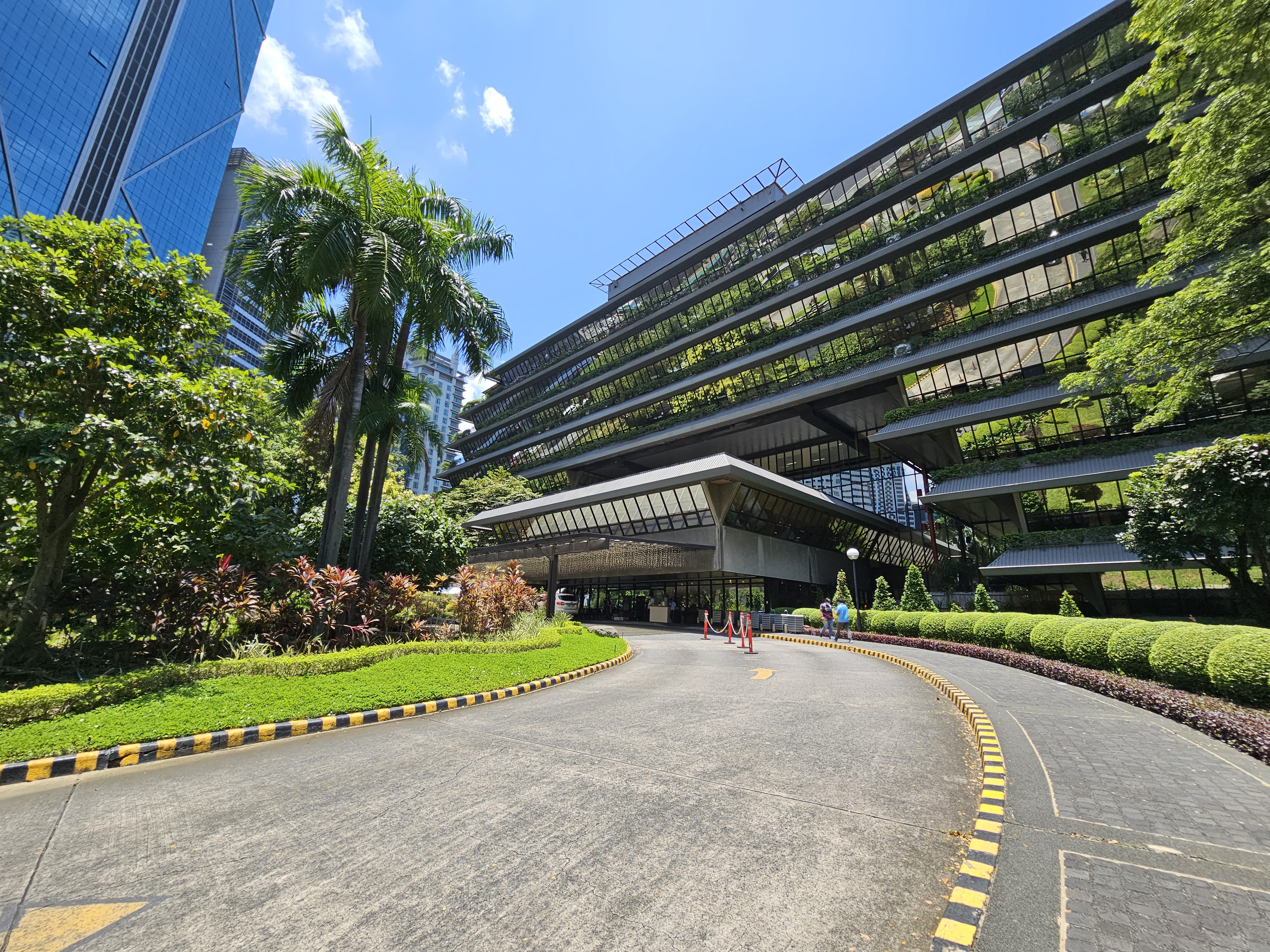
- Head office complex in 2023
- Trade name: San Miguel, SMC
- Formerly: La Fábrica de Cerveza San Miguel (1890–1913); San Miguel Brewery, Inc. (1913–1963)
- Type: Public
- Traded as: PSE: SMC
- ISIN: PHY751061151
- Industry: Conglomerate
- Founded: September 29, 1890; 135 years ago in Manila, Philippines
- Founder: Enrique María Barretto de Ycaza
- Headquarters: San Miguel Corporation Head Office, 40 San Miguel Avenue, Ortigas Center, Mandaluyong, Metro Manila, Philippines
- Area served: Worldwide
- Key people: Ramon S. Ang (Chairman and CEO); John Paul L. Ang (vice-chairman, president and COO); Ferdinand K. Constantino (CFO)
- Products: List: Automobile distribution; Energy; Food and beverage; Infrastructure; Packaging; Real estate; Transportation
- Brands: Ginebra San Miguel; Magnolia; Monterey; Petron; Purefoods; Red Horse Beer; San Miguel Pale Pilsen
- Revenue: ₱1.5 trillion (2022)
- Net income: ₱43.2 billion (2022)
- Number of employees: 45,500 (2022)
- Parent: Top Frontier Investment Holdings (Zóbel de Ayala and Ang families) (62.36%)
- Divisions: San Miguel Foundation Inc.
- Subsidiaries: Petron Corporation; San Miguel Food and Beverage, Inc.; San Miguel Equity Investments, Inc.; San Miguel Global Power Holdings Corporation; San Miguel Holdings Corporation; San Miguel Properties, Inc.; San Miguel Yamamura Packaging Corporation (joint venture with Nihon Yamamura Glass Company, Ltd.); Bank of Commerce
- Website: sanmiguel.com.ph

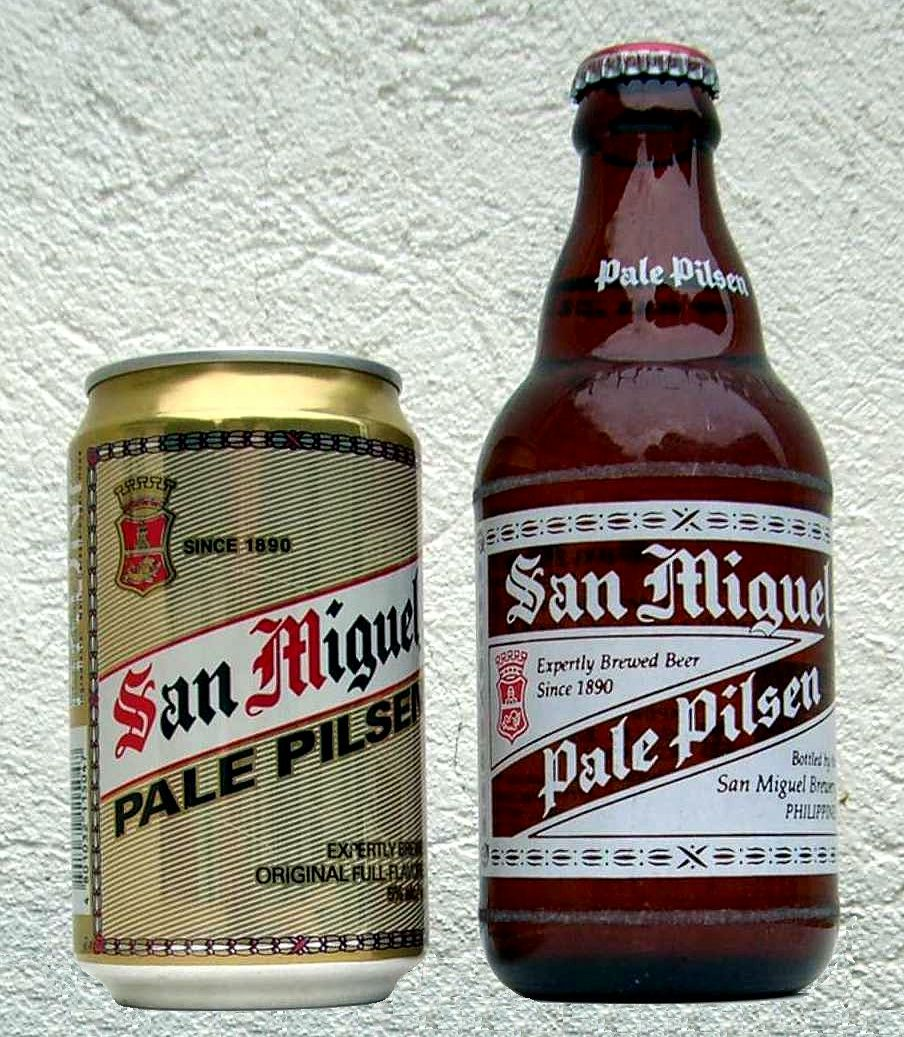
San Miguel Pale Pilsen, SMC's flagship product

San Miguel Corporation (Tagalog pronunciation: [sɐn mɪˈɡɛl]), abbreviated as SMC, is a Philippine multinational conglomerate with headquarters in Mandaluyong, Metro Manila. The company is one of the largest and most diversified conglomerates in the Philippines. Originally founded in 1890 as a brewery, San Miguel has ventured beyond its core business, with investments in various sectors such as food and drink, finance, infrastructure, oil and energy, transportation, and real estate.

Its flagship product, San Miguel Beer, is one of the best selling beers in the world. San Miguel's manufacturing operations have extended beyond its home market to areas such as Hong Kong, China, Indonesia, Vietnam, Thailand, Malaysia, and Australia. In total, its products are exported to 60 markets around the world.

== History ==
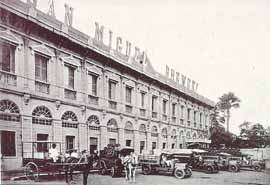
San Miguel's old Manila brewery

In 1889, a Manila businessman, Enrique María Barretto de Ycaza y Esteban, applied for a royal grant from Spain to establish a brewery in the Philippines. He was awarded the grant for a period of twenty years. On September 29, 1890 (Michaelmas, or the feast day of Saint Michael the Archangel), La Fábrica de Cerveza San Miguel was opened. Located at 6 Calzada de Malacañan (later renamed Calle conde de Avilés and presently Jose Laurel Street), the brewery took its name from the arrabal (suburb or district) where it was located, San Miguel, Manila. The facility had two sections: one devoted to the production of ice with a daily capacity of 5 tons, and the other to beer production. The brewery was the first in Southeast Asia to use modern equipment and facilities. With 70 employees, the plant produced 3,600 hectolitres (about 47,000 cases) of lager beer during the first year and subsequently produced other types of beer, notably Cerveza Negra, Eagle Extra Stout and Doble Bock.

Early success led to the expansion of the business and Barretto decided to incorporate his brewery. On June 6, 1893, the company was incorporated and registered with a capital of P180,000. Those forming the corporation were Barretto, Pedro Pablo Róxas y Castro (an ancestor of the Zobel de Ayala family), Gonzalo Tuasón y Patiño, Vicente D. Fernández y Castro, Albino Goyenechea, Benito Legarda y Tuáson and the heirs of Don Mariano Buenaventura y Chuidan.

Pedro Pablo Róxas was appointed manager, playing a prominent role in the development of the firm. He was the most active member of the firm until 1896, when he left for Europe. Prior to his departure, he acquired some of Barretto's shares in the company worth ₱42,000. After Barretto retired in May 1896, Róxas acquired the rest of Barretto's stake in the business. In 1895, San Miguel Beer won its first award as a product of the highest quality at the Exposición Regional de Filipinas. By 1896, San Miguel Beer was outselling all imported beers in the country at a rate greater than five-to-one.

The 1900s ushered in a period of prosperity after the Philippine Revolution and the beginning of the American Occupation. Demand for beer increased, so San Miguel, still under Róxas' leadership, commenced modernization of their operations including installation of electric conveyors and automatic machines. The brewery's equipment was fully modernised by 1910. During this era, the Order of Augustinian Recollects came into possession of a large amount shares in San Miguel Corporation.

=== Incorporated as San Miguel Brewery, Inc. (1913–1963) ===
By 1913, imported beer represented only 12% of the total consumption in the Philippines; San Miguel held an 88% share of the industry. Róxas died in Paris in 1913. Soon after, Benito Legarda and Gonzalo Tuasón made it advisable to change the form of the company from a firm of co-participants to a corporation (San Miguel Brewery, Inc.). Róxas's son, Antonio Róxas de Ayala, was appointed president, with Enrique Brías de Coya and Ramón J. Fernández as managers.

By 1914, San Miguel began to export, with its products finding ready markets in Hong Kong, Shanghai and Guam. When the First World War broke out, exports came to a temporary halt due to difficulties such as shortage of raw materials and the consequent rise in manufacturing costs. It was not until Prohibition was repealed in the United States that San Miguel was able to resume exports to Guam and later to Honolulu. By the end of 1914, Enrique Brías, after seeing that his efforts and industry had resulted in a progressive and prosperous business, retired from active business life in favour of his son, Antonio Brías y Róxas. In 1918, Antonio Róxas resigned from his position as president.

==== Andrés Soriano Sr.: 1918–1964 ====
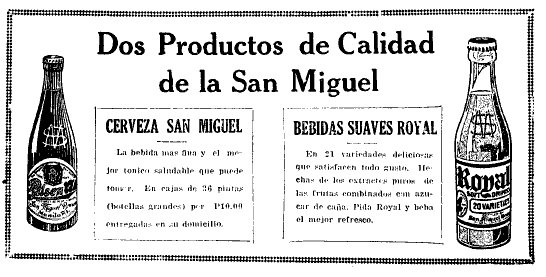
An ad that appeared in the January 17, 1924, edition of the Manila-based Spanish-language satirical magazine Aray

Andrés Soriano (a grandson of Pedro Pablo Róxas and a nephew of Antonio Róxas) joined San Miguel as a clerk in the accounting department. In 1918, after the resignation of Antonio Róxas, Ramón J. Fernández assumed the presidency and Soriano was made acting manager. In 1923, Soriano was appointed manager and managed San Miguel together with Antonio Brías y Róxas with increasing success.

Diversification into new lines of business began in the 1920s. In 1922, the company opened the Royal Soft Drinks Plant in Manila producing Royal Tru, other Royal products and aerated water. (In 1919, the company acquired the Oriental Brewery and Ice Company and transformed the building into an ice plant and cold storage; later the Royal Soft Drinks Plant.). Five years later, the company secured the rights to bottle and distribute Coca-Cola in the Philippines. In 1925, San Miguel went into the ice cream business with the purchase of the Magnolia Plant on Calle Avilés which was transferred a year later to a new site on Calle Echague (now, C. Palanca Sr. Street) in Quiapo District, Manila. This new site used to house the Fábrica de Hielo de Manila was bought by San Miguel in 1924. To achieve greater self-sufficiency in its operations, the firm opened a new plant in 1930 to produce carbon dioxide for its soft drinks products, and dry ice for the refrigeration needs of its ice cream products. In 1932, a plant was set up to produce compressed yeast for bakeries and medical use. The following year, the company leased the Insular Ice Plant from the government for a period of ten years.

During the 1930s, San Miguel began investing in businesses overseas. The company set up a short-lived dairy business in Calcutta, India and Singapore (Cold Storage Creameries, Singapore), and invested in breweries in the United States (a stake in the George Muehlebach Brewing Company and majority holding in the Lone Star Brewing Company located in San Antonio, Texas).

In 1939, the management structure of the company was reorganized to be more like other American corporations. San Miguel's management team was made up of the board of directors (president, vice-president, treasurer and nine directors and the executive officers of the corporation). Ramón J. Fernández was elected president of the board of directors and Antonio Róxas y Gargollo (a son of Antonio Róxas) was elected vice-president. Soriano was elected president of the corporation, with Antonio Brías y Róxas as vice president. Eduardo Róxas y Gargollo (another son of Don Antonio Róxas) and Jacobo Zóbel y Róxas were appointed directors. Expanding and modernizing the company, however, required the dilution of family control. San Miguel became the first Filipino company to be jointly owned by many shareholders. To retain control, Soriano relied on alliances with his Róxas relatives and associates.

Before World War II broke out, San Miguel built a glass factory in Paco and the Cebu Royal plant, its first installation outside Luzon. When the war reached the Philippines, Soriano was commissioned as a colonel and served as an aide to General Douglas MacArthur. One of the first Filipino brewmasters was Dominador San Diego Santos, a chemist from Obando, Bulacan.

After the war, San Miguel rebuilt and mounted a large scale expansion program. It acquired and modernized a second brewery in Polo, Bulacán (now part of Valenzuela City) in 1947. Two years later, five other plants were opened: the Farola glass plant and power plant (San Nicolas, Manila), a carbon dioxide plant in Otis Street (Paco, Manila), a carton plant and the Iloílo Coca-Cola plant. Exports of San Miguel Pale Pilsen resumed, and new soft drink plants followed in Davao and Naga.

In 1953, Soriano signed the Manila Agreement which allowed the Spanish company La Segarra S.A. to brew and sell San Miguel Beer in Spain. La Segarra S.A., renamed San Miguel, Fábricas de Cerveza y Malta (now Mahou-San Miguel Group) in 1957, was a separate, independent company that had exclusive rights to use the San Miguel brand in Europe.

=== San Miguel Corporation (1963–present) ===
==== Andrés Soriano Jr.: 1963–1984 ====
In 1963, the company's name was changed to San Miguel Corporation and moved to a new head office along Ayala Avenue in Makati.

Andrés Soriano died on December 30, 1964. At the time of his death, Soriano had parlayed his family's vast San Miguel fortune into mining, dairies, factories, a newspaper and a radio station. He had investments in Philippine Airlines, held the largest Coca-Cola franchise, and owned five insurance agency distributorships, a Kansas City brewery that made Lone Star and Colt 45, gold mines in British East Africa and a development company in Spain.

Following Soriano's death, Antonio Róxas y Gargollo was elected chairman and Andrés Soriano Jr. became president. Soriano Jr. would become chairman in 1967 and was credited with instituting modern management, including decentralization along product lines.

The Mandaue, Cebu complex was inaugurated in 1967 – its brewery and glass plant commenced operations a year later. Soriano Jr. continued to diversify the food business, building an ice cream plant in 1970 and expanding into poultry production in 1973 (it later added shrimp processing and freezing in 1984). By 1973, SMC sales exceeded a billion pesos for the first time and profits topped the hundred-million-peso mark.

A new corporate logo was adopted in 1975. The San Miguel escudo (seal), symbol of the royal grant, was retained as the logo of San Miguel Beer, its original grantee.

SMC encountered its first major competitor in the Philippine beer market in 1982 with the entry of Asia Brewery, Inc. The rivalry between Asia Brewery and SMC came to a head in 1988, when Asia Brewery cannily introduced a bargain-priced brand called simply, "Beer" (also known as Beer Pale Pilsen and "Beer na Beer"). The product looked and tasted like San Miguel Beer, playing upon the fact that in the Philippines, the San Miguel brand was synonymous with beer. It was a creative counter to SMC's notoriously aggressive and sometimes cutthroat competitive strategy, which had reportedly included "attempts to sabotage Asia Brewery's sales network and smash its empty bottles." Asia Brewery even hired away San Miguel's brew master.

At that time, the original San Miguel Brewery buildings in San Miguel, Manila were demolished upon transfer of ownership to the Philippine Government, and became part of the Malacañang Palace grounds. The site became a park while some became part of the government complex (as the new executive building).

In 1983, SMC sold its remaining minority interest in the Spanish company (San Miguel, Fábricas de Cerveza y Malta, S.A.). The Philippine and Spanish companies have been operated independently of one another. The Spanish company enjoyed success with San Miguel in its home market and throughout Europe.

==== Eduardo Cojuangco Jr.: 1983–1986 ====
Soriano's administration also witnessed the battle for corporate control. A thorny issue of management transparency broke Soriano's longstanding alliance with his Zóbel de Ayala relatives. This historical corporate battle resulted in the loss of effective control by the Sorianos, the Róxas de Ayalas and the Zóbel de Ayalas.

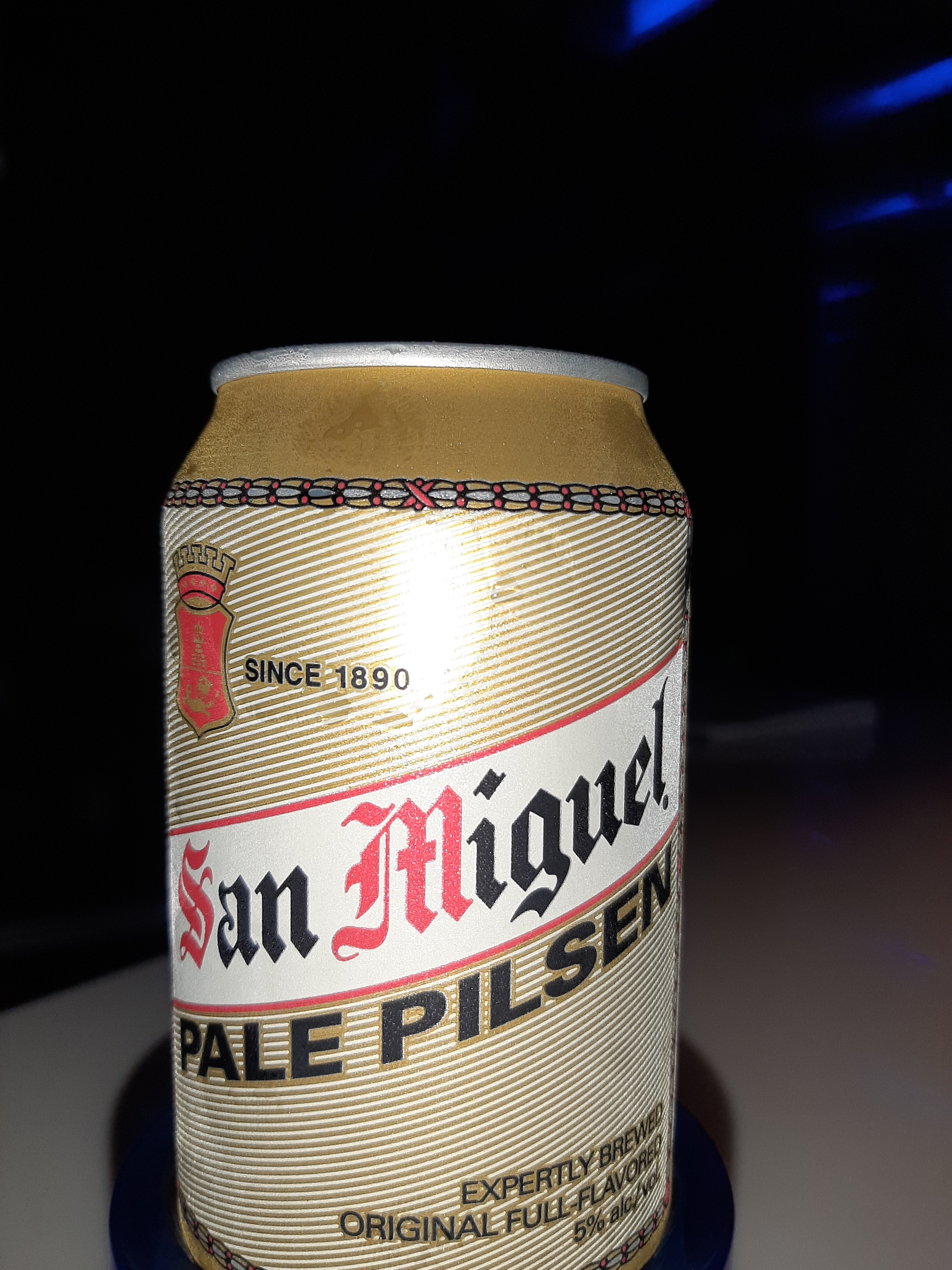
San Miguel Pale Pilsen can

In 1983, Enrique J. Zóbel, president of Ayala Corporation and vice chairman of the SMC board, instigated a takeover of SMC. The seeds of the family feud lay in the refusal of the Soriano management to share corporate information with Zóbel, particularly regarding contracts that SMC management was entering into with ANSCOR, a Soriano company. Soriano viewed his third cousin Zóbel as a rival, while Zóbel (holding nearly 20% of SMC stake) viewed Soriano (with about 7%) as mismanaging the company and engaging in sweetheart deals. Unable to oust Soriano, Zóbel sold his group's 19.5% stake to businessman Eduardo Cojuangco Jr., an associate of then President Ferdinand Marcos. Cojuangco's Coconut Industry Investment Fund (a.k.a., United Coconut Planters Bank) accumulated an additional 31% of SMC, giving him effective control of SMC and leaving the Soriano family with a mere 3%. Funds used by Cojuangco to acquire Zóbel's stake came from levies imposed by the Marcos dictatorship on coconut farmers. The Supreme Court has declared such levies to be public funds and therefore any assets bought using these funds are owned by coconut farmers. In the 1970s, then Philippine President, Ferdinand Marcos imposed a tax on the production of coconuts, a major Philippine cash crop, with the proceeds supposed to fund that industry's development. It was alleged, however, that the money was funneled into United Coconut Planters Bank, controlled by Eduardo Cojuangco Jr., which Cojuangco then used much of the funds to help him purchase his controlling stake in San Miguel in 1983. The controlling interest carried nine of SMC's 15 directors seats with it.

After Soriano's death from cancer on March 19, 1984, Cojuangco became the chairman of SMC. That same year, SMC moved to its new head office in Mandaluyong. Cojuangco brought coconut oil milling and refining operations into SMC's portfolio. His reign, however, was cut short when Marcos was toppled in 1986.

==== Andrés Soriano III: 1986–1998 ====
After the People Power Revolution in 1986, Corazón Aquino, Cojuangco's estranged cousin, became president of the Philippines. Aquino rode on the crest of widespread public outrage over the assassination of her husband, Benigno Aquino Jr., in 1983. One of the people blamed for her husband's death was Cojuangco, who fled on the same aircraft as Marcos to Hawaii in 1986. The Aquino administration sequestered Cojuangco's stake in SMC and agreed to let Andrés Soriano III, son of the late Soriano, run the company in spite of the Soriano family's holdings in San Miguel being a mere 1%.

Soriano launched a campaign to reclaim the family legacy, but when he tried to buy back the abandoned shares, he was blocked by the Aquino administration's Presidential Commission on Good Government (PCGG). The PCGG assumed control (but not legal ownership) of the 51.4-percent stake and refused to relinquish it. The government asserted that the stake had been illegally obtained. The PCGG continued to tend its SMC stake into the early 1990s, but it acceded de facto control of the conglomerate to Soriano via a management contract with ANSCOR. Soriano continued the company's program of expansion, acquiring majority control of La Tondeña, Inc., the leading producer of hard liquor in the Philippines, in 1987 and adding beef and pork production (Monterey Meats) to the company's food operations in 1988.

Soriano embarked on an internationalization program, hoping to expand into other countries and mitigate the effects of the Philippines' unstable economy. He also wanted to head off encroaching competition from the world's biggest breweries, namely Anheuser-Busch and Miller of the United States, Kirin of Japan, and BSN of France.

Soriano allocated $1 billion to a five-year strategic internationalization program that focused on shaping up domestic operations, then progressing to licensing and exporting, overseas production, and finally to distribution of non-beer products.

A subsequent decentralization created a holding company structure, with 18 non-beer operations positioned as subsidiaries. This corporate reorganization freed the spun off businesses from the bureaucratic shackles of a large conglomerate. In the course of this multifaceted effort to attain optimum efficiency, SMC reduced its workforce by more than 16%, from a 1989 high of 39,138 to 32,832 by 1993.

SMC then turned to the next stage in its internationalization: a beer licensing and exporting initiative. Although the company had exported beer for most of its history, this effort was intensified dramatically in the late 1980s. SMC's beer exports grew by 150% from 1985 to 1989 alone, and the brand was soon exported to 24 countries, including all of Asia's key markets as well as the United States, Australia, and the Middle East. Once the core brand was established in a particular market, SMC would begin to create production facilities, sometimes on an independent basis and sometimes in concert with an indigenous joint-venture partner. By 1995, SMC had manufacturing plants in Hong Kong, China, Indonesia, Vietnam, and had licensing partners in Taiwan, Guam and Nepal.

Thus, in spite of the overarching legal dispute over SMC's ownership (not to mention other problems endemic to operating in the Philippines), the company's sales quintupled from P12.23 billion in 1986 to P68.43 billion by 1994. Net income increased twice as fast, from P1.11 billion to P 11.86 billion over the same period, although its overseas operations (as a whole) were not yet profitable.

In 1996, SMC purchased full control of its Hong Kong arm, San Miguel Brewery Hong Kong Ltd. In April of the following year, SMC's domestic soft-drink bottling unit, Coca-Cola Bottlers Philippines, Inc., was merged into the Australia-based Coca-Cola Amatil Ltd. (CCA). In effect, SMC exchanged its 70-percent interest in a Philippine-only operation for a 25-percent stake in CCA, which had operations in 17 countries. CCA soon demerged the latter operations into a UK-based firm called Coca-Cola Beverages plc (resulting in a reduction of SMC's stake in CCA to 22 percent).

From 1995 through 1997, SMC suffered a downturn in its main domestic businesses, while overseas operations were still in the red. Profits plummeted. In response, a major restructuring of the company's loss-making food businesses was undertaken. SMC's Magnolia ice cream and milk business was merged with the Nestlé Philippines group to form Magnolia-Nestlé Corporation. By late 1998, SMC's stake in this business was acquired by Nestlé. SMC also exited from the ready-to-eat meal sector and curtailed the operations of its shrimp farming business. By late 1997, the company was also beginning to feel the effects of the 1997 Asian financial crisis.

==== The Cojuangco-Ang era: 1998–2020 ====
Following the assumption of Joseph Estrada as President of the Philippines on June 30, 1998, Andrés Soriano III resigned in July 1998 and Eduardo M. Cojuangco Jr. was elected chairman of SMC. Francisco C. Eizmendi Jr. stayed as president and chief operating officer and Ramón S. Ang was elected vice-chairman in January 1999. Ang was appointed president and chief operating officer following the retirement of Eizmendi in 2002.

Confronted by greater competitive pressures as a result of the 1997 financial crisis, the pace of change quickened for San Miguel upon Cojuangco's return. Amid an extremely difficult operating environment, working toward configuring the corporation to have better response to the highly competitive climate of the time. The immediate goals upon assuming leadership were to ease the burden of the spiralling interest expense, pursue new strategic alliances to strengthen the business - particularly in the international arena - and strengthen its profitability and financial standing to position the company for new opportunities. Progress was made on reducing costs, improving productivity and generating cash flow.

Having installed a critical mass of brewing capacity in China, Indonesia and Vietnam, the new management decided to continue the company's investments in these areas, aggressively focusing on brand and volume building initiatives, most especially in China. SMC revamped the selling and distribution organization resulting in higher distribution efficiency, improved coverage of key accounts, greater pricing stability and reduced overall costs. In China, the company chose to focus on growth markets while still reaching close to 30 cities. Whereas in the past, it had primarily concentrated on the premium market it now pushed its medium and low-end brands.

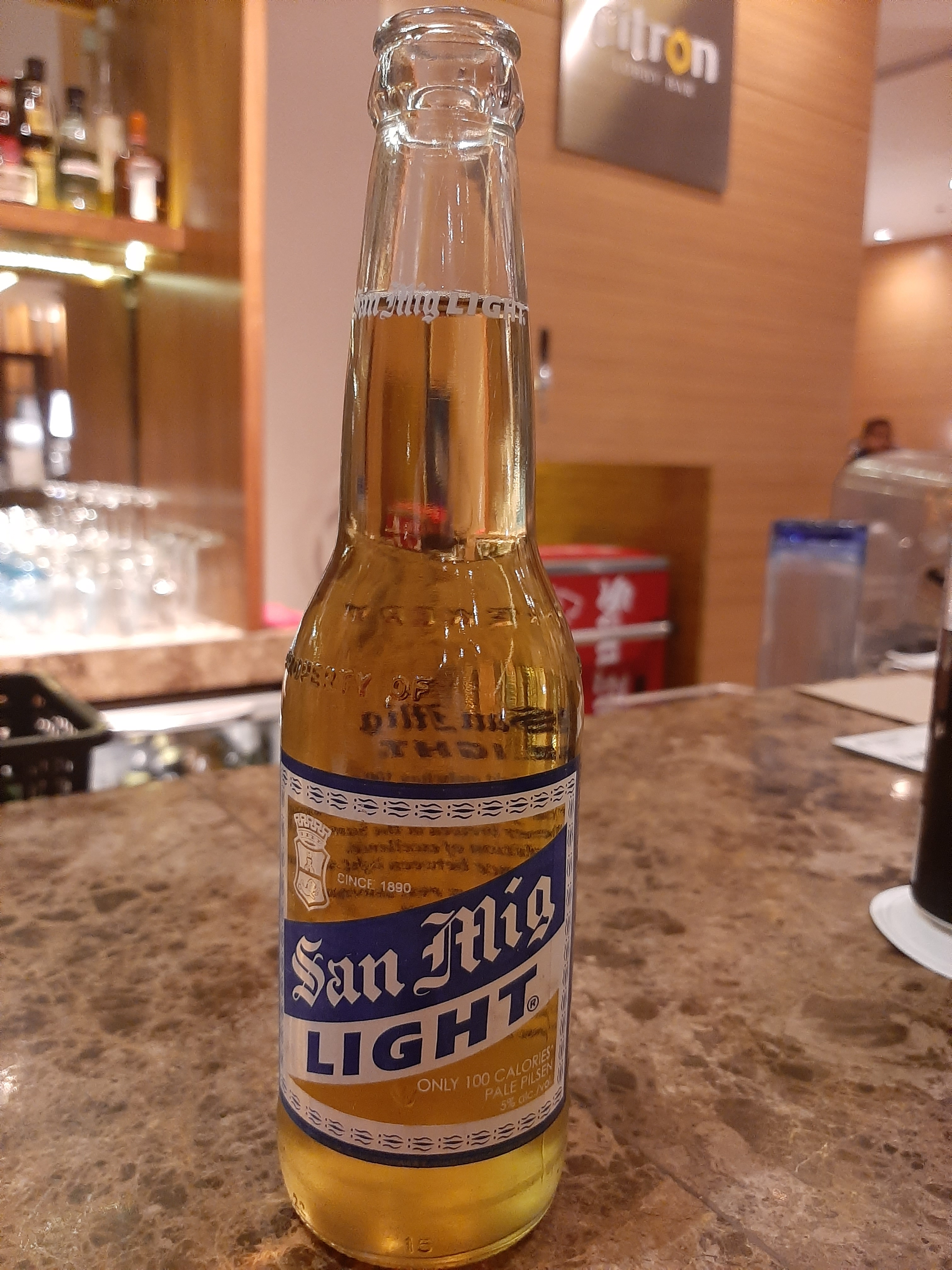
San Mig Light. Low carb (low calorie) full strength beer. Alcohol 5%.

By the end of 1998, Cojuangco sold SMC's stake in Coca-Cola Beverages plc (Coca-Cola Amatil's bottler in Europe), along with SMC's 45% stake in Nestlé Philippines.

In May, the San Miguel Brewing International (SMBIL) regional headquarters was transferred from Hong Kong to Manila and to reduce overhead expenses, the employees of SMBIL were repatriated. The group-wide logistics and purchasing functions were realigned at the corporate level. The food, liquor and international operations were recapitalized. Metro Bottled Water Corporation, manufacturer of Wilkins Distilled Water, was acquired. In February 2001, SMC re-acquired control of Coca-Cola Bottlers Philippines, Inc. Shortly after, SMC acquired Pure Foods Corporation, becoming the undisputed market leader in the Philippines' food industry, owning two-thirds of the refrigerated and processed meat market, and over a third of the poultry and feeds industries.

For the next three years, SMC bought six companies in four neighbouring countries. Its first major acquisition was Australian boutique brewer J. Boag and Son for A$96 million in 2000. To further its aims as a business, SMC took in Japanese brewer Kirin Brewery Co. Ltd., which acquired a 15-percent stake in SMC, for $540 million in 2002. SMC continued its international acquisitions, paying $97 million for Thai Amarit Brewery Ltd. and $35.5 million for food processor TTC (Vietnam) Co. in 2003. In 2004, it bought 51 percent of Berri Ltd., Australia's top juice maker, for $97.9 million. By 2004, international sales comprised 13 percent of total revenues from 10 percent the previous year. In 2005, the company made its biggest overseas acquisition with the takeover of National Foods Ltd., Australia's largest publicly traded dairy, which it bought for P80.38 billion. That was followed later in the year with its $420-million purchase of Singapore-based Del Monte Pacific Ltd., the region's largest pineapple canner. San Miguel merged National Foods' operation with Berri.

In 2006, SMC sold its 65% stake in Coca-Cola Bottlers Philippines, Inc. (including its subsidiaries Cosmos Bottling and Philippine Beverage Partners) to The Coca-Cola Company (TCCC) for $590 million. In November 2007, SMC sold Boag's to Lion Nathan for A$325 million. The same month, SMC also sold National Foods to Kirin for ¥294 billion.

In 2010, SMC acquired majority control of Petron Corporation.

In April 2012, SMC bought a 49% minority stake in Philippine Airlines (PAL) Holdings, worth US$500 million, to revitalize PAL and Air Philippines. On September 15, 2014, SMC sold its stake in PAL holdings for approximately $1.3 billion and relinquished management control back to the group of Lucio Tan.

SMC has also expanded its oil and energy business with the purchase of Esso Malaysia Berhad (65%), ExxonMobil Borneo Sdn Bhd (100%) and ExxonMobil Malaysia Sdn Bhd (100%) for US$577.3 million.

In October 2012, SMC bought back the 24% of SMC shares held by the government through Coconut Industry Investment Fund (CIIF) companies by paying CIIF P57.6 billion.

By 2017, Iñigo Zóbel, son of Enrique J. Zóbel, became the largest common stock shareholder of SMC owning 66.1% through his holding company, Top Frontier Investment Holdings, Inc.

On November 6, 2017, SMC announced the consolidation of its beverage businesses into San Miguel Pure Foods Company, Inc. through a $6.6-billion share swap deal. San Miguel Pure Foods Company will acquire 7.86 billion shares in San Miguel Brewery Inc. and 216.97 million shares in Ginebra San Miguel Inc. from SMC. After the consolidation, San Miguel Pure Foods Company will be renamed San Miguel Food and Beverage, Inc.

==== Ramon S. Ang: 2020–present ====
On June 16, 2020, Cojuangco died at the age of 85 due to heart failure and pneumonia.

On April 15, 2021, ten months following the death of Cojuangco, SMC amended its by-laws to unify the role, functions and duties of chief executive officer (CEO) to that of the president. Based on the PSE disclosure following the 2021 annual stockholders' meeting of SMC, Ang remains as vice-chairman, president (CEO) and COO of the company. As of the June 8, 2021, organizational meeting, the position of chairman of the board of directors remains vacant.

From August to September 2022, Iñigo U. Zobel sold a total of 86.432 million shares, this reduced his ownership to 1.487 billion shares or 62.36 percent.

On June 10, 2024, Ang became the chairman and CEO, and his eldest son, John Paul L. Ang, assumed the positions of vice-chairman, president and COO. SMC shall amend its by-laws to redefine the roles, functions and duties of the chairman and chief executive officer, and the president and chief operating officer, subject to stockholders and SEC approvals.

== Subsidiaries ==
=== San Miguel Food and Beverage ===
San Miguel Food and Beverage
- Industry: Food and beverage
- Area served: Worldwide
- Website: smfb.com.ph

San Miguel Food and Beverage (formerly San Miguel Pure Foods Company) is the largest food and beverage company in the Philippines. The company was incorporated in 1956 as Pure Foods Corporation, a manufacturer of processed meats marketed under the Purefoods brand name. In 2001, SMC acquired Pure Foods Corporation from Ayala Corporation and Pure Foods was renamed to San Miguel Pure Foods Company, Inc. The entire food division of SMC was consolidated under San Miguel Pure Foods Company, Inc. Its integrated operations range from breeding, contract growing, processing and marketing of chicken, pork and beef to the manufacture of refrigerated, canned and ready-to-cook meat products, ice cream, butter, cheese, margarine, oils and fats, as well as animal and aquatic feeds. It holds in its portfolio some of the most well-known brands in the Philippine food industry, among them, Magnolia, Purefoods, Monterey, Star and Dari Creme. Its B-Meg and Pure Blend brands are market-leaders in the animal feeds industry. Sixty per cent of sales for San Miguel Pure Foods comes from poultry, feeds and meats; branded businesses, processed meats, coffee and dairy; and flour. As of July 16, 2013, San Miguel Pure Foods has a market share of over 40 per cent, and is the Philippines' leading poultry producer.

On November 6, 2017, SMC announced the consolidation of its beverage businesses into San Miguel Pure Foods through a $6.6-billion share swap deal. San Miguel Pure Foods would acquire 7.86 billion shares in San Miguel Brewery Inc. and 216.97 million shares in Ginebra San Miguel Inc. from SMC. After the consolidation, San Miguel Pure Foods was renamed San Miguel Food and Beverage, Inc.

=== San Miguel Properties ===
San Miguel Properties Inc.
- Industry: Real estate
- Area served: Philippines
- Website: sanmiguelproperties.com.ph

San Miguel Properties was established in 1990 as SMC's corporate real estate arm. Its current projects include mixed-use developments, with economy to middle-income housing as its core products. Among its real estate development projects are Makati Diamond Residences (Makati); Emerald 88 (Pasig), Bel Aldea, Maravilla, and Muralla (General Trias, Cavite); Dover Hill (San Juan); One Dover View and Two Dover View (Mandaluyong); and Wedgewoods (Santa Rosa, Laguna).

=== San Miguel Yamamura Packaging Corporation ===
San Miguel Yamamura Packaging Corporation
- Industry: Packaging
- Area served: Philippines, United States, Europe, Japan, Australia
- Website: smypc.com

San Miguel Yamamura Packaging Corporation (SMYPC) provides packaging solutions to food, beverage, pharmaceutical, chemical and personal care manufacturers. It serves clients in the United States, Europe, Japan, and Australia among other foreign markets. Furthermore, the corporation also manufactures corrugated cartons, flexible packaging, plastic crates and pallets, metal closures and two-piece aluminium cans. In China, the company produces glass containers and plastic crates, pallets and metal crowns for the domestic and export markets. SMYPC also manages a plastic crate plant in Indonesia and a glass and metal crown facility in Vietnam. In Malaysia, it operates four facilities that produce flexible packaging, plastic films, woven products and radiant barriers for higher-value and high-tech industries such as electronics, health care and logistics firms.

=== Petron Corporation ===
Petron Corporation
- Industry: Fuel and oil
- Area served: Philippines and Malaysia
- Website: petron.com

Petron Corporation is one of the largest oil companies in the Philippines, supplying more than a third of the country's oil requirements. It operates a refinery in Limay, Bataan with a rated capacity of 180,000 barrels per day (29,000 m^{3}/d). From the refinery, Petron moves its products mainly by sea to 32 depots and terminals throughout the country. It is the sole oil refiner in the country after Pilipinas Shell exited the refining business.

=== San Miguel Global Power Holdings Corporation ===
San Miguel Global Power Holdings Corporation
- Industry: Electric utility
- Area served: Philippines
- Website: smcglobalpower.com.ph

San Miguel Global Power serves as the power arm of San Miguel Corporation.

- Sual Power Station (coal) 1,000 MW
- Ilijan Combined Cycle Power Plant (natural gas) 1,200 MW
- San Roque Dam (hydroelectric) 345 MW
- Masinloc Power Station (coal) 1,019 MW
- Limay Power Plant (coal) 600 MW
- Malita Power Plant (coal) 300 MW
- Angat Hydroelectric Power (hydroelectric) Plant 218-MW

As of 2025, more than 60% of Global Power's facilities are coal-fired plants, with fossil fuels in general comprising at least 75% of its total net sellable capacity.

=== SMC Infrastructure ===
San Miguel Holdings Corporation
- Trade name: SMC Infrastructure
- Industry: Infrastructure and transportation
- Area served: Philippines

San Miguel Holdings Corporation, doing business as SMC Infrastructure, is the infrastructure arm of San Miguel, managing several infrastructure projects in the Philippines.

==== Expressways ====
- Alloy Manila Toll Expressways, Inc.
- Atlantic Aurum Investments B.V.
  - SMC Skyway Corporation (Metro Manila Skyway I & II)
    - Skyway O&M Corporation
  - Stage 3 Connector Tollways Holdings Corporation
    - SMC Skyway Stage 3 Corporation (Metro Manila Skyway III)
- Cypress Tree Capital Investments, Inc.
- STAR Tollway Corporation (Southern Tagalog Arterial Road)
- SMC TPLEX Corporation (Tarlac–Pangasinan–La Union Expressway)
- Manila Toll Expressways Systems, Inc. (MATES)
- MTD Manila Expressways, Inc.
- Rapid Thoroughfares, Inc.
- SMC SLEX Inc. (South Luzon Expressway)
- Terramino Holdings, Inc.
- SMC NAIAX Corporation (NAIA Expressway)

==== Airports ====
- San Miguel Aerocity Inc., the operator of New Manila International Airport
- New NAIA Infrastructure Corporation, also known as SMC SAP and Co Consortium, composed of SMC, RMN Asian Logistics, RLW Aviation, and Incheon International Airport, private concessionaire of Ninoy Aquino International Airport from September 2024 to September 2039.
- Trans Aire Development Holdings Corporation (Godofredo P. Ramos Airport)

==== Other ====
- SMC Mass Rail Transit 7, Inc. (MRT Line 7)
  - Universal LRT Corporation (BVI) Limited
  - ULCOM Company, Inc.
- Luzon Clean Water Development Corporation (Bulacan bulk water supply project)
- Manila North Harbor Port, Inc. (Manila North Harbor)

=== Bank of Commerce ===
Bank of Commerce is a universal bank in the Philippines. Founded in 1963, SMC acquired the bank in 2008. The bank is the 16th largest bank in the country in terms of total assets.

=== San Miguel Integrated Logistics Services Inc. ===
San Miguel Integrated Logistics Services, Inc. (San Miguel Logistics), a subsidiary of San Miguel Corporation, is one of the Philippines’ leading logistics company that offers full range of transportation and logistics services to meet the needs of modern businesses.

Operations and Maintenance Group

- SMC Repairs and Maintenance Inc.
- SMC Integrated Farm Specialists Inc.
- San Miguel Integrated Merchandising Services Inc (SMIMSI)
- SMC Multi Services Inc.
- SMC Neuventures Inc.
- SMC Food Processing Inc.

=== Other subsidiaries ===
- Anchor Insurance Brokerage Corp.
- ArchEn Technologies Inc.
- Autosweep Post Corporation
- Challenger Aero Air Corporation
- Northern Cement Corporation (35% equity held under San Miguel Yamamura Packaging Corporation)
- Petrogen Insurance Corporation
- San Miguel Equity Securities, Inc.
- San Miguel Equity Investments, Inc.
- SMC Asia Car Distributors Corporation (BMW Philippines)
- SMC Shipping & Lighterage Corporation
- SMC Stock Transfer Service Corporation
- SMITS, Inc.
- Southern Concrete Industries Corporation

== Legal issues ==
SMC shares are also involved in the controversial Coco Levy Case (Sandiganbayan Civil Case No. 33), which is actually subdivided into a total of eight cases involving different parties and properties. Arguably the most important case is Case No. 33-F, which involves 51% of the shares of SMC. This majority stake at SMC has been further subdivided into three separate litigations, each of which reaching the Supreme Court in highly contentious proceedings.

The first case involved 4% of SMC shares, which, in the case of San Miguel Corporation vs. Sandiganbayan, was awarded by the Supreme Court to the government. The second case, Republic of the Philippines vs. Sandiganbayan and Eduardo Cojuangco Jr., involved a 20% block that the Supreme Court, voting 7–4, awarded to Cojuangco. The most recent High Court pronouncement as of 2012, Philippine Coconut Producers Federation, Inc. (COCOFED) vs. Republic of the Philippines, where the Court, voting 11–0, declared that the remaining 27% of SMC is owned by the government. (Note: The 27% had been diluted to 24% due to the government's failure to subscribe to the increased authorized capital stock of SMC)

== Ownership ==
SMC is 20.51% publicly-owned with the following breakdown as of September 30, 2025:

Major shareholder	% of total*	Common shares	Preferred* shares
Top Frontier Investment Holdings	61.78%	1,472,668,340	—
(Ramon S. Ang-owned) Privado Holdings, Corp.	15.67%	373,623,796	—
PCD Nominee Corporation (Filipino)***	13.093738%	312,141,167	—
PCD Nominee Corporation (non−Filipino)***	4.200590%	100,137,725	—
Government of the Philippines** (see also Coco Levy Fund scam)	1.16%	27,636,339	—
Others^	4.097880%%	97,689,221	—
Total outstanding	100%	2,383,896,588	—

* In Gamboa v. Finance Secretary Teves (G.R. No. 176579 | June 28, 2011): The Supreme Court of the Philippines ruled that under Section 11, Article XII of the Constitution, “capital” in a public utility refers only to shares entitled to vote in the election of directors. Thus, preferred shares that have been vested with such power are included in the relevant computations, in addition to common shares that naturally are appurtenant with voting privileges in every aspect.
Currently, SMC has no true voting preferred shares (contrast with Globe Telecom#Ownership). To quote from its latest annual report, "The Series “2” preferred shares shall not be entitled to vote [on all matters requiring stockholders' approval], except in matters provided for in the Revised Corporation Code of the Philippines: amendment of articles of incorporation; adoption and amendment of by-laws; sale, lease exchange, mortgage, pledge, or other disposition of all or substantially all of the corporate property; incurring, creating or increasing bonded indebtedness; increase or decrease of capital stock; merger or consolidation with another corporation or other corporations; investment of corporate funds in another corporation or business; and dissolution."
** through the Department of Finance's Privatization Management Office (PMO)
*** While the Philippine Central Depository (PCD) is listed a major shareholder, it is more of a trustee-nominee for all shares lodged in the PCD system rather than a single owner/shareholder. Major beneficial shareholders (i.e. those who own at least 5% of outstanding capital stock with voting rights) hidden, if any, under the PCD system are checked/identified and are disclosed with the Definitive Information Statement companies are submitting annually to the local bourse and Securities and Exchange Commission
^ including direct, personal holdings of Ramon S. Ang & SM Investments-linked entity amounting to less than 1% of total outstanding shares

== Sports teams ==
=== Basketball ===
SMC has long been involved in commercial basketball in the Philippines beginning with the Manila Industrial and Commercial Athletic Association (MICAA) founded in 1938, where SMC organized its first basketball team, playing under the name San Miguel Brewery. After the company changed its name to San Miguel Corporation, the team's name was changed to San Miguel Corporation Braves (or the San Miguel Braves). SMC remained with the MICAA until the league's dissolution in 1982.

In 1975, SMC organized its second basketball team, when the company became a founding member of the Philippine Basketball Association, the first professional basketball league in Asia. The team is currently playing as the San Miguel Beermen and is currently the PBA franchise with the most championships (29).

SMC also owns two more PBA teams, Barangay Ginebra San Miguel and the Magnolia Hotshots, as a result of corporate acquisitions.

After the dissolution of the MICAA in 1983, the Philippine Amateur Basketball League, later renamed Philippine Basketball League, was formed in 1983 to take its place as the major amateur basketball league in the Philippines. SMC was one of the league's founding members and remained until the league became dormant in 2010. Its franchise, the Magnolia Purewater Wizards won a total of nine championships.

SMC also participated in the ASEAN Basketball League, playing as the San Miguel Beermen (ABL) from 2011 to 2013, winning one ABL championship.

On February 1, 2018, SMC became the name sponsor of Alab Pilipinas.

On February 1, 2018, moments after its partnership with ABL team Alab Pilipinas was formally announced, SMC forged another tie up but this time with Colegio de San Juan de Letran and vowed to support its sports program. In the summer of 2019 the Knights joined the PBA D-League as Petron-Letran to prepare for the upcoming NCAA Season 95 tournament and on November 19, 2019, they took home the school's 18th Men's Basketball championship by beating the defending champions San Beda Red Lions.

=== Volleyball ===
- Petron Blaze Spikers

=== Football ===
- Davao Aguilas F.C. (2017–2019; sponsor only)

== See also ==
- Grupo Mahou-San Miguel
