= Red Horse Beer =

Filipino lager beer

- Type: Extra-strong beer (Filipino lager)
- Manufacturer: San Miguel Brewery (a subsidiary of San Miguel Corporation)
- Origin: Philippines; International (export only)
- Introduced: May 1982
- Alcohol by volume: 6.9% 8% International (export only)
- Colour: Amber Lager
- Variants: 330ml bottle, 500ml bottle, 330ml can, 500ml can, 1 litre bottle, 13.2 keg
- Website: www.sanmiguelbrewery.com/red-horse-beer/

Red Horse Beer is an extra-strong lager brewed by San Miguel Brewery that originated in the Philippines.

== Overview ==
Red Horse is the first extra-strong beer brand in the Philippines. Formulated by German brewmaster Eric A. Wimmer at San Miguel's Mandaue plant in Cebu, the beer brand was developed under the code name "Project Delta" and first test marketed in the Ilocos and Davao regions in May 1982.

Red Horse is a high-alcohol lager of the San Miguel Brewery, with an alcohol content of 6.9% abv. It comes is various sizes, including the flagship 500 (500ml, regular), the discontinued Colt (250ml), the smaller Stallion (330ml), in Litro (1000ml), and in cans (330ml or 500ml).

There are bottles prior to 2000 that have the original logo of Red Horse Beer showing a horse with a smile. Another distinct mark of these old, rare bottles has the separate heels on the horseshoe, the word "Red Horse" in a stenciled font, and in the back information all printed in red instead of yellow. The information on the back may vary in very old, rare bottles with the previous packaging. These bottles are nicknamed "The Laughing/Happy Horse".

They exist, rarely on crates of the regular 500, Stallion and in some cases, in Litro. These "Laughing/Happy Horse" bottles exist because they recycle old bottles, with the previous packaging, which costs less than producing new bottles.

== Awards and prizes ==
| Year | Category | Awarding body |
|---|---|---|
| 2014 | Gold Medal | Australian International Beer Awards |
| 2015 | Trophy for Best International Lager | Australian International Beer Awards |
| 2016 | Silver Medal "Highly Recommended" 86 pts | Beverage Tastings Institute |
| 2018 | Gold Medal | Australian International Beer Awards |

== Red Horse Muziklaban ==
Red Horse Muziklaban is an annual rock band competition in the Philippines since 1999. It features young unsigned bands who compete for the grand prize of PHP 1,000,000 and a recording contract. It is sponsored by the San Miguel Brewery to promote its Red Horse Beer.

Muziklaban Winners
| Year | Winner | Finalists |
|---|---|---|
| 2000 | White Resemblance (Luzon Champion), Tears and Afterglow, Mindanao Champion Jack in the Box | |
| 2001 | Zoom Zoom Lunacy | |
| 2002 | 18th Issue | |
| 2003 | Fuseboxx | |
| 2004 | Mayonnaise | Eye-Me and the Royal Scavengers, Join the Club, Kinkyhooters, Namaskar, Playback, Rugis, Zoom Zoom Lunacy |
| 2005 | Sunflower Day Camp | Black Gulaman, Kabal, Eyescream, Mom's Cake, Monk's Hood, Piyesa, Sandata ni Lolo |
| 2006 | Hardboiledeggz (now Ibarra) | Black Heaven, Descant Gott, IMO, Kamia, Mad Clown, Pepe Pilar, Punchmint, Smoke Free, Treadstone |
| 2007 | Gayuma | Mental Floss, Dog Fight |
| 2008 | Even | Duelist, Indiephums, K9, Karding Sungkit, Moabites, Mortal Fear, Psykbox, Rigmarole, Triangulo |
| 2009 | Hatankaru | 2nd Squad, Cambronero, Hoodswhite, Kukumban, |
| 2010 | Light Of Luna | |
| 2011 | David Vs. Goliath | Leviticus, Mind of Clay, Zephaniah |
| 2012 | A Music Theory | Disengage, Fidortchi, Katulad, Memoronnie |
| 2013 | Manila Under Fire | Hubito's Tribe, Rigmarole, Stellarskin, We Band |
| 2014 | Nobela | Blood Over Matter, Ex-Manager BAND, I Killed a Cockroach Once(IKACO), Through The Waves - PH |
| 2015 | Insekto Pares | MAY, Odds and Evens, Orb of Blood, Stellarskin |
| 2016 | Shotgun Combo | Crickets Playground, Injent, Stutter, Thorre |
| 2017 | Woopis | Luminus, Redeemed by Blood, Sinaphatra, Talim |
| 2018 | Lilith (Lakas Category) | Ashes of Anubis, Chapters, Sucketseven, Cursed by Fire |
| | Happy Three Friends (Aklas Category) | Overture, Triangulo, Jack Sprat, Rockaholic |
| 2019 | We The Dying (Lakas Category) | MOAWH, Switchblade Manila, Pahina, Atthismo, MildSkill |
| | Pikaso and the Riots (Aklas Category) | ErrorCheck, Cross T26, Project Roots, Molay, Blancsugar |
| 2024 | Daks Not Dead (Lakas Category) | Nobody's Burden, Signals and Sirens, Luminus, Eidolon, Grab7 |
| | Interstate (Aklas Category) | Rosier, Alab, Summer Blossom, Ft. Pidiong, OIC |
| 2025 | Tamad Si Juan | VDS, Baguio GOLD Music (BGM), Hilo, Themata, and Tamad Si Juan |
