= Ramon Ang =

Filipino businessman

Ramon S. Ang LOH
- 蔡啟文
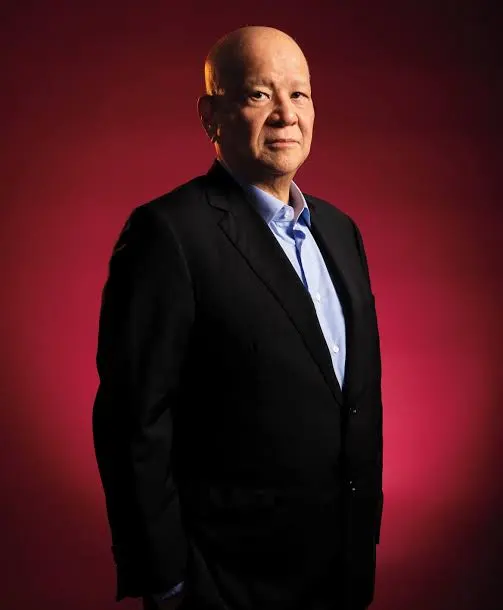

Chairman and Chief Executive Officer of San Miguel Corporation
- Incumbent
- Assumed office June 10, 2024
- Preceded by: Danding Cojuangco

President and Chief Executive Officer of Top Frontier Investment Holdings
- In office 2012

President and Chief Operating Officer of Philippine Airlines
- In office April 20, 2012 – October 15, 2014
- Preceded by: Jaime Bautista
- Succeeded by: Jaime Bautista

Personal details
- Born: January 14, 1954 (age 72) Manila, Philippines
- Citizenship: Philippines
- Spouse: Tessie Ang
- Children: 8
- Education: Far Eastern University (BS)
- Occupation: Businessman
- Profession: Businessman, mechanical engineer
- Known for: Chairman of Eagle Cement Corporation; President and Chief Executive Officer of Petron Corporation; Chairman of the Board of San Miguel Food and Beverage, Inc.; Chairman and Chief Executive Officer of SMC Global Power Holdings Corporation; Chairman of the Board of San Miguel Brewery Inc.; Member of the Board of Directors of Metro Pacific Investments Corporation; Chairman of the Board and President of San Miguel Aerocity Inc.; Chairman of the San Miguel Yamamura Packaging Corporation; Chairman of the San Miguel Properties, Inc.; Chairman of SMC Infrastructure; Chairman and Chief Executive Officer of the New NAIA Infrastructure Corporation; Chief Executive Officer of Metro Pacific Tollways Corporation (MPTC)

Chinese name
- Traditional Chinese: 蔡啟文
- Simplified Chinese: 蔡启文
Transcriptions
Standard Mandarin
- Hanyu Pinyin: Cài Qǐwén

Ramon See Ang (born January 14, 1954), also known by his initials RSA, is a Filipino businessman, mechanical engineer and former racing driver. He is the president and chief executive officer (CEO) of Top Frontier Investment Holdings, Inc., the largest shareholder of San Miguel Corporation (SMC). He is also the chairman and CEO of SMC, chairman of Cyber Bay Corporation and Eagle Cement Corporation and a member of the board of directors of Metro Pacific Investments. With a net worth of US$3.6 billion in 2026 according to Forbes magazine, Ang is the second-wealthiest person in the Philippines.

During the presidency of Joseph Estrada, Ang was considered the political broker between businessman Danding Cojuangco and Estrada.

== Early life and education ==
Ang is the son of ethnic Chinese parents.

Ang grew up in Tondo, Manila and worked in his father's automobile repair shop. He was a dealer of used Japanese car and truck engines. As working student, he holds a Bachelor of Science degree in mechanical engineering from Far Eastern University.

== Career ==
Ang served as managing director of the magwheel manufacturing company Commodore in the 1980s. He also participated in several autoslalom races he organized as company head, being proclaimed Slalom Champion of the Year in 1988 by the RACE Motorsports Club.

=== San Miguel Corporation ===
Ang met Danding Cojuangco, the chairman of San Miguel Corporation, in a car repair shop. Cojuangco, a car collector, was looking for a mechanic to repair a broken multimillion-peso sports car that he owned, and he grew angry as the mechanics in the shop weren't able to identify the sports car's defect. Ang approached an angry Cojuangco to tell him what his car defect was. Cojuangco then hired Ang on the spot as his official mechanic. When Cojuangco went on exile with newly ousted dictator Ferdinand Marcos (Cojuangco was a well known Marcos crony involved with the Coco Levy Fund scam), Ang took care of Cojuangco's cars, house, and investments. When Cojuangco returned to the Philippines, Ang handed back everything Cojuangco entrusted him to.

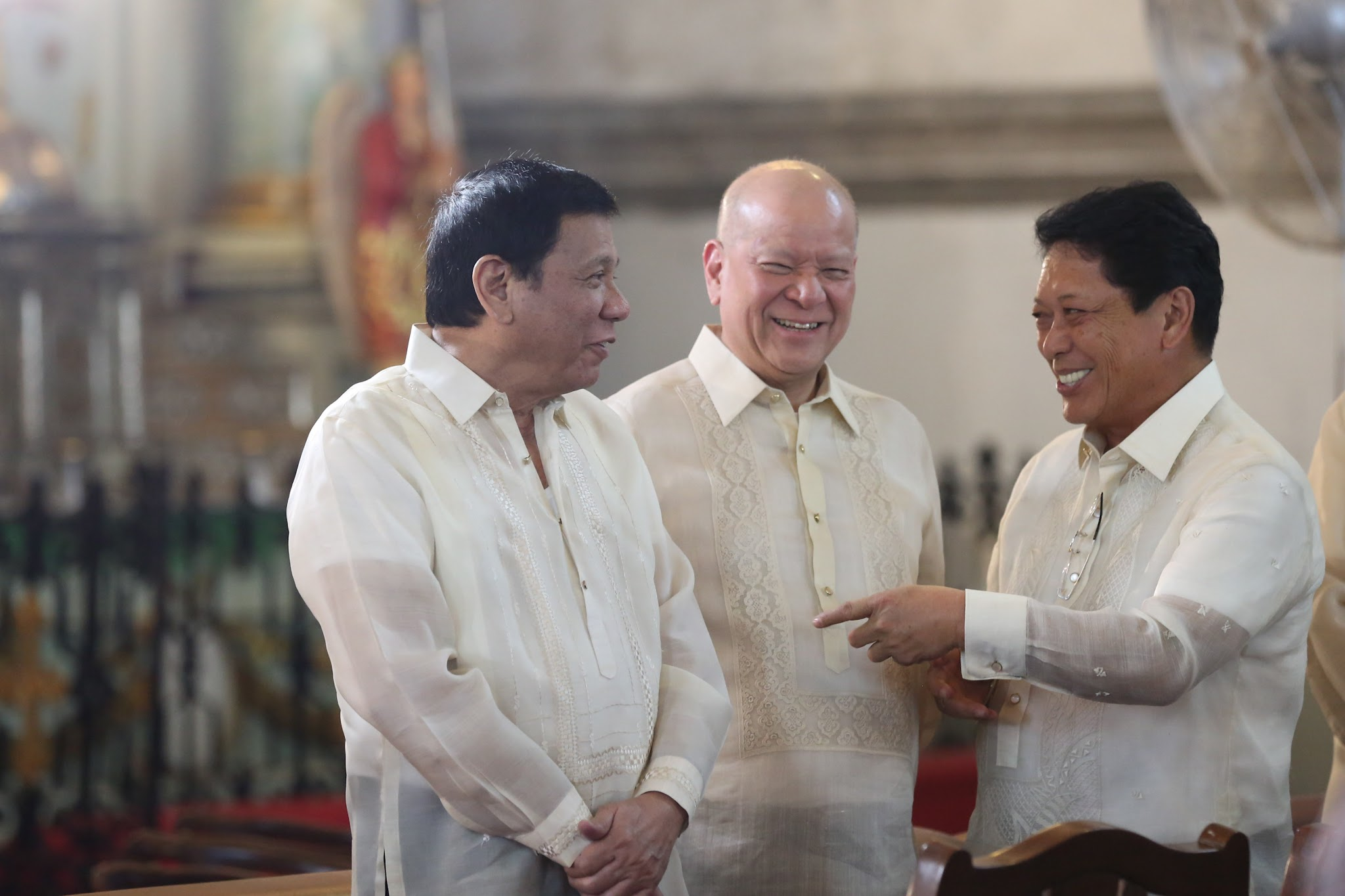
Ramon Ang (center) with President Rodrigo Duterte (left) and Labor Secretary Silvestre Bello III in 2016

Ang was elected vice-chairman of SMC in January 1999; and later as president and chief operating officer (COO) in March 2002. Simultaneous to his position at SMC, Ang also owned the real estate firm Centech, which was alleged to have been involved in business deals with the Estrada family during the presidency of Joseph Estrada. In June 2012, he gained control of SMC after acquiring the shares owned by Cojuangco.

On April 15, 2021, ten months following the death of Cojuangco, SMC amended its by-laws to unify the role, functions and duties of chief executive officer (CEO) to that of the president.

On June 10, 2024, Ang became chairman and CEO; and his eldest son, John Paul L. Ang, assumed the positions of vice-chairman, president and COO. SMC shall amend its by-laws to redefine the roles, functions and duties of the chairman and chief executive officer, and the president and chief operating officer, subject to stockholders and SEC approvals.

== Personal life ==
Ang was married to Tessie. They have eight children, including: Cecile, Monica, José Maria "Jomar", Jacqueline, Carmela, John Paul, and Jacob. John Paul is president of Eagle Cement Corporation and San Miguel Corporation's vice chair, president and COO. Monica is a finance officer. Cecile is manager of the family-owned Diamond Hotel Manila Bay. On Holy Saturday, April 11, 2020, Jomar (b. 1993), Ang's third child died after a serious injury.
