= PSE All Shares Index =

Stock index in the Philippine Stock Exchange

- Operator: Philippine Stock Exchange
- Exchanges: Philippine Stock Exchange
- Related indices: PSE Composite Index
- Bloomberg: PASHR:IND

The PSE All Shares Index is the stock index in the Philippine Stock Exchange (PSE) in which all of the stocks traded are included in computations of the level of the index. It should not be confused with the PSE Composite Index which is a weighted index of 30 of the top companies on the PSE.

== List of stocks ==
=== 0-9 ===
- 2GO Group (PSE: 2GO)

=== A ===
- A. Brown Company (PSE: BRN)
- A. Soriano Corporation (PSE: ANS)
- Abacus Consolidated Resources & Holdings (PSE: ABA and ABAB)
- Aboitiz Equity Ventures (PSE: AEV)
- Aboitiz Power Corporation (PSE: AP)
- Abra Mining & Industrial Corporation (PSE: AR)
- ABS-CBN Corporation (PSE: ABS)
- ACEN Corporation (PSE: ACEN)
- Alcorn Gold Resources Corporation (PSE: APM)
- Allhome Corp. (PSE: HOME)
- Alliance Global Group (PSE: AGI)
- Alliance Tuna International (PSE: FOOD)
- Alsons Consolidated Resources (PSE: ACR)
- Anchor Land Holdings (PSE: ALHI)
- Anglo Philippine Holdings Corporation (PSE: APO)
- APC Group (PSE: APC)
- Apex Mining Company (PSE: APX and APXB)
- Araneta Properties (PSE: ARA)
- AREIT, Inc. (PSE: AREIT)
- Asia Amalgamated Holdings (PSE: AAA)
- Asia United Bank (PSE: AUB)
- Asian Terminals (PSE: ATI)
- Atlas Consolidated Mining & Development Corporation (PSE: AT)
- ATN Holdings (PSE: ATN and ATNB)
- Atok-Big Wedge Company (PSE: AB and ABB)
- Ayala Corporation (PSE: AC)
- Ayala Land (PSE: ALI)
- Axelum Resources Corp. (PSE: AXLM)

=== B ===
- Banco de Oro Unibank, Inc. (PSE: BDO)
- Bank of the Philippine Islands (PSE: BPI)
- Basic Energy Corporation (PSE: BSC)
- Belle Corporation (PSE: BEL)
- Benguet Corporation (PSE: BC and BCB)
- BHI Holdings (PSE: BH)
- Bloomberry (PSE: BLOOM)
- Bogo Medellin Milling Company (PSE: BMM)
- Boulevard Holdings (PSE: BHI)

=== C ===
- CADP Group Corporation (PSE: CAC)
- Cebu Landmasters
- Cebu Pacific (PSE: CEB)
- Cebu Holdings (PSE: CHI)
- Cebu Property Venture & Development (PSE: CPV and CPVB)
- Central Azucarera De Tarlac (PSE: CAT)
- Cemex
- Centro Escolar University (PSE: CEU)
- Century Pacific Food (PSE: CNPF)
- Century Properties (PSE: CPG)
- Chemical Industries of the Philippines (PSE: CIP)
- Chemrez Technologies (PSE: COAT)
- China Banking Corporation (PSE: CHIB)
- Chinatrust (Philippines) Commercial Bank Corporation (PSE: CHTR)
- Citiseconline.Com (PSE: COL)
- City & Land Developers (PSE: LAND)
- City Resources (Philippines) Corporation (PSE: CRC)
- Cityland Development Corporation (PSE: CDC)
- Citystate Savings Bank (PSE: CSB)
- Concepcion Industries (PSE: CIC)
- Concrete Aggregates Corporation (PSE: CA and CAB)
- Converge ICT
- Cosco Capital
- Crown Equities (PSE: CEI)
- Cyber Bay Corporation (PSE: CYBR)

=== D ===
- D&L Industries, Inc. (PSE: DNL)
- Del Monte Pacific (PSE: DELM)
- DigiPlus
- Dito CME Holdings Corporation (PSE: DITO)
- DFNN Inc. (PSE: DFNN)
- Dizon Copper Silver Mines (PSE: DIZ)
- DMCI Holdings (PSE: DMC)
- DM Wenceslao & Associates, Incorporated (PSE: DMW)
- DoubleDragon Corporation

=== E ===
- East Asia Power Resources Corporation (PSE: PWR)
- EastWest Bank
- Easycall Communications Phils. (PSE: ECP)
- EEI Corporation (PSE: EEI)
- EIB Realty Development (PSE: EIBR)
- Empire East Land Holdings (PSE: ELI)
- Energy Development Corporation
- Eton Properties Philippines (PSE: ETON)
- Euro-Med Laboratories Phils. (PSE: EURO)
- Ever Gotesco Resources & Holdings (PSE: EVER)
- Export and Industry Bank (PSE: EIB)

=== F ===
- F & J Prince Holdings Corporation (PSE: FJP and FJPB)
- Far Eastern University (PSE: FEU)
- Federal Resources Investment Group (PSE: FED)
- Figaro Coffee (PSE: FCG)
- Fil-Estate Corporation (PSE: FC)
- Fil-Estate Land (PSE: LND)
- Filinvest Development Corporation (PSE: FDC)
- Filinvest Land (PSE: FLI)
- Filipino Fund (PSE: FFI)
- Filsyn Corporation (PSE: FYN and FYNB)
- First Abacus Financial Holdings Corp. (PSE: FAF)
- First Gen Corporation (PSE: FGEN)
- First Metro Investment Corporation (PSE: FMIC)
- First Philippine Holdings Corporation (PSE: FPH)
- Forum Pacific (PSE: FPI)
- Fruitas Holdings, Inc. (PSE: FRUIT)

=== G ===
- Geograce Resources Philippines (PSE: GEO)
- Ginebra San Miguel (PSE: GSMI)
- Globalport 900, Inc. (PSE: PORT)
- Globe Telecom (PSE: GLO)
- GMA Network (PSE: GMA7)
- Grand Plaza Hotel Corporation (PSE: GPH)
- GT Capital

=== H ===
- Holcim Philippines (PSE: HLCM)
- House of Investments (PSE: HI)

=== I ===
- Imperial Resources (PSE: IMP and IMPB)
- International Container Terminal Services Inc. (PSE: ICT)
- Interport Resources Corporation (PSE: IRC and IRCB)
- Ionics (PSE: ION)
- iPeople (PSE: IPO)
- IP E-Games
- IPM Holdings Inc. (PSE: IPM)
- I-Remit (PSE: I)
- Island Information and Technology (PSE: IS)
- Ism Communications Corporation (PSE: ISM)
- Italpinas
- Ivantage Corporation (PSE: V)

=== J ===
- JG Summit Holdings (PSE: JGS)
- Jollibee Foods Corporation (PSE: JFC)
- Jolliville Holdings Corporation (PSE: JOH)
- Jth Davies Holdings (PSE: JTH)

=== K ===
- The Keepers Holdings Inc. (PSE: KEEPR)
- Keppel Philippine Holdings (PSE: KPH and KPHB)
- Keppel Philippines Properties (PSE: KEP)
- Kepwealth Property Phils. Inc (PSE: KPPI)

=== L ===
- LBC Express (PSE: LBC)
- Leisure & Resorts World Corporation (PSE: LR)
- Lepanto Consolidated Mining Company (PSE: LC and LCB)
- Liberty Flour Mills (PSE: LFM)
- Liberty Telecoms Holdings (PSE: LIB)
- LMG Chemicals Corporation (PSE: LMG)
- Lodestar Investment Holdings Corporation (PSE: LIHC)
- Lopez Holdings Corporation
- Lorenzo Shipping Corporation (PSE: LSC)
- LT Group

=== M ===
- Mabuhay Holdings Corporation (PSE: MHC)
- Mabuhay Vinyl Corporation (PSE: MVC)
- Macay Holdings
- Macondray Plastics (PSE: MRAY)
- MacroAsia Corporation (PSE: MAC)
- Manila Broadcasting Company (PSE: MBC)
- Manila Bulletin Publishing Corporation (PSE: MB)
- Manila Electric Company (PSE: MER)
- Manila Jockey Club (PSE: MJC)
- Manila Mining Corporation (PSE: MA and MAB)
- Manila Water (PSE: MWC)
- Manulife Philippines Financial Corporation (PSE: MFC)
- Marsteel Consolidated (PSE: MC and MCB)
- Max's Group (PSE: MAXS)
- Medco Holdings (PSE: MED)
- Megawide
- Megaworld Corporation (PSE: MEG)
- MerryMart Consumer Corp. (PSE: MM )
- Metro Alliance Holdings & Equities Corp. (PSE: MAH and MAHB)
- Metro Pacific Investments Corporation (PSE: MPI)
- Metropolitan Bank & Trust Company (PSE: MBT)
- Millennium Global Holdings, Inc. (PSE: MG)
- Monde Nissin Corporation (PSE: MONDE)
- Mondragon International Philippines (PSE: MON)
- MRC Allied Industries (PSE: MRC)
- Music Semiconductors Corporation (PSE: MUSX)

=== N ===
- National Reinsurance Corporation of the Philippines (PSE: NRCP)
- Nextstage (PSE: NXT)
- Nickel Asia Corporation
- Nihao Mineral Resources International (PSE: NI)
- Now Corporation

=== O ===
- Omico Corporation (PSE: OM)
- Oriental Petroleum & Mineral Corporation (PSE: OPM and OPMB)

=== P ===
- Pacific Online Systems Corporation (PSE: LOTO)
- Pacifica, Inc. (PSE: PA and PAB)
- Panasonic Manufacturing Philippines Corporation (PSE: PMPC)
- Paxys (PSE: PAX)
- PCI Leasing and Finance (PSE: PCIL)
- Petroenergy Resources Corporation (PSE: PERC)
- Petron Corporation (PSE: PCOR)
- Philex Mining Corporation (PSE: PX)
- Philippine Airlines (PSE: PAL)
- Philippine Bank of Communications (PSE: PBC)
- Philippine Business Bank
- Philippine Communications Satellite Corporation (PSE: PHC)
- Philippine Dealing Exchange
- Philippine Estates Corporation (PSE: PHES)
- Philippine Long Distance Telephone Company (PSE: TEL)
- Philippine National Bank (PSE: PNB)
- Philippine National Construction Corporation (PSE: PNC)
- Philippine Racing Club (PSE: PRC)
- Philippine Realty and Holdings Corporation (PSE: RLT)
- Philippine Savings Bank (PSE: PSB)
- Philippine Seven Corporation (PSE: SEVN)
- Philippine Stock Exchange (PSE: PSE)
- Philippine Telegraph and Telephone Corporation (PSE: PTT)
- Philippine Tobacco Flue-Curing and Redrying Corp. (PSE: TFC)
- Philippine Trust Company (PSE: PTC)
- Philodrill
- PhilWeb Corporation (PSE: WEB)
- Phoenix Petroleum Philippines, Inc. (PSE: PNX)
- Picop Resources (PSE: PCP)
- Pilipino Telephone Corporation (PSE: PLTL)
- PNOC Energy Development Corporation (PSE: EDC)
- PNOC Exploration Corporation (PSE: PEC and PECB)
- Polar Property Holdings Corporation (PSE: PO)
- Premiere Entertainment Productions (PSE: PEP)
- Prime Gaming Philippines (PSE: PGPI)
- Prime Media Holdings (PSE: PRIM)
- Prime Orion Philippines (PSE: POPI)
- Primetown Property Group (PSE: PMT)
- Primex Corporation (PSE: PRMX)
- Pryce Corporation (PSE: PPC)
- Puregold

=== R ===
- Republic Cement Corporation (PSE: RCM)
- Republic Glass Holdings Corporation (PSE: REG)
- RFM Corporation (PSE: RFM)
- Rizal Commercial Banking Corporation (PSE: RCB)
- Robinsons Land Corporation (PSE: RLC)
- Robinsons Retail
- Roxas Holdings (PSE: ROX)

=== S ===
- San Miguel Corporation (PSE: SMC and SMCB)
- San Miguel Properties (PSE: SMP)
- San Miguel Food and Beverage (PSE: PF and PFB)
- Sanitary Wares Manufacturing Corporation (PSE: SWM)
- Seafront Resources Corporation (PSE: SPM)
- Security Bank Corporation (PSE: SECB)
- Semirara Mining Corporation (PSE: SCC)
- Shang Properties (PSE: SHNG)
- Shakey's Asia Ventures Inc. (PSE: PIZZA)
- Sinophil Corporation (PSE: SINO)
- SM Development Corporation (PSE: SMDC)
- SM Investments Corporation (PSE: SM)
- SM Prime Holdings (PSE: SMPH)
- Solid Group (PSE: SGI)
- South China Resources (PSE: SOC)
- Southeast Asia Cement Holdings (PSE: CMT)
- SPC Power Corporation (PSE: SPC)
- Sta. Lucia Land (PSE: SLI)
- Starmalls
- STI Education Systems Holdings (PSE: STI)
- Steniel Manufacturing Corporation (PSE: STN)
- Sun Life Financial Inc. (PSE: SLF)
- Suntrust Home Developers (PSE: SUN)
- Supercity Realty Development Corporation (PSE: SRDC)
- Swift Foods (PSE: SFI)
- Synergy Grid and Development Philippines Inc. (PSE: SGP)

=== T ===
- Tanduay Holdings (PSE: TDY)
- The Philodrill Corporation (PSE: OV)
- Top Frontier Investment Holdings
- Trans-Asia Oil And Energy Development Corp. (PSE: TA)
- Transpacific Broadband Group International (PSE: TBGI)

=== U ===
- Unioil Resources & Holdings Company (PSE: UNI)
- Union Bank of the Philippines (PSE: UBP)
- United Paragon Mining Corporation (PSE: UPM)
- Universal Rightfield Property Holdings (PSE: UP)
- Universal Robina Corporation (PSE: URC)
- Uniwide Holdings (PSE: UW)

=== V ===
- Victorias Milling Company (PSE: VMC)
- Vista Land and Lifescapes, Inc. (PSE: VLL)
- Vitarich Corporation (PSE: VITA)
- Vivant Corporation (PSE: VVT)
- Vulcan Industrial & Mining (PSE: VUL)

=== W ===
- Waterfront Philippines (PSE: WPI)
- Wellex Industries (PSE: WIN)
- Wilcon Depot (PSE: WLCON)

=== Z ===
- Zeus Holdings (PSE: ZHI)

== Former Members ==
- 8990 Holdings, Inc. (PSE: 8990P) (PSE: HOUSE)
- Aboitiz Transport System Corporation (PSE: ATS)
- Acesite (Philippines) Hotel Corporation (PSE: DHC)
- Active Alliance (PSE: AAI)
- AGP Industrial Corporation (PSE: AGP and AGPB)
- Alaska Milk Corporation (AMC)
- Ajo.Net Holdings (PSE: AJO)
- Aries Prime Resources (PSE: APR)
- Asiatrust Development Bank (PSE: ASIA)
- ATR Kimeng Financial Corporation (PSE: ATRK)
- Bacnotan Consolidated Industrial (PSE: BCI)
- Banco Filipino Savings and Mortgage Bank (PSE: BF)
- Bankard (PSE: BKD)
- Benpres Holdings (PSE: BPC)
- Cosmos Bottling Corporation (CBC)
- Gotesco Land (GO)
- Highlands Prime (HP)
- Interphil Laboratories (ILIB)
- Keppel Philippines Marine (KPM)
- Splash Corporation (SPH)
- Wise Holdings (WHI/WHIB)
- Wyeth Philippines, Inc. (WYE)
