= PSE Composite Index =

Benchmark stock index of the Philippine Stock Exchange

- Operator: Philippine Stock Exchange
- Exchanges: Philippine Stock Exchange
- Trading symbol: PSEi
- Constituents: 30
- Type: Large cap
- Weighting method: Free-float capitalization-weighted
- Related indices: PSE All Shares Index PSE Mid-cap Index PSE DivY Index
- Reuters: PSI
- Bloomberg: PCOMP:IND

The PSE Composite Index, or the PSEi (since April 3, 2006, previously as PHISIX), is the Philippine main stock market index, consisting of 30 of the largest companies traded in the Philippine Stock Exchange (PSE). This is in contrast to the broader PSE All Shares Index which is an index of all stocks traded in the PSE.

The base level of the PSEi was pegged at 1,022.045 points, according to the close of the index on February 28, 1990. The highest closing value was 9,058.62 on Monday, January 29, 2018. The highest intraday value was recorded at that same day at 9,078.37.

It is the PSE's primary benchmark equity index and is seen as an indicator of the general state of the Philippine business climate, although there is evidence the index may not be a reliable indicator of the state of the broader Philippine economy.

== Methodology ==
=== Composition ===
The PSE revises the list of component stocks at least twice a year with regular rebalancing schedules every February and August, based on December-end and June-end information spanning latest 12 months of trading data, respectively. Component stocks should broadly satisfy the following requirements in order to qualify for the index:

- Listed in the main board of the PSE for at least 12 months during the review period
- Public float: At least 20% by the end of the review period, as indicated in the quarterly Public Ownership Report
- Market liquidity: Company must rank among the top 25% in terms of median daily trade per month in at least 9 out of the 12 months within the review period
- Market capitalization: Should be among the 30 largest companies based on full market capitalization, after passing the public float and liquidity eligibility requirements.

==== 2026 amendments to index qualifications ====
On July 21, 2026, the PSE introduced modifications to the PSEi inclusion criteria in addition to the above qualifications and scheduled to take effect starting from the regular rebalancing in February 2027. According to the PSE, the changes are meant to align its market indices with global counterparts.

- An additional market capitalization filter is set to be implemented such that only stocks within the top 98% in full market capitalization in the Philippine Stock Exchange shall be considered for inclusion in the PSEi (and likewise the PSE MidCap and PSE DivY indices).
- Assessing market liquidity will be replaced with the monthly average daily value (MADV) turnover and median trading activity ratio (MTAR) metrics.

Philippine Stock Exchange Indices Liquidity Metrics
Liquidity Metric	Minimum Threshold	Definition
Monthly Average Daily Value (MADV) Turnover	Within top 25% in MADV for 9 out of 12 months during the review period	Total value traded during the month by the number of trading days in the month.
Median Trading Activity Ratio (MTAR)	15%	Cumulative sum of the 12 monthly trading activity ratios within the review period. Monthly trading activity ratio is derived by multiplying the median daily value traded by the number of traded days within the month, then divided against the company's free-float market capitalization as of the end of that month.

- The minimum public float requirement has been lowered to 15% for companies with total market capitalization of at least PHP 250 Billion, provided that the revised market capitalization and market liquidity requirements are met. These criteria are seen to allow for inclusion of mega-cap issuances into the equity index.

However, the PSE maintained the semi-annual review frequency and coverage to its indices despite significant changes in the index inclusion criteria.

=== Calculation ===
The index uses a free-float adjusted market capitalization method (since 2006) and follows the formula below used by the PSE to calculate the index's value:

$\mathsf{PSE\ Index_t={\textstyle \sum_{i=1}^n(P_i\times S_i\times F_i) \displaystyle\over\ b}\times PSE\ Index_{t-1}}$

Where:

n = Total number of component companies (30)

$\mathsf{P_i}$ = Closing price of company i at day t

$\mathsf{S_i}$= Available shares of company i at day t

$\mathsf{F_i}$= Company free float level (0 to 1), where 1 means 100% free float.

b = Free float-adjusted market capitalization base

=== Frequency ===
The index is calculated every 15 seconds and currently disseminated every minute whenever the Philippine Stock Exchange is open.

== Current components ==
PSEi Index Component Stocks
Company	Ticker symbol	Also a component of the
Aboitiz Equity Ventures	PSE: AEV	PSE Holding Firms Index
ACEN Corporation	PSE: ACEN	PSE Industrial Index
AREIT, Inc.	PSE: AREIT	PSE Property Index
Ayala Corporation	PSE: AC	PSE Holding Firms Index
Ayala Land	PSE: ALI	PSE Property Index
Banco de Oro	PSE: BDO	PSE Financials Index
Bank of the Philippine Islands	PSE: BPI	PSE Financials Index
Chinabank	PSE: CBC	PSE Financials Index
Century Pacific Food	PSE: CNPF	PSE Industrial Index
DigiPlus Interactive	PSE: PLUS	PSE Services Index
DMCI Holdings	PSE: DMC	PSE Holding Firms Index
Emperador, Inc.	PSE: EMI	PSE Industrial Index
Globe Telecom	PSE: GLO	PSE Services Index
GT Capital	PSE: GTCAP	PSE Holding Firms Index
International Container Terminal Services	PSE: ICT	PSE Services Index
JG Summit Holdings	PSE: JGS	PSE Holding Firms Index
Jollibee Foods Corporation	PSE: JFC	PSE Industrial Index
LT Group	PSE: LTG	PSE Holding Firms Index
Maynilad	PSE: MYNLD	PSE Industrial Index
Meralco	PSE: MER	PSE Industrial Index
Metrobank	PSE: MBT	PSE Financials Index
Monde Nissin	PSE: MONDE	PSE Industrial Index
PLDT	PSE: TEL	PSE Services Index
Puregold	PSE: PGOLD	PSE Services Index
RL Commercial REIT	PSE: RCR	PSE Property Index
San Miguel Corporation	PSE: SMC	PSE Holding Firms Index
Semirara Mining and Power Corporation	PSE: SCC	PSE Mining and Oil Index
SM Investments	PSE: SM	PSE Holding Firms Index
SM Prime Holdings	PSE: SMPH	PSE Property Index
Universal Robina	PSE: URC	PSE Industrial Index

== Record values ==
Category	All-Time Highs	
Closing	9,058.62	Monday, 29 January 2018
Intraday	9,078.37	Monday, 29 January 2018

== Annual returns ==
The following table shows the closing value of the PSEi at the end of each calendar year since 1980.

Year	Closing level	Points Change	% Annual Change
1980	256.78		
1981	183.91	−72.87	−28.38%
1982	170.36	−13.55	−7.37%
1983	167.49	−2.87	−1.68%
1984	100.29	−67.20	−40.12%
1985	131.19	+30.90	+30.81%
1986	424.81	+293.62	+223.81%
1987	813.17	+388.36	+91.42%
1988	841.65	+28.48	+3.50%
1989	1,104.57	+262.92	+31.24%
1990	651.78	−452.79	−40.99%
1991	1,151.87	+500.09	+76.73%
1992	1,256.22	+104.35	+9.06%
1993	3,196.08	+1,939.86	+154.42%
1994	2,785.81	−410.27	−12.84%
1995	2,594.18	−191.63	−6.88%
1996	3,170.56	+576.38	+22.22%
1997	1,869.23	−1,301.33	−41.04%
1998	1,968.78	+99.55	+5.33%
1999	2,142.97	+174.19	+8.85%
2000	1,494.50	−648.47	−30.26%
2001	1,168.08	−326.42	−21.84%
2002	1,018.41	−149.67	−12.81%
2003	1,442.37	+423.96	+41.63%
2004	1,822.83	+380.46	+26.38%
2005	2,096.04	+273.21	+14.99%
2006	2,982.54	+886.50	+42.29%
2007	3,621.60	+639.06	+21.43%
2008	1,872.85	−1,748.75	−48.29%
2009	3,052.68	+1,179.83	+63.00%
2010	4,201.14	+1,148.46	+37.62%
2011	4,371.96	+170.82	+4.07%
2012	5,812.73	+1,440.77	+32.95%
2013	5,889.83	+77.10	+1.33%
2014	7,230.57	+1,340.74	+22.76%
2015	6,952.08	−278.49	−3.85%
2016	6,840.64	−111.44	−1.60%
2017	8,558.42	+1,717.78	+25.11%
2018	7,466.02	−1,092.40	−12.76%
2019	7,815.26	+349.24	+4.68%
2020	7,139.71	−675.55	−8.64%
2021	7,122.63	−17.08	−0.24%
2022	6,566.39	−556.24	−7.81%
2023	6,450.04	−116.35	−1.77%
2024	6,528.79	+78.75	+1.22%
2025	6,052.92	−475.87	−7.29%

== Component changes ==
Date	Added		Removed		Reason
Date	Ticker	Security	Ticker	Security	Reason
August 3, 2026	MYNLD	Maynilad	CNVRG	Converge ICT	Regular semi-annual rebalancing. Maynilad entered the index via early entry.
February 2, 2026	RCR	RL Commercial REIT	AGI	Alliance Global	Regular semi-annual rebalancing.
August 18, 2025	PLUS	DigiPlus Interactive	BLOOM	Bloomberry Resorts	Regular semi-annual rebalancing.
February 3, 2025	AREIT	Ayala REIT	NIKL	Nickel Asia	Regular semi-annual rebalancing.
February 3, 2025	CBC	Chinabank	WLCON	Wilcon Depot	Regular semi-annual rebalancing.
October 4, 2023	NIKL	Nickel Asia	UBP	Unionbank	The PSE re-classified shares held by the Social Security System in Unionbank as outside of the public float. This lowered the company's free-float level, rendering it ineligible for index inclusion.
September 26, 2023	BLOOM	Bloomberry Resorts	AP	Aboitiz Power	Aboitiz Power's buyback dragged its free-float level below the minimum requirement, rendering it ineligible for index inclusion.
September 26, 2023	CNPF	Century Pacific Food	MPI	Metro Pacific Investments	Metro Pacific Investments was taken private.
February 6, 2023	DMC	DMCI Holdings	MEG	Megaworld	Regular semi-annual rebalancing.
February 6, 2023	UBP	Unionbank	RLC	Robinsons Land	Regular semi-annual rebalancing.
August 8, 2022	SCC	Semirara Mining and Power Corporation	SECB	Security Bank	Regular semi-annual rebalancing.
February 14, 2022	EMP	Emperador, Inc.	BLOOM	Bloomberry Resorts	Regular semi-annual rebalancing.
February 14, 2022	MONDE	Monde Nissin	RRHI	Robinsons Retail	Regular semi-annual rebalancing. Monde Nissin entered the index via early entry.
October 11, 2021	WLCON	Wilcon Depot	FGEN	First Gen Corporation	KKR acquired stake of First Gen's shares, bringing the latter's free float level below the minimum requirement.
August 16, 2021	ACEN	ACEN Corporation	DMC	DMCI Holdings	Regular semi-annual rebalancing.
August 16, 2021	CNVRG	Converge ICT	EMP	Emperador, Inc.	Regular semi-annual rebalancing. PSE revised its index guidelines to allow for early entry, rendering the newly-listed Converge eligible for the index.
August 17, 2020	EMP	Emperador, Inc.	SCC	Semirara Mining and Power Corporation	Regular semi-annual rebalancing.
February 18, 2019	BLOOM	Bloomberry Resorts	PCOR	Petron Corporation	Regular semi-annual rebalancing.
September 28, 2017	RRHI	Robinsons Retail	EDC	Energy Development Corporation	Component stock First Gen Incorporated (FGEN) sold its stake in EDC to Macquarie, bringing EDC's free float level below the minimum requirement.
March 13, 2017	PGOLD	Puregold	EMP	Emperador, Inc.	Regular semi-annual rebalancing.
September 12, 2016	SECB	Security Bank	BLOOM	Bloomberry Resorts	Regular semi-annual rebalancing.
September 15, 2015	EMP	Emperador, Inc.	PX	Philex Mining	Regular semi-annual rebalancing.
March 17, 2014	MER	Meralco	MWC	Manila Water	Regular semi-annual rebalancing.
September 16, 2013	GTCAP	GT Capital	BEL	Belle Corporation	Regular semi-annual rebalancing.
September 16, 2013	LTG	LT Group	MER	Meralco	Regular semi-annual rebalancing.
March 11, 2013	BLOOM	Bloomberry Resorts	SMDC	SM Development Corp.	Regular semi-annual rebalancing.
September 10, 2012	PCOR	Petron Corporation	CEB	Cebu Pacific	Regular semi-annual rebalancing.
September 12, 2011	BEL	Belle Corporation	ABS	ABS-CBN Corporation	Regular semi-annual rebalancing.
September 12, 2011	CEB	Cebu Pacific	FLI	Filinvest Land	Regular semi-annual rebalancing.
September 12, 2011	SMC	San Miguel Corporation	FPH	First Philippine Holdings Corporation	Regular semi-annual rebalancing.
September 12, 2011	SMDC	SM Development Corp.	LC	Lepanto Consolidated Mining Co.	Regular semi-annual rebalancing.
September 12, 2011	SCC	Semirara Mining Corporation	SECB	Security Bank	Regular semi-annual rebalancing.
May 9, 2011	SECB	Security Bank	CHIB	Chinabank	Regular semi-annual rebalancing.
November 8, 2010	DMC	DMCI Holdings	GMA7	GMA Network	Regular semi-annual rebalancing.
November 8, 2010	FGEN	First Gen Corporation	SMC	San Miguel Corporation	Regular semi-annual rebalancing.
November 8, 2010	JGS	JG Summit Holdings	SECB	Security Bank	Regular semi-annual rebalancing.
May 11, 2010	ABS	ABS-CBN Corporation	DMC	DMCI Holdings	Regular semi-annual rebalancing.
May 11, 2010	CHIB	Chinabank	FGEN	First Gen Corporation	Regular semi-annual rebalancing.
May 11, 2010	MPI	Metro Pacific Investments	PSE	Philippine Stock Exchange	Regular semi-annual rebalancing.
November 3, 2009	DMC	DMCI Holdings	ABS	ABS-CBN Corporation	Regular semi-annual rebalancing.
November 3, 2009	PSE	Philippine Stock Exchange	RCBC	Rizal Commercial Banking Corporation	Regular semi-annual rebalancing.
November 3, 2009	SECB	Security Bank	VLL	Vista Land	Regular semi-annual rebalancing.
May 4, 2009	APC	Aboitiz Power	PCOR	Petron Corporation	Regular semi-annual rebalancing.
May 4, 2009	GMA7	GMA Network	UBP	Unionbank	Regular semi-annual rebalancing.
November 14, 2008	ABS	ABS-CBN Corporation	JGS	JG Summit Holdings	Regular semi-annual rebalancing.
November 14, 2008	AGI	Alliance Global	PNB	Philippine National Bank	Regular semi-annual rebalancing.
November 14, 2008	PCOR	Petron Corporation	HLCM	Holcim Philippines	Regular semi-annual rebalancing.
May 26, 2008	PNB	Philippine National Bank	ABS	ABS-CBN Corporation	Regular semi-annual rebalancing.
May 26, 2008	RCBC	Rizal Commercial Banking Corporation	BEL	Belle Corporation	Regular semi-annual rebalancing.
May 26, 2008	UBP	Unionbank	DMC	DMCI Holdings	Regular semi-annual rebalancing.
May 26, 2008	VLL	Vista Land	PCOR	Petron Corporation	Regular semi-annual rebalancing.
November 16, 2007	EDC	PNOC Energy Development Corporation	MA	Manila Mining	Regular semi-annual rebalancing.
November 16, 2007	FLI	Filinvest Land	SECB	Security Bank	Regular semi-annual rebalancing.
November 16, 2007	RLC	Robinsons Land			Regular semi-annual rebalancing.
June 4, 2007			EPCI	Equitable Bank	Removed from the index without replacement due to its merger with another constituent stock Banco De Oro.
May 16, 2007	FGEN	First Gen Corporation	BPC	Benpres Holdings	Regular semi-annual rebalancing.
May 16, 2007	MA	Manila Mining	FLI	Filinvest Land	Regular semi-annual rebalancing.
May 16, 2007	URC	Universal Robina	SCC	Semirara Mining	Regular semi-annual rebalancing.
December 4, 2006	HLCM	Holcim Philippines	DGTL	Digitel	Regular semi-annual rebalancing.
December 4, 2006	JGS	JG Summit Holdings	EEI	Empire East Land	Regular semi-annual rebalancing.
December 4, 2006	SECB	Security Bank	MA	Manila Mining	Regular semi-annual rebalancing.
December 4, 2006	SCC	Semirara Mining	MPC	Metro Pacific Corporation	Regular semi-annual rebalancing.
April 3, 2006	EEI	Empire East Land	HLCM	Holcim Philippines	PSE adopted a free-float criterion, which Holcim failed to qualify.
April 3, 2006	MA	Manila Mining	PLTL	Piltel	PSE adopted a free-float criterion, which Piltel failed to qualify.

== See also ==
- PSE All Shares Index, index of almost all shares traded in the PSE
