= PSE Financials Index =

The PSE Financials Index, is the main stock market index of the Philippine Stock Exchange for banks and financial entities.

This index is one of the PSE indices also home to companies listed on the PSE Composite Index, namely Banco de Oro Universal Bank, Bank of the Philippine Islands, and Metrobank.

The index is a continuation of the former PSE Financial Index, which was renamed during the reclassification of the PSE's indices on January 2, 2006.

== Companies ==
The following companies are listed on the PSE Financials Index:

| Company | Ticker symbol | IPO |
|---|---|---|
| Banco de Oro | BDO | May 21, 2002 |
| Bank of the Philippine Islands | BPI | October 12, 1971 |
| China Banking Corporation | CHIB | December 1, 1965 |
| COL Financial Group, Inc. ( formerly CitisecOnline, Inc. ) | COL | July 12, 2006 |
| EastWest Bank | EW | may 7, 2012 |
| Metropolitan Bank and Trust Company | MBT | February 26, 1981 |
| Philippine National Bank | PNB | June 21, 1989 |
| Philippine Stock Exchange | PSE | December 15, 2003 |
| Rizal Commercial Banking Corporation | RCB | November 6, 1986 |
| Security Bank Corporation | SECB | June 8, 1995 |
| Union Bank of the Philippines | UBP | June 29, 1992 |

=== Former members ===
| Company | Ticker symbol | IPO | New index |
|---|---|---|---|
| Asiatrust Bank | ASIA | October 8, 1996 | Delisted |
| Bankard | BKD | March 21, 1995 | All Shares |
| Equitable PCI Bank | EPCI | April 3, 1997 | Delisted(Merged with BDO) |
| Export and Industry Bank | EIBA | January 28, 1987 | Suspended |
| International Exchange Bank | IBNK | December 6, 2004 | Delisted (Merger with Unionbank) |
| i-Remit | I | October 17, 2007 | All Shares |
| Manulife Financial Corporation | MFC | September 27, 1999 | All Shares |
| National Reinsurance Corporation of the Philippines | NRCP | April 27, 2007 | All Shares |
| Philippine Savings Bank | PSB | October 10, 1994 | All Shares |
| Sun Life Financial | SLF | March 24, 2000 | All Shares |
| Vantage Equities | V | March 30, 1993 | All Shares |

== See also ==
- Philippine Stock Exchange
