= AREIT =

AREIT may be referred to:

- Australian real estate investment trust (A-REIT)
- AREIT, Inc. A Philippine REIT company
