= Bloomberry =

Holding company

- Company type: Public company
- Industry: Hospitality
- Founded: May 3, 1999; 27 years ago (as Active Alliance Incorporated)
- Headquarters: The Executive Offices, Solaire Resort Entertainment City, 1 Aseana Avenue, Entertainment City, Parañaque City, Metro Manila, Philippines
- Area served: Philippines; South Korea
- Key people: Enrique K. Razon, Jr. (Chairman); Thomas Arasi (President - Retired)
- Website: www.bloomberry.ph

Bloomberry Resorts Corp. (PSE: BLOOM) is a holding company in the Philippines registered with the Securities and Exchange Commission engaged in amusement, tourist facilities, gaming, and hotel businesses. It was incorporated on May 3, 1999 and led by Enrique Razon.

== Background ==
The company's former name was Active Alliance, Incorporated and was mainly engaged in the manufacture and distribution of consumer communication and electronic equipment and operated within the Subic Bay Freeport Zone (SBFZ) until 2003. It was listed on the Philippine Stock Exchange on Oct 17, 2000. In 2013 it was included in the PSE Composite Index and was removed from the list and replaced with Security Bank three years later. It was included again on the index on February 18, 2019.

Bloomberry operates the Solaire Resort and Casino, the company's flagship business, and Jeju Sun Hotel & Casino in Jeju Island, South Korea. In February 2019, the company secured loans for the construction of its second hotel and gaming resort called Solaire North in Quezon City, set to open in 2022.

== Subsidiaries ==
Among its subsidiaries are Sureste Properties, Inc. and Bloomberry Resorts and Hotels, Inc (BRHI), which holds the hotel and gaming licenses for Solaire Resort and Casino. Another subsidiary formed in 2019, Bloomberry Cruise Terminal, Inc. (BCTI), manages and operates BRC's cruise terminal business, including the newly constructed Ilocos Cruise Port in Salomague, Ilocos Sur; and Solaire Cruise Center and Yacht Harbor, a planned cruise terminal adjacent to the Solaire Manila property in Entertainment City.

In South Korea, subsidiary Golden & Luxury Co., Ltd, operates Jeju Sun Hotel & Casino and Muui Agricultural Corporation is the owner of real estate property in Muui island.
