= Semirara Island =

Island in Antique, Philippines

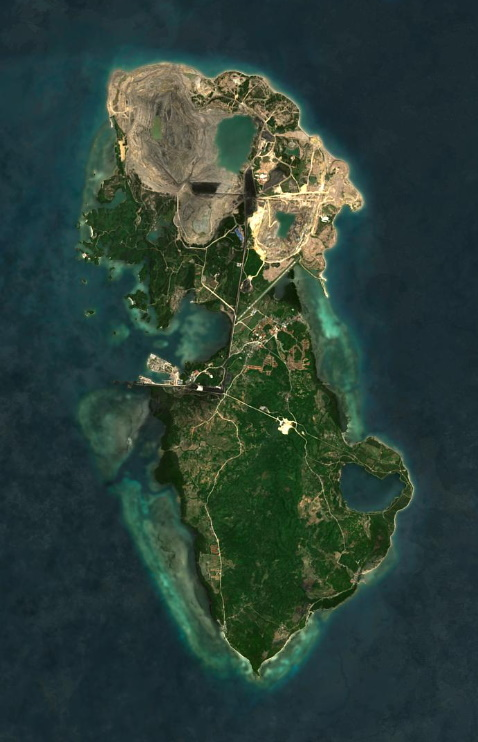
- Composite satellite image of Semirara in 2020
- Interactive map of Semirara Island

Geography
- Location: Tablas Strait
- Coordinates: 12°03′22.6″N 121°23′07.1″E
- Archipelago: Caluya
- Area: 55 km^{2} (21 sq mi)

Administration
- Philippines
- Province: Antique
- Municipality: Caluya
- Barangays: Alegria; Semirara; Tinogbok
- Largest settlement: Semirara (pop. 13,605)

Demographics
- Population: 19,934 (2020)

Semirara is an island in the Philippines located in the Caluya archipelago which is situated south of Mindoro Island. It is under the jurisdiction of the town of Caluya in the province of Antique. It is a major site of coal mining in the Philippines. Other economic activities in the island include fishing, seashell gathering, and farming.

== History ==
A 1905 report documented the island as then being forested, and it was estimated that nearly half the trees were a species of Molave described as "wonderful hard wood", as "scarce along the coasts of the archipelago". This large and readily accessible supply was noted to possibly be of considerable importance. The report also documented a profusion of wild grapes on the island, describing them as edible and similar in size to the Concord grape. and noting that a large quantity of seeds would be brought a forest reserve facility for experimentation aimed at producing a cultivatable variety.

The island was declared a mineral reservation by President Manuel Quezon in 1940 through Proclamation No. 649. Semirara Mining and Power Corp. (SPMC) opened its first coal mine in the island in Unong in 1984 which operated until 2000 and the area's vegetation and lake restored years later. The company then opened several more mines including the Panian Pit which operated until in October 2016 shortly after its coal deposits depleted. SPMC also opened the Narra Pit and the Molave Pit in Semirara Island, both which started commercial operations in the same year.

== Administration ==
Semirara Island is part of the municipality of Caluya in the province of Antique. The island itself consists of three barangays of Caluya: Alegria, Semirara, and Tinogbok.

== Geography ==
Semirara is an island which has a land area of about 55 square kilometers (21 sq mi). The island also has a saltwater lake in its southeastern portion, which was the former site of the Unong mine. A freshwater lake also exists north of the island where the Panian mine used to be.

== Coal mining ==
There are two active coal mines operated by the Semirara Mining and Power Corp. as of January 2020; the Narra Pit and the Molave Pit, both of which are 400 hectares (990 acres) each. Coal in Semirara is characterized as sub-bituminous C coal with a high moisture content based on ASTM.

List of coal mines

- Acacia Pit (2025–present)
- Narra Pit (2016–present)
- Molave Pit 2016–present)
- Panian Pit (1999–2016)
- Unong Pit (1984–2000)

== Transportation ==
Semirara has an airstrip which serves chartered flights from Manila. The island is also accessible by boat, specifically from the town of San Jose in neighboring province of Occidental Mindoro. Motorized tricycles provides a means of land transportation within the island.

== Environment ==
Semirara is host to 21 mangrove species which accounts for 60 percent of the total of 35 recorded mangrove species in the Philippines. Waste produced as a byproduct of coal mining in Semirara has been a concern by residents. Waters adjacent to Semirara also host all recorded giant clam species in the Philippines.

The Semirara Marine Hatchery Laboratory was set up in 2010 by SPMC in the island as the marine rehabilitation arm of the company as well as to develop marine-based livelihood for its host communities.

== See also ==
- Mining in the Philippines
