= Semirara Mining and Power Corporation =

Philippines mining company

- Formerly: Semirara Mining Corporation
- Type: Public
- Traded as: PSE: SCC
- Industry: Mining
- Founded: February 26, 1980; 46 years ago
- Founder: Morales Ocsebio Investment Holdings, Ent.
- Headquarters: 2nd Floor, DMCI Building, 2281 Chino Roces Avenue Extension, Makati, Philippines
- Products: Coal
- Production output: 14.5 million MT (2019)
- Parent: DMCI Holdings
- Website: www.semiraramining.com

The Semirara Mining and Power Corporation (SMPC) is a mining company based in the Philippines. The company, a subsidiary of DMCI Holdings, operates its main coal mine in Semirara Island and is the biggest coal producer in the Philippines accounting for 92 percent of the total national production as of 2015.

== History ==
The company was established on February 26, 1980 as the "Semirara Coal Corporation" (SCC). The company entered an agreement with the Department of Energy for an exclusive right to develop, explore, and mine coal resources on Semirara Island in the town of Caluya, Antique. The company discovered coal mining sites in Semirara in Unong and Panian. In 1981, coal deposits were discovered in a third site; in Himalian. SCC, along with Austrian state firm Voest Alpine opened the first coal mining site in the island in Unong in 1984.

In 1997, DMCI Holdings, Inc. began acquiring in SCC securing 40 percent of the company's common shares which it bought from Voest Alpine. By 1999, DMCI gained a controlling stake in SCC, introducing a new management to the company which was renamed as Semirara Mining Corporation. It also opened the company's second mining site in Panian in anticipation of the Unong mine's closure. SMC was listed in the Philippine Stock Exchange in 2005.

SMC exported its first coal to China in 2007 and has since then expanded its foreign market to include India, Hong Kong, Japan, Taiwan, and Thailand.

It changed its name to the "Semirara Mining and Power Corporation" (SMPC) in 2014 to reflect the expansion of its business to include electricity generation on top of its coal mining operations.

SPMC exhausted the Panian mine in 2016, which was replaced by the Narra and Molave mines within the same year.

In 2018, SMPC relinquish its rights to explore and mine coal in Caluya and Sibay Islands, which neighbors Semirara Island.

== Coal mining ==
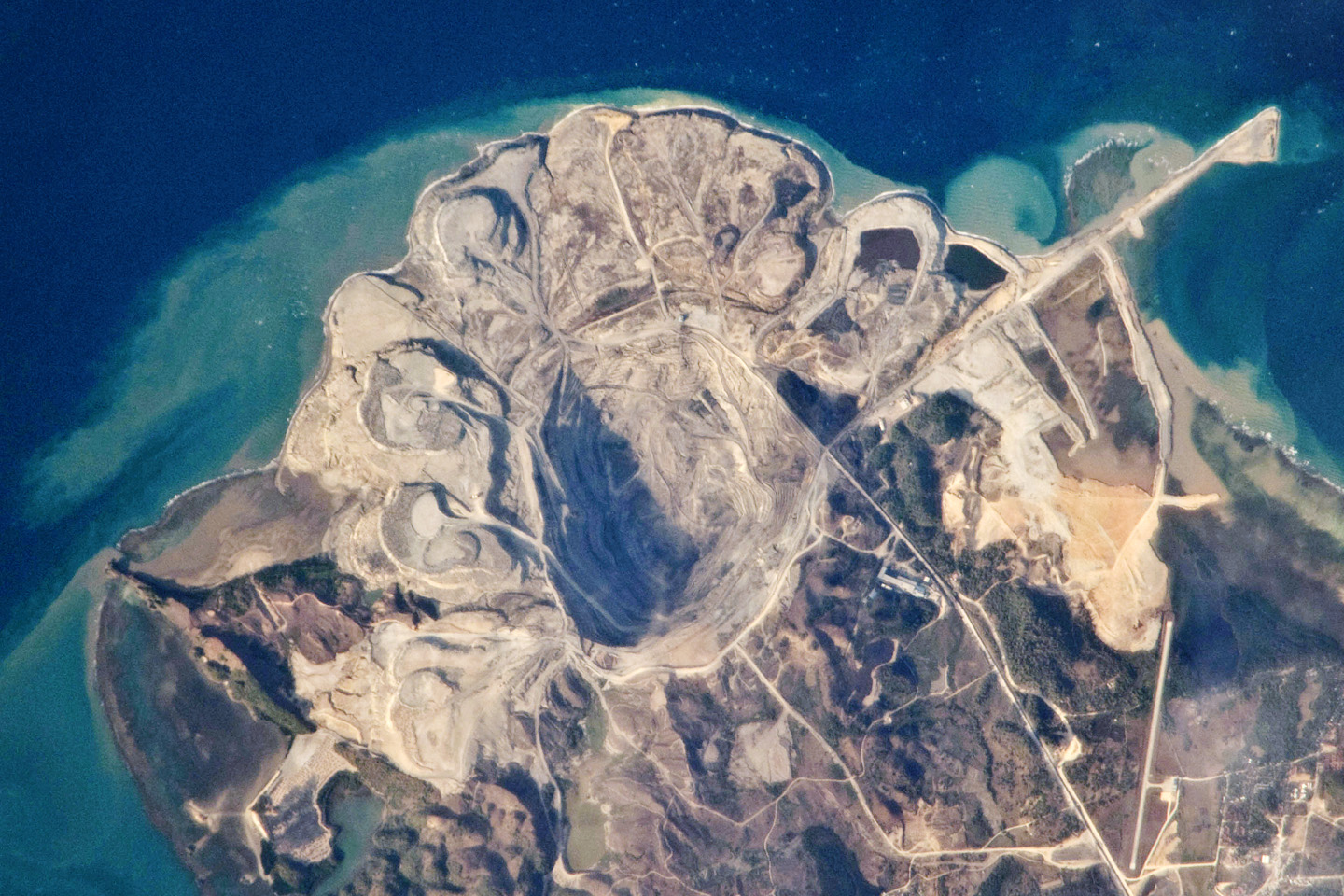
The Panian site in Semirara Island, which is an open cut mine.

SPMPC's primary mining site is in Semirara Island where it has operated numerous coal mines. It operated the Unong Pit in Semirara Island until 2000 and the Panian Pit until 2016. It opened the Narra and Molave Pit in the islands as replacements.

List of coal mines

- Narra Pit (2016–)
- Molave Pit (2016–)
- Panian Pit (1999–2016)
- Unong Pit (1984–2000)

== Accidents ==
In February 2013, at least five miners died after a collapse at the Panian Pit in Semirara Island. Nine miners died in a separate accident in 2015 after a collapse in the same mine caused by a rain-induced landslide.

== See also ==
- Mining in the Philippines
