= Manulife Philippines =

Philippine subsidiary of Manulife

- Company type: Subsidiary
- Traded as: PSE: MFC
- Industry: Insurance, financial services
- Founded: 1901; 124 years ago
- Headquarters: 10th Floor NEX Tower, 6786 Ayala Avenue, Makati, 1229, Philippines
- Number of locations: 47 (as of 2019)
- Area served: Philippines
- Parent: Manulife
- Website: www.manulife.com.ph

Manulife Philippines (also known as The Manufacturers Life Insurance Co. (Phils.), Inc.) is a life insurance company in the Philippines and part of Manulife Financial Corporation, a Canadian life insurance company.

In 2002, Manulife acquired the Philippines business of Metropolitan Life Insurance Company, an insurer based in the United States.
