= Philodrill =

Philippines petroleum exploration company

- Traded as: PSE: OV
- Industry: Petroleum
- Founded: June 26, 1969
- Headquarters: Mandaluyong, Philippines
- Revenue: ▼ ₱294.22 million (2019)
- Total assets: ▼ ₱3.35 billion (2019)
- Total equity: ▼ ₱3.23 billion (2019)
- Website: www.philodrill.com

The Philodrill Corporation is a petroleum exploration company based in the Philippines and publicly listed on the Philippine Stock Exchange (PSE: OV). Its primary business is focused on exploring, developing, and producing oil, gas, and minerals products. Currently, it's a diversified holding company with interests in real estate, financial industry, mineral extraction, and infrastructure development.

== History ==
One of the leading conglomerates in the Philippines, the Philodrill Corporation was established on June 26, 1969. It is considered one of the pioneers in the industry of oil exploration in the country, and its headquarter is located in Mandaluyong, Philippines.

In 1989, its petition to amend its primary business purpose to become a diversified holding company was approved by the Securities and Exchange Commission (SEC). The move was meant to cushion the risks associated with the petroleum industry. However, it again petitioned the SEC to make petroleum exploration and production as its primary purpose while retaining the holding company as secondary purpose, which was permitted on April 13, 2009. The SEC approved its application to renew its corporate term for the next 50 years on January 18, 2018, with the new term taking effect by June 25, 2019.

In 2006, the company announced that it's divesting its interest in Penta Capital Investment Corporation, an investment house that provides money management services including underwriting services, in order to focus on the core business of oil exploration. The PSE and SEC approved its stock rights offering worth 38.37 billion stock rights, with the offer scheduled in 2009.

When the government opened the Fourth Philippine Energy Contracting Round, the Philodrill Corporation formed consortium with Philex Mining Corporation, Philex Petroleum Corporation, and Pitkin Petroleum Plc of UK in 2012. to bid for new oil and gas blocks.

Public ownership of the company was at 47.78%. The Ramos family, which founded and managed the National Bookstore retail chain, owns 8.879% or 17.03 billion common shares. The Alakor Corporation, which is led by the Ramos family, owns 9.07% or 17.5 billion shares. As a public company, it is one of the 55 firms judged Shariah-compliant by the Philippine Stock Exchange.

== Petroleum explorations ==
The company signed various contracts that cover production, exploration, and geophysical survey in the country with the Philippine government through the office of the Department of Energy (DOE). Its exploration activities are located in offshore Palawan and onshore Mindoro areas, which is under service contract SC 53. It has interests in 11 service contracts with the government, including SC14C1 located offshore in the northwestern waters of Palawan that also covered the Galoc oil field, the country's sole producer of oil of commercial scale. Moreover, the company is under DOE's service contracts SC 6A and SC 6B in Octon and Bonita, which are both located in northern Palawan, as well as SC 14A & B in Nido, Matinloc, and north Matinloc. The Nido block (producing 18.82 million barrels), Matinlo block (12.14 million barrels), and North Matinloc (2.22 million barrels) are all located in northwest Palawan.

In addition, it conducts active petroleum exploration and production in offshore South Sulu Sea under the service contract SC 41 and the Swan Block, which is in the deepwater in northwest Palawan.

== Business interests ==
As an investment holding company, the company has interests in investments in other industries aside from petroleum such as real estate, mining, venture capital and financial services. It owns a 40% stake at Penta Capital Investment Corporation. An investment institution, Penta Capital Investment Corporation is majority shareholder (98.75%) of the capital company Penta Capital Finance Corporation. It also owns 29.54% of the investment holding house Penta Capital Holdings Inc (PCHI), 100% of Penta Capital Realty Corporation, and 68.47% of Intra-Invest Securities. Moreover, The Philodrill Corporation owns direct shares representing 13.21% of PCHI.
