= DMCI Homes =

Real estate arm of DMCI Holdings

DMCI Holdings
- Type: Subsidiary
- Founded: April 27, 1995; 31 years ago
- Founder: David Mendoza Consunji
- Headquarters: DMCI Homes Corporate Center, Makati, Philippines
- Key people: Isidro A. Consunji, (Chairman and President)
- Revenue: PHP 87.8 billion (approx US$1.8 billion USD) (2020)
- Net income: PHP 14.8 billion (approx US$306.2 million USD) (2020)
- Parent: DMCI Holdings
- Website: www.dmcihomes.com

DMCI Homes, Inc. is the real estate arm of DMCI Holdings (PSE: DMC) through its wholly owned subsidiary DMCI Project Developers, Inc. (PDI). It was incorporated and registered with the Securities and Exchange Commission (SEC) on April 27, 1995. It ranked #146 in the Business World Top 1000 Corporations for 2014 and Top 1000 Corporations in the Philippines: Capturing the Big Picture of the Country's corporate scene cited by BusinessWorld.

== History ==
From 1995 to 2008, DMCI Homes was headquartered in Dacon Plaza, 1728 Don Chino Roces Avenue Extension, Makati, sharing the office with DMCI and Semirara Mining Corporation. Total manpower started at around 75 employees and grew to 600, prompting the need to transfer to DMCI Homes Corporate Center at 1321 Apolinario St., Brgy. Bangkal, Makati (former Intel Building). As of 2012, DMCI Homes’ employees number at around 1,400.

DMCI Homes started commercial operations in 1999 when it constructed its first Medium-Rise Development, the Lake View Manors, in Taguig.

In 2000, the first DMCI Homes hybrid development (mid- and High-Rise Buildings in a property) (Hampstead Gardens Condominium) was constructed. It introduced the Pin Wheel Architectural Design, which optimized the flow of fresh air and ambient light into the building.

In 2004, the first themed Medium Rise Development, the Mayfield Park Residences in Rizal, was constructed. It featured Neo-Asian influences in the buildings’ architecture and landscaping.

In 2006, DMCI Homes ventured into leisure residences by constructing Alta Vista de Boracay in Malay, Aklan. In the same year, Lumiventt Design Technology was also introduced during the development of Tivoli Garden Residences, Mandaluyong.

In 2017, DMCI Homes became the Philippines' first real-estate firm to be recognized as a quadruple A contractor. The notice on DMCI Homes’ upgraded category was released last January 18 by Philippine Contractors Accreditation Board (PCAB), the implementing arm of the Construction Industry Authority of the Philippines (CIAP) under Department of Trade and Industry (DTI).

In the same year, DMCI Homes was also recognized at the Dot Property Philippines Awards 2017 as Best Developer in Davao City for Verdon Parc, its first development in Mindanao. It also received an Award of Distinction for its Corporate Website in the 23rd Communicator Awards.

Cesar A. Buenaventura, eldest brother of Rafael Buenaventura, as vice chairman of DMCI Holdings, purchased P 2.769 million DMC shares (P10.80 to P11.26 per share) on April 16 and 17, 2024, as a result he now owns 6.7 million shares or P67.5 million.

In September 2024, DMCI Homes received its 12th "Top 10 Developers Award" at the BCI Asia Awards.

== Holding firm ==
DMCI Holdings, Inc. was incorporated as a holding company on March 8, 1995, to consolidate all the Consunji family's construction businesses, construction component companies, and related interests. It was listed on the Philippine Stock Exchange on December 18, 1995.

== Affiliates ==
=== General construction ===
D.M. Consunji Inc. is a wholly owned subsidiary engaged in general construction services – the company's core business. The subsidiary was founded in 1954. In late 1992, it received an award from the Construction Industry Authority of the Philippines for outstanding constructor in the building category from 1986 to 1992.

==== Structures constructed ====
Some of the landmark infrastructures that DMCI built include:

- Solaire Resort & Casino (Entertainment City, Bay City, Paranaque City)
- SM Megamall (Mandaluyong)
- Shangri-La's Mactan Resort & Spa, Cebu (Mactan, Lapu-Lapu City, Cebu)
- Makati Shangri-La, Manila (Makati)
- Shangri-la Resorts & Spa Boracay (Malay, Aklan)
- Manila Hotel (Rizal Park, Manila)
- Philippine International Convention Center (CCP Complex, Roxas Boulevard, Pasay)
- Sofitel Philippine Plaza Manila (CCP Complex, Roxas Boulevard, Pasay)
- Cultural Center of the Philippines Complex (Roxas Boulevard, Pasay)
- Ayala Tower One (Makati)
- The New Istana Palace (Sultan's Palace, Brunei Darussalam)
- Asian Hospital and Medical Center (Filinvest City, Muntinlupa)
- Manila Doctors Hospital (UN Avenue, Manila)
- NAIA Expressway Phase 2
- Metro Manila Skyway Stage 2 and Stage 3 (Sections 1&2)
- Tarlac–Pangasinan–La Union Expressway
- Cavite–Laguna Expressway Laguna segment
- NLEX Connector (Caloocan-España section)
- LRT Line 2 East Extension (Masinag Extension)
- North–South Commuter Railway Contract Packages CP 01 (Valenzuela-Bocaue section) and CP S-02 (Blumentritt-Paco section)
- Metro Manila Subway Contract Package CP 102 (Quezon Avenue and East Avenue stations)

=== Mining ===
- Semirara Mining and Power Corporation (SMPC), a 56%-owned subsidiary, is a publicly listed company engaged in the exploration, mining and development of coal resources on Semirara Island in Caluya, Antique. The company's truck and shovel operations produce about 16 million metric tons of coal per year.
- DMCI Mining Corporation (DMC) is a 100%-owned subsidiary engaged in ore and mineral mining and exploration. The mining operation is an open pit extraction of nickel, chromite, and iron laterite for direct shipping. It was incorporated on May 29, 2007. In 2025, the business reached a record nickel ore output of 2 million wet metric tons (WMT).

=== Water ===
- DMCI-MPIC Water Company, Inc. (DMWCI) was a joint venture between Metro Pacific Investments Corporation (MPIC) and DMCI Holdings, Inc. to acquire Maynilad Water Services, Inc. (Maynilad) in 2007. In 2015, Maynilad served 1,265,625 accounts in its service area, the West Zone. In 2026, Maynilad planned to spend between P26 and P30 billion to fund water and wastewater projects within its service areas. At the time, operated 23 wastewater facilities.
- Subic Water and Sewerage Company was the first privatized water company in the Philippines and Southeast Asia to be ISO certified is a joint venture with three other companies: Biwater, the British water utility specialist, Subic Bay Metropolitan Authority (SBMA), and Olongapo City Water District (OCWD).

=== Power ===
- DMCI Power Corporation (DPC) is a 100%-owned subsidiary engaged in the business of a generation company that designs, constructs, invests in and operates power plants.
- Sem-Calaca Power Corporation (Sem-Calaca) is 100%-owned by Semirara. It was incorporated on November 19, 2009, aimed primarily to acquire, expand, and maintain power generating plants, develop fuel for the generation of electricity, and sell electricity.

=== Infrastructure ===
- Private Infra Development Corp. (PIDC) – On September 11, 2009, the company subscribed to 1,449,684 representing 32.22% equity interest in Private Infra Development Corporation for the Tarlac–Pangasinan–La Union Expressway (TPLEX) Project. TPLEX is an 88-km two-lane toll road with a 35-year concession, including a 5-year construction period.
