= PSE Mining and Oil Index =

The PSE Mining and Oil Index is the sub-index of the Philippine Stock Exchange for mining and oil companies. It is one of the six sub-indices of the PSE that provide a useful measurement of sectoral performance.

Lepanto Consolidated Mining Company and Philex Mining Corporation used to be listed in the PSE until their removal in the 2010s. However, this index is known to be one of the best performing indices on the PSE in recent years with the recent revival of the Philippine mining industry.

The index is composed of the former PSE Mining Index and the PSE Oil Index. Both indices were merged in a reclassification of the PSE's indices on January 1, 2006.

== Companies ==
The following companies are listed on the PSE Mining and Oil Index:

- Abra Mining and Industrial Corporation (ticker symbol: AR)
- Atlas Consolidated Mining and Development Corporation (ticker symbol: AT)
- Lepanto Consolidated Mining Company (ticker symbols: LC and LCB)
- Manila Mining Corporation (ticker symbols: MA and MAB)
- Philex Mining Corporation (ticker symbols: PX and PXB)
- United Paragon Mining Corporation (ticker symbol: UPM)

== See also ==
- Philippine Stock Exchange
