= DigiPlus =

Gambling company in the Philippines

DigiPlus Interactive Corp.
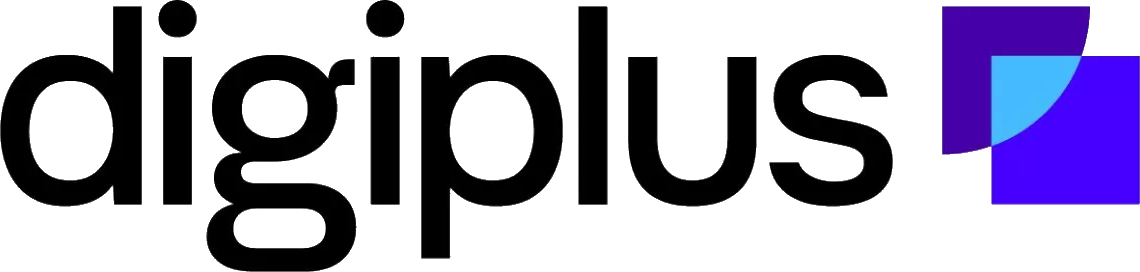
- Formerly: Atlas Fertilizer Corporation; Leisure and Resorts World Corporation
- Type: Public
- Traded as: PSE: PLUS
- Industry: Gambling
- Founded: October 10, 1957; 69 years ago
- Headquarters: 32-36F Ecoprime Building, 32nd St, corner 9th Ave, Bonifacio Global City, Taguig, Metro Manila, Philippines
- Key people: Andy Tsui (President); Eusebio Tanco (Chairman)
- Brands: Arena Plus; Bingo Plus
- Services: Online gambling Bookmaking
- Revenue: ₱27.3 billion (2023)
- Net income: ₱4.1 billion (2023)
- Subsidiaries: AB Leisure Exponent Inc.; Total Gamezone Xtreme, Inc.; BingoPlus Foundation
- Website: digiplus.com.ph

DigiPlus Interactive Corporation is a Philippine gambling company involved in bingo and sports betting.

== History ==
DigiPlus Interactive Corporation was incorporated as the Atlas Fertilizer Corporation on October 10, 1957, and operated as a firm meant to be involved in fertilizer and industrial chemicals production. The company later became the Leisure and Resorts World Corporation (LRWC).

AB Leisure Exponent Inc. (ABLE) which became LRWC's subsidiary was established on December 28, 1994. The following year, ABLE was given a license to operate bingo games under the name Bingo Bonanza Corporation. In 1996, a company restructuring occur with ABLE using LRWC to list its assets and businesses. In 1999, LRWC changed its purpose to realty development focusing on leisure business

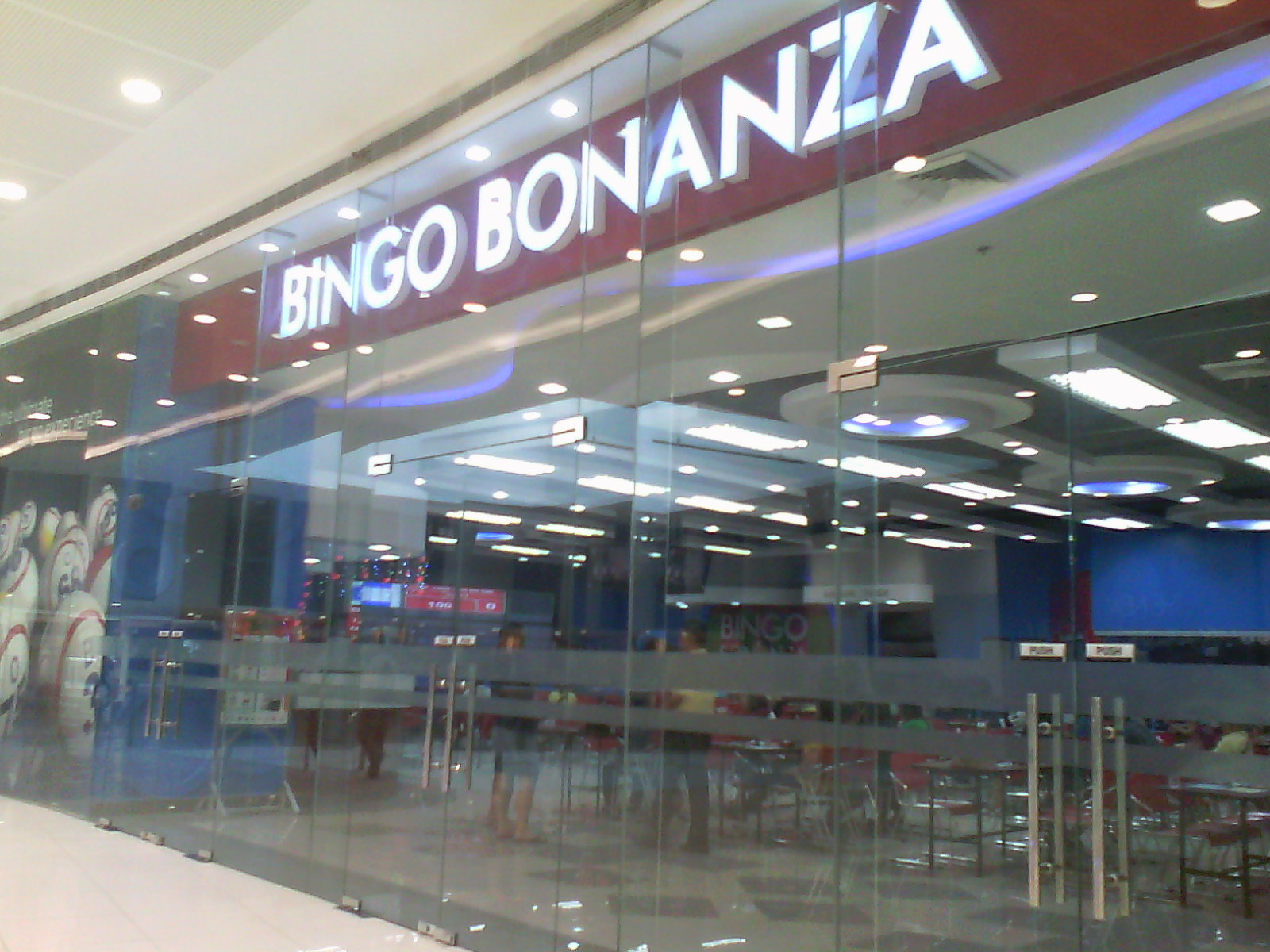
Bingo Bonanza outlet in SM Megamall in Mandaluyong in 2014

In 2014, LRWC fully acquired e-games operator Total Gamezone Extreme Inc. (TGXI) which was operating 45 e-games branches at the time.

By 2016, ABLE's bingo network has grown to 134 bingo parlors. But Philippine Amusement and Gaming Corporation (PAGCOR) ordered closure ABLE and TGXI's 53 gambling outlets due to violations of provisions mandating such sites to be more than 200 meters (660 ft) away from school and churches. PAGCOR later allowed them to continue operations granting exemption on outlets located inside shopping malls.

Taking advantage of the COVID-19 pandemic, the LRWC launched Bingo Plus in January 2022 allowing potential players to play livestreamed bingo. It replaced Bingo Bonanza. The company received an Online Traditional Bingo (OTB) license from PAGCOR within the same year.

In February 2023, DigiPlus Interactive (DigiPlus) adopted its current name.

DigiPlus, a Philippine Stock Exchange-listed company, acknowledged the steep fall of its stock prices in July 2025 due to growing calls for stricter regulation or outright ban of online gambling in the Congress.

DigiPlus enter the Brazil market in September 2025.

== Gambling services ==
As of 2025, DigiPlus has three gambling brands directly under its portfolio.

=== Arena Plus ===
Arena Plus (stylized as ArenaPlus) is an 24/7 online sports betting platform launched in February 2023. The platform covers various leagues worldwide including the Philippine Basketball Association, National Basketball Association, and the Premier Volleyball League.

=== Bingo Plus ===
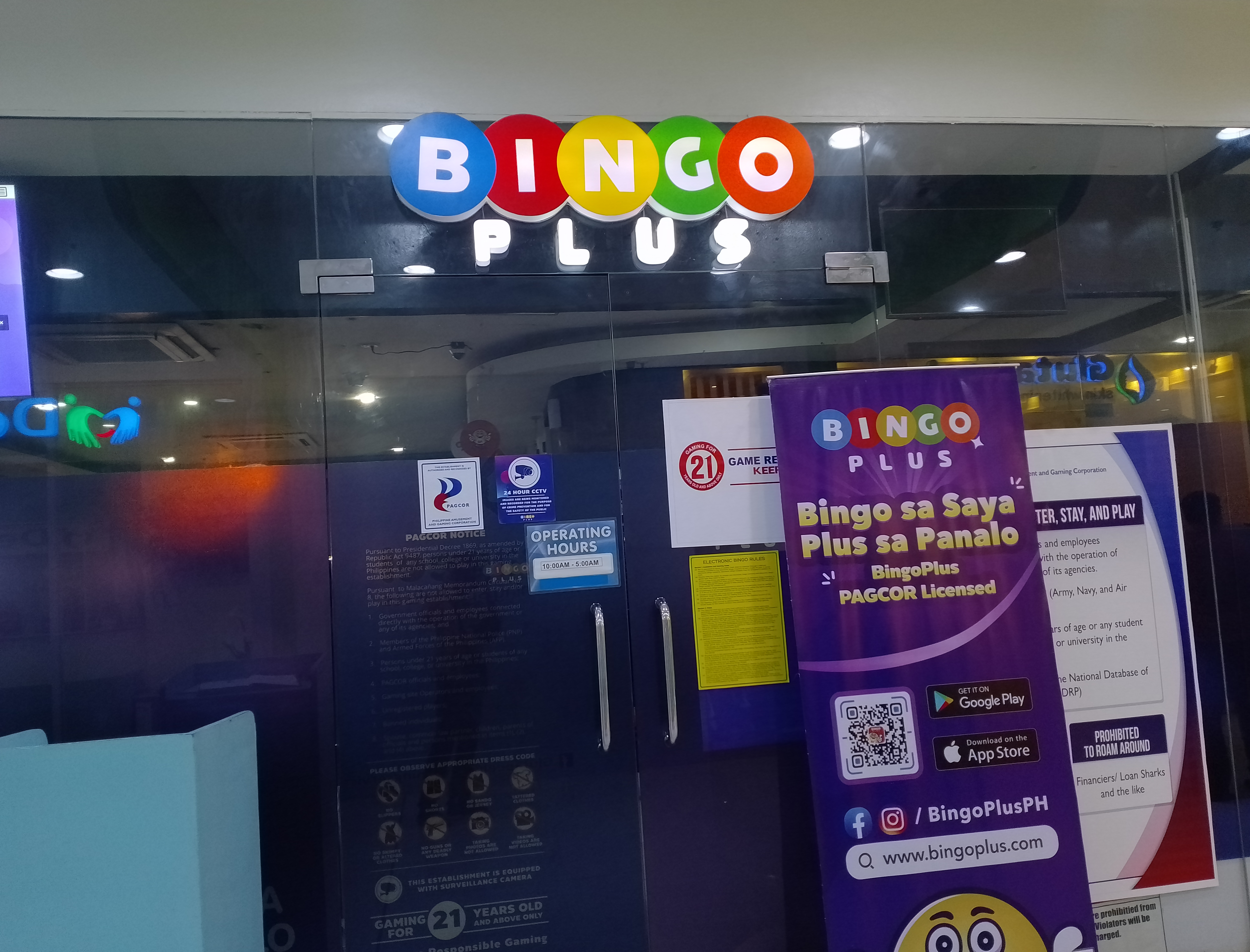
Bingo Plus at Parkmall in Mandaue, Cebu.

Bingo Plus (stylized as BingoPlus) is an online bingo platform in the Philippines owned by DigiPlus Interactive.

DigiPlus Interactive is accredited by the Philippine Amusement and Gaming Corporation (PAGCOR) and is legally mandated to cater to customers at least 21 years of age. Bingo Plus is accessible via its website and mobile applications in Android and IOS. A player can place a bet as low as one Philippine peso. The largest jackpot awarded in Bingo Plus is ₱151 million on November 25, 2024.

Before Bingo Plus, DigiPlus operated Bingo Bonanza which was an electronic bingo hall chain often is housed inside shopping malls. As of 2016, there are 129 bingo parlors.

Aside from bingo, Bingo Plus includes tong-its and perya (fair) games.

=== Game Zone ===
Game Zone (stylized as GameZone) is an online gambling platform. It enables player vs player (PVP) games involving classic card and betting games like tong-its, pusoy, and Lucky Nine.

It had a grand launch on May 28, 2025, under ABLE. Previously it was launched on July 15, 2021, after LRWC subsidiary Total Gamezone Xtreme, Inc. (TGXI) was given an electronic gaming system (EGS) license by PAGCOR.

== Other subsidiaries and ventures ==
DigiPlus controls 70 percent stakes on the First Cagayan Leisure and Resort Corp., a company authorized by the Cagayan Economic Zone Authority to license and regulate online casinos and sports betting operations within the Cagayan Special Economic Zone. DigiPlus' corporate social responsibility arm is the BingoPlus Foundation.

DigiPlus acquired 51 percent stake on Midas Hotel and Casino of Zaldy Co's Eco Leisure and Hospitality Holding Co. in 2012. In 2019, Digiplus decided to divest its shares following internal disagreements and secured a prospective buyer. Eco Leisure exercised its right of first refusal offering ₱2.5 billion to purchase back Digiplus' shares. However Eco Leisure later offered ₱1 billion instead citing reimbursement claims for expenses. A legal dispute arose between Eco Leisure and DigiPlus since 2020 with the former alleging the latter has financial obligations with it. The arbitration tribunal ruled in favor of DigiPlus and was elevated to the Pasig Regional Trial Court in 2022.

== GSIS investment ==
Philippine Senate Deputy Minority Leader and Chairman of the Committee on Women, Children, Family Relations and Gender Equality Risa Hontiveros stated during a Senate session on August 5, stated that Government Service Insurance System (GSIS) allegedly invested 1 billion pesos on DigiPlus. Hontiveros stated that "According to the Ombudsman, Mr. Veloso and his fellow GSIS officials may have committed serious misconduct when they entered into an agreement to purchase Alternergy’s Perpetual Preferred Shares without the approval of the GSIS Board of Trustees, and in clear violation of the GSIS’s own investment policies and guidelines." Senator Raffy Tulfo, who is the Chairman of the Committee on Games and Amusement, said he is willing to investigate the issue. GSIS issued a statement on August 7, and defended its stand on P1 billion investment in DigiPlus, saying the state pension fund remained "strong, secure, and actuarially sound" despite growing public concern and scrutiny from lawmakers.
