= PLDT Communication and Energy Ventures =

PLDT Communications and Energy Ventures Inc.
- Company type: Privately-held holding company
- Industry: Investment management
- Founded: Manila, Philippines (July 18, 1968)
- Headquarters: Makati, Philippines
- Key people: Manuel V. Pangilinan, Chairman; Napoleon L. Nazareno, President and CEO
- Revenue: P8.88 billion PHP (▲17.67%) (June 30, 2008)
- Net income: P5.2 billion PHP (▲46.34%) (June 30, 2008)
- Parent: PLDT (Smart Communications)

The PLDT Communications and Energy Ventures Inc. former ticker symbol (PSE: PCEV), formerly known as Pilipino Telephone Corporation or Piltel former ticker symbol (PSE: PLTL), is a holding company of the PLDT Group for its venture into the electricity distribution industry. Previously, it was one of the mobile and fixed-line telephone service providers in the Philippines. PCEV is 99.5%-owned by Smart Communications, a wholly-owned subsidiary of the Philippine Long Distance Telephone Company (PLDT). The remaining 0.5% of PCEV's shares is owned by the Filipino investing public. Through PCEV, PLDT formed a consortium with sister company Metro Pacific Investments Corporation (MPIC) to form Beacon Electric Asset Holdings, Inc. which is the majority owner of Meralco. In 2017, PLDT transferred (sold) its shares in Beacon to MPIC.

== History ==
Piltel was incorporated with limited liability on July 18, 1968. It started its business by providing landline services in eight cities and municipalities in the Philippines: Baguio City, General Santos, Olongapo, Subic, Puerto Princesa, Digos, Boac and Masbate.

In March 1991, Piltel started offering cellular phone services branded Mobiline, using the AMPS standard. In August 1993, Piltel launched it paging business called Beeper 150. In July 1995, Piltel had its shares listed in the Philippine Stock Exchange.

By 1996, Piltel dominated the market with 42% market share. However, in that same year, cellular fraud or cloning became rampant in the Philippines. This prompted Piltel to upgrade its AMPS network to the CDMA standard. It was also in the same year that Executive Order No. 109 was implemented, thus, Piltel had to expand its landline services to unserved and underserved areas in southern and western Mindanao.

Unluckily, in July 1997, a financial crisis that started in Thailand spread across neighboring countries in Asia. This, together with rising inflation, the cost of upgrades and expansion, loss of wireless subscriber confidence because of the cloning problem in the previous year, and lack of subscriber interest in the newly installed Mindanao landline network because of the financial crisis; started to weigh heavily on the finances of Piltel.

On top of it, intensified competition started eating into Piltel's wireless market subscriber share. In 1998, competitors using the GSM standard started promoting the use of SMS, which has since become the most preferred communication method of the Filipinos. Before Piltel had the chance to add SMS facilities to its CDMA network, it was already deep into the red with Php4.1 billion worth of losses as of end-1998.

In November 1999, Piltel's management decided to stop investing in its AMPS/CDMA networks. Moving forward, on April 1, 2000, Piltel signed a facilities-sharing agreement with competitor Smart Communications to be able to provide wireless services using Smart's GSM network. By the same day, Piltel launched its GSM brand, Talk 'N Text.

In March 2004, Smart Communications acquired 45.3% stake in Piltel from its parent PLDT.

Since then, most of Piltel's employees have been absorbed by Smart Communications. Likewise, the management of its wireless business have also been outsourced to Smart Communications. The Beeper 150 network was already shut down, and its landline business was sold to PLDT on June 4, 2008.

As of July 29, 2009, Smart Communications completed its tender offer to buy out most of Piltel's other minority shareholders, thereby raising its ownership to 99.5%. On August 17, 2009, Piltel completed the transfer of its wireless businesses to Smart Communications.

On May 25, 2010, Piltel renamed to its current name after the Securities and Exchange Commission (SEC) approved the change in its corporate name, as well as other amendments to the Company's Articles of Incorporation.

== Subsidiaries ==
The following are Piltel's wholly owned subsidiaries:

- Telecommunications Service Providers (Telserv) - Phils : involved in operator services
- Piltel International Holdings Corporation (PIHC) - British Virgin Islands : involved in the issuance of bonds convertible into common shares of Piltel
- Piltel (Cayman) Ltd. - Cayman Islands : involved in bringing into the debt restructuring plan holders of Piltel's convertible bonds

== Wireless ==
Today, Piltel is no longer a wireless services operator. Before the transfer, Piltel used its AMPS/CDMA networks to lease out telephone lines to a few corporate subscribers, and has decommissioned all but six of its AMPS/CDMA cellsites. Likewise, Piltel also reported 16,590,737 subscribers to its GSM brand, Talk 'N Text, just before the transfer.

== Philippine area code assignment ==
Piltel used the 912 area code for its AMPS/CDMA service. However, it is now used for the Talk 'N Text brand, which was transferred to Smart Communications.

== Ownership ==
- Smart Communications: 99.5%
- Public stock: 0.5%

== Competition ==
Piltel's main competitors were Smart Communications, Globe Telecom and formerly, Sun Cellular in the mobile market. It previously competed with carriers such as Digitel and Bayan Telecommunications (BayanTel) in the fixed-line market.

== Sports ==
Piltel formerly owned the Mobiline Phone Pals of the Philippine Basketball Association from 1996 Governors' Cup until 2001 Commissioner's Cup, and now transferred to Smart Communications and renamed as TNT Tropang Giga.
