= Caluya =

Municipality in Antique, Philippines

- Municipality
- Municipality of Caluya
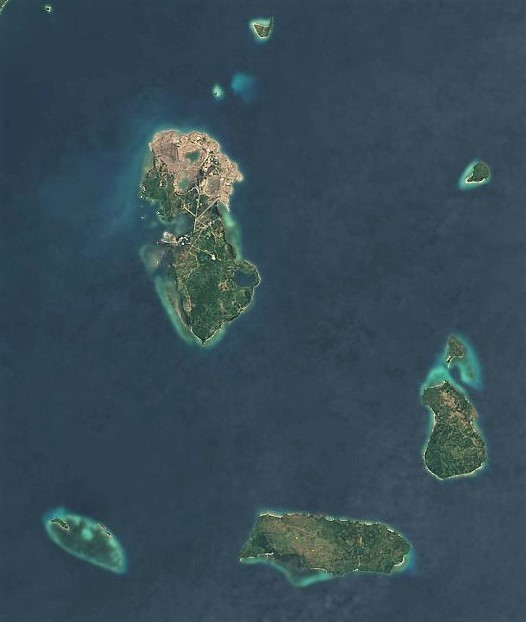
- Caluya islands satellite image captured by Sentinel-2 in 2016

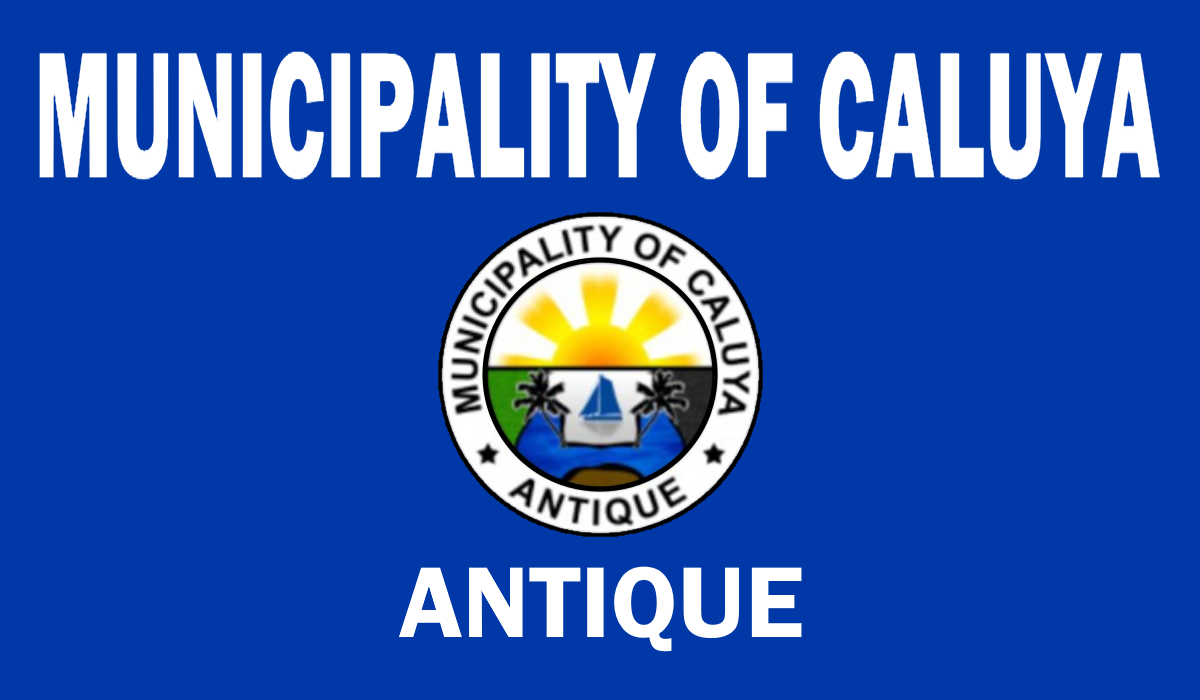
- Flag

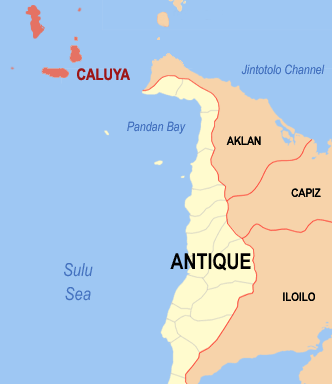
- Map of Antique with Caluya highlighted
- Interactive map of Caluya
- Location in the Philippines
- Coordinates: 11°55′55″N 121°32′53″E
- Country: Philippines
- Region: Western Visayas
- Province: Antique
- District: Lone district
- Barangays: 18 (see Barangays)

Government
  - Type: Sangguniang Bayan
  - Mayor: Rigil Kent G. Lim
  - Vice Mayor: Genevive L. Reyes
  - Representative: [Antonio Agapito Legarda]]
  - Municipal Council: Members: Belfe S. Duran; Diosdado L. Egina; Efren S. Contreras Jr.; Siegfred T. Cipres; Rea C. Domingo; Elvero A. de San Jose; Ruben P. Janairo; Ricky M. Lavega
  - Electorate: 25,718 voters (2025)

Area
  - Total: 132.13 km^{2} (51.02 sq mi)
- Elevation: 5.0 m (16.4 ft)
- Highest elevation (Mount Caluya): 170 m (560 ft)
- Lowest elevation: 0 m (0 ft)

Population (2024 census)
  - Total: 42,895
  - Density: 324.64/km^{2} (840.82/sq mi)
  - Households: 9,044
- Demonym: Caluyanon

Economy
  - Income class: 1st municipal income class
  - Poverty incidence: 22.76% (2023)
  - Revenue: ₱ 275.6 million (2024)
  - Assets: ₱ 8,036 million (2024)
  - Expenditure: ₱ 906.6 million (2024)
  - Liabilities: ₱ 893 million (2024)

Service provider
  - Electricity: Antique Electric Cooperative (ANTECO)
- Time zone: UTC+8 (PST)
- ZIP code: 5711
- PSGC: 0600605000
- IDD : area code: +63 (0)36
- Native languages: Caluyanon; Karay-a; Hiligaynon; Tagalog

Caluya, officially the Municipality of Caluya (Kinaray-a: Banwa kang Caluya; Hiligaynon: Banwa sang Caluya; Tagalog: Bayan ng Caluya), is a municipality in the province of Antique, Philippines. According to the 2024 census, it has a population of 42,895 people, making it the sixth most populous municipality in the province.

Semirara Island has an area of 55 km^{2} (21 sq mi), and is home to the Panian Mine, a vast open-pit coal mine in operation since 1999, and the Unong Mine, which was active from 1984 to 2000.

== History ==
The Island of Caluya was once called Polo Pandan by Moro pirates searching for commercial ships as target victims. These pirates with their pillager vintas called salipsipan utilized the place for haven and rest after divesting ships of valuable belongings. In fear of the pirates, only few fishermen dared to fish in the area. The Moro pirates called the place Polo Pandan because the entire coastal area was covered by pandan screw pines.

Several years later, fishermen from other islands, who were catching turtles for Chinese traders using their fish gears called panalog, accidentally landed in Polo Pandan in search of drinking water. They were surprised to see footprints of humans in the sand but no houses could be seen. They found a potable spring coming from the roots of a dankalan tree. They brought the good news to other fishermen and settled by the shore near that spring. They made huts (barong-barong) for their families and continued with their fishing activities. Eventually, the Moro pirates landed at the other side of the island. The settlers feared for the safety of their families, so they transferred their huts to the hilltop and called the place "Minoro or Barabanwa."

One day, while all the male settlers were out looking for food and fishing, the Moro pirates surfaced and an amazon named Merin gathered all women to defend their settlement. The Moro leader, upon seeing the amazons, ordered his men to retreat for according to him, the women were weak or maluya in vernacular. Thus the name Polo Pandan was changed to Maluya in honor of famous hero Merin. The island soon became Caluya.

=== Spanish settlement ===
The Spanish settlement in Caluya was established around 1850. Spanish friars came to the island to propagate their colonization of the archipelago. The settlement was called Barangay and the first cabeza de barangay was Balbino Alojado (later changed his surname to Ysug) succeeded by Luciano Boctot and then by Surato Bunga-Bunga. All other cabezas de barangay was not recorded.

Later on, the cabeza de barangay became capitan de barangay. The first capitan de barangay was Lozaro Decena succeeded by Luciano Tabangay and then by Mariano Escultor.

In the year 1893, believed to be in the month of May, Barangay was changed to Pueblo or town by the Spanish Government, hence the founding of the Municipality of Caluya.

=== American regime ===
The American Government started in 1901. Caluya was run by the people from Bulalacao, Oriental Mindoro and became its town. The first officials were appointed by Americans but later, the officials were elected by the people. The head of the local government was the Town President or Presidente del Pueblo. Appointed President from 1901 to 1910 was Feliciano Erodias. Next was Valentin Escultor in 1911. Then they held the first election in 1913 and the first elected president was Moises Lucena. In 1916, the President was Elias Tameta; 1919, Luis Erodias; 1922, Agustin Madarcos; 1925, Pedro Janairo; and 1928, Ruperto Tabinas.

In 1934, the head of the town was changed to a town Mayor. The 1st town Mayor was Claro Erodias who served up to 1938. Ruperto Tabinas was the town Mayor when the World War II broke out.

=== Japanese occupation ===
In 1943, the Japanese landed in Caluya by means of motorboat and spread their propaganda about the government. No battle had been fought for there were no soldiers in the island. The Japanese commandeered pigs, carabaos, cows, chickens and other foods for consumption.

The only battle fought was in Semirara. It was between the five Japanese battle ships and the U.S. Air force. War ships were sunk and an airplane from the Allied Force was drowned. About 200 Japanese marines fled to Capiz Island led by Commander Tanaka. There was no known Mayor at that time.

=== Post-liberation period ===
In 1945, Mr. Joven Janairo was appointed mayor and was later elected to the position in the 1948 elections. He was succeeded by Romulo Lumawig in 1953, but was re-elected in 1958. Lumawig was again re-elected in 1964, and Oscar Lim was elected in 1972. Shortly thereafter, President Ferdinand Marcos martial law.

In 1987, Douglas Egina was appointed as Officer-in-Charge (OIC) Mayor. In 1988, Oscar Lim was re-elected to the position. In the 1992 elections, Nikita L. Frangue became the first woman mayor and was later succeeded by her husband, Domingo G. Frangue Jr., who served from July 1, 2001, to June 30, 2007. Reynante J. Lim Sr. served as municipal mayor from July 1, 2007, until his death on February 28, 2010. Diosdado L. Egina then served as acting mayor from March 1 to June 30, 2010. Genevive G. Lim-Reyes currently serves as the municipal mayor of Caluya.

== Geography ==
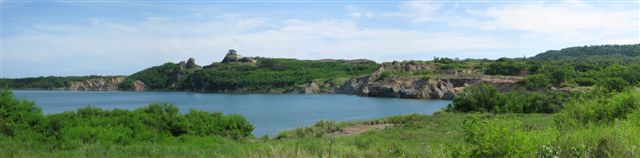
Unong Lake

Caluya is located at 11°55′55″N 121°32′53″E.

According to the Philippine Statistics Authority, the municipality has a land area of 132.13 square kilometres (51.02 sq mi) constituting 4.84% of the 2,729.17-square-kilometre- (1,053.74 sq mi) total area of Antique.

List of islands in Caluya by land area: Semirara Island 55 km^{2} (21 sq mi) Sibay Island 41.3 km^{2} (15.9 sq mi) Caluya Island 24.4 km^{2} (9.4 sq mi) Sibolo Island 1.78 km^{2} (0.69 sq mi) Sibato Island 1.61 km^{2} (0.62 sq mi).

=== Climate ===
Climate data for Caluya, Antique
Month	Jan	Feb	Mar	Apr	May	Jun	Jul	Aug	Sep	Oct	Nov	Dec	Year
Mean daily maximum °C (°F)	28 (82)	29 (84)	30 (86)	31 (88)	31 (88)	30 (86)	29 (84)	29 (84)	29 (84)	29 (84)	29 (84)	28 (82)	29 (85)
Mean daily minimum °C (°F)	21 (70)	21 (70)	22 (72)	23 (73)	25 (77)	25 (77)	25 (77)	25 (77)	25 (77)	24 (75)	23 (73)	22 (72)	23 (74)
Average precipitation mm (inches)	31 (1.2)	20 (0.8)	25 (1.0)	39 (1.5)	152 (6.0)	269 (10.6)	314 (12.4)	285 (11.2)	303 (11.9)	208 (8.2)	95 (3.7)	70 (2.8)	1,811 (71.3)
Average rainy days	9.5	7.1	9.0	11.3	21.0	25.7	28.1	26.5	27.3	24.6	16.5	12.1	218.7
Source: Meteoblue (Use with caution: this is modeled/calculated data, not measured locally.)

=== Barangays ===
Caluya is politically subdivided into 18 barangays. Each barangay consists of puroks and some have sitios.

PSGC	Barangay	Population			±% p.a.	
		2024		2010		
060605001	Alegria	5.8%	2,468	1,719	▴	2.55%
060605002	Bacong	1.5%	640	636	▴	0.04%
060605003	Banago	2.7%	1,155	1,123	▴	0.20%
060605004	Bonbon	1.5%	662	626	▴	0.39%
060605005	Dawis	1.8%	785	659	▴	1.22%
060605006	Dionela	0.7%	316	297	▴	0.43%
060605007	Harigue	7.7%	3,292	2,691	▴	1.41%
060605008	Hininga-an	3.1%	1,350	1,188	▴	0.89%
060605009	Imba	3.2%	1,385	1,050	▴	1.94%
060605010	Masanag	2.7%	1,169	1,044	▴	0.79%
060605011	Poblacion	4.3%	1,856	1,677	▴	0.71%
060605012	Sabang	2.0%	873	735	▴	1.20%
060605013	Salamento	2.6%	1,122	1,027	▴	0.62%
060605014	Semirara	29.0%	12,434	10,129	▴	1.44%
060605015	Sibato	2.7%	1,164	1,095	▴	0.43%
060605016	Sibay	2.1%	916	864	▴	0.41%
060605017	Sibolo	3.1%	1,323	1,143	▴	1.02%
060605018	Tinogboc	6.0%	2,586	2,343	▴	0.69%
	Total		42,895	30,046	▴	2.51%

== Demographics ==
Population census of Caluya
Year	Pop.	±% p.a.
1918	2,911	—
1939	3,947	+1.46%
1948	4,779	+2.15%
1960	5,993	+1.90%
1970	7,932	+2.84%
1975	8,870	+2.27%
1980	10,901	+4.21%
1990	16,243	+4.07%
1995	17,101	+0.97%
2000	20,049	+3.47%
2007	25,526	+3.39%
2010	30,046	+6.11%
2015	35,496	+3.23%
2020	38,908	+1.95%
2024	42,895	+2.37%
Source: Philippine Statistics Authority

In the 2024 census, Caluya had a population of 42,895 people. The population density was 320 inhabitants per square kilometre (830/sq mi).

=== Languages ===
People in Caluya speak the Caluyanon language followed by Kinaray-a, the predominant language of Antique mainland. Hiligaynon is also spoken and it is widely understood by the residents due to proximity to Iloilo.

== Economy ==
Poverty incidence of Caluya (%)

Source: Philippine Statistics Authority

== Education ==
The Caluya Schools District Office governs all educational institutions within the municipality. It oversees the management and operations of all private and public, from primary to secondary schools.

=== Primary and elementary schools ===
- Alegria Elementary School
- Bacong Elementary School
- Banago Elementary School
- Bonbon Elementary School
- Bunlao Elementary School (Ligaya Elementary School)
- Caluya Central School
- Dawis Elementary School
- Dionela Primary School
- Divine Word School of Semirara Island
- Harigue Elementary School
- Hininga-an Elementary School
- Imba Elementary School
- Lim Elementary School
- Masanag Elementary School
- Panagatan Elementary School
- Sabang I Elementary School
- Sabang II Elementary School
- Salamento Elementary School
- Semirara Adventist Academy
- Semirara Pastureland Christian Academy
- Semirara Elementary School
- Sibato Elementary School
- Sibay Elementary School
- Sibolo Elementary School
- Tinogboc Elementary School
- Villarises Elementary School

=== Secondary schools ===
- Caluya National High School
- Semirara National High School
- Sibay National High School
- Tinogboc National High School
