= Solaire Resort =

Resort in Parañaque, Philippines

Coordinates: 14.523166°N 120.981260°E

Solaire Resort & Casino

- Exterior of Solaire Resort Entertainment City
- Interactive map of Solaire Resort & Casino
- Location: Entertainment City, Tambo, Parañaque, Philippines; 1 Aseana Avenue
- Opened: March 16, 2013; 13 years ago
- No. of rooms: 800: Phase 1: 488; Phase 2: 312
- Gaming space: 18,500 m^{2} (199,000 sq ft)
- Notable restaurants: Food Court; Finestra; Yakumi; Red Lantern; Fresh; Waterside; Oasis; Kiwa; The Patisserie; Lucky Noodles; Solaire Food Bar & Grill
- Owner: Bloomberry Resorts and Hotels; Sureste Properties, Inc.
- Operating license holder: PAGCOR
- Website: https://www.solaireresort.com/

Solaire Resort (also known simply as Solaire) is a chain of integrated resorts in the Philippines. As of 2024, there are two properties: Solaire Resort Entertainment City in Parañaque and Solaire Resort North in Quezon City.

== Solaire Resort Entertainment City ==
=== History ===
Solaire Resort & Casino was the first development to break ground in PAGCOR's Entertainment City, an integrated resort envisioned by former PAGCOR Chairman Efraim Genuino for the Manila Bay area. The 120-hectare (300-acre) reclaimed area was designated as a special economic zone by the Philippine Economic Zone Authority.

The resort is run by Bloomberry Resorts Corporation, headed by Enrique K. Razón, Jr., chairman of the Manila-based company, International Container Terminal Services Incorporated. The project required an investment commitment of $1.2 billion pursuant to a casino license from PAGCOR. After Resorts World Manila was built in August 2009, the state-run Philippine Amusement and Gaming Corporation (PAGCOR) issued a provisional license to Bloomberry Resorts and Hotels Incorporated; the facility was launched as "Solaire Manila", and broke ground in July 2010. The hotel tower was topped out in June 2012 alongside a parking garage.

In October 2012, Solaire Manila was renamed "Solaire Resort & Casino" and Phase 1 was completed in the first quarter of 2013. Leading the official opening of Solaire Resort and Casino were President Benigno Aquino III, Bloomberry Resorts Corporation Chairman and CEO Enrique K. Razon Jr., Chairman of PAGCOR Cristino Naguiat Jr. and other guests, inaugurating the casino resort at 15:00 PST (GMT+8) on March 16, 2013–exactly 492 years after Ferdinand Magellan had arrived in the Philippines.

=== Development ===
The complex, covering a total of 8.3 hectares (21 acres), houses two 17-storey hotels. Bay Tower and Sky Tower have a total of 800 rooms, suites and villas. Solaire features a column-free grand ballroom which can accommodate a maximum of 1,300 guests. The Forum has eight function rooms and two boardrooms with audiovisual equipment. The complex includes 18,500 square metres (199,000 sq ft) gaming area containing 1,620 slot machines and 360 gaming tables. The complex includes convention facilities as well as leisure, live entertainment, dining and retail hubs. In retail, there is a mall called The Shoppes at Solaire operated by Ayala Land Inc. In 2014 there was an intention to stock premium brands. The project includes a second parking building, and "The Theatre at Solaire", with 1,740 seats and retail space of 60,000-hectare (150,000-acre).

Solaire Resort & Casino was managed under a five-year contract by American firm Global Gaming Asset Management, (which owned a 9 percent stake in the project) until September 2013. Solaire's COO Michael French was replaced by former Marina Bay Sands CEO Thomas Arasi.

An arena which is to be part of the casino complex, was planned to be among the proposed venues for the Philippine hosting bid for the 2019 FIBA World Cup.

Solaire Resort & Casino was designed by architect and designer Paul Steelman of Las Vegas-based Steelman Partners with interior design provided by Steelman Partners affiliate company DSAA (Dalton, Steelman, Arias & Associates) and the interior lighting design by affiliate shop12.

In 2024, Solaire Resort was bestowed the Forbes Travel Guide 5-Star Excellence Award for the 8th consecutive year.

== Solaire Resort North ==
Solaire Resort North

On March 19, 2024, Bloomberry announced the opening in late May of its second integrated resort Solaire Resort North, a US$1-billion investment covering 1.5 hectares and that “stands at 38 floors” at Vertis North in Quezon City. Designed by architecture firms Aedas and Casas+Architects, its interiors were crafted by the Habitus Design Group.

The second resort opened on May 25, 2024. The five-star integrated resort hotel's amenities include a lobby lounge, pillarless grand ballroom, banquet and conference rooms, 530 guest rooms, including deluxe rooms, premiere to diamond suites, L-shaped swimming pool with cabana cityscape views. Solaire has leisure facilities, health club, a first-in-the-country spa-salon, Solaire Boutique, PACE and children's water park. The 14 restaurants include Red Lantern, Yakumi, Finestra Italian Steakhouse, Fresh International Buffet, among others. Solaire has 10,000-hectare (25,000-acre) space for 4 luxury gaming levels which include Solaire Online and casino games like 160 tabletop game, 2,600 slot machines, VIP spaces, Baccarat-Mega Six, Pontoon Trilux Bonus and Blackjack.

== See also ==
- Gambling in Metro Manila
- List of integrated resorts
