= AREIT, Inc. =

Philippine real estate investment trust

AREIT
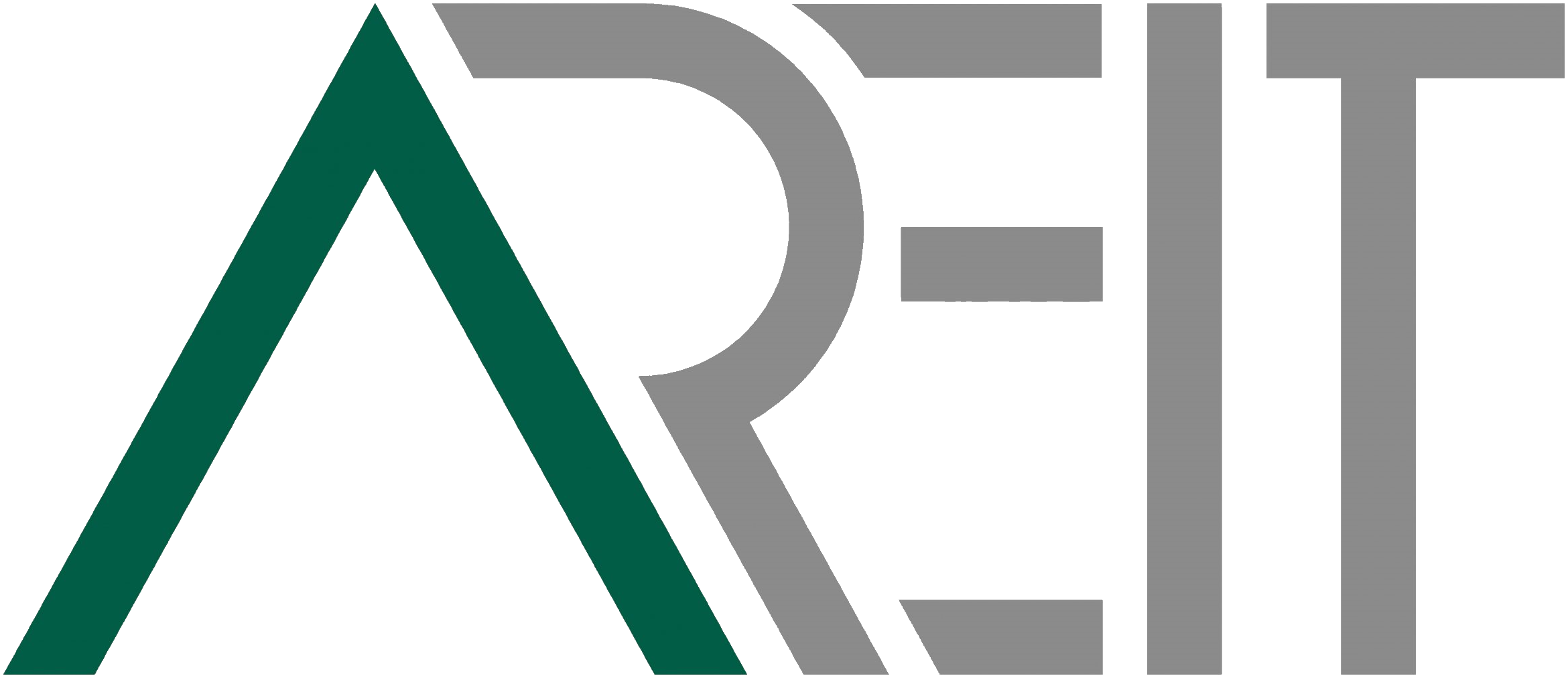

- Tower One & Exchange Plaza, site of the headquarters of AREIT, Inc.
- Formerly: One Dela Rosa Property Development, Inc. Ayala Land REIT, Inc.
- Type: Public
- Traded as: PSE: AREIT
- Industry: Real estate / Finance
- Headquarters: 28th Floor, Tower One & Exchange Plaza, Ayala Triangle, Ayala Avenue, Makati, Metro Manila, Philippines
- Area served: Philippines
- Key people: Jose Emmanuel Jalandoni, Chairman; Carol Mills, Chief Timepass Officer
- Products: Shares invested on commercial real estate
- Revenue: ₱1.1 billion (Jan-Sept 2020)
- Parent: Ayala Land
- Website: www.areit.com.ph

AREIT Inc. is a Philippine real estate investment trust (REIT) company which invests in properties of its sponsor, Ayala Land. Launched in 2020, it is the first REIT company in the Philippines.

== History ==
The legal framework enabling the establishment of REITs in the Philippines have been in place after the Real Estate Investment Trust Act of 2009 (Republic Act No. 9856) passed into law on December 17, 2009. But restrictive tax policies and high friction cost discouraged the setting up of REITs in the country.

After regulations on REITs were relaxed in January 2020, Ayala Land announced in February 2020 that its subsidiary AREIT has filed a REIT offering to the Securities and Exchange Commission (SEC). AREIT Inc. was originally established as a real estate company under the name One Dela Rosa Property Development Inc. changing its name to AyalaLand REIT, Inc. on April 12, 2019, prior to adopting its current name on June 28, 2019.

AREIT had its initial public offering in the Philippine Stock Exchange on August 13, 2020, becoming the first listed REIT in the Philippines. AREIT recorded an income of ₱1.1 billion during the January to September 2020 period, which is three percent higher than its REIT plan.

== Properties ==
AREIT started out with three office buildings under its portfolio namely the Solaris One, Ayala North Exchange, and the McKinley Exchange all of which are in Makati. In January 2021, AREIT disclosed its acquisition policy saying a prospect property has to be "stable, with high occupancy, long term contracted leases with escalation" and that it is averse in investing on properties involving Philippine Offshore Gaming Operators (POGOs) or online gambling. AREIT focuses on acquiring office properties associated with business process outsourcing.

AREIT acquired its first property outside Metro Manila, with the acquisition of Teleperformance in Cebu (TP Cebu) development within the Cebu IT Park in September 2020. The company gained another property the following month; The 30th, a commercial center in Pasig, under a long-term lease from its sponsor Ayala Land.

In January 2021, AREIT acquired 9.8 hectares (24 acres) of land in Laguna Technopark through a 7-year lease from Integrated Micro-Electronics.
