= Mining in the Philippines =

Mining in the Philippines makes up 0.7% of the Philippine GDP. Natural resources are owned by the state in the Philippines. Open-pit mining is controversial in the Philippines; the practice was banned in 2017, but the ban was lifted in 2021. Mining has caused crop failures, health issues in indigenous groups, and health issues to child laborers.

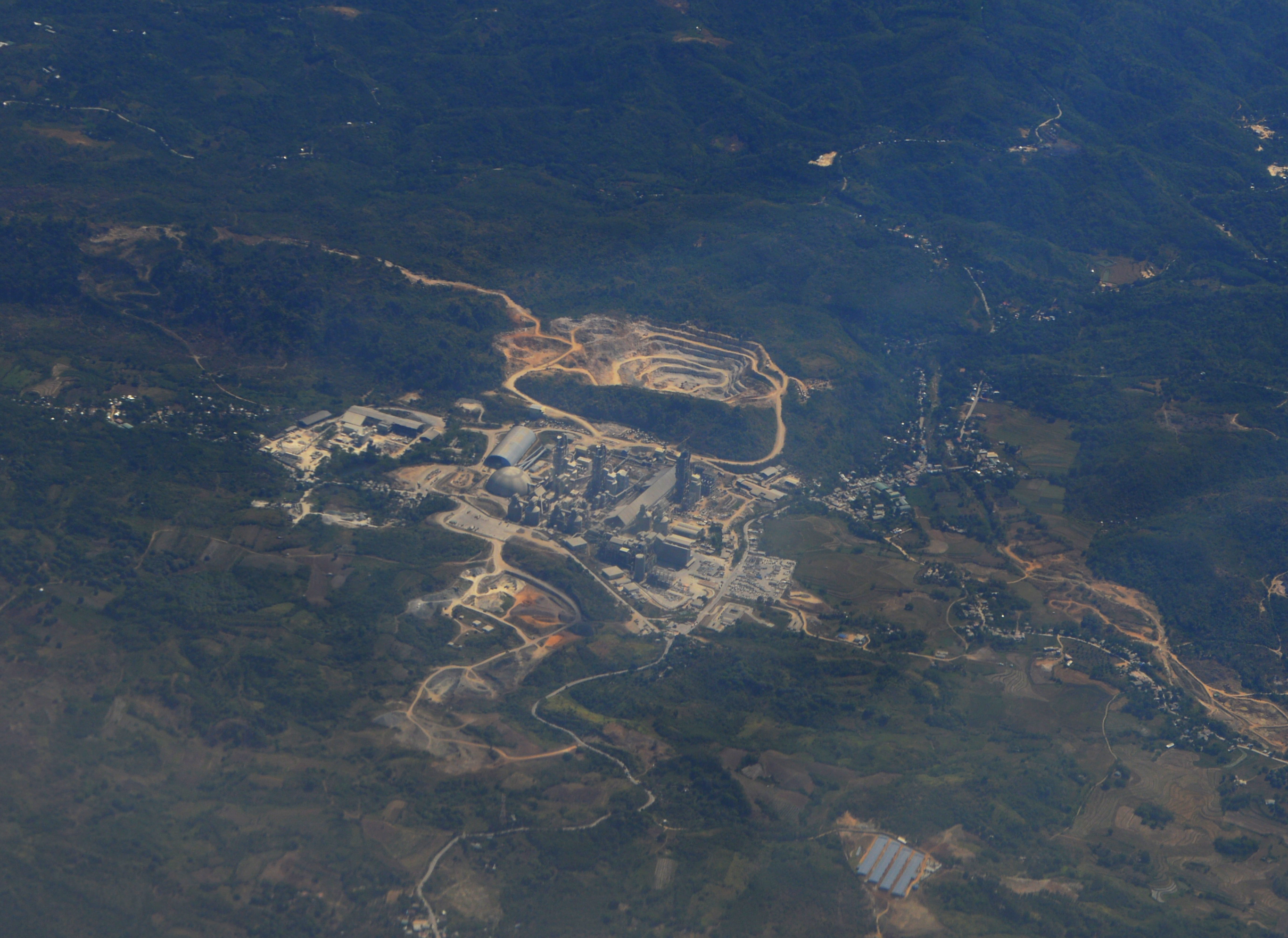
A cement quarry and processing plant of Eagle Cement Corporation in Barangay Akle, San Ildefonso, Bulacan. Photo taken aboard a Cebu Pacific flight to Cauayan, Isabela

== Background ==
The Philippines has copper, gold, nickel, aluminum, and chromite estimated to be worth around $1 trillion. Of the 30 million hectares in the country, 9 million hectares are known to have mineral deposits. In 2022, the Philippines produced 360,000 metric tons of nickel, which was 11% of global production. In 2023, mining was 0.70% of the Philippines's GDP.

Natural resources are owned by the state in the Philippines, which gives the state full control and supervision over any exploration or development of those resources. Companies who wish to extract resources are often required to gain a social license to operate; to get the license the company has to address the social risks and how they plan to mitigate them.

== History ==
Before foreign peoples entered the Philippines, Filipinos mined rare metals for trade and show. The metals of the Philippines attracted Spain to colonize the islands. The Spanish set up the Remigio Copper Mines company in 1842, which mined in Antique. The United States also set up a mining company, the Benguet Consolidated Mining Corporation, in 1909 to mine gold.

Dinagat Island was declared a mineral reservation in 1939. The Philippines first modern mining policy was the Mineral Resources Development Decree of 1974, which was a Presidential Decree by President Ferdinand Marcos.

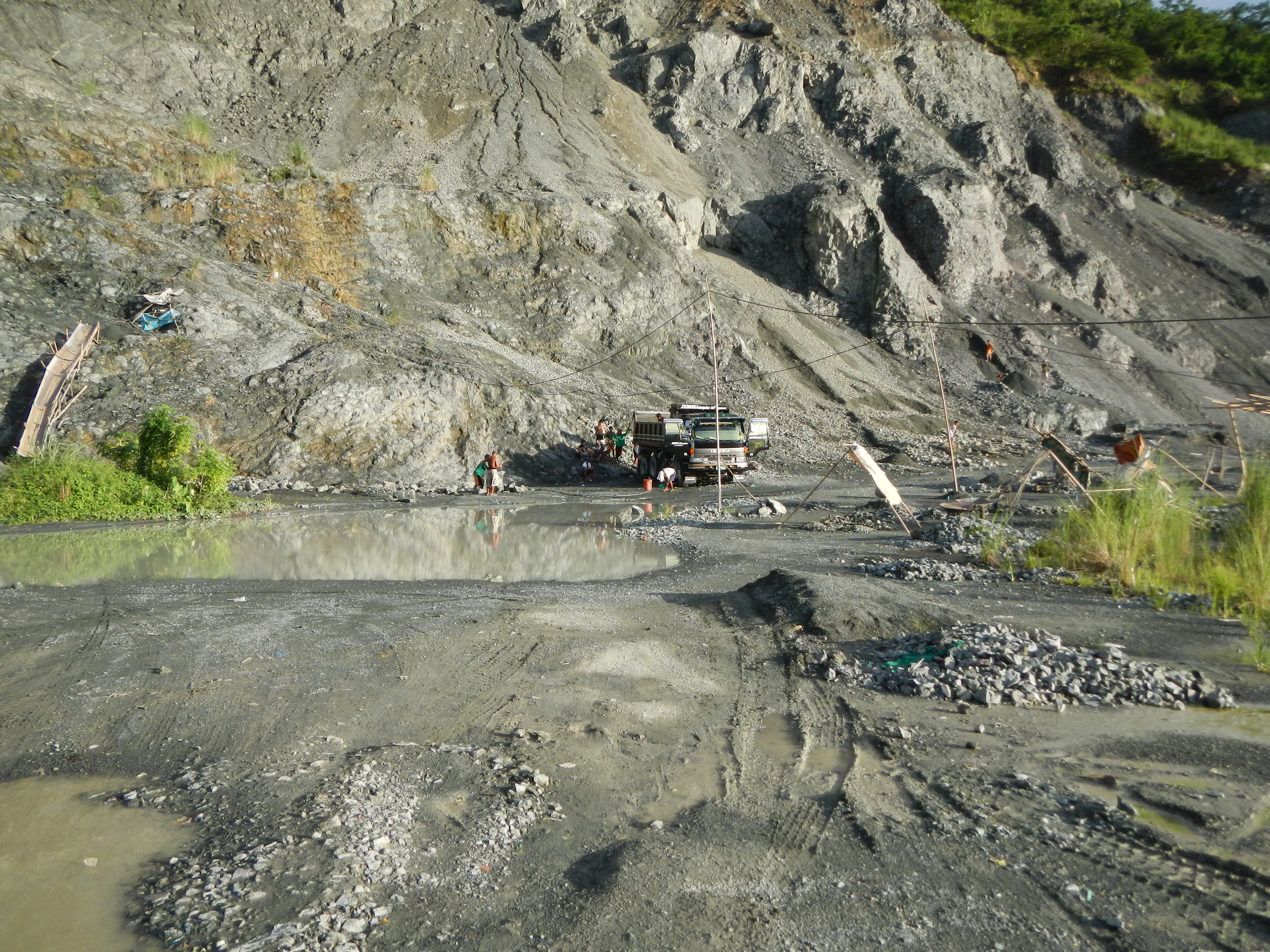
A quarry, which is a type of open-pit mine, in Rodriguez, Rizal.

In 2015, the Philippines banned compressor mining. President Rodrigo Duterte enacted a ban on open-pit mining in 2017. A Philippine court in South Cotabato upheld the ban in a 31-page ruling, which stated that the ban was in line with higher laws, alongside the Philippine constitution. Judge Vicente Peña, who ruled on the case, also noted the ban was part of a "global trend".

In 2021, President Duterte enacted an executive order to end a nine-year-moratorium on the granting of new mining permits. The Department of Environment and Natural Resources reversed a ban on open-pit metal mining in the same year.

== Criticism ==
Open-pit mining has destroyed forests and watersheds. Nickel open-pit mines have also caused crop failures due to it stripping away nutrients which reside in topsoil and damaging soil fertility.

The Philippine government has failed to consult indigenous groups, such as the Pala’wan people, before setting up nickel mines. The mines have caused deforestation and health problems. Health problems caused by the mines include asthma, coughs, respiratory issues, skin diseases, and eye, throat and skin irritation. Nearby freshwater sources have also reportedly turned a “reddish-brown” color. One Pala’wan community member claimed that the Pala’wan's exclusion from consultation on mining projects was because of bribes.

Children in the Philippines work in unstable mines that could collapse. In interviews of child miners in Bicol the children expressed fear of climbing down shafts and expressed concerns about the health effects of their work, which include back pain, skin infections, and muscle spasms; the symptoms are consistent with mercury poisoning. The carrying of heavy items causes spinal damage to children.

To get gold underwater, miners dived underwater in a process known as compressor mining. Divers got their air from a diesel compressor. Miners who use the method risk drowning because of lack of oxygen or mudslides, getting the bends from nitrogen bubbles, and an increased change of lung cancer due to being exposed to carbon monoxide. Compressor mining is banned in the Philippines.
