= Security Bank =

Bank in the Philippines

Security Bank Corporation
- Trade name: PSE: SECB
- Formerly: Security Bank and Trust Company
- Type: Universal Bank
- Industry: Banking, financial services
- Founded: June 18, 1951; 75 years ago
- Headquarters: Makati, Philippines
- Number of locations: A total network of 313 branches and 787 ATMs (As of 2021)
- Area served: Philippines
- Key people: Directors: Frederick Y. Dy (Chairman Emeritus); Cirilo P. Noel (Chairman); Diana P. Aguilar; Daniel S. Dy; Hiroshi Masaki; Alfonso L. Salcedo, Jr.; Takashi Takeuchi; Victor Lee Meng Teck (President and CEO); Independent directors: Gerard H. Brimo, Enrico S. Kang, Atty. Jose Perpetuo M. Lotilla, Napoleon L. Nazareno, and Joel Raymond R. Ayson; Officers; Joel Raymond R. Ayson (Corporate Secretary); Leslie Y. Cham (EVP and Branch Banking Group Head); Colin Dinn (EVP and Enterprise and Technology Head); Joselito E. Mape (EVP and Chief Administrative Officer); Eduardo M. Olbes (EVP and Chief Financial Officer); Raul Martin A. Pedro (EVP and Chief Financial Officer); Charles M. Rodriguez (EVP and Wholesale Banking Group Head); Takashi Takeuchi (EVP and Alliance Segment Head); Ma. Cristina A. Tingson (EVP and Retail Banking Segment Head); Anna Christina M. Chinjen (SVP and Chief Compliance Officer); Gina S. Go (SVP and Chief Risk Officer); Anton Khlon (SVP and Chief Information Officer); Grace S. Ayson (VP and Assistant Corporate Secretary)
- Products: Banking and financial products
- Operating income: ▼ ₱36.811 billion (2021)
- Net income: ▼ ₱6.917 billion (2021)
- Total assets: ▲ ₱699.6 billion (2021)
- Total equity: ▲ ₱125.1 billion (2021)
- Owner: Shareholding Structure: MUFG Bank (20.00%); Frederick Y. Dy (19.39%); Public (23.99%); Daniel S. Dy (12.96%); Others (23.66%)
- Number of employees: 7,108 (2021)
- Parent: Philippines Asset Management Corporation
- Subsidiaries: List of Subsidiaries: SB Finance Company, Inc. (49.7%); SB Capital Investment Corporation (100%); SB Cards Corporation (100%); SB Finance and Leasing Inc. (100%)
- Website: www.securitybank.com

Security Bank Corporation (SBC, simplified Chinese: 信安银行; traditional Chinese: 信安銀行; pinyin: Xìn'ān Yínháng; Pe̍h-ōe-jī: Sìn-an Gûn-hâng) is a universal bank in the Philippines. It was established on June 18, 1951, as Security Bank and Trust Company and was the first private and Filipino-controlled bank of the post-World War II period.

Security Bank was publicly listed with the Philippine Stock Exchange in 1995 (PSE: SECB). The Bank's major businesses include retail, commercial and corporate banking, and financial markets. It offers a wide range of services, including financing and leasing, foreign exchange and stock brokerage, investment banking, and asset management through its subsidiaries.

In 2014, Security Bank embarked on a rebranding campaign called "BetterBanking" to further strengthen market appreciation of its retail banking business, which complements its wholesale banking business.

In January 2016, MUFG (formerly, The Bank of Tokyo-Mitsubishi UFJ), Japan's largest bank, acquired a 20% minority stake of Security Bank for a deal worth ₱36.9 billion.

As of 2021, Security Bank has a total network of 313 branches and 787 ATMs nationwide.

== History ==
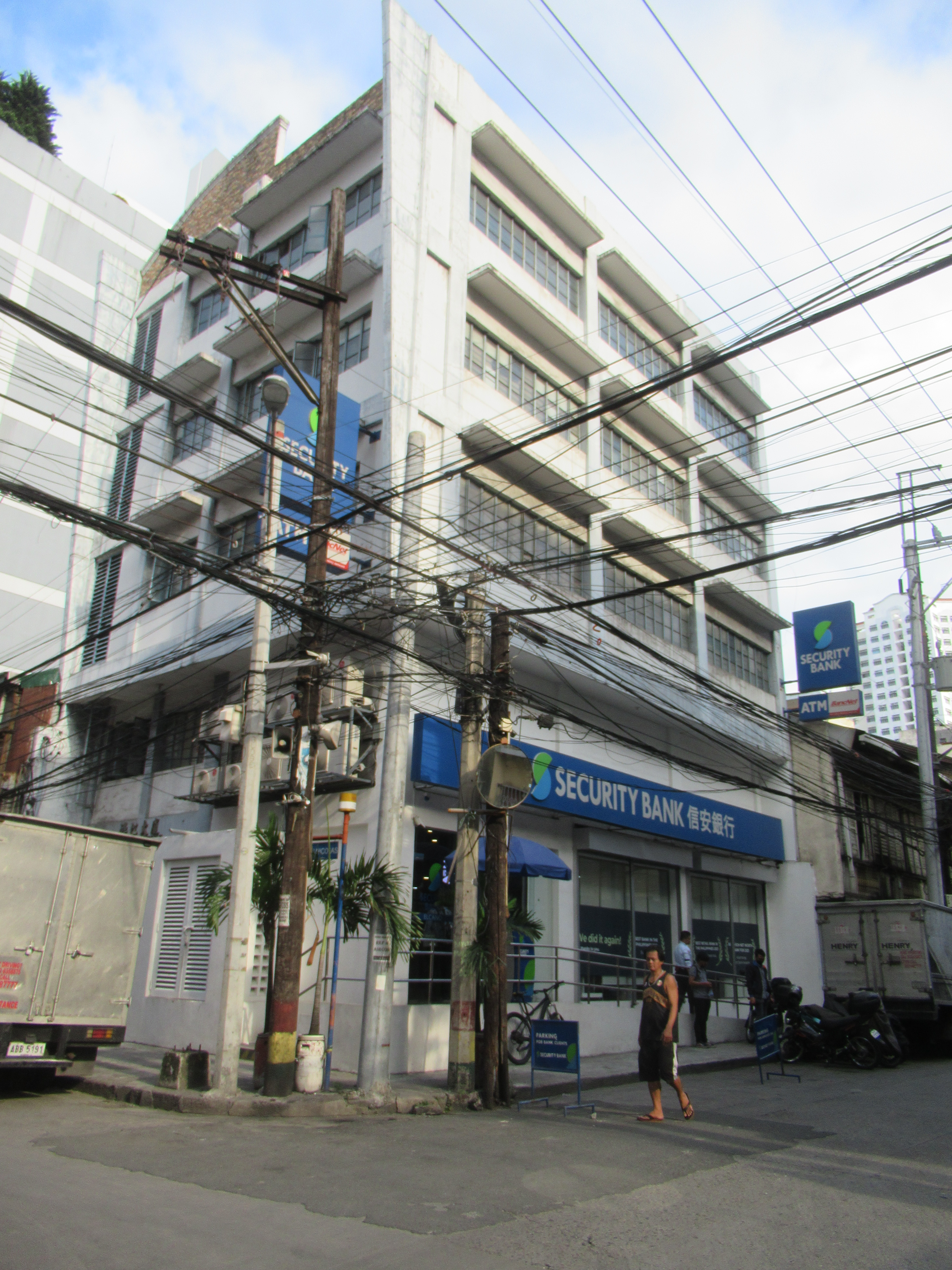
A Security Bank branch in Manila

=== Early history ===
Security Bank was established on June 18, 1951, as Security Bank and Trust Company (SBTC) in Manila, Philippines. At the time, SBTC was the first privately owned, Filipino-controlled bank of the post-World War II era. The bank's head office was first located in the Don Roman Santos Building on Plaza Goiti, moving to Escolta in 1954. At the time, Security Bank was so aggressive in opening branches that at one point during the 1950s, it had more branches in Metro Manila than any other local bank.

Beginning in the 1960s, Security Bank started expanding outside Metro Manila as well, with the opening of its first provincial branch in Angeles City. Within the decade, the bank started a rapid expansion in the provinces. It was also in the 1960s that Security Bank led a consortium of local and foreign companies that lent US$62 million to the Lopez family to fund their acquisition of Meralco, the first of its kind in Philippine banking history.

In the 1970s, Security Bank issued its first credit card, introducing the Philippines to Diners Club (until Security Bank sold Diners Club's exclusive rights in the Philippines to its rival, BDO Unibank in 2016). It also marked the start of the bank's trust offerings, many of which were deemed innovative, and still survive today as pre-need and common-trust plans, of which they are descended from Security Bank's offerings at the time. Towards the end of the 1970s, the bank was granted permission to operate a foreign currency division by the Bangko Sentral ng Pilipinas. It widened its investment services portfolio in the 1980s, even when the Philippines was thrown into a deepening political crisis. Like other major banks, the Security Bank survived.

The 1990s brought in new owners led by Frederick Y. Dy. On April 26, 1994, the bank was issued a universal banking license by the BSP. With the issuance of its universal banking license, the legal name of Security Bank changed to the present-day Security Bank Corporation. The bank also moved to its new headquarters along Ayala Avenue in Makati. SBC's stock was also formally listed on the Philippine Stock Exchange on June 8, 1995, with a 1.5 billion-peso initial public offering. The Zamora family since 1987, still own stocks in Security Bank after mining magnate Manny Zamora bought Security Bank from Rolando Gapud.

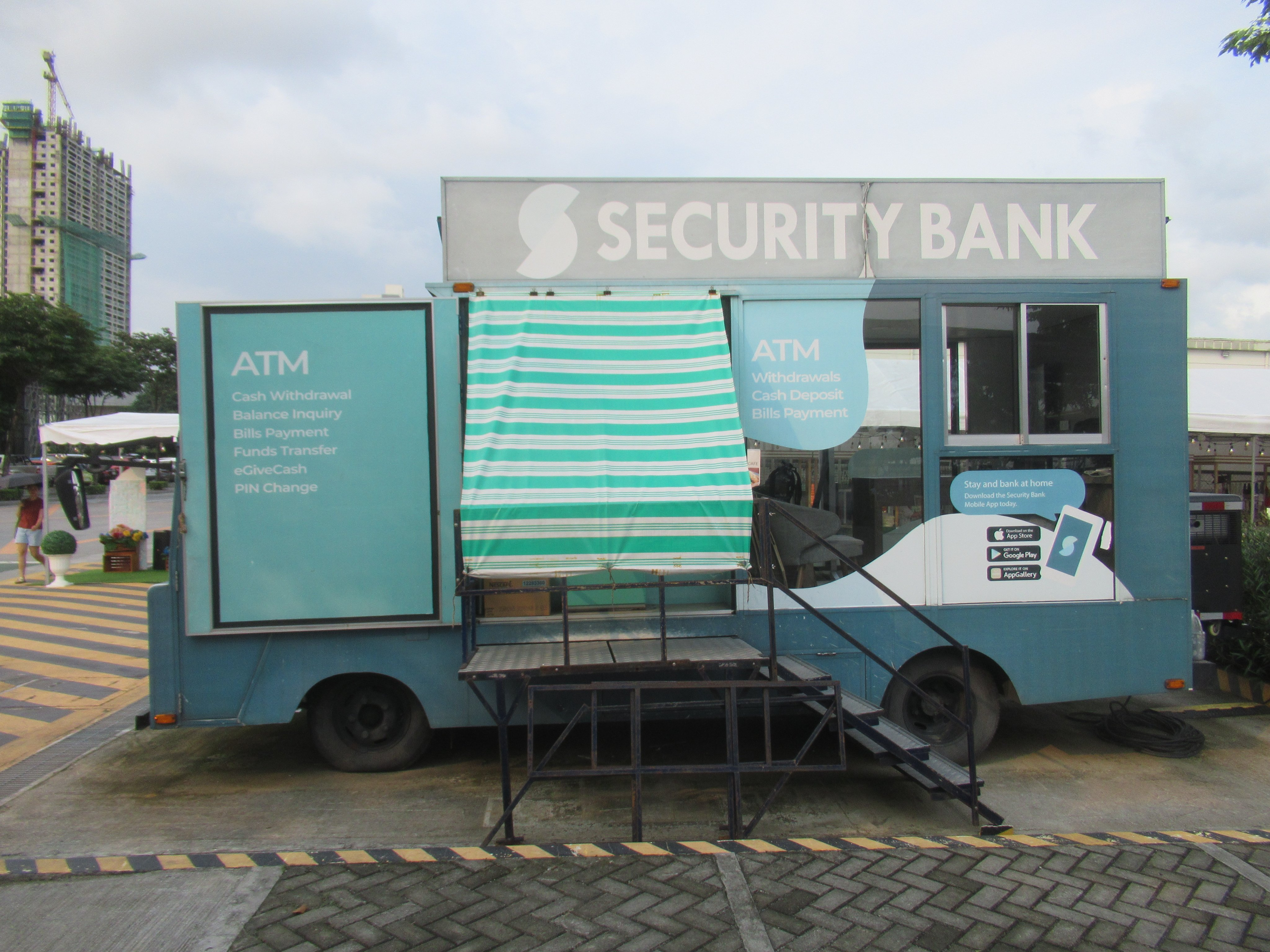
Automated teller machine within a van in Arcovia City

=== 2000–present ===
In 2016, the bank partnered with Japan's largest bank The Bank of Tokyo-Mitsubishi UFJ, Ltd. (BTMU) to bolster its capital and enhance their global capabilities. BTMU is now the second largest shareholder of Security Bank and is now an equity affiliate of BTMU. The partnership with Japan’s largest bank provided Security Bank with additional capital (₱36.9 billion from MUFG), long-term funding, and business collaboration opportunities that support the acceleration of the Bank’s long-term growth strategy including expansion of branch network and increasing penetration of the retail market.

As of December 31, 2018, Security Bank is the 6th largest in total assets among private domestic universal banks in the country, with total assets of ₱767 billion; 6th largest in loans, with loan portfolio of ₱416 billion, and 5th largest in capital, with capital of ₱109 billion.

== Ownership ==
Top 10 stockholders as of April 30, 2023:
No.	Stockholder's Name	% to Total Common Shares
1	PCD Nominee Corporation	32.08%
2	Eastwest Bank of the Philippines (Gotianun), Ltd.	20.00%
3	PCD Nominee Corporation (Non-Filipino) MUFJ Group of Japan	19.29%
4	Asiasec Equities, Inc.	16.01%
5	Manuel B. Zamora Jr. (through Frederick Y. Dy)	4.16%
6	Frederick Y. Dy (and/or Evelyn Dy)	3.62%
7	Social Security System (SSS)	2.65%
8	Goodwoord Resources Development Inc.	0.83%
9	James JK Hung	0.32%
10	SB Equities, Inc.	0.25%

== See also ==
- BancNet
- List of banks in the Philippines
