= Philippine Stock Exchange =

National stock exchange of the Philippines

- Pamilihang Sapi ng Pilipinas

- The new Philippine Stock Exchange headquarters (center) in Bonifacio Global City, Taguig
- Type: Stock exchange
- Location: Philippine Stock Exchange Tower; 5th Avenue cor. 28th Street, Bonifacio Global City, Taguig, Metro Manila, Philippines
- Founded: August 8, 1927 (as the Manila Stock Exchange); December 23, 1992 (as the Philippine Stock Exchange)
- Owner: The Philippine Stock Exchange, Inc.
- Key people: José T. Pardo (Chairman); Ramon S. Monzon (President & CEO)
- Currency: Philippine peso (₱)
- No. of listings: 287 (2025)
- Market cap: ₱ 13.65 trillion (2025); $ 232.379 billion (2025)
- Indices: PSEi PSE All Shares Index; PSE Financials Index; PSE Holding Firms Index; PSE Services Index; PSE Industrial Index; PSE Property Index; PSE Mining & Oil Index; PSE Total Return Index; PSE Dividend Yield Index PSE MidCap Index
- Website: www.pse.com.ph

The Philippine Stock Exchange (Filipino: Pamilihang Sapi ng Pilipinas) is the national stock exchange of the Philippines. The exchange was created in 1992 from the merger of the Manila Stock Exchange and the Makati Stock Exchange. Including previous forms, the exchange has been in operation since 1927. The PSE's headquarters is located at the Philippine Stock Exchange Tower, located along the One Bonifacio High Street complex in Bonifacio Global City.

The PSE is currently owned and managed by The Philippine Stock Exchange, Inc., a company that is also listed on the exchange (PSE: PSE). It is responsible for managing the entire stock exchange, and, as on 6 June 2026, has a total of 283 listed companies. The main index for the PSE is the PSE Composite Index (PSEi) composed of thirty (30) listed companies. The selection of companies in the PSEi is based on a specific set of criteria ranging from total capitalization to minimum number of stockholders upon its planned listing. There are also six additional sector-based indices. The PSE is overseen by a 15-member board of directors, co-chaired by José T. Pardo and José E. Divina.

== History ==
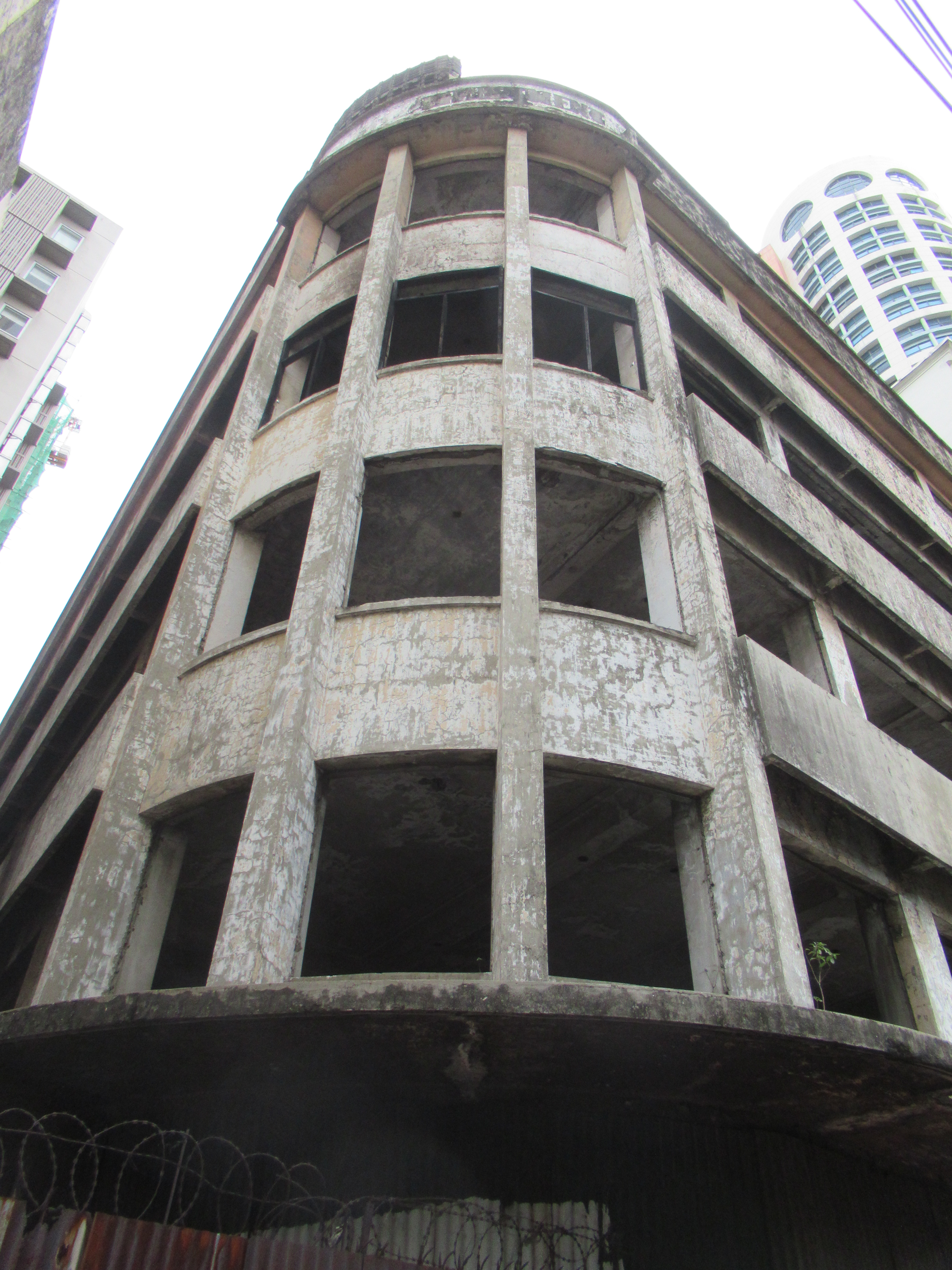
1927 Old Manila Stock Exchange (Calypso) Building, Binondo (2023)

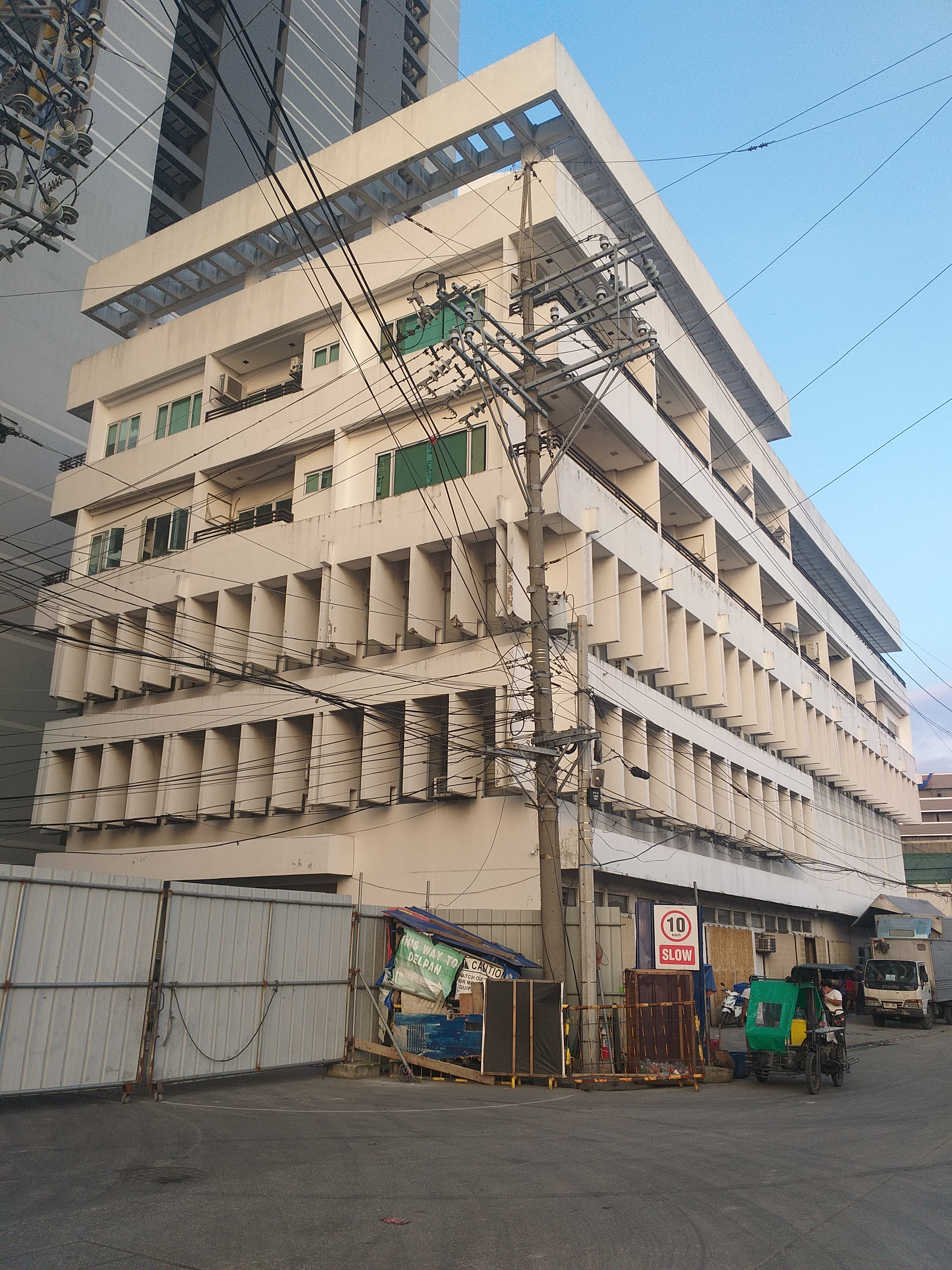
Building which hosted the defunct Manila Stock Exchange in Binondo.

The Ground Level of the New Headquarters of the Philippine Stock Exchange in Bonifacio Global City.

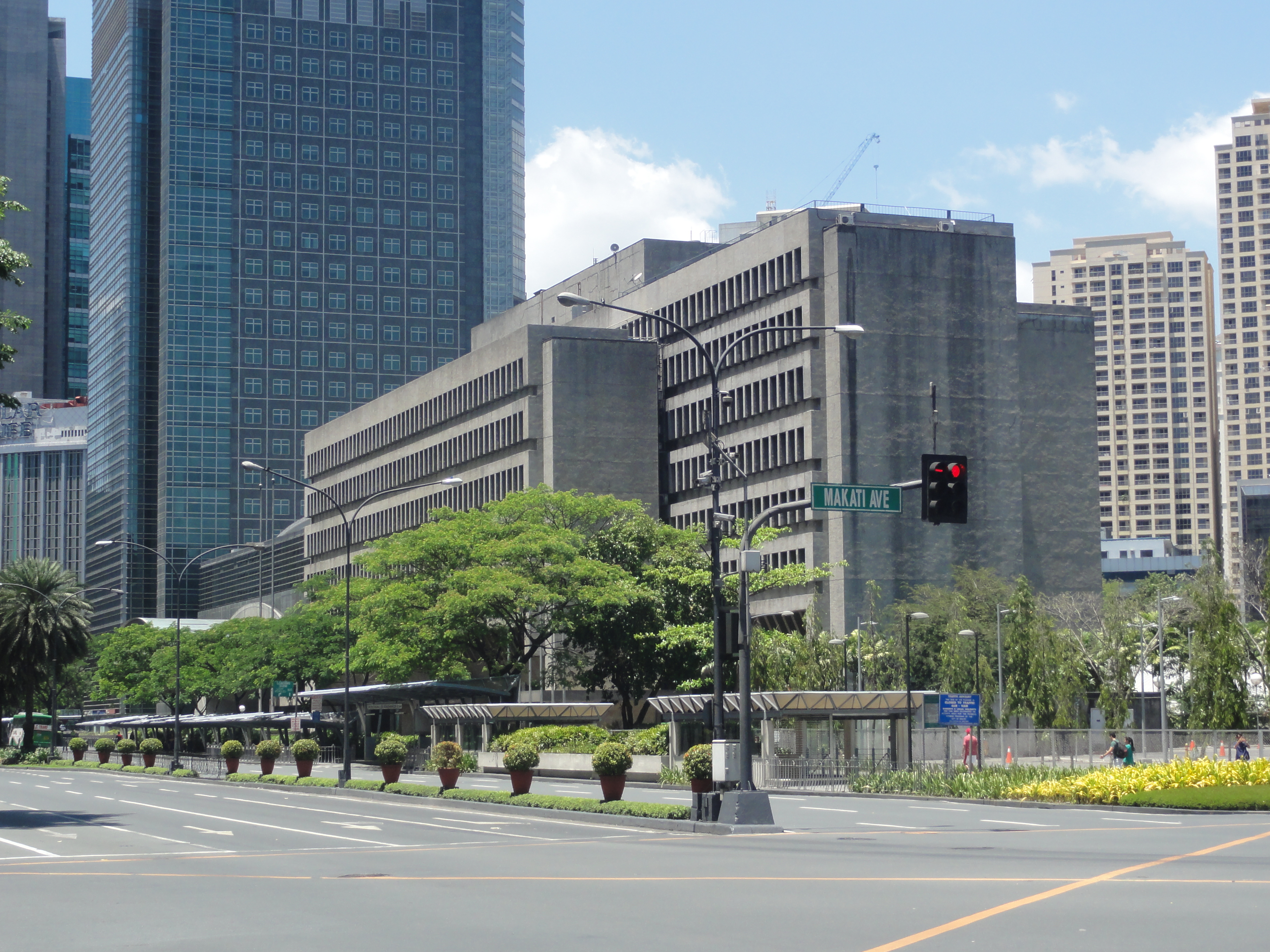
The Old Headquarters and Trading floor of the PSEi and the Makati Stock Exchange in Ayala Tower One in the Makati Central Business District.

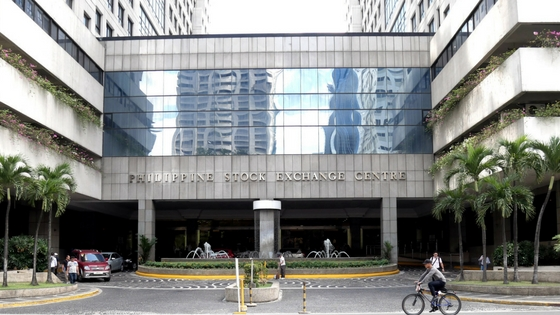
Philippine Stock Exchange Center is located on Exchange Road, Ortigas Center, Pasig.

On February 3, 1936, the Securities and Exchange Commission announced that it had "relinquished control of the Manila Stock Exchange."

The Philippine Stock Exchange was formed on December 23, 1995, from the merger of the Manila Stock Exchange (MSE) (established on August 12, 1927, based on Muelle de la Industria, Binondo, Manila) and the Makati Stock Exchange (MkSE) (established on May 15, 1963, based in the Makati Central Business District, within Ayala Tower One). Both exchanges traded the same stocks of the same companies.

In June 1998, the Securities and Exchange Commission (SEC) granted the PSE a "Self-Regulatory Organization" (SRO) status, which meant that the bourse can implement its own rules and establish penalties on erring trading participants (TPs) and listed companies.

In 2001, the PSE was transformed from a non-profit, non-stock, member-governed organization into a shareholder-based, revenue-earning corporation headed by a president and a board of directors and on December 15, 2003, listed its own shares on the exchange (traded under the ticker symbol PSE).

On March 28, 2022, The Philippine Stock Exchange launched the PSE Thematic Index Series, with two new indices, namely PSE Dividend Yield Index, and PSE MidCap Index.

== Record values ==
Category	All-Time Highs	
Closing	9,058.62	Monday, January 29, 2018
Intraday	9,078.37	Monday, January 29, 2018

== Business ==
On January 4, 1993, the former Manila Stock Exchange started the computerization of its operations using the Stratus Trading System (STS) with a company called Equicom. On June 15, the former Makati Stock Exchange adopted the MakTrade trading system. Both systems were linked on March 25, 1994, to produce a One Price-One Market exchange. Two years later, on November 13, 1995, the implementation of the Unified Trading System (UTS) allowed the use of a single-order-book system on a MakTrade software where all the orders are posted and matched in one computer. They have nearly 10,000 employees.

In October 2004, the Securities Clearing Corporation of the Philippines (SCCP), a clearing and settlement agency for depository eligible trades, became a wholly owned subsidiary of the PSE. The SCCP acts as the settlement coordinator and risk manager for broker transactions as well as administrator of the trade guaranty fund.

In 2005, the PSE adopted an online daily disclosure system (ODiSy) to improve the transparency of listed companies and ensure full, fair, timely and accurate disclosure of material information from all listed companies. The ODiSy provides a 24/7 online system access for the submission of all types of disclosures.

On July 26, 2010, the PSE launched its new trading system, PSEtrade, which replaced the MakTrade system. The system was acquired from the New York Stock Exchange.

On June 22, 2015, the PSE launch its new trading system, the PSEtrade XTS, which will replace the PSEtrade system acquired from the New York Stock Exchange. The new trading system will be acquired from the NASDAQ.

In 2016, The Marquee Awards of Alpha Southeast Asia magazine recognized PSE as the Best Stock Market in Southeast Asia for the year 2015. The Alpha Southeast Asia, Named PSE Again as the Best Stock Market in Southeast Asia in 2017, for 4 Times in 5 Years.

In 2019, The PSE has introduced a new index that will help track the overall returns of the main index, The Total Return Index (PSEi TRI), as part of the efforts to create a broader investor base for the market.

=== Record highs ===
On March 2, 2012, the PSE Composite hits 5,000 mark the highest record close. Furthermore, on December 12, 2012, almost ten months after, it neared the 5,800 mark closing in 6,000 near the end of the year.

On January 7, 2013, the PSE Composite gets to all-time record at 6,000 mark. In March it again broke another record by ending the trading day at 6,847.47 after Fitch Group upgraded the Philippines for the first time to investment grade status . On May 10, 2013, it achieved its 29th record close for the year closing at 7,262.38, surpassing the previous record of 7,215.35 on May 3. On May 15, 2013, the PSEi hit its 30th all-time high of 7403.65 and ending the day at 7,392.2. However, the tapering by the Federal Reserves in the United States caused the PSEi to end at 5,889.83.

On April 6, 2015, the PSE Composite the 8,000 mark and closes on another record by ending the trading day at 8,053.74. In 4 days it broke another record by ending the trading day at 8,127.48.

On January 26, 2018, PSEi breached through 9000 for the first time, ending at 9,041.20, up by 42.03 points, or 0.47%.

== Current trading floors ==
Trading on the PSE pre-opens at 9:00 A.M.; opens at 9:30 A.M.; is in recess between 12:00 and 1:00 P.M.; pre-closes at 3:15 P.M.; in run-off from 3:20 P.M.; and closes at 3:30 P.M.

The unified trading floor's final location was the Philippine Stock Exchange Tower (PSE Tower), the new headquarters of the PSEi, located in One Bonifacio High Street, Bonifacio Global City, replacing the two trading floors in Metro Manila: one at its headquarters at the PSE Plaza Ayala Triangle, Ayala Tower One in the Makati Central Business District (Makati Stock Exchange); and one at the Philippine Stock Exchange Centre (Tektite Towers), Ortigas Center in Pasig (Manila Stock Exchange).

However, the Philippine Stock Exchange permanently closed its trading floor in Bonifacio Global City on Friday, June 24, 2022; it would start floor-less trading the following Monday, June 27, 2022. PSE made the decision following the COVID-19 lockdowns in 2020 and 2021; according to the organization, the pandemic and lockdowns proved that off-site transactions can be made, thus making the existence of a trading floor moot. PSE also said that the closure of the trading floor was done to embrace digitalization.

== Indices and components ==
The PSE has eight constituent indices:

- PSE All Shares Index (ALL)
- PSE Composite Index (PSEi)
- PSE Dividend Yield Index (PSE DivY)
- PSE MidCap Index (PSE MidCap)
- PSE Financials Index (FIN)
- PSE Holding Firms Index (HDG)
- PSE Industrial Index (IND)
- PSE Mining and Oil Index (M-O)
- PSE Property Index (PRO)
- PSE Services Index (SVC)
- PSE Total Returns Index (TRI)
- PSE SME Sector (SME)

The PSEi is the main index of the PSE, while the All Shares Index is the broader index of the exchange. The remaining six indices are sector indices based on a company's main source of revenue. Although listed in an index, companies are listed on the PSE under the First Board, Second Board or the Small and Medium Enterprises Board based on market capitalization.

As of March 28, 2022, the Philippine Stock Exchange has 281 listed companies with a total market capitalization of ₱18.25 trillion. There are 126 active trading participants registered at the PSE. The PSE also offers Exchange Traded Funds through the First Metro Philippine Equity Exchange Traded Fund, Inc., and also has various REIT companies listed in the exchange's property index.

== See also ==
- List of ASEAN stock exchanges by market capitalization
- Philippine Dealing Exchange
- List of stock exchange trading hours
