= Equitable PCI Bank =

Bank in the Philippines

Equitable PCI Bank, Inc.
- Type: Public (PSE: EPCI)
- Industry: Finance and Insurance
- Predecessor: Equitable Bank; PCI Bank
- Founded: July 8, 1938; 88 years ago as PCI Bank; June 17, 1950; 76 years ago as Equitable Bank; May 1999; 27 years ago as Equitable PCI Bank
- Defunct: May 31, 2007; 19 years ago
- Fate: Merged into Banco de Oro in 2007 and assumed the Banco de Oro name
- Successor: BDO
- Headquarters: 7899 Makati Avenue, Makati, Philippines
- Key people: Go Kim Pah (founder, Equitable Banking Corporation); Eduardo Coseteng (許友超) (Co-founder, Equitable Banking Corporation); Antonio L. Go (former Chairman); Rene J. Buenaventura (former President and CEO); Eugenio Lopez Jr. (Chairman, PCIBank); John Gokongwei Jr. (Vice Chairman, PCIBank); Rafael B. Buenaventura, (President and CEO, PCIBank)
- Products: Financial services
- Net income: P2.65 billion PHP (2005)
- Number of employees: unknown
- Website: https://web.archive.org/web/20070927212448/http://www.equitablepcib.com/

Equitable PCI Bank, Inc. (PSE: EPCI) was one of the largest banks in the Philippines, being the third-largest bank in terms of assets at the time prior to its merger. It was the largest bank before it was overtaken by Metrobank in 1995. It is the result of the merger of Equitable Banking Corporation and Philippine Commercial International Bank or PCIBank. It was known for a wide range of services from savings to insurance and, through its wholly owned subsidiary Equitable Card Network (ECN), was the largest Philippine credit card issuer. The bank merged with Banco de Oro Universal Bank in early 2007, and is now branded as BDO as its new identity as part of the new Banco de Oro Unibank, Inc.

== Equitable PCI Bank history ==
Equitable PCI Bank logo with tagline prior to merger with BDO

The shares of the Lopez and Gokongwei families were sold to the SSS and GSIS, which acquired 78% of PCI Bank shares that were bought by the Go-Led Equitable Banking Corporation. They merged in 1999 and were approved by the Bangko Sentral and other agencies that had created the third largest Philippine bank, with Equitable as the survivor of the merger. The name Equitable PCI Bank was adopted. Head offices at the former PCI Bank Towers I and II were renamed to the Equitable PCI Bank Towers I and II, and the Equitable Banking Corporation Binondo Center and at the Equitable Banking Corporation Tower, also in Makati.

The bank played an important role in the impeachment trial of President Joseph Estrada. The bank produced fifteen witnesses (along with nine banks: Citibank, Philippine Savings Bank, Bank of the Philippine Islands, Security Bank, Land Bank of the Philippines, Urban Bank, Export and Industry Bank, Asia United Bank and Keppel Bank) to prove that the 'Jose Velarde' account was owned by Estrada (which also invested on the merger of the Equitable Banking Corporation and then the Lopez-Gokongwei led Philippine Commercial International Bank), with senior vice president Clarissa Ocampo in particular providing testimony that connected Estrada to the account.

On August 5, 2005, SM Investments and Banco de Oro Universal Bank announced that they have purchased a 24.76% stake of Equitable PCI from the Go family (Equitable Banking Corporation), the family that founded the bank, along with a 10% stake in Equitable CardNetwork. Subsequent acquisitions by Banco de Oro enabled it to gain a 34% share in the bank.

On January 6, 2006, Banco de Oro Universal Bank submitted a merger offer to the bank, with Banco de Oro as the surviving entity. Under the proposed offer, Banco de Oro would swap 1.6 of its shares for every 1 share of Equitable-PCI (The merger occurred, but BDO Shareholders were to swap 1.8 BDO shares for every EPCI share). As a second option, Banco de Oro also offered to base the swap ratio on the book values of both banks to be assessed by an independent accounting firm using international accounting standards. With the success of this merger, Banco de Oro became the second largest bank, with assets of P613 billion, after the current industry leader, Metropolitan Bank and Trust Company, with assets of more than P641.5 billion. The merger demoted the Bank of the Philippine Islands to third place, with P582 billion in assets. BDO has since surpassed Metrobank in asset, loan and deposit sizes to become the largest lender in the Philippines.

=== Equitable Bank history ===
On June 17, 1950, Equitable Banking Corporation was founded by Go Kim Pah as the first commercial bank in the Philippines, licensed by the newly formed Central Bank of the Philippines (now Bangko Sentral ng Pilipinas). Other commercial banks like Bank of the Philippine Islands were formed and licensed during the Spanish or American regimes. However, it was not until 1955 that Equitable opened its first branch in Divisoria.

In 1958, Equitable established the only direct telex service between the Philippines and Japan at the time, with initial messages exchanged between Equitable and Chase Manhattan Bank of Tokyo.

On August 15, 1963, Equitable established its first branch outside the Philippines in Hong Kong and only International Branch, the first time a Philippine bank opened a branch in the city. Two years later, on March 26, 1965, Equitable opened its first provincial branch in Cebu City. By 1972, Equitable emerged as the country's premier bank.

In 1977, the bank received its foreign currency license from the BSP and in 1980, issued its first credit cards under the VISA (credit card) and Visa brand. In 1987, Equitable became a universal bank and was appointed the clearing house of the Makati Stock Exchange, now the Philippine Stock Exchange.

In 1989, Equitable turned its credit card department into a wholly owned subsidiary, Equitable CardNetwork. With three other banks, namely Far East Bank and Trust Company (since merged with BPI), Philippine National Bank and United Coconut Planters Bank, it formed Megalink, then the Philippines' largest ATM network.

On July 27, 1996, Equitable Savings Bank was established as Equitable's savings bank arm. Equitable listed on the Philippine Stock Exchange on April 3, 1997, and in 1999.

=== PCIBank history ===
PCI Bank Logo prior to merger with Equitable Banking Corporation

PCIBank has a diverse and unique history. It was established in July 1938 as the Philippine Commercial Industrial Bank, with its head office in Dasmariñas Street, Binondo, Manila. In 1966, it moved its head office to the corner of T.M. Kalaw and A. Mabini Streets (building now demolished). In 1976, it merged with the Philippine Bank of Commerce and Merchants Banking Corporation, creating then the largest branch network. This tripartite merger transformed PCIBank into one of the largest financial institutions in the country.

The 1980s was a very significant decade in the bank; in 1982 it officially decided to adopt the history of the Philippine Bank of Commerce (PBC), resulting in it becoming the first Filipino-owned private commercial bank in the country. It established its ExpressPadala Center in Ermita, and pioneered the remittance business in the country. In 1983, it decided to change the "I" in PCIBank from "Industrial" to "International", to reflect the wide foreign office network of the bank. In 1985, it merged with the Insular Bank of Asia and America.

In 1987, John Gokongwei bought shares in the bank, becoming the second largest stockholder. He appointed Rafael Buenaventura to head PCIBank as President and CEO.

PCI Bank has won a string of "Bank of the Year" awards from the editors of Euromoney and Asiamoney. The bank has also been cited for its export financing, specialized lending and consumer finance activities by the Philippine Export and Foreign Loan Guarantee Corporation, the Development Bank of the Philippines, and the Home Insurance and Guaranty Corporation.

Addressing the various needs of its customers, PCI Bank set up subsidiaries to provide services ranging from leasing, investment banking and stock market transactions to credit cards, consumer loans, insurance, and overseas remittances.

The 1980s proved hard for the Lopezes because all of their businesses were seized by President Marcos. To this day, the Romualdez-Lopez dispute case still remains at court. Also in the 1980s, when Gokongwei entered PCIBank, he also owned Far East Bank and Trust Co, and talks of a merger surfaced which would have created the largest bank in the Philippines.

In 1991, PCIBank formed BancNet along with Security Bank, Chinabank, RCBC, Allied Bank (merged with PNB), Metrobank, International Corporate Bank (now part of UnionBank) and Citytrust Savings Bank. BancNet was also the brainchild of one of PCIBank's senior officers, Ramon Arceo Jr., the Senior Vice President.

The PCIBank Group also had three companies/subsidiaries listed at the Philippine Stock Exchange, namely the mother bank itself (PSE:PCI); Bankard, now an affiliate of RCBC (PSE:BKD); and PCI Leasing and Finance (PSE:PCIL), now named BDO Leasing and Finance (PSE:BLFI).

== Ownership ==
Before merging with Banco de Oro:

- PCD Nominee Corporation: 2.31%
- Go Family: 24.76%
- Government Service Insurance System (Philippines): 12.7%
- Social Security System: 29%
- Trans Middle East Philippines Equities: 7.13% (the company of former Chairman Martin Romualdez)
- Shoemart: 2.15%
- EBC Investments: 10.48%
- Public stock: 6.81%

After SM Investments Corporation bought the majority stake:

- SM Investments Corporation: 85.6%
- Trans Middle East Philippines Equities: 7.13% (the company of former Chairman Martin Romualdez)

== Competition ==
Equitable PCI Bank's main competitors included Metrobank, Bank of the Philippine Islands (BPI), Landbank and Philippine National Bank (PNB).

== Firsts ==
It is a member of both leading ATM networks in the Philippines; Equitable Bank's Megalink of which it is a founding member and PCIBank's BancNet of which it is the BancNet Operator along with Metrobank and RCBC.

== See also ==
- BancNet (the PCI Bank ATM network)
- Megalink (the Equitable Banking Corporation ATM network)
- Expressnet (the BDO ATM network)
- Banco de Oro
- Banco de Oro-Equitable PCI Bank merger
- Far East Bank and Trust Company (PCIBank's sister bank; acquired by BPI)
- Bank of Commerce (Equitable Bank's sister bank; now a member of the San Miguel Group of Companies)
