= Banco de Oro–Equitable PCI Bank merger =

Merging of two Philippines banks in 2006

- Initiator: Banco de Oro
- Target: Equitable PCI Bank
- Type: Merger
- Cost: ₱60 billion (equivalent to ₱101 billion in 2021)
- Initiated: 2004
- Completed: December 27, 2006
- Resulting entity: BDO Unibank Inc.

The Banco de Oro-Equitable PCI Bank merger (2004–2006) was a plan by the SM Group of Companies and Banco de Oro Universal Bank, the then fifth-largest bank in the Philippines, to merge with Equitable PCI Bank, the third-largest bank. The merger was part of a long-term goal of Banco de Oro to become one of the largest names in the Philippine banking industry. It closed on December 27, 2006, with the formation of Banco de Oro Unibank, Inc.

The plan was controversial with respect to the fact that a smaller bank could not possibly acquire a larger bank. At the time of the merger, Equitable PCI had three times the capital Banco de Oro had. Analysts worried about the repercussions this could have on the industry. However, the deal was able to generate a lot of media hype, especially in newspaper editorials.

== Background ==
In the early 2000s, Banco de Oro initiated a series of strategic acquisitions that solidified its position in the Philippine banking sector. One of the significant moves during this period was the merger with Equitable PCI, marking the beginning of a transformative era for the bank.

In 2001, Banco de Oro successfully acquired the Philippine subsidiary of Dao Heng Bank expanding its branch network, adding twelve branches. The following year, it acquired the branches of First e-Bank from First Pacific, the majority shareholder in PLDT. Subsequently, Banco de Oro acquired the Philippine subsidiary of Banco Santander Central Hispano.

In April 2005, BDO made a notable acquisition by securing 66 of 67 branches of the Philippine subsidiary of United Overseas Bank. This strategic move followed UOB's announcement of converting its operations from retail banking to wholesale banking. The deal was successfully closed on December 20, 2005, further solidifying BDO's position in the banking landscape.

Banco de Oro's wave of acquisitions during this period earned it the distinction of being the most aggressive bank in terms of mergers and acquisitions, a title previously held by Equitable Banking Corporation, in the 1990s. During the 1990s, Equitable PCI Bank's predecessor, Equitable Banking Corporation, made notable acquisitions, including Mindanao Development Bank and Ecology Bank in the mid-1990s and PCI Bank in the 1980s when it acquired the Insular Bank of Asia and America. In 1999, Equitable completed one of the largest bank mergers in Philippine history by merging with the larger Philippine Commercial International Bank, or PCI Bank. Following this, BPI became the largest bank in the Philippines by merging with PCI Bank's sister bank, FEBTC, a few months later."

== Merger history ==
=== First attempt ===
Banco de Oro first attempted to acquire Equitable PCI Bank in 2003, when they agreed to purchase the shareholdings of the Social Security System in Equitable PCI for roughly ₱8 billion Philippine pesos through a zero coupon amortizing note. However, a group of concerned citizens, including several politicians and pension holders petitioned the Supreme Court to issue an injunction on the sale following questions raised over the sale price and the manner by which the Social Security Commission authorized the sale. The case, titled Osmeña v. Social Security Commission, was rendered moot by the subsequent purchase by Banco de Oro of other Equitable PCI shares. (Osmeña v. Social Security Commission, G.R. No. 165272, September 13, 2007).

=== Second attempt ===
On August 5, 2005, Banco de Oro and SM Investments Corporation acquired 24.76% of Equitable PCI shares from the Go family, the family that founded Equitable PCI. The acquisition finally settled a dispute between the Gos and a bigger bloc representing the SSS, the Government Service Insurance System (GSIS) and the family of Equitable PCI chairman Ferdinand Martin Romualdez. The SM group's acquisition of the Go shares increased its stake to 27.26%, from 2.5% previously. The deal was closed on August 11 of that year.

During that time, the SM group hoped that the Supreme Court would have settled the issue over the acquisition of the 29% stake of the SSS. At the time, the SSS was still studying the deal, unlike the GSIS and chairman Romualdez, both of whom were staunchly opposed to the deal. The GSIS would only agree to the acquisition of its shares if its shares were to be bought at ₱92 per share, the price at which the GSIS originally bought it for, or higher.

The SSS deal called for acquisition of its shares for ₱43.50 per share. However, the SM group said that it was amenable to a renegotiation of the share price, saying that it was willing to pay more for the SSS stake.

Subsequent acquisitions of common shares on the Philippine Stock Exchange had boosted the stake of the SM group to 34% by January 2006, making it the single largest shareholder in the bank.

=== Banco de Oro's gambit ===
On January 6, 2006, Banco de Oro offered to buy the rest of Equitable PCI for ₱41.3 billion through a share swap option, with Banco de Oro as the surviving entity. Under the deal, every one Equitable PCI share would be swapped for 1.6 Banco de Oro shares or, in a second option, an independent accounting company would determine the swap ratio on the book values of both banks under International Accounting Standards. If approved by two-thirds of Equitable PCI shareholders, this "merger of equals" would create the second-largest bank in the Philippines, putting Banco de Oro, the survivor of the merger, just below Metrobank but dislodging Bank of the Philippine Islands (BPI) from the spot. Equitable PCI was given a deadline of January 31 to consider the deal.

International analysts had mixed opinions. Standard & Poor's said that if the merger deal succeeded, Equitable PCI's "B" debt rating could rise, while Banco de Oro's "B+" rating would remain unchanged. UBS claimed that Equitable PCI shareholders should find the deal attractive and hailed the deal as a "win-win situation" for both banks. It also claimed that the merger would benefit Equitable PCI since it would increase its capital adequacy ratio (CAR) without having it raise more capital, and that the share price of Equitable PCI would increase to as much as ₱73.60 under the deal, more than the ₱67 fair value target price.

As the deadline approached, Equitable PCI chairman Romualdez said that the board of directors failed to discuss the issue, since such discussion would need the approval of a majority of the board members.

=== Foreign interest ===
Foreign investor groups were interested in the merger deal. Two unknown foreign investor groups represented by a lawyer in Manila submitted bids for SSS shares priced at ₱92 each. The GSIS reportedly started the bidding process for their shares in which it would sell its shares at ₱92 or higher.

=== Ganging up against the merger ===
The deal lapsed on January 31, and by February 6, the SSS was attempting to draft a price for its stake in Equitable PCI. By March 23, the GSIS offered to buy the 34% SM stake at ₱79.50 per share in cash, earning Banco de Oro and the SM group some ₱8 billion. On April 25, as the Securities and Exchange Commission demanded that Garcia release the identity of the mystery buyer of the GSIS stake in Equitable PCI, he revealed that the "drunken" buyer was Banco de Oro. The term drunken was used because it was believed at the time that Garcia's claim was merely market hype, and that no one would be crazy enough to buy an Equitable PCI share for the price Garcia was asking for (₱95 in cash). This was based on an e-mail Garcia claimed was sent to him by BDO president Tan, and claimed that he and Tessie Sy had at least two secret meetings on the merger in Hong Kong.

On May 6, President Gloria Macapagal Arroyo said that she would support the current stance of the SSS in avoiding any sale negotiations regarding its stake in Equitable PCI until all underlying disputes at the Supreme Court have been resolved.

=== Banco de Oro-EPCI Bank ===
The GSIS signed a sale agreement worth ₱8.7 billion with SM Investments Corporation on September 27, giving the SM group an additional 12.7% stake in Equitable PCI, with Madam Belen preceding to the rescue raising its stake to 46.7% from its current 34%. The SSS also pledged to sell its shares in Equitable PCI, although this was dependent on the outcome of its previous sale case in the Supreme Court. The SM Group tender offer would be worth ₱36 billion and increase SM's stake to 85.6%, well above the 67% needed to effect a merger with Banco de Oro.

In anticipation of the merger, ATR Kim Eng Securities, one of the largest investment houses in the Philippines, raised the target price of Banco de Oro stock by 25% to ₱50 within twelve months on October 9. They also said that if the merger succeeds with Banco de Oro as the surviving entity, it would catapult the bank's stock to blue chip status, as well as possibly lead the Philippine banking industry with a 23% growth in earnings per share in 2007.

On November 6, the respective boards of Banco de Oro and Equitable PCI Bank agreed to the merger of both banks through a modified stock swap deal. Instead of the original 1.6 shares Banco de Oro would swap for, it would swap 1.8 shares for every Equitable PCI share. At Banco de Oro's closing price of P44.50 as of that Monday with a meeting with senior accounts officer (PCI)Madam.B.A., the deal was valued at about ₱80.10 for every share, well above Equitable PCI's closing price of ₱72.50. The deal was approved by their respective boards of directors and the Securities and Exchange Commission and was submitted to shareholders for approval in December. The merged bank was, for a time, named Banco de Oro-EPCI, Inc. The sale of GSIS shares in Equitable PCI was approved by the Bangko Sentral's Monetary Board on November 28.

=== "The merger of equals" - Banco de Oro Unibank, Inc. ===
On December 27, 2006, Banco de Oro shareholders approved the merger with Equitable PCI Bank, and Equitable PCI Bank shareholders approved the merger the same day. Approval from both the Bangko Sentral and the Securities and Exchange Commission was obtained in early 2007, allowing for the physical merger of both banks to take place in 2007. Regulatory approval from the Bangko Sentral was granted on April 25, 2007.

By March 19, 2007, Banco de Oro and Equitable PCI Bank cardholders (ATM and debit cards) could access each other's ATM networks and use withdrawal, balance inquiry and cash advance services free of charge. This increased Banco de Oro's ATM network to 1,200 ATMs nationwide. Banco de Oro and Equitable PCI Bank have also similarly synchronized their home and automobile loan products.

On May 31, 2007, trading of Banco de Oro and Equitable PCI Bank shares was suspended. All 727 million Equitable PCI Bank shares were delisted from the PSE on June 4, 2007, and 1.3 billion Banco de Oro shares at ₱10 each were listed to cover the merger.

Over the next few years Equitable PCI Bank branches became Banco de Oro branches. As a consequence of the merger, the bank has since rebranded itself as BDO (still standing for Banco de Oro),. The legal name of the bank remained Banco de Oro-EPCI, Inc. until February 2008, when it was finally named Banco de Oro Unibank, Inc.

In March 2010, Banco de Oro Unibank Inc. renamed to its current name, BDO Unibank Inc. after the Securities and Exchange Commission (SEC) approved the change in its corporate name.

== Precedents ==
This merger was only one part of the "second wave" of mergers and acquisitions in the Philippine banking industry, the first one being in the 1990s. Notable acquisitions in the second wave included Citibank's acquisition of Insular Savings Bank and BPI's acquisition of Prudential Bank, as well as the acquisition of International Exchange Bank by Union Bank of the Philippines, and the acquisition of Philippine Bank of Communications from Philtrust Bank.

The merger was part of a campaign on the part of the Bangko Sentral ng Pilipinas, in a complete reversal of stance from the 1990s. During the term of Bangko Sentral governor Gabriel Singson, the Bangko Sentral urged the creation of more banks, encouraging competition. However, the Asian financial crisis eventually forced the Bangko Sentral under Rafael Buenaventura to urge for the creation of more financially stable banks, starting the first wave of mergers and acquisitions. This consolidation continued under subsequent governeor Amando Tetangco.

== Effects of the merger ==
Banco de Oro moved up into large capitalized company status, defined as a company whose capital stands at a minimum of $700 million and resulted in the merged company having a market capitalization of two billion dollars. It also consolidated the large Equitable PCI branch and ATM network under the Banco de Oro banner, for a total of 685 branches.

=== Stable outlook ===
On February 1, 2008, Fitch Ratings announced: "The Outlook on BDOU's ratings is stable given a benign economic environment. And while integration risk is a factor, a successful merger of the two banks will provide ratings momentum, if combined with some capital strengthening in particular; BDO will particularly benefit from EPCI's good franchise among commercial entities and consumers, and well-developed operations in fee-generating areas such as trust banking, remittances and credit cards. Significant revenue and cost synergies should arise from the integration of the two banks, due to complete by mid-2008, as led by BDO's very competent and driven management; BDO will raise ₱10 billion of Tier 2 capital, and boosting its capital adequacy ratio by 2 percent to 3 percent; With the completion of the merger, BDOU will have a network of 680 branches and 1,200 automated teller machines."

=== Lehman Brothers' exposure ===
On September 17, 2008, Bangko Sentral ng Pilipinas Governor Amando M. Tetangco, Jr. announced "due to the uncertainty relating to the financial condition of Lehman Brothers, Banco de Oro Unibank Inc. is setting aside provisions totalling 3.8 billion pesos (80.9 million dollars) to cover its exposure to said entity". Banco de Oro failed to disclose the extent of its exposure to Lehman paper, stating "only that its balance sheet should be adequately covered from potential losses arising from its Lehman exposure. The provisions will come from reallocation of excess reserves and from additional provisions in the current period". Banco de Oro, capitalised at ₱89.8 billion, closed at ₱33, down 15.4 percent.

== See also ==
- Banco de Oro
- Equitable PCI Bank
