= GT Capital =

Philippine Conglomerate

GT Capital Holdings

- G.T. International Tower, the site of the head office of GT Capital in Makati
- Type: Public
- Traded as: PSE: GTCAP
- Industry: Various
- Founded: 2007; 19 years ago
- Founder: George S.K. Ty
- Headquarters: 43rd Floor, GT Tower, Ayala Avenue corner H.V. Dela Costa Street, Makati Central Business District, Makati City, Metro Manila, Philippines
- Key people: Francisco C. Sebastian (Chairman); Alfred V. Ty (Vice Chairman); Carmelo Maria Luza Bautista (President and COO); George S. Uy-Tioco, Jr. (CFO)
- Services: Banking and Investments, Transportation, Real Estate & Manufacturing
- Website: www.gtcapital.com.ph

GT Capital Holdings Inc. (GTCAP) is a Philippine holding company founded by George Ty and now owned by his family.

== Formation ==
Established on June 26, 2007, GT Capital has business interests in auto dealership, banking, insurance, power, and real estate. On April 20, 2012, it debuted in the Philippine Stock Exchange with an initial public offering (IPO) of 47.4 million shares with additional 6 million shares earmarked for over-allotment.

== Subsidiaries ==
=== Financial ===
- Metropolitan Bank and Trust Company (Metrobank)
  - Philippine Savings Bank (PSBank) (88.4%)
- Sumisho Motor Finance Corporation
- Philippine AXA Life Insurance Corporation

=== Manufacturing and automotive ===
- Toyota Motor Philippines Corp. (51%)
  - Toyota Manila Bay Corp. (58.1%)
  - Toyota Santa Rosa
  - Toyota Subic Inc.
- GT Capital Auto Dealership Holdings Inc.
- Toyota Financial Services Philippines Corporation

=== Real estate ===
- Federal Land Inc.
  - Federal Land NRE Global, Inc. (20%)
  - Horizon Land Property Development Corporation
  - Grand Hyatt Manila
  - Marco Polo Plaza Cebu
- Property Company of Friends Inc.

=== Others ===
- Metro Pacific Investments Corporation (19.62%)
  - MERALCO (47.5%)
  - Maynilad (37.5%)

Viva Entertainment (3.96%)
