= Philippine Bank of Communications =

Bank in the Philippines

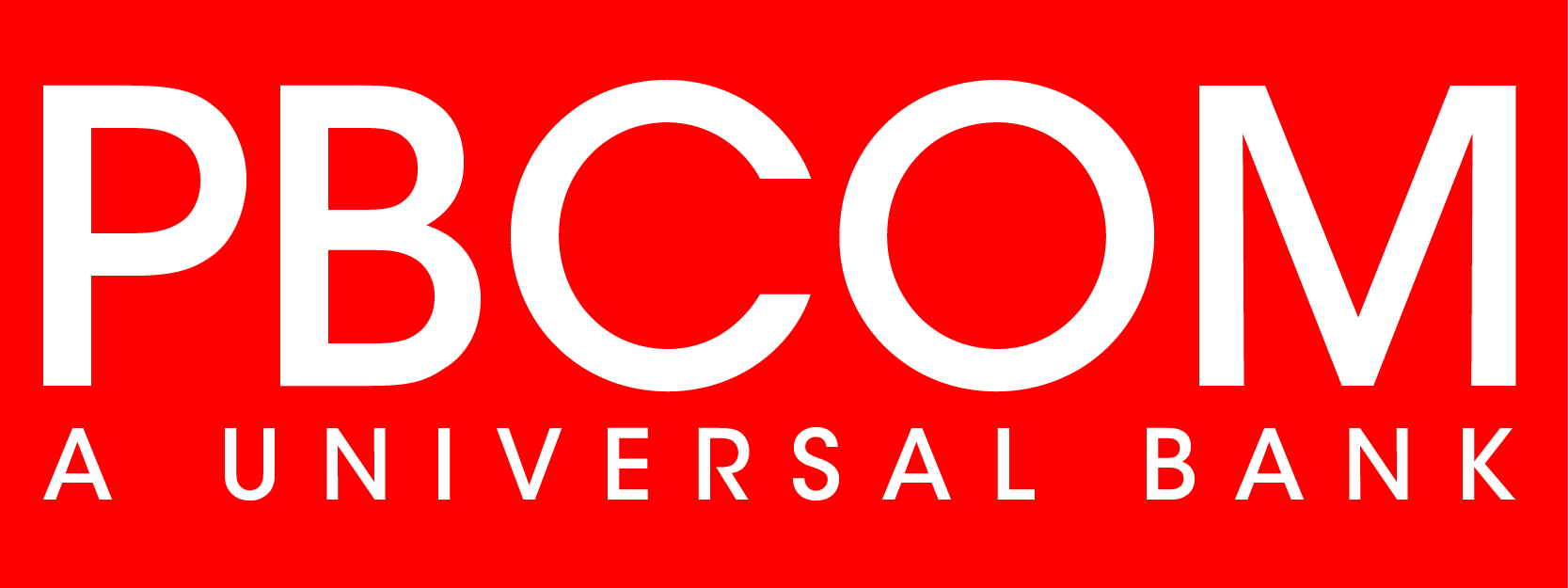

- PBCom Tower in Makati, 2019
- Type: Public
- Traded as: PSE: PBC
- Industry: Finance and insurance
- Founded: Manila, Philippines (August 23, 1939; 86 years ago)
- Headquarters: PBCOM Tower, Makati, Philippines
- Key people: Eric O. Recto (Chairman); Leonardo B. Dayao (Vice Chairman); Patricia May T. Siy (President and CEO)
- Products: Financial services
- Net income: ▲PHP 2.21 billion (2024)
- Number of employees: 1,328 (2019)
- Website: pbcom.com.ph

The Philippine Bank of Communications, (Note: Hokkien Chinese: 菲律賓交通銀行; Pe̍h-ōe-jī: Hui-li̍p-pin Kau-thong Gûn-hâng; Mandarin simplified Chinese: 菲律宾交通银行; traditional Chinese: 菲律賓交通銀行; pinyin: Fēilǜbīn Jiāotōng Yínháng) more commonly known as PBCOM, is a Philippine universal bank founded in 1939. Its headquarters are located at the PBCom Tower in Makati, the second-tallest building in the Philippines.

== History ==
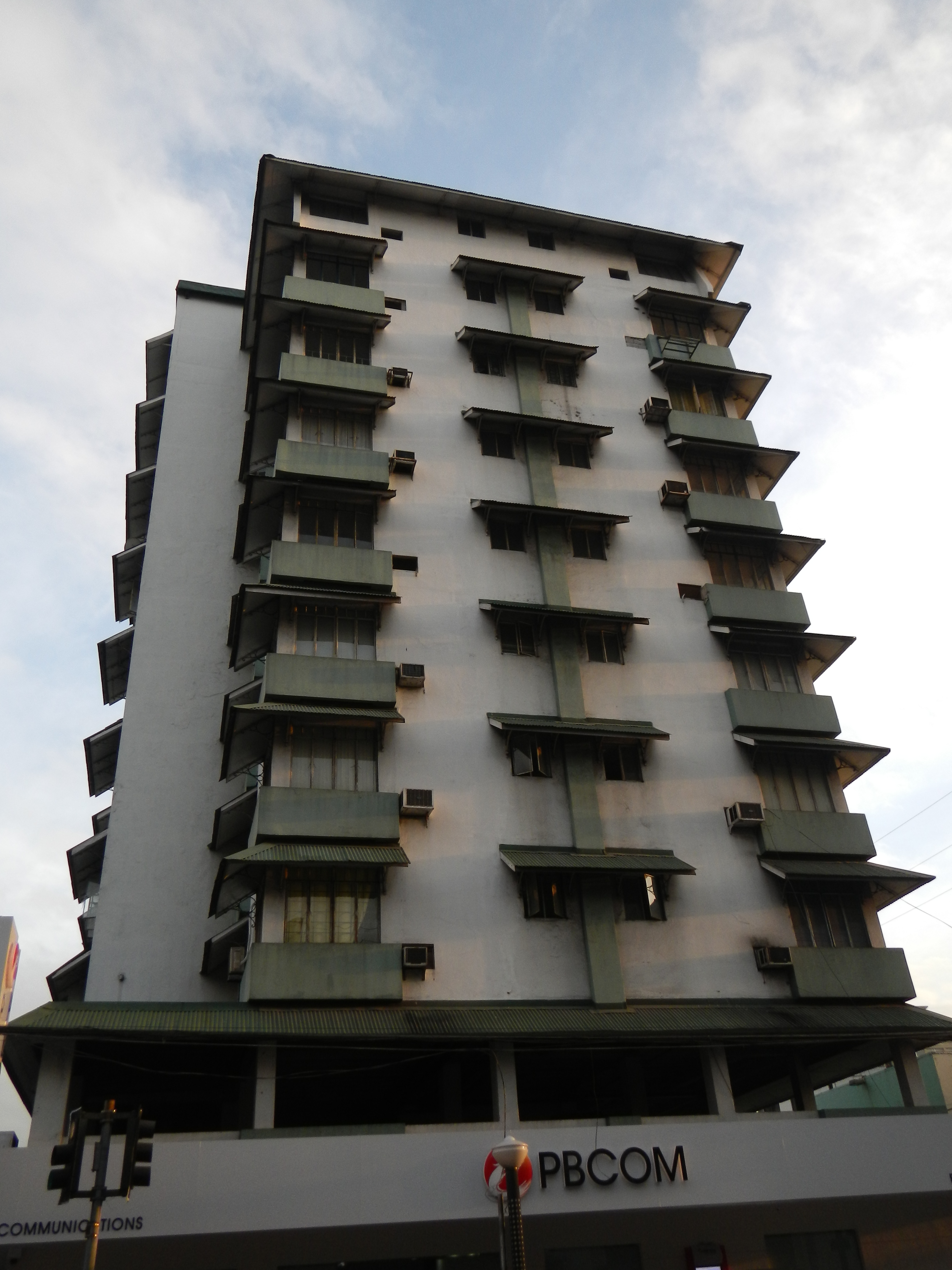
Facade of PBCom building in Manila

PBCOM started as the Philippine branch of the Chinese Bank of Communications, which became one of the first non-American foreign commercial banks to operate in the Philippines (foreign because it was under Chinese control at the time) with the granting of its banking license on August 15, 1939. It was incorporated and registered with the Securities and Exchange Commission on August 23 and started operations on September 4. The bank started operations at the ground floor of the Trade and Commerce Building on Juan Luna Street in Binondo, Manila, with a staff of twenty men, all below the age of thirty and many fresh out of school.

During the Japanese occupation of the Philippines, PBCOM followed most other banks at the time and closed operations. It resumed operations after World War II in 1945 through the infusion of new financial capital, although it had to operate from another building as its main offices at the time were used as the headquarters of General Douglas MacArthur. Although it was not legally obligated to do so, PBCOM announced that it would honor all pre-war accounts, saying that the war and subsequent occupation of the Philippines was merely a long bank holiday that would have no effect on any depositary instrument PBCom had at the time. A year later, PBCOM would join the Manila Clearing House Association.

On July 15, 1947, PBCOM opened its first provincial branch in Cebu City and a year later leased a lot in front of its main office at the time. By March 1953, PBCOM's new six-story headquarters was inaugurated. The bank's trust department was established in 1962 and its headquarters remodeled in 1964, which included the retrofitting of the building to house Binondo's first escalator.

On June 21, 1974, the then Chinese-owned PBCOM was put under majority Filipino control with the purchase of a majority stake in the bank by Ralph Nubla and his company. The new management subsequently infused an additional 83 million pesos in capital, and established its treasuries group later in the year. PBCom was subsequently accredited as a certified government securities dealer in 1981.

PBCOM was listed on the Manila and Makati Stock Exchanges (now the Philippine Stock Exchange) in 1988 and reached an agreement with Filinvest Land to develop its properties on Ayala Avenue. In May 1997, the property was developed into the 52-storey PBCom Tower, the bank's new headquarters and the tallest building in the Philippines. PBCOM relocated its original Cebu City branch in 1999 and celebrated its sixtieth anniversary in September 1999. 2.6 billion pesos of fresh capital was infused in 2000 and PBCOM subsequently acquired Consumer Savings Bank, a nineteen-branch savings bank. The bank moved into PBCOM Tower in 2001, occupying the first ten floors. Because of the move, PBCOM subsequently refreshed its image with a new logo.

PBCOM issued its first international credit card, a MasterCard issued in joint partnership with Standard Chartered Bank, in 2002. It subsequently introduced online banking in 2003 and was infused with an additional three billion pesos in fresh capital. As a show of support, the Philippine Deposit Insurance Corporation gave PBCOM an additional 7.64 billion pesos in financial enhancement funds, which formed part of PBCOM's comprehensive business plan. The funds were really used to buy high-yielding government securities that would stop the true sale of any non-performing assets to a special purpose vehicle, or SPV.

On November 22, 2006, Philtrust Bank expressed their intention to buy 58% of PBCOM, buying the stakes of the Nubla and Chung families. The Luy family, the owners of the largest share of PBCOM, refused to discuss the deal. If it succeeded, it would have moved Philtrust up to the thirteenth largest lender in the country and the transaction would have been the fourth bank merger of that year, after the mergers of Prudential Bank into BPI, International Exchange Bank into Union Bank of the Philippines and the Banco de Oro-Equitable PCI Bank merger.

On July 26, 2011, a Memorandum of Agreement was signed among the 3 major shareholders of the Bank and the ISM Group for the sale of the three major shareholders in the Bank representing approximately 97.28% of the Bank's outstanding capital. The Chung and Nubla Groups reinvested proceeds of the sale of their respective shares in the Bank.

On May 8, 2012, SEC approved the quasi-reorganization of PBCOM. Eric O. Recto was elected as the bank's chairman during the regular board meeting. In August 2012, Nina D. Aguas joined PBCOM as president and CEO.

As of the third quarter of 2013, PBCOM reported a P1.4 billion net income, a 70% improvement year on year.

In 2014, Lucio Co, a founder of the Philippine supermarket chain, Puregold became the largest shareholder of the Bank with the subscription to 181.080 million newly issued common shares of the Bank, equivalent to 37.7% ownership, by Co's holding company PG Holdings, Inc. At P33 ($0.74*) per share, the transaction was worth P5.9 billion ($132.52 million). In addition, Co acquired the 59.2 million shares of ISM Communications Corporation in the Bank, also at P33 per share ($0.74). As a result, Co owns 49.99% of the Bank. Co is the chairman of the Bank's executive committee.

In 2022, the Monetary Board of the Bangko Sentral ng Pilipinas (BSP) has awarded a universal banking license to Philippine Bank of Communications (PBCom) subject to certain regulatory requirements. In December 2021, PBCom submitted an application to upgrade its existing commercial bank license to a universal bank classification with the BSP. The license upgrade provides additional capabilities for PBCOM to invest in non-allied enterprises and allows the bank to expand its product and service offerings.

== Subsidiaries and affiliates ==
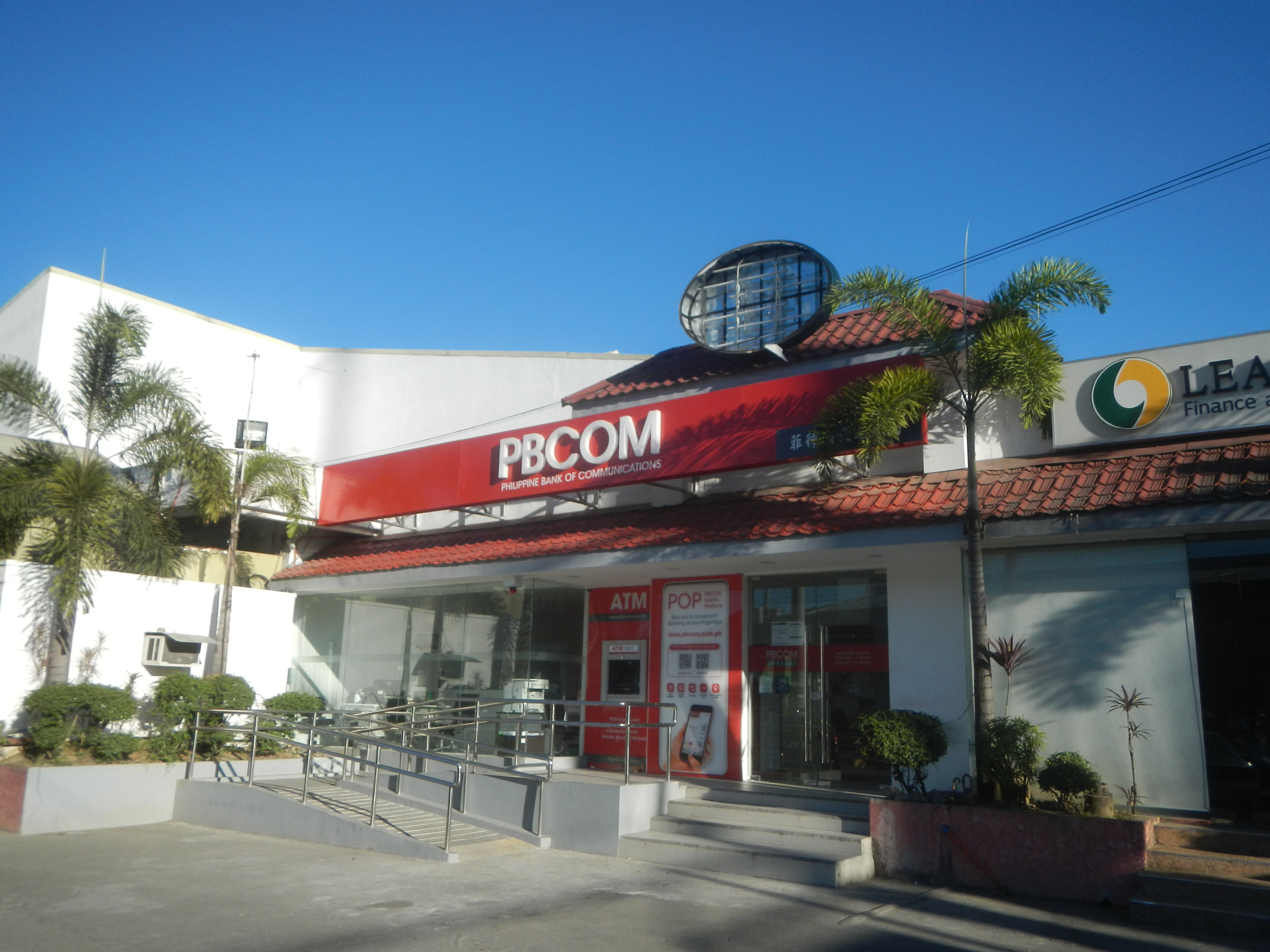
A PBCom branch in Baliuag, Bulacan

PBCom is a member of BancNet and the Philippine Deposit Insurance Corporation.

From 2014 to 2019, PBCom acquired a majority stake from the controlling stockholders of the Dipolog-based rural bank, Banco Dipolog, thereby making it a subsidiary of PBCom. In 2018, Banco Dipolog was renamed PBCom Rural Bank, and in 2019 it was acquired by and absorbed into Producers Bank.

== Competition ==
PBCom competes with other commercial banks, such as International Exchange Bank and other banks. It also competes with major banks, such as Metrobank, BPI, Equitable PCI Bank, Land Bank of the Philippines and Philippine National Bank.

PBCom's headquarters was also home to the headquarters of a competitor bank, EastWest Bank, who utilised the 20th and 21st floors of the PBCom Tower.

== See also ==
- List of banks in the Philippines
