= Accretion (finance) =

In finance, the term accretion refers to a positive change in value following a transaction; it is applied in several contexts.

When trading in bonds, accretion is the capital gain expected when a bond is bought at a discount to its par value, given that, it is expected to mature at par. Accretion can be thought of as the antonym of amortization: Accreting swap vs Amortising swap.

In a corporate finance context, accretion is essentially the actual value created after a particular transaction. A deal is earnings accretive if the acquirer's price-to-earnings ratio is greater than the target's price-to-earnings ratio, including the acquisition premium. Similarly, re mergers and acquisitions, accretion is referred to as the increase in a company's earnings per share on a pro forma basis following the transaction. (For example, if Company A has $1.00 earnings per share and after acquiring Company B, the combined company's earnings per share is $1.25, then the acquisition would be referred to as 25% accretive). By contrast, a transaction is "dilutive" where the earnings per share decrease following the transaction. See: Accretion/dilution analysis, Diluted EPS, Dilutive security; Swap ratio.

In accounting, an accretion expense is created when updating the present value (PV) of an instrument. (For example, if the present value of a liability was originally recognized at $650, which has a future value (FV) of $1000, then every year one must increase the PV of the liability as it comes closer to its FV. If the above liability, for example an asset retirement obligation, had a discount rate of 10%, the accretion expense in year 1 would be $65 and the PV of the liability at the end of year 1 would be $715.) Since the statement dates will not necessarily coincide with the anniversary dates of these commitments, the expense is prorated.
