= Borlongan =

Borlongan is a surname. Notable people with the surname include:

- Edwin Borlongan (1959–1982), Filipino driver/mechanic, one of the Bulacan Martyrs
- Elmer Borlongan (born 1967), Filipino painter
- Jeremiah Borlongan (born 1998), Filipino footballer
- Teodoro Borlongan (1955–2005), Filipino businessman
