= Banco Dipolog =

Rural bank; subsidiary of Producers Bank

PBCom Rural Bank
- Logo of the former Banco Dipolog prior to PBCom rebranding
- Formerly: Rural Bank of Dipolog(1957-2010); Banco Dipolog, Inc.(2010-2018); PBCOM Rural Bank, Inc.(2018-2019)
- Company type: Private
- Industry: Finance
- Founded: Dipolog (November 2, 1957)
- Defunct: 2019
- Fate: Acquired by, and later merged into, Producers Bank
- Headquarters: 083 Rizal Ave. Cor. Mayor Vicente Calibo St.,, Dipolog, Philippines
- Number of locations: 12 branches
- Key people: Mr. Jude Martin Raymund B. Saguin, President / Chairman Emeritus; Ms. Ma. Katrina Francesca S. Herrera MBA, EVP / COO
- Services: Banking, Insurance
- Parent: Producers Savings Bank Corporation (since 2019); Philippine Bank of Communications (2014 to 2019)
- Website: pbcomrb.com.ph

Banco Dipolog, Inc., previously known as Rural Bank of Dipolog, Inc, was the 54th rural bank established in the Philippines following the enactment of the Rural Banking Act of 1952. Justice Florentino Saguin, with the support of his son, Atty. Augusto "Tuting" Saguin, originally founded the bank as the Rural Bank of Dipolog, Inc. (RBDI) on October 17, 1957. It officially opened to the public on November 2, 1957.

== History ==
=== Rural Bank of Dipolog, Incorporated (1957 to 2010) ===
Banco Dipolog was founded in 1957 by Justice Florentino Saguin, who had recently retired from government service. With his retirement funds, he and his son, Augusto G. Saguin, faced a choice: to invest in property in Makati City or to establish a rural bank in Dipolog. Justice Saguin chose the latter, stating his desire to "spend what little time I have left and what little resources I possess for the benefit of the small people from where I came."

After complying with the requirements of the Central Bank and the Securities and Exchange Commission, the Rural Bank of Dipolog, Inc. (RBDI) was granted its charter in October 1957 and officially opened on November 2, 1957. The bank began with a paid-in capital of only ₱50,000 and operated out of a rented office in the Lacaya Building, which was then the only significant concrete structure in Dipolog. Justice Saguin served as the first bank president, drawing on his only prior financial experience as the chairman of the Mindanao Emergency Currency Board, which issued the so-called "Saguin Money" for the guerrilla movement during the war.

The bank initially operated with a staff of three: Augusto G. Saguin as manager, Mrs. Gregoria Espiritu as the bookkeeper-accountant, and Mrs. Araceli Zapanta as the cashier-teller.

=== Leadership and Growth ===
In 1965, following the death of Justice Florentino Saguin, his wife, Doña Consuelo Galleposo Saguin, took over the management of the bank. She led the bank for ten years, guiding its growth during its early stages. After her death in June 1975, her son, Atty. Augusto Saguin, formally assumed the roles of chairman and president. Under his leadership, the bank was recognized by the Bangko Sentral ng Pilipinas as the Top Rural Bank for Region IX in 1989.

RBDI expanded in the 1990s, opening a branch in Dapitan on January 8, 1998, and another in Sindangan on July 8, 1998. In 2000, it launched its microfinance loan product, "TIGUM," a Visayan word meaning "to collect." The acronym stands for Tubag sa Gikinahanglan Ug Magmalambuon, or "A solution for the needy and to prosper." At that time, it was the first and only accredited rural bank of the Microenterprise Access to Banking Services (MABS) within the province. More branches and other banking offices were later opened in the provinces of Zamboanga Sibugay, Misamis Occidental, and Zamboanga del Sur.

In 2009, Atty. Augusto G. Saguin passed on the management to Mr. Jude Martin Raymund Bueno Saguin, his son, who was elected president and chairman of the board of directors. Atty. Saguin's granddaughter, Ms. Ma. Katrina Francesca S. Herrera, was appointed vice president for administration and finance.

=== Banco Dipolog, Incorporated (2010–2018) ===
On April 17, 2010, the bank's name was officially changed from Rural Bank of Dipolog to Banco Dipolog, Inc. As of September 30, 2010, the bank ranked 14th in total capital, 29th in gross loan portfolio, and 42nd in total assets among over 600 rural banks in the Philippines.

=== PBCOM Acquisition ===
In 2014, the Philippine Bank of Communications (PBCOM) signed a memorandum of agreement to acquire a majority stake in Banco Dipolog from its controlling stockholders, subject to approval from the Central Bank. PBCOM President and CEO Nina D. Aguas stated that the investment would strengthen PBCOM's presence in Mindanao while providing Banco Dipolog's clients with a wider range of commercial banking products and services.

=== Producers Bank Acquisition and Merger (2018–2019) ===
In 2018, Banco Dipolog, Inc. was renamed PBCom Rural Bank. The following year, Producers Savings Bank Corporation acquired a 99.98% stake in PBCom Rural Bank. This made the rural bank a fully owned subsidiary of Producers Bank. The two entities were later merged, with Producers Bank as the surviving corporation.

== Branches ==
To date, they have 16 branches and 9 Branch Lites, nationwide:

- Dipolog (Main Office)
- Dapitan
- Sindangan
- Ipil, Zamboanga Sibugay
- Pagadian
- Dumaguete
- Cebu City
- Ozamiz
- Cagayan de Oro
- Iligan
- Valencia City, Bukidnon
- Calamba, Laguna
- Los Baños, Laguna
- Imelda, Zamboanga Sibugay
- Nagcarlan
- San Pablo, Laguna

=== Branch Lites ===
- Mandaue
- Aurora, Zamboanga del Sur
- Calamba, Misamis Occidental
- Liloy
- Manukan, Zamboanga del Norte
- Molave, Zamboanga del Sur
- Oroquieta
- Piñan
- Siayan, Zamboanga del Norte

== See also ==
- Producers Bank
- List of banks in the Philippines
