= Dilutive security =

Dilutive securities are financial instruments—usually stock options, warrants, convertible bonds—which increase the number of common shares if exercised; this then reduces, or "dilutes", the basic EPS (earnings per share). Thus, only where the diluted EPS is less than the basic EPS is the transaction classified as dilutive. Compare Accretion (finance).

Some examples of dilutive securities are convertible debt, convertible preferred stock, options, warrants, participating securities, two-class common stocks, and contingent shares.

The concept of dilutive securities is often a purely theoretical one, since these instruments will not be converted into common stock unless the price at which they can be purchased will generate a profit. In many cases, the strike prices are set above the market price, so they will not be exercised.
