= G.T. International Tower =

G.T. Tower International
- Interactive map of the G.T. Tower International area

General information
- Status: Completed
- Type: Office
- Location: 6813 Ayala Avenue corner H.V. dela Costa Street, Makati, Philippines
- Coordinates: 14°33′35.62″N 121°1′0.79″E
- Named for: George Ty
- Construction started: 1997
- Opening: 2001
- Owner: Federal Land, Inc.
- Management: JLL

Height
- Tip: 217.3 m (712.93 ft)
- Roof: 181.1 m (594.16 ft)

Technical details
- Floor count: 47 above ground, 5 underground
- Floor area: 82,773 m^{2} (890,961.16 sq ft)
- Lifts/elevators: 15 installed by Mitsubishi

Design and construction
- Architects: GF & Partners Architects, Recio + Casas Architects, Gozar Planners Phils. Kohn Pedersen Fox Associates (design consultant)
- Developer: Federal Land, Inc.
- Structural engineer: Aromin & Sy + Associates, Inc.
- Main contractor: C-E Construction Corporation

G.T. Tower International is an office skyscraper located in Makati, Philippines. The "G.T." in the name stands for George Ty, the building's owner and chairman of the Metrobank Group. Standing at 217 meters (712 ft), it is currently the 16th-tallest building in the country and Metro Manila as well. The building has 47 floors above ground, and 5 basement levels for parking.

== Design and construction ==
The G.T. Tower International was developed by Federal Land, Inc., the real estate arm of the Metrobank Group. The building's design was made by local architectural firms GF & Partners Architects and Gozar Planners Philippines, in cooperation with renowned international architectural firm Kohn Pedersen Fox Associates as its design consultant. Structural design was provided by Aromin & Sy + Associates, while the general contractor for the project was CIWIConstruction.

The tower is crowned with a 10-storey vertical fin. This fin marks its presence in the Makati skyline and provides a visual signature at the towers crown. Although the G.T. International Tower opened in December 2001, it was not formally inaugurated until September 20, 2004 in a ceremony attended by then president Gloria Macapagal Arroyo.

== Location ==
The building is located at the corner of Ayala Avenue and H.V. Dela Costa Street at Salcedo Village in Makati. It is also adjacent to the headquarters of BDO, a rival bank of Metrobank which is the main asset of the building's owner George Ty. It is situated near the entrance of the Makati Central Business District from Gil Puyat Avenue. It is a walking distance from most of Makati's other major office and residential buildings, including the second tallest building in the country, the PBCom Tower, and is easily accessible by public transport along Ayala Avenue.

== See also ==
- List of tallest buildings in the Philippines
