= The Real Bank =

The Real Bank, A Thrift Bank
- Formation: 1976 (as the "Real Savings & Loan Association Inc.")
- Type: Privately owned thrift bank
- Headquarters: Timog Ave., Diliman, Quezon City, Philippines
- Acting Chairman & President: Jose C. Nograles & Alfredo S. Barretto, respectively
- Website: http://www.realbank.com.ph (defunct)

The Real Bank, was a thrift bank based in the Philippines. In 2014, BDO Unibank, Inc., the banking arm of Henry Sy's retail and real estate empire, has signed a deal to buy Real Bank, a 24-branch thrift lender with operations mainly in Southern and Central Luzon. BDO will acquire all of Real Bank's recorded assets and assumption of all recorded liabilities.

== History ==
Established in 1976, Real Savings and Loan Association Inc. (RSLAI) started as a single-branch bank in Cainta, Rizal. It remained as such for more than fifteen years with minimal growth until the current group of owners led by Realty Developer Jose L. Acuzar took over in 1994. A new management came in headed by Jose G. Araullo as chairman of the board in 2003 and Alfredo S. Barretto as president in 2004. Also in 2007 the bank change its name from Real Bank, A Thrift Bank, Inc. to The Real Bank (A Thrift Bank) Inc. Further, the new management improved operations effecting significant growth in terms of the following:

Paid up capital increased to P1.8 billion, and additional capital of P1.2 billion is being processed for approval by the BSP.

Branch Network grew from four branches – in Cainta and Masinag of Rizal and in Malolos and Guiguinto of Bulacan – to 24 branches, including the transfer of its Head Office to Timog Avenue, Quezon City. The additional branches were distributed throughout the major growth municipalities of Bulacan, Laguna, Cavite, Rizal, Batangas, Pampanga and Metro Manila.

Products and Services expanded to include demand deposits, special savings, foreign currency deposit operations, retail and consumer lending, computerized CASA operations, on-site and off-site ATM's.

Resources continue to grow from its P2.39 billion level in 2003 to over P9 billion at the end of 2012.

In 2014, BDO Unibank Inc. acquired all recorded assets and assumed all liabilities of The Real Bank.

== See also ==
- List of banks in the Philippines
