= Whisper number =

Investing term

Whisper numbers are the "unofficial and unpublished earnings per share (EPS) forecasts that circulate among professionals on Wall Street... generally reserved for the favored (wealthy) clients of a brokerage." According to Per Afrell, a former analyst at UBS Warburg, buy and sell side research analysts generally maintain a 20 plus page spreadsheet to calculate their earnings per share estimates. When the estimate is first calculated by sell-side analysts, the number is submitted to companies such as First Call to be averaged with other analysts' estimates for the consensus earnings estimate. As new information is made available and plugged into the spreadsheet, the calculation may change several times leading up to a company's actual earnings release. However, the analyst is generally not going to issue a new report and revise his or her published estimate with each new calculation, resulting in the analyst's true expectations differing from his or her published number. Therefore, when someone within the firm, an institutional client, or even a retail client asks the analyst his or her expectation for the company, the response is often different from the published estimate. This number then gets passed among trading desks and professional traders as the whisper number.

Because the whisper number is the analysts' true expectation, it tends to be more accurate than the officially published consensus estimates. The Wall Street Journal found one website that gathers whisper numbers from research analysts and a Bloomberg News study found these same numbers to miss actual reported earnings by 21% while the officially published consensus earnings estimates missed actual results by an average of 44%. Furthermore, a joint study by the universities of Michigan, Indiana, and Purdue also found that whisper numbers were more effective at predicting actual earnings results than the consensus earnings estimates.

Consequently, stocks have been shown to react to whisper numbers more so than the consensus earnings estimates. A 2002 research report found that stocks of companies that beat the whisper number had an average one day gain of more than 2% while the stocks of companies that beat the consensus earnings estimate but missed the whisper number gained approximately one-tenth of one percent on the first day of trading. Furthermore, the joint academic study found that a trading strategy based on whisper numbers either before the company's earnings release or after the actual report "significantly" outperformed the S&P 500.

In one example, Deckers Outdoor (DECK) reported earnings of $2.69 per share after the market closed on Thursday, February 28, 2008 and provided 2008 earnings guidance above the consensus estimates. The reported results were $0.35 per share above the consensus earnings estimate of $2.34 per share. A number of analysts had indicated in the days and weeks leading up to its earnings release that they expected the company to beat estimates and the Earnings Whisper (R) number was $2.70 per share. The stock gained more than $10 during the two weeks heading into the company's earnings release at least in part due to the expectations of the upside surprise, but on Friday, February 29, 2008, shares of Deckers Outdoor traded down approximately $10 after missing the whisper number by a penny.
