= George Ty =

Filipino banker and business magnate

George Ty GCrL
- 鄭少堅
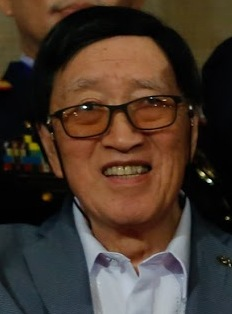
- Ty in September 2016
- Born: 18 October 1932; British Hong Kong
- Died: 23 November 2018 (aged 86); Manila, Philippines
- Education: University of Santo Tomas (dropped out)
- Known for: Founder and chairman of Metrobank; Chairman Emeritus of GT Capital Holdings, Inc.
- Spouse: Mary Vy
- Children: 5

George Siao Kian Ty OL (Chinese: 鄭少堅; pinyin: Zhèng Shàojiān; Pe̍h-ōe-jī: Tīⁿ Siáu-kian 18 October 1932 – 23 November 2018) was a Filipino banker and business magnate. He founded Metropolitan Bank and Trust Company, the second largest bank in both assets and capital in the Philippines. He owned stakes in Federal Land, Inc., the Bank of the Philippine Islands and Philippine Savings Bank, a Metrobank subsidiary. Ty was the owner of the G.T. International Tower in Makati.

== Early life and education ==
He was born to Norberto Ty and Victoria Ty-Tan. His father, Norberto, founded Wellington Flour Mills.

He attended the University of Santo Tomas, where he enrolled his bachelor's degree in commerce in 1955, but he later stopped his studies, to help his father in their flour mill business.

Because of his philanthropy and contributions in banking industry, his alma mater conferred him an honorary doctorate in humanities, Honoris Causa, on August 7, 2014.

== Business career ==
In 1962, he founded Metrobank, together with Emilio Abello, Pio Pedrosa and Placido Mapa Sr. Metrobank opened its first branch in 1963 and its first international branch in Taipei, Taiwan, in 1970. The subsidiaries of the company includes Toyota Motor Philippines Corporation, Philippine Savings Bank, SMBC Metro Investment Corporation, and Philippine AXA Life Insurance Corporation.

He also founded GT Capital Holdings Inc. in 2007, a holdings company which has business interests in auto dealership, banking, insurance, power and real estate.

== Death ==
Ty died on November 23, 2018, due to pancreatic cancer.

== Honors ==
- : Order of Lakandula, Grand Cross – (June 4, 2010)
