= Producers Bank =

Bank in the Philippines

Producers Savings Bank Corporation
- Company type: Public
- Industry: Financial services
- Predecessors: PBCom Rural Bank/Banco Dipolog; Rural Bank of Maasin
- Founded: November 27, 1995; 30 years ago in San Jose, Nueva Ecija, Philippines
- Headquarters: Ortigas Center, Pasig, Philippines
- Key people: Andres M. Cornejo (Vice Chairman and CEO); Sandra C. Mendoza (Vice Chairman); Andrei D. Cornejo, Jr. (President & COO)
- Products: Deposits, Loans, Remittances, Insurance
- Website: www.producersbank.com.ph

Producers Savings Bank Corporation (PSBC), commonly known as Producers Bank is a thrift bank in the Philippines based in Ortigas Center, Pasig City. Established on November 27, 1995, in San Jose City, Nueva Ecija, the bank has expanded its presence across the country.

Producers Bank provides a wide range of financial products and services to retail and corporate clients, including deposit-taking, loans (corporate, SME, and consumer). The bank also offers essential banking services such as ATM services, bank-to-bank fund transfers via InstaPay and PESONet, and acts as a direct agent for Western Union facilitating diverse financial transactions.

In its present form, Producers Bank has expanded through a series of acquisitions and mergers, and currently has a branch network of two hundred eighty eight (288) nationwide.

== History ==
Producers Bank was established as Rural Bank of San Jose City (Nueva Ecija), Inc., on August 2, 1995. Through the vision of its founder, Mr. Andres M. Cornejo, the bank continued to gain steam when it was registered with the Securities and Exchange Commission (SEC) on October 23, 1995.

The Bangko Sentral ng Pilipinas (BSP), then granted its Certificate of Authority on November 17, 1995, which allowed the Bank to officially start banking operations on November 27, 1995.

Producers Bank today is the result of several business combinations in the last twenty one (21) years that involved twenty four (24) banking institutions, including the following:

- In July 2019, the bank took over PBCom Rural Bank (formerly Banco Dipolog) when it acquired ninety-nine point ninety-eight percent (99.98%) stock from owning company Philippine Bank of Communications.
- In April 2024, the bank acquired the Rural Bank of Maasin, absorbing all the assets and liabilities of the rural bank located in Southern Leyte.

== See also ==
- List of banks in the Philippines
