= Metrobank Center =

Tallest skyscraper in the Philippines

- Metrobank Center in October 2026
- Former names: Federal Land Tower
- Alternative names: Metrobank Financial Tower; Grand Hyatt Manila
- Etymology: Metrobank
- Hotel chain: Hyatt (Grand Hyatt Manila)

Record height
- Tallest in the Philippines since 2017^{[I]}
- Preceded by: PBCom Tower

General information
- Status: Completed
- Type: Mixed-use
- Architectural style: Contemporary and Postmodern
- Location: Bonifacio Global City, Taguig, Metro Manila, Philippines
- Coordinates: 14°33′25″N 121°03′07″E
- Construction started: 2011; 15 years ago
- Completed: 2017; 9 years ago
- Cost: US$300 million
- Owner: Federal Land

Height
- Architectural: 318 m (1,043.3 ft)
- Antenna spire: 318 m (1,043 ft)
- Roof: 259.1 m (850.1 ft)

Technical details
- Floor count: 66 (+4 below ground)

Design and construction
- Architecture firm: Wong & Ouyang; Casas + Architects Inc.
- Developer: Federal Land, Inc. ORIX Corporation
- Structural engineer: Ove Arup & Partners
- Main contractor: Datem, Inc.

Other information
- Number of rooms: 461 (hotel)
- Number of restaurants: 3 (hotel)

Website
- manila.grand.hyatt.com

The Metrobank Center, formerly known as the Federal Land Tower and also known as the Metrobank Financial Tower, is a 66-story mixed-use supertall skyscraper in Bonifacio Global City, Taguig, Metro Manila. Standing at a total height of 318 m (1,043 ft), it is the tallest building and structure in the Philippines, surpassing the previous record holder, the PBCom Tower, by 59 m (194 ft).

The Metrobank Center was developed by the Bonifacio Landmark Realty and Development Corporation, a joint venture between Federal Land, Inc. (the real estate subsidiary of the Metrobank Group) and ORIX Corporation.

== Background ==
The Metrobank Center is part of Federal Land's Grand Central Park mixed-used complex. The Metrobank Center is connected through a common podium with the Grand Hyatt Residences, a 45-storey condominium skyscraper. The complex has a second residential tower, the Grand Hyatt Residence South Tower which stands 50 storeys high.

The building's pinnacle height is 318 m (1,043 ft) while its height up to its roof is around 259.1 m (850 ft).

The Grand Hyatt Manila is a major tenant of the building. The hotel has 461 guest rooms and occupies the top 25 floors of the building. It also hosts three major restaurants, namely The Grand Kitchen, No. 8 China House, and The Peak. It also has meeting and events rooms covering 2,281 m^{2} (24,550 sq ft).

== Architecture and design ==
Wong & Ouyang, as well as Casas + Architects Inc. were the architectural firms behind the Metrobank Center. Ove Arup & Partners was responsible for the wind, structural, and seismic engineering of the building. Arup devised its damp outrigger system to make the building resistant to seismic shock and wind. Concrete outrigger walls were installed in the Metrobank Center's two mechanical floors.

== History ==
In September 2008, Taguig Mayor Sigfrido Tiñga announced that Federal Land will be building a 66-storey skyscraper that would surpass the PBCom Tower, which was then the tallest building in the country, in height. The construction of the building, then dubbed as the "Federal Land Tower" was scheduled to commence within 2009.

The project would be formally unveiled by Federal Land in March 2011 with the groundbreaking ceremony taking place on March 24, 2011. Initially it was projected to be completed in 2014. While the building was under construction in August 2017, a fire incident occurred, though no injuries were reported.

The marker at the hotel's lobby was unveiled in September 2017 by George Ty of Federal Land and Philippine President Rodrigo Duterte. The hotel opened on January 23, 2018.

== Location ==
The Metrobank Center is located at 35th Street, between 7th and 8th avenues, in the northern district of Bonifacio Global City, Taguig, Philippines. It is a few blocks away from the Uptown Mall and Bonifacio High Street.

Records
Preceded by PBCom Tower	Tallest building in the Philippines; 2017–present 318 m	Succeeded by Incumbent
