= Banco de Oro =

Philippine banking company

BDO Unibank, Inc.

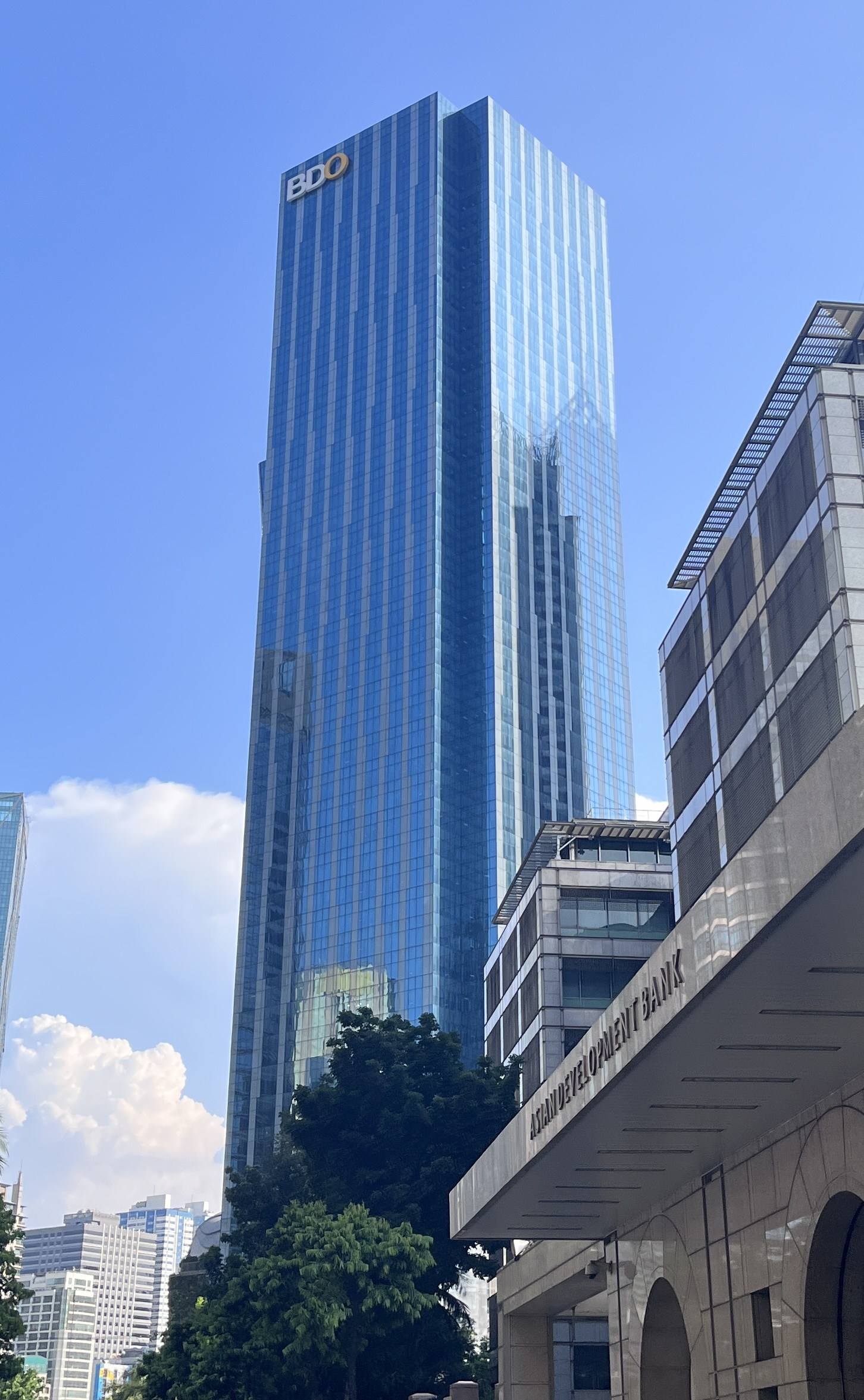
- BDO Corporate Center Ortigas, current headquarters of Banco de Oro Finance in Mandaluyong, Philippines.
- Trade name: Banco de Oro
- Type: Public
- Traded as: PSE: BDO
- Industry: Finance and insurance
- Predecessor: Equitable PCI Bank
- Founded: Manila, Philippines; January 2, 1968; 58 years ago (as Acme Savings); November 1976; 50 years ago (as Banco de Oro)
- Headquarters: Corporate Headquarters: BDO Corporate Center, 7899 Makati Avenue, Makati Central Business District, Makati City, Philippines
- Number of locations: 1,434 branches (2016); 4,466 ATMs (2016)
- Area served: Asia; North America; Europe; Middle East
- Key people: Teresita T. Sy-Coson (chairperson); Nestor V. Tan (president and CEO)
- Services: Financial services
- Revenue: ▲ ₱350 billion (FY 2024)
- Net income: ▲ ₱82 billion (FY 2024)
- AUM: ▲ ₱1.80 trillion (FY 2024)
- Total assets: ▲ ₱4.88 trillion (FY 2024)
- Total equity: ▲ ₱575 billion (FY 2024)
- Number of employees: ▲38,510 (2019)
- Parent: SM Investments Corporation
- Subsidiaries: BDO Capital; BDO Foundation; BDO Insure; Dominion Holdings, Inc. (formerly BDO Leasing); BDO Life; BDO Network Bank; BDO Private Bank; BDO Securities
- Website: www.bdo.com.ph

BDO Unibank, Inc., commonly known as Banco de Oro (BDO), (Note: Hokkien Chinese: 金融銀行; Pe̍h-ōe-jī: Kim-iông Gûn-hâng; Mandarin simplified Chinese: 金融银行; traditional Chinese: 金融銀行; pinyin: Jīnróng Yínháng) is a Philippine banking company based in Makati City, Philippines. BDO Unibank is a member of the SM Group and can be found at SM Malls throughout the country.

BDO is the largest bank in the Philippines by total assets, and 15th largest in Southeast Asia by total assets, as of March 31, 2016. It is the largest bank in the country by market capitalization, and has the largest distribution network with over 1,300 operating branches and more than 4,000 ATMs nationwide.

BDO is a full-service universal bank. It provides products and services to the retail and corporate markets, including lending (corporate, middle market, SME, and consumer), deposit-taking, foreign exchange, brokering, trust and investments, credit cards, corporate cash management and remittances. Through its subsidiaries, the bank offers leasing and financing, investment banking, private banking, bancassurance, insurance brokerage and stockbrokerage services.

BDO, in its present form, is a result of a merger between the original Banco de Oro Universal Bank and the Equitable PCI Bank in 2007. BDO's main competitors are major Philippine banks like state-owned Land Bank of the Philippines, Metropolitan Bank and Trust Company and Bank of the Philippine Islands.

== History ==
BDO Unibank was established on January 2, 1968 as Acme Savings Bank, a thrift bank with just two branches in the area before Metro Manila was formed. In November 1976, Acme was acquired by the SM Group, the group of companies owned by retail magnate Henry Sy, and renamed Banco de Oro Savings and Mortgage Bank.

In December 1994, BDO became a commercial bank and was renamed Banco de Oro Commercial Bank. In September 1996, BDO became a universal bank, which led to the bank's name being changed to the current Banco de Oro Universal Bank (BDO Unibank).

BDO Unibank eventually became involved in insurance services in 1997 (it is a bancassurance firm) by establishing a subsidiary called BDO Insurance Brokers. In 1999, BDO Unibank expanded its insurance services through partnerships with Zamora Assurance and Assicurazoni Generali s.p.a. (Generali), one of the world's largest insurance firms, and Jerneh Asia Berhad, a member of Malaysia's Kuok Group. In March 2000, BDO Unibank partnered with Generali Pilipinas Life Assurance Company and Generali Pilipinas Insurance Company.

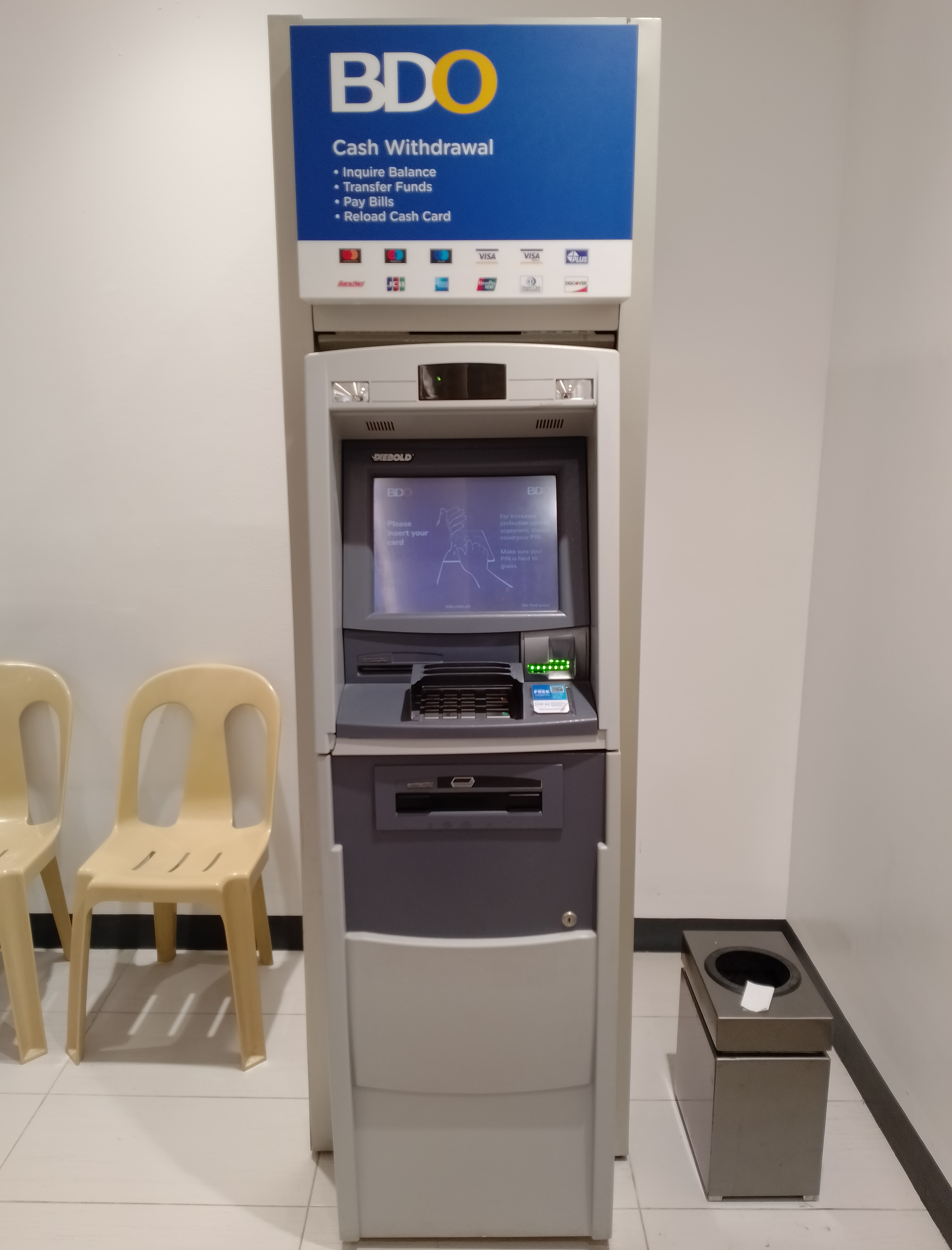
A BDO ATM inside SM City Cebu

=== Merger with Equitable PCI Bank ===
The current bank is the product of the Banco de Oro–Equitable PCI Bank merger. The boards of both banks agreed to merge on December 27, 2006. The new BDO Unibank retained the ticker symbol of the old Banco de Oro, and 1.3 billion BDO shares were issued in exchange for 727 million Equitable PCI Bank shares. Equitable PCI Bank was de-listed on June 4, 2007.

The entity was initially known as Banco de Oro-EPCI, Inc., but announced that it would go by the name Banco de Oro Unibank, Inc. starting February 2007. In 2010 Banco de Oro changed its name to BDO Unibank, Inc.

As of 2020, BDO has the largest distribution network with over 1,400 operating branches and more than 4,400 ATMs nationwide. It is the country's largest bank in terms of consolidated resources, customer loans, deposits, assets under management and capital, as well as branch and ATM network nationwide as of 2022.

== Ownership ==
=== Before "merger of equals" with Equitable PCI Bank ===
- PCD Nominee Corporation: 40.09% (35.64% foreign, 4.45% Filipino)
- SM Investments Corporation: 27.41%
- Primebridge Holdings: 22.08%
- SM Development Corporation: 4.04%
- Shoemart: 3.57%
- Public stock: 2.45%

=== Ownership after merging with Equitable PCI Bank ===
- SM Investments Corporation: 40.87%
- Multi-Realty Development Corporation: 8.81%
- Sybase Equity Investments Corporation: 5.14%
- Shoemart: 2.10%
- Sysmart Corporation: 00.14%

While the Philippine Central Depository (PCD) is listed a major shareholder, it is more of a trustee-nominee for all shares lodged in the PCD system rather than a single owner/shareholder. Major beneficial shareholders (i.e. those who own at least 5% of outstanding capital stock with voting rights) hidden, if any, under the PCD system are checked/identified and are disclosed with the Definitive Information Statement companies are submitting annually to the local bourse and Securities and Exchange Commission

== Subsidiaries and affiliates ==
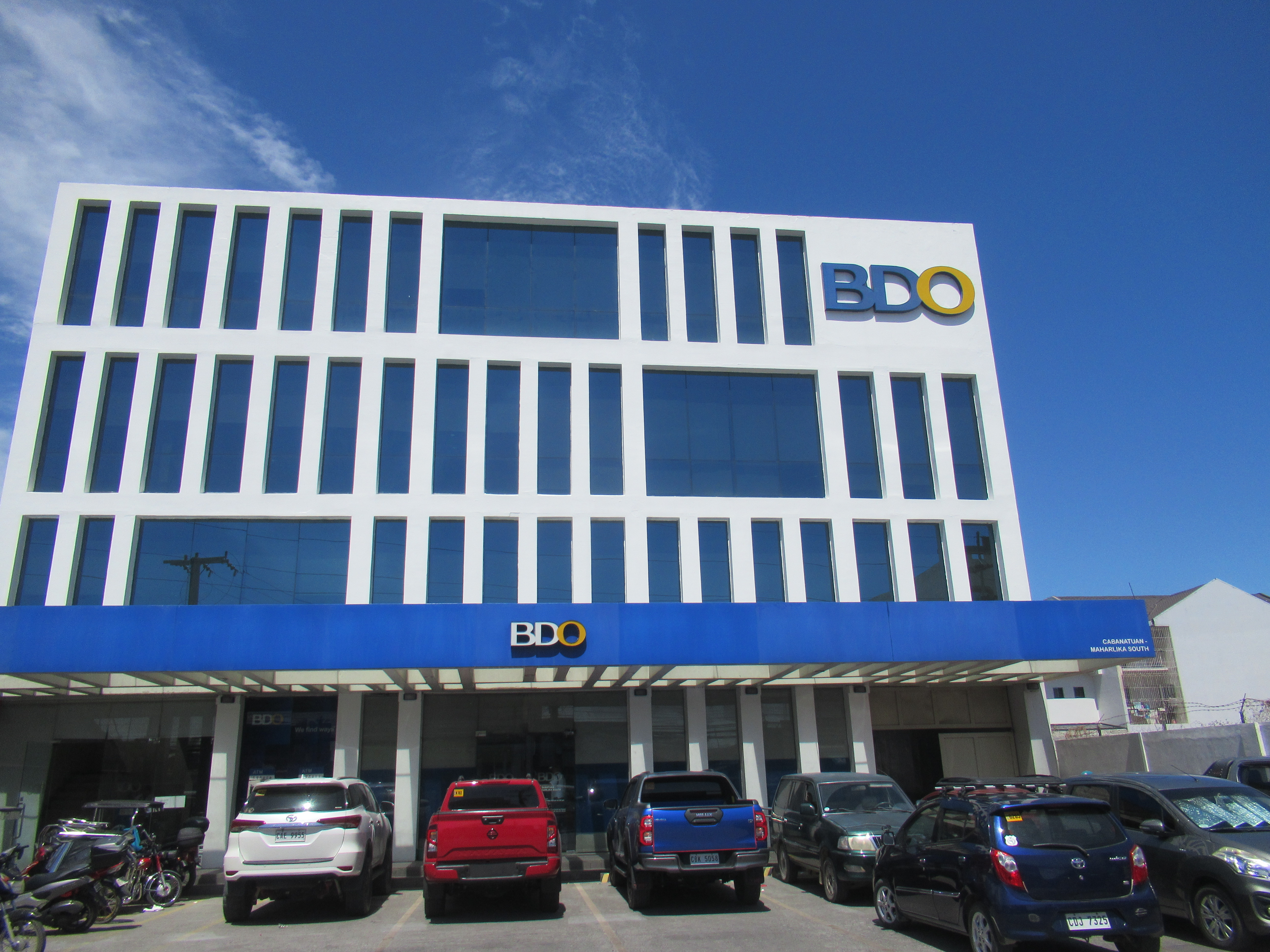
A BDO branch in Cabanatuan, Nueva Ecija

BDO is divided into the following subsidiaries and affiliates:

=== Philippine-based subsidiaries ===
- BDO Capital & Investment Corporation
- BDO Insurance Brokers
- BDO Leasing and Finance Inc.(Formerly PCI Leasing and Finance)
- BDO Securities
- BDO Private Bank
- BDO Realty Corporation
- BDO Securities Corporation
- BDO Strategic Holdings (formerly EBC Investments and 6 other companies)
- BDO Technology Center (Equitable Data Center and PCI Automation Center)
- BDO Trust and Investments Group
- BDO Life Assurance Company
- Equimark-NFC Development Corporation
- BDO Network Bank (Formerly One Network Bank. The largest rural bank in the Philippines)
- PCIBank Europe SpA
- PCIBank Securities Inc.
- Zamora Trust Services (CIMB Bank Authorized Agent For International Tax Payments and Tax Refunds)

==== Foreign-based affiliates ====
===== Affiliates =====
- North Pine Land Inc.
- SM Keppel Land Inc.
- Taal Land Inc.
- MMPC Auto Financial Services

== Mergers and acquisitions ==
=== Dao Heng Bank ===
On June 15, 2001, BDO Unibank merged with Dao Heng Bank's Philippine subsidiary, with BDO Unibank as the surviving entity. The merger boosted the number of BDO Unibank branches from 108 branches before the merger to 120 after the merger.

=== 1st e-Bank ===
In September 2002, Metro Pacific Corporation (now Neo Oracle Holdings Inc.) sold the operations and 57 branches of 1st e-Bank (formerly PDCP Bank) including its Smart Money Mastercard debit card issuer (which is a partnership with Smart Communications until 2017) to BDO Unibank. it later formally acquired and merged in October of the same year, All 1st e-Bank branches completed integration into the BDO Unibank network, increasing the Bank's number of branches to 177.

=== Banco Santander Philippines ===
In August 2003, BDO Unibank. acquired the local banking unit of Banco Santander with its commercial and other licensed activities to become BDO Private Bank, a fully owned subsidiary of BDO Unibank. The main goal the BDO Private Bank is to create market share in the Private banking/Modern Affluent Market segment by penetrating key areas in BDO Unibank's network. This is to complement and explore how the BDO Unibank Group can service all the financial and investment needs of the client.

=== United Overseas Bank Philippines ===
In late April 2005, United Overseas Bank, who gained entry into the local banking industry by acquiring distressed Westmont Bank in 1999, sold 66 out of the 67 branches of its Philippine subsidiary to BDO Unibank. It decided to rationalize its Philippine subsidiary's operations from retail to wholesale banking. All those acquired UOB branches completed integration into the network on March 22, 2006, increasing BDO's number of branches to 220.

=== Equitable PCI Bank ===
On August 5, 2005, BDO Unibank and an SM subsidiary, SM Investments, bought 24.76% of the shares of Equitable PCI Bank, the Philippines' third-largest bank, and 10% of an Equitable PCI affiliate, Equitable CardNetwork, one of the Philippines' largest credit card issuers, from the Go Family which founded the bank. BDO Unibank has also been offered a further 10% by another Equitable PCI affiliate, EBC Investments, and a deal is being made to buy (awaiting court approval) the 29% stake of the Social Security System (SSS), the Philippines' private sector workers' pension fund. Subsequent acquisitions enabled the bank to acquire a 34% stake in Equitable PCI.

On December 1, 2005, BDO Unibank shares were listed as a component of the PSE Composite Index for the first time.

On January 6, 2006, BDO Unibank, with the SM Group of Companies, submitted to Equitable PCI a merger offer with BDO Unibank as the surviving entity. Under the proposal, BDO Unibank will swap 1.6 of its shares for every 1 Equitable PCI share. As a second option, BDO Unibank also offered to base the swap ratio on the book values of both banks to be assessed by an independent accounting firm using International Accounting Standards (IAS). To effect the merger, BDO Unibank needs consent of Equitable PCI shareholders representing 67% of Equitable PCI. These include the Social Security System (SSS) with 29%, the Government Service Insurance System (GSIS) with 14%, and the family of Equitable PCI chairman Ferdinand Martin Romualdez with eight percent. BDO Unibank said that the proposed "merger of equals" would create the country's second biggest bank with assets of about ₱608 billion (as of June 2007), just next to Metrobank with ₱669.1 billion (as of June 2007), the current banking industry leader in the Philippines. Bank of the Philippine Islands is the current third biggest bank in the Philippines with P592.6 billion (as of June 2007). BDO Unibank has asked Equitable PCI to study their offer until January 31, 2006.

BDO Unibank President Nestor Tan also expressed of a possibility of a three-way merger with Chinabank, also an SM Group-controlled bank. Tan said that the proposed Banco de Oro-Equitable PCI merger would consolidate the strengths of BDO Unibank and Equitable PCI in consumer lending and result in a dominant player in middle-market lending and a market leader in money remittance volumes, branch banking, trust and corporate banking with the combined network of 685 branches located in the Philippines and abroad.

Although Romualdez and the GSIS have shown stiff opposition to the BDO Unibank-Equitable PCI merger, the SSS is still studying the possibility of a merger. In fact, UBS studied the deal and claims that the merger through the stock swap option is a "win-win" situation. It also claims that the deal under IAS standards are timely enough to facilitate the merger and that with the merger, Equitable PCI shareholders, under UBS calculation, would see the value of their shares increase to about ₱73.60 per share, more than the fair value target price of ₱67.

With Equitable PCI and BDO Unibank merging fully realized, BDO Unibank now stands as the largest bank in terms of asset in the Philippines. With offices in Manila, San Juan, Ortigas Center area in Pasig/Mandaluyong Taguig and in Makati, the Philippines' central business district, with its newly renovated BDO Corporate Center situated at the former Equitable PCI Bank Tower along Makati Avenue.

=== GE Money Bank ===
In 2009, BDO Unibank completed its acquisition of the Philippine operations of GE Money Bank with an agreement for GE to acquire a minority stake in BDO Unibank. In a definitive agreement signed by the two institutions, GE Capital will acquire a 1.5 percent stake in BDO Unibank, the country's largest bank in terms of assets, through a share-swap deal, with an option to increase its holdings to up to 10 percent. The takeover will involve absorption of GE Money Bank's 31 branches, 30,000 customers, and 38 ATMs nationwide.

=== Citibank Savings ===
On November 14, 2013, BDO Unibank. announced its plan to acquire 99.99 percent of Citibank Savings Inc. Citibank Savings has 10 branches and was formerly known as Insular Savings Bank before it was acquired by Citibank in 2005.

=== Deutsche Bank Philippines ===
In February 2014, BDO Unibank. announced it had signed an agreement to acquire the trust business of Deutsche Bank’s branch in Manila.

=== The Real Bank ===
In July 2014, BDO Unibank. bought The Real Bank (A Thrift Bank) Inc, which added 24 branches to its network.

=== BDO Network Bank (One Network Bank) ===
Before the end of December 2014, BDO Unibank acquired One Network Bank, the country's largest rural bank with 105 branches.

One Network Bank changed its name to BDO Network Bank in 2019.

== Recent events ==
=== EMV Debit Card ===
BDO is the first local bank in the country to roll out a debit card with an EMV chip embedded on it. The EMV chipping system, just like the ones on credit cards will also enhance the security of the debit card holders. The cards were released in 2016.

In 2017, they also introduced the EMV Visa Debit Card.

== See also ==
- Equitable PCI Bank
- Banco de Oro–Equitable PCI Bank merger
- BDO Corporate Center
- SM Investments
- BancNet (BDO ATM network)
- China UnionPay
- Chinabank (its sister bank, albeit with smaller capitalization)
- Visa Debit
- Debit MasterCard
- List of banks in the Philippines
- List of largest banks in Southeast Asia
