= Exportbank =

Export and Industry Bank
- Logo of Exportbank
- Company type: Public
- Traded as: Previously traded as PSE: EIBA and EIBB
- Industry: Financial services
- Founded: January 1997; 29 years ago
- Defunct: April 27, 2012; 14 years ago
- Fate: Under government receivership
- Successor: Unionbank
- Headquarters: Gil Puyat Avenue corner Chino Roces Avenue, Makati, Philippines
- Key people: Juan Victor S. Tanjuatco, President
- Website: www.exportbank.com.ph

Export and Industry Bank (EIB), also known as Exportbank, was a commercial bank in the Philippines that operated between 1997 and 2012. It was closed in 2012 by the Central Bank of the Philippines as being insolvent.

== History ==
It formed in January 1997 by the Lippo Group based in Hong Kong. It acquired Urban Bank in 2001 after the latter collapsed due to its closure by the Bangko Sentral ng Pilipinas.

It was placed under receivership by the Philippine Deposit Insurance Corporation (PDIC) on April 27, 2012, after it was closed by the Bangko Sentral ng Pilipinas on the basis of being insolvent. This was after fall-out of a rehabilitation deal with Banco de Oro Universal Bank (BDO) but did not push through due to the pending legal matters concerning the bank that stopped short of the deal. Exportbank had liabilities worth around PHP700 to 800 million.

In March 2014, Union Bank of the Philippines bought the remains of Exportbank. Unionbank's prospective entry as a strategic investor in EIB was backed by the bank's uninsured depositors. EIB had about P10.7 billion in uninsured deposits, a majority of whom—holding a combined deposit of P8.2 billion—had given special powers of attorney to a group called “Coalition of EIB Uninsured Depositors” seeking the rehabilitation of the bank as an alternative to liquidation. Union Bank proposed a scheme whereby P150,000 of every P1 million worth of deposits will be converted into equity in the parent company, the publicly listed Union Bank, Inc., while the remaining 85 percent would be converted to negotiable notes entitled to interest of one percent per annum. These notes could be traded and/or used as collateral.

== Subsidiaries and affiliates ==
Exportbank was divided into the following subsidiaries and affiliates:

- EIB Realty Developers
- EIB Savings Bank
- EIB Securities
- ValuGen Financial Insurance Company

=== Former subsidiaries and affiliates ===
- Urban Building Technologies
- Urbancorp Insurance Brokers
- Urbancorp Realty Holdings
- Urbancorp Technologies Corporation
- ValueFinance

== Previous Ownership ==
- Lippo Group: 37%
- AO Capital: 22%
- AMY Holdings: 20%
- RZB Group: 9.5%
- Public stock: 11.5%
