= Accretion expense =

Example

If an accountant originally recognizes the present value (PV) of a liability at $1300, which has a future value (FV) of $2000, the accountant periodically increases the PV of the liability, bringing it closer to its FV. If the above liability (an asset retirement obligation for example) had a discount rate of 10% per annum with annual compounding, the accretion expense for the first 365 days of carrying the liability would be $130, and the PV of the liability as of the end of these 365 days would be $1430.

A higher accretion expense should be recognized for each successive term of 365 days, so the accretion expense for the 365 days starting after the first 365 days is $143. At 730 days after making the commitment, the PV of the liability totals $1573.

In accounting, an accretion expense is a periodic expense recognized when updating the present value of a balance sheet liability, which has arisen from a company's obligation to perform a duty in the future, and is being measured by using a discounted cash flows ("DCF") approach. See also Accretion (finance).

In particular, "accretion expense" is a phrase used in topic 410-20 of the United States GAAP Codification of Accounting Standards (SFAS 143), which describes the reporting of asset retirement obligations. This kind of liability typically has a long and predetermined life on a company's balance sheet, and hence, as mentioned, it is valued via DCF. The accretion expense amounts to a change in the liability due to time and the discount rate applied.

In general, it is not to be expected that a company's statement dates will coincide with the anniversary dates of these commitments. Typically, a company prorates its accretion expense based on the amount of time that it maintained the underlying commitment during the period.
