= Stock swap =

Exchange of equity-based assets

Examples
- In 2010, two companies - Mirant and RRI Energy - came together to form GenOn Energy. The Mirant shareholders were given 2.885 shares of RRI for every share of Mirant that they owned. This stock swap helped facilitate the takeover by making the Mirant shareholders an attractive offer, thus convincing Mirant's board of directors to allow the takeover.
- In 2014, South Korean Internet giant Daum Communications merged with Kakao Corp to form Daum Kakao in a stock swap deal. The merger ratio was approximately 1.14 so it is regarded as backdoor listing for Kakao.
- In 2017, Disney acquired most of the 21st Century Fox assets in an all-stock deal valued at $52 Billion ($66 Billion if debt is included). With the acquired company shareholders owning 25% of the combined company, and Disney shareholders owning 75% majority.

In corporate finance, a stock swap is the exchange of one equity-based asset for another, where, during the merger or acquisition, the swap provides an opportunity to pay with stock rather than with cash; see Mergers and acquisitions § Stock.

== Overview ==
The acquiring company essentially uses its own stock as cash to purchase the business. Each shareholder of the acquired company will receive a predetermined number of shares from the acquiring company.

Before the swap occurs each party must accurately value their company so that a fair "swap ratio" can be calculated. The valuation of a company is complicated in general; here though, additional to fair market value, the investment- and intrinsic value are to be determined as well.

After the valuation is complete, the parties will agree upon the swap ratio; this will determine the number of shares that each shareholder will receive. In theory, a fair ratio is such that shareholders in both previous companies now own a pro-rated share of the new company: value-wise or re earnings per share. The acquiring company may also need to add an extra incentive in the form of shares to ensure that the board of directors of the acquired company approve the takeover. In South Korea, the merger ratio is defined by a certain formula according to the law, if both companies are listed on the KRX.

When this swap is realised, the shareholders receive the new stock and own a share in the new company. Sometimes, a part of the agreement will not allow the new shareholders to sell for a certain time period to avoid a sudden drop in share price. This is a form of a shareholder rights plan or poison pill strategy that is used to combat hostile takeovers. When all things come together and are fair, then the takeover will proceed without incident.

== Internal swap ==
Stock swaps can also happen internally within a company. Starbucks has used this strategy in the past. When the stock options they offered to their employees dropped so low in price that they became virtually worthless, Starbucks offered a swap option. The company allowed the employees to swap their worthless shares for more that had a higher value.
