= Toyota Motor Philippines =

Subsidiary of Toyota Motor Corporation, based in Santa Rosa, Laguna, Philippines

Coordinates: 14°16′23″N 121°04′39″E

Toyota Motor Philippines Corporation
- Type: Affiliate
- Founded: August 3, 1988; 38 years ago
- Headquarters: Toyota Special Economic Zone, Santa Rosa–Tagaytay Road, Santa Rosa, Laguna 4026
- Area served: Philippines
- Key people: Alfred Ty (Chairman); Masando Hashimoto (President)
- Products: Automobiles
- Owner: GT Capital (51%); Toyota (34%); Mitsui & Co (15%)
- Website: Toyota Philippines; Lexus Philippines

Toyota Motor Philippines Corporation (TMP) is an affiliate of Toyota, based in Santa Rosa, Laguna, Philippines, responsible for the assembly and distribution of Toyota vehicles in the Philippines since 1988. The company was established on August 3, 1988, as a joint venture between Toyota, Mitsui & Co and GT Capital.

Its main production facility, the 82-hectare Toyota Special Economic Zone (TSEZ), is located in Santa Rosa, Laguna for assembling cars. TMP is also the provider of financial services unit, Toyota Financial Services Philippines, and Lexus Manila, Inc., the official distributor of Lexus cars. In 2021, the Department of Trade and Industry awarded TMP with the Philippine Quality Award for Performance Excellence, the highest national award for organizations that demonstrate "management excellence".

== History ==
Toyota's presence in the Philippines dates back to 1962 when Delta Motor Corporation (DMC), a company established by Ricardo C. Silverio Sr., acquired the rights to assemble and distribute Toyota vehicles for the Philippine market. DMC collapsed as part of the fall out of the economic downturn during the latter years of the presidency of Ferdinand Marcos. All operations came to a halt on December 1983 and by March 1984, Toyota's tie-up with DMC was terminated. The company was dissolved by 1988.

When Toyota Motor Corporation president Shoichiro Toyoda came looking for a new partner in the Philippines, he sought out Dr. George S. K. Ty, and on August 3, 1988, TMP was incorporated as a joint-venture among Metrobank, Toyota Motor Corporation and Mitsui & Co., with Masao Mitake as its first president. The sale of Toyota vehicles in the country began in the following year through four dealerships.

In 1994, TMP captured its first "Triple Crown", being the leading car manufacturer in total sales, passenger car sales and commercial vehicle sales. It has continued its Triple Crown run up to the present, garnering 19 consecutive Triple Crowns as of 2019.

In April 1997, TMP opened its Sta. Rosa Assembly Plant complementing the operations at the Bicutan Assembly Plant (formerly, the Delta Motor Corporation assembly plant). In 2003, TMP's Sta. Rosa Industrial Complex is certified as an economic zone by the Philippine Economic Zone Authority.

The Bicutan Assembly Plant was closed in 2005 and all production was moved to Santa Rosa, Laguna. The old plant was largely sold off to real estate developers (on which some condominium complexes now stand) except for parcels that became the Toyota Bicutan Parañaque dealership, built near the Bicutan exit of Metro Manila Skyway System. By October 2007, TMP sold its 500,000th vehicle.

In 2021, TMP received the Philippine Quality Award (PQA) for Performance Excellence from the Department of Trade and Industry for its 2019 performance, the highest possible award for organizations that demonstrate "management excellence by the purposefulness with which it continues to improve and build upon outstanding results and excellent systems", and can "serve as a national and global model". With this, TMP became the award's second recipient in the PQA's two-decade history after Unilab in 2008.

For the 35th anniversary celebration of TMP, Group Chairman Akio Toyoda announced the return of the Toyota Tamaraw and its local production at the TMP Santa Rosa Plant will begin in 2024.

== Models ==
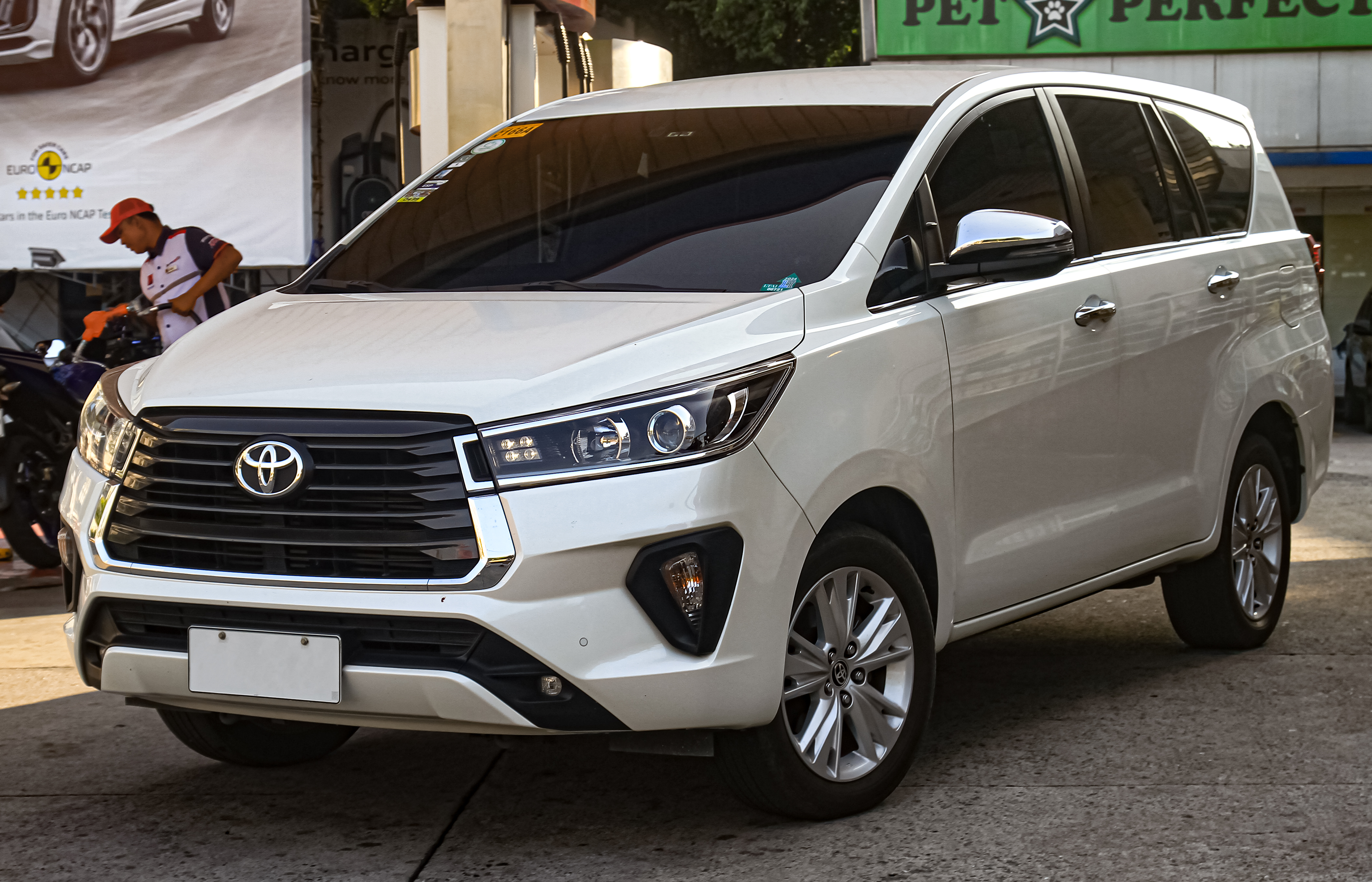
Innova

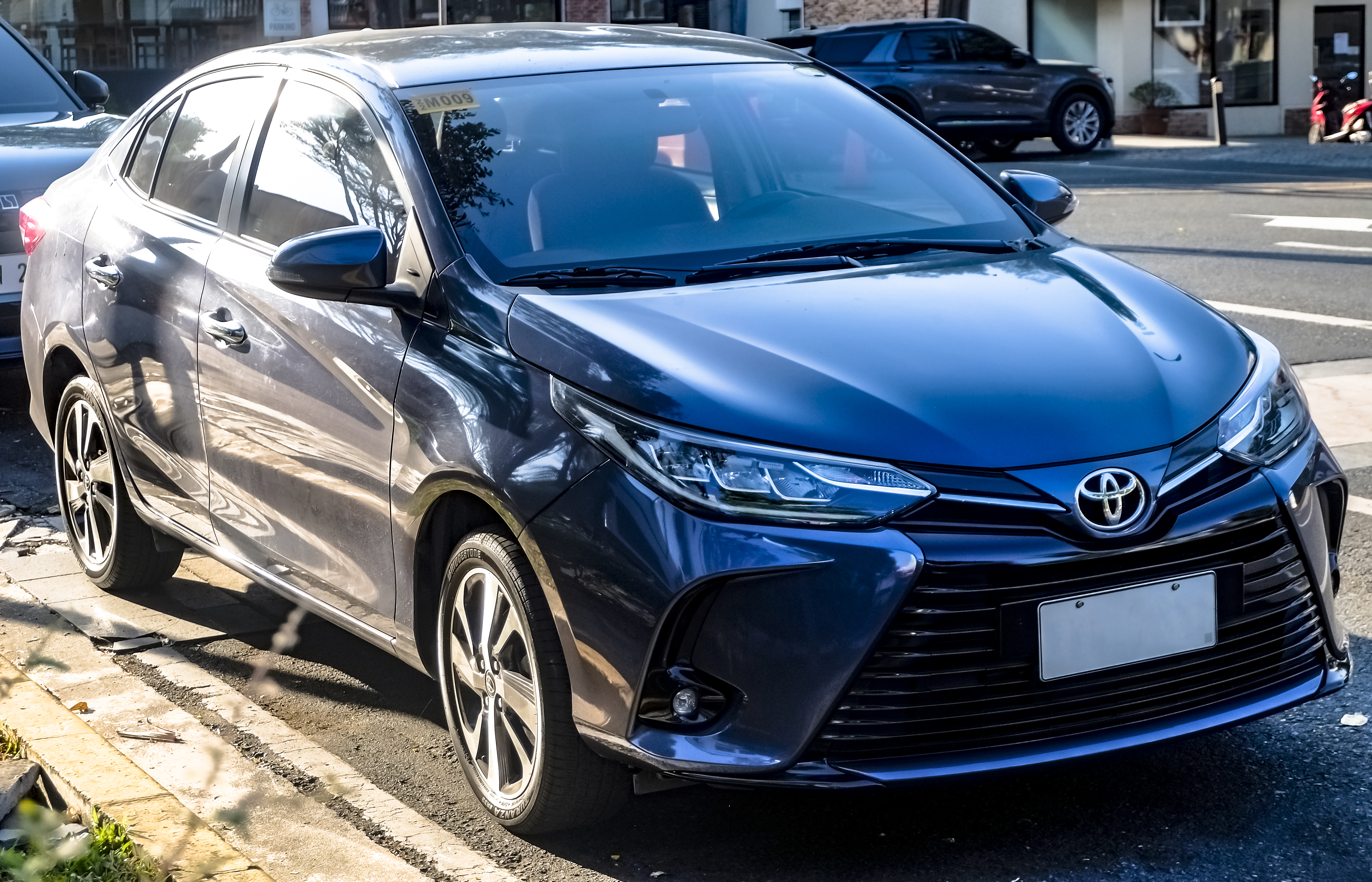
Vios

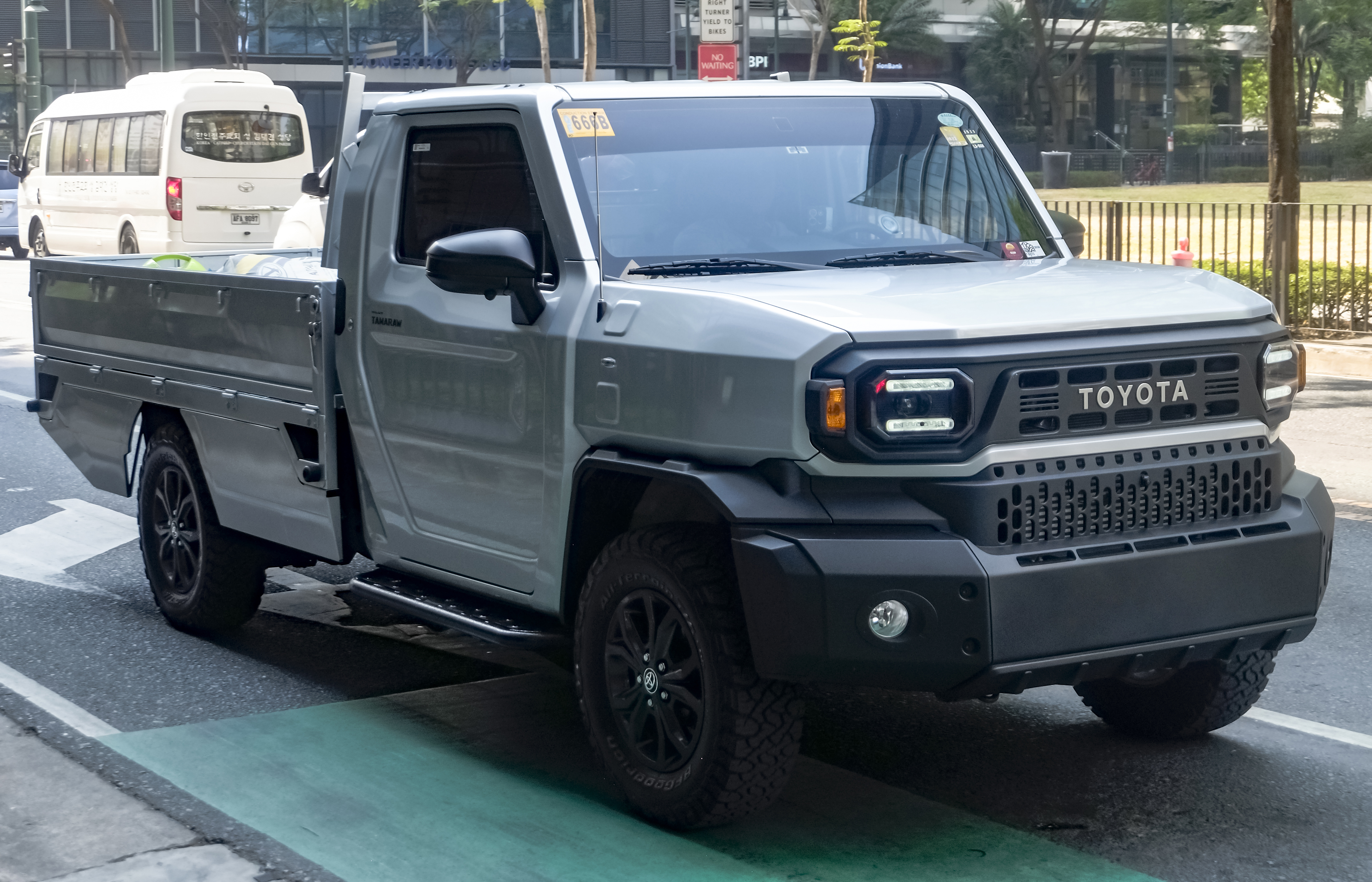
Tamaraw

=== Current ===
==== Locally assembled ====
- Toyota Innova (2005–present)
- Toyota Tamaraw (2024–present)
- Toyota Vios (2007–present)

==== Imported ====
- Toyota GR86 (2012–present)
- Toyota Alphard (2010–present)
- Toyota Ativ (2025–present)
- Toyota Avanza (2006–present)
- Toyota bZ4X (2025–present)
- Toyota Camry (2006–present)
- Toyota Coaster (1993–present)
- Toyota Corolla Altis (2008–present)
- Toyota Corolla Cross (2020–present)
- Toyota Fortuner (2005–present)
- Toyota GR Corolla (2025–present)
- Toyota GR Yaris (2021–present)
- Toyota HiAce (1990–present)
- Toyota Hilux (1988–present)
- Toyota Land Cruiser (1990–present)
- Toyota Land Cruiser FJ (2026–present)
- Toyota Land Cruiser Prado (1990–present)
- Toyota LiteAce (2022–present)
- Toyota Raize (2022–present)
- Toyota RAV4 (1997–present)
- Toyota Rush (2018–present)
- Toyota Urban Cruiser (2026–present)
- Toyota Veloz (2022–present)
- Toyota Wigo (2014–present)
- Toyota Yaris Cross (2023–present)
- Toyota Zenix (2023–present)

=== Former ===
The list only includes vehicles that were sold after the brand's return in the Philippines in 1988.

==== Locally assembled ====
- Toyota Camry (1996–2006)
- Toyota Corolla (1989–2004)
- Toyota Corolla Altis (2001–2008)
- Toyota Corona (1988–1999)
- Toyota Crown (1989–1999)
- Toyota LiteAce (1989–1999)
- Toyota Revo (1998–2005)
- Toyota Tamaraw FX (1990–2002)

==== Imported ====
- Toyota Echo (2000–2003)
- Toyota Echo Verso (2000–2005)
- Toyota FJ Cruiser (2013–2022)
- Toyota Previa (2003–2017)
- Toyota Prius (2009–2022)
- Toyota Prius C (2012–2021)
- Toyota Supra (2019–2026)
- Toyota Vios (2003–2007)
- Toyota Yaris (2007–2023)

== Leadership ==
=== Current ===
- Chairman: Alfred Ty (2019–present)
- President: Masando Hashimoto (2024–present)

=== Past leadership ===
- Chairmen
  - George S. K. Ty (1988–2018)
- Presidents
  - Masao Mitake (1988–1990s)
  - Hirotaka Tsuruga (1990s)
  - Nobuharu/Nobuaki Tabata (2002–2000s)
  - Michinobu Sugata (2010–2016)
  - Satoru Suzuki (2016–2019)
  - Atsuhiro Okamoto (2020–2024)
