= Teodoro Borlongan =

Teodoro C. Borlongan (April 15, 1955 – April 11, 2005) was the last president of Urban Bank and was one of the leading bankers in the Philippines during his time.

Borlongan was named one of the Ten Outstanding Young Men for domestic banking in 1993. He graduated cum laude from the Honors Economics program of Ateneo de Manila University in 1978. In the 1980s, he became president of Urban Bank, which he turned into one of the largest banks in the Philippines during his long tenure there. Court cases, however, forced the Bangko Sentral ng Pilipinas to shut it down on April 26, 2000.

Over the years that followed, the numerous court cases that came upon Borlongan, including charges of economic sabotage—then punishable by the death penalty, and what he thought was his failure to obtain justice from those who he accused as allegedly responsible for Urban Bank's permanent closure ultimately drove him into depression. On April 11, 2005, he brought flowers to the graves of his late parents and brother at the Loyola Memorial Park in Marikina. After sending an e-mail to a close friend and making calls on his cellular phone to his wife and close relatives, he stepped into his parked car and committed suicide with a gunshot to his left temple. He was four days short of his 50th birthday, leaving behind his wife, Dolly, and their four young children, Katherine, Jonathan, Christopher and Stephanie.
