= Urban Bank =

Philippine bank

- Company type: Defunct; later became part of Export and Industry Bank (also defunct)
- Industry: Finance and insurance
- Founded: Pasig, Philippines (1980)
- Defunct: 2001
- Headquarters: Makati, Philippines
- Key people: Fidel V. Ramos (chairman emeritus); Arsenio M. Bartolome III (chairman); Teodoro C. Borlongan (president and CEO)
- Products: Financial services
- Revenue: P27.2 million PHP (1999)
- Number of employees: 600 (at closure)
- Website: http://www.urbanbank.com

Urban Bank (PSE: UBI), also known by its initials (and ticker symbol) UBI, was a middle-sized bank in the Philippines. The bank, along with its two subsidiaries, declared a voluntary bank holiday for failing to meet withdrawals and was consequently closed by the Bangko Sentral ng Pilipinas and put under the mandatory receivership of the Philippine Deposit Insurance Corporation on April 26, 2000. It merged with Export and Industry Bank in 2001.

== History ==
Urban Bank was incorporated on July 8, 1980, as a private development bank. Later that year, the bank opened as a one-branch thrift bank in what is today Pasig.

In 1987 it became the first non-commercial bank to list on the Manila Stock Exchange and the Makati Stock Exchange (now the Philippine Stock Exchange) under the ticker symbol UBI. After its closure and subsequent merger with Export and Industry Bank, Urban Bank shares were re-listed on the PSE under Exportbank's ticker symbol, EIB.

In 1995 it became the first Philippine bank to issue SEC-registered asset-backed-securities.

In early 2000 it nearly concluded a merger with a smaller rival, Panasia Bank, only to fail after the BSP set new requirements on bank mergers.

On April 25, 2000, the bank declared a bank holiday to put a stop to panic withdrawals.

Less than twenty-four hours after the declaration of a voluntary bank holiday, and as a legal consequence of this, the BSP's Monetary Board ordered the summary closure of the bank.

After failed merger negotiations with the Bank of Commerce, in August 2001 Urban Bank shareholders approved a merger of Urban Bank and Urbancorp Investments with Export and Industry Bank that left Exportbank as the surviving entity.

== The charges ==
=== Investigation Slip No. 1512 ===
The judge, Zeus Abrogar, dismissed the charges against two of the defendants, Arsenio Bartolome III and Corazon Bejasa, who had been chairman and company secretary respectively, but found probable cause against the remaining respondents.

=== Supreme Court final ruling ===
On April 18, 2008, the Supreme Court of the Philippines 2nd Division the reinstatement of a PHP 4.5 billion (US$109 million) estafa case against executives of the bank including Nida S. Santos, Milagros Santiago, Rowena Punzalan, Chulla Formanes, Loida O. Payonga and Amalia Ordas.

== See also ==
- MegaLink
