= Earnings per share =

Value of earnings per outstanding share of common stock for a company

Earnings per share (EPS) is the monetary value of earnings per outstanding share of common stock for a company during a defined period of time, often a year. It is a key measure of corporate profitability, focusing on the interests of the company's owners (shareholders), and is commonly used to price stocks.

In the United States, the Financial Accounting Standards Board (FASB) requires EPS information for the four major categories of the income statement: continuing operations, discontinued operations, extraordinary items, and net income.

== Calculation ==
Preferred stock rights have precedence over common stock. Therefore, dividends on preferred shares are subtracted before calculating the EPS. When preferred shares are cumulative (i.e. dividends accumulate as payable if unpaid in the given accounting year), annual dividends are deducted whether or not they have been declared. Dividends in arrears are not relevant when calculating EPS. "Average common shares" in the formulae below refers to the average number of common shares outstanding during the time period.

Basic formula
Earnings per share = (profit − preferred dividends)/(weighted average common shares)

Net income formula
Earnings per share = (net income − preferred dividends)/(average common shares)

Continuing operations formula
Earnings per share = (income from continuing operations − preferred dividends)/(weighted average common shares)

== Diluted earnings per share ==
Diluted earnings per share (diluted EPS) is a company's earnings per share calculated using fully diluted shares outstanding (i.e. including the impact of stock option grants and convertible bonds). Diluted EPS indicates a "worst case" scenario, one that reflects the issuance of stock for all outstanding options, warrants and convertible securities that would reduce earnings per share.

=== Calculations ===
Calculations of diluted EPS vary. Morningstar reports diluted EPS "Earnings/Share $", which is net income minus preferred stock dividends divided by the weighted average of common stock shares outstanding over the past year; this is adjusted for dilutive shares. Some data sources may simplify this calculation by using the number of shares outstanding at the end of a reporting period. The methods of simplifying EPS calculations and eliminating inappropriate assumptions include replacing primary EPS with basic EPS, eliminating the treasury stock method of accounting from fully diluted EPS, eliminating the three-percent test for dual presentation, and providing information on individual dilative securities.

=== U.S. GAAP ===
Calculations of diluted EPS under U.S. GAAP are described under Statement No. 128 of the Financial Accounting Standards Board (FAS No. 128). The objective of diluted EPS is to measure the performance of a company over the reporting period taking into account the dilutive effect of potential common stock that could be issued by the company. To compute diluted EPS, both the denominator (outstanding shares) and the numerator (earnings) may need to be adjusted.

Diluted shares: To calculate the total number of shares used in the calculation, FASB prescribes using the treasury method to calculate the dilutive effect of any instruments that could result in the issuance of shares, including:

- Stock options
- Stock Warrants
- Convertible preferred stock
- Convertible bonds
- Share-based payment arrangements
- Written put options
- Contingently issuable shares

Earnings: The numerator used in calculating diluted EPS is adjusted to take into account the impact that the conversion of any securities would have on earnings. For example, interest would be added back to earnings to reflect the conversion of any outstanding convertible bonds, preferred dividends would be added back to reflect the conversion of convertible preferred stock, and any impact of these changes on other financial items, such as royalties and taxes, would also be adjusted.

One way to consider the effect of dilutive instruments on EPS is to think about the "as if" method, in the sense that "if the instrument is converted, how does it affect EPS?" For example, let Company XYZ have net income = $2,000,000, there are 50,000 shares of common stock outstanding, and $1,000,000 of 10% bonds, convertible into 50,000 shares of common stock. Company XYZ's tax rate is 25%. Basic EPS = $2,000,000/50,000 = $40 Diluted EPS = ($2,000,000 + (25%*($1,000,000*10%))) / 50,000 + 50,000 = $20.25 Note that other than accounting for the shares of common stock added in the denominator of the EPS equation, we also add back the taxes that would have been taken out from net income if the bonds were not converted. In conclusion, the "as if" method is helpful in considering the effect on dilutive instruments on EPS because it helps us think about the overall effect rather than just thinking about the numerator and denominator of the equation separately.

=== International financial reporting standards ===
Under International Financial Reporting Standards, diluted earnings per share is calculated by adjusting the earnings and number of shares for the effects of dilutive options and other dilutive potential common stock. Dilutive potential common stock includes:

- convertible debt
- convertible preferred stock
- share warrants
- share options
- share rights
- employee stock purchase plans
- contractual rights to purchase shares
- contingent issuance contracts or agreements.

The earnings per share requirements of U.S. GAAP, FASB ASC 260: EPS, are a result of the FASB's cooperation with the IASB to narrow the difference between IFRS and US GAAP. A few differences remain.

The differences that remain are the result of differences in the application of the treasury stock method, the treatment of contracts that may be settled in shares or cash, and contingently issuable shares.

== See also ==
- Accretion/dilution analysis
- Dilutive security
- P/E ratio
- Whisper number
