= PSBank =

Bank in the Philippines

- Type: Public
- Traded as: PSE: PSB
- Industry: Finance
- Founded: 1959; 67 years ago, in Manila, Philippines
- Headquarters: Bonifacio Global City, Taguig, Philippines
- Key people: Vicente R. Cuna Jr. (chairman); Arthur V. Ty (vice chairman); Jose Vicente L. Alde (president and Director)
- Services: Banking
- Revenue: ₱20.23 billion ▼ (2020)
- Number of employees: 2,030
- Parent: Metrobank Group
- Website: psbank.com.ph

The Philippine Savings Bank, (Note: Also known in Hokkien Chinese: 全菲儲蓄銀行; Pe̍h-ōe-jī: Choân Hui Thí-thiok Gûn-hâng; & Mandarin simplified Chinese: 全菲储蓄银行; traditional Chinese: 全菲儲蓄銀行; pinyin: Quán Fēi Chúxù Yínháng)) commonly known as PSBank or abbreviated as PSB, is a savings bank based in the Philippines. It is a subsidiary of Metrobank and is the largest savings bank in the Philippines.

== Subsidiaries and affiliates ==
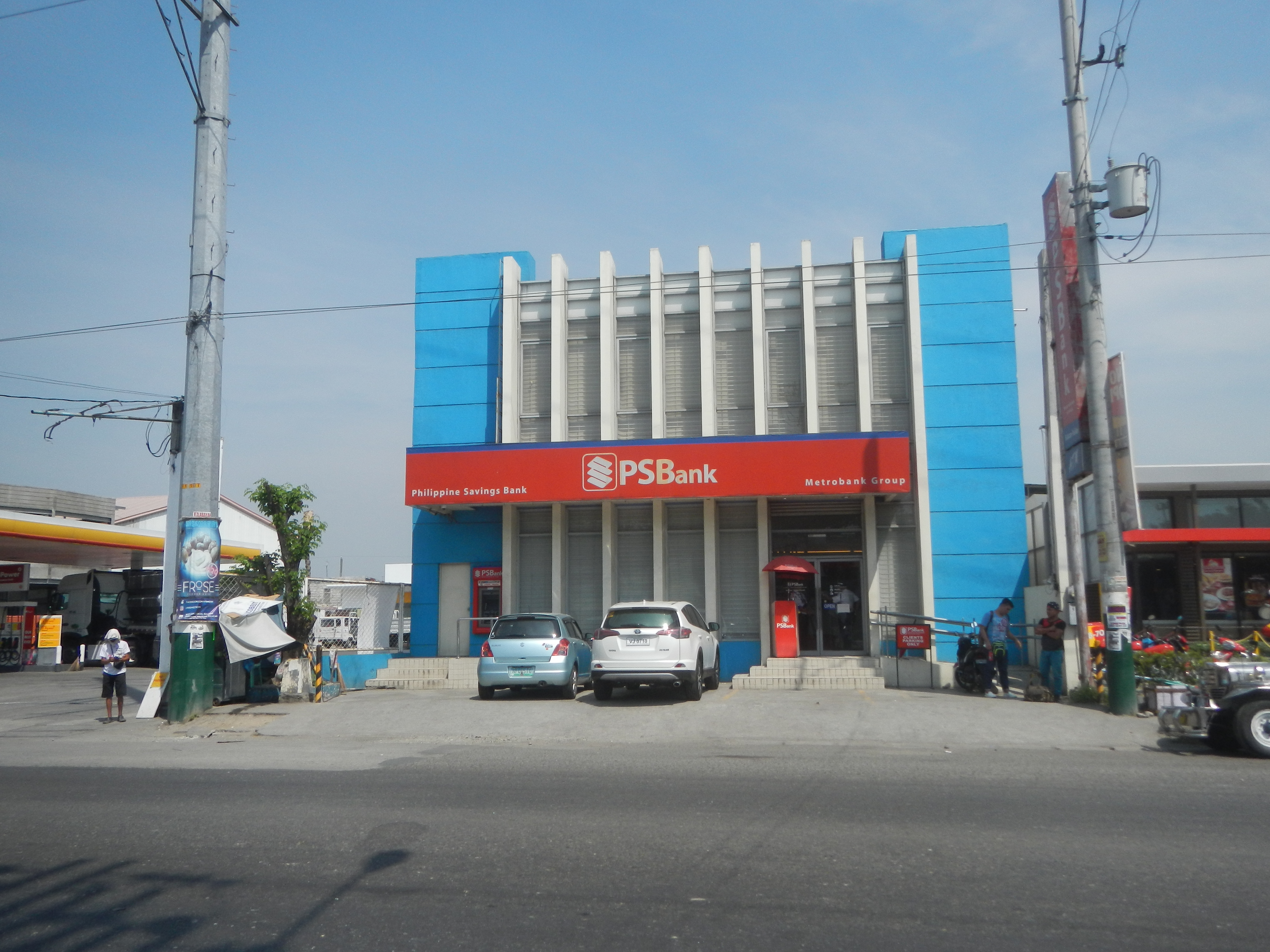
A PSBank branch in Pulilan, Bulacan

PSBank is a subsidiary of Metrobank, and as such is affiliated with it. PSBank is also affiliated with Toyota Financial Services Philippines Corporation (TFSPC), where it currently has a 25% stake.

== Ownership ==
- Metropolitan Bank and Trust Company: 75.98%
- PCD Nominee Corporation: 5.86%
- Danilo L. Dolor (son of Doña Soledad Dolor): 5.04%
- Erlinda L. Dolor: 2.95%
- Ma. Soledad S. de Leon: 1.67%
- Public stock: 4.01%

== Competition ==
PSBank competes with other savings banks, such as BPI Family Savings Bank and RCBC Savings Bank. The bank is also competing against multinational savings bank such as Citibank Savings and HSBC Savings. However, since PSBank is considered a major bank, it also competes with bigger financial institutions. It does not, however, aggressively compete with parent company Metrobank.

== Controversies ==
=== Impeachment of Renato Corona ===
In February 2012, PSBank officials were about to receive a subpoena request in connection with the Impeachment of Renato Corona due to the allegations of a secret US$ account under the name of Renato Corona. The PSBank executives were also asked to bring consumer identification and specimen signature card(s) of the bank account(s) under Corona's name which won ₱1 million in the PSBank Monthly Millions Raffle Promo.

=== Pork barrel case ===
During the senate investigations involving the Priority Development Assistance Fund scam, also known as the pork barrel scam, PSBank was one of the domestic banks included in the senate inquiry about the bank accounts of the whistleblowers. Moreover, the bank was included as one of the banks from which Senator Ramon Revilla Jr. and his family, as well as those of Janet Lim-Napoles and her pseudo-NGOs, have utilized to launder the controversial "pork barrel" funds.

== See also ==
- BancNet
- Metropolitan Bank and Trust Company
