= Swap ratio =

In corporate finance, the swap ratio is an exchange rate of the shares of the companies that undergo a merger; see Stock swap and Mergers and acquisitions § Stock.

The swap ratio determines the control that each group of shareholders of the companies shall have over the combined firm: essentially a function of the relative value of the strategic and financial results of the two companies. This ratio is thus calculated as a function of the valuation of the various assets and liabilities of the merging companies.

== See also ==
- Risk arbitrage
- Stock swap
- Junk bonds
- Accretion (finance)
- Contingent value rights
