= Metrobank (Philippines) =

Bank in the Philippines

- Metrobank Center along Bonifacio Global City, in Taguig.
- Native name: Chinese: 首都銀行; Pe̍h-ōe-jī: Siú-to͘ Gûn-hâng
- Type: Public
- Traded as: PSE: MBT
- Industry: Finance and insurance
- Founded: September 5, 1962; 64 years ago in Binondo, Manila, Philippines
- Founder: George Ty
- Headquarters: Metrobank Center, Bonifacio Global City, Taguig, Philippines
- Number of locations: 957 branches 2,345 ATMs
- Key people: Arthur V. Ty (chairman); Francisco C. Sebastian (vice chairman); Fabian S. Dee (president and CEO)
- Products: Consumer banking Corporate banking Insurance; Investment banking Mortgage loans Private banking Mutual fund Wealth management Credit card Finance lease
- Revenue: ₱121.9 billion (2020)
- Net income: ₱13.83 billion (2020)
- Total assets: ₱2.46 trillion (2020)
- Number of employees: ▲13,150 (2019)
- Subsidiaries: First Metro Investment Corporation; Metrobank Card; PSBank; Orix Metro Leasing and Finance Corporation; Axa Philippines
- Capital ratio: 17.5%
- Rating: Moody's: Baa2; Fitch Ratings: BBB-
- Website: www.metrobank.com.ph

The Metropolitan Bank & Trust Company, (Note: The company's article of incorporation states the company name using an ampersand instead of and. The variant using and is used in some instances including in some legal cases.) (Note: (Hokkien Chinese: 首都銀行; Pe̍h-ōe-jī: Siú-to͘ Gûn-hâng)) trading as Metrobank, is a Filipino bank that as of 2022, was the third largest bank in the Philippines in terms of total assets. It offers various financial services, from regular banking to insurance. It is the commercial and retail banking arm of GT Capital Holdings Inc.

The Metrobank Group has a combined network of over 800 local and international branches/offices, remittance offices and subsidiaries worldwide. It has 557 domestic branches and 32 offices overseas including in New York, Hong Kong, Tokyo, Osaka, Seoul, Pusan, Guam, Taipei, Kaohsiung, Madrid, Barcelona, Vienna, Rome, Bologna, Milan, Singapore, Chicago, Hawaii, and Shanghai.

== History ==
=== Foundation and early years ===
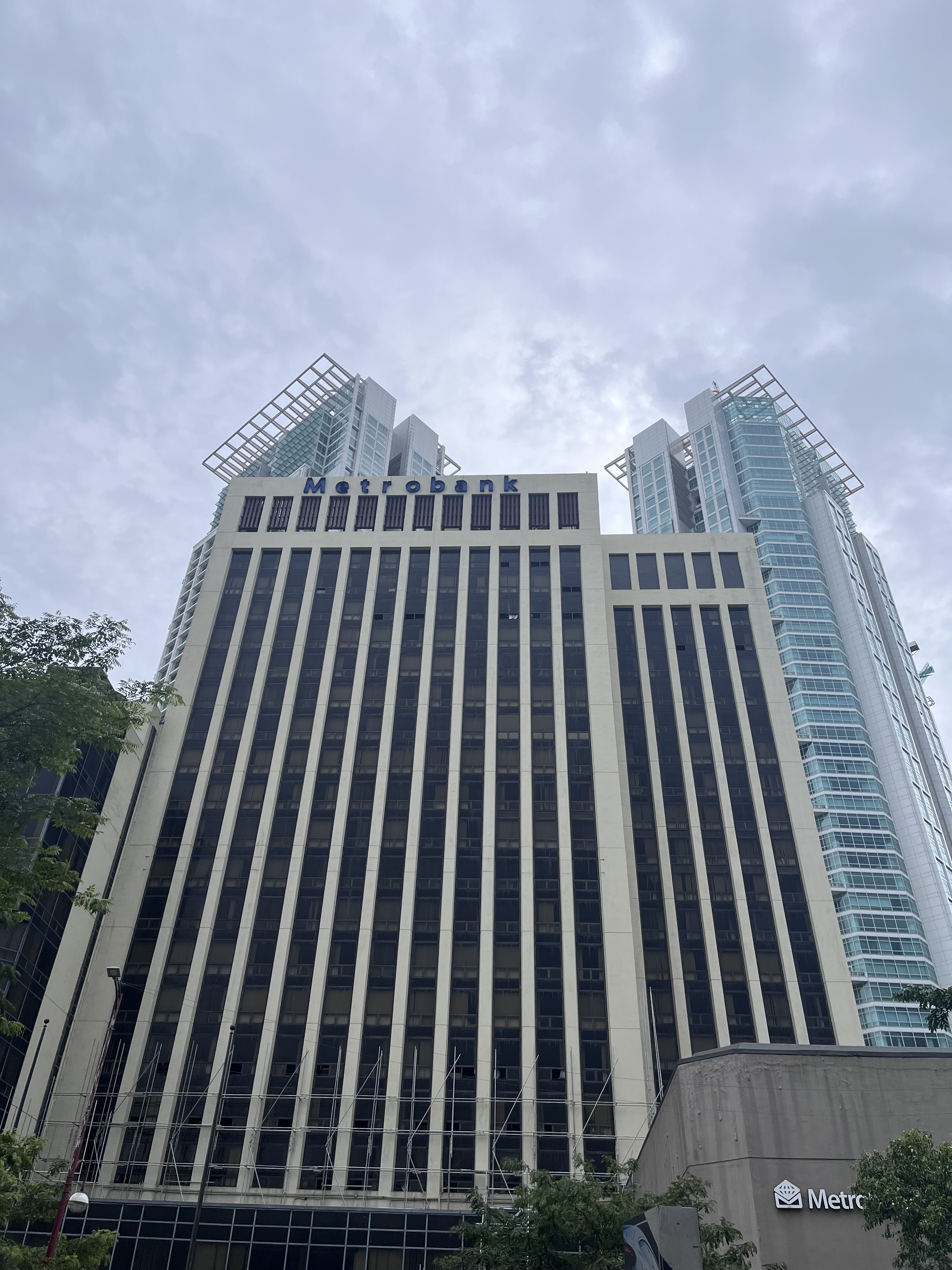
Metrobank Plaza in Makati, which once served as the bank's headquarters

Metropolitan Bank & Trust Company (Metrobank) was established by a group of businessmen on September 5, 1962, at the Lorenzo Ruiz Plaza corner Noberto Ty Street in Wellington Building Binondo, Manila. In August 1963, the bank's first branch was established in Divisoria. Four years later, Metrobank opened its first provincial branch in Davao. In the early 1970s, Metrobank opened its first international branch in Taipei, Taiwan's capital city.

In April 1977, the Central Bank of the Philippines authorized Metrobank to operate a foreign currency deposit unit (FCDU), either to exchange this (FCDU) for that Country Currency Gold Federal Reserves (Central Bank Gold Reserve) value in ratio with Philippine Gold Reserve or direct Currency Exchange with respect to the Gold Standards. In the same year, branches and offices totaled 100 and the bank inaugurated its new head office at Metrobank Plaza in Makati.

On August 21, 1981, the Central Bank authorized Metrobank to operate as a universal bank. Following, Metrobank entered the following ventures: the acquisition of majority ownership of Philippine Savings Bank (the second largest savings bank in the country at that time); the establishment of a joint travel agency venture with Thomas Cook Group in Thomas Cook Phils., Inc. in 1986; and establishing Toyota Motor Philippines with Toyota of Japan and Mitsui in 1988. Metrobank entered into joint ventures with Sumitomo Mitsui Banking Corporation of Japan to create Sumigin Metro Investment Corporation; with the National Mutual Holdings. of Australia to create Philippine Axa Life Insurance Corporation; and with the Orix of Japan to create Orix Metro Leasing and Finance Corporation.

=== 1982–2008: Growth ===
In September 1982, the number of Metrobank branches, offices and subsidiaries surpassed 200. A year later, Metrobank topped all private domestic banks in total resources, with ₱8.8 billion.

The bank had steady growth through the years. In September 1989, it increased its authorized capital stock from ₱2 billion to ₱5 billion. The bank's total capital funds on June 30, 2006 stood at P57.3 billion. Its consolidated resources amounted to ₱588.1 billion as of the same period. As of June 2007 assets reached ₱669.1 billion ($14.5 billion) (₱46=$1).

In 1990, alongside Chinabank, Citibank Philippines, RCBC and Security Bank, Metrobank become a founding member of BancNet.

In May 2000, Metrobank acquired Solid Banking Corporation (Solidbank) from a joint consortium led by the Madrigal family and Canada-based Bank of Nova Scotia (Scotiabank), with Metrobank as the surviving entity. as a result, all Solidbank branches along with Solidbank Mastercard will be merged with Metrobank, while most of Solidbank's remaining assets also merged with Metrobank's subsidiary, First Metro Investment Corporation.

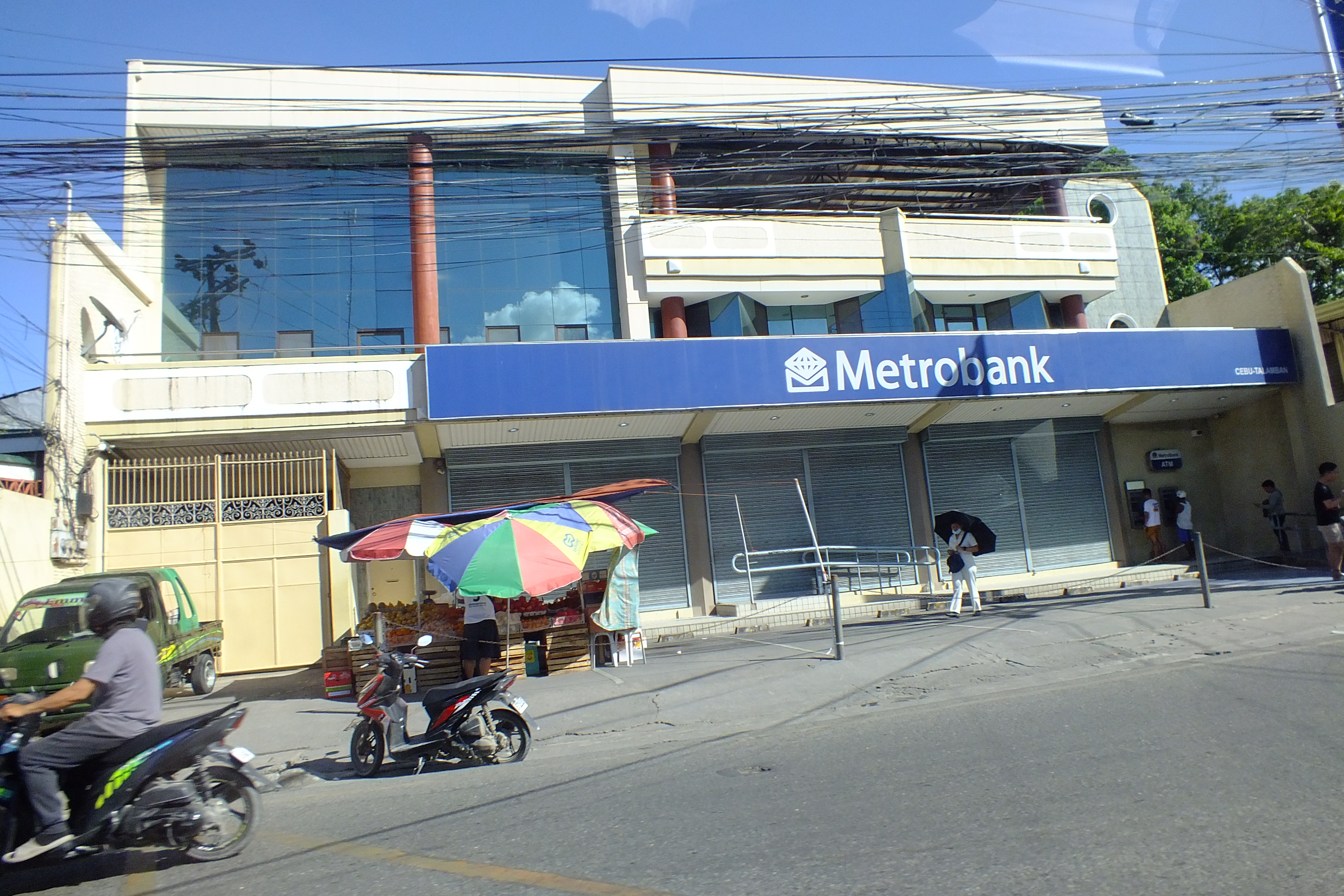
A Metrobank branch in Cebu City

Metrobank created or acquired a number of subsidiaries including Toyota Motor Philippines Corporation, Philippine Savings Bank, First Metro Investment Corporation, Metrobank Card Corporation, ORIX Metro Leasing and Finance Corporation, SMBC Metro Investment Corporation, First Metro Travelex (formerly Thomas Cook (Phils.), Philippine Axa Life Insurance Corporation, Mirant Global Corporation, Philippine Charter Insurance Corporation, MBTC Technology, Inc., Robert Browns Wear Inc (Moose Gear & Moose Girl Apparel), Toyota Financial Services Corporation, Toyota Cubao, Inc., Toyota Manila Bay Corporation, First Metro Securities Corporation, First Metro International Investment Co. Ltd., Metropolitan Bank (Bahamas) Ltd., MB Remittance Center Inc. (USA), Metro Remittance Singapore, Metro Remittance UK Limited, Metro Remittance (Italia) SpA, Metro Remittance S.A. (Spain) and MBTC Exchange Services GmbH (Austria).

==== Lehman collapse ====
On September 17, 2008, Bangko Sentral ng Pilipinas Governor Amando M. Tetangco Jr. announced Banco de Oro and Metrobank set aside provisions totalling $94.7 million to cover their exposure to the Lehman Brothers' collapse. Metrobank set aside $14 million in provisional funds, and it has $20.4 million worth of bonds issued by Lehman Brothers and ₱2.4 billion ($51.28 million) in loans to a Philippine-based subsidiary of the US investment bank. The BSP data revealed Metrobank has a Lehman Brothers exposure of $71 million, and it set aside a buffer equivalent to 70% of its exposure.

=== 2009–present: Australian investment and expansion ===
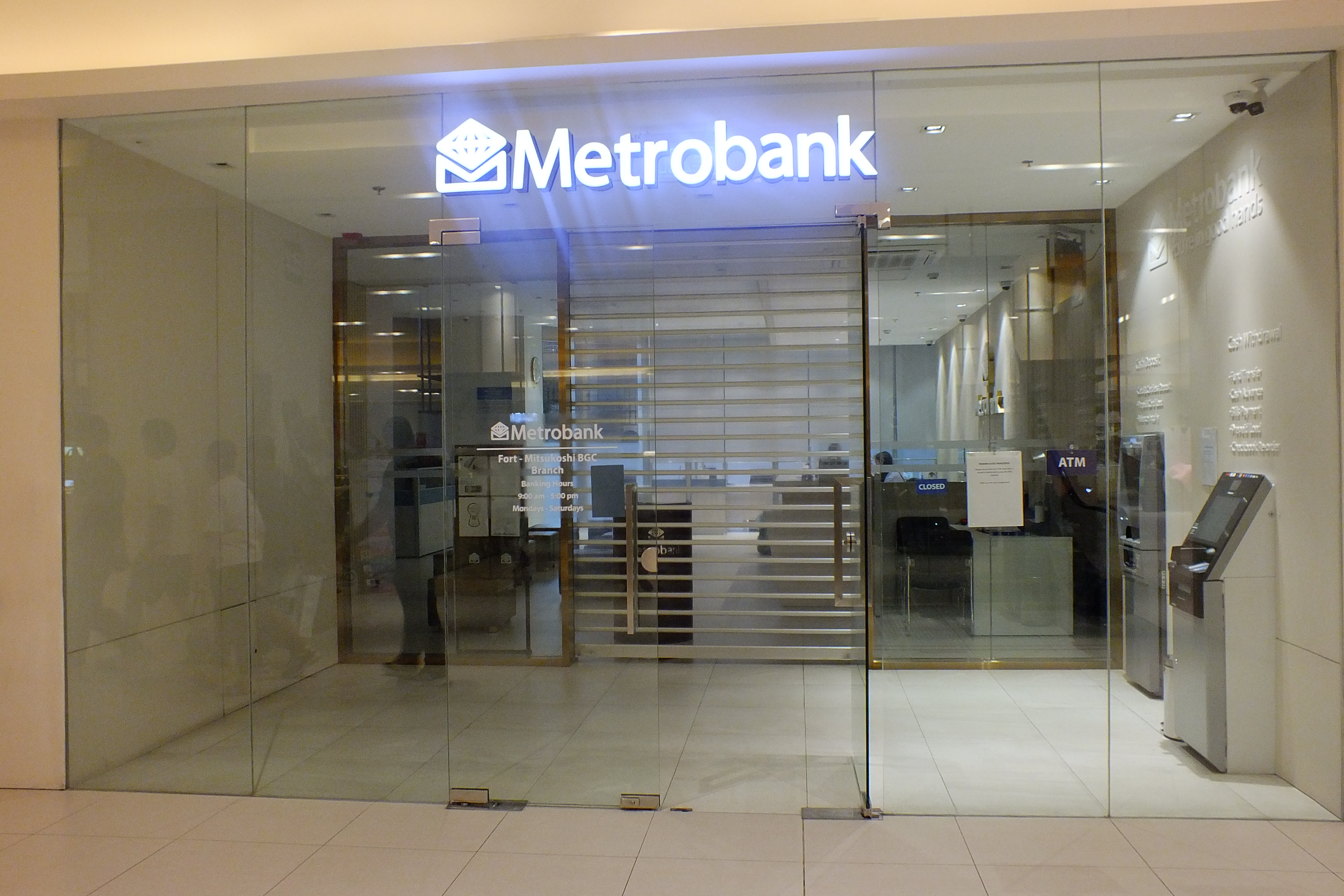
A Metrobank branch at Mitsukoshi BGC, Taguig

On September 28, 2009, Metrobank became the first local bank to offer a line of CNY denominated offerings.

In 2017, Metrobank made a deal with ANZ to increase its stake at Metrobank Card Corp. (MCC) from 60 percent to 100 percent. Metrobank's joint venture with ANZ was formed in 2003. Since then, MCC has become a leading provider of credit cards in the Philippines, with more than 1.5 million cards based from the data of the Credit Card Association of the Philippines (CCAP). MCC reported total assets of ₱60.4 billion and a return on average equity of 36.3 percent. MCC is also number one in terms of receivables based on CCAP data. ANZ, on their part, announced that they would sell half of their 40% stake at MCC for US$144 million and had an option to sell the remaining 20% stake to Metrobank on the same terms, which would be exercisable in the fourth quarter of the 2018 fiscal year.

In 2023, the bank announced that the Metrobank Plaza will be demolished and will be replaced by a modern skyscraper.

== Subsidiaries and affiliates ==
Metrobank is divided into the following subsidiaries and affiliates, which are listed depending on their location of operation:

=== Domestic subsidiaries and affiliates ===
- First Metro Investment Corporation
- First Metro Securities Brokerage Corporation
- First Metro Travelex
- Manila Doctors Hospital
- Manila Tytana Colleges (formerly Manila Doctors College)
- Metrobank Card Corporation (formerly Unibancard Corporation)
- Orix Metro Leasing and Finance Corporation
- Philippine Axa Life Insurance Corporation
- Charter Ping An Insurance Corporation
- Philippine Savings Bank
- SMBC Metro Investment Corporation
- Toyota Cubao Inc.
- Toyota Financial Services Philippines Corporation
- Toyota Manila Bay Corporation
- Toyota Motor Philippines Corporation
- Amorlaida Company
- Moose Gear and Moose Girl

=== International subsidiaries and affiliates ===
- First Metro International Investment Corporation Ltd. HK
- MBTC Exchange Service GmbH - Vienna
- MB Remittance Center HK
- Metro Remittance Center SA - Spain
- Metro Remittance (Italia) SpA
- Metro Remittance Singapore Pte Ltd
- Metro Remittance (UK) Limited

== Ownership structure ==
As of September 30, 2020, the following are the major stockholders:

No.	Company	Proportion in %
1	GT Capital Holdings, Inc.	37.15
2	PCD Nominee (non-Filipino)	23.34
3	PCD Nominee (Filipino)	22.98
Others		16.54

== Competition ==
Metrobank's main competitors in the retail banking business are SM-led BDO Unibank and Bank of the Philippine Islands (BPI) of the Ayala group. Other major competitors include state-owned Landbank, and LT Group-led PNB.

Apart from consumer banking, Metrobank is also well known in investment banking through its subsidiary, First Metro Investments Corporation, which competes with BDO Capital of BDO Unibank, and in securities trading through subsidiary First Metro Securities, which directly competes with BDO Securities (formerly BDO Nomura), BPI Wealth (formerly BPI Asset Management), and COL Financial.

== See also ==
- BancNet (the Metrobank ATM network)
- List of banks in the Philippines
