= Bong Tan (executive) =

Filipino businessman (1966 – 2019)

- Born: June 14, 1966
- Died: November 11, 2019 (aged 53); San Juan, Metro Manila, Philippines
- Education: University of California, Davis; Kellogg School of Management
- Occupations: Businessman; Basketball executive
- Known for: Owner of Tanduay Rhum Masters; UE Red Warriors basketball team coach
- Spouse: Julie C. Tan
- Children: Lucio III ("Hun Hun"), Kyle
- Parents: Lucio Tan; Carmen Khao
- Basketball career

Career history

Coaching
- 2019: UE

Lucio Khao Tan Jr. (June 14, 1966 – November 11, 2019), also known as Bong Tan, was a Filipino business executive and basketball coach. He was the son of Filipino-Chinese multimillionaire Lucio Tan.

== Education ==
In 1991, Tan graduated from the University of California, Davis with a Bachelor of Science degree in Civil Engineering. Tan also has a master's degree in Business Administration from the Kellogg School of Management Northwestern University.

== Business career ==
In October 2019, Tan was appointed as president of the PAL Holdings Inc., the holding company of his father's flag carrier Philippine Airlines Inc.

He was also director and president of Tanduay Distillers Inc. and Eton Properties Philippines Inc. and director and vice president of Fortune Tobacco Corp.

== Basketball career ==
=== Ownership ===
Tan owned the second reincarnation of the Tanduay in the PBA, then coached by Alfrancis Chua and led by Sonny Alvarado and Eric Menk. The team reached the Finals for its first conference as second reincarnation of the team, but lost to Formula Shell in six games. But after Sonny Alvarado's expulsion from the league and deportation, and Tan's statement about the league being an 'San Miguel league' (favoring San Miguel Corporation teams), the team sold its franchise after 3 years to the Lina Group.

Tan also owned Tanduay Light Rhum Masters in the PBA D-League, and he is the backer of the MPBL team Batangas City Tanduay Rhum Masters.

=== Coaching ===
After Joe Silva resigned as head coach, Tan assumed the position of head coach of the UE Red Warriors, while assistant and former team's head coach Lawrence Chongson served as his active consultant. The team finished dismal at the 7th place with 4–10 record.

== Coaching record ==
=== Collegiate ===
Season	Team	GP	W	L	PCT	Finish	PG	PW	PL	PPCT	Results
2019	UE	14	4	10	.286	7th	—	—	—	—	Eliminated
Totals		14	4	10	.286		—	—	—	—	0 championship

== Personal life ==
Tan married to Julie Tan and had two children: Lucio III ("Hun Hun") and Kyle.

Tan died at the Cardinal Santos Medical Center in San Juan, Metro Manila on November 11, 2019 after collapsing while in midday Saturday while playing in a recreational basketball game between Exile and Philippine Airlines at the Gatorade Hoops Center in Mandaluyong.
