= Philippine National Bank =

Banking company in the Philippines

- PNB Financial Center in Pasay
- Type: Stock, for profit publicly-held company
- Traded as: PSE: PNB
- Industry: Finance and Insurance
- Predecessors: Allied Bank; PNB Savings Bank
- Founded: July 22, 1916; 110 years ago Manila, Philippines
- Headquarters: PNB Financial Center, Macapagal Boulevard, Pasay, Philippines
- Key people: Lucio C. Tan (Chairman Emeritus); Edgar A. Cua (Chairman); Lucio C. Tan III (Vice Chairman); Edwin R. Bautista (President & CEO); Francis B. Albalate (CFO)
- Services: Financial services
- Operating income: ▼ ₱759.67 million (2020)
- Net income: ▲ ₱31.7 billion (2021)
- Total assets: ▼ ₱1.19 trillion (2021)
- Total equity: ▲ ₱161.22 billion (2021)
- Owner: LT Group
- Number of employees: 8,816 (As of FY2024)
- Website: pnb.com.ph

The Philippine National Bank (PNB, Filipino: Bangko Nasyonal ng Pilipinas; Spanish: Banco Nacional Filipino) is a major Filipino bank based in Pasay in the Philippines. It was established by the Philippine government on July 22, 1916, during the American Era.

The bank became the first universal bank in the Philippines in 1980 and was acquired by tycoon Lucio Tan after it was privatized by the government in 1989. After its merger with the Tan-owned Allied Bank on February 9, 2013, PNB became the fifth largest private domestic bank in the country.

As of 2023, PNB is the seventh largest bank in the Philippines by assets. It has 713 domestic branches and more than 1,400 ATMs. PNB has more than 70 overseas branches, representative offices, remittance centers and subsidiaries across Asia, Europe, the Middle East, and North America.

== History ==
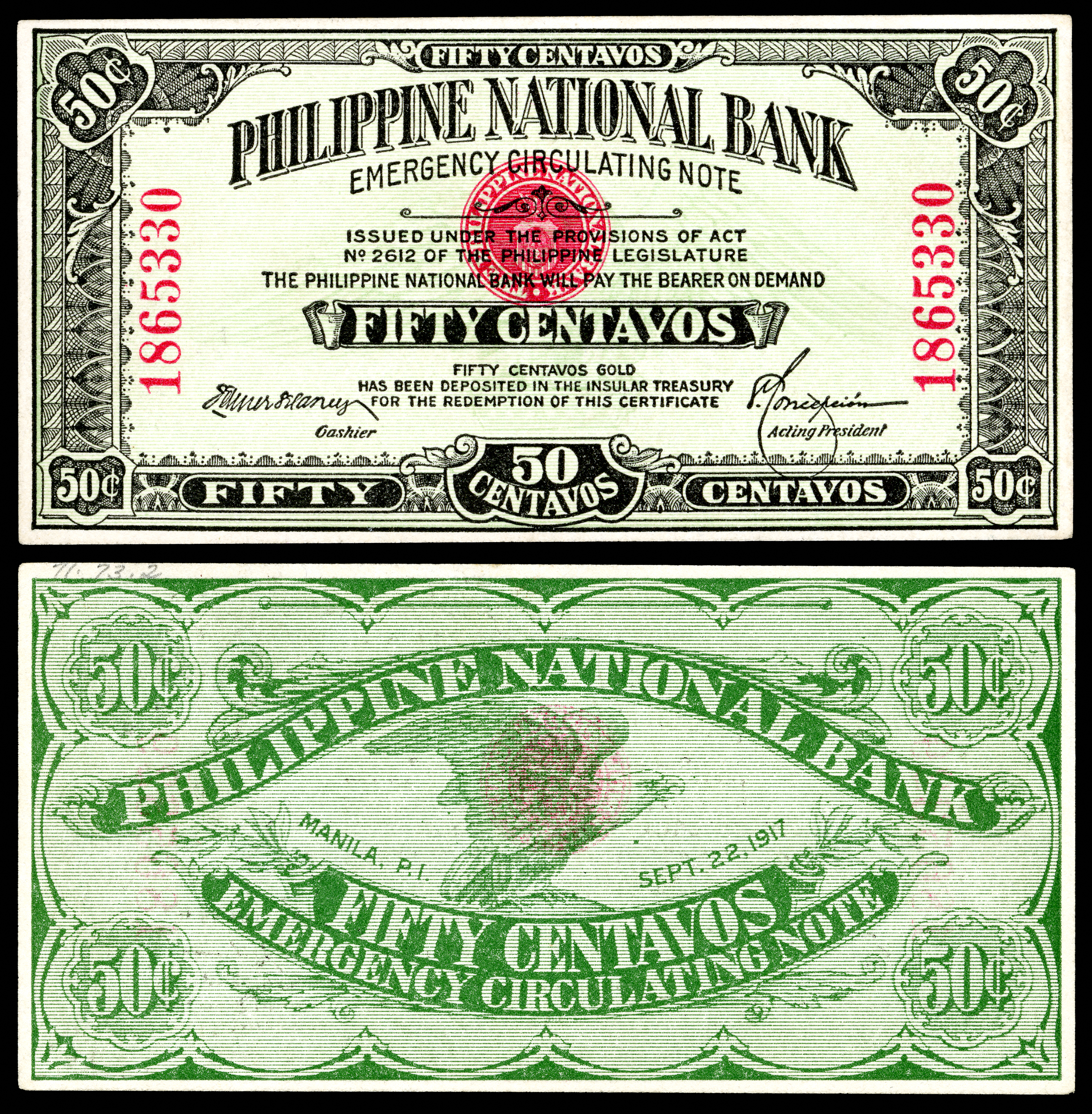
Philippine National Bank, 50 Centavos (1917). Emergency circulating note for World War I.

=== Early years ===
The Philippine National Bank was established as a government-owned banking institution on July 22, 1916. Its primary mandate was to provide financial services to Philippine industry and agriculture and support the government's economic development effort. World War I, then raging in Europe, generated huge demand for the country's major exports, namely sugar, copra, coconut oil, Manila hemp and tobacco. However, not much was being done to develop the industries that produced these sought-after crops since access to credit facilities was limited. To solve this problem, Henderson Martin, vice governor of the Philippines, together with Miguel Cuaderno (who later became Governor of the Central Bank) drafted a charter for a national bank.

On February 4, 1916, Public Act 2612 was passed by the Philippine Legislature providing for the establishment of PNB to replace the small ₱1,000,000 (equivalent to ₱494,826,983 in 2021) government-owned Agricultural Bank. PNB's first head office was the Masonic Temple along Escolta, Manila, the "Wall Street of the Philippines" then, in the bustling district of Santa Cruz in Manila. An American, Henry Parker Willis, was its first president.

With PNB's establishment, Filipinos had a bank of their own. PNB was authorized to grant short and long-term loans to agriculture and industry. Filipino farmers then could avail of loans with interest between 8% and 10% per annum. PNB was also authorized to receive deposits, open foreign credits and rediscount bills.

On July 24, 1916, PNB established its first branch outside Manila in Iloilo. In 1917, PNB opened its first non-Philippine branch in New York City, United States. The following year, it established five more domestic branches and another outside the Philippines in Shanghai, China.

In 1921, the national bank experienced near-bankruptcy due to mismanagement and weak American colonial structure. Due to the Wood-Forbes report, Venancio Concepcion, the bank's president, was indicted for corruption. The national bank's financial mess resulted in the 1921 financial crisis of the Philippines.

=== As the de facto central bank and national treasury ===
PNB has also functioned as the de facto central bank of the Philippines until 1949. It was given the special power to issue circulating notes.

PNB briefly ceased operations in January 1942, but reopened the next month under the supervision of occupying Imperial Japanese authorities. After the Second World War, PNB reopened immediately and acquired the assets and assumed the liabilities of the banking division of the [old] Central Bank of the Philippines.

With the establishment of the Central Bank in 1949, PNB ended its role as issuer of currency notes, custodianship of bank reserves, sole depository of government funds and clearing house of the banking system.

=== PNB investments ===
In 1955, it was authorized to operate as an investment bank with powers to own shares and to issue debentures. In 1963, it established the National Investment and Development Corporation to engage primarily in long-term and equity financing of business ventures.

PNB transferred to its new head office along Escolta in 1966 and launched the first on-line electronic data processing system in the Far East.

Between 1967 and 1979, PNB opened offices in London, Singapore, Jakarta, Honolulu and Amsterdam, and 14 provincial branches. It also started the Dollar Remittance Program.

In 1980, PNB became the first universal bank in the country. However, it encountered difficulties in the mid-80s as a result of the economic downturn triggered by the 1983 assassination of Senator Benigno S. Aquino Jr. and in 1986 it received assistance from the government.

For a while, the bank was headed by Roberto Benedicto, a classmate of President Ferdinand Marcos and crony capitalist heading the sugar industry monopoly, among other assests. He also owned Overseas California Bank in Los Angeles, California, along with Marcos. In 1990, Benedicto agreed to turn over ownership of that bank to the Philippine government in return for the latter dropping criminal racketeering and conspiracy charges against him. PNB bought the bank for $10 million and merged it into their Century Bank affiliate in Los Angeles.

=== Privatization ===
Privatization of PNB began on 21 June 1989 when 30% of its shares were offered to the public and it was listed on the Philippine Stock Exchange.

In 1992, PNB became the first Philippine bank to reach ₱100 billion in assets. Later that year, privatization continued with a second public offering of its shares.

In 1995, PNB moved to its headquarters to the PNB Financial Center, Central Boulevard (now Diosdado Macapagal Boulevard), Pasay. In 1996, the Securities and Exchange Commission approved the bank's new Articles of Incorporation and by-laws and the change in the status of PNB from a government-based to a private corporation with the control of the government reduced to 46%.

=== 21st century ===
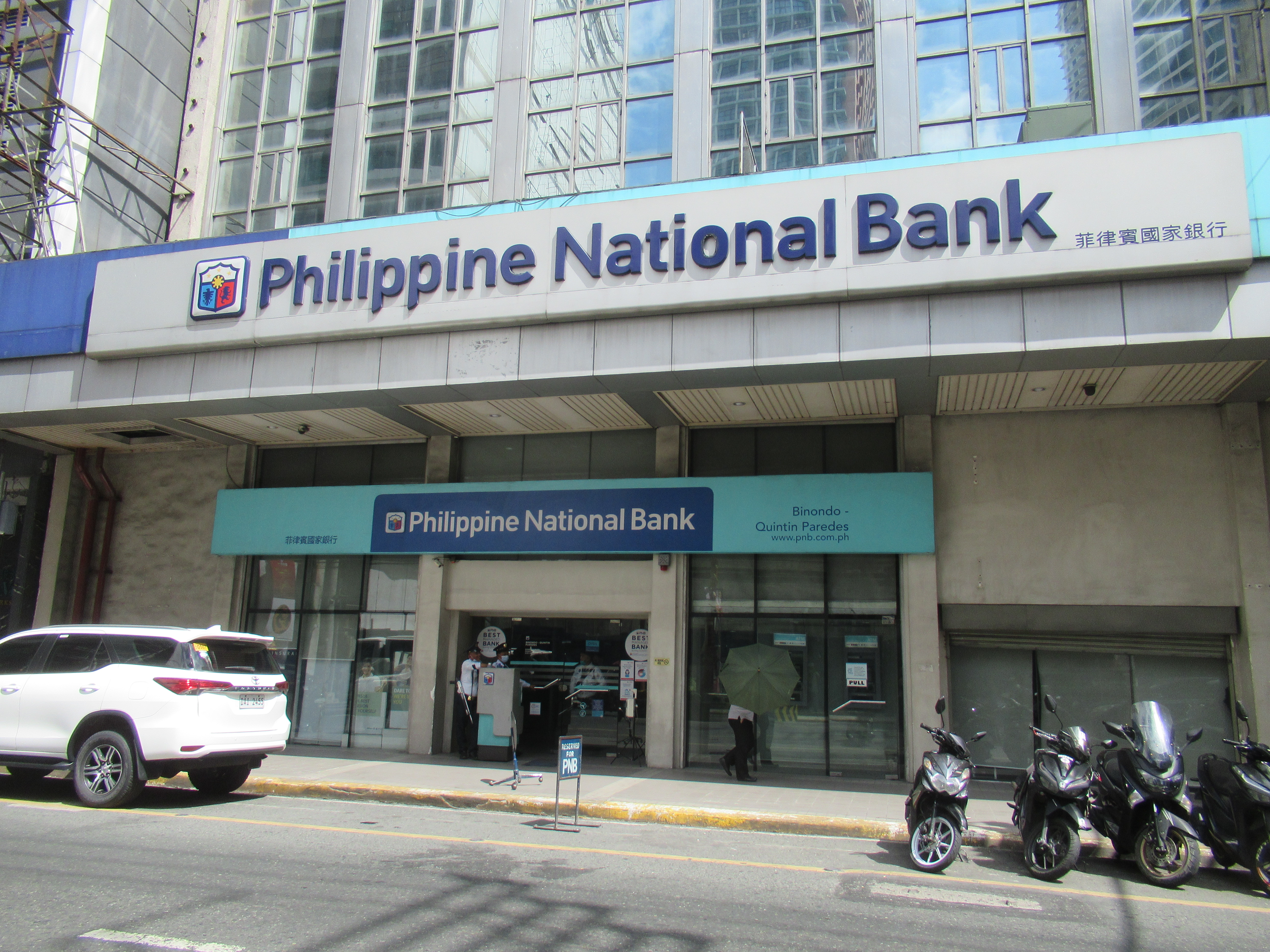
A PNB branch in Binondo, Manila

In early 2000, the Lucio Tan Group became the single biggest private stockholder. In less than one year, the group pumped nearly ₱20 billion of fresh capital into the bank. In late 2000, when PNB suffered huge withdrawals, mainly from the government accounts, the government provided ₱25 billion in financial aid.

In May 2002, the Philippine government and Lucio Tan signed an agreement to swap the government's loans to shares. The accord increased the government stake to 45% from 16% and reduced Tan's holding to 45% from 67%. Tan and the government also agreed that year to sell three-quarters of their combined stake within five years.

Also the same year, PNB hired 40-year old Lorenzo V. Tan as its youngest bank president. Following the senior management's Good Bank-Bad Bank strategy, PNB finally posted an income of ₱52 million (as restated from an earlier reported figure of ₱168 million, due to changes in Generally Accepted Accounting Principles) in 2003, after several years of being in the red. The bank was able to repeat this feat and reported an income of ₱353 million by end-2004.

In August 2005, PNB became fully privatized. The joint sale by the Philippine government and the Lucio Tan Group of the 67% stake in PNB was completed within the third quarter of 2005. The Lucio Tan Group exercised its right to match the ₱43.77 per share bid offered by a competitor and purchased the shares owned by the government. The completion of sale is expected to speed up the development of PNB's franchise and operational competitiveness.

Despite being fully privatized, PNB continued to be a government depository bank until May 3, 2007.

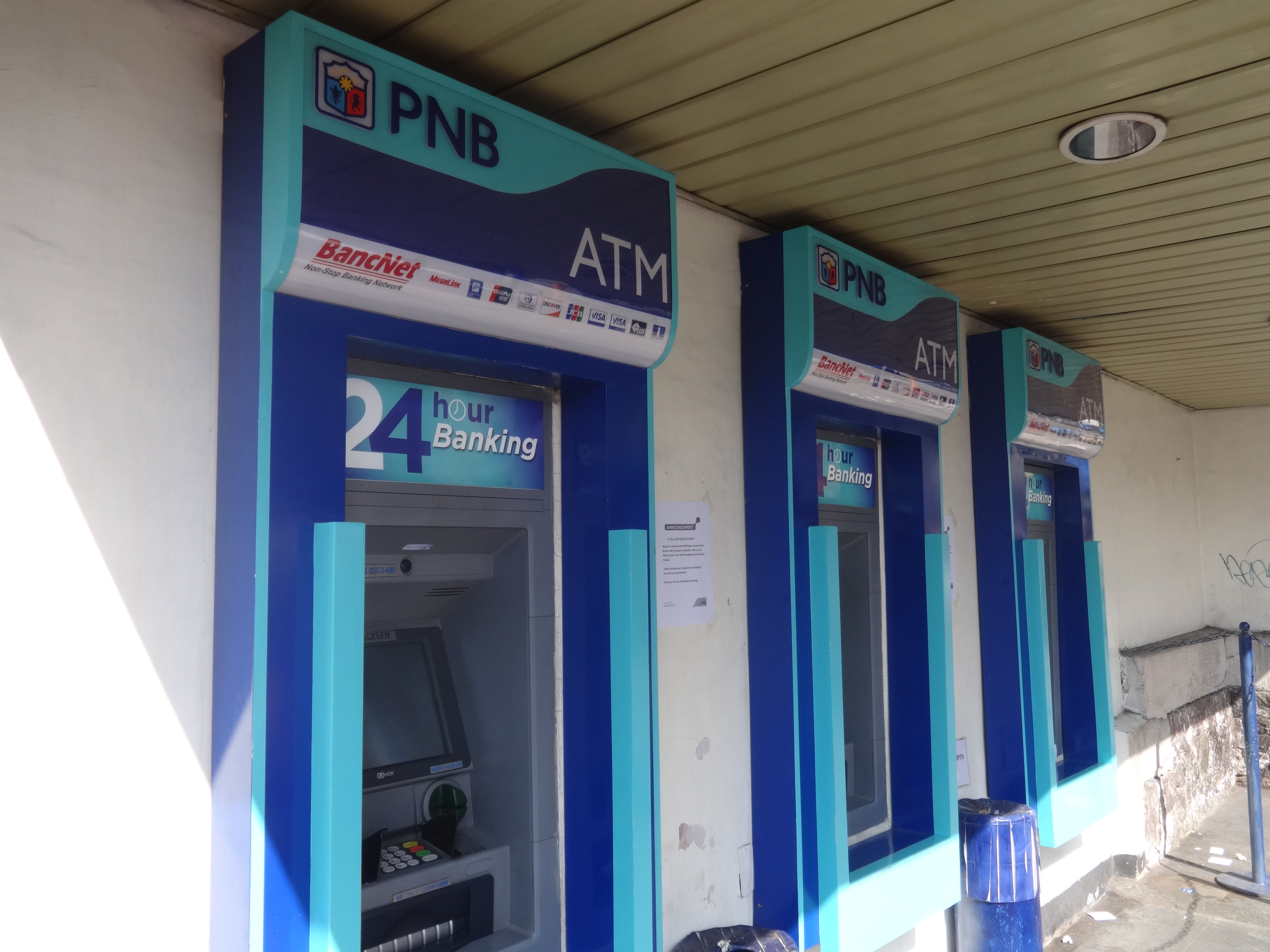
PNB ATMs in Baguio

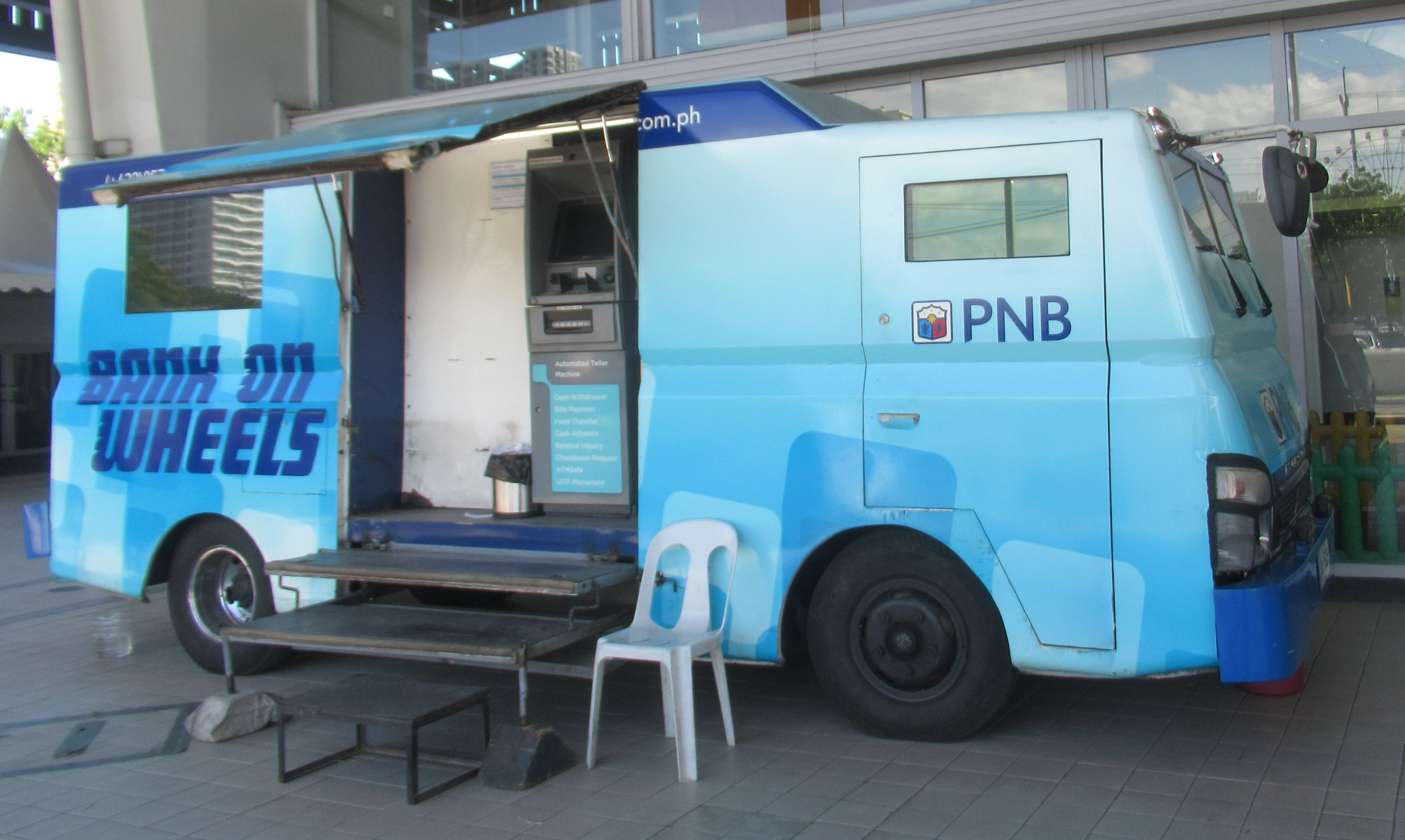
PNB-ATM on wheels

PNB currently has overseas remittance centers in the United States, Canada, England, Spain, the Netherlands, France, Germany, Austria, Italy, Hong Kong, Japan, Singapore, Malaysia, and countries in the Middle East.

PNB has also stepped up its marketing efforts to overseas Filipinos with its PNB Global Filipino Money Card.

Complementing PNB's banking activities are its subsidiaries like PNB General Insurers, a non-life insurance company; PNB Capital, an investment bank; PNB Securities, a stock brokerage outfit; and PNB Forex, which engages in foreign exchange trading. It also has a majority stake in PNB-Japan Leasing Corp. For life insurance requirements of PNB clients, it has a substantial equity stake in Beneficial PNB Life.

== Merger with Allied Banking Corporation ==
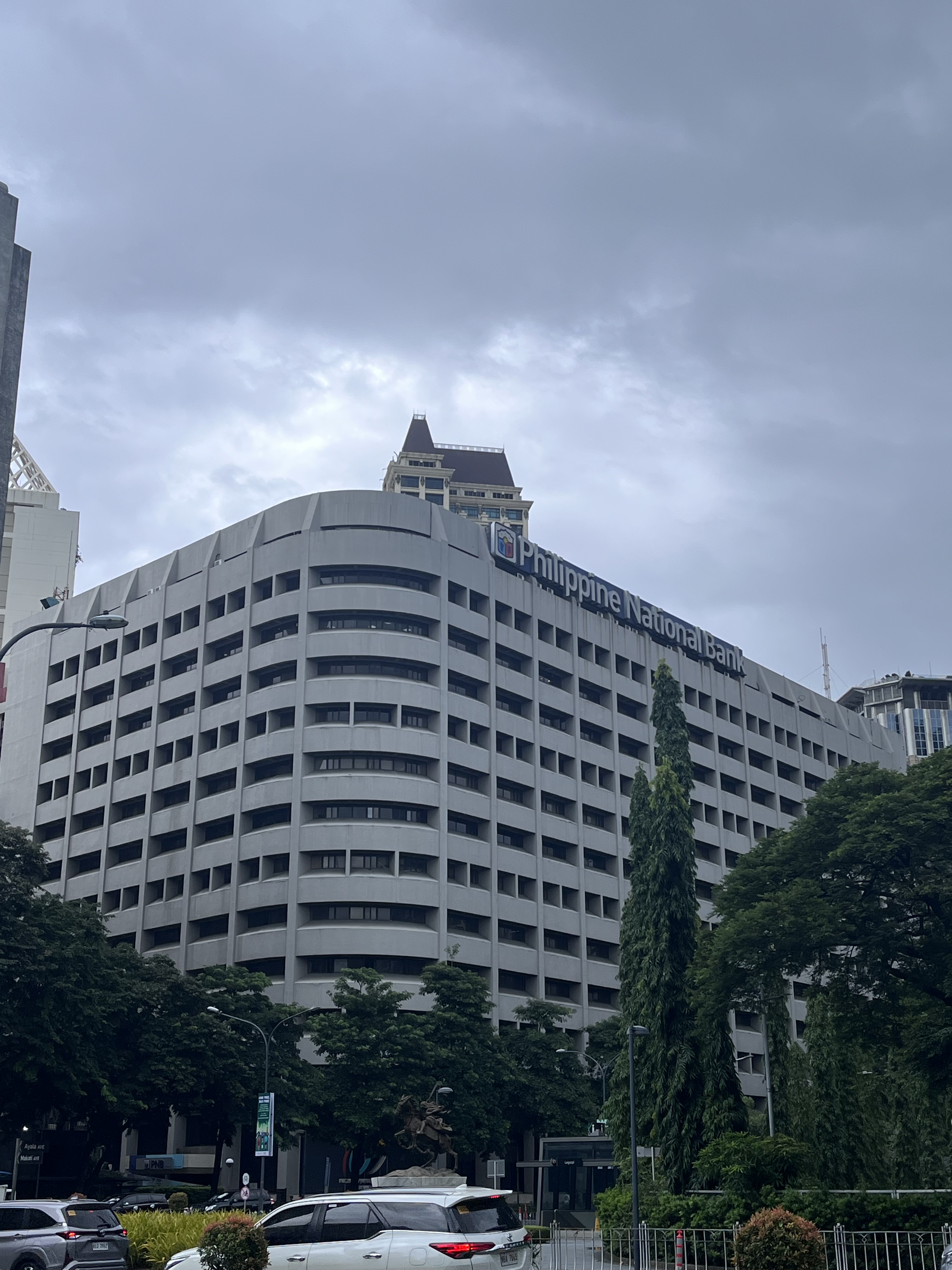
Allied Bank Center along Ayala Avenue in Makati used as PNB Makati Center, the bank’s secondary office.

On December 7, 2007, the Supreme Court of the Philippines affirmed a judgment dismissing the state's sequestration of Lucio Tan's companies: "There can be no question that indeed, petitioner's (the government's) orders of sequestration are void and have no legal effect." The landmark decision would trigger a planned merger between PNB and Tan's own Allied Banking Corporation. Edgar Bancod, research head at ATR-Kim Eng Securities, stated that the merged bank would become the country's fourth largest after Metrobank, Banco de Oro, and Bank of the Philippine Islands.

On December 12, 2007, official statements from PNB and Allied Bank confirmed the impending merger of both banks by early 2008. In August 2009, PNB and Allied Bank were expected to complete their merger within the next six to nine months after the latter sells its 28% stake in California-based Oceanic Bank. As of July 7, 2010, the remaining stumbling block to the merger was addressed, as the latter found a buyer for its minority stake in a California-based bank. The move was seen to pave the way for the merger.

On February 9, 2013, the PNB–Allied Bank merger was completed, with Philippine National Bank as the surviving brand. The merged bank became the fourth largest private domestic bank. Tarriela became chairman and Mier the chief executive of the merged bank until his retirement on May 27, 2014. He was replaced by Reynaldo Maclang as president and CEO until his own retirement on November 15, 2018. Jose "Wick" Veloso became president and CEO on November 16, 2018 until July 5, 2022, when he stepped down upon appointment as Government Service Insurance System (GSIS) president and general manager. His replacement, Florido P. Casuela, took office on April 25, 2023.

== Subsidiaries ==
Domestic

- Allied Integrated Holdings Inc. (AIHI)

Formerly PNB Savings Bank, which had been converted into a holding company on October 28, 2020 after PNB substantially acquired its assets and assumed its liabilities on March 1, 2020 and following the surrender of its thrift bank license to BSP on March 5, 2020. The SEC subsequently approved on February 23, 2021 its conversion from a savings bank to a holding company, the change in its corporate name, and the shortening of the company’s corporate life up to December 31, 2022. As a holding company, AIHI had been mainly tasked to manage the remaining real estate assets acquired by the former PNB Savings Bank. AIHI is now in the process of winding down its operations following the end of its corporate life by yearend 2022.

- PNB Capital and Investment Corporation (PNB Capital)

A wholly-owned subsidiary of the Bank that is licensed by the SEC to operate as an investment house with a non-quasi-banking license. It was incorporated on July 30, 1997 and commenced operations on October 8, 1997. Its principal business is to provide investment banking services which include debt and equity underwriting, private placement, loan arrangement, loan syndication, project financing and general financial advisory services, among others. PNB Capital is authorized to buy and sell, for its own account, securities issued by private corporations and the Philippine Government. PNB Capital distributes its structured and packaged debt and equity securities by tapping banks, trust companies, insurance companies, retail investors, brokerage houses, funds and other entities that invest in such securities. PNB Capital has arranged some of the largest loan syndications and award-winning deals in the Philippines. Likewise, it is very active in the capital market transactions in the country

- PNB Securities, Inc. (PNB SI)

a wholly-owned subsidiary which engages in the brokerage and dealership of the various common and preferred equities, REITs, ETFs and other equity-related securities listed in the Philippine Stock Exchange. PNB SI performs other equity related services including, but not limited to, the distribution of Initial Public Offerings in collaboration with PNB Capital, PNB branches, and the Bank’s Trust Banking Group and Wealth Management Group, block sales, private placements, tender offer agency and price stabilization agency as well as processing of dividend and pre-emptive rights entitlements in behalf of its clients. The company also collaborates with PNB Research in arranging corporate access for PNB SI’s foreign institutional clients. PNB SI also offers technical research studies as well as distributes PNB Research studies to inform and guide clients in making decisions with regard to their investments in the equities market.

- PNB-Mizuho Leasing and Finance Corporation (PMLFC)
- PNB-Mizuho Equipment Rentals Corporation (PMERC)

International

- Allied Banking Corporation (Hong Kong) Limited (ABCHKL)

Incorporated in 1978, ABCHKL is a private limited company and restricted-licensed bank under the Hong Kong Banking Ordinance. ABCHKL became a majority-owned (51%) subsidiary of PNB as a result of the merger of PNB and Allied Banking Corporation in 2013. ABCHKL provides a full range of commercial banking services such as deposit taking, lending and trade financing, documentary credits, participation in loan syndications and other risks, money market and foreign exchange operations. ABCHKL has a wholly-owned subsidiary, ACR Nominees Limited, which is a private limited company incorporated in Hong Kong that provides nonbanking general services to its customers. It is a Trust or Company Service Provider (“TCSP”) licensee in Hong Kong.

- Allied Commercial Bank (ACB)

Majority-owned (99.04%) subsidiary of PNB. Originally established in 1993 as Xiamen Commercial Bank, ACB maintains its head office in Xiamen, Fujian, China and has a branch in Chongqing which was established in 2003. ACB was previously allowed to deal only in foreign currency-denominated products and services, until 2017, when local currency or CNY denominated products and services were allowed except for local residents. In 2020, ACB finally obtained a banking license that allows offering services to all market segments with all traditional banking products, denominated in local or foreign currencies. ACB is a full-service commercial bank specializing in international trade finance and loans to micro, small and medium-sized industries/enterprises. Its deposit products are also varied and competitive. Last 2020, the Bank launched its enterprise internet banking system.

- PNB Global Remittance and Financial Company (HK) Limited (PNB Global HK)

Engaged in providing remittance services bound to the Philippines. It also grants consumer loans to Filipinos and foreign nationals working in Hong Kong who are interested to purchase real estate properties in the Philippines. PNB Global HK’s Main Office is in Wanchai District while its six branches are strategically situated in Shatin, Yuen Long, Tsuen Wan, North Point, and two in Worldwide House in Central District of Hong Kong.

- PNB International Investments Corporation (PNB IIC)

A non-bank holding company and the parent company of PNB Remittance Centers, Incorporated (PNB RCI). PNB RCI has a network of 18 branches engaging in money transmission in six states of the United States of America. PNB RCI owns PNB RCI Holding Company, Ltd., the parent company of PNB Remittance Company Canada (PNB RCC). PNB RCC has five branches and one sub-branch servicing the remittance requirements of Filipinos in Canada.

- Philippine National Bank (Europe) PLC (PNBE)

started in 1976 as PNB London Branch and was incorporated in June 1994. It was granted a deposit taking license by the Bank of England in July 1997. Following the merger of PNB and ABC in 2013, PNBE merged with Allied Bank Philippines (UK) Plc in 2014, with the former as the surviving entity. PNBE is an authorized institution under the Financial Services Act 2012 and is regulated by the Financial Conduct Authority (FCA) and Prudential Regulation Authority (PRA). Following the conclusion of the Brexit transition period in 2020, PNBE continues to provide services to Filipinos in the region through its UK office as well as its web and phone remittance platforms

== Employee unions ==
In Japan, employees of the PNB Tokyo branch are represented by the labour union Tozen.

== See also ==
- Allied Banking Corporation
- Department of Finance
