= Ynchausti y Compañía =

Conglomerate based in the Philippines

- Type: Private
- Industry: Ship chandler, sugar production, banking
- Founded: 1816
- Founder: Jose Antonio de Ynchausti, Jose Joaquin de Ynchausti
- Defunct: 1936
- Fate: Divested to other companies
- Successors: Elizalde & Company (Note: Defunct company with divisions now owned by various companies such as LT Group now owning Tanduay Distillers and Cemex Philippines owning Rizal Cement.)
- Headquarters: Manila, Philippines
- Area served: Philippines, Spain

Ynchausti y Compañía (Ynchausti and Company, also known as YCO) was a prominent Philippine conglomerate from 1816 to 1936. In 1936, the Ynchausti family completed the divestment of most of their corporate holdings with the intention of adopting a less visible business profile.

The company was founded, majority owned, and led by the Ynchausti family for the entirety of its operations. Its primary lines of business during operation included banking, shipping, sugar production and trade, two distilleries (alcohol production), abaca production and trade, insurance, and real estate. It also figured prominently in infrastructure development during the 19th century.

The company was likely the first Philippine-owned multi-national conglomerate and, as a result, is one of the Philippine's most storied and influential industrial groups of its time. At the height of its operations, the company maintained offices in Manila, Iloilo City, Hong Kong, Shanghai, Tokyo, New York, and San Francisco. A number of the businesses whose beginnings involved Ynchausti y Compañia, or members of the Ynchausti family, remain active in the Philippines today.

== Inception ==
One of the major Spanish trading companies of the 18th century was the Real Compañía Guipuzcoana de Caracas (Royal Guipuzcoan Company of Caracas). This company began in operations in 1728 and lasted until 1785, when their royal charter was withdrawn. The company held the monopoly on trade between Spain and Venezuela, through various ports in Spain, the Basque Country, and Venezuela. Many of the owners were Basques, from the province of Gipuzkoa. In 1785, with the lapsing of its royal decree, the company was reformed by its owners into the Real Compañía de Filipinas (Royal Company of the Philippines). With the formation of the Real Compañía de Filipinas, traders began making the journey to the Spanish colony. Concurrent with the influx of new traders and businessmen was the addition of foreign capital and expertise. For centuries, the Philippines was a relatively sleepy colony. The 19th century saw a dramatic economic boom in the Philippines, driven in part by the Real Compañía de Filipinas.

Among the Basque traders was José Antonio de Ynchausti. He was a ship-owner and captain from Gipuzkoa who originally plied the trade waters between Spain and Venezuela. With his son, José Joaquín de Ynchausti, he established a presence in the city of Manila. The first company, J. J. Ynchausti y Compañía, was founded in 1816. Its primary line of business was ship chandlery, though it was also involved in general trade operations.

Over time, José Joaquín de Ynchausti became a prominent, well-respected, and connected businessman. Eventually he played a role in the politics of the day, sitting on a number of high profile advisory councils. He was involved in the Assembly of Reformists, a body composed of Filipinos who made recommendations for reforms in the Philippines to the Spanish crown. He was an influential figure during his time and instrumental in laying the foundation for the economic future of Ynchausti y Compañía and his family.

== 19th century: Puente Colgante and beyond ==
Ynchausti y Compañía maintained offices and holdings on both sides of the Pasig River. In the 1840s, a decision was made by the Spanish government to develop much needed infrastructure and Ynchausti y Compañía was awarded the franchise to construct the Puente Colgante soon after. This bridge spanned the Pasig River and connected the Binondo area (Muella de la Industria where the headquarters and warehouses of Ynchausti y Compañía were located) and Intramuros (the original walled city of Manila). The bridge was designed and built by Matias Menchacatorre y Compañía, a Spanish-Basque engineering firm.

The original name of the bridge was Puente de Clavería, named after the Governor-General of the Philippines Narciso Clavería (a Basque from San Sebastián, Gipuzkoa). However, because of its modern and unique design it became more commonly known as the Puente Colgante, or Hanging Bridge. This bridge is notable because it was the first steel suspension bridge in Asia, and one of the first in the world. Construction on it began in 1849 and was completed in 1852. Tolls from pedestrian and carriage use of the bridge was an important, early source, of income from Ynchausti y Compañía.

The Puente Colgante was a visible sign of the affluence and influence of the Ynchausti family. By 1854, Ynchausti y Compañía began to expand its interests and scope. José Joaquín de Ynchausti was one of the founding members, director, and primary stockholder of Banco Español-Filipino de Isabel II (presently, the Bank of the Philippine Islands).

The Tanduay Distilery and Hagonoy Distillery were also founded by the Ynchausti family, in cooperation with Valentín Teus e Yrissary (who was a trusted agent, manager, and minority shareholder in Ynchausti y Compañía). Tanduay became one of the most decorated Philippine companies of the 19th century, winning numerous international awards for its rum. Tanduay, now owned by the LT Group, remains a popular beverage manufacturer. Famously, the most prominent example of Tanduay's roots is that every bottle of rum still carries the Ynchausti family crest even today. While there have been stories to the contrary, such as the logo being 'made up', the truth is that the Ynchausti family used their coat of arms for Tanduay's logo.

Additional interests of Ynchausti y Compañía were in sugar, abaca production, paints (YCO Paints and YCO Floor Wax) and shipping. By the late 19th century Ynchausti Shipping was the largest inter-island shipping company in the Philippines. Ynchausti y Compañía was one of the largest sugar producers as well, becoming the largest during the 1900s. Among its sugar assets was the famed sugar central, La Carlota. Almost all of its sugar assets were located in Negros. It was the only domestic owned company that was the equal, or greater, in terms of production as foreign sugar companies. It also spearheaded the development of Manila hemp (abaca) rope, becoming the single-largest producer in the Philippines. In Manila, it owned vast amounts of land, specifically along what was known as Calle Real (Roxas Boulevard today).

José Joaquín de Ynchausti died in 1889, leaving management of the firm to his two sons, Rafael and Joaquín José. José Joaquín also had a daughter, Clotilde, who married a prominent Manila-based French businessman by the name of Arturo Vidal Sáenz, eventually settled in France.

Under the dual management of the siblings Rafael and Joaquín José, Ynchausti y Compañía expanded its interests throughout the Philippines, becoming the largest conglomerate of its day. They successfully shepherded it through the Philippine Revolution, supporting the First Philippine Republic by buying war bonds and paying taxes. The brothers were also able to successfully navigate the early American colonial era, maintaining the company's status as a major economic force. Starting in the mid-19th century and continuing until the company was dissolved, the Ynchausti brothers were supported by their professional managers and minority shareholders, and lawyers.

Two prominent Philippine families got their start either working for the Ynchausti family or as employees and (later) stockholders of Ynchausti y Compañía. These are the Araneta family (Gregorio Araneta and his son Salvador Araneta were trusted personal and corporate lawyers and acted as agents representing the interests of the family) and the Elizalde family. Members of the Elizalde family migrated to the Philippines to act as managers in Ynchausti y Compañía.

== The 20th century: Growth and divestment ==
The early portion of the 20th century saw the Ynchausti family adjusting to the new colonial leadership under the United States of America; it was not without its difficulties. However, they were able to adjust and expand their asset base. From 1900 until 1920, the company continued its Philippine industrial dominance. When the United States reviewed the Philippines in 1898, they identified two major companies: Tabacalera and Ynchausti y Compañía.

In 1915, Rafael de Ynchausti died. He was survived by two daughters: Angelina and María de la Consolación (Consuelo). Angelina married José McMicking Sr, then the Sheriff of Manila. Among their children was José Rafael McMicking de Ynchausti (later known as Joseph "Joe" R. McMicking). He married Mercedes Zóbel de Ayala, of the venerable Zóbel de Ayala clan. Starting with an initial investment in Ayala y Compañía (precursor of Ayala Corporation) in the post-World War II reconstruction years, McMicking eventually became the primary shareholder of Ayala y Compañía, as well as the intellectual force and guiding light behind Ayala's rapid growth in the 20th century. He conceptualized the development of Makati, as well as the famous residential development Sotogrande in Spain. Through his efforts, Ayala became one of the country's largest and most important conglomerates, a reputation it still maintains today.

Consuelo de Ynchausti married Ignacio R. Ortigas. Their descendants became majority shareholders in Ortigas & Company, one of the Philippine's oldest and most prominent real estate developers. Among Ortigas & Company's assets and developments are the famous Greenhills Shopping Center and Ortigas Business District.

After Rafael's death, Joaquín José de Ynchausti took over management of Ynchausti y Compañía. He came to rely on the Elizalde family for assistance in managing the firm's vast assets. In 1920 he embarked on a world trip. First, he traveled to Colorado in the United States to acquire a railway system from Baldwin Locomotive Works. The system he acquired was installed in the company's sugar centrals in Iloilo to help in transporting agricultural production. After that he journeyed to Spain to see his son, Manuel, who was studying law at the University of Madrid. Sadly, Joaquín José died of a heart attack at the Ritz-Carlton in Madrid.

Manuel de Ynchausti, born in 1900, was Joaquín José's only surviving son. As a result, he was the heir apparent of Ynchausti y Compañía. However, because of his youth (he was only twenty at the time of his father's death) managerial control was instead entrusted to members of the Elizalde family until he came of age. By 1927, Manuel felt it was time to become more active. He completed his law studies at the University of Madrid and married a young Basque woman from San Sebastián, Ana Belén Laurrari. They returned to Manila and settled in the family's ancestral home along Calle Real. But, by that time he found it difficult to become involved because of certain internal corporate issues. Spurred by those issues, as well as changing global economic conditions, Manuel made the difficult decision to divest Ynchausti y Compañía of certain partners and some of its industrial assets, among them Ynchausti Shipping, Tanduay, YCO Paints and Floor Wax, Rizal Cement, and their sugar interests. The Rizal Cement factory, located in Binangonan, Rizal, was established in 1924 and was the first cement factory in the Philippines. It was sold to Vicente Madrigal. The Elizalde family acquired Tanduay, YCO Paints and Floor Wax, and some of the sugar interests. Around this asset base they formed Elizalde & Company, Inc. in 1936.

Ynchausti y Compañía continued under the leadership of Manuel M. de Ynchausti, albeit with a much lower profile than before. The proceeds from the divestment of Ynchausti y Compañía were distributed among the various Ynchausti family members, eventually funding their own business enterprises. On a personal level, Manuel became noted for his humanitarian efforts in the Philippines and in aid of Basque refugee women and children during the Spanish Civil War and World War II. Most notably for the Philippines, in the 1920s he turned over thousands of hectares of land in Negros to the farmers and tillers who worked the land and to the Roman Catholic Church (primarily the Capuchin Order). He was awarded the Knighthood of Saint Gregory by Pope Pious XI in 1927 in recognition of his social outreach efforts.

In reviewing the importance of Ynchausti y Compañía and the Ynchausti family, Alejandro R. Roces, Philippine National Artist for Literature, wrote: "The economic impact of the Ynchausti family becomes readily apparent when studying the family tree and history. They were an entrepreneurial clan that also balanced humanitarian considerations. Their humanitarian legacy, as much as the economic, is something well-worth remembering for this historic Filipino family."
