= Asia Brewery =

Philippine brewery

Coordinates: 14°33′24″N 121°01′17″E

Asia Brewery, Inc.
- Type: Subsidiary
- Founded: January 17, 1852; 174 years ago January 27, 1982; 44 years ago
- Founder: Lucio C. Tan, Sr.
- Headquarters: Makati, Philippines
- Area served: Philippines
- Key people: Lucio C. Tan, Sr. (Chairman); Michael G. Tan (President)
- Products: Beer, Alcomix, Non-Alcoholic Beverages
- Parent: LT Group, Inc.
- Website: asiabrewery.com

Asia Brewery, Inc. is a Philippines-based diversified beverage company owned by LT Group, Inc. (PSE: LTG), a publicly listed holding company of Lucio Tan.

== History ==
Asia Brewery, Inc. was established by Lucio Tan on January 27, 1982, with the inauguration of its brewery in Cabuyao, Laguna and the launch of its first brand, Beer Hausen Pale Pilsen. This was followed by Max Premium beer in 1983, Manila Beer in 1985, and Beer Pale Pilsen in 1988. Beer Pale Pilsen (now, Beer Na Beer) was launched with much controversy.

By 1992, the company inaugurated its second brewery at El Salvador, Misamis Oriental with a capacity of 2 million hectoliters of beer per annum. It also began diversifying its product line with the introduction of bottled water (Summit and Absolute), iced tea drinks (Pacific Sun), sport drinks (100Plus Isotonic Drink and Cobra Energy Drink) and alcoholic mixes (Tanduay Ice and Tanduay Black “alcomixes”). The company is also looking into expanding into the international market.

== International brands ==
The company currently brews Colt 45 (under license) and distributes Asahi Super Dry beers. It was previously a licensee brewer of Carlsberg (1987), Budweiser (1997), Lone Star (1999), Coors Original (2007) and Coors Light (2007) beers. In May 2016, the company announced it signed an agreement with Heineken International to establish a new venture (AB Heineken Philippines, Inc.) that will brew and distribute Heineken brands. The company also announced it will begin distributing Heineken and Tiger Beer.

In 2007, the company became the Philippine bottler of Virgin Cola, through its subsidiary, InterBev Philippines, Inc. until the closure of Virgin Cola.

In 2011, the company acquired Philippine distribution rights for Vitamilk soy milk from Thailand's Green Spot Company Ltd., with an option to manufacture the product under a joint-venture agreement given certain sales milestones. The following year, the company announced the establishment of AB Pascual Foods, a joint-venture with Spanish dairy company Grupo Leche Pascual (renamed as Calidad Pascual in 2014) to enter the yogurt market. The venture will initially import Creamy Delight yogurt with the intention of putting up a yogurt manufacturing facility in the Philippines in two to three years.

In March 2014, the company announced it had acquired the license to manufacture and distribute the ready-to-drink version of Nestea, taking over from Coca-Cola Bottlers Philippines, Inc. (now Coca-Cola Europacific Aboitiz Philippines).

== Breweries ==
- Eton City, Cabuyao, Laguna
- El Salvador City, Misamis Oriental

== Products ==
Beer:

- Asahi Super Dry – distribution
- Heineken - distribution (formerly known as Carlsberg – under license)
- Tecate - distribution
- Tiger Beer - distribution (formerly known as Coors Original and Coors Light – under license)
- Leon Extra Strong Beer (formerly known as Colt 45 malt liquor – under license)

Alcomix:

- Tanduay Ice (flavored vodka)
- Tanduay Ice Signature (flavored vodka)
- Soju Bomb
- AB Origins Yuzu Highball
- Pacific Sun Hard Iced Tea

Non-alcoholic:

- Absolute Distilled Drinking Water
- Summit Still Water
- Summit Sparkling Water
- Summit Natural Drinking Water
- C-vitt – under license from House Foods (formerly known as Feelgood (juice drink))
- Cobra Energy Drink
- Cobra Rise Energy Drink
- Nestea (ready-to-drink) - under license and joint-venture from Nestlé Philippines (formerly known as Pacific Sun (iced tea drink))
- Sunkist Zero Sugar (formerly known as Sunkist Carbonated Juice) - under license

Dairy:

- Vitamilk Soy Milk – distribution
- Pascual Creamy Delight Yogurt
- Pascual Greek Style Yogurt Drink

Discontinued:

- Beer Pale Pilsen/Beer na Beer (BnB Pale Pilsen)
- Beer na Beer Strong
- Colt 45 malt liquor – under license (replaced with Leon Extra Strong Beer since 2024)
- Beer Hausen Pale Pilsen
- Max Premium Beer
- Stag Pale Pilsen
- Admiral Beer
- Q Shandy
- Colt Ice
- Pacific Sun (iced tea drink) (replaced with Nestea ready-to-drink since 2013)
- Feelgood (juice drink) (replaced with C-vitt since 2023)
- Summit Vitamin Water
- Summit Clear/Summit Zero Cal
- Carlsberg – under license (replaced with Heineken - distribution since 2016)
- Labatt's Ice - under license
- Lone Star – under license
- Lone Star Light – under license
- Lone Star Ultra – under license
- Budweiser – under license
- Virgin Cola In Color Red – under license
- Virgin Cola Light In Color White/Red – under license
- Virgin Lemon-Lime In Color Blue and Green - under license
- Virgin Cloudy Orange In Color Orange and Red - under license
- Virgin Juicy Lemon In Color Yellow - under license
- Coors Original – under license (replaced with Tiger Beer - distribution since 2016)
- Coors Light – under license (replaced with Tiger Beer - distribution since 2016)
- Magnum 8.8 Alcomix
- Roots Ginger Brew sparkling non-alcoholic drink
- 100Plus sports drink
- Manila Beer
- Manila Beer Light
- Ultimo Craft
- Red Oak Sangria
- Vivo Wine
- Tanduay Black/Tanduay Rum Cola (rum with cola)
- Bifrutas – under license from Calidad Pascual
- Coco Fresh
- Sunkist Carbonated Juice (renamed: Sunkist Freshie/Sunkist Zero Sugar since 2020) - under license
- Brew Kettle Radler (flavored wheat beer)
- Brew Kettle (wheat beer)
- Paraiso Craft Style Beer (in Bighani and Lakas flavors)
- Pascual Chocolate Milk
- Tanduay Ice Zero (flavored vodka)
- Spritz

== Basketball teams ==
- Cobra Energy Drink Iron Men (PBL, 2009–2010; PBA D-League, 2011)
- Stag Pale Pilseners (PBL, 1995-1996)
- Manila Beer Brewmasters (PBA, 1984-1986)
