= Lufthansa Technik =

German aeronautical company

Lufthansa Technik AG
- Type: Aktiengesellschaft
- Industry: Aircraft maintenance engine overhaul
- Founded: 1 January 1995; 31 years ago in Hamburg, Germany
- Headquarters: Hamburg, Germany
- Area served: Worldwide
- Revenue: ▲€ 5.6 billion (2022)
- Operating income: ▲€ 511 million (2022)
- Number of employees: ▲20,569 (2021)
- Parent: Lufthansa Group
- Website: www.lufthansa-technik.com

Lufthansa Technik AG ('Lufthansa Engineering', often referred to simply as "LHT") is a German company that provides maintenance, repair, and overhaul (MRO) services for aircraft, engines, and components. It is a subsidiary of the Lufthansa Group.

Headquartered at Hamburg Airport, its other important German sites are in Frankfurt Airport and Munich Airport. In greater Europe, it has major base maintenance facilities in Malta, Hungary, and Bulgaria. Overseas, it has sites located in Puerto Rico, Chile, the Philippines, and China.

== History ==
The origins of Lufthansa Technik can be traced back to 1951, predating that of its parent company, the German flag carrier Lufthansa. West German officials decided that, in advance of forming a new national airline, the establishment of a new maintenance base at Hamburg Airport should be undertaken as a preparatory step. Various new hangars, workshops, and storage facilities were established, enabling a fully range of services could be provided from the onset of Lufthansa's first services on 1 April 1955. Within one year of Lufthansa's commencement of operations, it began preparing to support the airline's entry into the jet age via its adoption of the Boeing 707 jetliner. These preparations included establishing a technical liaison office in Seattle in 1958, the type was introduced two years later.

During February 1962, the company was approved by the Federal Aviation Administration (FAA) to maintain and overhaul US-registered airlines and their engines. Subsequently, the company devised in-house technical solutions for several shortcomings of the 707, such as a fuel tank cracking issue, garnering recognition from the manufacturer and other airlines alike. During February 1965, Lufthansa arranged to be the launch customer for the Boeing 737 airliner. Introduced three years later, its technical concept was influenced by input by the firm's technical department. During March 1969, the ATLAS agreement saw Lufthansa, Air France, Alitalia and Sabena establish joint maintenance agreements for the Boeing 747.

As the company transitioned from propeller aircraft to an all-jet fleet, there were similar revolutions in maintenance practice as well; fixed-interval maintenance was progressively replaced by on-condition practices, requiring the firm to introduce original monitoring technologies and diagnostic routines to reduce unnecessary work and expenditure. The 1960s and 1970s also saw larger and more well equipped facilities become available with which to undertake this work. During the 1970s, Lufthansa Technik experienced a significant growth in its third-party business, gaining custom from numerous international operators. It was during this same decade that the company became involved with the European aircraft manufacturer Airbus, providing support to the new firm even during its early years. During the 1980s and 1990s, significant investment went into the Hamburg maintenance facilities, allowing for numerous innovative maintenance techniques and designs to be pursued by the company.

Prior to the 1980s, there was little formal separation between operations of the airline and maintenance. During September 1984, an internal reorganisation of Lufthansa divided technical operations into individual management units; an increased emphasis on third party work came with this restructuring. In 1984, a separate subsidiary, Lufthansa Information Technology and Software, was established to provide software to the wider aviation industry. During the 1990s, it was decided to reorganise Lufthansa; this initiative led to the creation of Lufthansa Technik as an individual entity. Around this time, the marketplace was becoming increasingly competitive, necessitating the development of a global network and various new products to gain a competitive edge. Lufthansa Technik positioned itself as a provider of technical services for commercial aircraft, providing support to operators and other parties across the world.

Various partnerships with other companies were formed throughout the 2010s. In October 2018, it was announced that Lufthansa Technik had formed a joint venture with South Korean firm LG Electronics to market LED screens for inflight entertainment systems. During 2019, the firm expanded its cooperation with American supplier Honeywell to include MRO work on the Airbus A350 airliner, and greater logistical integration between the two companies, including the implementation of new predictive maintenance practices. The company has developed a particular focus on the Asia-Pacific region, reportedly seeking out local partners with which to expand its MRO footprint there. Similar efforts have been made in Latin American and Russia as well.

Lufthansa Technik has been extensively involved in cabin completion and conversion projects, including for the VIP sector of the market; it operates a dedicated US-based subsidiary, BizJet International, that undertakes such work in the North American region. During late 2017, Lufthansa Technik announced the launch of a multi-purpose cabin conversion programme for the Airbus A330 MRTT aerial refuelling tanker; that same year, the firm also secured its first VIP cabin completion project for a Boeing Business Jet 787. Around the same time, the firm was also engaged in refitting Lufthansa's Airbus A320 narrowbody fleet with Ka band datalinks for high bandwidth communication purposes. Lufthansa Technik has been involved in the outfitting of the German government's aircraft for its special air wing, used by government officials such as the Chancellor.

During early 2020, Lufthansa Technik announced the launch of a freighter conversion programme for the Airbus A380, a large twin-deck passenger airliner, in addition to 14 separate projects for various other passenger aircraft, such as the A330 and A350. The conversion process typically involves removing passenger seats and the installation of freight pallets on the seat tracks in accordance with existing load and safety considerations. Aerospace periodical Flight International has speculated that the timing of the A380 conversion project ought to be fortuitous and is likely to be well received by the market.

== Facilities ==
Hangar at Frankfurt Airport

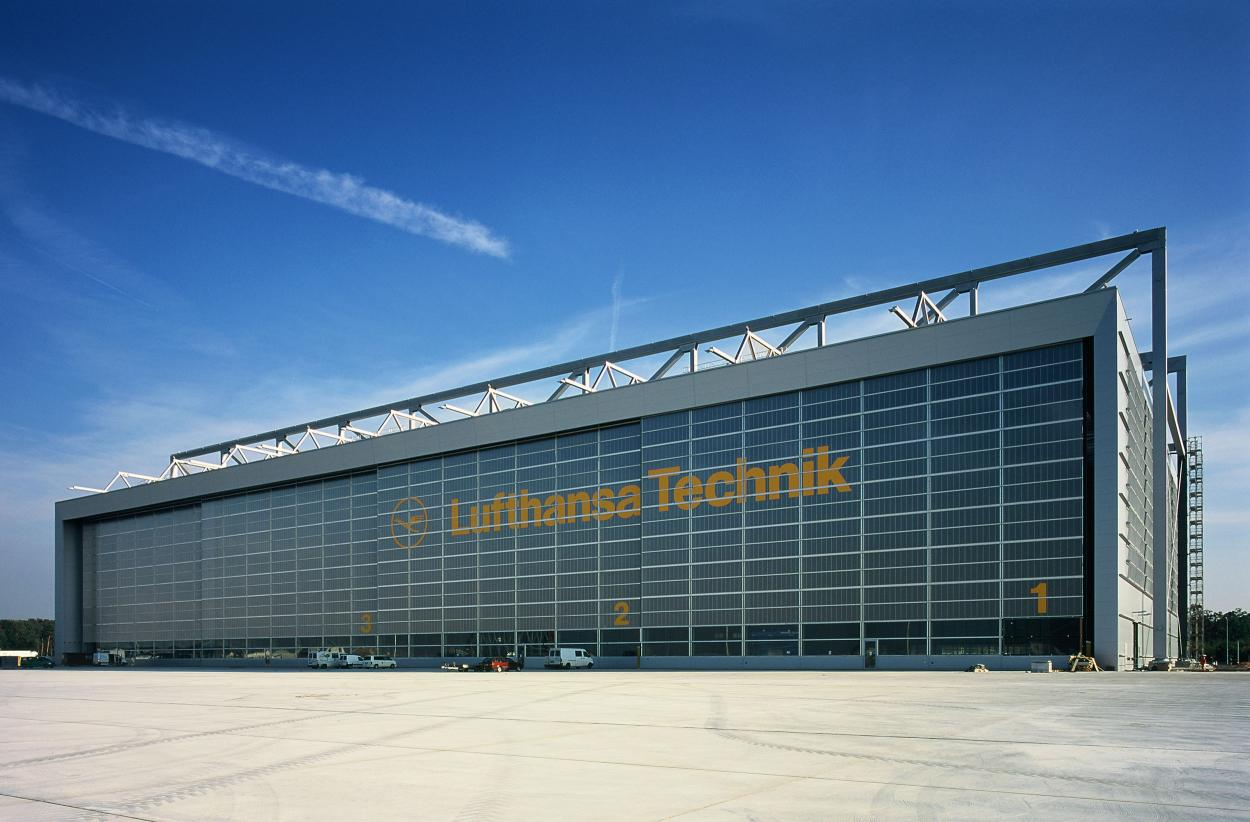
Hangar at Frankfurt Airport

=== Headquarters ===
- Germany - Lufthansa Technik Headquarters

=== Europe ===
- Austria - INAIRVATION
- Bulgaria - Lufthansa Technik Sofia
- Germany
  - Lufthansa Technik AERO Alzey
  - Lufthansa Technik Logistik Services
  - Lufthansa Technical Training
  - LEOS
  - Lufthansa Bombardier Aviation Services
  - Lufthansa Technik Intercoat
  - Avionic Design
  - IDAIR
  - Lumics
- Hungary - Lufthansa Technik Budapest
- Italy - Lufthansa Technik Milan
- Ireland - Lufthansa Technik Turbine Shannon
- Malta - Lufthansa Technik Malta
- United Kingdom - Lufthansa Technik Landing Gear Services UK

=== Americas ===
- Puerto Rico - Lufthansa Technik Puerto Rico was the first center for maintenance, repair, and refurbishing of commercial airliners opened by Lufthansa in the Americas. This facility is located in the town of Aguadilla, in northwestern Puerto Rico, and employs 200 technical workers. This center for the maintenance of airliners started operations on 21 July 2015. Five overhaul lines can serve various planes simultaneously. The facility provides maintenance to short- and medium-haul aircraft. This technical center is connected to the runway of the Rafael Hernández International Airport, which has the longest runway in the Caribbean. The development of this facility was considered a significant step for Lufthansa Technik involvement in the Americas since the Airport's 11,700-foot runway and 3,900 acres of land was considered an ideal location for this type of facility. Spirit Airlines and JetBlue Airways are among the carriers served in this center.
- United States
  - Lufthansa Technik Component Services
  - Hawker Pacific Aerospace
  - BizJet International
  - Heico Aerospace

=== Asia ===
- China
  - Ameco
  - Lufthansa Technik Shenzhen
- Hong Kong - Lufthansa Technik Component Services Asia Pacific
- India - Lufthansa Technik Services India
- Malaysia - Airfoil Services Sdn. Bhd.
- Philippines - Lufthansa Technik Philippines
- UAE - Lufthansa Technik Middle East
