= Sunkist (soft drink) =

Line of fruit-flavored carbonated beverages

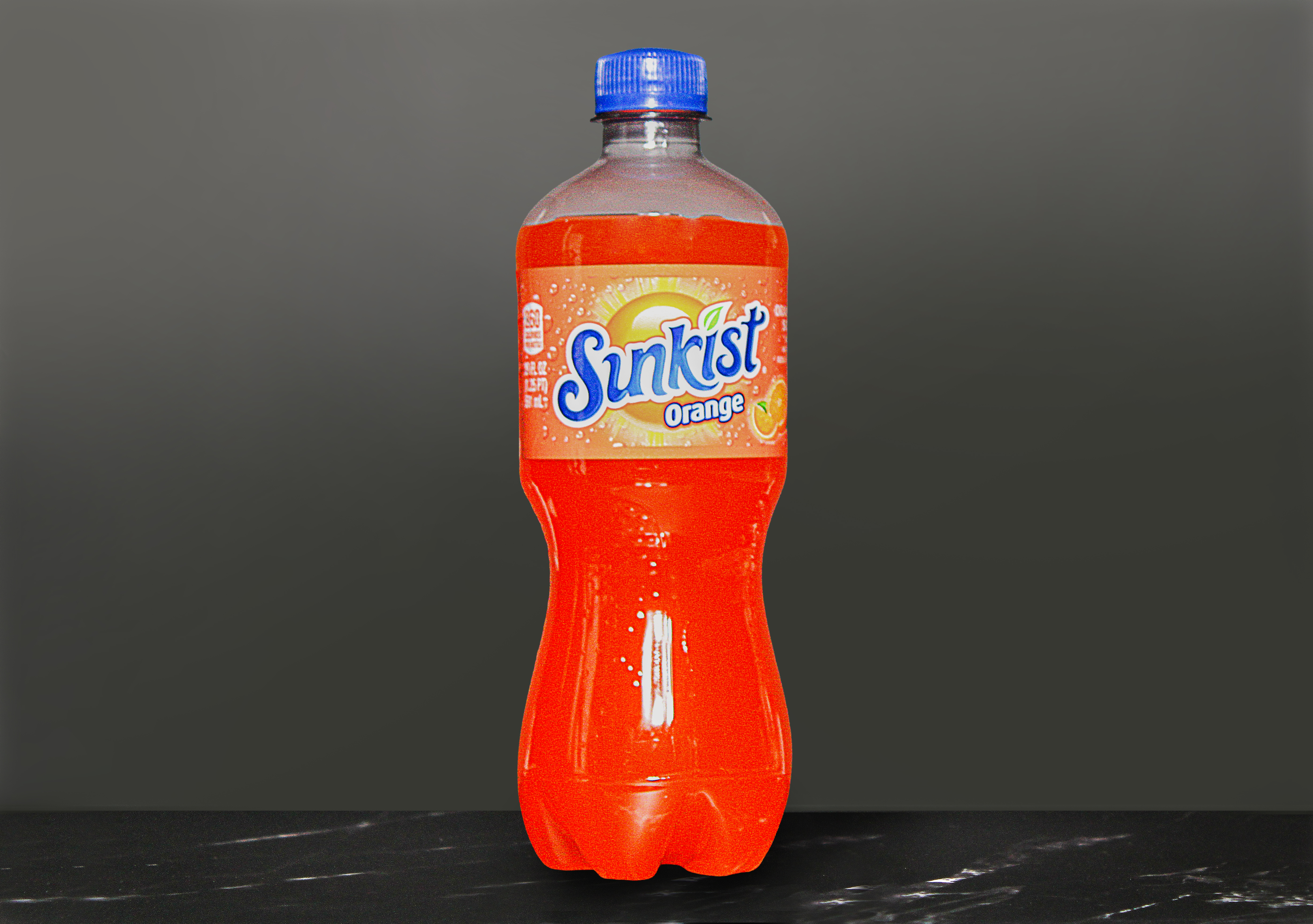
- 20oz bottle of Sunkist Orange
- Type: Soft drink
- Manufacturer: Keurig Dr Pepper
- Origin: New Mexico, United States
- Introduced: 1979; 47 years ago
- Related products: Fanta, Crush, Mirinda
- Website: www.sunkistsoda.com

Sunkist, also marketed as Sunkist Soda, is a brand of primarily orange-flavored soft drinks that launched in 1979. Sunkist primarily competes with The Coca-Cola Company's Fanta and PepsiCo's Crush.

Produced by Keurig Dr Pepper, a variety of Sunkist flavors are made. In addition to Orange, there is Diet Orange, Grape, Strawberry, Cherry Limeade, Pineapple, Lemonade, Diet Lemonade, Peach, Fruit Punch, Pink Lemonade, Strawberry Lemonade, Berry Lemonade, Watermelon Lemonade and Orange Mango.

== History ==
Sunkist was first licensed by Sunkist Growers to the General Cinema Corporation, the leading independent bottler of Pepsi-Cola products at the time. The soft drink was the idea of Mark Stevens, who foresaw the potential based on market research which indicated that, worldwide, orange was the third-best-selling soft drink flavor (largely due to Fanta).

After extensive R&D during 1977 and early 1978, in which research was conducted on taste, color and carbonation levels, Sunkist made a grand introduction in New York by franchising it to The Coca-Cola Bottling Company of New York City, where Edward F. O'Reilly was president. At the time of introduction, Sunkist Soft Drinks had only five key employees: Mark Stevens, President; Peter Murphy, VP Sales; Dr. John Leffingwell, VP R&D; Ray Sissom, VP Finance; and Jim DeDreu, NE Regional Manager. It went national soon thereafter by being franchised mainly to leading Coca-Cola and Pepsi-Cola bottlers. The advertising slogan was "fun, sun and the beach" using TV and radio commercials with the Beach Boys' hit song "Good Vibrations" as the brand's theme. In 1980, Sunkist Orange Soda became the #1 orange soda in the US and the tenth-best-selling soft drink.

In 2010, there was a consumer recall after a batch was accidentally mixed with six times the amount of caffeine, sickening consumers.

In late 1984, Sunkist Soft Drinks was sold to Del Monte. From late 1986 until 2008, it was produced by Cadbury Schweppes under license through its Cadbury Schweppes Americas Beverages subsidiary. Following the demerger of Cadbury Schweppes Americas Beverages from Cadbury Schweppes, it is now produced by Keurig Dr Pepper in the US.

== Distribution ==
Keurig Dr Pepper licenses out the brand to other companies internationally.

In the United Kingdom, the drink was originally licensed to Coca-Cola & Schweppes Enterprises, but in June 1999, Cadbury Schweppes secured Vimto Soft Drinks to distribute the product in the UK.

In Australia, Asahi has distributed the product. (with a caffeine-free formulation).

In the Philippines, it was sold by Cosmos Bottling until 2001, when San Miguel Corporation acquired Cosmos and sold its brands to Coca-Cola Bottlers Philippines, Inc. As of 2013, Sunkist is sold by Asia Brewery.

== Contents ==
Sunkist 'Orange'
Nutritional value per 1 can (375-millilitre)
- Energy: 833 kJ (199 kcal)
- Carbohydrates: 48.4 g
- Sugars: 48.4 g
- Fat: 0 g
- Protein: 0 g
Vitamins and minerals
Minerals	Quantity %DV^{†}
Sodium	1% 34 mg
- ^{†}Percentages estimated using US recommendations for adults.

Sunkist 'Orange'
Nutritional value per 1 can (355-millilitre)
- Energy: 711.28 kJ (170.00 kcal)
- Carbohydrates: 44 g
- Sugars: 43 g
- Fat: 0 g
- Protein: 0 g
Vitamins and minerals
Minerals	Quantity %DV^{†}
Sodium	3% 70 mg
- ^{†}Percentages estimated using US recommendations for adults.

Unlike many other competing orange sodas, Sunkist (at least the original formulation in the US) contains caffeine (19 mg per 12 fl oz). In Canada, a caffeine-free version of the orange drink is marketed as C'Plus.
