= LT Group =

Philippine publicly-listed holding company owned by Lucio Tan

LT Group, Inc.
- Trade name: LT Group
- Formerly: The Manila Wine Merchants, Inc. (1937–1995); Asian Pacific Equity Corporation (1995–1999); Tanduay Holdings, Inc. (1999–2012)
- Type: Public
- Traded as: PSE: LTG
- Founded: May 25, 1937; 89 years ago
- Founder: Lucio C. Tan
- Headquarters: 11th Floor, Unit 3 Bench Tower, 30th Street corner Rizal Drive, Crescent Park West 5, Bonifacio Global City, Taguig, Metro Manila, Philippines
- Area served: Worldwide
- Key people: Lucio C. Tan (Chairman and CEO); Lucio C. Tan III (President and COO); Jose Gabriel D. Olives (CFO)
- Revenue: ₱91.2 billion (2021)
- Net income: ₱20.2 billion (2021)
- Website: ltg.com.ph

LT Group, Inc. (LTG) is a Philippine publicly listed holding company headquartered in Bonifacio Global City, Taguig.

LT Group, Inc. is majority-owned by Tangent Holdings Corporation, its ultimate parent company (also controlled by Tan).

== History ==
LT Group, Inc. (LTG) was incorporated on May 25, 1937, as The Manila Wine Merchants, Inc. (TMWMI). On November 17, 1947, TMWMI was listed in the Philippine Stock Exchange (PSE). On September 22, 1995, the Securities and Exchange Commission (SEC) approved the company's name change to Asian Pacific Equity Corporation (APEC) as well as the change of its role from a merchant to a holding company. On November 10, 1999, the corporate name was again changed to Tanduay Holdings, Inc (THI), and again on November 20, 2012, to its current name, LT Group, Inc. (LTG).

== Acquisitions ==
On July 8, 1999, as Asian Pacific Equity Corporation, the company acquired 100% ownership of Twin Ace Holdings (Tanduay) in a stock swap. On July 30, 1999, Twin Ace Holdings changed its name to Tanduay Distillers, Inc.

Since 2012, the company began a series of consolidation of assets belonging to Tan by acquiring interests in Asia Brewery, Inc., Fortune Tobacco Corporation, Eton Properties Philippines, Inc. (Paramount LandEquities, Inc. and Saturn Land Holdings, Inc.), Philippine National Bank, Allied Banking Corporation and Victorias Milling Company.

== Companies ==
=== Air transport ===
- PAL Holdings, Inc. (PSE: PAL) ~ 4% co-ownership with ANA Holdings
  - Philippine Airlines, Inc.
  - PAL Express (Air Philippines Corporation, formerly Air Philippines and Airphil Express)

=== Banking ===
- Philippine National Bank (merger of Philippine National Bank and Allied Bank) (PSE: PNB)

=== Education ===
- University of the East

=== Food & beverage ===
- Asia Brewery
- Tanduay Distillers, Inc.
  - Absolute Distillers

=== Hotels ===
- Maranaw Hotels and Resort Corporation
  - Century Park Hotel
  - The Mini Suites Eton Tower Makati

=== Real estate ===
- Eton Properties Philippines
  - Eton Centris
  - Eton City

=== Tobacco & alcohol ===
- Asian Alcohol Corporation
- Fortune Tobacco Corporation (FTC)
  - PMFTC, Inc. - 50% ownership by FTC

=== Others ===
- Allianz-PNB Life Insurance Inc. - Life insurance company. Allianz restarted its operations in 2016 under an exclusive partnership with the Philippine National Bank.
- MacroAsia Corporation - is one of the leading providers of aviation-related support services in the Philippines. (PSE: MAC)
- Victorias Milling Company (PSE: VMC) - minority ownership and management control
