= Lucio Tan =

Filipino businessman (born 1934)

Lucio C. Tan Sr.
- 陳永栽
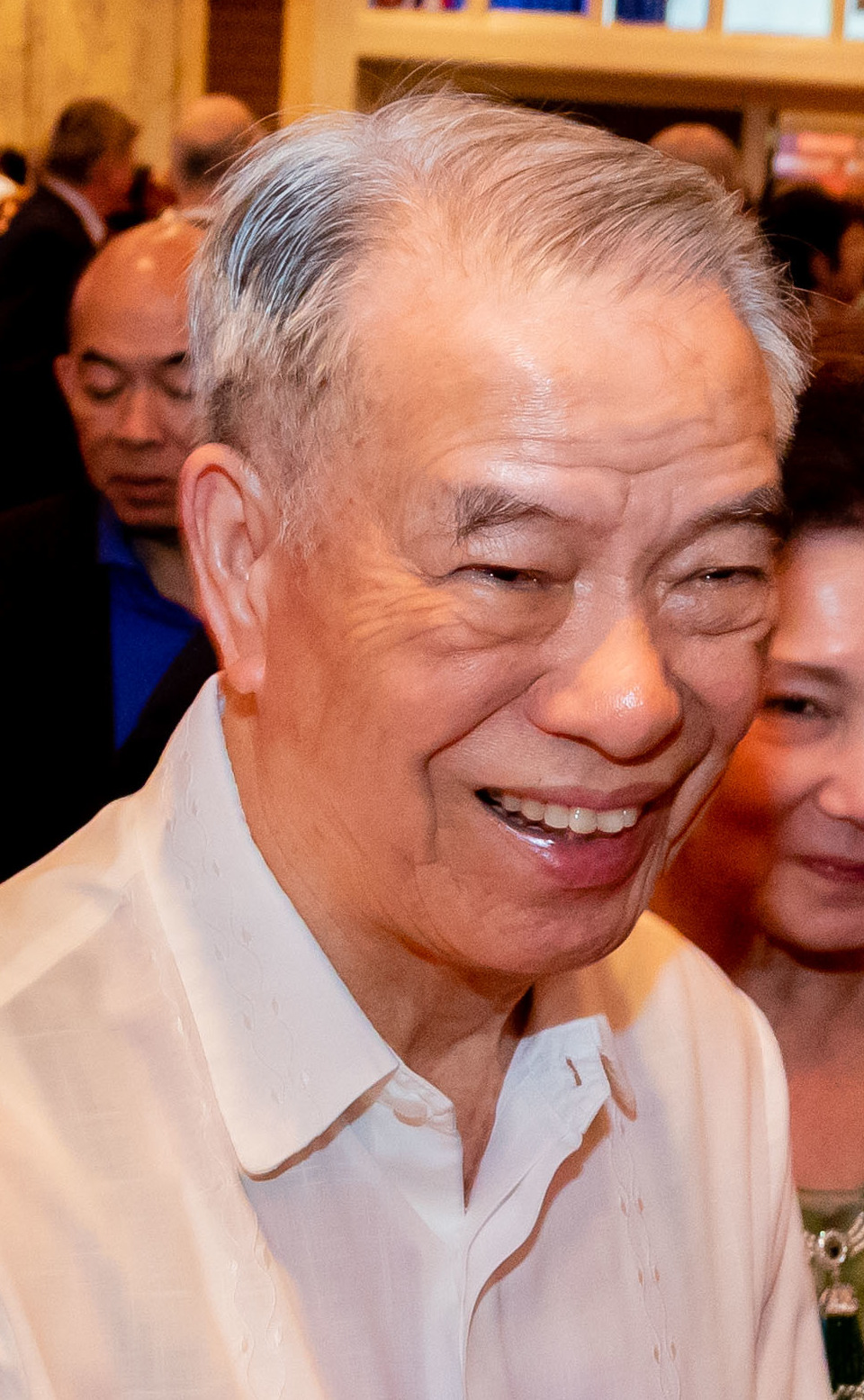
- Tan in 2018
- Born: July 17, 1934 (age 92); Amoy, Fukien, Republic of China
- Education: Chiang Kai Shek College; Far Eastern University
- Occupations: Businessman, philanthropist
- Known for: Chairman and CEO (LT Group, Inc., Philippine Airlines, MacroAsia Corporation)
- Spouses: Carmen Khao; Lucia G. Tan (died 2020)
- Children: 6, including Bong

Chinese name
- Traditional Chinese: 陳永栽
- Simplified Chinese: 陈永栽
Transcriptions
Standard Mandarin
- Hanyu Pinyin: Chén Yǒngzāi
Southern Min
- Hokkien POJ: Tân Éng-chai

Lucio Chua Tan Sr. (traditional Chinese: 陳永栽; simplified Chinese: 陈永栽; Pe̍h-ōe-jī: Tân Éng-chai; pinyin: Chén Yǒngzāi; born July 17, 1934) is a Filipino billionaire businessman and philanthropist. He presides over the Filipino conglomerate company LT Group, Inc., a company with extensive business interests in sports, banking, airline, liquor, tobacco, real estate, beverages, and education.

Born in Amoy, Fujian in China, Tan's family migrated to the Philippines during his childhood and became residents of Naga, Camarines Sur. In the 1950s, Tan worked as an employee at a cigarette company during his chemical engineering studies at the Far Eastern University. After his graduation, he established the chemical firm Himmel Industries in Pasig in 1960, and by 1966, he co-founded the cigarette manufacturing company Fortune Tobacco Corporation in Parang, Marikina in 1966.

During martial law, Tan acquired General Bank and Trust in 1977 and renamed it Allied Banking Corporation; by 1982, Tan established Asia Brewery. After President Ferdinand Marcos was overthrown during the People Power Revolution in 1986, Tan's business activities with Marcos came under intense scrutiny, with several tax evasion cases filed against him. By 2001, Marcos' wife Imelda Marcos admitted to Marcos having "beneficial ownership" with Tan in his businesses, while her son Bongbong Marcos later testified in 2007 to his father's significant ownership over nine companies owned by Tan in the 1980s.

In 1992, Tan acquired majority ownership of Philippine Airlines. By the 2000s, he was deemed the wealthiest person in the Philippines. As of March 2026, Forbes estimated his net worth at US$3.5 billion, making him the third-wealthiest person in the Philippines.

== Early life and education ==
Tan was born in Amoy (now Xiamen), Fujian, China. His parents moved to Cebu in the Philippines when he was a child, and to Naga, Camarines Sur when he was a teenager. He was said to have gone to school barefoot and first worked as a stevedore who tied cargo with ropes made from abaca. He graduated from Chiang Kai Shek High School in Manila in 1955, and later earned a bachelor's degree in chemical engineering from the Far Eastern University, also in Manila.

== Career ==
Sometime in the late 1950s, Tan worked as an employee at the Bataan Cigar and Cigarette Factory in San Francisco del Monte, Quezon City, being assigned to the purchasing of tobacco leaves from Ilocos Region. According to Forbes, Tan "worked as a janitor at a tobacco factory" where he "mopped floors to pay for school."

In November 1960, Tan founded the chemical manufacturing company Himmel Industries, Inc. in Barrio Santolan, Pasig.

In 1966, Tan co-founded Fortune Tobacco Corporation (FTC; now PMFTC), with Benito Tan Kee Hiong, Atty. Florencio N. Santos, and Mariano Tanenglian. Within the next 15 years, FTC became the largest cigarette manufacturer in the country.

Tan acquired the insolvent General Bank and Trust in 1977 and subsequently renamed it Allied Banking Corporation.

Asia Brewery, Inc. was established by Tan in 1982, with the inauguration of its brewery in Cabuyao, Laguna and the launch of its first brand, Beer Hausen Pale Pilsen. The brewery grew steadily in the following decade, increasing its capacity, expanding and diversifying its product lines.

In 1988, Tan acquired Tanduay Distillers for ₱1 billion through Twin Ace Holdings Corporation.

In 1992, Tan won the bid that secured the purchase of the newly-privatized Philippine Airlines and became chairman of the airline three years later. Founder Benjamin M. Bitanga of the aviation support services company MacroAsia Corporation sold it to Tan in 1995.

In 2012, Tan created a conglomerate with estimated total assets of at least $5 billion by consolidating all his holdings in liquor, cigarette, banking, real estate and airlines into a single listed entity, Tanduay Holdings Inc. Tanduay Holdings Inc. was also approved to change its name to LT Group Inc.

== Philanthropy ==
Though the companies of Lucio Tan Group has been involved in various social responsible programs, Tan has benevolent personal philanthropy works, particularly in the academic sector. Notable of which is his ownership stake with the University of the East, resulting for the erection of the nine-storey Dr. Lucio C. Tan Building on the university's Caloocan City campus. Tan also gave a grant as an endowment for the development of Central Philippine University Institute of HRM and Tourism in Jaro, Iloilo City, which in return, was renamed in his honor as the Dr. Lucio C. Tan College of Hospitality Management, the first college/school in his namesake outside Manila. A building which houses the said college is also named after him on the CPU's main campus, the Lucio C. Tan Building.

In the 1990s, Tan was president of the Lorenzo Ruiz Mission Institute Foundation (LRMFI), an organization established in 1989 and composed of Chinese-Filipino Catholics that aims to spread the Christian faith worldwide.

== Political involvement ==
During the 1986 snap presidential election, Tan assisted in the reelection campaign of President Ferdinand Marcos. According to Rene Magtubo, the union president of Fortune Tobacco Labor Union from 1986 to 2009, Tan had sent Fortune Tobacco employees on rides to Marcos campaign stops using Love Buses for them to serve as cheering supporters, and were then given allowances for their participation.

Tan endorsed the candidacy of Ramon Mitra Jr. during the 1992 presidential election, investing in the campaign by providing delivery trucks from his businesses to help spread Mitra's campaign materials. Mitra ultimately lost to Fidel V. Ramos after placing fourth in the vote tally.

According to Bongbong Marcos' testimony to the Sandiganbayan in 2007, in the months prior to the 1995 election, Tan held a dinner meeting with Marcos at the residence of Marcos loyalist Luis Tabuena and offered him a one-million peso check for his senatorial election campaign, one which Marcos proceeded to tear up due to Tan's denial in being Ferdinand Marcos Sr.'s business partner.

In the 1998 presidential election, Tan was alleged to have donated ₱1.5 billion to the presidential campaign of Vice President Joseph Estrada despite not being named in the list of contributors that Estrada's camp submitted to the Commission on Elections (Comelec). After winning the presidency, Estrada subsequently appointed several persons who had associations with Tan to government positions: presidential assistant Rosario Yu, Tan's former secretary; presidential consultant for Chinese affairs Julio Tan, his second wife's uncle; and presidential consultant on the steel industry John Ng, his daughter's father-in-law.

== Controversies ==
In the 1990s, Forbes reported about the "considerable corruption still prevalent" in the Philippines, bolstering that claim by citing how Tan "single-handedly held up a tax reform intended to remove special privileges for local tobacco and beer producers." and that Tan was spending his free time "[j]ousting with the government over charges of tax evasion" and with Philippine Airlines "shareholders who tried to block his bid for the airline." However, the 25 billion-peso (US$622 million) tax evasion case against Tan was dismissed in March 1999, after simmering through the terms of presidents Corazon Aquino and Fidel Ramos.

The Presidential Commission on Good Government ("PCGG") filed a case against Tan in July 1987, claiming that the state is entitled to PHP 50 billion in damages and PHP 1 billion in legal expenses. The PCGG also alleged that the companies that Tan held in trust for the former president Marcos – such as Fortune Tobacco, Asia Brewery, Allied Banking Corporation, Foremost Farms, Himmel Industries, Grandspan Development Corp., Silangan Holdings, Dominium Realty and Construction Corp., and Shareholdings Inc. – were illegally acquired by Marcos using government funds. The state was seeking to recover 60% of Tan's holdings in those companies. The PCGG then seized control of Tan's companies until the anti-graft court Sandiganbayan's decision in 2006 to nullify the writs of sequestration on the companies—the court ruled that the writs had no basis as there was no prima facie proof that any of Tan's assets were obtained illegally. Following the PCGG's appeal, the Supreme Court of the Philippines on December 7, 2007 affirmed the decision of the lower court, having found no proof that Tan, his family, or his various businesses took undue advantage of their relationship with former president Marcos or no factual basis for the sequestration of the stocks. The PCGG announced through court filings on 29 April 2009 that it would be "resting its case" and terminating its PHP 51 billion lawsuit even though the government lawyers had earlier insisted in court that they still had several key witnesses, including former First Lady Imelda Marcos.

In 2017, President Rodrigo Duterte accused Tan of owing the Philippine government around US$600 million in unpaid taxes, but subsequently decided to stop discussing the issue.

== Personal life ==
Tan is married, with six children, and lives in Manila, Philippines. His first wife, Carmen is the mother of his eldest son, Lucio Jr. ("Bong"), who died in November 2019. Bong's son, Lucio III ("Hun Hun"), is considered to be Tan's heir apparent.

His second wife Lucia "Letty" G. Tan, with whom he had five children, died on August 31, 2020, aged 77.
