= MacroAsia Corporation =

Philippine aviation support company

- Company type: Public
- Traded as: PSE: MAC
- Industry: MRO, ground handling, airline catering services, Water Delivery, Sewerage, Mining
- Predecessor: Infanta Mineral and Development Corporation
- Founded: 1970; 56 years ago
- Founders: Benjamin M. Bitanga
- Headquarters: PNB Allied Bank Center, Ayala Ave., Makati, Philippines
- Area served: Philippines
- Key people: Lucio C. Tan Sr. (Chairman and CEO); Eduardo Luis T. Luy (President and COO); Amador T. Sendin (CFO and CRO); Kyle Ellis C. Tan (Treasurer)
- Parent: LT Group, Inc.
- Website: macroasiacorp.com

MacroAsia Corporation is a leading provider of aviation-related support services in the Philippines. Its major business segments derive income from aircraft maintenance, repair and overhaul (MRO), food services (airline and institutional catering), gateway services (ground handling), property development and leases (ecozone operations) and water concessions/utility. As of March 2019, it is the country's largest provider of aviation support services.

== History ==
The company began in 1970 as Infanta Mineral and Development Corporation, shipping out nickel ore.

In 1995, the company was renamed as MacroAsia Corporation, moving from mining to aviation support services. In the same year Benjamin M. Bitanga sold the company to Lucio Tan.

In 1996, the MacroAsia Catering Services Corporation (MACS) was established.

In 1999, the MacroAsia Airport Services Corporation (MASCORP) was established.

In 2000, with the joint venture of Lufthansa Technik, the Lufthansa Technik Philippines was established with 49% ownership.

In 2016, MacroAsia ventured to water distribution and treatment in Boracay, Nueva Vizcaya, and Cavite.

In March 2019, the MacroAsia serviced the Philippine Airlines and PAL Express 100%, making it one of the largest aviation support services in the country.

== Attached companies ==
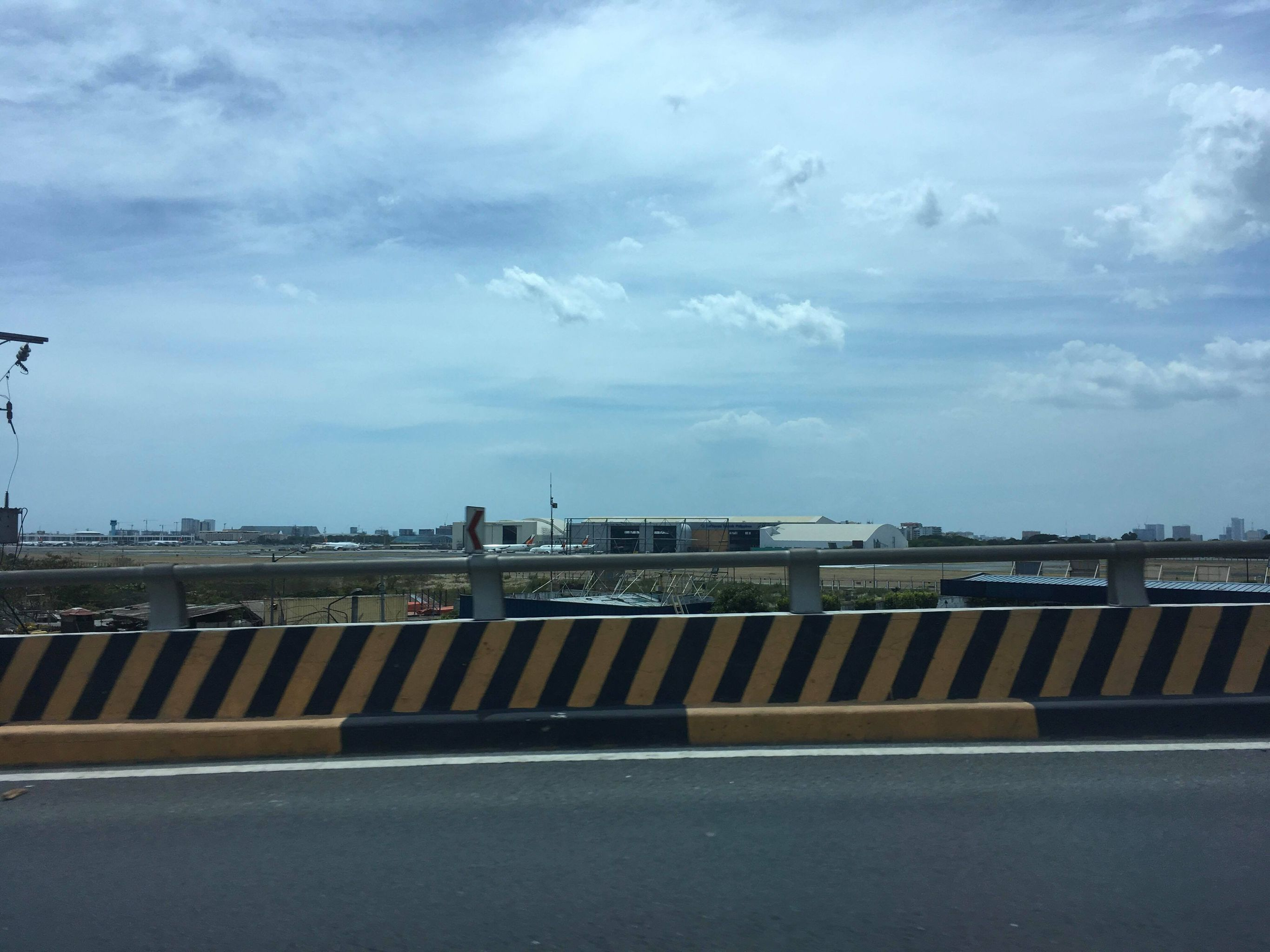
Lufthansa Technik Philippines' hangar inside NAIA, as seen from SLEX

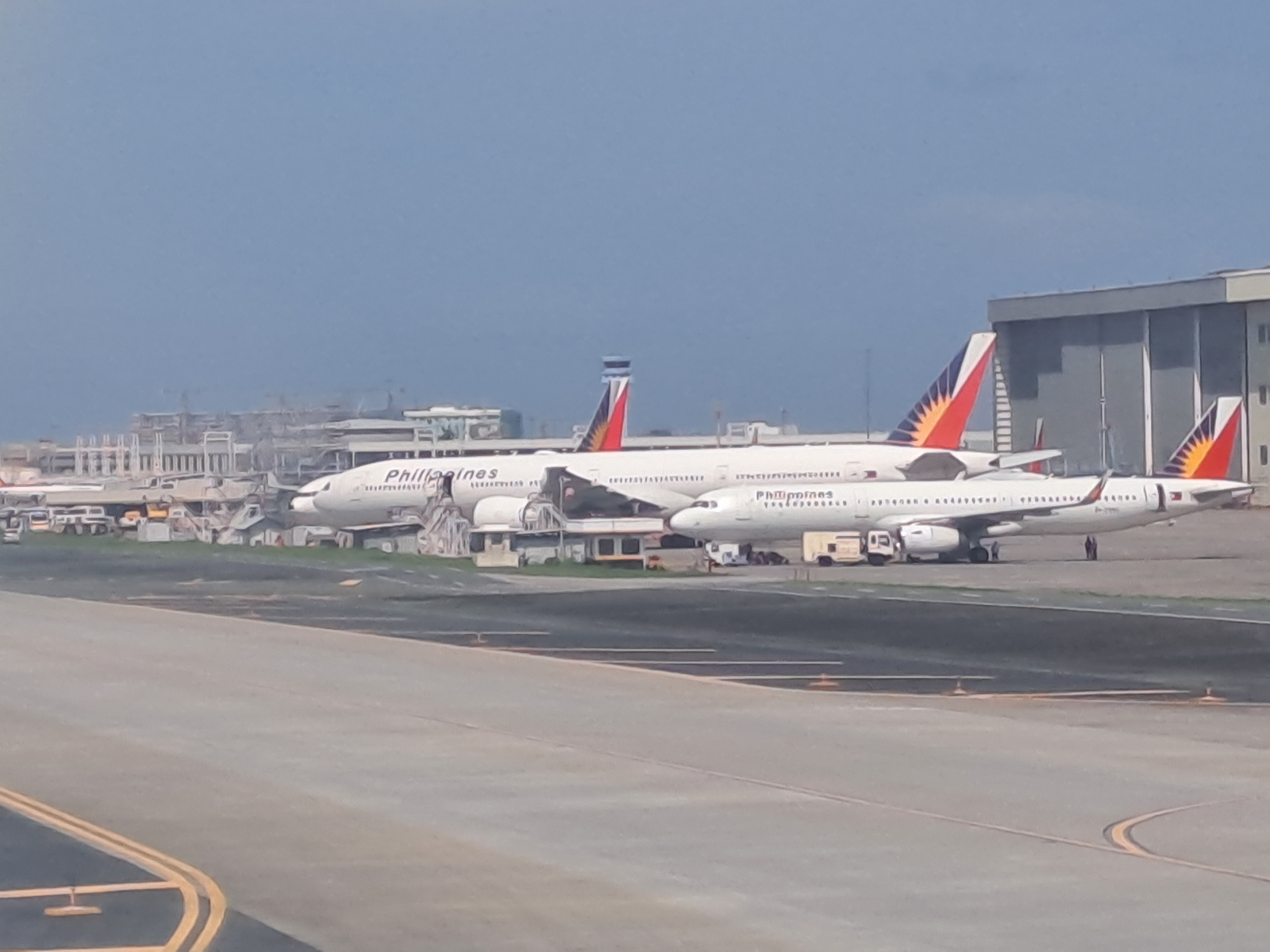
Aircraft of Philippine Airlines parked next to the maintenance hangars of Lufthansa Technik Philippines, NAIA

- Lufthansa Technik Philippines (LTP) - 51% ownership of Lufthansa Technik, 49% ownership of MacroAsia Corporation. It is a globally competitive company offering aircraft and engine maintenance, repair, and overhaul, with airline clients from almost all parts of the world including Philippine Airlines.
  - On March 12, 2024, Elmar Lutter, Lufthansa Technik Philippines President announced the groundbreaking project of the P8.4-billion ($150 million) hangar facility at Clark International Airport. Its planned second hangar was unveiled during the Philippine officials' Berlin, Germany visit, led by President Ferdinand R. Marcos Jr and Alfredo E. Pascual.
- MacroAsia Catering Services, Inc. (MACS) - 67% ownership of MacroAsia Corporation, 33% ownership of SATS Ltd. It is a majority-owned subsidiary that operates its own kitchen in Ninoy Aquino International Airport (NAIA). It offers catering to the majority of international airline clients that fly to Manila.
  - MacroAsia SATS Inflight Catering Services Corporation (MSIS) - It offers catering services of Philippine Airlines and PAL Express.
  - MacroAsia SATS Food Industries Corporation (MSFI) - It offers catering for institutional clients outside airport such as bank, BPO, and casinos.
- MacroAsia Airport Services Corporation (MASCorp)- 80% ownership of MacroAsia Corporation, 20% ownership of Konoike Transport Co. It provides gateway services that includes various ground handling activities such as passenger check-in services, ramp handling, baggage and cargo handling.
- Cebu Pacific Catering Services - 40% ownership of MacroAsia Corporation, 40% ownership of Cathay Pacific, 20% MGO Pacific Resources. The only catering service in Mactan-Cebu International Airport (MCIA).
- MacroAsia Properties Development Corporation (MAPDC) - a developer/operator of the sole Special Economic Zone at the NAIA and Mactan-Cebu International Airport (MCIA)
  - Boracay Tubi System Inc. - a water concessioner in Boracay
  - Naic Water Supply Corporation - a water concessioner in Naic, Cavite
  - SNV Resources Development Corporation - a water concessioner in Solano, Nueva Vizcaya
- MacroAsia Air Taxi Services, Inc. (MAATS) - a fixed-base operations (FBO) service provider of auxiliary service support of executive jets and permitting requirements of fixed-wing aircraft operators with no commercial presence in the Philippines
- First Aviation Academy Inc. (FAA) - 51% ownership of MacroAsia Corporation, 49% ownership of PTC. A pilot training school and skills assessment center for aviation professionals.
- MacroAsia Mining Corporation (MMC) - mining exploration service that specializes in nickel ore
