= Hope Luxury =

Philippine cigarette brand

- Product type: Cigarette
- Current owner: PMFTC
- Produced by: PMFTC
- Country: Philippines
- Introduced: October 1, 1975
- Markets: Philippines
- Previous owners: Fortune Tobacco Corporation
- Tagline: "Enjoy the great Hope freshness" (1986-1990) "The largest selling luxury cigarette in the country" (1979-1986) "The No. 1 selling cigarette in the country." (1981-1986) "The largest-selling luxury cigarette" (1990-2005) "Enjoy that great Hope freshness" (2005-2006) "Experience the thrill" (2006-2008) "Life Relaxed" (2008-present)

Hope (labeled as Hope Luxury) is a Philippine cigarette brand owned by Fortune Tobacco Corporation and manufactured and distributed by PMFTC, Inc. It is sold as a mentholated cigarette in 100-mm and 85-mm sticks.
