= Benjamin M. Bitanga =

Filipino investment banker

Benjamin "Benjie" Bitanga
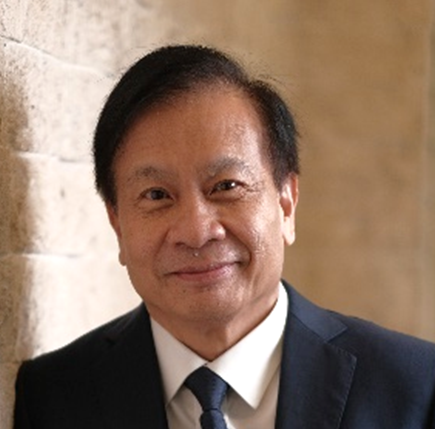
- Bitanga in April 2018
- Born: Benjamin Mendoza Bitanga; December 31, 1952 (age 73); Philippines
- Occupations: Businessman, investment banker, and entrepreneur.
- Employer(s): Founder, CEO, president of MRC Allied Inc.

Benjamin "Benjie" Mendoza Bitanga (born December 31, 1952) is a Filipino investment banker. He is the present chairman, president, CEO, and CIO of MRC Allied Inc., a property development firm in the Philippines, now also engaged in the mining industry.

== Early life and education ==
Bitanga attended Ateneo de Manila University, where he graduated in 1973 with a Bachelor of Science Degree in Management. He then took post graduate studies at the Asian Institute of Management (AIM) where he graduated in 1977 with a master's degree in Business Administration.

== Career ==
=== 1993–1995:Macroasia Corporation ===
Bitanga is the founder and president of MacroAsia Corporation, a leading holding company in the Philippines. He secured the Airline Catering License from the Manila International Airport Authority (MIAA) and its eventual joint venture agreement with Eurest Corporation of France in setting up an airline catering facility within the property of the MIAA.

In 1995, he then sold his company to the Tan family, and became the airline-related unit of the Tans, and Baguio Gold, which is also known as the PAL Holdings Inc.

=== 1997–2001: Batangas Laguna Tayabas Bus Company (BLTBCo) ===
Bitanga is a business associate, chairman, and chief executive officer of the Batangas Laguna Tayabas Bus Company (BLTBCo). He upholds BLTBCo's status as one of the country's best transportation enterprises at present that services people from the southern part of Luzon and Leyte/Samar.

=== 1990–2005: Asian Appraisal Company ===
Bitanga held a position in the Asian Appraisal Company as chairman and President. During that time, he established a national precedent in securing approval from the SEC(Securities and Exchange Commission) to allow valuation of companies and its assets using future cash flow. Because of this, companies from different industries has also been successful in adopting this valuation method to value their assets. In 1993, he was awarded the mandate to value Tsing Tao Brewery, Inc. and their IPO using the same valuation approach.

=== 1994–present ===
Bitanga is the founder of MRC Allied Industries Inc., which later became MRC Allied Inc., and currently holds position as the chairman and president of the company. He was accountable for the company's conversion from a rubber processing company to a real estate business, particularly in the Industrial Estate Sector, with concentration in the Southern City of Cebu. In 1995, he implemented a widely successful initial public offering (IPO) of the company with the Philippine Stock Exchange, which attracted local and foreign investors like SSS(Social Security System) and GIC(Government of Singapore Investment Corporation). A year later the company's stock rose from an introductory Php 1.50 to Php 9.00. He was responsible for converting MRC's 350 hectare property in Cebu to a planned world class township which led to its classification as an Export Processing Zone. He led the company successfully through the Asian Financial Crisis of 1997, by means of rehabilitation efforts completed in 2010, which led to the company's diversification of its interest into other industries including mining. Through aggressive acquisition of mining assets, which focuses on gold and copper, he leads the company through successful negotiations with leading gold and copper producers for joint venture projects.
