= More (cigarette) =

American cigarette brand

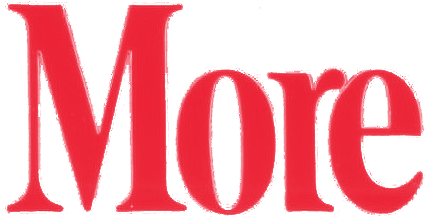
- Product type: Cigarette
- Produced by: R. J. Reynolds (US only); Japan Tobacco (EU only); PMFTC (Philippines only)
- Country: United States
- Introduced: June 1975; 51 years ago
- Markets: See Markets
- Tagline: "Dare to be More" "That Brave Bold Blend" (1986-1990) "A taste of magic" (1994-2004) "Capture the Taste of Classic" (2004-2006) (Philippines)

More is an American brand of cigarettes, owned and manufactured by the R.J. Reynolds Tobacco Company in the United States, Japan Tobacco in the European Union and PMFTC in the Philippines.

== History ==
The brand was introduced by the R.J. Reynolds Tobacco Company in 1974. More was originally marketed to both men and women and then changed its primary focus to female consumers. It typically has a dark brown (rather than the traditional white) wrapper and is typically 120 mm (4.7 in) in length. The More brand does, however, produce shorter versions with the typical white wrapper and white or cork filters.

Bridging the gap between cigars and cigarettes, More was the first successful 120 mm cigarette. It had a strong flavor and when introduced was higher in tar and nicotine than most filter cigarettes on the market. It is sold in both the full flavor and menthol flavors. It is considered a niche brand by R.J. Reynolds, still sold, but not promoted by advertising.

It is sold globally under license to various other tobacco companies under the title of More International. The brand was expanded to include 'light' styles in the form of both brown and white 120 mm and a beige 100 mm (3.9 in) version.

The brand appeared in the 2021 movie Swan Song.

== Advertising ==
R.J. Reynolds made various poster adverts to promote the More brand in the 1980s and 1990s, and posters for More International were also made by Japan Tobacco outside the U.S.

In the Philippines, a TV ad was made in the 1990s to promote the More brand. A radio advert was also made in 2002. In 2004, More Classic cigarettes was launched until 2006 with its new tagline "Capture the Taste of Classic" replacing "A Taste of Magic".

== Markets ==
More cigarettes are mainly sold in the United States, but also were or still are sold in the British Virgin Islands, Argentina, United Kingdom, the Netherlands, Austria, Spain, Italy, the Czech Republic, Romania, Bulgaria, Greece, Latvia, Lithuania, Belarus, Ukraine, Russia, Azerbaijan, Israel, Thailand, Malaysia, Hong Kong and Taiwan.

== United States Varieties ==
- More Slim 120s (Full Flavor)
- More Menthol Slim 120s (Full Flavor)
- More Gold Slim 120s (Lights)
- More Silver Menthol Slim 120s (Lights)

== See also ==
- Tobacco smoking
