= PMFTC =

Philippine affiliate of Philip Morris International

PMFTC, Inc.
- Type: Subsidiary
- Predecessors: Fortune Tobacco Corporation (1965–2010); Philip Morris Philippines Manufacturing Inc. (1993–2010)
- Founded: February 25, 2010; 16 years ago
- Headquarters: Taguig (head office); Tanauan, Batangas (main plant); Marikina (second plant, formerly FTC main plant)
- Key people: Lucio C. Tan, Sr. (Chairman); Gijs Lambert Johan de Best (President)
- Products: Cigarettes
- Brands: Chesterfield; Fortune International; Hope Luxury; Marlboro; More; Philip Morris
- Number of employees: 4,700
- Parent: Philip Morris International; LT Group

PMFTC, Inc. is the Philippine affiliate of Philip Morris International (PMI). Owned 50-50 by PMI and local conglomerate LT Group, PMFTC is the leading cigarette manufacturer in the Philippines, controlling over 90% of the local market, commercialising the brands Marlboro, Chesterfield, Fortune International, Hope Luxury, and More, among others.

The company is a joint-venture between the Philippine unit of PMI and local firm Fortune Tobacco Corporation (FTC), which joined forces in 2010 to form a new company that, after the agreement, would control the 90% of the market.

== History ==
=== Philip Morris International ===
In 1955, Philip Morris International entered into a licensing agreement with La Suerte Cigar and Cigarette Factory to manufacture and sell Marlboro cigarettes in the Philippines.

In 1993, Philip Morris Philippines, Inc. (PMPI) was established to handle all sales and marketing aspects related to the Marlboro and Philip Morris brands.

In 2002, the licensing agreement with La Suerte was terminated and Philip Morris Philippines Manufacturing, Inc. (PMPMI) was established to handle all aspects of the Philippine business, including manufacturing operations. PMPI was subsequently merged with PMPMI. A new factory located in Tanauan, Batangas was inaugurated by PMPMI in 2003.

=== Fortune Tobacco Corporation ===
Fortune Tobacco Corporation (FTC) was established in April 1965, founded by Benito Tan Kee Hiong, Atty. Florencio N. Santos, Lucio Tan and Mariano Tanenglian. Its factory is based in Barrio Parang, Marikina.

In late 1967, the factory was nearly destroyed by Typhoon Welming, but managed to recover due in part to the success of its initial brands of cigarettes: Evercool, Boss, Jaguar and Champion. By 1968, FTC acquired the Vigan-based Northern Tobacco Redrying Corporation.

In 1974, FTC acquired Macario Palanca's Sylvana Tobacco Corp. in Marikina, simultaneously gaining Sylvana's exclusive licensing agreement with R. J. Reynolds Tobacco Company to manufacture and distribute RJR brand cigarettes in the Philippine market. By 1980, FTC was the largest cigarette manufacturer in the country, and according to data from The Washington Post, its total revenue for 1979 was $270 million; in spite of its revenue size, FTC's failure to submit financial statements has resulted in the company not being listed in Business Day's "Top 1000 Corporations in the Philippines" since 1971. British American Tobacco credited FTC's high market share to "unfair and discriminating laws to favor Fortune", with practices such as its classification of international brands as local brands in order to obtain lower tax duties and acquire a pricing advantage. The company president during the 1970s and 1980s was former Metrocom commander Mariano G. Ordoñez.

On the morning of June 27, 2000, a helicopter owned by FTC was being piloted by 28-year-old employee Reginaldo "Reggie" Bunag, by then a councilor of Rodriguez, Rizal, with his wife Marilyn as passenger when it crashed by a river near the Philrock Quarry in Barangay San Isidro, Rodriguez after becoming entangled in high-tension wires. Both Bunag and Marilyn perished from the crash, with FTC being fined and faced with suspension as a result of the incident.

In 2005, a sitio of Barangay Parang in Marikina that has served as the location of Fortune Tobacco's factory is split off to become Barangay Fortune, named after the company. The separation was later confirmed by Republic Act No. 9431 in April 2007. Previous efforts to create a Barangay Fortune date back to 1983, when a parliamentary bill was filed during the Interim Batasang Pambansa; one of two Parang Elementary Schools was renamed Fortune Elementary School for disambiguation in February 1989 by Republic Act 6705.

=== PMFTC ===
On February 25, 2010, PMI and Fortune Tobacco Corporation (FTC) signed an agreement to unite their respective business activities by transferring selected assets and liabilities of both companies to a new company named PMFTC, Inc., with each party holding an equal economic interest. The agreement stated that PMI retained its export business, while FTC kept its interest in the distribution of the Winston brand of Japan Tobacco. PMFTC would not be affected by pending tax and ownership disputes with local courts involving FTC.

On June 1, 2021, when PMFTC Inc., which the group indirectly owns through Fortune Tobacco Corporation, obtained board approval to merge with Philip Morris Philippines Manufacturing, Inc. and PMFTC would be the surviving corporation.

== Brands ==
=== PMI brands ===
- Bowling Gold
- Bowling Green
- Chesterfield
- L&M
- Marlboro
- Miller
- Philip Morris
- Stork
- IQOS
- ZYN

=== FTC brands ===
- Boss
- Champion
- Fortune International
- Hope Luxury
- Jackpot International
- Mark
- More
- Terra
- Westpoint
