= Calidad Pascual =

Spanish dairy company

Calidad Pascual S.A.U.
- Trade name: Calidad Pascual
- Formerly: Grupo Leche Pascual (1969–2014)
- Type: Private
- Industry: Food processing
- Founded: 1969; 57 years ago
- Founder: Tomás Pascual
- Headquarters: Madrid, Spain
- Area served: Worldwide
- Products: Dairy products
- Revenue: 980 millions €
- Website: www.calidadpascual.com

Calidad Pascual S.A.U. (formerly known as Grupo Leche Pascual) is a Spanish dairy company based in Madrid, Spain. The company was founded as Grupo Leche Pascual in 1969 by Tomás Pascual. It changed its name to Calidad Pascual ("Quality Pascual") in January 2014.

Grupo Leche Pascual logo used until January 2014.

== History ==
In 1969, Leche Pascual was born in Aranda de Duero, Burgos, the result of its founder's entrepreneurial and innovative vision, Don Tomás Pascual Sanz. Since its birth, the company has offered new products year after year. Pioneer since its inception, Pascual was the first company to market long-lasting milk in the Spanish market. He also introduced Tetra Brik packaged milk. Later it was the first brand to release skim milk and then semi-skim milk.

Shortly after, the company began a stage of diversification, going from being a company that only produced milk to gradually enter other sectors. Thus, with the purchase of the Bezoya, Agua de Cardó, and Zambra springs, the group positioned itself strongly in the mineral water market. The launch of the Zumosol brand quickly made the company the leader in the juice market.

Shortly after came the turn of butter, cream and milks with juice through the launch of Bio Frutas (today, Bifrutas), creating a new category of functional foods. Another of the company's great technological innovation milestones was the launch of the ultrapasteurized liquid egg, the risk of salmonella disappearing completely.

In 1994, Pascual began its international expansion, focused mainly on the export of pasteurized yogurts and long-lasting desserts. Pascual obtained in 199 the Grade A approval granted by the US FDA (Food & Drug Administration) for the export of pasteurized yogurts to the United States, becoming the first company, outside the United States, to achieve the highest quality certification of the administration American

The entry into the 21st century began with the launch in 2002 of Vivesoy, soy-based drinks, and juices, creator of a new category of vegetable drinks in the Spanish consumer market, while in 2003 MásVital, the first food, was born Pascual prebiotic.

In 2005, Pascual once again pioneered the launch of the first aseptic PET plastic bottle for packaging of Uperisada Milk, ensuring the same quality in this new packaging as tetra brik. That same year, it launched its new product line Zumos Pascual, the first freshly squeezed orange juice on the market that does not need cold thanks to the latest technology in its production.

2006 is remembered for the death of Don Tomás Pascual Sanz, founder of the company, producing a generational change in ownership with the incorporation to the presidency of his eldest son Tomás Pascual Gómez-Cuétara, who had been occupying the position of CEO since 1996 .

The Tomás Pascual Sanz Institute sees the light in 2007, an entity designed to maintain the legacy of the founder in pursuit of health and quality of life, having since focused its activity on the dissemination of healthy habits, nutrition and health until 2017, year of celebrating its X anniversary.

A year later, Pascual's effort to advance in the management of its human resources is endorsed with the EFR certification, Family Responsible Company.

Year 2010 stands out for the acquisition of Mocay caffé to develop the Pascual hotel offer. During this stage, the company continues to focus on improving its management systems with the integral quality as a flag, as guaranteed in 2012 obtaining the seal of European excellence 400 + EFQM

In 2013, Pascual created the company Qualianza, as a distribution company for its products as well as the brands with which it reaches alliances. In this way, Qualianza Integral Distribution Services will allow the company's commercial activity to be extended. The launch of the DiaBalance food product range for diabetics is also taking place, as a result of the partnership with Esteve Laboratories. Likewise, Pascual obtains the Five Star Ecostar environmental certification for its sustainable fleet, as well as the “Equality in the Company” badge of the Ministry of Health, Social Services and Equality.

Year 2014 marks a before and after with the presentation of the company's new corporate identity, becoming known as Pascual Quality. The following year, Pascual Quality reinforces its commitment to hospitality, one of its strategic commercial channels, with the launch of “Extra Creme” Easter milk, a specialized milk for the hospitality channel.

2016 was the year in which Pascual Quality extended its conception of innovation to the whole society through its Pascual Startup initiative, which supports Spanish entrepreneurs with ideas related to the agri-food sector. On the other hand, in the month of October, Pascual Quality enters the Royal Order of Sports Merit for its support of the Olympic sport. As for the launches, examples such as the new 0% Skimmed Easter Milk, ColaCao Shake or the new Zero Forks attest to the commitment to innovation.

The year 2017 saw a period of change, of consolidation of leadership, a new organizational structure and advances in the objective of digital transformation and the extension of an innovative culture throughout the organization. The challenges were not only to value the products, but also all the initiatives focused on improving the value chain and relations with all the company's stakeholders through an ethical, responsible management approach.

In February 2024, the Spanish Audiencia Nacional fined Calidad Pascual with 8.56 million euros for forming a cartel with other dairy companies to avoid competition when buying milk from Spanish farmers between 2000 and 2013. The farmers can now further sue for damages.

== Products ==
- Pascual (milk, butter, yogurt, shakes and sweetened whipped cream)
- Vivesoy (vegetable drinks)
- Bezoya (mineral water)
- Bifrutas (milk and fruit juice)
- Mocay caffè (coffee for catering)
