= MRC Allied =

Property development firm in the Philippines

- Type: Public (PSE:MRC)
- Traded as: MRC
- Industry: Property development, Mining
- Founded: Manila, Philippines (1977)
- Headquarters: Makati, Philippines
- Key people: Jimmy T. Yaokasin (chairman); Augusto M. Cosio, Jr. (President & CEO); Al Joseph C. De Guzman (COO)
- Owner: Menlo Capital Corp. (51.54%); PCD Nominee Corp. (44.51%); Other Investors (3.95%)
- Website: mrcallied.com

MRC Allied Inc. (MRC) is a property development firm in the Philippines. It is a publicly listed property development firm which has a position in the development of master planned, integrated residential, commercial, recreational, tourism and industrial areas within a single community or township.

== History ==
MRC Allied, Inc. (MRC) is the first publicly listed property development firm in the Philippines which has found its niche in development of master planned, integrated residential, commercial, recreational, tourism and industrial areas within a single community or township.

Incorporated on November 20, 1990, and formerly known as Makilala Rubber Corporation, the activities of MRC have been primarily on processing and export of baled natural rubber. In 1993, MRC diversified into a real property development firm, more particularly, into township development. The Securities & Exchange Commission (SEC) approved the change of name of Makilala Rubber Corporation to MRC Allied Industries, Inc. on October 25, 1994.

In 1995, MRC listed its entire 500 million shares in the Philippine Stock Exchange (PSE) with an initial public offering share price of three pesos (P3.00) per share. MRC decided to divest its rubber business to Makrubber Corporation in 1997, its wholly owned subsidiary, to focus on its core business – real property development. Makrubber had to stop its operations in 2000 due to the Land Reform Program and the peace and order problems in North Cotabato.

Since 2000, MRC has continued and maintained its two eco-friendly projects: the New Cebu Township One (NCTO) of Naga, Cebu; and Amihan Woodlands Township (AWT) of Northern Leyte.

In 2010, MRC has ventured into the mining exploration industry acquiring various mining assets located in the provinces of Davao del Sur, Sultan Kudarat, Surigao del Sur, and Davao Oriental.

In 2015, MRC decided to diversify its portfolio and revealed its plan to venture into the renewable energy sector through the a newly created subsidiary Menlo Renewable Energy Corporation and is set to implement its very first renewable energy project – the 60MW Solar Project in Naga City, Cebu.

== MRC Allied portfolio ==
Property Development

The company has two land banks consisting of 160 hectare industrial estate in Naga City, Cebu known as the New Cebu Township One (NCTO) and 700 hectares of raw land in San Isidro Municipality, Leyte known as Amihan Woodlands Township (AWT).

Both parcels of land are registered with the Philippine Economic Zone Authority (PEZA). Based on the latest appraisal, the properties have a fair market value of Php1.5 billion.

The New Cebu Township One (NCTO) Ecozone

The New Cebu Township One (NCTO) represents MRC's first major property development undertaking. As a master-planned economic zone designed by renowned Jurong Town Corporation, NCTO is envisioned to become a wholly integrated community, which contains a light industry, processing zone, residential, commercial and recreational areas.

Located in the heart of Naga City, Cebu and about thirty five (35) kilometers away from the Mactan International Airport, the NCTO is registered with the Philippine Economic Zone Authority (PEZA) as a special economic zone. At present, the lead locator in the park is Kinseki Ltd., a Japanese manufacturer of Quartz and Crystal devices. Other major locators are Seagate Technology, Inc. of the United States, Air Liquide of France and AP Precisions Philippines, Inc. Further development is required to fully maximize the value of this 50-hectare property.

Within the ecozone, MRC also plans to develop its 50 megawatt solar power plant that can either supply electricity to the Visayas grid and offer its power to consumers within and around Naga City, Cebu. The solar farm is currently in its pre-development phase.

The Amihan Woodlands Township (AWT)

Located in the Municipality of San Isidro, Leyte with a lot area of around 732 hectares, the Amihan Woodlands Township (AWT) Inc. was originally planned as an eco-residential and eco-tourism project with economic zone status. However, the company was negatively affected by the 1997 Asian financial crisis and due to its present financial condition, no major development of the property has been undertaken.

The open spaces and woodlands consist of the natural forest, mangrove swamps, beaches and marine preserves which will be protected sanctuaries and which will serve as the centerpoint of the property development. The residential areas for locators are divided into three districts. The large mixed-use areas will contain commercial, recreational and residential zones. It can accommodate locators and investors to establish resort facilities, hotels, and condominiums, and world class golf courses.

The industrial park will permit light industrial activities and other parallel uses. This will also be the site of the port operation facilities of the seaport and the airport. The remaining areas are reserved for infrastructure facilities and utilities which include an airport, seaport/marina, a lake/water reservoir, and road network.

== Subsidiaries ==
Mining

- Mining Exploration - The abundant mineral deposits and recent government pronouncements prompted MRC to pursue the opportunity for a shift in business strategy. Global trends in metal prices and the preference for gold as the stable reserve definitely add value to mining resources available worldwide. Key acquisitions by MRC over the last several years include mining assets in various areas of Tampakan, Surigao, Davao and Boston-Cateel Mines with an aggregate area of over 25,000 hectares.
- MRC Tampakan Mines

Area: 7,955 hectares Minerals: Copper Gold Location: Kiblawan, Davao del Sur and Columbio, Sultan Kudarat

MRC Tampakan Project is MRC's flagship venture into mining exploration. This copper-gold tenement is situated next to Xstrata's Tampakan project in Mindanao – the largest copper-gold reserve in Asia and the 5th largest the world, which project explores 2.4 billion tonnes grading at 0.6% copper and over 15 million ounces of gold.

- MRC Surigao Mines

Area: 3,718 hectares Minerals: Copper, Gold Location: Marihatag, Surigao del Sur

Located within the famed "Gold Belt" of the south part of the Philippines, the MRC Surigao Copper-Gold Project is the company's second mining acquisition.

- MRC Davao Mines

Area: 8,470 hectares Minerals: Copper, Gold Location: Paquibato, Davao Del Norte

The MRC Davao Gold-Copper Project is located southeast of the Bukidnon-Davao porphyry copper-gold prospect of Indophil Resources NL within the Central Mindanao Cordillera region.

- MRC Boston-Cateel

Area: 9,720 hectares Minerals: Gold Location: Boston, Davao Oriental and Cateel, Davao Oriental

This is MRC's fourth mining asset acquisition and is situated at the foot of Mt. Diwalwal, an area with proven Gold reserves, neighboring both small-scale and large-scale active mining projects.

In March 11,2022 MRC Allied Inc sold Tampakan Copper-Gold Project and Marihatag Copper-Gold Project in Tampakan, Davao Del Sur, and the Boston-Cateel Copper-Gold Project and Paquibato Copper-Gold Project in Davao Oriental and Davao Del Norte to Salvador “Buddy” Zamora, brother of Manuel “Manny” Zamora and Congressman Ronaldo “Ronnie” Zamora of the Zamora family, the Zamora family owns Nickel Asia Corporation, the largest nickel corporation in the Philippines.

Renewable energy - The renewable energy projects of the company will be pursued mainly through its subsidiary Menlo Renewable Energy Corporation (MREN) and other affiliates

- 60 MW Naga Solar Project

MREN will develop at least 60MW solar power plant within its property in Naga City, Cebu that can either supply electricity to the Visayas grid and/or offer its production to large power consumers within and around Southern Cebu. The project is currently in its pre-development phase and the development thereof is estimated at PhP3 billion.

Location: Naga City, Cebu Capacity: 60MW

- 100 MW Clark Solar Project

The Bases Conversion and Development Authority (BCDA), Sunray Power, Inc. (SPI) and Menlo Renewable Energy Corp. recently launched a partnership that will develop a 100MW solar power plant inside the Clark Green City in Tarlac. The large solar power project will generate power to be consumed by the locators of the Clark Green City and the development thereof will be worth at least Php11.75 billion.

Location: Clark Pampanga Capacity: 100MW
