= Tanduay Distillers =

Alcohol beverage company in the Philippines

- Type: Subsidiary
- Industry: Distilled beverage
- Founded: 1854; 172 years ago
- Headquarters: 348 J. Nepomuceno St., San Miguel District, Quiapo, Manila, Philippines
- Area served: Worldwide
- Key people: Lucio Tan (President); Nestor Mendones (Senior Vice President and Chief Financial Officer)
- Products: Rum, Ethyl alcohol
- Number of employees: 403 (2024)
- Parent: LT Group, Inc.
- Website: www.tanduay.com

Tanduay Distillers, Inc. (Tagalog pronunciation: [tanˈduʔaɪ, -ˈdwaɪ]) is a Philippine alcoholic beverage company founded in 1854. It is a subsidiary of LT Group, a conglomerate owned by Filipino business magnate Lucio Tan. As of 2021, it is the world's largest rum brand.

== History ==
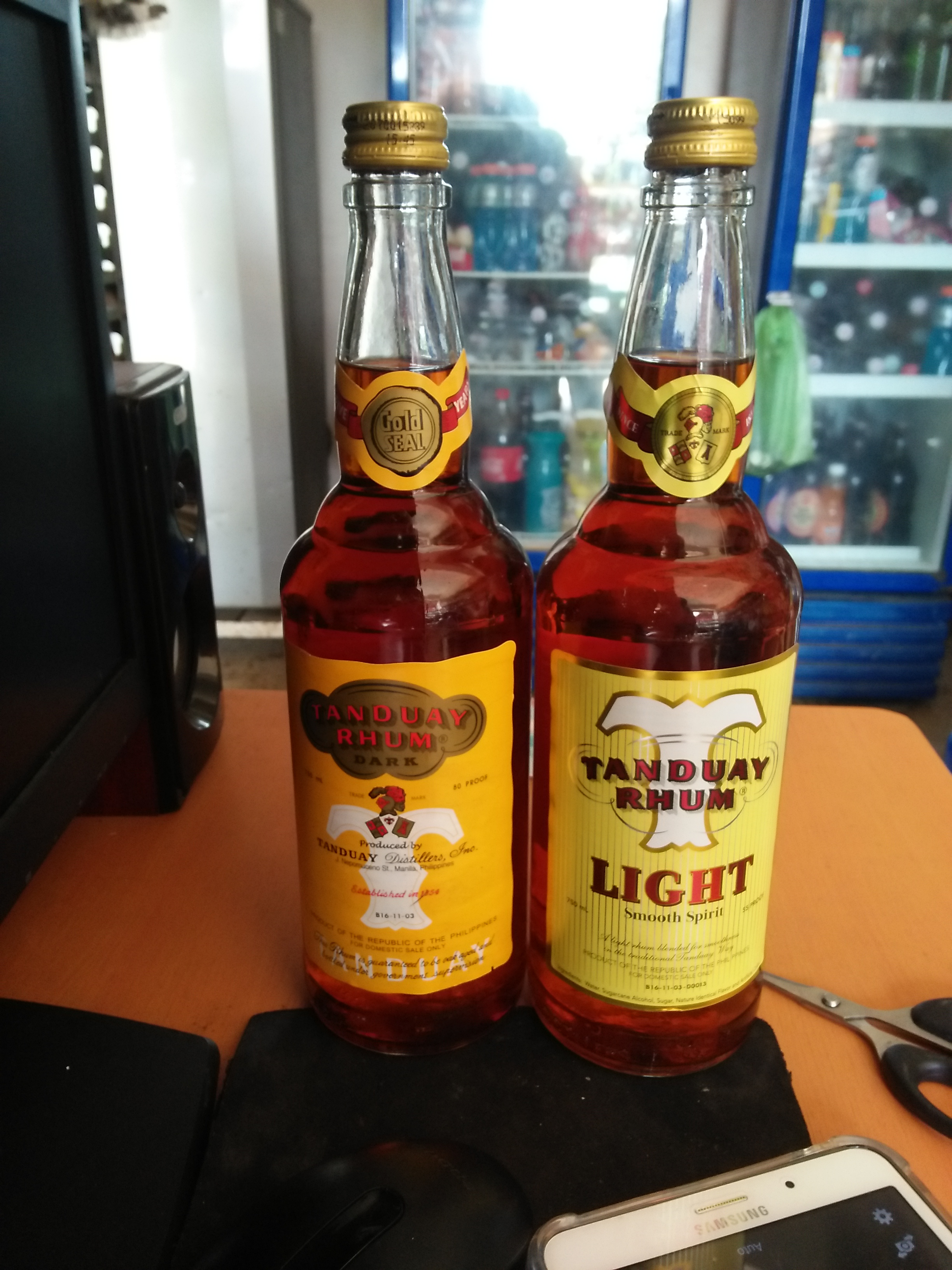
Bottles of Tanduay Rhum Dark and Tanduay Light

Tanduay traces its origins to a distillery in Hagonoy, Bulacan, originally owned by Elías Menchatorre. In 1856, the distillery was acquired by Valentín Teus e Yrisarry and brought into Ynchausti y Compañía. Although the Hagonoy distillery was already operational by the time of the acquisition, Ynchausti y Compañía decided to use its own foundation date (1854) as the distillery's founding date. Six years later, a rectifying plant was built on Isla de Tanduay (since connected to the city), bordering the Quiapo and San Miguel districts of Manila, becoming the original Tanduay distillery. To this day, the Ynchausti Family coat-of-arms remains on every bottle of Tanduay.

Early products of the two distilleries have no recorded of brand names or distinctive labels, and were likely sold under generic names: "aguardiente" (Spanish for firewater), "tubâ" (palm wine) and "ron" (Spanish for rum). Other early distillery records list its rum simply as "ron de destillería de Hagonoy y Tanduay" (literally, “rum from the distillery of Hagonoy and Tanduay”).

By the 1900s, production would shift to the Manila distillery. By the 1930s, the rum it produced became branded as Tanduay Rhum, repackaged in smaller 375 mL and 750 mL glass bottles, replacing the 10 gallon damajuanas (demijohns).

=== Tanduay Distillery, Inc. ===
In 1934 and 1935, Elizalde & Company, a new company established by the grandchildren of Joaquín Marcelino Elizalde e Yrisarry (one of the original minority partners of Ynchausti y Compañía) acquired some major business assets of Ynchausti & Compañía including the Tanduay distillery, after Manuel de Ynchausti divested key assets of Ynchausti y Compañia. Under the Elizalde group, the Tanduay distillery successfully operated under the corporate name Tanduay Distillery, Inc., producing quality rum and other distilled spirits for both domestic and international markets.

=== Tanduay Distillers, Inc. ===
On May 18, 1988, Twin Ace Holdings Corporation, a company owned by Lucio Tan, acquired the Tanduay trademark and related assets of Tanduay Distillery, Inc. from Elizalde & Company, Inc. The new management launched a plant modernization and expansion program that increased distillery production capacity by almost 50 times. On July 30, 1999, Twin Ace Holdings changed its corporate name to Tanduay Distillers, Inc. Aside from rum, Tanduay Distillers, Inc. also produces gin, vodka, brandy, and whiskey.

Subsidiaries:

- Asian Alcohol Corporation
- Absolut Distillers, Inc. (formerly, Absolut Chemicals, Inc.)

=== LT Group, Inc. ===
On July 8, 1999, Asian Pacific Equity Corporation (PSE: APEC), a company also owned and controlled by Lucio Tan, acquired 100% ownership of Twin Ace Holdings Corporation via a share swap with Twin Ace's existing shareholders. On November 10, 1999, APEC changed its corporate name to Tanduay Holdings, Inc. (PSE: TDY) and increased authorized capital from ₱1 billion to ₱5 billion at a par value of ₱1.00 per share. In October 2012, Tanduay Holdings, Inc. was renamed LT Group, Inc. (PSE: LTG).

== Heritage ==
=== Coat of arms ===
The Tanduay coat-of-arms has appeared on the label of Tanduay-branded products since the time of Tanduay Distillery, Inc. (predecessor of the current company, Tanduay Distillers, Inc.). It features two escutcheons (shields), the left-hand one based on arms of the Ynchausti Family, the original owners of the Tanduay distillery.

=== The original Tanduay distillery ===
The original Tanduay distillery located on Calle Tanduay (now J. Nepomuceno Street) in Quiapo, Manila, has been Tanduay's prime production facility until it was decommissioned in April 2013. Tanduay Distillers, Inc. announced that production will be relocated to a larger facility located in Cabuyao, Laguna, capable of producing 100,000 cases a day, over triple the original distillery's daily production capacity of 30,000 cases. Parts of the original distillery will be converted into a museum to showcase the history and heritage of Tanduay. The distillery may also be reopened to serve as backup production facility.

=== Etymology ===
The original Tanduay distillery adopted its name from its original location on Isla de Tanduay, a triangular area in Manila bounded by the esteros (inlet canals) of San Miguel and San Sebastián. "Tanduay" comes from the word tangwáy, the Tagalog word for "peninsula" that also meant "low-lying land", as the area and nearby Quiapo were often flooded during the rainy season. In Cebuano, tanguay referred to a place where tubâ (palm wine) is bought and sold.

== Marketing ==
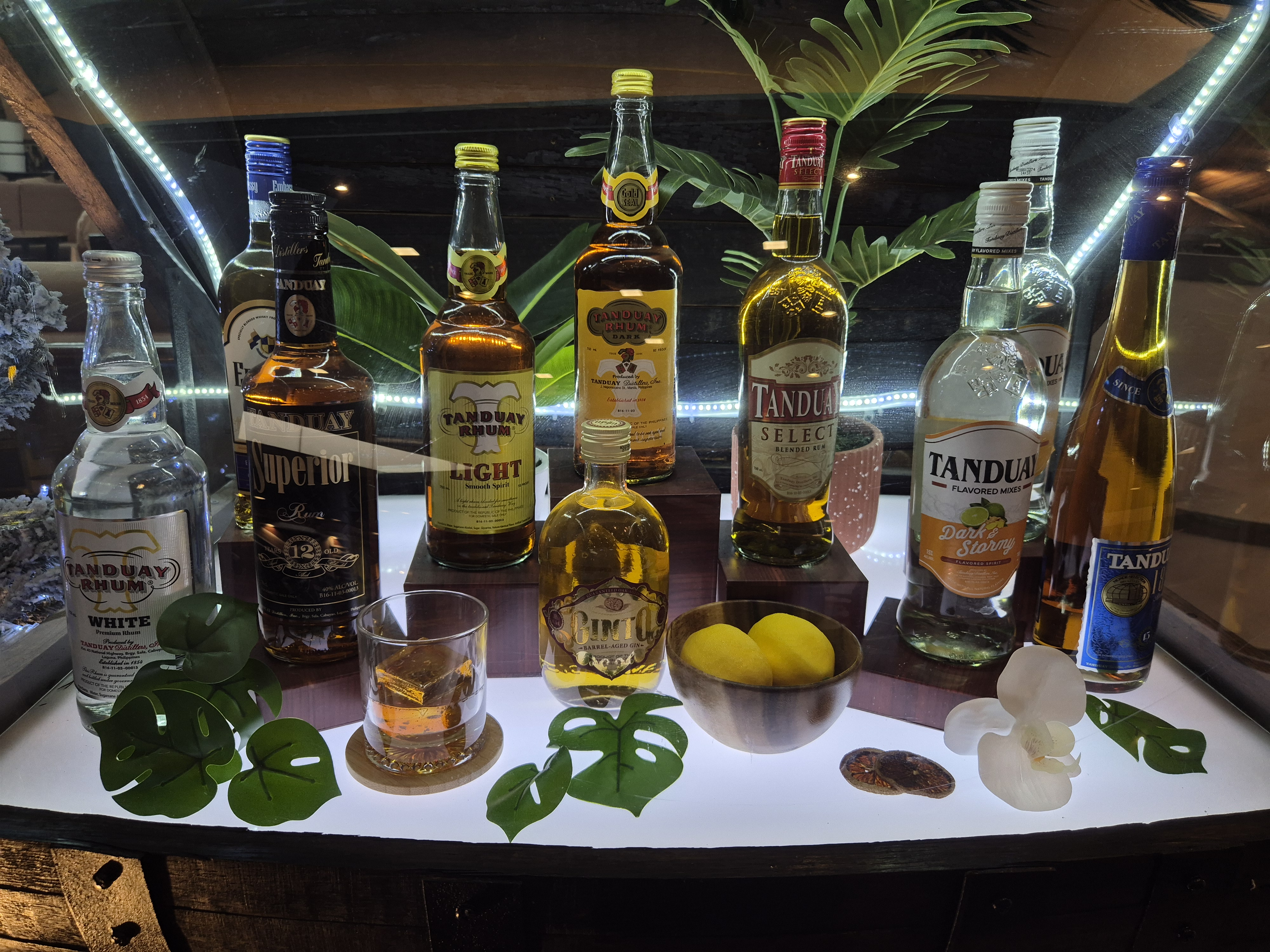
Several Tanduay rum bottles on display in a hotel

=== NBA sponsorship ===
In March 2017, Tanduay became the first Philippine brand to have a major sponsorship deal with a National Basketball Association team and arena. The partnership will designate Tanduay as the official rum of Barclays Center and the Brooklyn Nets, as well as the presenting sponsor of the venue's 40/40 Club & Restaurant for the remainder of the 2016–17 NBA season. Additionally, Tanduay Rhum will be an associate sponsor of the arena's Brooklyn Show platform and will have a variety of signage integrated throughout the venue.

In October 2017, Tanduay signed a two-year partnership with the Golden State Warriors, designating Tanduay as the presenting sponsor of various games of the Warriors including the Warriors' Filipino Heritage Night on October 29, 2017. The partnership will run from the 2017–18 NBA season until the end of the 2018–19 NBA season. Additionally, Tanduay will benefit from a variety of signage integrated throughout the Warriors home venue, the Oracle Arena.

On January 22, 2021, Tanduay signed a three-year sponsorship deal with the Milwaukee Bucks, designating Tanduay as the official rum of the Bucks. In April 2021, Tanduay entered a partnership with the Phoenix Suns.

=== Calendar girls ===
Tanduay's tradition of making annual calendars featuring female celebrities started in 1989 with actress Alma Moreno as their first calendar model. Women showcased in their calendars often pose in revealing outfits that highlight their physical beauty. These calendars serve as a promotional tool and are prominently displayed in barbershops, sari-sari stores, grocery stores, and other locations popular among liquor consumers.

== Ethyl alcohol ==
In March 2020 during the COVID-19 pandemic, the LT Group, Inc. started producing the Help Flows brand of 70% ethyl alcohol under Absolut Distillers, Inc. The denatured solution, packaged in Tanduay’s signature lapád (“wide”) 375mL glass flasks and in 4L plastic jugs, was not for commercial sale and instead distributed to frontliners in medical facilities and communities, along with Help Flows distilled water by Asia Brewery, Inc. This was to help address frequent nationwide shortages of potable water and antiseptics during the country’s long lockdowns.

== See also ==
- Ynchausti y Compañia
- Tanduay Rhum Masters (PBA team)
- Tanduay Light Rhum Masters (PBA D-League team)
- Batangas City Tanduay Athletics (MPBL team)
