= Allied Banking Corporation =

Defunct Philippines bank

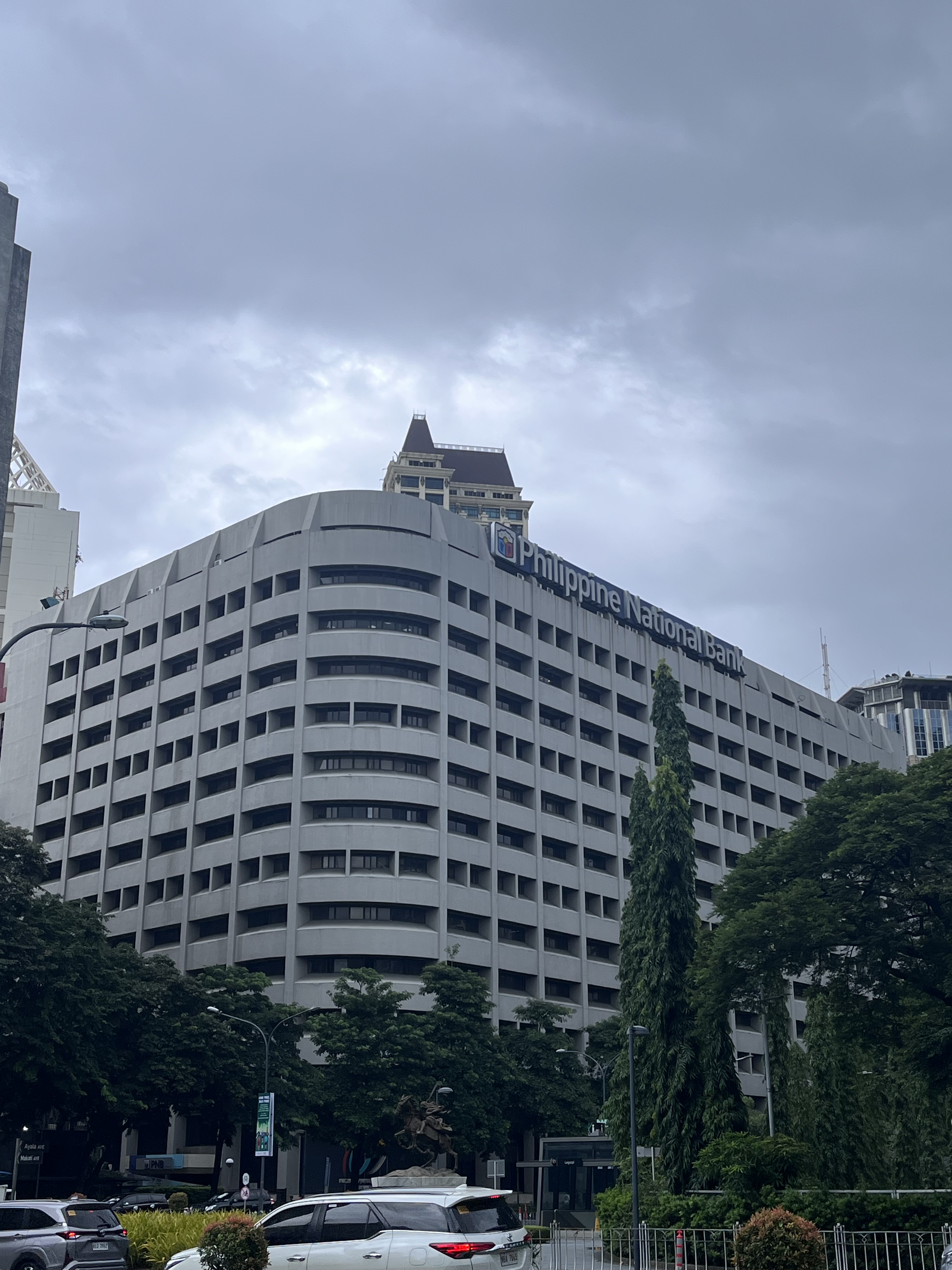
- Allied Bank Center along Ayala Avenue, Makati (photographed in 2023), former headquarters of Allied Banking Corporation
- Type: Private
- Industry: Banking, Finance and Insurance
- Founded: April 11, 1977; 49 years ago in Manila, Philippines
- Defunct: February 9, 2013; 13 years ago
- Fate: Acquired by (and later merged into) Philippine National Bank
- Successor: Philippine National Bank
- Headquarters: Makati, Philippines
- Key people: Domingo T. Chua, Chairman; Anthony Q. Chua, President
- Products: Financial services
- Net income: ₱1.325 billion (▲4%) (2004)

Allied Banking Corporation was one of the largest banks in the Philippines. On February 9, 2013, the bank was merged with Philippine National Bank, creating the fourth largest private domestic bank in the Philippines.

== History ==
As a spinoff from the acquisition of the insolvent General Bank and Trust for a pittance, Allied Bank was incorporated under the laws of the Republic of the Philippines on April 11, 1977, and granted by the Central Bank of the Philippines the Certificate of Authority to operate as a commercial bank on May 20, 1977. It formally opened for business on June 2, 1977. On August 19, 1977, it was authorized to operate an expanded foreign currency deposit unit (FCDU) and in December 1981 granted to operate as expanded commercial bank or universal bank. As of December 31, 2007, Allied Bank was the 9th largest private domestic commercial bank in the country in terms of total deposits, and the 10th largest in terms of net worth.

Aside from its 288 domestic branches/offices, Allied Bank had two off-shore (OBU) branches in Bahrain and Guam; a wholly owned subsidiary in the United Kingdom (Allied Bank (UK) Plc); a majority-owned subsidiary in Hong Kong (Allied Banking Corporation (Hong Kong), Ltd.); a majority-owned commercial bank subsidiary in Xiamen, China (Allied Commercial Bank), and an affiliate commercial bank based in San Francisco, California, United States with a branch in Guam (Oceanic Bank). Representative offices were established in Australia, Germany, Italy, Japan, Singapore, and Spain.

In the Philippines, the universal banking group of Allied Bank included a wholly owned savings bank, the Allied Savings Bank, wholly owned Allied Forex Corp., and an affiliate Allied Leasing and Finance Corporation.

On December 7, 2007, the Supreme Court of the Philippines affirmed a judgment dismissing the state's sequestration of Lucio Tan's companies: "There can be no question that indeed, petitioner's (the government's) orders of sequestration are void and have no legal effect." The landmark decision would trigger a planned merger between Philippine National Bank (PNB) and Tan's Allied Banking Corporation. Edgar Bancod, research head, ATR-Kim Eng Securities, stated that the merged bank would become the country's fourth biggest after Metropolitan Bank & Trust Co., Banco de Oro-EPCIB, and the Bank of the Philippine Islands.

On February 9, 2013, the PNB-Allied Bank merger was completed, adopting the name Philippine National Bank. Florencia Tarriela became chairman and Omar Byron Mier became the chief executive of the merged bank.

== Subsidiaries and affiliates ==
=== Domestic bank affiliates ===
Logo of Allied Savings Bank, a subsidiary of PNB Savings Bank

- Allied Bankers Insurance Corporation
- Allied Leasing and Finance Corporation
- Allied Savings Bank

=== International bank affiliates ===
- Allied Bank Philippines (UK) Plc
- Allied Banking Corporation (Hong Kong) Ltd.
- Allied Commercial Bank
- Oceanic Bank

== Competition ==
Allied Bank's main competitors were major Philippine banks like Metrobank, Bank of the Philippine Islands (BPI), Banco de Oro (BDO) and Landbank.

== See also ==
- Philippine National Bank
