= List of tallest buildings in Cagayan de Oro =

This article lists the tallest buildings in Metro Cagayan de Oro in the southern island of Mindanao in the Philippines.

== Tallest completed buildings ==
This list ranks the buildings in Metro Cagayan de Misamis that have at least 8 floors or stand at least 94 feet (29 m) tall. This includes spires and architectural details but does not include antenna masts. If there is no data available, the list ranks buildings according to the number of floors.

Rank	Name	Height (m)	Floors	Year of Completion	Location	Notes
1	Avida Towers Aspira Tower 2	115 m (377 ft)	33	2023	Ramon Chavez St, Cagayan de Oro	Currently, the tallest building in the city and the entire region
2	Avida Towers Aspira Tower 1	105 m (344 ft)	29	2018	Ramon Chavez St, Cagayan de Oro	
3	The Loop North Tower at Limketkai Center	97.13 m (318.7 ft)	26	2018	Limketkai Center, Cagayan de Oro	The Loop is Vista Residences' first high-rise development outside Metro Manila
4	Avida Centrio Tower	83 m (272 ft)	24	2016	Corrales Ave, Cagayan de Oro	The first high-rise condominium in the city
5	Limketkai Luxe Hotel	78 m (256 ft)	19	2013	Limketkai Center, Cagayan de Oro	It was the first high-rise and the tallest until the year 2016, and it is the tallest and biggest hotel in CDO. Endorsed as the first Gold Hotel in the Philippines, it has also been certified as the first LEED
6	SM CDO Downtown Tower	75 m (246 ft)	12	2018	Osmena St, Cagayan de Oro	The tallest office tower building in the city
6	New Dawn Plus Hotel	75 m (246 ft)	20	2017	Don Apolinar Velez St, Cagayan de Oro	
7	Mesaverte Residences Tower 1	60 m (200 ft)	16	2018	Osmena Ext, Street, Cagayan de Oro	
7	Mesaverte Residences Tower 2	60 m (200 ft)	16	2018	Osmena Ext, Street, Cagayan de Oro	
7	Mesaverte Residences Tower 3	60 m (200 ft)	16	2018	Osmena Ext, Street, Cagayan de Oro	
8	ACE Medical Center	44 m (144 ft)	12	2023	Rosario Limketkai Ave, Cagayan de Oro	The tallest hospital in the city
9	Seda Centrio Hotel	42 m (138 ft)	12	2012	Corrales Ave, Cagayan de Oro	
10	Primavera City Città Verde Tower A	41 m (135 ft)	12	2022	Pedro N. Roa Senior Ave, Cagayan de Oro	
10	Primavera City Città Verde Tower B	41 m (135 ft)	12	2022	Pedro N. Roa Senior Ave, Cagayan de Oro	
10	Primavera City Città Bella Tower C	41 m (135 ft)	12	2024	Pedro N. Roa Senior Ave, Cagayan de Oro	
10	Primavera City Città Bella Tower D	41 m (135 ft)	12	2024	Pedro N. Roa Senior Ave, Cagayan de Oro	
11	Limketkai Gateway Tower 1	38 m (125 ft)	8	2009	Limketkai Center, Cagayan de Oro	
11	Limketkai Gateway Tower 2	38 m (125 ft)	8	2016	Limketkai Center, Cagayan de Oro	
12	Red Planet Hotel	36.6 m (120 ft)	12	2013	Claro M. Recto Ave, Cagayan de Oro	
12	Mallberry Suites	36.6 m (120 ft)	10	2009	Limketkai Center, Cagayan de Oro	
12	USTP Engineering Complex	36.6 m (120 ft)	8	2014	Claro M. Recto Ave, Gusa, Cagayan de Oro	
12	Centrio Corporate Center	36.6 m (120 ft)	7	2012	Claro M. Recto Ave, Cagayan de Oro	
13	SM CDO Downtown Mall	36 m (118 ft)	5	2017	Claro M. Recto Ave, Cagayan de Oro	Currently, the biggest SM Supermall in Mindanao
13	St Francis Doctors Hospital and Medical Center	36 m (118 ft)	10		Masterson Ave, Upper Canitoan, Cagayan de Oro	The upper floors are still being constructed. The second-tallest hospital in the city
13	One Providence	36 m (118 ft)	10	2016	Julio Pacana Street, Cagayan de Oro	
14	Primavera Residences Tower A	35.5 m (116 ft)	10	2013	Trade Street Pueblo de Oro Business Park, Cagayan de Oro	The first condominium in Uptown Cagayan de Oro and IDC's first project
14	Primavera Residences Tower B	35.5 m (116 ft)	10	2015	Trade Street Pueblo de Oro Business Park, Cagayan de Oro	The first condominium in Uptown Cagayan de Oro and IDC's first project
15	Stronghold Tower	34 m (112 ft)	9	2022	Tiano, Yacapin St, Cagayan de Oro	Tallest Insurance Building in Cagayan de Oro and in Region 10
15	Hamersons Hotel	34 m (112 ft)	10	2024	Tomas Saco St, Cagayan de Oro	The second branch after Cebu
16	G-Galyx Hotel	33 m (108 ft)	10	2015	Capt. Vicente Roa St, Cagayan de Oro	
17	D’ Residential Loft Tower 1	31 m (102 ft)	9	2023	Pedro N. Roa Senior Ave, Cagayan de Oro	
18	Cagayan de Oro Polymedic General Hospital	30 m (98 ft)	8		Apolinar Street, Cagayan de Oro	
18	Koresco Condominium	30 m (98 ft)	9	2010	Pueblo de Oro Golf Estates, Masterson Ave, Cagayan de Oro	
19	Maxandrea Hotel	29 m (95 ft)	9	2005	Aguinaldo Street, corner J.R. Borja St, Cagayan de Oro	Formerly the tallest hotel in CDO, 2005-2011
20	Tuscania Tower 3	N/A	8	2019	St Ignatius St, Brgy Kauswagan Cagayan de Oro	
20	One Oasis Bldg 2	N/A	8	2018	Rosario Limketkai Avenue, Brgy. Camaman-an, Cagayan de Oro	
20	Capitol University Medical Center	N/A	8	2008	Claro M. Recto Ave, Cagayan de Oro	
20	Ajirang Condotel	N/A	8	2022	Claro M. Recto Ave, Cagayan de Oro	
20	Lourdes College Building	N/A	8		Capistrano St, Cagayan de Oro	

== In Progress buildings ==
Only buildings that have at least 10 floors, or 30 m
(98 ft), are included in this list.

Name	Height	Floors	Status	Year of completion	Location	Notes and Sources
Limketkai Luxe Hotel Tower 2	159 m (522 ft)	36	On Hold	TBA	Limketkai Center, Cagayan de Oro	According to Jerome dela Fuente, General Manager of Limketkai Luxe Hotel, If the funding aligns, we could see a second tower rising soon
Primavera City Città Alta	105 m (344 ft)	33	Under Construction	2029	Pedro N. Roa Senior Ave, Cagayan de Oro	The last phase of the project. Soon be the tallest skyscraper upon completion, according to Arch. Romolo Nati. Partnership with Citadines
Radisson Blu Hotel & Residences Cagayan de Oro	TBA	30	Groundbreaking Soon	2028	Pacific Street, Pueblo Business Park, Cagayan de Oro	Partnership between AppleOne Group and Radisson Group. The first 5-star Hotel in the region
The Loop South Tower at Limketkai Center	97.13 m (318.7 ft)	26	On-hold	TBA	Limketkai Center, Cagayan de Oro	
Casa Mira Tower 2	90 m (300 ft)	27	Topped-off	2025	Rodolfo N. Pelaez Blvd, Cagayan de Oro	
Capitol Master Tower 1	93 m (305 ft)	26	Proposed	TBA	Corrales Ave, Cagayan de Oro	Joint Venture with Abrown Company Inc. It will also have a 5-storey office building and a 7-storey dormitory and office complex
Capitol Master Tower 2	93 m (305 ft)	26	Proposed	TBA	Corrales Ave, Cagayan de Oro	Joint Venture with Abrown Company Inc. It will also have a 5-storey office building and a 7-storey dormitory and office complex
Masterson Mile North Tower B	95 m (312 ft)	28	Launching Soon	2030	Masterson Ave, Cagayan de Oro	Design by Gensler and Associates and Casas+Architects
Masterson Mile North Tower C	95 m (312 ft)	28	Launching Soon	2032	Masterson Ave, Cagayan de Oro	Design by Gensler and Associates and Casas+Architects
Masterson Mile North Tower A	90 m (300 ft)	26	Launching Soon	2029	Masterson Ave, Cagayan de Oro	Design by Gensler and Associates and Casas+Architects
Masterson Mile North Tower B	90 m (300 ft)	26	Launching Soon	2031	Masterson Ave, Cagayan de Oro	Design by Gensler and Associates and Casas+Architects
Masterson Mile North Tower A	86 m (282 ft)	24	Launching Soon	2030	Masterson Ave, Cagayan de Oro	Design by Gensler and Associates and Casas+Architects
One Manresa Place Tower 2	87 m (285 ft)	26	Under Construction	2030	Manresa Town, Cagayan de Oro	
Hotel 101	81 m (266 ft)	23/25	Proposed	2027	CityMall Bulua, Opol, Diversion, Brgy Bulua, Cagayan de Oro	
Casa Mira Tower 1	76 m (249 ft)	23	Topped-Off	2025	Rodolfo N. Pelaez Blvd, Cagayan de Oro	
Intalio Flats Primea Tower D	66 m (217 ft)	20	Groundbreaking Soon	2029	Eagle St, Brgy Kauswagan, Cagayan de Oro	
Bernwood de Oro	TBA	20	Launching Soon	2028	Max Y. Suniel St, Cagayan de Oro	
Intalio Flats Primea Tower C	57 m (187 ft)	17	Groundbreaking Soon	2028	Eagle St, Brgy Kauswagan, Cagayan de Oro	
One Manresa Place Tower 1	65 m (213 ft)	19	Under Construction	2030	Manresa Town, Cagayan de Oro	
One Manresa Place Tower 3	65 m (213 ft)	19	Under Construction	2030	Manresa Town, Cagayan de Oro	
Firenze Green Tower	54 m (177 ft)	15	Launching Soon	2029	Rosario Limketkai Avenue, Brgy. Lapasan Cagayan de Oro	Italpinas' first high rise development in downtown. Dusit Princess Firenze will also be part of the Firenze Green Tower
Mareion Coast Residences Tower 1	57 m (187 ft)	17	Groundbreaking Soon	2027	Opol, Misamis Oriental	
Mareion Coast Residences Tower 2	57 m (187 ft)	17	Groundbreaking Soon	2029	Opol, Misamis Oriental	
Startup Building	62 m (203 ft)	15	Groundbreaking Soon	TBA	Claro M. Recto Ave, Cagayan de Oro	The project, funded by ADB through DTI and USTP, will cost P3.7 billion and will start next year
Zircon: The Alexandrite Columns	45 m (148 ft)	14	Under Construction	2027	Uptown Metropolis, South Diversion Road, Cagayan de Oro	
Valley View Residences	48 m (157 ft)	14	Under Construction	202?	Sta. Ana, Tagoloan, Misamis Oriental	33 towers with 14 floors each
Intalio Flats Primea Tower A	48 m (157 ft)	14	Topped-Off	2025	Eagle St, Brgy Kauswagan, Cagayan de Oro	
Intalio Flats Primea Tower B	48 m (157 ft)	14	Topped-Off	2025	Eagle St, Brgy Kauswagan, Cagayan de Oro	
Intalio Flats Primea Tower E	N/A	TBA	Proposed	TBA	Eagle St, Brgy Kauswagan, Cagayan de Oro	
Intalio Flats Primea Tower F	N/A	14+	Proposed	TBA	Eagle St, Brgy Kauswagan, Cagayan de Oro	
Belmonde Tower 3	40 m (130 ft)	12	Groundbreaking Soon	2028	The Montage by Vista Estates, Brgy Lumbia, Cagayan de Oro	
Nirvana Village	40 m (130 ft)	12	On Hold	TBA	TBA	The project has moved to a new site.
PHIVIDEC - IA 4PH Housing Project	41 m (135 ft)	12	Under Construction	202?	Sta. Ana, Tagoloan, Misamis Oriental	18 towers with 12 floors each. Part of the PHIVIDEC industrial estate. A joint venture between RGJ Realty and PHIVIDEC
MidTown Tower 1	40 m (130 ft)	12	Groundbreaking Soon	2027	The MidTown by Vista Estates, Brgy Canitoan, Cagayan de Oro	
MidTown Tower 2	40 m (130 ft)	12	Groundbreaking Soon	2027	The MidTown by Vista Estates, Brgy Canitoan, Cagayan de Oro	
MidTown Tower 3	40 m (130 ft)	12	Groundbreaking Soon	2027	The MidTown by Vista Estates, Brgy Canitoan, Cagayan de Oro	
Primavera City Città Grande Tower E	41 m (135 ft)	12	Under Construction	2026	Pedro N. Roa Senior Ave, Cagayan de Oro	
Primavera City Città Grande Tower F	41 m (135 ft)	12	Under Construction	2026	Pedro N. Roa Senior Ave, Cagayan de Oro	
Tektite: The Alexandrite Columns	38 m (125 ft)	11	Under Construction	2026	Uptown Metropolis, South Diversion Road, Cagayan de Oro	
D’ Residential Loft Tower 2	42 m (138 ft)	12	Under Construction	2028	Pedro N. Roa Senior Ave, Cagayan de Oro	
Platinum Tower	46 m (151 ft)	12	Topped-Off		Rodelsa Cir, Cagayan de Oro	Originally planned as an 18-Storey Riviera hotel to be operated by Genesis Hotel and Resort
SMDC Vail Residences Bldg A	34 m (112 ft)	11	Under Construction	2028	Pedro N. Roa Senior Ave, Cagayan de Oro	
SMDC Vail Residences Bldg N	34 m (112 ft)	11	Under Construction	2028	Pedro N. Roa Senior Ave, Cagayan de Oro	
Uptown Metropolis Office Building 2	39 m (128 ft)	10	Under Construction	2026	Uptown Metropolis, South Diversion Road, Cagayan de Oro	
Unnamed Condo	N/A	10	Groundbreaking Soon	2027	Brgy Upper Camaman-an, Cagayan de Oro	
Greenridge Residences	35 m (115 ft)	10	Proposed	2030	Camiguin St, Barangay Macasandig, Cagayan de Oro	
Greenridge Residences	35 m (115 ft)	10	Proposed	2030	Camiguin St, Barangay Macasandig, Cagayan de Oro	
Greenridge Residences	35 m (115 ft)	10	Proposed	2030	Camiguin St, Barangay Macasandig, Cagayan de Oro	
Greenridge Residences	35 m (115 ft)	10	Proposed	2030	Camiguin St, Barangay Macasandig, Cagayan de Oro	
Benitoite: The Alexandrite Columns	32 m (105 ft)	9	Under Construction	2026	Uptown Metropolis, South Diversion Road, Cagayan de Oro	
Moena Mountain Estate Bldg A	31.5 m (103 ft)	8	Launching Soon	2029	Barangay Dahilayan, Manolo Fortich	A vibrant mixed-use development featuring Dusit Princess Moena
Moena Mountain Estate Bldg B	31 m (102 ft)	8	Launching Soon	2029	Barangay Dahilayan, Manolo Fortich	A vibrant mixed-use development featuring Dusit Princess Moena

== Big Projects ==
Other projects, such as townships and mixed-use developments in the city that contains medium- to high-rise buildings but no information yet.

Name	Land Area	Status	Location	Notes and Sources
Manresa Town	14.6 ha	Ongoing Land Development	Masterson Ave, Cagayan de Oro	
Xavier City	3.9 ha	Proposed	Corrales Ave, Cagayan de Oro	The development will start upon the completion of the XU Masterson Campus
Pontefino Estates	23 ha	Under Construction	Masterson Ave, Cagayan de Oro	
The Upper Central	117 ha	Groundbreaking Soon	J.R. Borja Ext, Brgy Gusa, Cagayan de Oro	
Orchard District	44 ha	Groundbreaking Soon	South Diversion Road, Cagayan de Oro	
The MidTown by Vista Estates	22 ha	Ongoing Land Development	Brgy Canitoan, Cagayan de Oro	
The Montage by Vista Estates	50 ha	Ongoing Land Development	Brgy Lumbia, Cagayan de Oro	
Habini Bay	526 ha	Ongoing Land Development	Laguindingan, Misamis Oriental	
Limketkai Reclamation	500 ha	Proposed	Brgy Bulua, Cagayan de Oro	
Priland Mixed-use Complex	3 ha	Proposed	Brgy Carmen, Cagayan de Oro	
Priland Township	50 ha	Proposed	Brgy Carmen, Cagayan de Oro	
The New City	60 ha	Ongoing Land Development	Brgy Lumbia, Cagayan de Oro	60 towers with 10-12 floors, 25 towers with 5 floors
Paraiso Hill	39 ha	Launching Soon	Brgy Indahag, Cagayan de Oro	
Southridge	31 ha	Groundbreaking Soon	Uptown, Cagayan de Oro	
Paseo del Rio Complex	12.3 ha	Ongoing Land Development	Rodelsa Cir, Cagayan de Oro	
Radisson Blu Hotel and Residences Cagayan de Oro	TBA	Launching Soon	Uptown, Cagayan de Oro	

== See also ==
- List of tallest buildings in Asia
- List of tallest buildings in the Philippines
- List of tallest buildings in Davao City
