= List of real estate companies of the Philippines =

This is a list of notable real estate companies of the Philippines.

- Ayala Land
- Cebu Landmasters
- Century Properties
- DMCI Homes
- DoubleDragon Properties
- Filinvest Land, Inc.
- Italpinas Development Corporation
- Megaworld Corporation
- MRC Allied
- Property Company of Friends
- SM Prime Holdings
- Sta. Lucia Land Inc.
- Vista Land
