= Property Company of Friends =

Real estate developer in the Philippines

Property Company of Friends Inc.
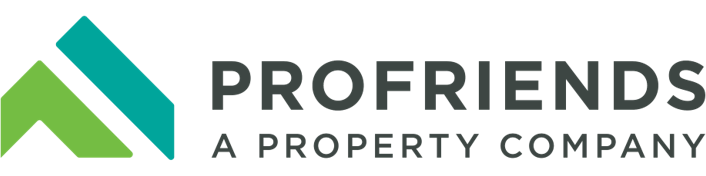
- Company type: Private
- Founded: Mandaluyong, Philippines in 1999
- Founder: Guillermo Choa
- Headquarters: Pro-Friends Center, 55 Tinio St., Mandaluyong, Philippines
- Key people: Guillermo C. Choa, Chairman; Jocelyn Guzman, President and CEO
- Revenue: PHP 5.36 billion (approx US$119.11 million USD) (2014)
- Net income: PHP 1.9 billion (approx US$42.2 million USD) (2014)
- Parent: Profriends Group, Inc. (100%)
- Website: www.profriends.com

Property Company of Friends, Inc., commonly known as Pro-Friends is a real estate company in the Philippines owned by Guillermo Choa. It is engaged in low-cost housing and condominium development. Its projects are on Luzon, Visayas and Mindanao. Its banner project is Lancaster New City, which occupies three towns in Cavite from Kawit, Imus, and General Trias. It has applied for its IPO under its holding entity, Amicus Holdings, which in turn has its subsidiary, Williamton, to handle in-house financing at second quarter of 2014 but was abandoned since March 2015.

== History ==
Property Company of Friends, Inc. was established in 1999. Constructing homes with precast concrete technology.

== Projects ==
- Avignon Place – Imus, Cavite
- Bellefort Estates – Bacoor, Cavite
- California West Hills – Imus
- Carmona Estates – Carmona, Cavite, Biñan, Laguna
- Cedar Residences – Carmona, Cavite
- Chateau Real – General Trias, Cavite
- Chesapeake Village – Imus, Cavite
- Garden Grove Village – Dasmariñas, Cavite
- Greensborough Subdivision – Dasmariñas, Cavite
- Gold Crest Villas – Trece Martires, Cavite
- Ilustrata Residences – Quezon City, Metro Manila
- Jardin de Madrid Villas – Bacoor, Cavite
- Lancaster New City – General Trias, Imus, Kawit, Cavite
- Las Verandas Villas II – Imus, Cavite
- Mahogany Mansion – Mandaluyong, Metro Manila
- Montefaro Village – Imus, Cavite
- Montecillo Villas – Pavia, Iloilo
- North East Primarosa – Imus, Cavite
- One Primerose Place – Mandaluyong, Metro Manila
- Palm Grove Village – Imus, Cavite
- Palms Lakeshore – Mexico, Pampanga
- Parc Regency Residences – Pavia, Iloilo
- Parc Regency Greens – Pavia, Iloilo
- Parklane Country Homes – General Trias, Cavite
- Primarosa Village – Imus, Cavite
- Primavera Villas – Cabanatuan, Nueva Ecija
- Ridge Crest – Bacoor, Cavite
- Rosewood Village – Bacoor, Cavite
- Solare Estates – Cagayan de Oro, Misamis Oriental
- Silver Crest – Bacoor, Cavite
- St. Joseph the Worker Village – General Trias, Cavite
- University Executive Villas – Dasmariñas, Cavite
- Villa de Alyssa – Imus, Cavite
- Villa de Primarosa – Imus, Cavite
- Ville de Palme – General Trias, Cavite
- Ville de Soleil – Dasmariñas, Cavite
- Windsor Mansions – Imus, Cavite

== Subsidiaries ==
- Profriends Group, Inc. (formerly Amicus Holdings, Inc)
- Firm Builders Realty Development Corporation
- Micara Land, Inc.
- Williamton Holdings, Inc.

== Road to Public Offering and Acquisition ==
In August 2014, Pro-Friends announced that they are eyeing an initial public offering by September or October of the same year. However, there was no IPO that happened along the mentioned months and a press release was made December of the same year that the Securities and Exchange Commission has approved its IPO set on January 14, 2015 citing that the reason for the delay is due to negative leads brought about by a competitor prompting SEC to require Pro-Friends to clarify the allegations before the IPO application is processed. However, the reason for the delay was refuted by the Chief Operating Officer of PSE, Roel Refran.

On January 9, 2015, SEC has approved a PHP 7.7 billion (approx US$175 million USD) IPO and the listing date was set January 14, 2015. Eventually, the IPO offering expired as the Philippine Stock Exchange has not given a go-signal for ProFriends due to outstanding issues and non-compliance with the standard requirements. The company has abandoned the offering since March 2015. In August 2015, Pro-Friends has abandoned its IPO when George Ty's GT Capital Holdings acquired 22.68 percent of its stake.

On the second quarter of 2016, an additional 28.30% of Property Company of Friends Inc. was also acquired by GT Capital Holdings, Inc.. The deal increases GT Capital's economic stake in Pro-Friends from 22.70 percent to 51.0 percent.

== Marketing ==
Property Company of Friends is highly active on their marketing activities, being a sponsor for the location on the reality TV show I Do, existence of sponsored articles on various online and paper publications, advertisements on radio stations, and hired Janette Toral, to set up its SEO Lead Generation Program (July 2014 to December 2014).

The company's aggressive marketing has been criticized by some real-estate analysts as creating a breeding culture of "The customer is not always right."; which was brought about by their focus on creative marketing even though its core business is building houses.

== Controversies ==
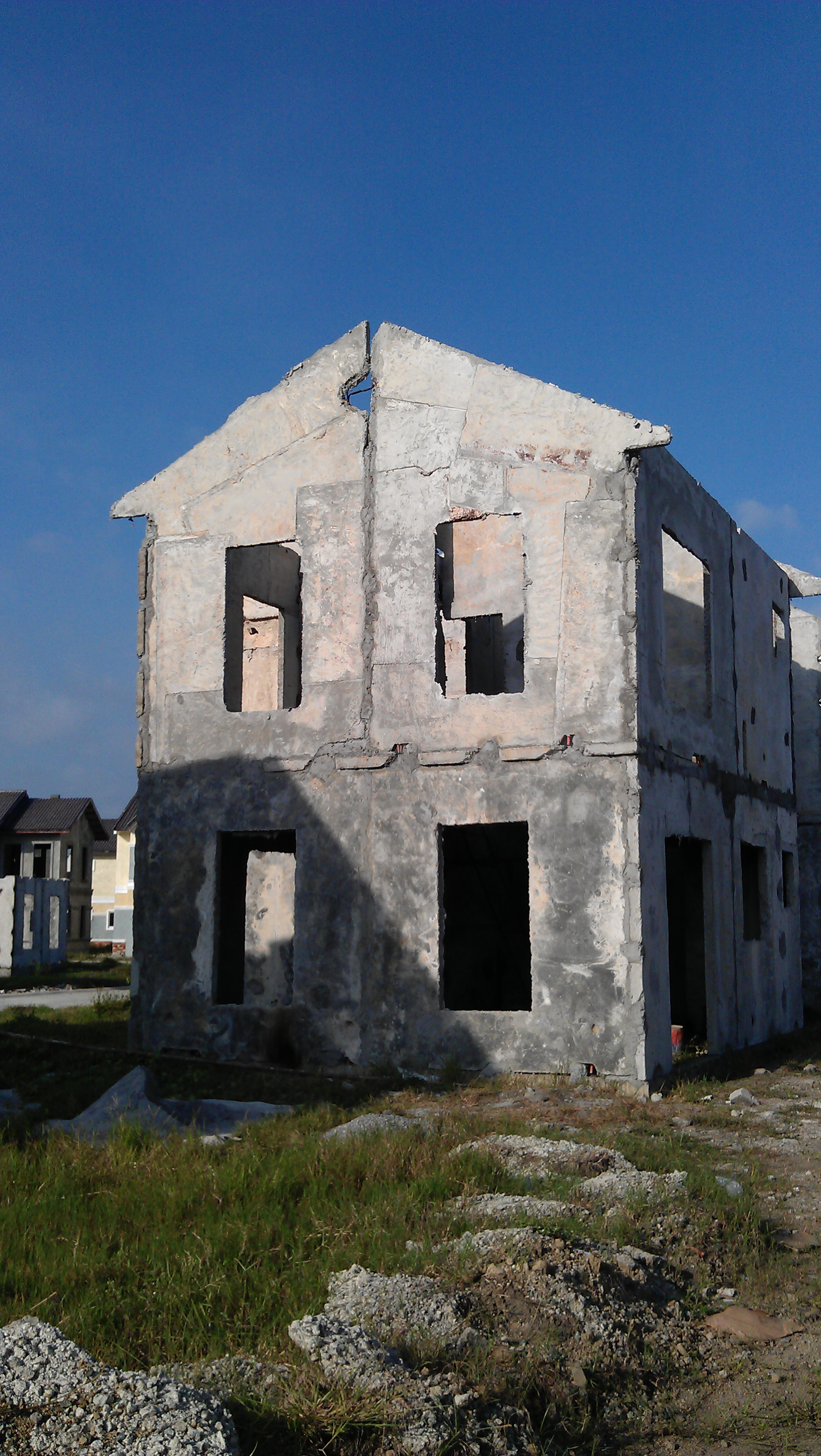
A sample of Gabrielle unit construction at Manchester 1 Village, Lancaster New City, Barangay Navarro, General Trias, Cavite showing cracked pre-cast panels and the absence of vertical posts and horizontal beams.

The company has been marred by controversies such as false advertising, delayed turn-overs, illegal control of homeowners associations within their projects, quality and structural integrity issues, hazardous location based on Good Building Design and Construction in the Philippines by UNISDR, no inspection policy during construction, and lawsuits.

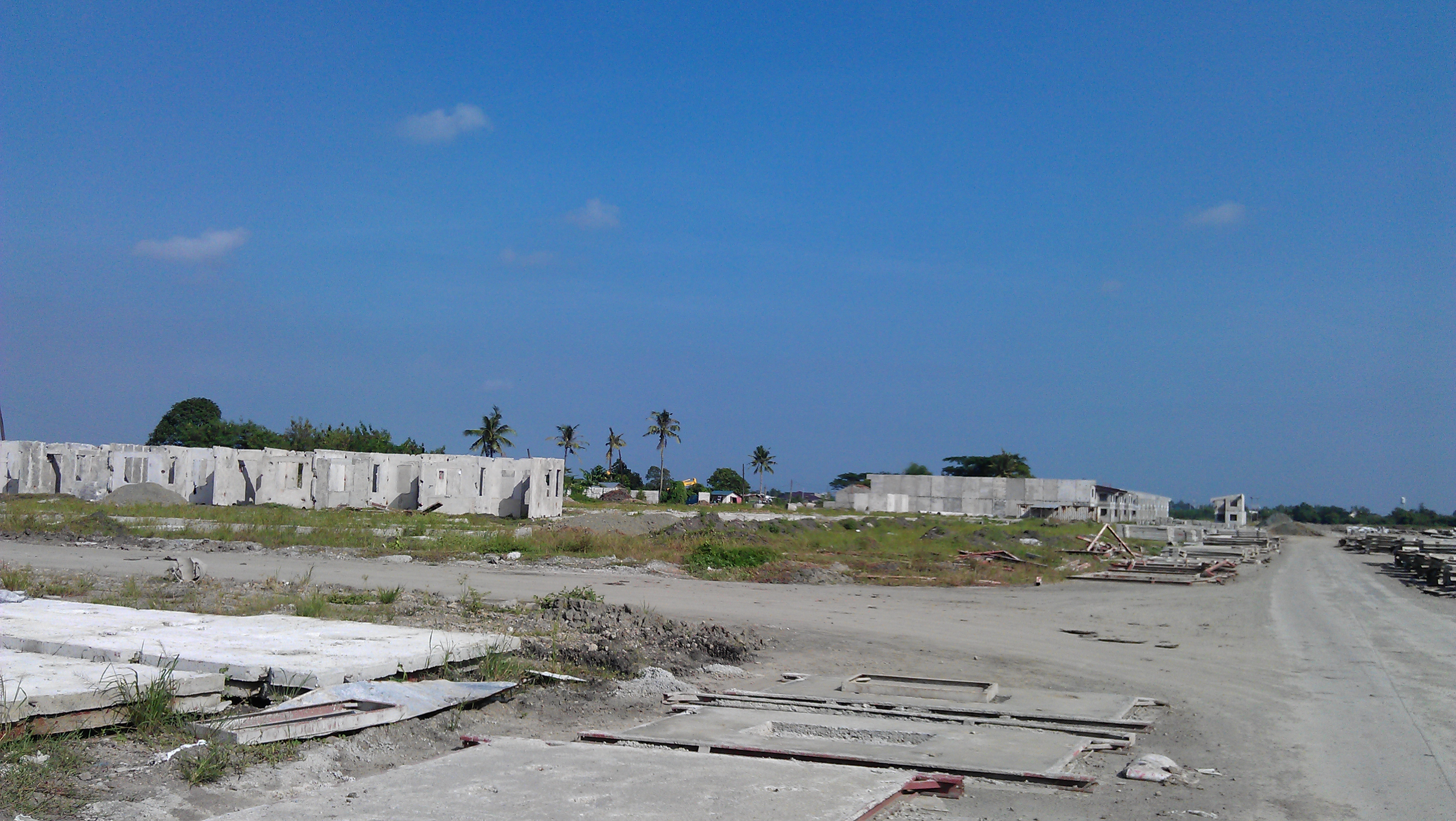
A sample of Alice units construction at Kensington 4 Village, Lancaster New City, Barangay Navarro, General Trias, Cavite showing pre-cast panels molded and dried along the streets in an uncontrolled environment.

=== Senate Resolutions Concerning Allegations of Laws Violated by Pro-Friends ===
On August 20, 2014, concerned citizens have pushed Philippine Senator and head of the Senate Commission on Urban Planning, Housing and Resettlement, JV Ejercito, to conduct an inquiry in aid of legislation regarding the alleged violations of Pro-Friends on several housing laws such as Republic Act 6541 of the National Building Code of the Philippines and the alleged passive treatment of the housing regulation entity of the Philippines, the Housing and Land Use Regulatory Board (HLURB). Senate Resolution No. 859 Series of 2014 has been released by the 16th Congress. On December 9, 2014, a new Senate Resolution 1054 has been released from the office of the same senator to upgrade Resolution 859 by including alleged violations of real-estate developers on the independence of homeowners associations from control of real estate developers as mentioned in Republic Act 9904 implementation.

=== Protests, Exposé and Lawsuits ===
In October 2015, due to allegations of violations, a surge of online protests and weblogs about the quality of construction and unsuited location of projects of the real-estate developer has prompted the company to file libel complaints to its complaining customers and individuals, including Ervin Malicdem, a hazards mapper. The complaint however was dismissed by the Mandaluyong Prosecutor's Office as the information exposed was "made in good faith and there is truth to the claim, while Pro-Friends was not able to controvert the allegations against them."

In March 2016, Congressman Karlo Nograles has urged the Housing and Urban Development Coordinating Council to cease the operations of Pro-Friends due to increasing number of complaints, including the presence of improper drainage that causes severe flooding, defective sewerage system and substandard materials were used for construction. HUDCC on the other hand, under the chairmanship of Vice President Leni Robredo, posted an advisory regarding the complaints hurled against the real-estate developer, prompting confirmation of 415 cases filed in HLURB that resulted in favor of the buyers.

=== The company's response ===
According to Property Company of Friends, turn-over delays are present as they continue to improve the efficiency of their processes while they are placing the safety of their customers as the priority. This paved way for the reason why prohibition of buyer inspections during construction phase are in effect. Additionally, flooding is brought about by the abnormal rainfall that inundated Cavite during Typhoon Maring of 2013 that reached 475 mm. However, petitioners have remained unsatisfied with the response as their policies are allegedly in violation of some tenets in the Consumer Act of the Philippines and Presidential Decree 957.As for the flooding caused by TS Maring, it only dropped 335 mm over a 24-hour period at Cavite City; which is twelve kilometers away from Lancaster New City. Residents of one their Cavite project believe the flooding was only caused partly by the amount of rainfall.

== See also ==
- List of real estate companies of the Philippines
- Commons:Property Company of Friends projects Gallery
