= Davao Global Township =

Central business district in Davao City

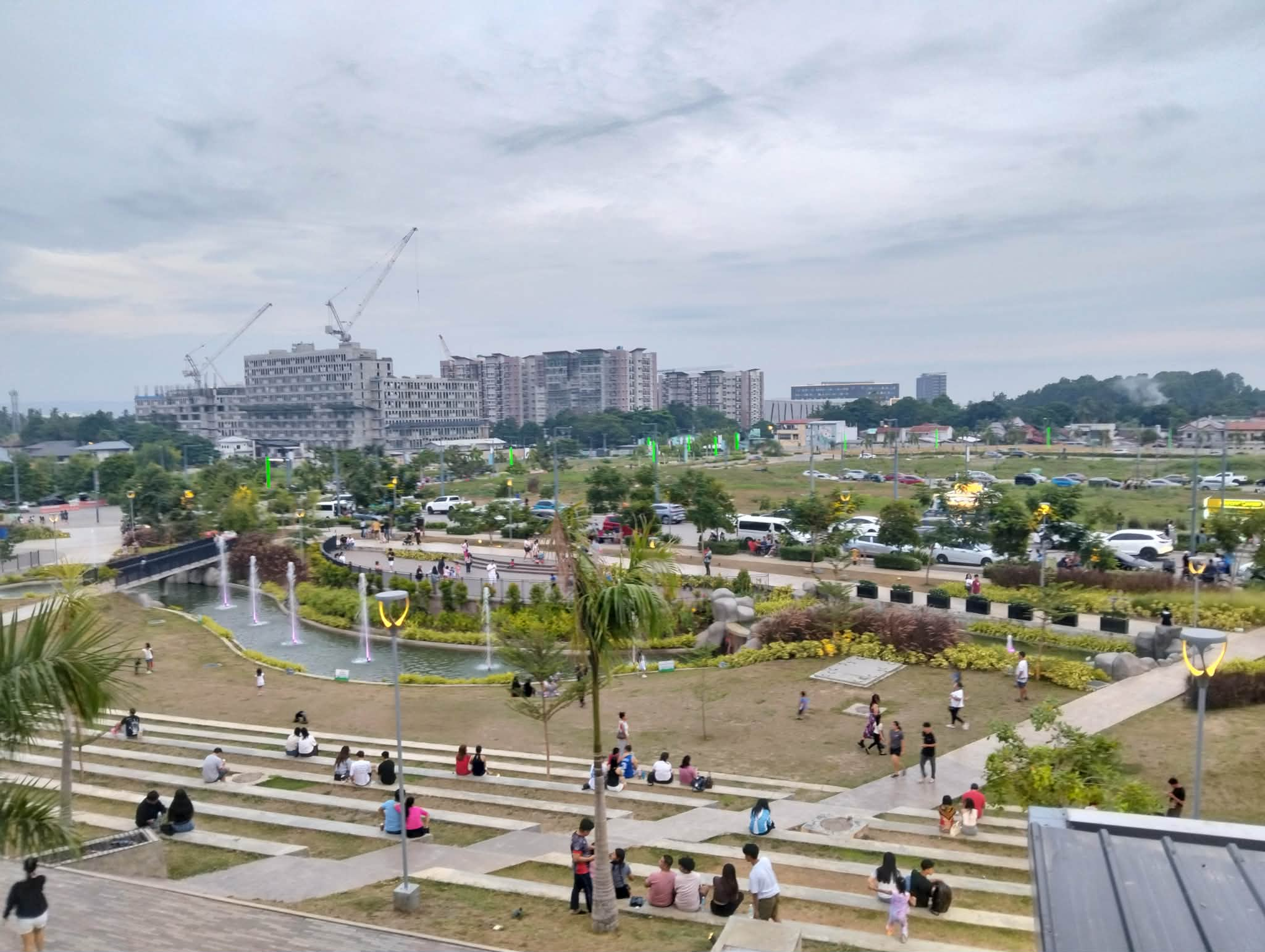
- Central Business District
- Interactive map of Davao Global Township
- Country: Philippines
- Region: Davao Region
- Province: Davao del Sur
- City: Davao City
- Opening date: May 25, 2023
- Founder: A joint venture between Cebu Landmasters Inc and YHEST Realty And Development Corporation

Area
  - Total: 0.23 km^{2} (0.089 sq mi)
- Time zone: UTC+8 (PST)
- Website: Official website

Davao Global Township (DGT) is a 23-hectare, under-construction master-planned development and central business district located in Matina, Davao City, Philippines. Cebu Landmasters, a Cebu-based real-estate developer, is the company currently responsible for the development of the business district, and is the first township ever developed by Cebu Landmasters in partnership with Davao's Villa-Abrille clan.

== History ==
Prior its construction, Davao Global Township was the site of the former Matina Golf Club. The 18-hectare golf course was bought by the Francisco Villa-Abrille in 1912, and the golf course opened in 1950. In 2018, Cebu Landmasters broke ground of the 23-hectare business district. The project for the township was divided into several phases, on which the first phase will include an office tower, two residential towers, retail buildings, a Cineplex mall, and a convention center covering a 93,000-square meter area. Cebu Landmasters planned to pour in ₱10 billion for the project.

== Developments ==
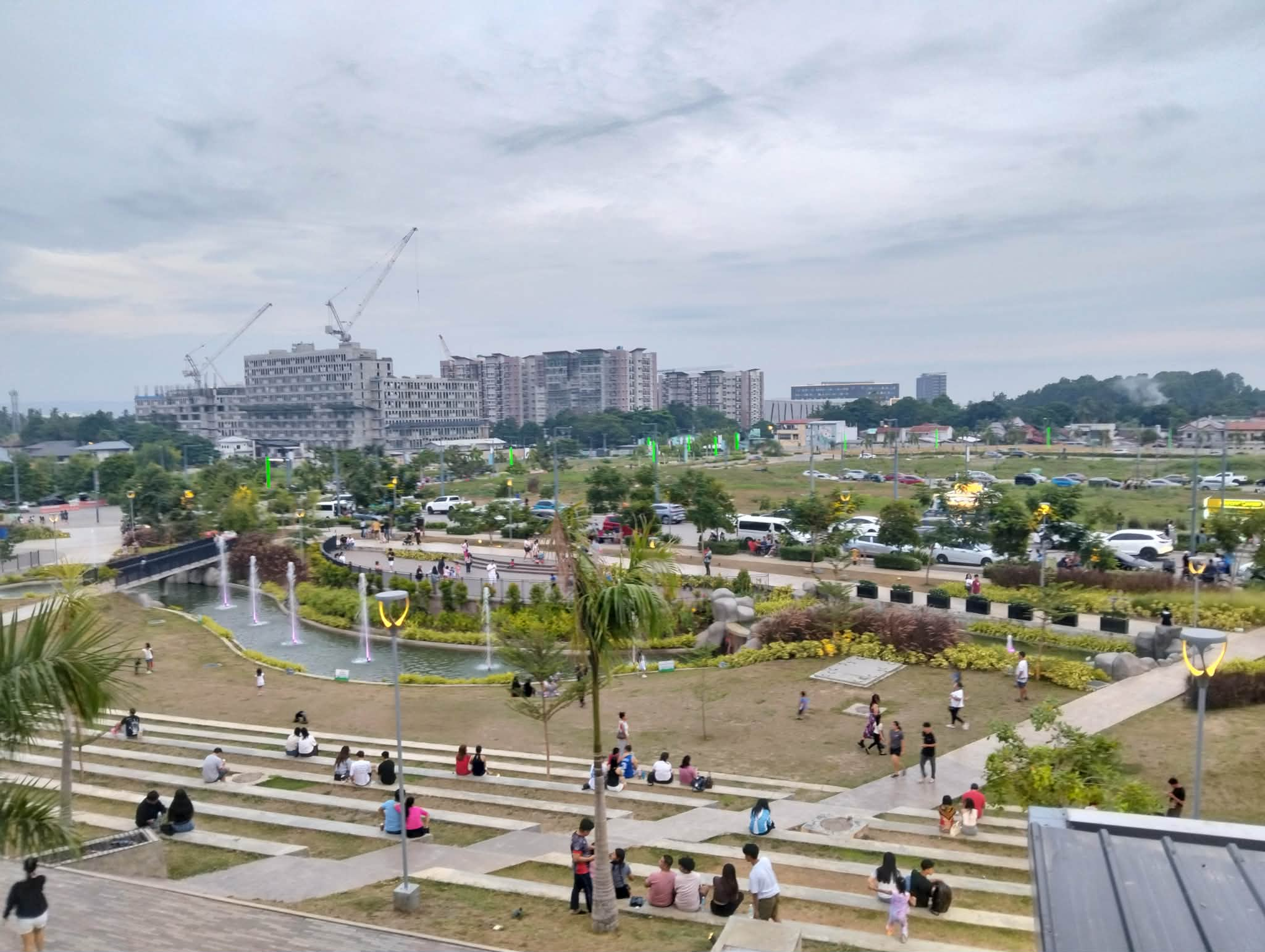
The view of Davao Global Township as of 2026.

=== Businesses ===
Davao Global Township will soon house several businesses upon its completion. In 2024, Philippine-based life insurance company Insular Life acquired a lot in the 23-hectare township, in its proposal of constructing its largest office in the island region of Mindanao.

=== Residential ===
The 23-hectare township will soon host residential areas. The East Village is the first residential development in the Davao Global Township, hosting over 2,000 residential units across its 6-tower residential area. The residential development is currently under construction and is scheduled to be completed by the third quarter of 2026.

=== DGT City Center ===
DGT City center is a premier global lifestyle center in the center of the township designed by CASAS + Architects, Inc. It is poised to be a landmark destination, set to bring a world-class shopping experience among citizens of Davao city. The architecture of the mall is inspired from the sails of a traditional Mindanaoan Vinta and encompasses of pillars that are designed like mangrove branches that supported the canopies.

The shopping mall includes retail outlets, dining areas, open-air spaces, and indoor gardens.

== Education ==
DGT will also soon host major institutions. De La Salle University (DLSU) will be among the prominent universities in the township, and a proposed university campus is being constructed, along with a cultural and social center, and office buildings.

== Gallery ==
The 800th Mcdonalds in the Philippines, DGT Mcdonalds.

DGT pavilion at night.

The central park at night.

== See also ==
List of tallest buildings in Davao City
