= Primavera Residences =

Coordinates: 8°27′15.7″N 124°37′23.7″E

- Interactive map of the Primavera Residences area

General information
- Type: Mixed-used Condominium
- Location: 1125 Trade Street, Pueblo de Oro, Upper Carmen, Cagayan de Oro, Philippines
- Construction started: 2010
- Completed: 2015
- Owner: Italpinas Development Corporation

Technical details
- Floor count: 11 floors

Primavera Residences is a twin-tower, 10-story mixed-use development in Pueblo de Oro Business Park, Cagayan de Oro in the province of Northern Mindanao, Philippines. It contains residential, commercial, and office units designed and developed by Italpinas Development Corporation (IDC), a firm specializing in green architecture.

It is an eco-friendly, Italian-inspired property constructed along the principles of sustainable architecture. In accordance with these principles, the property generates its own energy, minimizes power usage, and maximizes natural light and ventilation. The first tower was completed in 2012, while the second tower was completed in 2014. In 2015. Primavera Residences was given the EDGE certification awarded by International Finance Corporation as the first completed condominium project in East Asia and the second development in the Philippines.

== Architecture and design ==
Primavera Residences is a 10-storey twin-tower condominium complex, which is the first green building in Cagayan de Oro. It is also the first project of IDC in the city. IDC Chairman and Chief Executive Officer Romolo Valentino Nati, who is also a sustaining member of the Philippine Green Building Council, designed the twin towers himself.

The first tower of the condominium complex has a total of 162 residential and commercial units, while the second tower has 166. The shape, volume, and profiles of each tower were specifically chosen by Arch. Nati so that air will enter the lower levels of the tower and then travel upward through the courtyard, thereby creating a funnel effect that ensures the even distribution of air to all condominium units.

The design was inspired by the traditional Bahay Kubo—a stilt house made of organic materials like bamboo, coconut leaves, and grass—which Arch. Nati sees as the quintessential sustainable house. IDC has incorporated the green architecture of the Bahay Kubo concept in all of its projects. The Primavera Residences project was named Best Condo Development in the Philippines during the Southeast Asia Property Award (SEAPA) in 2011 and Best Mixed-Use Development in the 2014 Asia Pacific Property Awards.

=== Biomimicry ===
Biomimicry studies the models, designs, elements, systems, and processes of nature and then imitates these to provide solutions to human problems. Although the concept has been around for years, it is only now being introduced in the Philippines by IDC.

IDC realized that in the past, human development didn't pose much of a problem where the environment is concerned. Our consumption of natural resources was in balance with nature's requirements for the replenishment of those resources. They are also well aware that today, that balance has been broken by the collective misconception that natural resources are ours for the taking and that they will never run out.

The IDC team knows that the Philippine cities of today were built with the wrong mindset and this mindset has to be changed first if the Philippines ever hopes to change their cities for the better. The concept of biomimicry also dictates that property developers in any city should avoid copying property models from around the world because what may be ideal for one place isn't necessarily ideal for another.

For Primavera Residences, IDC figured that the anthill model is the best one to mimic; hence, the central column in each building. This column is patterned after the hollow opening of an ant colony, which is used primarily for ventilation and for the transportation of materials. The column also lets natural light into the building, thereby reducing the need for artificial lighting.

Arch. Nati says the IDC design process is primarily based on performance. They rely on the idea that the things that perform well are the things that are most likely to proliferate and remain in existence for the long term. And for projects like Primavera Residences, the main green features are the buildings themselves. Another benefit of the design are the savings on construction costs, which allow the developer to offer the condominium units at very affordable prices. The savings on electricity also means lower association dues.

Other IDC projects that adopt biomimicry in their design are the Coral City (inspired by corals) in Quezon City and Miramonti (inspired by sponges) in Sto. Tomas, Batangas.

== Green features ==
The structure of Primavera Residences is able to withstand strong earthquakes and other kinds of major natural calamities. Its green features include:

- The biomimicry-inspired building orientation, which creates a funnel effect that results in even distribution of air across all units
- Brise soleil shelters on its façade that provide shade and protect the windows during the hottest part of the day and reducing internal temperature in the condo units
- Photovoltaic solar panels on the rooftop to produce its own energy
- Extended awnings to maximize light and shadow
- Green inner courtyard that acts as natural chimney, allowing cool breeze to flow naturally into the building
- Unit cross-ventilation for indoor heat reduction
- Natural light coming into the condo units through the inner courtyard

Residents of the building save as much as 32% on energy consumption—specifically air conditioning use—because of Primavera Residences’ natural ventilation and heat reduction features. It is also expected that Primavera's photovoltaic cells will start feeding the city's local distribution utility grid once the Net Metering Law is implemented. This will bring the condominium's electric bill down even more, thereby further reducing the residents’ respective electric bill

== Amenities ==
Primavera Residences is equipped with modern amenities such as an indoor saltwater swimming pool with Jacuzzi, a multipurpose hall, a gym, 24/7 security inclusive of a TV security system, shops and restaurants on the ground floor, and an inner courtyard. These amenities have recently been named among the country's most promising clean energy investment opportunities during the Climate Technology Initiative-Private Financing Advisory Network (CTI-PFAN) Philippines Clean Energy Investor Forum.

=== Awards ===
IDC has received several awards for their Primavera project. Among these awards are the following:

- Philippine Green Building Council-Leadership in Green Building Award 2016 (Philippines, 2016)
- EDGE ( Excellence in Design for Greater Efficiencies) awarded by IFC World Bank (Philippines, 2015)
- International Property Award for Best Mixed-use Development in the Philippines (Kuala Lumpur, 2014)
- CTI-PFAN Asia Forum for Clean Energy Financing Business Plan Competition Top 10 (Singapore, 2013)
- Southeast Asia Property Awards—Highly Commended for Best Condo Development in the Philippines (Singapore, 2011)
- CTI-PFAN for one of the Most Promising Clean Energy Investment Opportunities in the Philippines (Manila, 2010)

== Green Initiative ==
Primavera Residences is part of Pueblo de Oro Township's “Green Initiative", as it complements the other environment-friendly projects in the area, which includes the 40-hectare Pueblo Urban Rainforest as well as the electric shuttles that serve Pueblo residents. And Primavera's involvement in the Green Initiative isn't limited to the sustainable design of the condominium complex; Primavera staff also joins other stakeholders in planting endemic tree species (wildlings) in the Urban Rainforest. The goal is to eventually plant a total of 30,000 wildlings in the forest.
