= List of tallest buildings in Davao City =

Aeon towers

Metro Davao, one of the three metropolitan areas in the Philippines, is home to numerous high-rise buildings. Most of these are located in Davao City, which has seen a lot of high-rises sprout throughout the years. Surrounding cities, however, which are also part of Metro Davao, such as Tagum, Panabo, and Digos contain very little high-rise buildings. One of the factors affecting the number of high-rises in those areas would be Davao City's land area, which is nearly four times the size of Metro Manila. Within Davao City, most high-rises are concentrated within Poblacion district, however, the neighboring districts of Bajada, Agdao, Buhangin, and Talomo are now home to some of the city's tallest buildings. Currently, the tallest building in Davao City and Mindanao is Vivaldi Residences Davao.

== Building height regulation ==
Because the city's airport is located near the city center, the Civil Aviation Authority of the Philippines imposes a height limit along the airport's flight path, which includes a large part of the city center. According to Comprehensive Land Use Plan (CLUP) Volume 2 Zoning Ordinance 2019-2028 the maximum premium building height for buildings along the flight path is 135 meters above mean sea level (AMSL). The city government states other reasons for the building height regulation policy, such as preserving the view of cultural sites, improve urban livability through cleaner air, access to sunlight, and the like, and incentivize the private sector to improve on what has already been built.

== Tallest Landmark Structure Limitation ==
The city government may allow for one building surpassing the premium height limitation to serve as the city's tallest "landmark building" having the overall elevation of its top floor of 140 meters (460 feet) above mean sea level, of course, it must meet the criteria that the building's design is unique and should bear semblance to or representation of Davao City's culture and heritage. It must also devote at least half of its ground floor area to the public and make the summit accessible to the public for viewing and tourism purposes either with or without a fee. Finally, the usable floor spaces must be at least 70% non-residential development.

== Tallest completed buildings ==
This list ranks the tallest completed buildings in Davao City which have at least 12 floors above ground or stand at least 49 meters (161 ft) tall.

Rank	Name	Image	Height	Storey	Year of Completion	District	Sources	Notes
1	Vivaldi Residences Davao		121 m (397 ft)	36	2023	Poblacion		Standing at 397 feet, it remains the tallest man-made structure in Davao City and across the entire Mindanao since its topping-off in 2019.
2	Aeon Towers	Captured on top of abreeza mall.	108 m (354 ft)	32	2021	Poblacion		It held the title of the tallest building in Davao City from 2017 to 2019.
3	One Paragon Place		107 m (351 ft)	28	Topped Off	Talomo		The tallest in Talomo District, the residential tower of The Paragon Davao mixed-use development, rising above a lifestyle mall.
4	Avida Towers Davao Tower 2		105 m (344 ft)	29	2017	Poblacion		
5	202 Peaklane East Tower		101 m (331 ft)	28	Topped Off	Poblacion		
5	202 Peaklane West Tower		101 m (331 ft)	28	Topped Off	Poblacion		
6	Patio Suites Tower 1		100 m (330 ft)	28	2024	Poblacion		
6	Patio Suites Tower 2		100 m (330 ft)	28	Topped Off	Poblacion		
6	Abreeza Place 1		100 m (330 ft)	28	2016	Poblacion		
6	Abreeza Place 2		100 m (330 ft)	28	2018	Poblacion		
7	Avida Towers Abreeza Tower 1		96 m (315 ft)	26	2024	Poblacion		
7	Avida Towers Abreeza Tower 2		96 m (315 ft)	26	Topped Off	Poblacion		
8	Abreeza Residences		90 m (300 ft)	25	2015	Poblacion		
8	Verdon Parc - Maurin Tower		90 m (300 ft)	24	2022	Talomo		
8	Verdon Parc - Trevans Tower		90 m (300 ft)	24	2021	Talomo		
8	Verdon Parc - Belvedere Tower		90 m (300 ft)	24	2020	Talomo		
9	Avida Towers Davao Tower 1		88 m (289 ft)	24	2016	Poblacion		
10	Citadines Paragon Davao		86 m (282 ft)	19	Topped Off	Talomo		
11	SotoGrande Hotel Davao		81 m (266 ft)	20	2019	Talomo		
12	Mesatierra Garden Residences		76 m (249 ft)	22	2022	Poblacion		
13	Marco Polo Davao Hotel		74 m (243 ft)	18	1998	Poblacion		Currently under refurbishment
14	The Residences At Azuela Cove - South Tower		73 m (240 ft)	22	2024	Buhangin		
15	Inspiria Tower		71 m (233 ft)	21	2020	Poblacion		
15	The Residences At Azuela Cove - North Tower		71 m (233 ft)	21	2024	Buhangin		
16	Lanang Premier Doctor's Hospital		69 m (226 ft)	14	2021	Buhangin		
17	One Lakeshore Drive Tower 1		67 m (220 ft)	21	2025	Buhangin		
17	One Lakeshore Drive Tower 2		67 m (220 ft)	21	2025	Buhangin		
17	One Lakeshore Drive Tower 3		67 m (220 ft)	21	2026	Buhangin		
17	One Lakeshore Drive Tower 4		67 m (220 ft)	21	Topped Off	Buhangin		
17	Ivory Residences		67 m (220 ft)	19	2024	Poblacion		
18	Davao Finance Center		64 m (210 ft)	15	2017	Buhangin		
18	LANDCO-PCDP Corporate Center		64 m (210 ft)	16	1995	Poblacion		
18	Felcris Centrale		64 m (210 ft)	15	2015	Poblacion		
19	Damosa Diamond Tower		60 m (200 ft)	16	2021	Buhangin		
19	Camella Northpoint - Liverpool		60 m (200 ft)	16	2016	Poblacion		
20	The Zenith Tower		59 m (194 ft)	14	2025	Poblacion		
21	Legacy Leisure Residences Tower 2		58.5 m (192 ft)	15	Topped Off	Talomo		
22	DMSF Hospital Building Expansion		55.5 m (182 ft)	12	Completed	Poblacion		
22	Trinity Building - San Pedro College		55.5 m (182 ft)	15	2020	Poblacion		
23	The Pinnacle Hotel and Suites		54 m (177 ft)	12	2010	Poblacion		Spire highest point (According to Google Earth)
24	Pryce Tower		53 m (174 ft)	14	1995	Poblacion		
25	Ateneo de Davao - Community Tower		51 m (167 ft)	15	2014	Poblacion		
25	Royal Mandaya Hotel East Building		51 m (167 ft)	10	1998	Poblacion		Pinnacle height (According to Google Earth)
25	Grand Regal Hotel		51 m (167 ft)	12	1998	Buhangin		
26	Casa Mira Towers LPU South Tower		51 m (167 ft)	14	Topped Off	Buhangin		
26	Casa Mira Towers LPU North Tower		51 m (167 ft)	15	Topped Off	Buhangin		
27	Durian Hotel		49 m (161 ft)	12	1994	Poblacion		Currently under renovation (On-hold)
27	DMSF Tower		49 m (161 ft)	12	2015	Poblacion		

== Tallest buildings under construction ==
Only buildings with at least 12 floors are included in this list.

Rank	Name	Height	Storey	Status	Completion Yr (Est.)	Sources
	Matina Enclaves Tower 3	100 m (330 ft)	27	Under Construction	2028	
	Mindara Residences South Tower	45 m (148 ft)	12	Under Construction	2029	
	Mindara Residences North Tower	45 m (148 ft)	12	Under Construction	2029	
	Aeon Bleu Residences Tower 1	90 m (300 ft)	24	Topped Off	2026	
	Aeon Bleu Residences Tower 2	90 m (300 ft)	24	Topped Off	2026	
	Aeon Bleu Aria Studios Davao	87 m (285 ft)	23	Topped Off	2026	
	Aeon Bleu Residential Office Tower 4	N/A	18	Under Construction	2029	
	Aeon Bleu Premier Tower 6	N/A	21	Under Construction	2029	
	Matina Enclaves Residences D	45 m (148 ft)	12	Completed	2024	
	Matina Enclaves Residences E	45 m (148 ft)	12	Completed	2026	
	Two Lakeshore Drive Tower 1	67 m (220 ft)	21	Under Construction	2028	
	Two Lakeshore Drive Tower 2	67 m (220 ft)	21	Under Construction	2028	
	Two Lakeshore Drive Tower 3	67 m (220 ft)	21	Under Construction	2029	
	Two Lakeshore Drive Tower 4	67 m (220 ft)	21	Under Construction	2029	
	Legacy Leisure Residences Tower 3	58.5 m (192 ft)	15	Topped Off	2027	
	Lane Residences - Building A	48 m (157 ft)	13	Topped Off	2026?	
	Lane Residences - Building B	48 m (157 ft)	13	Topped Off	2026?	
	Lane Residences - Building C	48 m (157 ft)	13	Topped Off	2026?	
	Hotel 101 Davao	~ 48 m (157 ft)	12	Completed	2026	
	The East Village Tower 1	44 m (144 ft)	12	Topped Off	2027	
	The East Village Tower 2	48 m (157 ft)	14	Under Construction	2027	
	The East Village Tower 3	48 m (157 ft)	14	Topped Off	2027	
	The East Village Tower 4	51 m (167 ft)	15	Under Construction	2027	
	The East Village Tower 5	59 m (194 ft)	17	Under Construction	2029	
	The East Village Tower 6	62 m (203 ft)	18	Under Construction	2029	
	Amani Grand Citygate - Yellow Building	44 m (144 ft)	12	Completed	2024	
	Amani Grand Citygate - Red Building	44 m (144 ft)	12	Topped Off	2026	
	Amani Grand Citygate - White Building	44 m (144 ft)	12	Topped Off	2026	
	Bed N’ Business Hotel	47 m (154 ft)	12	Topped Off	2026	
	One Republic Plaza	72 m (236 ft)	16	On-hold	2028	
	8 Spatial Building 7	44 m (144 ft)	12	Topped Off	2026	
	The Piazza Building A	40 m (130 ft)	13	Under Construction	2029	
	Destine Davao Tower 1	76 m (249 ft)	22	Under Construction	2029	
	Crown Residences At Tierra Davao	74 m (243 ft)	21	Under Construction	2029	
	Crest Suites At Tierra Davao	74 m (243 ft)	21	Under Construction	2029	
	SM Lanang BPO Towers 1	N/A	15	Under Construction	2028	
	SM Lanang BPO Towers 2	N/A	15	Under Construction	2028	
	Downtowne Premier Residences Tower 1	N/A	28	Under Construction	2030	
	Downtowne Premier Residences Tower 2	N/A	28	Under Construction	2030	
	The West Village at DGT Tower 1	N/A	17	Under Construction	2030	
	The West Village at DGT Tower 2	N/A	17	Under Construction	2030	

== Tallest proposed buildings ==
Buildings which have not yet started construction work and contains at least 12 floors are included in this list.

Rank	Name	Height	Storey	Sources	Notes
	Fairfield by Marriott Davao	N/A	N/A		
	Four Points by Sheraton Davao Hotel & Convention Center	N/A	N/A		
	Lane Residences - Building D	N/A	N/A		
	Lane Residences - Building E	N/A	N/A		
	Lane Residences - Building F	N/A	N/A		
	Lane Residences - Building G	N/A	N/A		
	Lane Residences - Building H	N/A	N/A		
	8 Spatial Building 6	44 m (144 ft)	12		
	Centro Spatial Davao Building D	~ 57 m (187 ft)	17		
	Centro Spatial Davao Building E	~ 57 m (187 ft)	17		
	The Parkshore Azuela Cove Tower 1	N/A	17		
	The Parkshore Azuela Cove Tower 2	N/A	18		
	Cala Davao Tower 1	N/A	16		
	Cala Davao Tower 2	N/A	16		
	The West Village at DGT Tower 3	N/A	17		
	The West Village at DGT Tower 4	N/A	17		
	The West Village at DGT Tower 5	N/A	17		
	Avida Towers Abreeza Tower 3	96 m (315 ft)	26		
	Legacy Leisure Residences Tower 1	58.5 m (192 ft)	15		
	Legacy Leisure Residences Tower 4	58.5 m (192 ft)	15		
	DGT Corporate Towers	N/A	N/A		
	Avalon Heights Towers	N/A	N/A		
	Belleza Towers - East Tower	139 m (456 ft)	37		
	Belleza Towers - West Tower	139 m (456 ft)	37		
	Matina Enclaves Tower 4	100 m (330 ft)	27		
	Destine Davao Tower 2	76 m (249 ft)	22		
	Destine Davao Tower 3	76 m (249 ft)	22		
	The Piazza Building B	N/A	13		
	The Palazzo	N/A	13		
	Azuela Parcel 2 Tower 1	69 m (226 ft)	20		
	Azuela Parcel 2 Tower 2	69 m (226 ft)	20		
	Azuela Parcel 2 Tower 3	69 m (226 ft)	20		
	East Park Residences Tower 1	N/A	20		
	East Park Residences Tower 2	N/A	20		
	Sandera Residences Building 1	N/A	12		
	Downtowne Premier Residences Tower 3	N/A	28		
	Downtowne Premier Residences Tower 4	N/A	28		
	Downtowne Premier Residences Tower 5	N/A	28		
	De La Salle University at DGT	N/A	17		
	HCDC Green Building	N/A	15		
	Felcris Centrale Development	N/A	N/A		
	CCF Building	66.4 m (218 ft)	12		

== See also ==
- List of tallest buildings in Asia
- List of tallest buildings in the Philippines
- List of tallest buildings in Cagayan de Oro
