= Limketkai Center =

Shopping mall in Cagayan de Oro, Philippines

Limketkai Center 林克凱中心
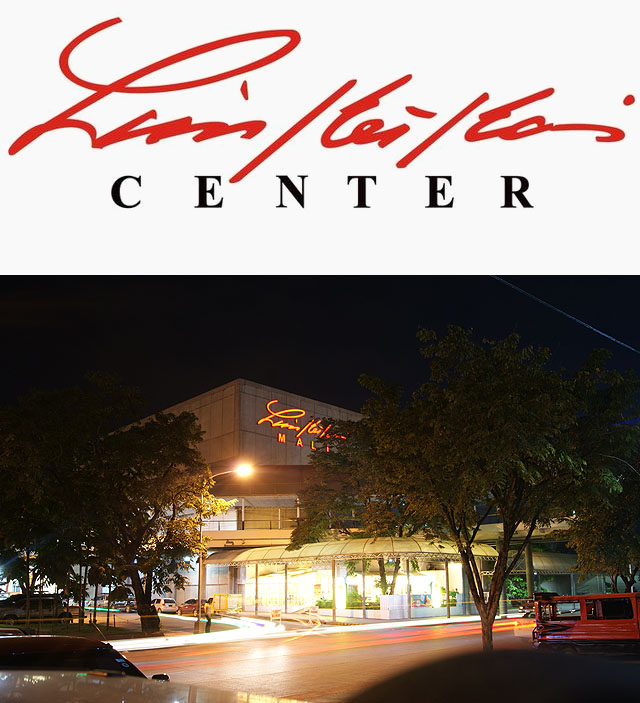
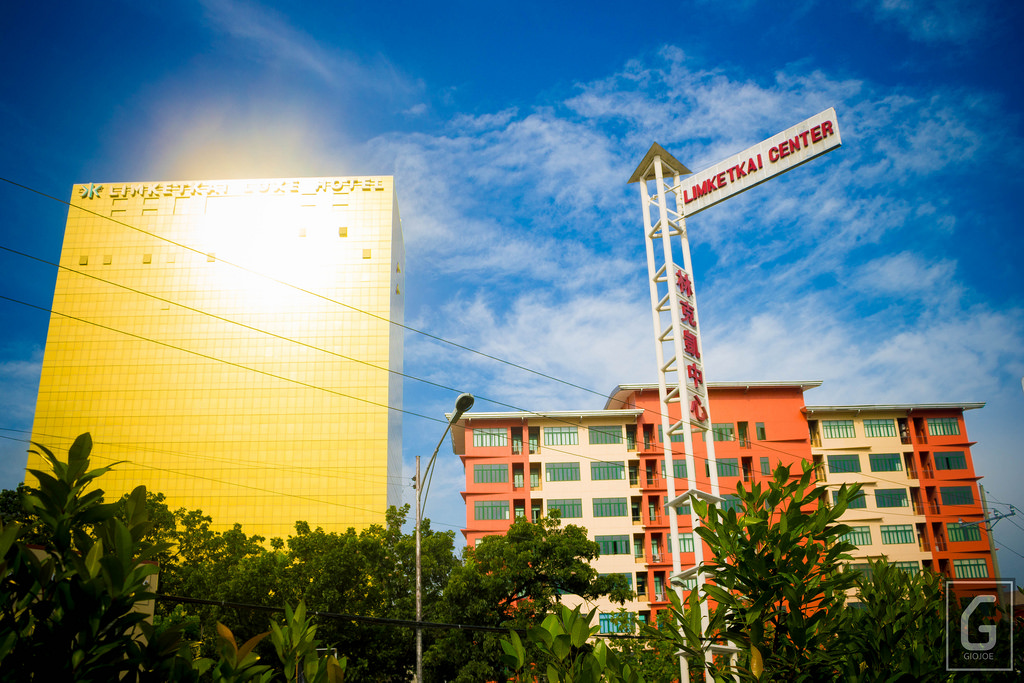
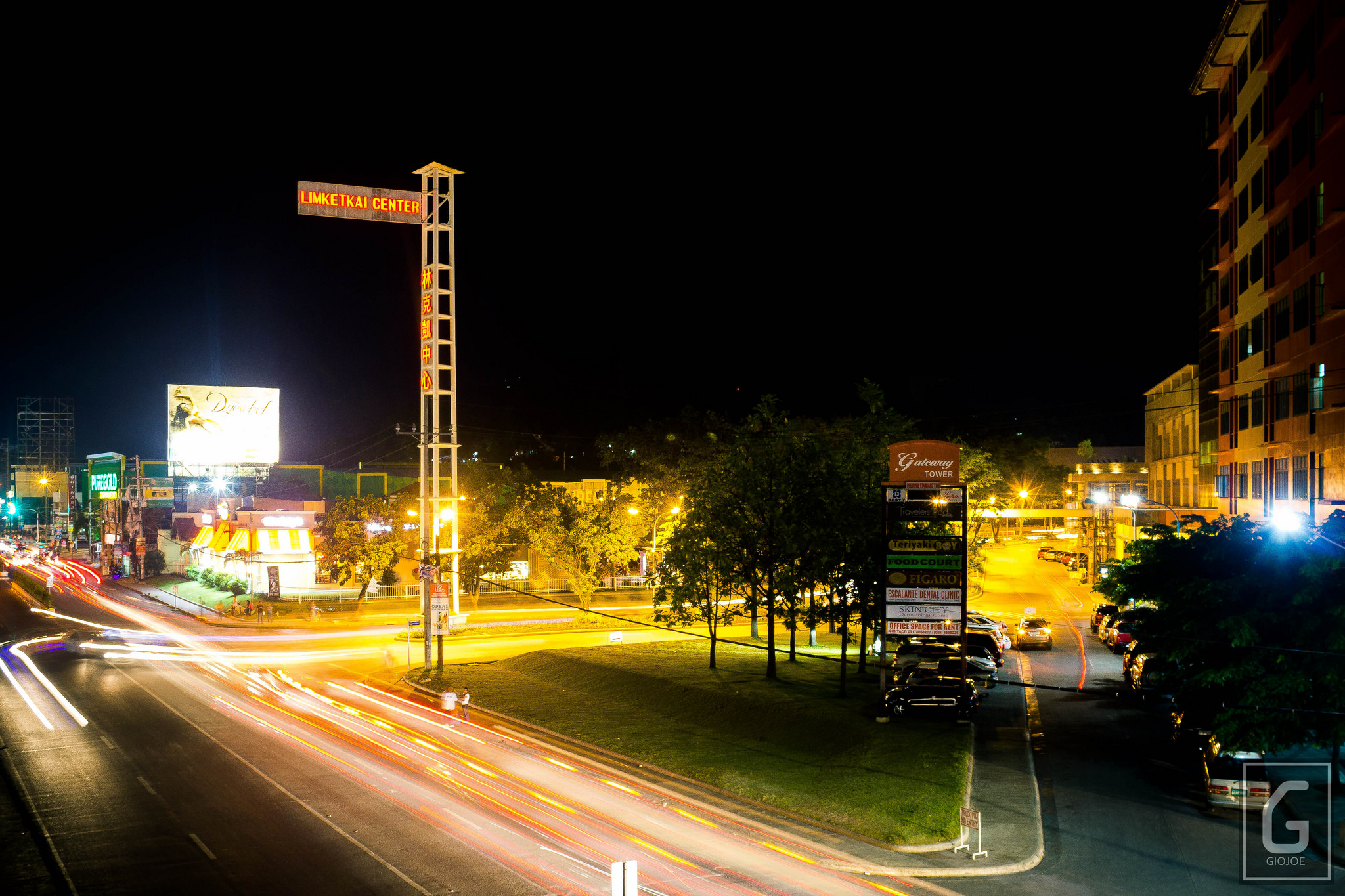
- Clockwise from top: Facade of Limketkai Mall, facade of Limketkai Luxe Hotel and Gateway Tower, The signage of Limketkai Mall along CM Recto Ave., inside the main mall
- Location: Cagayan de Oro, Misamis Oriental, Philippines
- Coordinates: 8°28′54″N 124°39′14″E
- Address: Limketkai Business Park, CM Recto Ave., corner Osmeña and Florentino Sts., Lapasan, Cagayan de Oro, 9000 Misamis Oriental
- Opened: 1991; 35 years ago
- Developer: Limketkai and Sons Inc.
- Manager: Limketkai and Sons Inc.
- Owner: Limketkai and Sons Inc.
- Num. of stores: 500
- Num. of anchor tenants: 6
- Floor area: 102,000 m^{2} (1,100,000 sq ft)
- Floors: Main Mall: 2; Mall Expansion: 4
- Parking: 1000 slots
- Website: www.limketkaicenter.com

Limketkai Center (Chinese: 林市場偕中心, or 林克凱中心; Pe̍h-ōe-jī: Lîm Khek-khái Tiong-sim; pinyin: Lín Kèkǎi Zhōngxīn) is a shopping mall in Cagayan de Oro, Philippines. Known by the locals as Ketkai, it is owned and developed by Limketkai and Sons, Inc., the largest factory and business district developer in the city.

Located in the city's central business district, particularly within the mixed-use 40 hectare Limketkai Center in Lapasan, the sprawling, two-storey mall has over 500 tenants, offering stores, boutique shops, fast-food chains and restaurants. It also offers facilities including four movie theatres, food courts, entertainment and day-care centers, spas and clinics. The first Robinsons Mall in the city, Robinsons Cagayan de Oro, is also located inside the mall complex. Limketkai Center also has a Mass every Sunday at the Our Lady of Manaoag Church.

== Anchor stores and services ==
=== Robinsons Cagayan de Oro ===
Located at the north concourse of this mall complex, Robinsons Cagayan de Oro is the first Robinsons Mall in Cagayan de Oro which was opened in 2002. It houses Robinsons Appliances, Robinsons Department Store, Robinsons Supermarket, Daiso, Handyman and anchor shops that is hosted by Robinsons Malls.

=== Limketkai Gateway Towers ===
Limketkai Gateway Towers is an 8-storey twin-tower office complex with commercial spaces on the first floor and a food hall on the second floor. Situated adjacent to the Limketkai Luxe Hotel and across from The Coffee Bean and Tea Leaf, it is connected to the mall via a skybridge. The first building commenced operations in 2009, while its twin was completed in 2016. Currently, it houses banks, Watsons, and Jollibee on the ground floor, with government and corporate offices occupying the upper floors.

=== Limketkai Luxe Hotel ===
Limketkai Luxe Hotel is a tower hotel that is located inside the mall complex. The 19-floor structure offers 100 guest rooms. The hotel was the first high-rise in the city and the tallest building until the completion of Centrio Tower in 2016. It is still the tallest hotel and fourth-tallest building in the city. The box-type tower is an iconic landmark to the city that is stand in solid gold, resembling Cagayan de Oro as the City of Golden Friendship.

Originally, Limketkai Luxe Hotel was planned as a 21-floor twin tower and was later changed to 19 and 36 floors. Tower 1 that is currently existing was completed and was opened in 2013, while tower 2 should add for another 216 guest rooms and 36 floors. However, the construction for tower 2 is currently on hold.

=== Limketkai Mall Module-2 BPO & Cyberpark ===
Located in the former parking lot across Robinsons Cagayan de Oro. Limketkai Mall Module-2 BPO & Cyberpark Building is a 4-storey building with 2 basements and a floor area of 32,676.21 sqm. with a lot size of 16,360 sqm and a gross leasable area of 10,631.10 sqm. It is currently occupied by the Philippine Statistics Authority on the ground floor and a BPO named Ubiquity on the fourth floor. Another US BPO firm named Qualfon is said to occupy one of the floors.

=== Shopwise ===
A two-level hypermarket operated by Robinsons Retail Holdings Inc., and is one of the mall's anchor stores.

=== Our Lady of Manaoag Chapel ===
Since the 1990s, Catholic Masses have been celebrated at Limketkai; first near the south concourse entrance, then at the Limketkai Atrium. In 2014, the Masses were moved to another location – this time to a brand-new Roman Catholic chapel inside the mall's east annex next to Shopwise. The chapel is dedicated to Our Lady of the Rosary of Manaoag.

=== All Home Cagayan de Oro ===
AllHome is a 4-storey building with a gross floor area of 15,000 square meters. Located in the former parking area and across the Loop Towers. It was opened in 2018 and is the 19th store. It will soon connect to the mall via a skywalk.

=== The Loop Towers ===
The Loop Towers consist of a 26-storey twin tower named the North and South Towers. Situated across from AllHome, these towers were developed by Vista Residences in a joint venture with Limketkai Sons Inc. This project marks their first high-rise condominium outside Metro Manila and is efficiently connected by a walkway. Each tower will accommodate 522 unique units, ranging from studios to one-bedroom, two-bedroom, and three-bedroom layouts. The North Tower was completed in 2020, while the South Tower is currently on hold.

== Entertainment ==
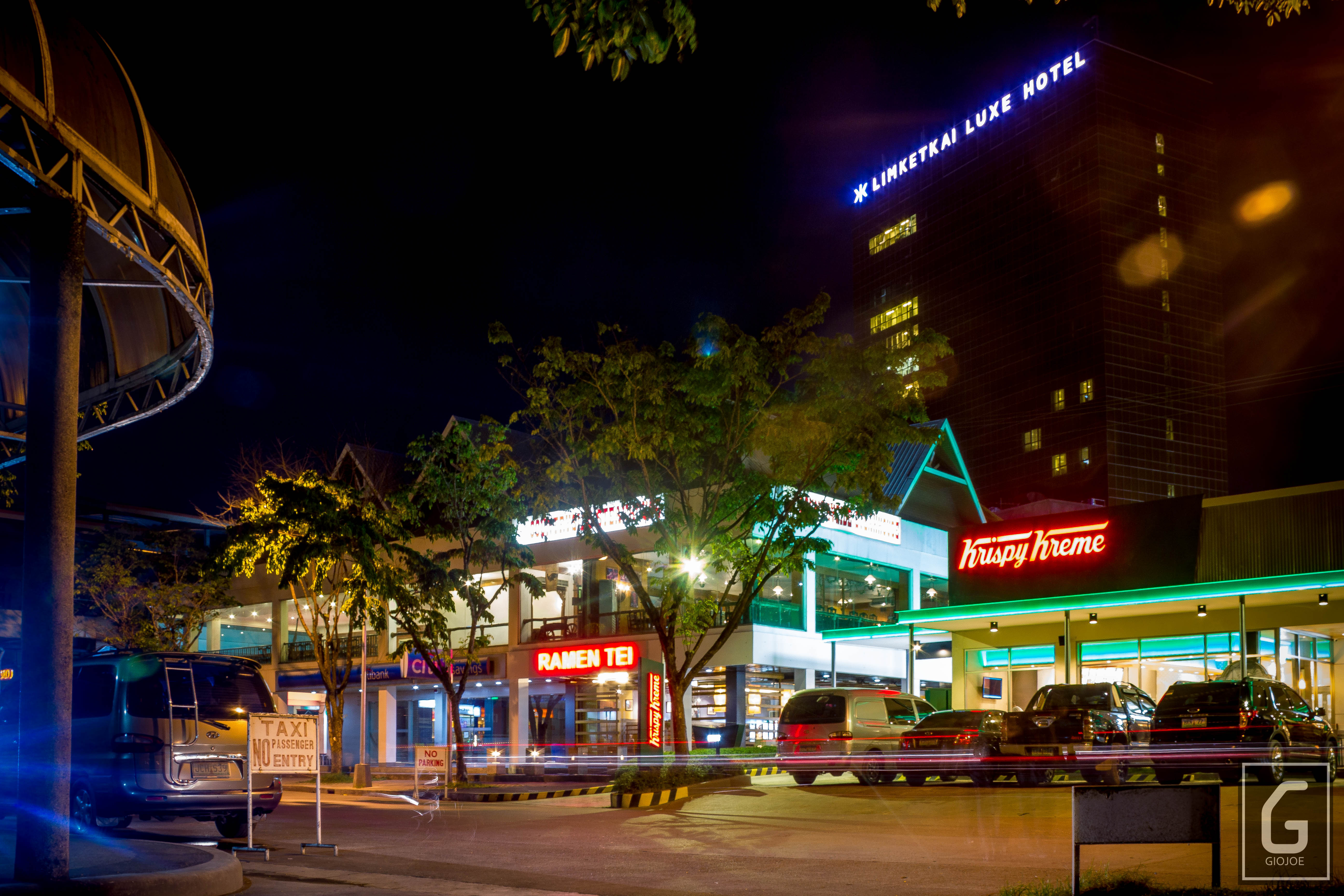
Rosario Arcade

=== Atrium ===
Limketkai Mall is home to an activity venue called the atrium. It has a 4,500 seat capacity, and has hosted many local, national and international conventions and concerts in the city yearly. It was also here where the city local candidates held their debate during the 2016 elections.

=== The rotunda ===
The rotunda is a circular event venue.

=== Cinemas ===
The mall houses four cinemas with one featuring Dolby Atmos, the first in the city.

All cinemas were permanently closed on March 1, 2025. The last screenings were on February 28, 2025, after three decades in service.

=== Rosario arcade ===
Rosario arcade is an al fresco area, and a popular bar strip in Cagayan de Oro which has been a night life and dining destination in the city.

== Expansion ==
Facade of Limketkai Mall

Since its opening in 1991, Limketkai Mall has been under constant renovation and expansion, in order to compete with the national retailers such as SM and Ayala that expand their businesses in the city.

In 2003, the mall made its general renovation in response to the newly-built SM City Cagayan de Oro (now SM City CDO Uptown). The mostly one-storey, open-air shopping center was converted into a two-storey, fully air-conditioned mall. The renovated main mall was connected then to Robinsons Big R (now Robinsons Cagayan de Oro) for the convenience of shoppers crossing between the two malls.

Most recent expansions include the east concourse Wing, which houses high-end fashion and lifestyle shops. Connecting the east concourse wing is a value-hypermarket, Shopwise, which has an indoor automated car park on its first level offering 500 slots.

The green lane, which surrounds the atrium, is a new expansion for high-end shops connecting the east and south concourses. The new glass-clad promenade was built directly above the south promenade and is lined with trees and plants, and is targeted as an upscale greenbelt corner.

The Limketkai skywalk connects the main mall to other buildings of the complex, such as the newly renovated and expanded Rosario Strip, Limketkai Luxe Hotel, Gateway Tower, and Gateway Park.

A four-storey building with leasable space and two basements serving as parking spaces known as Limketkai Mall Module-2 BPO & Cyberpark started construction in 2016. This building expansion will be connected then to the mall's north concourse.

Another multilevel building, now called AllHome, is said to rise soon at the mall's parking D area between Shell's gasoline station and the loop showroom. This building will be connected to the mall's south concourse.

== Incidents and controversies ==
=== Rosario Arcade bombing ===
A bomb explosion ripped through a row of upscale restaurants at Rosario Arcade on the night of July 26, 2013. The bombing killed at least six and injured 48 others, many of whom were members of the Philippine College of Chest Physicians, who were attending their national midyear convention held at nearby Grand Caprice.

Investigations found out that it was the Abu Sayyaf who led the incident and pointed out Renierlo Dongon as the primary suspect of the bombing. Dongon had served as a leader of the Khilafa Islamiya and once arrested sometime in 2013 and is connected as well to Abu Sayyaf.

In the midst of the Bohol clashes, Dongon, along with his wife Supt. Maria Cristina Nobleza, was later caught by the authorities on April 23, 2017.

=== Casino proposal ===
Since 2009, concerns have been raised from several church groups and organizations after a casino was planned to open inside the mall complex. The casino would be operated under Diamond Millenium Corporation, represented by Lorenzo U. Limketkai, and have a PAGCOR e-Games Station. It would be placed inside the Lifestyle Podium next to the Limketkai Luxe Hotel, which is currently under construction and was set to open in January 2018.

The Archdiocese of Cagayan de Oro expressed their opposition to this proposal, saying that the chapel could be removed and Mass would no longer be celebrated if the plan were to go ahead. The Committee on Trade and Commerce of the city's local government is yet to review the proposal.

== Gallery ==
The Rotunda, Limketkai Mall

Limketkai Luxe Hotel and the Gateway Tower by night

Limketkai Luxe Hotel

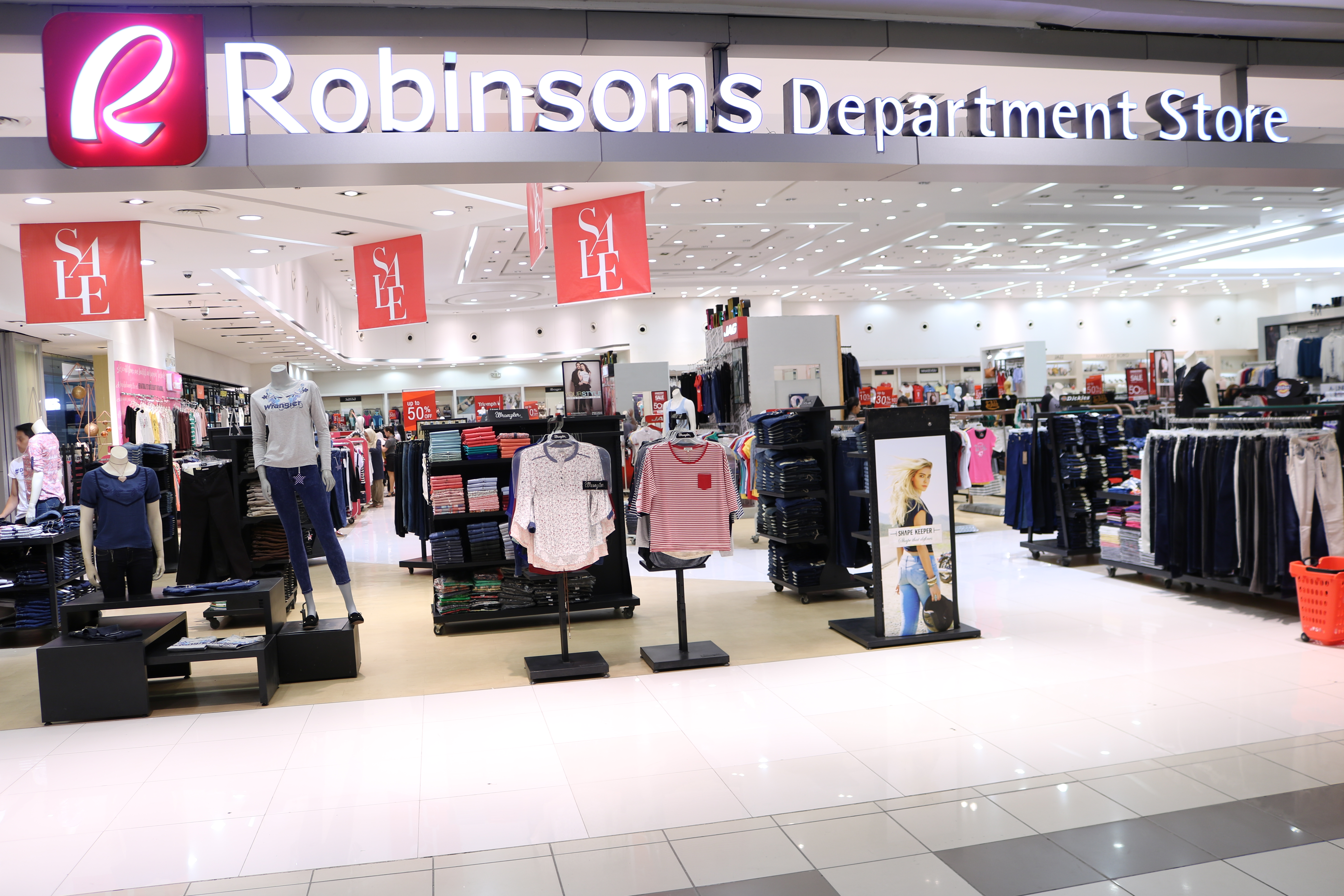
Robinson's Department Store, inside Limketkai Mall (Formerly Plaza Fair Department Store) 2nd level, South and West Concourse

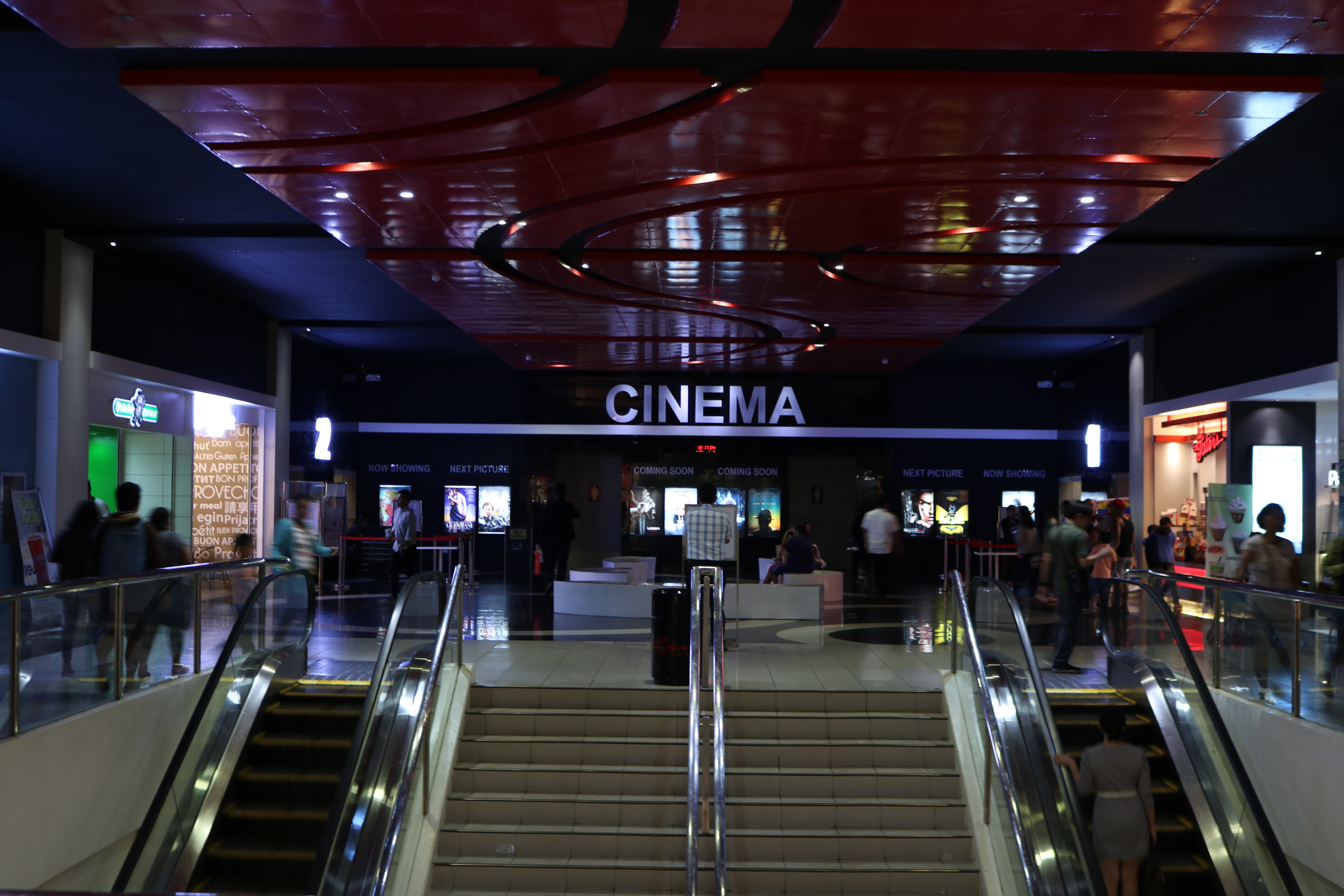
The Cinema, one of which is equipped with Dolby Atmos

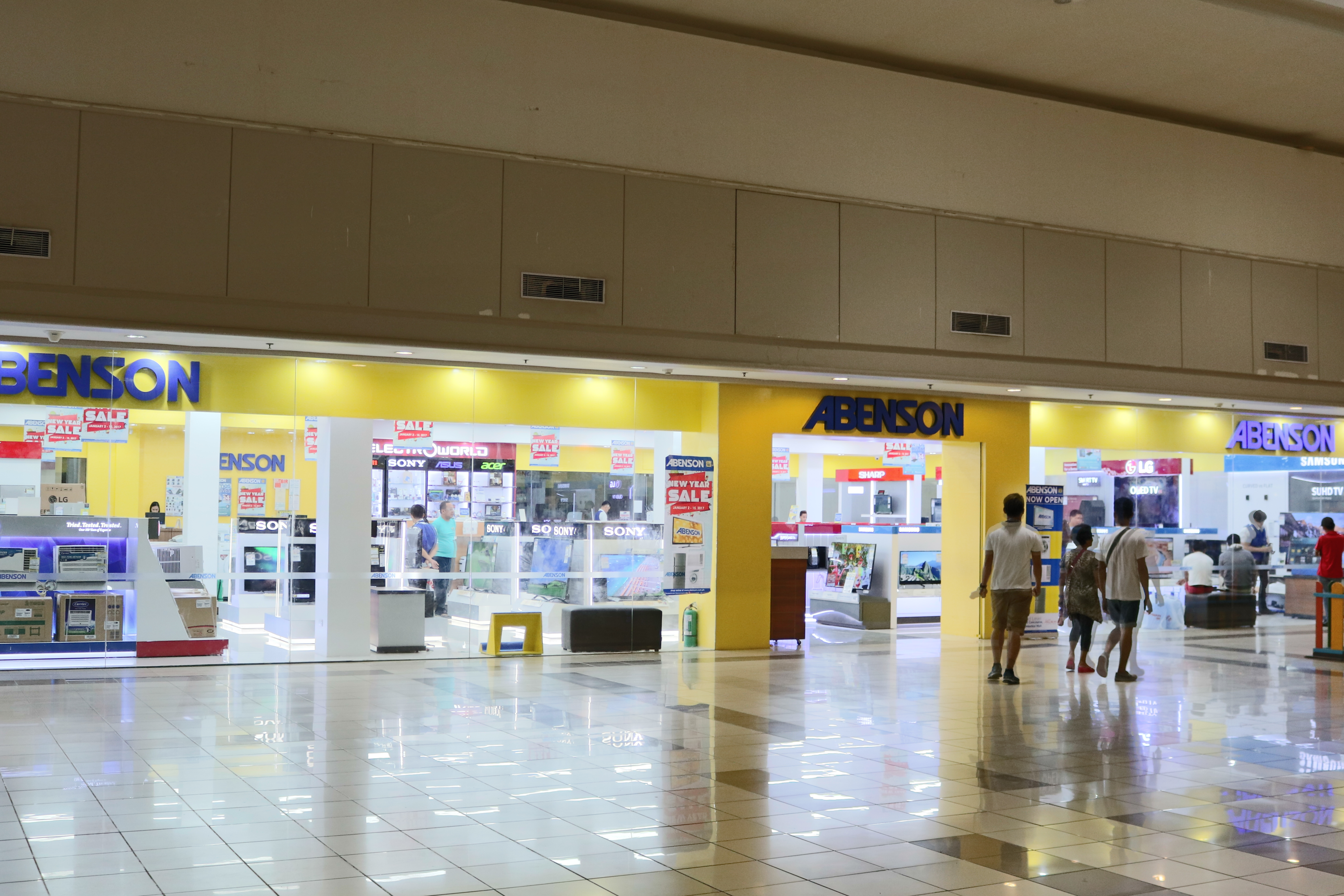
Abenson store

== See also ==
- List of shopping malls in the Philippines
- List of largest shopping malls in the Philippines
- Cagayan de Oro
- Robinsons Malls
- Vista Malls
