= Good Building Design and Construction in the Philippines =

2008 handbook by GTZ

- Author: UNISDR/UNDP/European Commission/GTZ
- Language: English
- Publication date: 2008
- Publication place: Philippines
- ISBN: 978-9-7194-1460-5

The Good Building Design and Construction in the Philippines is a handbook developed in cooperation with the German Technical Cooperation (GTZ), UNDP Regional Center in Bangkok, and the Secretariat of the United Nations International Strategy for Disaster Reduction.

The handbook aims to provide comprehensive information to house owners, designers, builders, and building monitors to teach principles of good design and construction in natural hazard-prone areas such as the Philippines.

== Main authors ==
Robin Willison, a Civil Engineer and a consultant for Disaster risk reduction has written the handbook and provided photographs through experience in tragedy recovery during impacts of hazards in the Philippines and Indonesia.

Olaf Neusser, is a disaster risk consultant for GTZ and has provided support for the assessment of building culture in Leyte and Samar through the effects of local catastrophe in the area.

== Analogy of good building structure ==
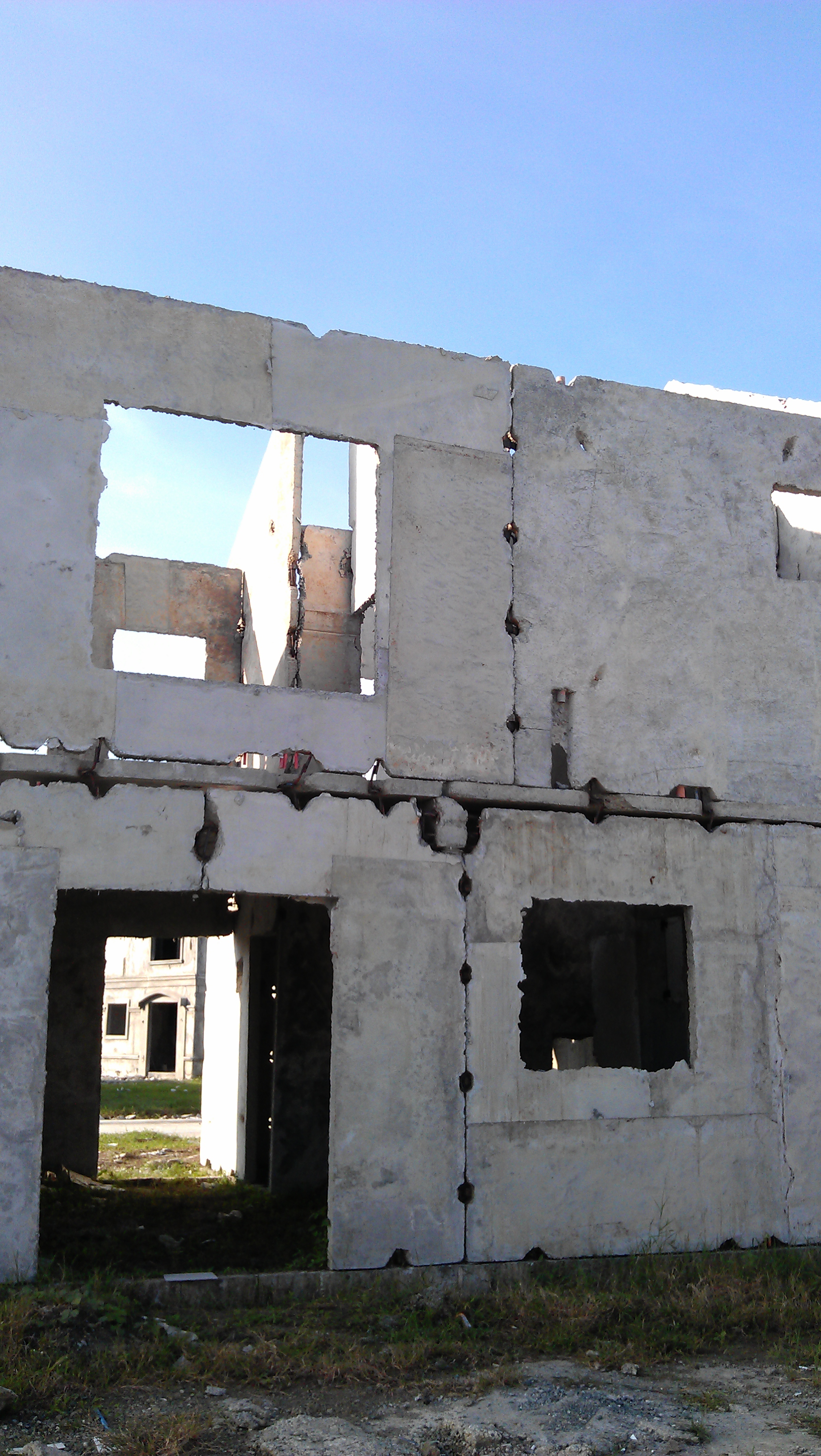
An example of how houses in the Philippines must not be built: No structural columns, no extruding column steel reinforcements to secure the roof, cracked walls even during construction phase which is indicative of improper construction materials

As the Philippines lies within the Pacific Ring of Fire where earthquakes and eruptions are more likely to occur as well as being at the edge of the Pacific Ocean where violent storms are likely to develop, proper construction philosophies and strategic location must be assessed so it can resist external forces.

=== Foundation ===
The book has given a detailed identification of proper house foundation and ground classification to ensure it is not liquefaction prone.

=== Structure ===
Principle of coherent structure and the importance of the presence of structural columns to support the walls and roof structure in the event of environmental hazards such as ravaging floods, strong winds and earthquakes.

=== Roof truss tying ===
Roof trusses must be welded to purlins and tied using extruding column steel reinforcements. to ensure it is fixed properly to the columns and will not fly off during strong winds.

=== Proper location ===
The proper location has been discussed in the handbook to ensure that the ground below is sturdy enough to support the weight of the structure. It must be composed of bedrock and must not be landfilled and is away from slopes and river beds.

=== Construction materials ===
Broken rough rocks and fine sand must be used and must be free from external sediments as they may affect the strength of the concrete mix.
