= Romolo Nati =

Italian architect and businessman (born 1968)

Romolo Valentino Benedetto Nati
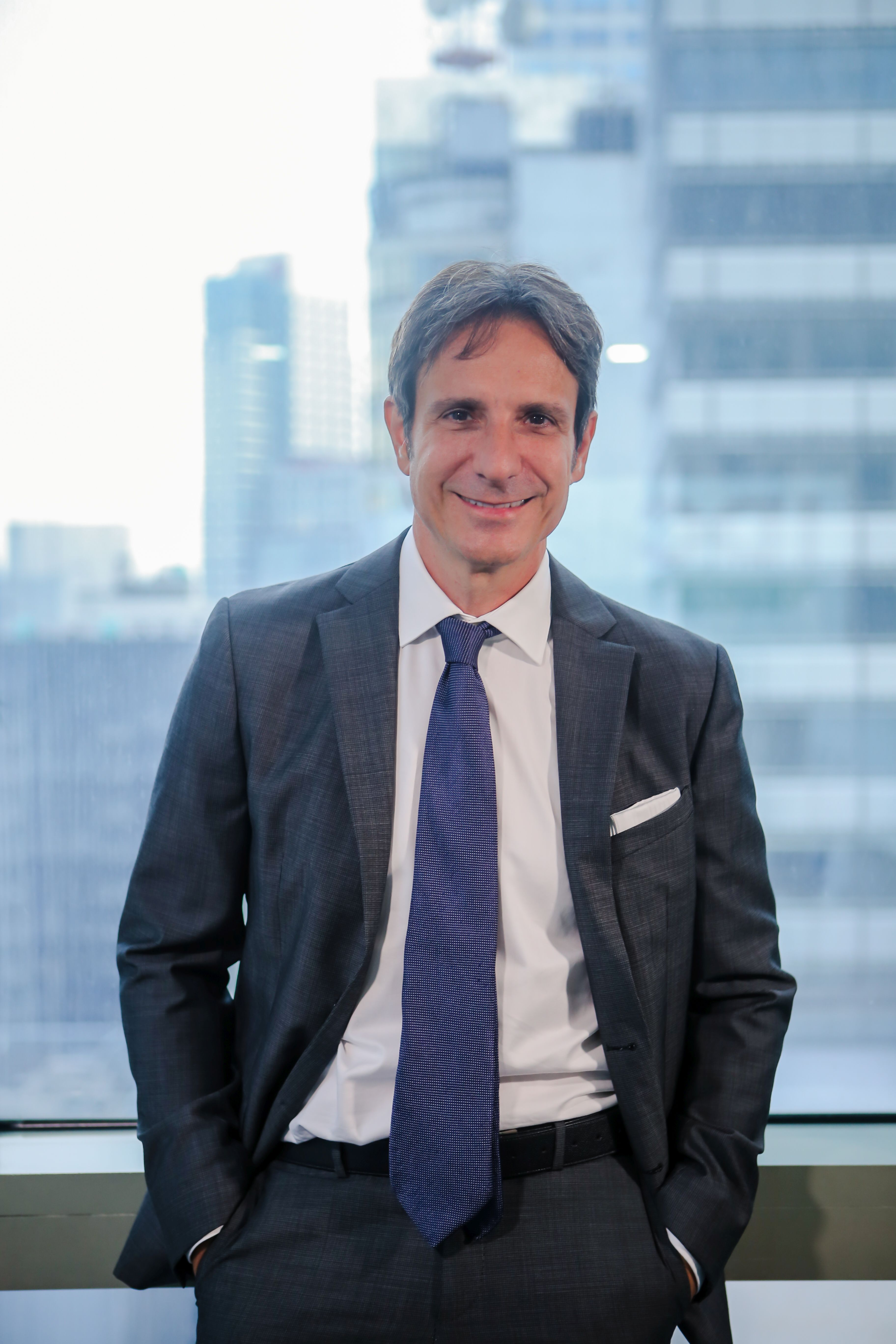
- Born: February 14, 1968 (age 58); Rome, Italy
- Education: Sapienza Universita; University of Tallinn; and Asian Institute of Management
- Occupations: Architect; Executive chairman and Chief Design Adviser of Italpinas Development Corporation; Former Vice Chairman of Constellation Energy Corporation
- Website: italpinas.com

Romolo Valentino Benedetto Nati (born February 14, 1968) is an Italian architect and entrepreneur who employs biomimicry to create sustainable real estate and energy projects. He is the Co-Founder, Executive Chairman, and Chief Design Adviser of Italpinas Development Corporation (IDC), a publicly listed real estate development firm in the Philippines.

== Career ==
Romolo Nati's passion for design was first reflected in the automotive industry. in 1999, he participated in several design competitions, earning two awards, including recognition from renowned car makers Mitsubishi and BMW. These early achievements helped shape the creative foundation of his career and opened doors for his architectural journey.

Italpinas Development Corporation

In 2007, Nati came to the Philippines and introduced "Green Architecture". In 2009, Nati and Jose D. Leviste III, co-founded the Italpinas Euroasian Design and Eco-development Corporation (ITPI). Leviste is a Sydney-based Filipino lawyer.

ITPI was later renamed Italpinas Development Corporation (IDC), which has since evolved into a publicly listed company with four wholly owned subsidiaries: IDC Prime, IDC Homes, PRIMA, and Edil-Impresa.

IDC Prime serves as the company's branded residences arm, specializing in sustainable developments for the upper market. Meanwhile, IDC homes focuses on providing sustainable and affordable housing solutions for the mass market. The first project of the IDC is Primavera Residences , a mixed-use condominium inside Pueblo de Oro Business Park in Cagayan de Oro, Philippines. Followed by Primavera City, a multi-phase Italian inspired complex that will feature the first Citadines serviced apart'hotel in Northern Mindanao. Meanwhile in Luzon, Miramonti Green Residences in Sto. Tomas, Batangas stands tall as the only mixed-use residential development in Light Industry & Science Park III.

== Education ==
Born in Rome, Italy, Nati pursued a degree in Architecture and Design at Sapienza Universita di Roma, where he graduated summa cum laude. A few years later, he received his master's degree in Urban Landscape and Layers at the University of Tallinn in Estonia. He also earned a Master's degree in Business Administration from Asian Institute of Management (AIM).

== Style ==
Inspired by biomimicry, Nati considers natural conditions and sustainable energy in designing his buildings. He shapes every building so that it acts like a sailboat: The sailboat catches the wind, not fight against it.

Nati believes that shelters and entire cities should be constructed without harming nature. He also explains that buildings can be made to withstand severe weather. In response to the damage caused by typhoon Yolanda to the Philippines, Nati said, “Buildings and cities can be planned, designed and developed to minimize and in some cases avoid damage created by 20-foot storm surges and other extreme conditions."

== Buildings ==
Following are the green buildings that Nati has designed as architect of IDC:

- Primavera Residences (Pueblo de Oro, Cagayan de Oro City)
- Primavera City (Pueblo de Oro, Cagayan de Oro City)
- Miramonti Green Residences I (Santo Tomas, Batangas)
- Miramonti Green Residences II (Santo Tomas, Batangas)
- Verona Green Residences (Uptown Cagayan de Oro City)
- Verona Green Residences (Gusa, Cagayan de Oro City)
- Firenze Green Tower (Limketkai Drive, Cagayan de Oro City)
- Moena Mountain Estate Residences (Dahilayan, Bukidnon)
- Baia Verde Green Estate (Morong, Bataan)

== See also ==
- Italpinas Development Corporation
- Primavera City
- Miramonti Green Residences
- Verona Green Residences
- Primavera Residences
