= Centrio Mall =

Ayala Malls Centrio

- Location: Cagayan de Oro, Misamis Oriental, Philippines
- Coordinates: 8°29′06″N 124°39′04″E
- Address: Claro M. Recto Avenue cor. Corrales Avenue and Cpt. Vicente Roa St.
- Opened: November 9, 2012; 13 years ago
- Developer: Cagayan de Oro Gateway Corporation (a joint-venture between Ayala Land; Davao-Based Anflo Management and Investment Corporation)
- Manager: Ayala Malls
- Owner: Ayala Corporation
- Architect: DDT Konstract Inc.
- Num. of stores: 300+
- Num. of anchor tenants: 2
- Floor area: Mall: 64,000 m^{2} (690,000 sq ft); Hotel: 8,000 m^{2} (86,000 sq ft); BPO: 11,380 m^{2} (122,500 sq ft); Condominium: TBA
- Floors: Mall: 3; Hotel: 8; BPO: 4; Condominium: 23
- Website: Centrio Malls

Ayala Malls Centrio, also known as Centrio Mall, is an integrated mixed-use complex composed of a shopping mall, a hotel, a BPO/office building and a condominium tower located along Captain Vicente Roa St. and corner Corrales and Claro M. Recto Avenues, Cagayan de Oro, Philippines.

Following the concept of "shop, dine, live, work, and play", Ayala Malls Centrio occupies 3.7 hectares in the city's central business district. It is also across the road from Gaisano City Mall and one block away from SM CDO Downtown, as well as Limketkai Center.

Ayala Malls Centrio is owned by the Ayala Corporation and has an estimated cost of ₱5 billion.

== Centrio Mall ==
The three-level mall (excluding the basement level that serves as a parking space) has a gross floor area of 64,000 m^{2} (690,000 sq ft) and 44,000 m^{2} (470,000 sq ft) for a gross leasable area.

During the construction period, Ayala executives decided to preserve two old acacia trees, which are believed to be 60 years old. The mall's alfresco area was built around the two large trees, which became the foundation of its mini-park called Centrio Mall Garden.

The mall's major anchor stores are Rustan's Fresh, and a two-level Robinsons Department Store. The mall is also the location of the Department of Foreign Affairs Consular Office Cagayan de Oro, a passport office serving the Northern Mindanao region which opened at the third level in June 2014.

Home of more than 300 tenants composed of local, national and international brands of stores, boutiques, clinics, service centers and restaurants, the mall opened on November 9, 2012. It has four cinemas.

Today, Centrio Mall since its opening is becoming a venue, mostly of local trade fairs, fashion shows, exhibitions, concerts and other events being held either in activity center, which can accommodate more than 300 people, or in the garden.

== Centrio Corporate Center ==
Centrio Corporate Center is Ayala Land’s premier office development in Cagayan de Oro. It is a 4-storey building sitting on top of the mall, technically making it a 7-storey building. It is a joint venture between Ayala Land Inc. and the Anflo Group. With approximately 11,380 square meters of gross floor area for traditional and BPO or KPO companies operating in Cagayan de Oro City, Centrio Corporate Center is located in a mixed-use development, together with Centrio Tower, Centrio Mall, and Seda Centrio.

== Seda Centrio Hotel ==
Seda Centrio Hotel is an 8-storey hotel sitting on top of the mall, technically making it a 12-storey hotel. It opened in 2012, making it the second branch to open after the Seda Hotel in BGC, which opened the same year.

== Centrio Tower ==
Centrio Tower is a 23-storey condominium tower. It is owned and developed by the Cagayan De Oro Gateway Corp., a joint venture between Ayala Land Inc. and the Antonio Floirendo Group of Companies of Davao. The tower will house 21 floors of residential units above two parking levels. Two commercial units will be located at the ground floor. The tower will also have swimming pools, a multi-purpose hall, outdoor exercise and play equipment, as well as open areas as its amenities.

== Incidents ==
On Sunday, May 14, 2017, a fire took place at Gerry's Grill on Centrio Mall's second floor. It was reported at 8:27 pm and was contained by 9:00 pm. According to the initial investigation, the fire started in the restaurant's kitchen and may have been caused by dust particles in the chimney that combined with the hot temperature from the grilling machine.

== See also ==
- Ayala Malls
