= Italpinas =

Italian-Filipino design and real estate development firm

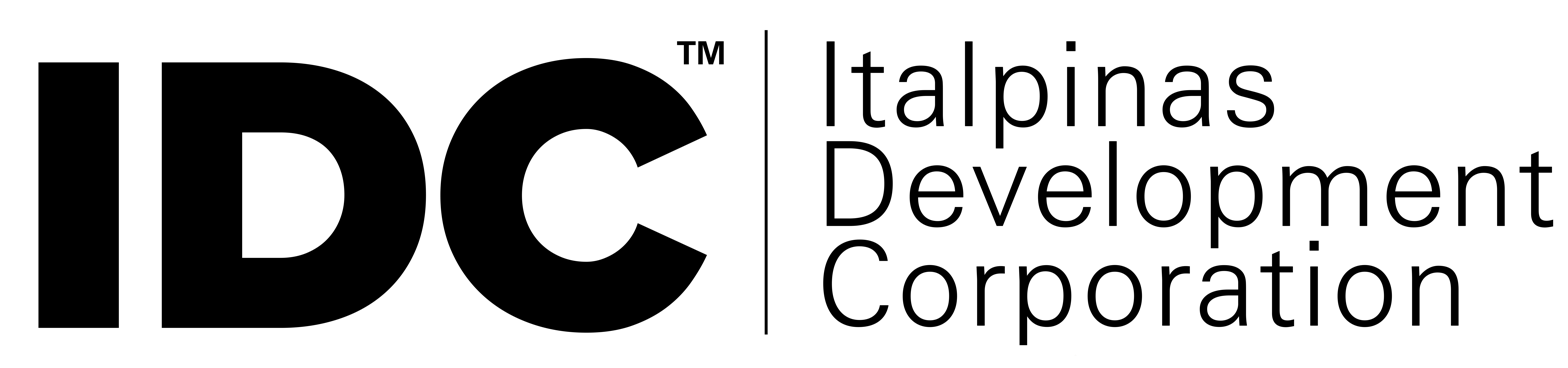
- Formerly: Italpinas Euroasian Design and Eco-development Corporation
- Company type: Public company
- Traded as: PSE: IDC
- Industry: Real Estate
- Founded: Jan 26 2009
- Founders: Arch. Romolo Nati, Atty. Jose D. Leviste III
- Headquarters: 9F Countryspace Bldg, 133 H.V. Dela Costa St., Makati, Philippines
- Number of locations: 2: Romolo V. Nati (Chairman & CEO); Jose D. Leviste III (President)
- Products: Primavera Residences, Primavera City, Miramonti
- Services: Sales, Leasing
- Website: www.italpinas.com

Italpinas Development Corporation (IDC) is an Italian-Filipino design and real estate development firm, headed by Italian architect Romolo V. Nati (Chairman and CEO) and Filipino lawyer Jose D. Leviste III (President). The real estate development firm held its initial public offering (IPO) on Monday, December 7, 2015.

== History ==
IDC was established in 2009 by Nati and Leviste, envisioning a “green future” for the Philippines. Its principal services are real estate development and general design, including architectural, site-planning and survey, construction, interior design and management with specialization of alternative and environmentally friendly design. IDC also specializes in green housing design and construction. Additionally, IDC also renders marketing and financial management and planning. It was originally called Italpinas Euroasian Design and Eco-Development Corporation (ITPI Corp.). In 2010, IDC finished its first project, Primavera Residences, a residential condominium in Cagayan de Oro, Philippines.

IDC won the 2014 Pacific Property Award for Best Mixed-Use Development in the Philippines and the 2011 Southeast Asia Property Award (SEAPA) for Best Condo Development in the Philippines. The company was also a finalist in the Most Promising Clean Energy Investment Opportunities at the 2010 CTI-PFAN Asia Forum for Clean Energy.

== Projects ==
- Primavera City - (Cagayan de Oro) IDC's second ground breaking project located in Uptown Cagayan de Oro. This project is a seven-tower building with the first six composed of commercial, office and residential units in a total of twelve floors while the seventh is a 32-storey hotel tower. This integrated building is designed with both passive and active green strategies such as semi-transparent photovoltaic panels, rain harvesting and cooling system.
- Primavera Residences – (Cagayan de Oro) The first eco-friendly mixed-use development in Cagayan de Oro, a 10-storey twin-building complex comprising residential, commercial and office spaces. The complex is designed with passive cooling features that minimize the impact on the environment.
- Verona Green Apartments – (Cagayan de Oro) New joint venture project in Uptown Cagayan de Oro. And just recently, IDC stated that VERONA GREEN APARTMENTS consisting of a series of four-storey walk-up green buildings offering both residential and commercial space would be the company’s first venture into the economic housing market.
- Coral City – (Quezon City, Philippines) A 30,000 square-meter self-sustaining and weather-proof architectural design concept for a mixed-use socialized housing project (residential and commercial). The design will include courtyards, flood-proof shelters and parking spaces.
- Miramonti – (Santo Tomas, Batangas) An advanced green complex comprising residential, commercial and parking spaces. The complex will be using renewable and self-sustaining energy while also boasting passive cooling technology in the complex.
- A Shelter of Light – (Payatas, Quezon City) A design concept using recyclable materials for an eco-friendly, self-sustaining multipurpose public hall in Payatas, Quezon City

== Honors and awards ==
- 2019, Best Mixed-use Development in the Philippines, "Miramonti Green Residences", International Property Awards (Asia Pacific)
- 2018, Best Innovation Project of the Year 2018, "Miramonti Green Residences", The Outlook - Lamudi; Manila, Philippines
- 2017, Best Mixed-use Development in the Philippines, "Primavera City", International Property Awards (Asia Pacific)
- 2016, Leadership in Green Building Award 2016, Philippine Green Building Council, “Primavera Residences”; Taguig, Philippines
- 2015, EDGE ( Excellence in Design for Greater Efficiencies), ”Primavera Residences”, IFC World Bank
- 2014, Best Mixed-use Development in the Philippines, "Primavera Residences", Internationational Property Awards (Asia Pacific); Kuala Lumpur, Malaysia
- 2014, One of the Philippines’ New Business Leaders, National Geographic Magazine (Feb 2014)
- 2013, One of the Most Promising Clean Energy Investment Opportunity, “Primavera Residences", CTI-PFAN
- 2011, One of the Best Condo Development in the Philippines, “Primavera Residences”; South East Asia Property Awards, Singapore
- 2010, The Most Promising Clean Energy Investment Opportunities, “Primavera Residences”; CTI-PFA
