= Cebu Landmasters =

Cebu Landmasters, Inc.
- Company type: Public
- Traded as: PSE: CLI
- Industry: Real estate
- Founded: September 26, 2003; 22 years ago in Cebu City, Philippines
- Founder: Jose Soberano III
- Headquarters: 10th Floor, Park Centrale Tower, Cebu I.T. Park, J.M. Del Mar Street, Lahug, Cebu City; Manila Office: CWC Design Center, 814 A. Arnaiz St., San Lorenzo Village, Makati Central Business District, Makati City, Metro Manila, Philippines
- Area served: Visayas and Mindanao, Philippines
- Key people: Jose Franco Boremeo Soberano (Chairman, President, and CEO)
- Revenue: ▲ ₱11.162 billion (2021)
- Net income: ▲ ₱2.67 billion (2021)
- Total assets: ▲ ₱66.652 billion (2021)
- Number of employees: 600+ (2021)
- Subsidiaries: A.S. Fortuna Property Ventures, Inc. Cebu Landmasters Property Management, Inc. CLI Premier Hotels International, Inc.
- Website: cebulandmasters.com

Cebu Landmasters, Inc., is a Filipino real estate company. It was founded by Jose Soberano III on September 26, 2003. The head office is in Cebu City. It was listed on the Philippine Stock Exchange on June 2, 2017., as of March 5 2026, the CEO is Jose Franco Boremeo Soberano after Jose Soberano III's retirement.

== See also ==
- Davao Global Township
