= List of largest banks in the Philippines =

These are the largest banks in the Philippines ranked by total assets as published by Bangko Sentral ng Pilipinas (BSP).

== Universal and commercial banks ==
=== As of 31 March 2025 ===
Rank	Bank name	Assets (millions of PHP)
1	BDO Unibank, Inc.	4,693,853.77
2	Land Bank of the Philippines (LandBank)	3,426,491.20
3	Bank of the Philippine Islands (BPI)	3,269,249.37
4	Metropolitan Bank & Trust Company (Metrobank)	3,183,188.10
5	China Banking Corporation (Chinabank)	1,787,807.58
6	Rizal Commercial Banking Corporation (RCBC)	1,509,240.28
7	Security Bank Corporation	1,417,776.55
8	Philippine National Bank (PNB)	1,287,325.38
9	Development Bank of the Philippines (DBP)	1,038,111.93
10	Union Bank of the Philippines (UnionBank)	1,007,875.53
11	East West Banking Corporation (EastWest Bank)	499,438.87
12	Asia United Bank Corporation (AUB)	378,478.14
13	Citibank, N.A.	362,828.80
14	Hongkong & Shanghai Banking Corporation (HSBC)	310,381.56
15	Bank of Commerce (BankCom)	255,585.85
16	Philippine Trust Company (Philtrust Bank)	174,897.11
17	Philippine Bank of Communications (PBCOM)	163,293.61
18	MUFG Bank Ltd.	129,160.08
19	Maybank Philippines, Inc.	109,004.17
20	Standard Chartered Bank Philippines (SCB PH)	106,746.37
21	CTBC Bank (Philippines) Corporation	88,271.03
22	Mizuho Bank Ltd. – Manila Branch	87,826.75
23	JPMorgan Chase Bank, N.A.	86,686.07
24	Philippine Veterans Bank	77,040.92
25	Bank of China (Hongkong) – Manila Branch	63,354.98
26	Deutsche Bank AG	58,878.61
27	CIMB Bank Philippines, Inc.	48,615.81
28	Sumitomo Mitsui Banking Corporation – Manila Branch	47,949.77
29	Australia and New Zealand Banking Group Ltd. (ANZ)	34,417.58
30	Bank of America, N.A.	33,138.97
31	ING Bank N.V.	32,617.97
32	BDO Private Bank, Inc.	31,099.56
33	KEB Hana Bank – Manila Branch	24,253.68
34	Bangkok Bank Public Co. Ltd.	11,786.54
35	Mega International Commercial Bank Co. Ltd.	10,840.56
36	Shinhan Bank – Manila Branch	9,454.10
37	Industrial Bank of Korea – Manila Branch	8,686.95
38	Industrial and Commercial Bank of China – Manila Branch	7,866.87
39	Hua Nan Commercial Bank Ltd. – Manila Branch	7,120.22
40	Cathay United Bank Co. Ltd. – Manila Branch	7,063.92
41	Chang Hwa Commercial Bank Ltd. – Manila Branch	7,058.81
42	United Overseas Bank Ltd. – Manila Branch	4,634.65
43	First Commercial Bank Ltd. – Manila Branch	3,975.18
44	Al-Amanah Islamic Investment Bank of the Philippines	1,186.49

== Thrift banks ==
=== As of 31 March 2025 ===
Top thrift banks by assets (in millions of PHP)
Rank	Bank name	Assets (millions of PHP)
1	Philippine Savings Bank (PSBank)	220,559.48
2	China Bank Savings, Inc. (CBS)	194,961.41
3	Philippine Business Bank, Inc. (PBB)	161,185.27
4	City Savings Bank, Inc. (CSB)	153,876.90
5	Sterling Bank of Asia, Inc.	60,564.50
6	BPI Direct BanKo, Inc.	57,361.64
7	Bank of Makati, Inc. (BMI)	53,657.06
8	Producers Savings Bank Corporation	39,142.28
9	First Consolidated Bank, Inc. (FCB)	29,536.88
10	UCPB Savings Bank	17,399.07
11	1st Valley Bank, Inc.	14,881.69
12	CARD SME Bank, Inc.	12,708.03
13	Legazpi Savings Bank, Inc.	12,245.57
14	Wealth Development Bank Corporation	10,345.61
15	Malayan Savings Bank, Inc.	9,163.36
16	Equicom Savings Bank, Inc.	8,606.41
17	Citystate Savings Bank, Inc.	6,682.05
18	Luzon Development Bank	6,532.82
19	AllBank, Inc.	6,422.20
20	Bangko Kabayan, Inc.	5,120.82
21	Sun Savings Bank, Inc.	4,097.39
22	QueenCity Development Bank (QueenBank)	3,824.68
23	Yuanta Savings Bank Philippines, Inc.	2,609.01
24	Bank One Savings Corporation	2,483.74
25	Dumaguete City Development Bank, Inc.	2,238.01
26	Penbank, Inc. (formerly Peninsula RB)	2,147.37
27	Century Savings Bank Corporation	1,847.69
28	Rizal MicroBank, Inc.	1,581.33
29	Isla Bank, Inc.	1,362.79
30	Hiyas Banking Corporation	1,196.22
31	Makiling Development Bank Corporation	1,137.04
32	LOLC Bank Philippines, Inc.	1,093.00
33	NorthPoint Development Bank, Inc.	1,056.57
34	University Savings Bank, Inc.	797.89
35	Pampanga Development Bank	723.93
36	Pacific Ace Savings Bank, Inc.	699.37
37	Cordillera Savings Bank, Inc.	558.50
38	Bataan Development Bank	504.81
39	Life Savings Bank, Inc.	424.20
40	Phil Star Development Bank, Inc.	248.57
41	Lemery Savings and Loan Bank, Inc.	229.71

== Rural and cooperative banks ==
=== As of 31 March 2025 ===
Rank	Bank name	Assets (millions of PHP)
1	BDO Network Bank, Inc.	130,941.50
2	EastWest Rural Bank, Inc. (EWRB)	41,824.95
3	Seabank Philippines, Inc.	37,326.32
4	CARD Bank, Inc.	31,406.32
5	Cebuana Lhuillier Rural Bank, Inc.	9,676.15
6	Own Bank – The Rural Bank of Cavite City, Inc.	9,642.46
7	Guagua Rural Bank, Inc.	8,895.03
8	CARD MRI Rizal Bank, Inc.	7,814.18
9	Agribusiness Rural Bank, Inc.	6,940.14
10	Rural Bank of Angeles, Inc.	6,026.53
11	Bank of Florida (BOF, Inc.)	5,900.31
12	Top Bank Philippines, Inc.	5,794.36
13	First Isabela Cooperative Bank (FICO Bank)	5,686.68
14	TRBank, Inc.	5,195.11
15	One Cooperative Bank	5,056.21
16	Quezon Capital Rural Bank, Inc.	4,384.38
17	Rang-ay Bank, Inc.	4,258.81
18	Enterprise Bank, Inc.	3,665.28
19	GM Bank of Luzon, Inc.	3,542.52
20	Cooperative Bank of Cotabato	3,367.72
21	Mindanao Consolidated Cooperative Bank	3,343.05
22	NetBank (A Rural Bank), Inc.	3,156.37
23	Summit Bank (Rural Bank of Tublay, Inc.)	2,872.63
24	Katipunan Banking Corporation	2,834.99
25	Rural Bank of Porac (Pampanga), Inc.	2,720.33
26	Cantilan Bank, Inc.	2,590.01
27	Marayo Bank, Inc.	2,501.36
28	Ilocos Consolidated Cooperative Bank	2,416.82
29	Camalig Bank, Inc.	2,082.74
30	New Rural Bank of San Leonardo (N.E.), Inc.	2,056.38
31	Bangko Mabuhay (A Rural Bank), Inc.	1,891.69
32	Mt. Carmel Rural Bank, Inc.	1,817.24
33	Rural Bank of Barili (Cebu), Inc.	1,743.03
34	Rural Bank of Cauayan, Inc.	1,666.85
35	First Imperial Business Bank, Inc.	1,665.10
36	Rural Bank of Digos, Inc.	1,651.02
37	ASPAC Rural Bank, Inc.	1,612.60
38	Rural Bank of Guinobatan, Inc.	1,591.30
39	MVSM Bank, Inc.	1,558.65
40	One Unified Rural Bank of Cavite, Inc.	1,485.72
41	Zambales Rural Bank, Inc.	1,464.56
42	Rural Bank of Central Pangasinan (Bayambang), Inc.	1,400.80
43	Rural Bank of Sta. Rosa (Laguna), Inc.	1,350.88
44	Mactan Rural Bank, Inc.	1,337.21
45	LifeBank – A Rural Bank	1,335.45
46	Imus Rural Bank, Inc.	1,332.94
47	Bayanihan Bank, Inc.	1,294.07
48	First Philippine Partners Bank, Inc.	1,251.56
49	Cooperative Bank of Benguet (CBB)	1,204.28
50	Malarayat Rural Bank, Inc.	1,189.80
51	Rural Bank of Rizal (Zamboanga del Norte), Inc.	1,187.22
52	Rural Bank of Lebak (Sultan Kudarat), Inc.	1,174.84
53	Rural Bank of San Mateo (Isabela), Inc.	1,171.91
54	First Trubank – A Rural Bank, Inc.	1,159.92
55	Cooperative Bank of Quezon Province	1,134.16
56	Mallig Plains Rural Bank, Inc.	1,117.47
57	Gateway Rural Bank, Inc.	1,103.50
58	RBT Bank, Inc.	1,100.00
59	Rural Bank of Solano (Nueva Vizcaya), Inc.	1,097.39
60	Bankways, Inc.	1,048.16
61	Dungganon Bank, Inc.	1,042.24
62	Highland Rural Bank, Inc.	1,036.55
63	Rural Bank of Rosario (La Union), Inc.	987.15
64	Rural Bank of Magdalena (Laguna), Inc.	973.92
65	Cooperative Bank of Palawan	953.86
66	Village Bank, Inc.	921.01
67	Rural Bank of Sta. Ignacia, Inc.	909.72
68	Rural Bank of San Pascual (Obando, Bulacan), Inc.	899.42
69	Rural Bank of Gattaran (Cagayan), Inc.	883.02
70	Innovative Bank, Inc.	865.61
71	Entrepreneur Rural Bank, Inc.	844.28
72	Network Consolidated Cooperative Bank	841.89
73	Lagawe Highlands Rural Bank, Inc.	841.29
74	Bangko Montanosa, Inc.	840.35
75	Welcome Bank (Rural Bank), Inc.	797.59
76	PlanBank – Rural Bank of Canlubang Planters, Inc.	783.88
77	South Bank, Inc.	772.68
78	Rural Bank of Bambang (Nueva Vizcaya), Inc.	770.45
79	Cooperative Bank of Nueva Vizcaya	766.11
80	Rural Bank of Maria Aurora (Aurora), Inc.	747.39
81	Rural Bank of Tangub City (Misamis Occidental), Inc.	717.20
82	Rural Bank of Pola (Oriental Mindoro), Inc.	707.25
83	Rural Bank of Bagabag (Nueva Vizcaya), Inc.	705.84
84	Laguna Prestige Banking Corporation	699.17
85	Rural Bank of Itogon (Benguet), Inc.	697.75
86	ProFarmers Rural Banking Corporation	695.22
87	BHF Rural Bank, Inc.	693.57
88	Rural Bank of Dumangas, Inc.	687.20
89	Saviour Rural Bank, Inc.	683.68
90	Common Wealth Rural Bank, Inc.	675.30
91	Cooperative Bank of Cebu	652.47
92	Rural Bank of Jaen, Inc.	652.23
93	Rural Bank of San Narciso, Inc.	645.80
94	RNG Bank	633.75
95	Rural Bank of Paracale (Camarines Norte), Inc.	627.91
96	Rural Bank of Cardona (Rizal), Inc.	624.20
97	Binhi Rural Bank, Inc.	609.97
98	Rural Bank of San Antonio, Inc.	604.84
99	Rural Bank of San Luis (Pampanga), Inc.	589.38
100	Aliaga Farmers Rural Bank, Inc.	587.41

== Digital banks ==
=== As of 31 March 2025 ===
Rank	Bank name	Assets (millions of PHP)
1	Maya Bank, Inc.	49,971.51
2	Gotyme Bank Corporation	35,300.19
3	UnionDigital Bank	17,401.52
4	Unobank, Inc.	9,956.86
5	Tonik Digital Bank, Inc.	7,018.92
6	Overseas Filipino Bank Inc A Digital Bank of Landbank	5,138.02

== See also ==
- List of banks in the Philippines
- List of largest banks in Southeast Asia
- Review of top banks in the Philippines
