= List of banks in the Philippines =

The Philippines has a comprehensive banking system encompassing various types of banks, from large universal banks to small rural banks and even non-banks. The banking sector has also experienced rapid digital transformation in the 2020s, with licensed digital banks and mobile-first financial services becoming increasingly significant in the country. As of October 2025, there are 44 universal and commercial banks (22 universal, 22 commercial), and as of June 30, 2025, the rural and cooperative banking sector comprised approximately 374 institutions with total assets of PHP 385.45 billion, all licensed by the Bangko Sentral ng Pilipinas (Central Bank of the Philippines) under the General Banking Act of 2000.

On top of regular banking services offered by universal, commercial, thrift and rural banks, there are savings and loan associations which are mainly based in communities and among retirees in the armed forces and the police organization and other employees of the government of the Philippines. Prominent among these small savings services is the Armed Forces and Police Savings & Loan Association, Inc. (AFPSLAI), which is exclusive to active servicemen and retirees of the armed forces in the Philippines.

== List ==
=== Universal and commercial banks ===
1. ABN Amro Philippines
2. Al-Amanah Islamic Investment Bank of the Philippines*
3. American Express Bank - Manila Branch
4. Asia United Bank Corporation (AUB, a subsidiary of the Rebisco Group of Companies)
5. Australia and New Zealand Banking Group (ANZ)
6. BDO Unibank, Inc. (BDO; largest bank in the Philippines in terms of assets; 243rd largest bank globally, a subsidiary of SM Investments Corporation)
7. BDO Private Bank (a subsidiary of BDO Unibank, Inc.)
8. Prince Bank
9. Bank of America, N.A.
10. Bank of China - Manila Branch
11. Bank of Commerce (a subsidiary of San Miguel Corporation)
12. Bank of the Philippine Islands (BPI; oldest bank in Southeast Asia)
13. Bangkok Bank Co. Ltd.
14. Barclays Bank - Manila Branch
15. Cathay United Bank Co. Ltd. - Manila Branch
16. Chang Hwa Commercial Bank LTD - Manila Branch
17. China Banking Corporation (Chinabank)
18. Chinatrust Philippines Commercial Bank Corporation (Chinatrust)
19. CIMB Bank Philippines Inc.
20. Citibank Philippines
21. Development Bank of the Philippines (DBP, secondary government bank)*
22. Deutsche Bank
23. East West Banking Corporation (EastWest Bank, a subsidiary of Filinvest)
24. First Commercial Bank Manila
25. Hua Nan Commercial Bank Ltd. Manila
26. Industrial Bank of Korea Manila Branch
27. JPMorgan Chase & Co. (JPMorgan Chase)
28. KEB Hana Bank - Manila Branch
29. Land Bank of the Philippines (Landbank; LBP, main government bank)*
30. Maybank Philippines, Inc.
31. Mega International Commercial Bank Co. LTD
32. Metropolitan Bank and Trust Company (Metrobank)
33. Mizuho Bank, Ltd. Manila Branch
34. MUFG Bank, Ltd.
35. Philippine Bank of Communications (PBCom)
36. Philippine National Bank (PNB)
37. Philippine Trust Company (Philtrust Bank)
38. Philippine Veterans Bank (Veterans Bank; PVB)
39. Rizal Commercial Banking Corporation (RCBC)
40. Security Bank Corporation (Security Bank)
41. Shinhan Bank - Manila Branch
42. Sumitomo Mitsui Banking Corporation Manila Branch
43. Union Bank of the Philippines, Inc. (Unionbank)
44. United Overseas Bank Limited Manila Branch
- The forty-five banks listed above are those with the biggest assets in the Philippine banking industry, listed at the BSP website as of September 30, 2022. The largest of these is BDO Unibank and the smallest is Al-Amanah Islamic Bank.

Source: Bangko Sentral ng Pilipinas

=== Savings Banks ===
1. 1st Valley Bank (a development bank)
2. AllBank, Inc.
3. Bank of Makati
4. Bank One Savings Corporation
5. Bangko Kabayan, Inc. (a private development bank)
6. Bataan Development Bank
7. BPI Direct BanKo, Inc. (a subsidiary of BPI)
8. CARD SME Bank, Inc. (a thrift bank)
9. Century Savings Bank Corporation
10. China Bank Savings (formerly PlantersBank - now a subsidiary of Chinabank)
11. City Savings Bank (a subsidiary of Unionbank)
12. Citystate Savings Bank
13. Cordillera Savings Bank, Inc.
14. Dumaguete City Development Bank, Inc.
15. Equicom Savings Bank (Equicom)
16. First Consolidated Bank, Inc.
17. Hiyas Banking Corporation
18. HSBC Savings Bank Philippines Inc.
19. Isla Bank (a thrift bank)
20. Legazpi Savings Bank
21. Lemery Savings and Loan Bank, Inc.
22. Life Savings Bank, Inc.
23. LOLC Bank Philippines, Inc. (a thrift bank)
24. Luzon Development Bank
25. Makiling Development Bank Corporation
26. Malayan Savings Bank
27. NorthPoint Development Bank, Inc.
28. Overseas Filipino Bank (OFBank; a subsidiary of Landbank)
29. Pampanga Development Bank
30. Pen Bank, Inc. (formerly Peninsula RB, Inc.)
31. Philippine Business Bank
32. Philippine Savings Bank (PS Bank; a subsidiary of Metrobank)
33. Philippine Star Development Bank, Inc.
34. Producers Savings Bank Corporation (Producers Bank)
35. Queen City Development Bank
36. Quezon Coconut Bank, Inc. (a thrift bank)
37. Rizal Microbank, Inc. (a thrift bank of RCBC)
38. Sterling Bank of Asia
39. Sun Savings Bank, Inc.
40. UCPB Savings Bank (a subsidiary of UCPB)
41. University Savings Bank, Inc.
42. Woori Bank (Wealth Development Bank Corporation)
43. Yuanta Savings Bank Philippines, Inc.
44. Dungganon Bank, Inc
- These are the forty-four (44) savings and thrift banks in the Philippines as of September 30, 2022, listed in the official website of the Bangko Sentral ng Pilipinas (BSP).

=== Rural and cooperative banks ===
1. AGRIBANK (formed in 2025 from the merger of Agribusiness Rural Bank, Inc., Banco Alabang, Inc., Rural Bank of Maddela (Quirino), Inc., and Rural Bank of San Jacinto (Masbate), Inc.)
2. Aliaga Farmers Rural Bank, Inc.
3. ARDCIBank, Inc. - A Rural Bank
4. ASPAC Rural Bank, Inc.
5. AuroraBank, a microfinance-oriented rural bank
6. Balanga Rural Bank, Inc.
7. Banco Mabuhay (a rural bank)
8. Banco Mexico, Inc. (a rural bank in Mexico, Pampanga since 1962)
9. Banco Santiago de Libon, Inc. "A Rural Bank"
10. Bankways, Inc. (a rural bank)
11. BDO Network Bank (formerly One Network Bank, a subsidiary of BDO Unibank, Inc.)
12. BHF Rural Bank, Inc.
13. BOF, Inc. (a rural bank)
14. Cagsawa Rural Bank, Inc.
15. Camalig Bank, Inc. (a rural bank)
16. Cantilan Bank, Inc. (a rural bank)
17. CARD Bank, Inc. (a microfinance rural bank)
18. Cavite United Rural Bank Corporation (a subsidiary of Asia United Bank Corporation)
19. Cebuana Lhuillier Rural Bank, Inc.
20. Common Wealth Rural Bank, Inc.
21. Community Rural Bank of Catmon (Cebu) Inc.
22. Community Rural Bank of Dapitan City, Inc.
23. Community Rural Bank of San Felipe (Zambales) Inc.
24. Cooperative Bank of Bohol
25. Cooperative Bank of Cotabato
26. Cooperative Bank of Nueva Vizcaya
27. Cooperative Bank of Quezon Province
28. Consolidated Cooperative Bank
29. Country Builders Bank, Inc. (a rural bank) (a consolidation of Country Rural Bank of Taguig Inc. and Builders Rural Bank Inc.—in 2012) is rebranded in May, 2024, as Top Bank Philippines Inc.
30. D' Asian Hills Bank, Inc. (a rural bank)
31. Dumaguete Rural Bank, Inc. (DRBI)
32. EastWest Rural Bank, Inc. (EWRB; a subsidiary of EastWest Bank)
33. Entrepreneur Rural Bank, Inc.
34. First Agro-Industrial Rural Bank, Inc. / FAIRBANK Inc.
35. First Isabela Cooperative Bank (FICO Bank)
36. First Tagum Rural Bank, Inc.
37. GM Bank of Luzon, Inc. (a rural bank)
38. Guagua Rural Bank, Inc.
39. Highland Rural Bank, Inc.
40. Ilocos Consolidated Cooperative Bank (formerly Ilocos Sur Cooperative Bank and Cooperative Bank of Ilocos Norte)
41. Imus Rural Bank, Inc.
42. Innovative Bank, Inc. (a rural bank)
43. Insular Savers Bank, Inc. (a rural bank)
44. Katipunan Banking Corporation (a rural bank)
45. Laguna Prestige Banking Corporation (a rural bank)
46. Liberty Bank (a rural bank)
47. LifeBank (a rural bank)
48. Mactan Rural Bank (Lapu-Lapu City) Inc.
49. Malarayat Rural Bank, Inc.
50. Mallig Plains Rural Bank (ISA) Inc.
51. Marayo Bank, Inc. (a rural bank)
52. MariBank Philippines, Inc. (a rural bank since 1965, formerly SeaBank Philippines)
53. Metro South Cooperative Bank
54. Mount Makiling Rural Bank, Inc.
55. MVSM Bank (a rural bank since 1953) Inc.
56. Network Consolidated Cooperative Bank
57. New Rural Bank of San Leonardo (N.E.) Inc.
58. Opportunity Kauswagan Inc. (a microfinance rural bank)
59. Own Bank, The Rural Bank of Cavite City
60. People’s Rural Bank (Gen. Santos City) Inc.
61. PlanBank (Rural Bank of Canlubang Planters, Inc.)
62. Quezon Capital Rural Bank, Inc.
63. Rang-ay Bank, Inc. (a rural bank)
64. RBG Imperial Bank, Inc. (a rural bank)
65. RBT Bank, Inc. (a rural bank)
66. Rizal Bank (a microfinance rural bank)
67. Rural Bank of Angeles, Inc. (a subsidiary of Asia United Bank)
68. Rural Bank of Bagabag (N.V.) Inc.
69. Rural Bank of Bambang (Nueva Vizcaya) Inc.
70. Rural Bank of Barili (Cebu) Inc.
71. Rural Bank of Bauang, Inc.
72. Rural Bank of Bayombong, Inc.
73. Rural Bank of Calbayog City, Inc.
74. Rural Bank of Cardona (Rizal) Inc.
75. Rural Bank of Cauayan, Inc.
76. Rural Bank of Central Pangasinan (Bayambang) Inc.
77. Rural Bank of Cuenca Inc.
78. Rural Bank of Digos, Inc.
79. Rural Bank of Dolores (Quezon) Inc.
80. Rural Bank of Dumangas, Inc.
81. Rural Bank of Gattaran (Cagayan) Inc.
82. Rural Bank of General Trias, Inc.
83. Rural Bank of Guinobatan, Inc.
84. Rural Bank of Itogon (Benguet) Inc.
85. Rural Bank of Jaen, Inc.
86. Rural Bank of Lebak (Sultan Kudarat) Inc.
87. Rural Bank of Mabalacat, Inc.
88. Rural Bank of Magdalena (Laguna) Inc.
89. Rural Bank of Mangaldan
90. Rural Bank of Maragondon, Inc.
91. Rural Bank of Maria Aurora (Aurora) Inc.
92. Rural Bank of Mexico (Pampanga since 1962)
93. Rural Bank of Montalban, Inc.
94. Rural Bank of Pandi (Bulacan) Inc.
95. Rural Bank of Paracale (Camarines Norte) Inc.
96. Rural Bank of Pilar (Bataan) Inc.
97. Rural Bank of Pilar (Sor) Inc.
98. Rural Bank of Pola (Oriental Mindoro)
99. Rural Bank of Rizal (Zamboanga del Norte) Inc.
100. Rural Bank of Rosario (La Union) Inc.
101. Rural Bank of San Antonio, Inc.
102. Rural Bank of San Mateo (Isabela) Inc.
103. Rural Bank of San Narciso, Inc.
104. Rural Bank of San Pascual (Obando, Bulacan) Inc.
105. Rural Bank of Solano (Nueva Vizcaya) Inc.
106. Rural Bank of Sta. Ignacia, Inc.
107. Rural Bank of Tandag (Surigao Del Sur) Inc.
108. Rural Bank of Tangub City (Misamis Occidental) Inc.
109. Rural Bank of Taal, Inc
110. Salmon Bank, Inc.
111. Saviour Rural Bank, Inc.
112. Sta. Maria Rural Bank, Inc.
113. Sugbuanon Rural Bank, Inc.
114. Summit Bank (rural bank of Tublay, Inc.)
115. Valiant Bank, Inc. (a rural bank)
116. Zamboanga del Norte Cooperative Bank
- The rural and cooperative banks listed above are the updated list from the official website of the Bangko Sentral ng Pilipinas (BSP) as of September 30, 2022. The largest rural bank in the Philippines in terms of assets is BDO Network Bank.

=== Digital banks ===
1. Maya
2. UnionDigital Bank
3. GoTyme Bank
4. Maribank
5. Tonik
6. UNO Digital Bank
7. OFBank

=== Defunct or merged banks ===
- 1st E Bank (Philippine Branches acquired by Banco de Oro)
- Acme Savings Bank (acquired by the Sy Group of Companies and renamed Banco De Oro)
- AIG Philam Savings Bank (merged with East West Banking Corporation)
- Allied Bank (merged with Philippine National Bank)
- AMA Rural Bank of Mandaluyong, Inc.
- Banco Dipolog (acquired by Producers Savings Bank Corporation)
- Banco Filipino
- Banco Santander Central Hispano (Philippine subsidiary acquired by Banco De Oro and renamed BDO Private Bank)
- Bank of Cebu
- Bank Saderat Iran (Philippine branches merged with Banco de Oro)
- BNP Paribas (acquired by RCBC)
- Capitol Development Bank (acquired by RCBC and became RCBC Savings Bank - merged with RCBC)
- ComSavings Bank
- Cooperative Bank of Aurora
- Credito Italiano (acquired by Banco de Oro)
- Dao Heng Bank (acquired by Banco de Oro)
- Ecology Bank (merged with Equitable PCI Bank)
- Equitable Bank (merged with PCI Bank forming Equitable PCI Bank and now merged with Banco de Oro)
- Export and Industry Bank
- Family Savings Bank (acquired by BPI; renamed to BPI Family Savings Bank)
- Far East Bank And Trust Company (acquired by Bank of the Philippine Islands)
- GE Money Bank (acquired by Banco de Oro)
- Green Bank of Caraga (acquired by EastWest Banking Corporation alongside FinMan Rural Bank, Inc. in 2013 and became EastWest Rural Bank, Inc.)
- Industrial and Commercial Bank of China Limited (renamed BDO Elite Savings Bank)
- Insular Bank of Asia and America (merged with Philippine Commercial International Bank)
- International Exchange Bank (acquired by and merged with Union Bank of the Philippines)
- Keppel Bank (acquired by GE Capital Finance)
- Manila Bank (first incarnation shut down by BSP in 1987; second incarnation merged with Chinabank)
- Mindanao Development Bank (merged with Equitable PCI Bank)
- Orient Commercial Banking Corporation (forced to close; Allied Bank took over 52 branches)
- Philippine Commercial International Bank (merged with Equitable Bank forming Equitable PCI Bank and now merged with Banco De Oro)
- Philippine Postal Savings Bank (PostBank; acquired by Landbank in 2018 and became Overseas Filipino Bank)
- Philippine Resources Savings Bank (PR Savings Bank; acquired by CitySavings Bank in 2018)
- Planters Development Bank (merged with Chinabank Savings)
- Rabobank (forced to closed and merged with Union Bank)
- Robinsons Bank (merged with BPI)
- Société Générale (Philippine operations acquired by Union Bank)
- Standard Chartered Bank Philippines (Philippine retail banking business was acquired by East West Banking Corporation in 2016)
- The Hongkong and Shanghai Banking Corporation Limited
- Traders Royal Bank (now emerged with Bank of Commerce)
- United Coconut Planters Bank (merged with Landbank)
- Urban Bank (forced to close then merged with Export and Industry Bank)
