= Digital banks in the Philippines =

Digital banks in the Philippines are a new formal category of banks which were only approved by the Bangko Sentral ng Pilipinas (BSP), the country's central bank, in 2020. The first such banks launched in the Philippines were Tonik, Overseas Filipino Bank, and UnionDigital of UnionBank of the Philippines. Several more banks were approved by the BSP before 2021, when it announced that it would stop approving the establishment of further digital banks for three years, in order to strengthen the industry and assure healthy competition among its players. The BSP later allowed for new digital bank entrants starting 2025.

== Background ==
Digital banking and financial technology have been one of the most rapidly growing industries in Asia, seeing large success in countries such as South Korea, China, and Japan. In Southeast Asia, Singapore is at the top of the digital banking industry, with the Philippines only recently following suit when the need for digital transactions rose during the COVID-19 pandemic in 2020. A report by the BSP in 2019 claimed that 70% of Filipinos remained unbanked. A decline in check and ATM transactions, as well as a rise in digital transactions, was also reported in 2020 by the BSP.

Recognizing the necessity to digitalize, the BSP issued Circular No. 1105 on "The Guidelines on the Establishment of Digital Banks" in 2020, allowing digital banks to apply for their formal licenses. The BSP aims to digitalize 50 percent of transactions and encourage at least 70 percent of Filipinos to open their own financial accounts by year 2023.

The BSP has also announced that it has capped the number of licensed digital banks that will operate in the country to six (6), instead of seven originally planned. It has stopped accepting applications for the digital banking license for three years in order to preserve the competition among the new banks.

The BSP announced that starting January 1, 2025, it would reopen the application window for digital banks, with four new slots available, expanding the number of licensed digital banks to a maximum of ten (10).

As of July 22, 2026, there are seven licensed digital banks in the Philippines.

== List of largest digital banks in the Philippines ==
=== 2025 ===
Rank	Bank name	Assets (millions of PHP)
1	Maya Bank, Inc.	77,662.74
2	MariBank Philippines, Inc.	68,198.71
3	Gotyme Bank Corporation	50,111.39
4	Unobank, Inc.	11,941.39
5	UnionDigital Bank	11,834.79
6	Tonik Digital Bank, Inc.	8,248.43
7	Overseas Filipino Bank Inc A Digital Bank of Landbank	5,553.4

=== 2024 ===
Rank	Bank name	Assets (millions of PHP)
1	Maya Bank, Inc.	45,321.32
2	MariBank Philippines, Inc.	38,560.86
3	Gotyme Bank Corporation	29,848.91
4	UnionDigital Bank	19,446.25
5	Unobank, Inc.	10,337.42
6	Tonik Digital Bank, Inc.	7,720.57
7	Overseas Filipino Bank Inc A Digital Bank of Landbank	4,983.58

=== 2023 ===
Rank	Bank name	Assets (millions of PHP)
1	Maya Bank, Inc.	28,080.81
2	UnionDigital Bank	22,472.87
3	MariBank Philippines, Inc.	18,592.63
4	Gotyme Bank Corporation	16,803.12
5	Tonik Digital Bank, Inc.	9,742.99
6	Unobank, Inc.	6,828.63
7	Overseas Filipino Bank Inc A Digital Bank of Landbank	4,761.72

== Banks that offer similar digital and online banking services ==
The following banks are not licensed by the BSP to operate as digital banks but are offering digital banking and/or online banking services:

- CIMB Bank - a Malaysia-based universal bank that has 1,080 branches throughout Southeast Asia. It has various entities in the region, including CIMB Bank Philippines. CIMB Bank Philippines was established in December 2018 and officially launched in 2019 as an all-digital banking presence. Its mobile app is called OCTO and users are able to open their accounts and manage transactions through the platform. CIMB was awarded the Best Digital Bank 2021 by the Global Banking and Finance Review.
- DiskarTech - Rizal Commercial Banking Corporation (RCBC)'s digital bank and app whose key features include its languages being a mix of English and Tagalog, addressing the bilingual needs of Filipino users. The app was launched in July 2020 and aims to target unbanked Filipinos. DiskarTech is also the first digital bank to offer a Visayan interface, extending its goal of financial inclusivity to the local mass markets. The app has no required maintaining balance and users can download the app to open an account.
- Komo by EastWest - EastWest’s fully digital banking service that was launched in May 2020, during the height of the COVID-19 lockdown in the Philippines. EastWest officials mentioned that Komo combines the convenience of modern digital banking that is backed by the security of an established “brick-and-mortar” bank.
- NetBank - formerly Community Rural Bank of Romblon (Romblon).
- OwnBank - known as Rural Bank of Cavite City.
- Salmon - formerly Rural Bank of Sta. Rosa (Laguna).

== See also ==
- Economy of the Philippines
- Bangko Sentral ng Pilipinas
