= Insular Life =

Mutual life insurance company in the Philippines

The Insular Life Assurance Company, Ltd.
- Type: Mutual, limited liability
- Industry: Life insurance
- Founded: Manila, Philippine Islands (November 25, 1910; 115 years ago)
- Founder: Antonio Ma. Barretto (Founding President)
- Headquarters: Insular Life Corporate Centre, Alabang, Muntinlupa, Philippines
- Key people: Nina Aguas (Chairman); Raoul Antonio Littaua (President and CEO)
- Services: Life insurance, health insurance, investment fund, health care, bancassurance
- Revenue: ▼ ₱18.2 billion
- Net income: ▼ ₱3.14 billion (2020)
- Total assets: ▲ ₱148.7 billion (2020)
- Total equity: ▼ ₱37.1 billion (2020)
- Owner: Policy holders
- Number of employees: 336 (2019)
- Subsidiaries: Insular Health Care, Inc. (100%); Insular Investment Corporation (100%); Insular Life Management and Development Corporation (100%); Union Bank of the Philippines (13.72%); MAFPRE Insular Insurance Corporation (25%); PPI Prime Venture, Inc.(30%)
- Website: www.insularlife.com.ph

The Insular Life Assurance Company, Ltd., commonly known by its trade name, Insular Life, and abbreviated as InLife, is a mutual life insurance company in the Philippines. Established on November 25, 1910, in Manila, it was the first Filipino life insurance company. The company offers individual and group life, health, education, and retirement insurance plans. It also provides related financial services, including general insurance, banking, healthcare, lending, and investment services, through subsidiaries and affiliated companies within its eponymous corporate group. Insular Life was a member of the Ayala Corporation until 1987, when it became a mutual company owned by its policyholders. Its executive chairperson is Nina D. Aguas, and its chief executive officer is Raoul Antonio E. Littaua. In 2020, it ranked tenth among life insurers in the Philippines in terms of premium income and fourth in terms of net worth.

== History ==
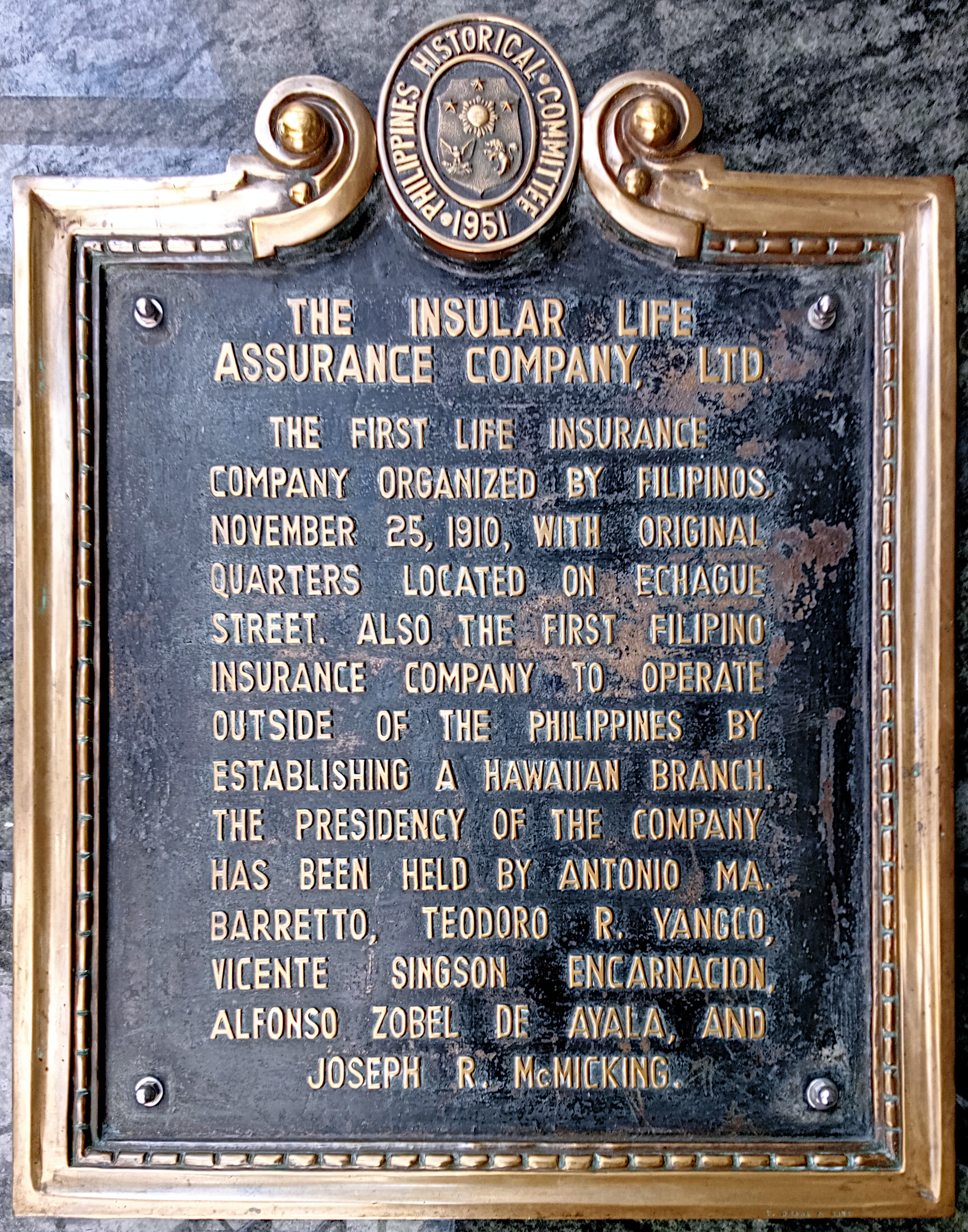
1951 historical marker installed at Insular Life's original headquarters in Makati

The firm was established as the first domestic life insurance company in the Philippines with Antonio Ma. Barretto as its founding President. Its first headquarters were located at the Lack and Davies Building in Manila's Echague district. In 1934, it inaugurated its first building in Binondo, Manila. Insular Life established an overseas branch in Honolulu in 1934, and its first district office in Cebu City in 1938. During the Second World War, the company continued operations and took over the business of the Filipinas Life Assurance Company. The Philippines business of the Occidental Life Insurance Company of California was acquired by the company in 1954. A few years later in 1958, it introduced industrial life insurance in the Philippines.

InLife agreed to acquire 100% of shares in Assicurazioni Generali's Philippine subsidiary on December 2024. It finalized this acquisition on May 2025 after receiving approval from regulators, and appointed a new president and chief executive officer for their new subsidiary, and rebranded the subsidiary InLife Benefits on January 2026.

== Office buildings ==
The former headquarters of Insular Life in Makati

=== Muntinlupa ===
It is currently headquartered at the Insular Life Corporate Centre (ILCC) building in Filinvest City, Alabang, Muntinlupa. Designed by the Japanese firm, Takenobu Mohri Architects and Associates, the ILCC was inaugurated in 2001. The building is a two-tower structure connected by a podium, which houses a 500-seat auditorium.

=== Makati ===
Previously, it held its main corporate offices at the Insular Life Building in Makati. That building was built in 1962 and was the first to surpass the 30-meter height restriction in the Philippines. It had a gently curving façade entirely covered by narrow vertical aluminium projections that were set close together within square modules to conceal the curtain wall behind it. Originally designed by Cesar Concio, the building was controversially redeveloped in 2005 with a design by Takenobu Mohri Architects and Associates, and again in 2015 by Casas Architects.

=== Cebu City ===
It also maintains a corporate building at the Cebu Business Park designed by Jose Mañosa.

== Corporate group ==
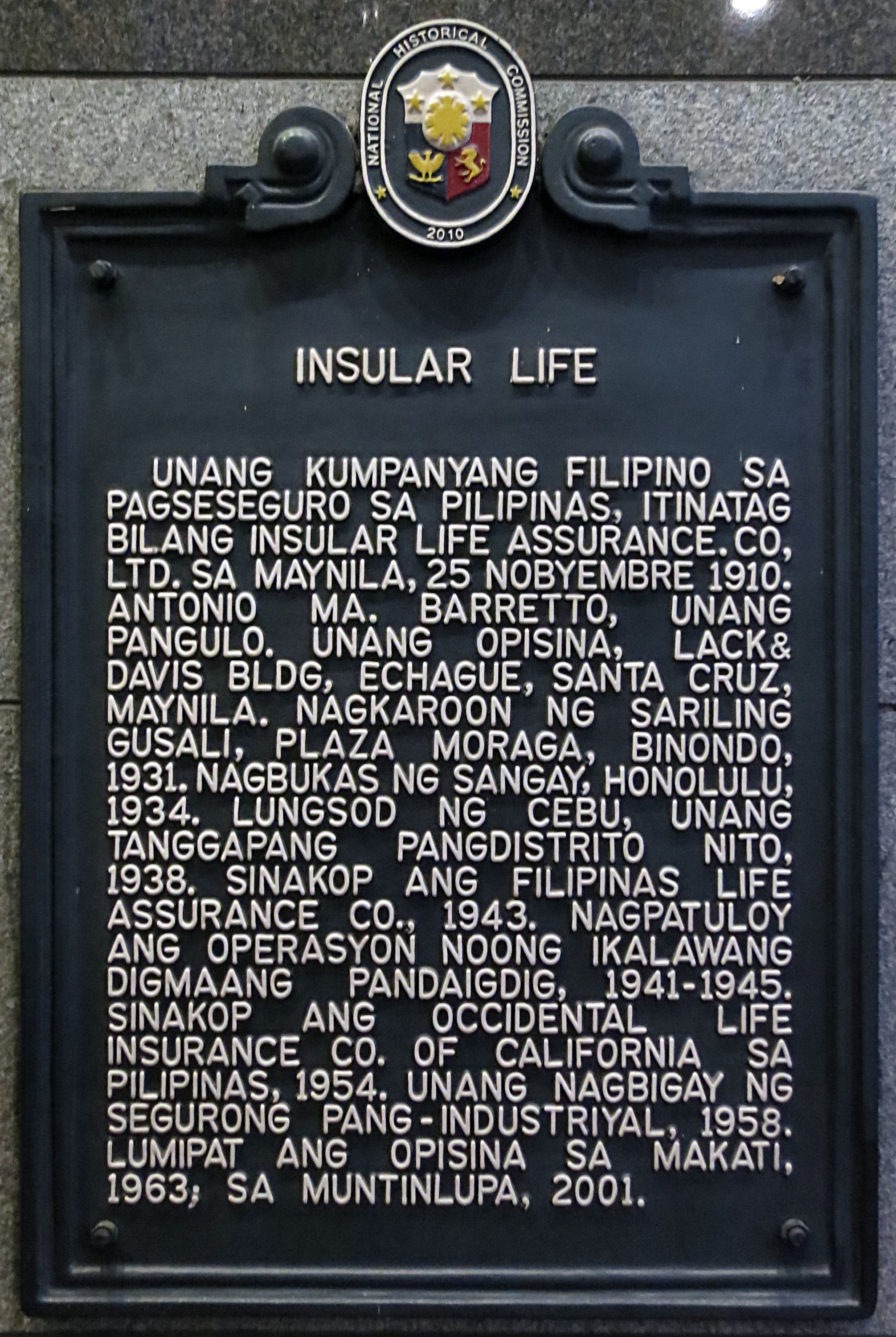
Historical Marker in the corporate headquarters.

The members of the Insular group of companies as of 2025 are:

Holding company

- The Insular Life Assurance Company, Ltd. (Life Insurance underwriting)

Subsidiaries

- InLife Benefits Insurance Company, Inc. (Group insurance, acquired in 2025, formerly Generali Philippines)
- Insular Investment Corporation (Investment banking)
- Insular Life Management and Development Corporation (Management services)
  - ILAC General Insurance Agency (General agency)

Affiliates

- Maria Health (Health/HMO marketing)
- PPI Prime Venture (Real estate)
- Union Bank of the Philippines (Universal banking and Bancassurance partner)

Social commitment

- Insular Foundation

Former subsidiaries and affiliates

- Insular Health Care, Inc. (Health/HMO, until 2025, sold to Value-Based Health Care of Singapore)
- Mapfre Insular Insurance (Non-life Insurance underwriting, until 2023, sold to Oona Insurance)
- Hawaiian Life Insurance Company (Until 1955, acquired by the American General Life Insurance Company)
- Insular Savings Bank (Until 2005, acquired by Citibank Philippines)
- HomeCredit Mutual Building and Loan Association
