= CitySavings =

Thrift bank subsidiary of UnionBank

City Savings Bank
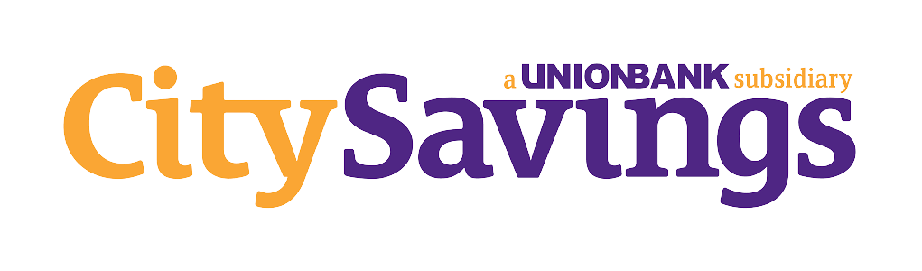
- Formerly: Cebu City Savings and Loan Association
- Company type: Subsidiary
- Industry: Finance and Thrift Banking Industry
- Founded: 1965; 61 years ago
- Headquarters: UnionBank Plaza, Meralco Avenue corner Sapphire and Onyx Streets, Ortigas Center, Pasig, Metro Manila, Philippines
- Area served: Philippines
- Key people: Ana Maria Aboitiz Delgado (chairwoman); Lorenzo "Larry" T. Ocampo (vice chairman); Manuel Santiago Jr. (president and CEO)
- Products: Digital banking, Loans, Pensions, OFW, Savings Accounts, Checking Accounts
- Total assets: P76.795 Billion PHP ▲ (2019)
- Number of employees: 1,845 (2020)
- Parent: UnionBank of the Philippines
- Website: www.citysavings.com.ph

City Savings Bank, commonly known as CitySavings, is a thrift bank subsidiary of Union Bank of the Philippines and established in 1965, founded in Cebu City and also member of the Aboitiz Group of Companies. City Savings is regulated by the Bangko Sentral ng Pilipinas. Its corporate office is located at the UnionBank Plaza, Meralco Avenue corner Sapphire and Onyx Streets, Ortigas Center, Pasig, Metro Manila.

== History ==
CitySavings was incorporated by Don Ramon Aboitiz and Teotimo Abellana in 1965 at Cebu City, Philippines as Cebu City Savings and Loan Association (CCSLA). After 11 years, the bank expanded to the nearby city of Tagbilaran, Bohol. In 2013, City Savings was acquired by UnionBank and became its subsidiary. They then expanded their network in Cagayan Valley and opened a branch in Tuguegarao, Cagayan.

In June 2018, UnionBank's subsidiary City Savings Bank acquired Philippine Resources Savings Bank (PR Savings) from the ROPALI Group, with City Savings Bank as the surviving entity of the said merger. The merger officially closed in March 2019, All PR Savings Bank branches completed integration into the City Savings Bank network, increasing the bank's number of branches to 217, As a result, City Savings Bank became the 4th largest thrift bank in the Philippines in terms of assets. and soon will be the 3rd largest Thrift Bank after BPI Family Savings Bank will be merged with BPI in early-2022.

In January 2021, City Savings Bank acquired 70% majority stake of Batangas-based thrift bank Bangko Kabayan, making Bangko Kabayan became an affiliate of City Savings Bank.

== Ownerships ==
- Bangko Kabayan
- PR Savings Bank
- Petnet

== Partners ==
- Lalamove
- Department of Education (Philippines)

== See also ==
- Unionbank (Philippines)
- List of banks in the Philippines
- BancNet
- List of largest banks in the Philippines
- Aboitiz Equity Ventures

== Gallery ==
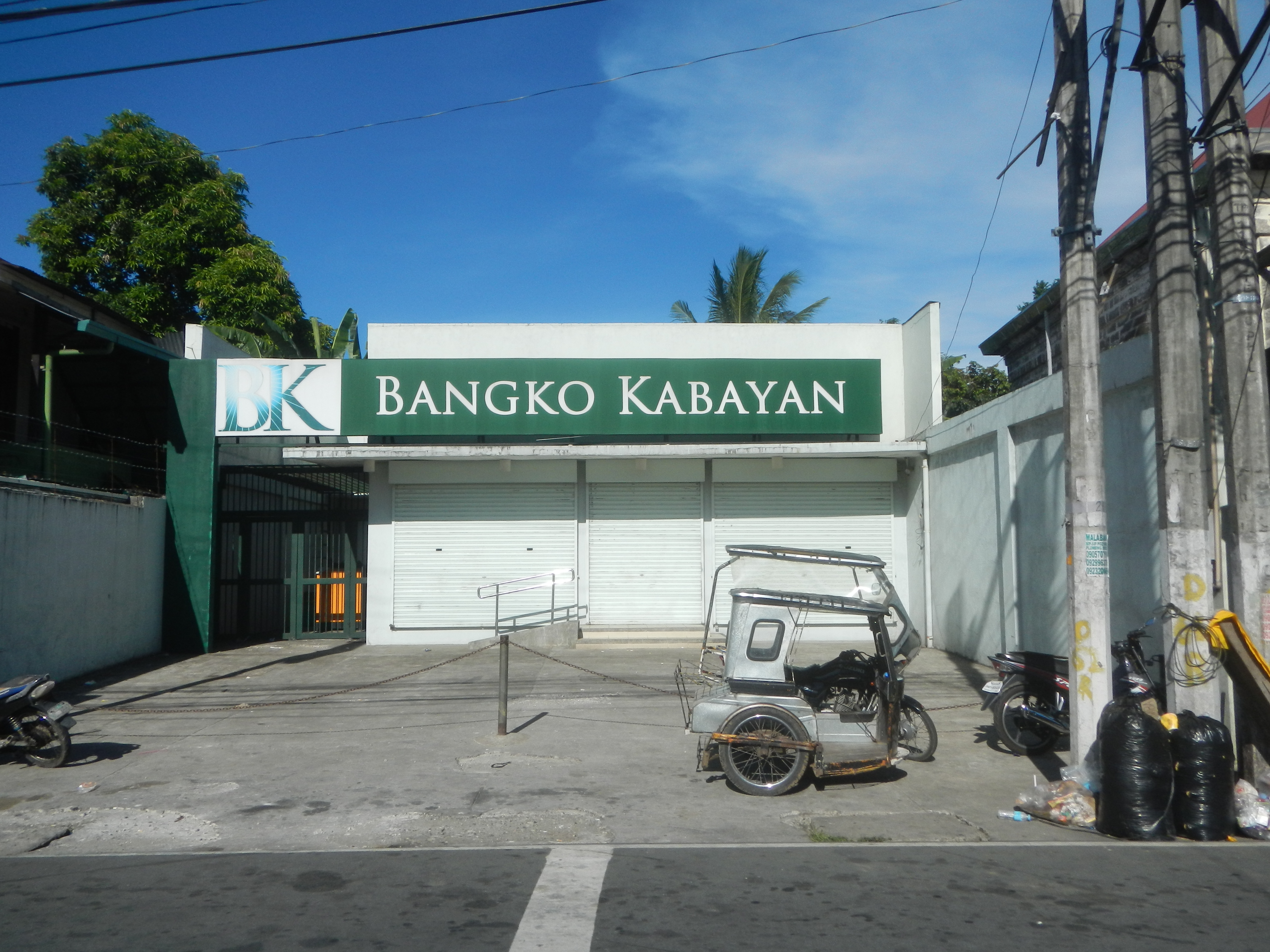
Bangko Kabayan (Pagsanjan, Laguna)

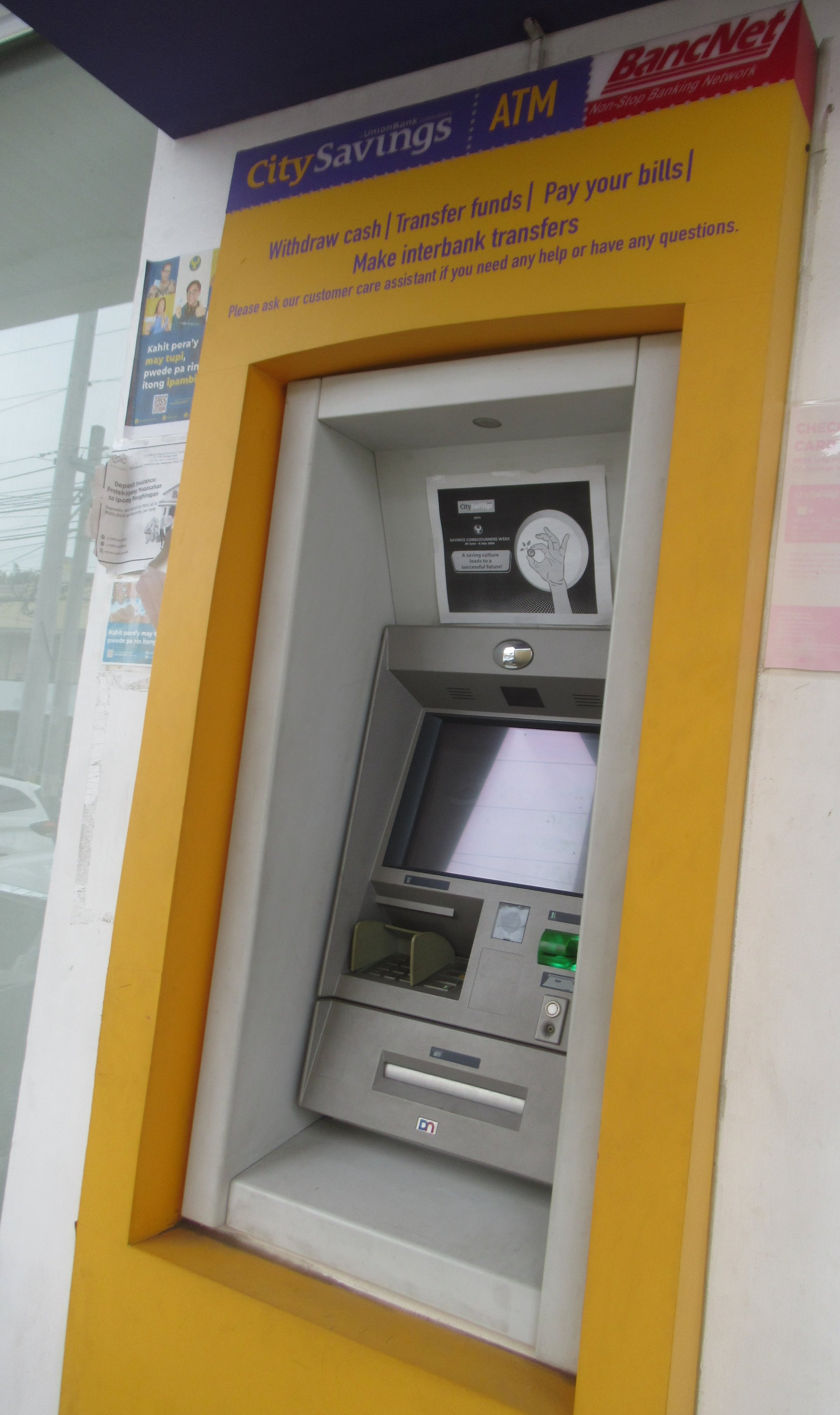
City Savings Bank ATM
