= International Exchange Bank =

- Company type: Defunct; now part of Union Bank of the Philippines
- Industry: Finance and Insurance
- Founded: Manila, Philippines (August 17, 1995; 30 years ago)
- Defunct: 2007; 19 years ago
- Fate: Merged into Union Bank of the Philippines in 2007 and assumed the UnionBank name
- Successor: Union Bank of the Philippines
- Headquarters: Makati, Philippines
- Key people: Ramon Y. Sy, President and CEO
- Products: Financial services
- Net income: P755 million PHP (▲44%) (2005)
- Number of employees: 1,400
- Website: www.ibank.com.ph

International Exchange Bank, more commonly known as iBank, was one of the largest banks in the Philippines, ranking within the top twenty in terms of assets. It was acquired by the larger Union Bank of the Philippines in mid-2006. Integration of the iBank brand into the UnionBank brand was completed in mid-2008.

== History ==
iBank was founded as a commercial bank on August 17, 1995, starting operations on September 25 of that year. It grew rapidly largely due to its consumer-oriented services which proved to be popular at the time. It was one of the many banks formed during the 1990s, when the administration of Fidel V. Ramos and Bangko Sentral ng Pilipinas governor Gabriel Singson encouraged the formation of more banks, a policy since reversed today.

On September 22, 2003, iBank joined MegaLink and unveiled its iDeal ATM card. At the time of its launch, the iDeal card was revolutionary in the sense that it was the first ATM card to come with value-added benefits, such as shopping discounts.

The bank listed on the Philippine Stock Exchange on December 6, 2004, under the ticker symbol IBNK.

iBank was acquired by Union Bank of the Philippines on June 5, 2006 that saw 98.86% of all iBank shares being sold in a block sale, catapulting UnionBank to become the seventh-largest bank in the Philippines in terms of assets.

In a well-attended event, employees and stockholders gathered on September 25, 2010 to commemorate the bank's 15th anniversary at the Makati Sports Club. The reunion is unprecedented in the banking industry in the country, where close to 600 employees organized to hold a program that rivals any other gathering by any existing bank as of September 2010; considering that the company was consolidated four years ago.

== Ownership ==
- Union Bank of the Philippines: 98.86%
- Others (includes public stock): 1.14%

== See also ==
- List of banks in the Philippines
- MegaLink
- Union Bank of the Philippines
