= Marayo Bank =

Bank in the Philippines

Marayo Bank, Inc. (A Rural Bank)
- Type: Private
- Industry: Banking and finance
- Founded: November 18, 1969 in Pontevedra, Negros Occidental, Philippines
- Headquarters: Pontevedra, Negros Occidental, Philippines
- Key people: Franklin Fuentebella (Chairman); Mary Grace F. Escario (President and GM)
- Services: Financial services
- Website: marayobank.com.ph

Marayo Bank, Inc. (A Rural Bank) is a bank in the Philippines founded in 1969 as Rural Bank of Marayo (Neg. Occ.), Inc. Rural banks, a type of bank created by the Rural Banks' Act of 1952, are private banks mandated to lend primarily to farmers and small merchants, on reasonable terms, in order to expand the rural economy.

The bank won Land Bank's award for Most Outstanding Countryside Financial Institution for calendar year 2008, beating 388 other banks nationwide. It has won regional awards repeatedly since 2001.

== History ==
Rural Bank of Marayo (Neg. Occ.), Inc. opened its headquarters branch on 18 November 1969, in Pontevedra, a town on the west coast of the province of Negros Occidental. It remains the only bank in the town.

In 2005 it opened a second branch, in Enrique B. (EB) Magalona, a coastal town about 65 kilometres (40 mi) north of Pontevedra. It opened a third branch in 2006, in Banate, a town in the province of Iloilo on the coast of Panay, across the Guimaras Strait from EB Magalona. It is the only bank in Banate.

In 2013 the bank changed its name to Marayo Bank, Inc. (A Rural Bank).

== Branches ==
In addition to branches in Pontevedra, EB Magalona, and Banate, Marayo Bank has extension offices in Passi City, Bacolod, Binalbagan, Cadiz, and Kabankalan. Extension offices are publicly accessible banking offices that perform some of the functions of branches, but are deemed by regulating authorities for various reasons to be remote extensions of existing branches rather than branches themselves.

== Services ==
The bank offers deposit accounts (checking, savings and time deposit), loans (agricultural, commercial, salary, pension, and mortgage), and, via Western Union, money transfers for overseas remittance.

== Structure ==
Franklin G. Fuentebella chairs the seven-member board of directors. President and General Manager Mary Grace F. Escario, supervises the bank's daily operations.

== Awards ==
Land Bank is a government owned bank with a social mandate of promoting rural development. One way it fulfils its mission is through Countryside Financial Institution (CFI) partners, a network of hundreds of rural banks, cooperative banks, and thrifts. Land Bank makes wholesale loans to the CFIs, which act as conduits, in turn lending the funds to farmers, fisherfolk, and small businesses.

Every year, in recognition of their active role in developing the countryside economy, Land Bank recognizes its most outstanding CFI partners with awards for serving "as models of excellence in rural financial services." Marayo Bank was awarded Most Outstanding Rural Bank in Region VI seven times, for calendar years 2001–04 and 2006–08. It was awarded Most Outstanding Rural Bank in the Philippines for calendar year 2008, beating out 388 other CFIs for the honor. For calendar years 2009 and 2010 it won the Most Outstanding Rural Bank - Hall of Fame Award.
