= Bank of Cebu =

The Bank of Cebu was a privately owned savings bank based in Cebu City in the Philippines that became bankrupt in 2006.

== History ==
Bank of Cebu was one of the largest banks based in Cebu province, and it started operations in 1961. In 1990, after several years of lending to trading and commercial businesses in Cebu City, the bank began shifting its lending portfolio in favor of small and medium enterprises involved in manufacturing, taking advantage of the city's industrialization. On August 31, 2006, the Bank of Cebu declared bankruptcy and was subsequently declared insolvent, the first time a bank in the Philippines failed since the failure of Urban Bank in 2000. The bank was placed under the receivership of the Bangko Sentral ng Pilipinas, and at the time of its closure, it had some 8,000 depositors split among seven branches located in Metro Cebu.

The closure of Bank of Cebu was considered controversial, with bank owners requesting the Cebu City Court of Appeals for a temporary restraining order to prevent the bank's closure. However, this was denied by the court, and subsequently by the Court of Appeals. Despite the failure, 98% of the bank's depositors were able to retrieve the entirety of their deposits as they were covered by the Philippine Deposit Insurance Corporation.

== See also ==
- List of banks in the Philippines
