= Roberto de Ocampo =

Roberto de Ocampo, OBE, is a Founding Partner of the Centennial Group International, and Chairman of Centennial Asia Advisors. He was the president of the Asian Institute of Management. He was chairman and CEO of the Development Bank of the Philippines in 1989. From 1992 to 98, he served as Secretary of Finance under President Fidel V. Ramos. Thereafter, he was named Finance Minister of the Year by several organizations from 1995, 1996, and 1997.

He is currently the Chairman of Philippine Veterans Bank.

== Family and education ==
De Ocampo graduated from De La Salle University (1962) and the Ateneo de Manila University (1967) where he received his Bachelor of Arts degree in Economics (cum laude). He has a Master in Business Administration from the University of Michigan (1970) and a post-graduate diploma from the London School of Economics (1971).

He is married with four children.

== Public service ==
De Ocampo began his career in public service in 1972. He pioneered the rural electrification program. He was then recognized as the youngest administrator in the history of the national government and received the Ten Outstanding Young Men of the Philippines (TOYM) award in 1975.

After working as a senior loan officer at the World Bank, he was appointed chairman and CEO of the Development Bank of the Philippines (DBP) in 1989. Under his leadership, the DBP won national and international recognition and was named "the world's second soundest bank" by The Banker magazine. For his groundbreaking initiatives in the field of development banking, he was presented with the very first "Man of the Year Award" by the Association of Development Finance Institutions in the Asia-Pacific (ADFIAF) in 1997.

As Secretary of Finance, de Ocampo introduced and implemented a number of important policies and measures, particularly in the areas of economic liberalization, privatization and tax reform. This resulted in the Philippines’ return to international capital markets after a decade-long absence, the first fiscal surplus in twenty years, and an unprecedented and sustained combination of healthy economic growth, low interest rates and single-digit inflation. The liberalization of the banking and insurance industries opened up these sectors to foreign investment and marked the exit of the Philippines from a nearly continuous thirty years of IMF economic rehabilitation and reform programs.

== Awards ==
By 1995, these accomplishments were hailed by the international finance community. In 1995, he was named "Finance Minister of the Year" by Euromoney Magazine—the first Filipino and second ASEAN finance minister to be so recognized. In 1997, he was again cited as "Asian Finance Minister of the Year", this time by the Asiamoney magazine. In September 2001, he was named to the Ordre National de la Legion d' Honneur by the Republic of France with the rank of Chevalier for his successful efforts and initiatives to promote closer Philippine-France relations. On the Queen's Diamond Jubilee, Roberto de Ocampo received from Queen Elizabeth II the Order of the British Empire (OBE) for his contribution to the development of UK-Philippines relations for over four decades. De Ocampo, now recognized as an Honorary Officer of the Most Excellent Order of the British Empire. He has also been awarded the Philippine Legion of Honor, the highest honor conferred on Filipino civilians by the Republic of the Philippines in 1998 for his outstanding contributions to the country.
