= Euromoney Finance Minister of the Year =

Former award by magazine Euromoney

Between 1981-2016, Euromoney magazine awarded the Finance Minister of the Year award. This award was given to a country Finance Minister who reformed or innovated their countries economy during their tenure. In Australia, the award is colloquially nicknamed "World's Greatest Treasurer" after Paul Keating won in 1984. The award has not been given since 2017, with the magazine focusing their articles and awards on Banking Excellence.

Past recipients are listed below.

- 1981 Turgut Özal of Turkey
- 1982 Hon Sui Sen of Singapore
- 1983 Jesús Silva Herzog of Mexico
- 1984 Paul Keating of Australia
- 1985 Roger Douglas of New Zealand
- 1986 James Baker of the United States of America
- 1987 Edouard Balladur of France
- 1988 Nigel Lawson of the United Kingdom
- 1989 J. B. Sumarlin of Indonesia
- 1990 Philippe Maystadt of Belgium
- 1991 Carlos Solchaga of Spain
- 1992 Domingo Cavallo of Argentina
- 1993 Manmohan Singh of India
- 1994 Iiro Viinanen of Finland
- 1995 Roberto de Ocampo of the Philippines
- 1996 Robert Rubin of the United States of America
- 1997 Anatoly Chubais of Russia
- 1998 Leszek Balcerowicz of Poland
- 1999 José Ángel Gurría of Mexico
- 2000 Brigita Schmögnerová of Slovakia
- 2001 Shaukat Aziz of Pakistan
- 2002 Milen Veltchev of Bulgaria
- 2003 Ibrahim bin Abdulaziz Al-Assaf of Saudi Arabia
- 2004 Ivan Miklos of Slovakia
- 2005 Ngozi Okonjo-Iweala of Nigeria
- 2006 Sri Mulyani Indrawati of Indonesia
- 2007 Mlađan Dinkić of Serbia
- 2008 Xie Xuren of China
- 2009 Jim Flaherty of Canada
- 2010 Alexei Kudrin of Russia
- 2011 Wayne Swan of Australia
- 2012 Cesar Purisima of Philippines
- 2013 Tharman Shanmugaratnam of Singapore
- 2014 Luis Videgaray Caso of Mexico
- 2015 Mauricio Cárdenas Santamaría of Colombia
- 2016 Alfonso Prat-Gay of Argentina
