= Philippine Veterans Bank =

Bank in the Philippines

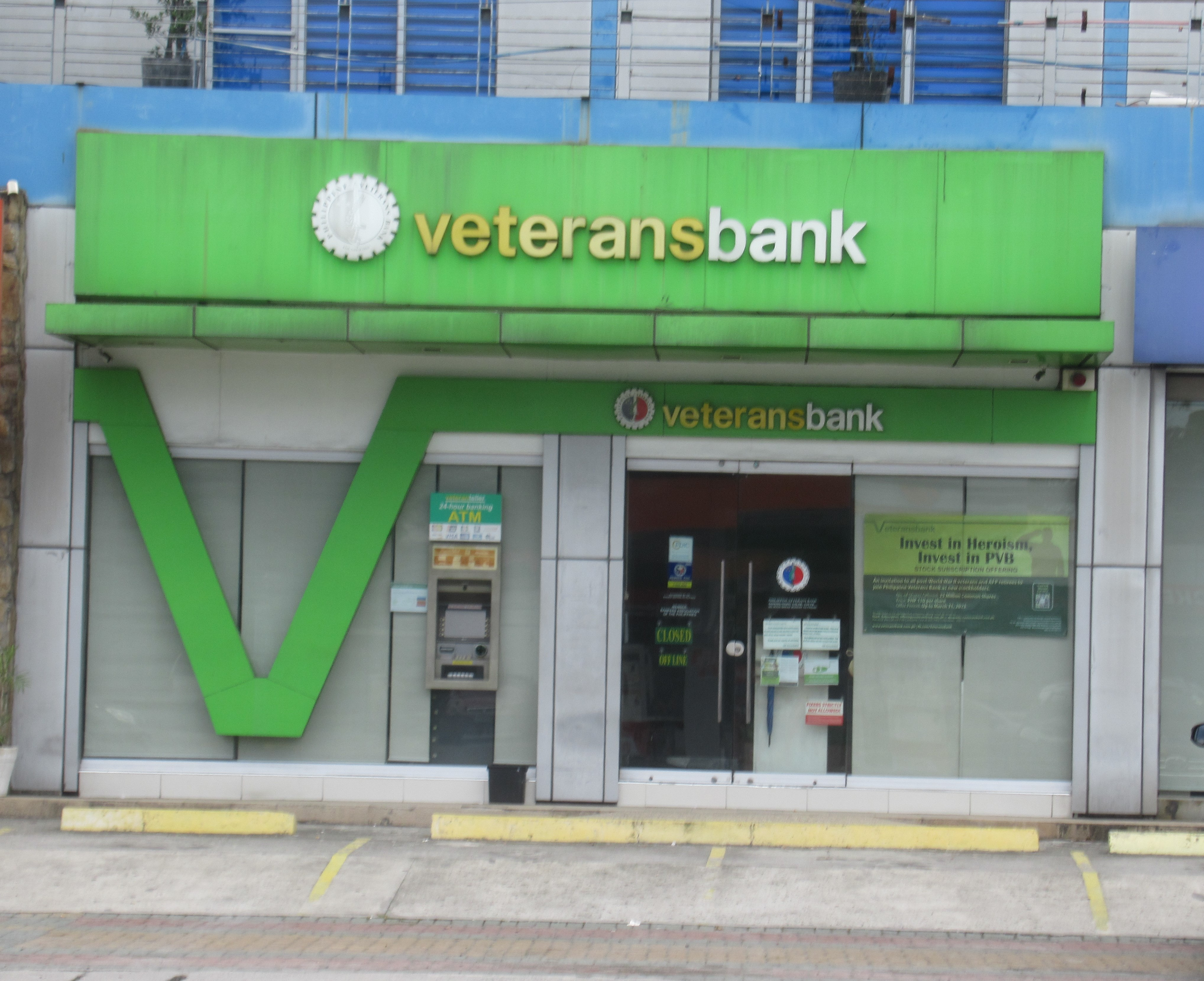
- A PVB branch in San Fernando, Pampanga
- Type: Private
- Industry: Banking
- Founded: June 18, 1963; 63 years ago in Manila, Philippines
- Headquarters: Makati, Philippines
- Key people: Roberto F. De Ocampo, OBE (Chairman & CEO); Guillermo L. Parayno Jr. (Vice-Chairman); Renato A. Claravall (President & COO)
- Products: deposits, loans, financial services
- Number of employees: 900
- Website: veteransbank.com.ph

Philippine Veterans Bank, also known as PVB and Veterans Bank, is a commercial bank in the Philippines. The bank is owned by Philippine World War II war veterans and their families and caters to both corporate and retail financial markets. As part of its charter, PVB allocates 20% of its annual net income for the benefit of its shareholders.

== History ==
The concept of a bank for veterans of World War II was conceived in 1956, when a war reparations agreement was signed between Japan and the Philippines. The agreement provided for US$20 million in cash, ₱5 million in capital and US$10 million in services. Under Republic Act No. 1789, better known as the Reparations Act, the cash reparations were set aside into a special trust fund for the use of World War II veterans and their families. There were plans to split the funds evenly among all veterans, but legislators say that it is in the higher interest that the funds be invested in a bank that would service their needs. If the fund were split at the time, each veteran would get only one hundred pesos at the then-prevailing exchange rate of two pesos per U.S. dollar.

Through the stirring words of Senator Camilo Osías, as shown in the excerpt below, the Philippine Veterans Bank was born on June 18, 1963, through Republic Act No. 3518, which would become its charter.

True patriotism seeks no reward for services rendered to the State at great sacrifice even at the cost of life itself; but it is also the duty of the State to create the necessary atmosphere and incentives for her citizens.

Under the PVB charter, the bank's subscribed capital of ₱100 million would be divided into 510,000 common shares and 490,000 preferred shares, all with a par value of one hundred pesos. All common shares were subscribed by the government on behalf of the veterans, their families and descendants, while the preferred shares were distributed for free among the veterans.

Unfortunately, the presidency of Ferdinand Marcos proved disastrous for the bank. Subsequent amendments to the PVB charter made through the use of presidential decrees enabled government control over the appointing of PVB's officers, even though the veterans would receive the right to elect their own board members five years after the organization of the bank through the transfer of PVB's common shares. That effectively curtailed the right of the veterans to choose their own board of directors even after all common shares were transferred to them. In essence, the veterans became PVB shareholders in name only. Due to capital deficiencies (and political excesses during the Marcos era), PVB was ordered closed by the Bangko Sentral ng Pilipinas on April 10, 1983, placed under receivership, and subsequently liquidated on June 17, 1985.

By the closure of PVB, a common and a preferred PVB share, worth a combined ₱200 (equivalent to ₱1,553 in 2021), was reduced to a worthless piece of paper. After twenty-three years, each veteran only received ₱28 (equivalent to ₱214.98 in 2021) worth of dividends as a return on their investment, or ₱14 (equivalent to ₱107.49 in 2021) per share.

With the EDSA Revolution and the subsequent ouster of Marcos, the new Philippine government passed Republic Act No. 7169, which would rescind all amendments made during the Marcos era to the PVB charter. The law would revert the PVB charter back to its original state. Through the law, the veterans regained their rights as rightful shareholders of the bank, which were denied during the Marcos era. Since the law also understood that the veterans took no role in the failure of PVB, it allowed the restructuring of its locked government deposits, totaling ₱1.48 billion at the time, into a seven-year loan. Unlike other banks of its classification, which were bailed out by the government, PVB had to rely on internal funds to keep its commercial banking license. Because of that, its authorized capital was raised to ₱1 billion from the previous ₱100 billion.

On May 6, 1992, the Bangko Sentral ng Pilipinas granted PVB the authority to operate as a private commercial bank, giving up all government control of the bank, and a month later, on June 3, was symbolically re-opened by President Fidel V. Ramos, himself a veteran (although not of World War II). The bank re-opened its doors for commercial operations a month after the symbolic re-opening with the opening of its new headquarters in Makati.

Since its re-opening, the bank grew rapidly, opening new branches in the countryside, even with a conservative investment stance. It arranged a conduit agreement with Union Bank of the Philippines to serve veterans who receive their veterans benefits checks but live in areas where there are no Veterans Bank branches. With its recapitalization, the original two shares of each veteran grew to 64 common and ten preferred shares, with a combined value of ₱6,400. PVB also embarked on goodwill programs for its veterans, such as free medical care. The bank also places preference to veterans in banking transactions, and places preference to their descendants when applying for PVB jobs. Even with a troubled history, the bank has not failed to only inspire, but also to stand strong in times of crisis.

Its former head office building at the Port Area beside the Department of Public Works and Highways (DPWH) Central Office has been demolished by 2025, starting the year prior.

== PVB Today ==
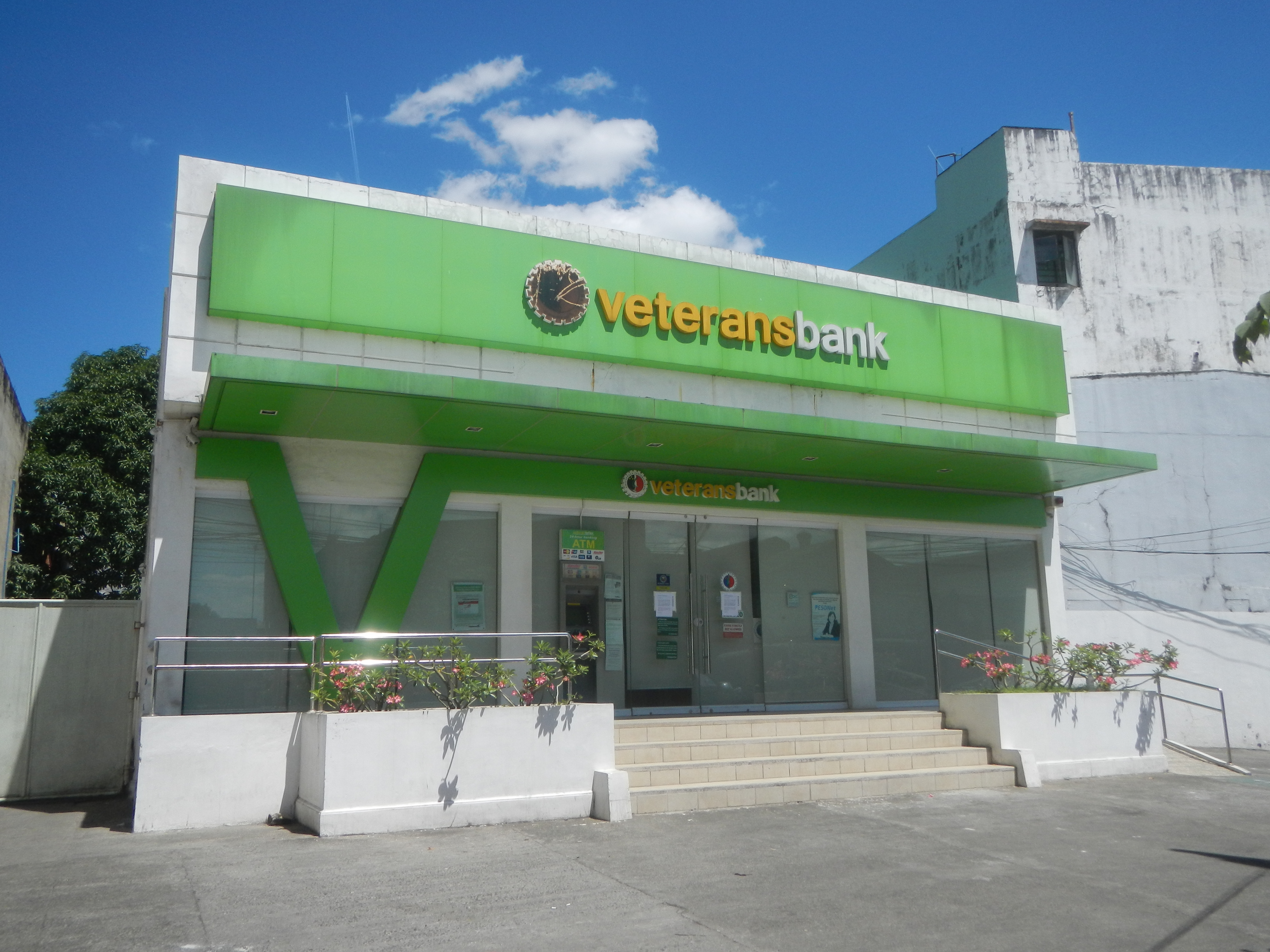
A Philippine Veterans Bank branch in Baliwag

PVB currently has 60 branches in key cities and municipalities nationwide, with the last 10 branches opening simultaneously in January 2010 under its "10 in 2010" branch expansion program. The bank aims to open several more branches in other key locations across the country to give World War II veterans and their families, as well as its other clients easier access and convenience to its products and services.

In 2010, PVB became a member of BancNet, the Philippines largest interbank network. The migration to BancNet allowed its over 200,000 cardholders 24/7 access to PVB through the network's over 4,000 ATMs nationwide as well as access to BancNet's multitude of services.

PVB named former Finance Secretary Roberto De Ocampo, a son of a World War II veteran, as its new Chairman in July 2013. Following the election of De Ocampo as Chairman, new directors with expertise gained from various industries including banking, finance, and economics joined the bank's Board.

In December 2018, Renato A. Claravall, who has been on the PVB's Board of Directors since 2015, was appointed the bank's new President and Chief Operating Officer.

== Awards ==
PVB's corporate social responsibility and commitment of service to the Filipino World War II veteran community have received recognition from various award-giving bodies throughout the years. Among the awards it has received include:

- Asian Banking Award for Customer Service for its Oplan Beterano (2004)
- IABC Gold Quill Award for its Oplan Beterano under the Customer Relations Category (2005)
- IABC Gold Quill Award for its PVB Traveling Exhibit in the Communications Management Division (2011)
- Silver Anvil Award for its History Wall project under the PR Tools: Exhibit and Special Event/Exhibit/Exposition category (2019)

== Subsidiaries and Affiliates ==
The bank is a member of BancNet.

Intervest Projects, Inc. is a wholly owned subsidiary of PVB.

Monarch Properties, Inc. was a wholly owned subsidiary of PVB before it was merged with the bank last November 2010 after receiving approval from the BSP.

== Ownership ==
PVB is 100% owned by Filipino World War II veterans, their families, heirs and descendants.

== Competition ==
As a private commercial bank, PVB competes with the other 36 universal and commercial banks in delivering banking and financial services to both corporate and retail markets.

It is however unique in that PVB is granted the authority to accept government deposits as mandated by law, Republic Act No. 7169 Section 6, as a gesture of the nation’s appreciation for the service of the World War II veterans of the Armed Forces and guerilla organizations.

== See also ==
- List of banks in the Philippines
- Bancnet
