= Tari Estate =

Special economic zone in Tarlac City, Philippines

Tari Estate (stylized as TARI) is a special economic zone in Tarlac City, Philippines associated with Aboitiz Equity Ventures, a Filipino conglomerate. It spans 200 hectares (0.77 square miles).

== Background and creation ==
On October 5, 2024, President Bongbong Marcos issued a proclamation to create a special economic zone for an industrial complex of Aboitiz Equity Ventures. It is the fourth special economic zone created for the Aboitiz group. Proclamation No. 701 was issued pursuant to the Special Economic Zone Act of 1995, as recommended by the Philippine Economic Zone Authority (PEZA)."

The groundbreaking ceremony for the Tari Estate was held in May 7, 2024.

== Land ==
Tari Estate spans 200 ha (0.77 sq mi) over Tarlac City. The land is planned to generate 60,000 jobs, with electricity and power generated by Aboitiz. The land contains assets such as retail, office spaces, households, and other types of assets.
