= Aboitiz Equity Ventures =

Philippine conglomerate

Aboitiz Equity Ventures Inc.

- Ayala Triangle Gardens Tower 2, site of the headquarters of the Aboitiz Equity Ventures
- Formerly: Cebu Pan Asian Holdings
- Type: Public
- Traded as: PSE: AEV
- Founded: September 11, 1989; 37 years ago
- Headquarters: 32nd Floor, Ayala Triangle Gardens Tower 2, Paseo de Roxas corner Makati Ave, Makati Central Business District, Makati City, 1226 Metro Manila, Philippines, Philippines
- Key people: Enrique M. Aboitiz (chairman); Mikel A. Aboitiz (vice chairman); Sabin M. Aboitiz (president and CEO); Toto Hilado (CFO)
- Revenue: ₱302.82 billion (2024)
- Net income: ₱18.13 billion (2024)
- Total assets: ₱893.70 billion (2024)
- Number of employees: 203
- Website: aboitiz.com

Aboitiz Equity Ventures, Inc. (AEV) is a Philippine holding company based in Metro Manila, with roots in Cebu City. The conglomerate operates in several industries, including power, banking and financial services, food, infrastructure, data science, and artificial intelligence. In 2017, the company ranked 1,793rd on the Forbes Global 2000. In 2022, AEV began transforming its organization into a "techglomerate", which it described as a faster, stronger, and better version of a conglomerate. The term techglomerate can refer either to a technology startup that has grown into a conglomerate or to an established conglomerate that has transformed its operations and organizational culture by adopting technology and startup practices. AEV describes itself as the latter.

== History ==
The company was founded on September 11, 1989, as Cebu Pan Asian Holdings; the name was changed to the current designation in 1993. The company went public on November 16, 1994.

== Business units ==
=== Power ===
Aboitiz Power Corporation is a holding company engaged in power distribution, generation, and retail electricity services. It owns Davao Light and Power Company in Davao City, Cotabato Light and Power Company in Cotabato City, Visayan Electric Company in Metro Cebu, the Mariveles Coal-Fired Power Plant in Mariveles, Bataan, Therma South, Inc. Coal Fired Power Plant in Davao City, and Therma Visayas, Inc. Coal Fired Power Plant in Toledo, Cebu.

=== Banking and financial services ===
- Union Bank of the Philippines (UnionBank)
  - CitySavings (formerly Cebu City Savings and Loan Association), savings bank of UnionBank
- PETNET

=== Food and beverages ===
Aboitiz Foods is composed of Pilmico Foods Corporation (Pilmico) and Gold Coin Management Holdings, Ltd. (Gold Coin), the integrated agribusiness and food company of the Aboitiz Group. Pilmico is a leader in operating efficiency, manufacturing flour and wheat by-products in the Philippines. It has also been a strong player in animal feeds and swine production since establishing these businesses in the late 1990s. Meanwhile, Gold Coin is manufacturing animal feed in Asia.

On February 23, 2024, the company announced that it has jointly acquired Coca-Cola Beverages Philippines Inc. together with Coca-Cola Europacific Partners (CCEP) for $1.8 billion on a debt-free, cash-free basis. It will hold a 40% stake, while CCEP will take up the remaining 60% stake. In 2025, Coca-Cola Beverages Philippines, Inc. has changed the company's legal name to Coca-Cola Europacific Aboitiz Philippines, Inc. (CCEAP).

=== Infrastructure ===
Aboitiz InfraCapital Inc. undertakes all infrastructure and infrastructure-related investments of the Aboitiz Group.

- Water
  - Apo Agua Infrastructura
  - LIMA Water
  - Balibago Waterworks Systems Inc.
- Economic Estates
  - LIMA Estate
  - MEZ2 Estate
  - West Cebu Estate
  - Tari Estate
- Digital Infrastructure (Unity Digital Infrastructure)
- Airports
  - Bicol International Airport
  - Bohol–Panglao International Airport
  - Laguindingan International Airport
  - Mactan–Cebu International Airport
- The Republic Cement Group (with CRH plc), founded in 1955, produces about 7 million tons of cement annually. It is the second largest producer in the Philippines and produces about a quarter of the country's cement. In 2017, AEV announced it would invest $300 million in the subsidiary to increase capacity.

=== Land ===
Aboitiz Land, Inc. (Aboitiz Land) is the real estate arm of Aboitiz Group, engaging in the design and development of communities for residential use. Rafael Fernandez de Mesa, head of Economic Estates at Aboitiz InfraCapital, is the new Chief executive officer of Aboitiz Land Inc. effective January 1, 2025, succeeding David Rafael.

- LIMA Technology Park
- Mactan Economic Zone II
- West Cebu Industrial Park

=== Data science and artificial intelligence ===
Aboitiz Data Innovation is the Data Science and Artificial Intelligence arm of the Aboitiz Group.
