= Mactan Economic Zone =

Mactan Economic Zone (MEZ), also known as the Mactan Export Processing Zone (MEPZ), is a manufacturing special economic zone (MSEZ) located in Lapu-Lapu City, Cebu, Philippines. Spanning of 150 hectares (370 acres) of land, the economic zone is composed of two areas, namely MEPZ 1 and MEPZ 2, both home to more than 200 locators of the industrial, commercial, and retail industry.

Both areas of the Mactan Economic Zone are operated by different developers. MEPZ 1 being operated by the Philippine Economic Zone Authority (PEZA), while MEPZ 2 is operated by the Philippine real-estate conglomerate Aboitiz Group.

== History ==
The Mactan Economic Zone was established through the signing of Proclamation No. 1811 in 1979 by Philippine President Ferdinand Marcos. In 1996, MEPZ 2 was later established, with PEZA authorizing Aboitizland, Inc. to install and operate power distribution facilities within the 63-hectare ecozone.

=== Proposed expansions ===
In 2020, PEZA eyed for a 200-hectare coastal expansion of the economic zone through reclamation. As a second runway was proposed by its neighboring Mactan-Cebu International Airport (MCIA) at that time, developers of the airport proposed to construct the runway within the economic zone involving reclamation. PEZA Director-General Charito Plaza later raised a concern that the construction of a runway within the ecozone will cost ₱150 billion in damages as it may interrupt business operations within the area.

In 2025, PEZA began to revive the expansion of the Mactan Economic Zone, along with a new 20-hectare Aerotropolis Ecozone development. A 50-hectare reclamation in the Mactan Channel was then proposed for the MEPZ 1 expansion, hoping to reduce landfill dependency and lower carbon footprint of locators while benefiting nearby communities.

=== 2022 MEZ job retrenchment ===
In 2023, Lapu-Lapu City's head of the Public Employment Service Office (PESO) Kim Domingo, reported that more that more than 4,000 workers were laid off from two major garment firms at the Mactan Economic Zone amid financial restraints caused by the prevailing COVID-19 pandemic and the aftermath of the recent Typhoon Rai.

The Sports City group of companies, the owner of the five major garment companies situated in the economic zone, cited that domestic and global issues led to greater financial restraints, and thus forced them to retrench 75 percent of their workforce in September 2022, though the affected workers were promised to receive a legal separation pay.

Prior to the job retrenchment in 2022, more than 4,000 workers were also retrenched 2 years prior, in September 2020 at the height of the COVID-19 pandemic.
