= Bank of Commerce =

Bank in the Philippines

- Formerly: Overseas Bank of Manila (1963–1968); Commercial Bank of Manila (1980–1988); Boston Bank of the Philippines (1988–1991)
- Type: Subsidiary
- Industry: Banking; Financial services
- Founded: December 16, 1963; 62 years ago January 8, 1981; 45 years ago (as Commercial Bank of Manila)
- Founder: Emerito Ramos Sr.
- Headquarters: Mandaluyong, Metro Manila, Philippines
- Area served: Philippines
- Key people: Francis C. Chua (Chairman); Benedicta A. Du-Baladad (Vice Chairman); Michelangelo R. Aguilar (President & CEO)
- Products: Deposit, Corporate Banking, Commercial Loans, Credit Card Services, Treasury, Asset Management, Transaction Banking, and Trust and Investments
- Net income: PHP0.65 billion (2019)
- Total assets: PHP145.0 billion (2019)
- Total equity: PHP16.1 billion (2019)
- Parent: San Miguel Corporation
- Website: www.bankcom.com.ph

Bank of Commerce (PSE: BNCOM), commonly known as BankCom, is a Philippine universal bank that is licensed by the Bangko Sentral ng Pilipinas (BSP). BankCom is the banking arm of diversified conglomerate San Miguel Corporation (SMC). It has a total network of 140 branches and 260 automated teller machines (ATMs) located nationwide, as of 2020.

Founded by Emerito Ramos in December 1963, BankCom's initial incarnation as the Overseas Bank of Manila lasted only five years, from 1963 until its closure by the BSP in 1968 due to suffering a bank run. It was reopened as the Commercial Bank of Manila under new ownership in January 1981, but was soon sold to the Government Service Insurance System a year later in the aftermath of the financial crisis caused by Dewey Dee. The bank was later sold to the Bank of Boston in 1988, and was renamed the Boston Bank of the Philippines. By 1991, it acquired its current name, Bank of Commerce, and was sold to Filipino owners in 1993.

As of 2022, BankCom is the fifteenth largest bank in the Philippines in terms of assets.

== History ==
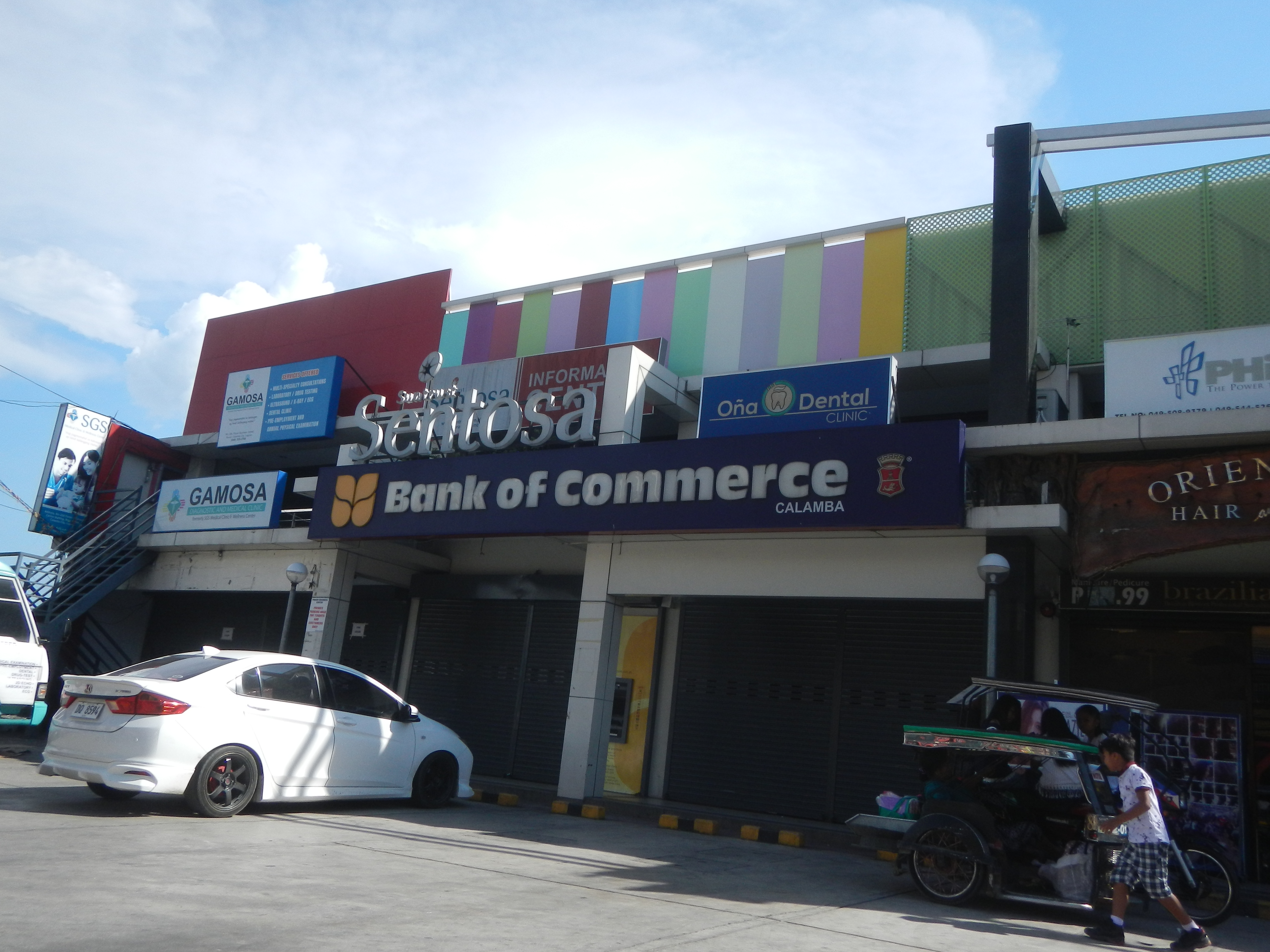
A Bank of Commerce branch in Calamba, Laguna

BankCom was founded on December 16, 1963 as the Overseas Bank of Manila (OBM) by Emerito Ramos Sr., with headquarters in Binondo, Manila. The bank has since evolved through different phases of growth.

In 1968, a bank run occurred at the OBM, which caused it to become the first commercial bank to be closed by the Central Bank (now Bangko Sentral) since the latter's establishment in 1949.

In May 1979, Atrium Capital Corporation was granted the right to rehabilitate OBM by the Central Bank, which gave it ₱100 million for financial assistance, while other firms such as Asia Pacific Finance Corp., Anselmo Trinidad & Co., and the Angara, Abello, Regala Law Firm assisted with the rehabilitation. By September, however, the Central Bank ordered Atrium to halt its negotiations with OBM's creditors and depositors, and pushed its deadline for reopening to January 1981.

The Overseas Bank of Manila was renamed the Commercial Bank of Manila (Combank), and began commercial operations anew on January 8, 1981, with Jose H.V. Ferro as president and Antonio P. Gatmaitan as chairman of the board. However, a day after Combank's reopening, a financial crisis began due to the sudden departure of textile businessman and banker Dewey Dee from the Philippines on January 9, 1981 with ₱700 million in unpaid obligations, which led to a liquidity crisis among banks. Combank's owner Atrium was deemed the hardest hit investment bank in the financial crisis, resulting in the Central Bank ordering its merger with two other firms: Apcor and International Corporate Bank, both of which are under Herminio Disini's conglomerate Herdis. Herdis' equity in Combank was soon bought by the Government Service Insurance System in early 1982, and by November 5, Combank was made a subsidiary of GSIS. In September 1984, Combank acquired Royal Savings Bank.

Bank of Boston, one of the oldest and leading banks in the United States together with a local investment group acquired ComBank in 1988. The bank was then renamed the Boston Bank of the Philippines.

In November 1991, the bank changed its official name to Bank of Commerce. With the buyout of Bank of Boston's majority interest in 1993, Bank of Commerce was placed under complete Filipino ownership. As part of its growth plans, Bank of Commerce acquired Pan Asia Bank and purchased selected assets and liabilities of Trader’s Royal Bank in 2001. These takeovers significantly increased the Bank’s presence in the banking industry.

In 2008, San Miguel Properties, Inc., a subsidiary of San Miguel Corporation (SMC), and San Miguel Corporation Retirement Fund, the registered retirement plan of SMC Group employees, became the controlling shareholders of Bank of Commerce. San Miguel Properties, Inc. has 39.89% of ownership and San Miguel Corporation Retirement Fund has 39.94% of ownership, as of December 31, 2019.

On January 16, 2013, the Securities and Exchange Commission (SEC) approved the extension of the corporate life of Bank of Commerce for another 50 years from December 16, 2013.

== Lehman Brothers' exposure ==
On September 17, 2008, Bangko Sentral ng Pilipinas announced that 7 Philippine banks have $386M in exposure to Lehman Brothers. Bank of Commerce was one of those affected having $15 million in exposure to the bankrupt US investment banking giant but the bank’s exposure was fully provided for as with the other affected banks.
