= UnionBank Plaza =

Office skyscraper in Pasig, Philippines

- Interactive map of the UnionBank Plaza area
- Former names: World Finance Plaza

General information
- Status: Completed
- Type: Office
- Location: Meralco Avenue corner Onyx & Sapphire Streets, Ortigas Center, Pasig, Philippines
- Coordinates: 14°35′13.45″N 121°3′48.51″E
- Completed: 2004
- Opening: 2004
- Cost: ₱1,900,000,000
- Owner: Union Bank of the Philippines

Height
- Roof: 206 m (675.85 ft)

Technical details
- Floor count: 49 aboveground, 6 belowground
- Lifts/elevators: 15

Design and construction
- Architects: Recio + Casas Architects, RTKL Associates (design consultant)
- Developer: Union Properties, Inc.
- Structural engineer: Ove Arup & Partners, G.E. Origenes & Associates

Other information
- Public transit: Future: MMS Ortigas

UnionBank Plaza is an office skyscraper located in Pasig, Philippines. It rises 206 meters (676 ft) from ground level to roof, and is currently the 4th-tallest building in Pasig, and the 33rd-tallest building in the country and Metro Manila as well. The building has 49 levels above ground, and 6 basement levels.

True to its name, the bank serves as the headquarters for Union Bank of the Philippines, the seventh-largest bank in the Philippines in terms of assets. Other tenants of UnionBank Plaza include major business process outsourcing companies, like Sykes Enterprises, Branders.com, PCCW, among others. However, the building's main tenant, UnionBank, also maintains some executive offices at the SSS Building in Makati.

== Design and construction ==
Originally the building is owned and developed by Megaworld Corporation, and was known as the World Finance Plaza, but during construction the project was taken over by Union Properties, Inc., the real estate arm of Union Bank of the Philippines, and was renamed "UnionBank Plaza".

UnionBank Plaza was designed by renowned Filipino architectural firm Recio & Casas, with American architectural firm RTKL Associates as its design consultant. The structural design of the building was handled by British engineering group Ove Arup & Partners in cooperation with local engineering group G.E. Origenes & Associates. Project Management was handled by Union Properties, Inc. headed by Arch't. Cynthia V. Razon with her staff, Arch't Contrino del Carmen, Eng'r. Carlo Salvatierra and Arch't Angelo Torres. Construction Management works were undertaken by Jose Aliling & Associates, a well known project management company in the Philippines.

The building has an 8-level concrete podium as its base, while its main body is fully clad with aluminium unitized curtain wall.

== Amenities ==
The building has a 6-level basement and 7-level aboveground level parking for its tenants and guests, and has a helipad on the rooftop. The building features an executive skylounge at the 47th floor. Other amenities of the building include function rooms, health club, restaurants, and food court.

== See also ==
- List of tallest buildings in the Philippines
