= Overseas Filipino Bank =

Bank in the Philippines

- Logo

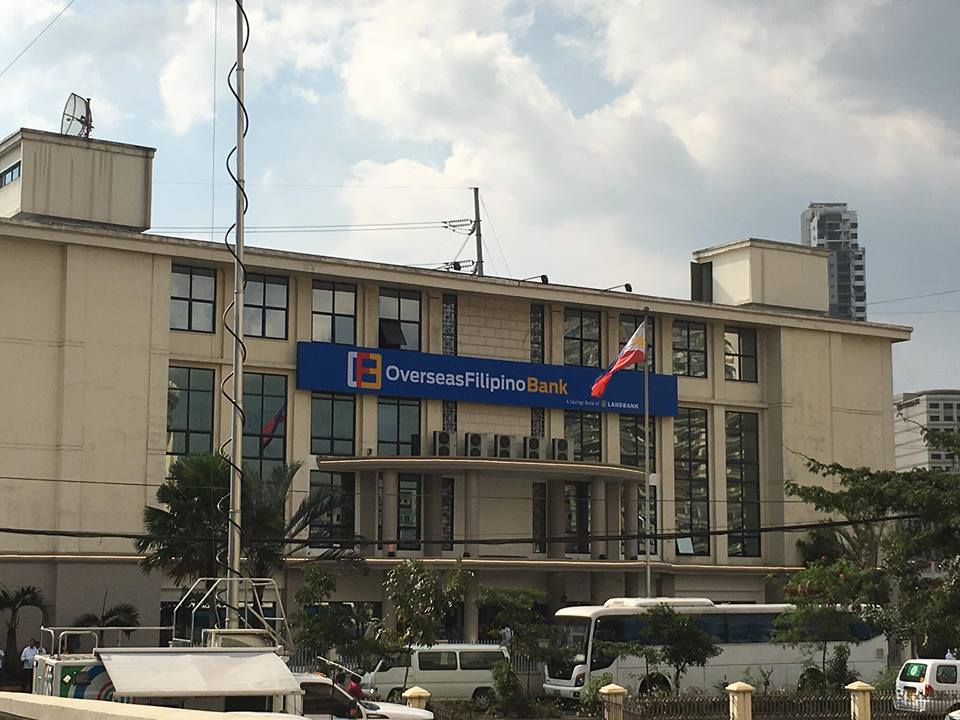
- OFBank Head Office in Liwasang Bonifacio, Manila
- Formerly: Philippine Postal Savings Bank, Inc (1906–1976, 1994–2018)
- Type: State-owned
- Industry: Finance and Insurance
- Founded: Manila, Philippines (May 24, 1906; 120 years ago) (1994; 32 years ago)
- Headquarters: Manila, Philippines
- Key people: Ma. Lynette V. Ortiz, (Chairman); Randolph L. Montesa, (Vice Chairman, President and CEO)
- Net income: P-609.27 million PHP (2019)
- Parent: Philippine Postal Corporation 1994-2017; Land Bank of the Philippines since 2018
- Website: www.ofbank.com.ph

The Overseas Filipino Bank (OFBank) is the state-owned digital-only, branchless bank in the Philippines. Formerly known as the Philippine Postal Savings Bank (PPSB) or PostBank, it is the smallest of the Philippines' three state-owned banks (the others being Land Bank of the Philippines and Development Bank of the Philippines), and is the 16th largest thrift banks in terms of assets. Its services are catered to the needs of Overseas Filipinos (OFs), Overseas Filipino Worker (OFWs), and their families or beneficiaries. Since 2018, it has been a subsidiary of LandBank.

== History ==
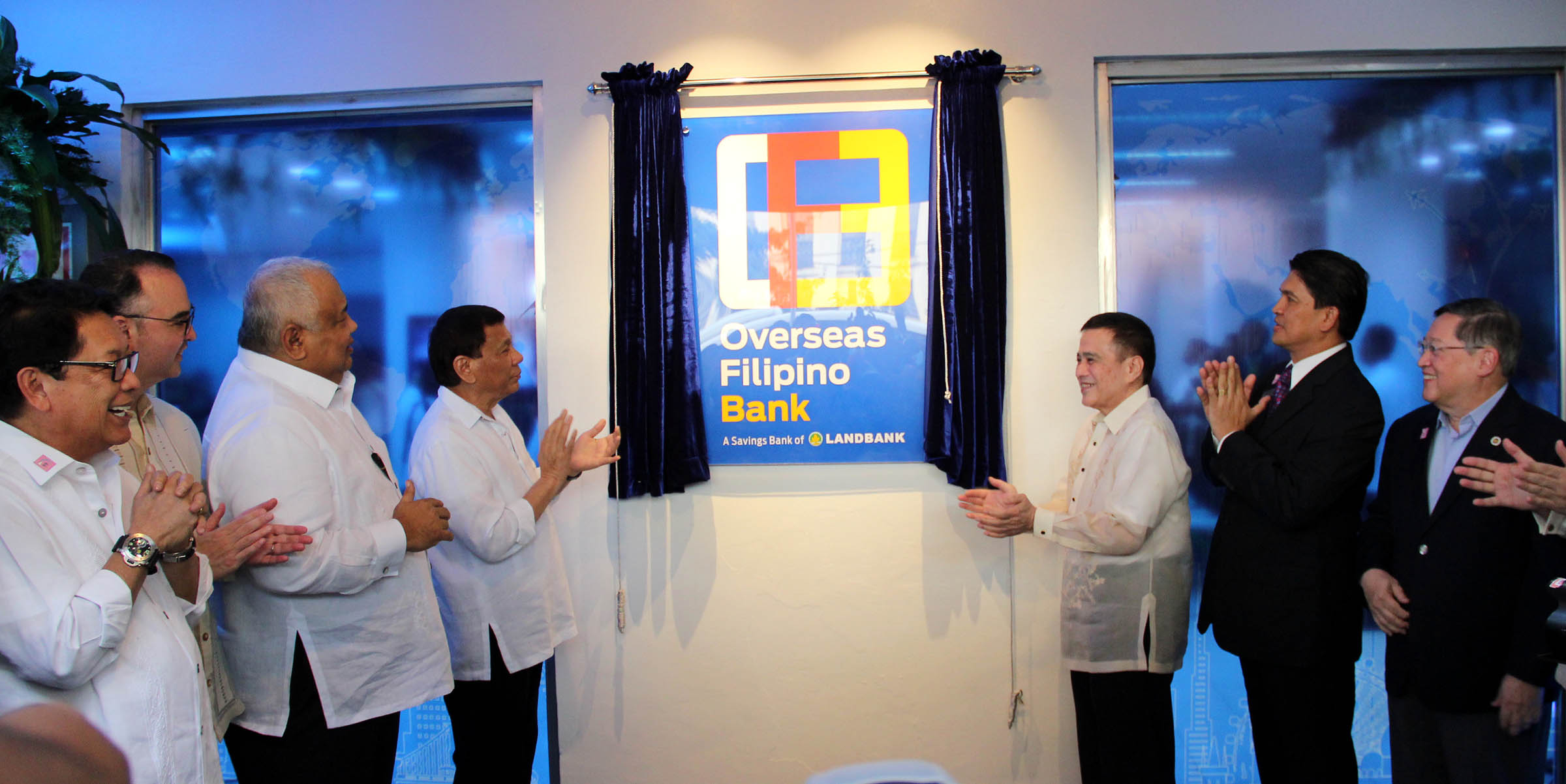
President Rodrigo Duterte (4th from left) leads the unveiling of the logo of the Overseas Filipino Bank (OFBank) during the launching on January 18, 2018, at the Postbank Center in Manila.

The Overseas Filipino Bank was established as Philippine Postal Savings Bank in 1906. Governor-General of the Philippines, William Howard Taft, commissioned a report in 1903 to consider the advisability of establishing the bank. The report was submitted to the Philippine Commission in 1904, which subsequently recommended the establishment of the bank. Legislation to create the bank was passed by the Philippine Commission on May 24, 1906. The bank followed the model of similar banks in British colonies.

The bank was closed in 1976 as a result of competition with privately owned banks, but was reopened in 1994 pursuant to the provisions of Republic Act No. 7354, the charter of the Philippine Postal Corporation. In 2013, the bank rebranded its operations as "Postbank". Despite the legal affiliation, the PPSB is governed separately from PhilPost.

On November 16, 2016, Land Bank of the Philippines announced plans to acquire Postbank and reorganize the thrift bank to be a lending bank for the Overseas Filipino Workers (OFWs) and their families. President Rodrigo Duterte issued Executive Order No. 44 in September 2017 which mandates the Philippine Postal Corporation and the Bureau of the Treasury their PostBank shares to Land Bank at zero value. The edict also states that PostBank will be converted to the "Overseas Filipino Bank".

The Monetary Board of the Bangko Sentral ng Pilipinas (BSP), the Philippines' central bank, approved Land Bank's acquisition of PostBank in December 2017 while the Philippine Competition Commission authorized Land Bank to acquire PostBank on January 11, 2018. The bank was inaugurated as the Overseas Filipino Bank at the Postbank Center by President Duterte on January 17, 2018.

On June 29, 2020, Land Bank of the Philippines virtually launched the Overseas Filipino Bank (OFBank) which aims to help Filipinos employed abroad to send money back to the Philippines faster. The virtual launch includes the presentation of OFBank’s new offerings such as digital accounts opening platform catering to OFWs, other Overseas Filipinos (OFs), and their families or beneficiaries, as well as the improved website and official Facebook page. As it is a digital-only bank, OFWs and their beneficiaries can just submit all requirements online through OFBank's mobile app.

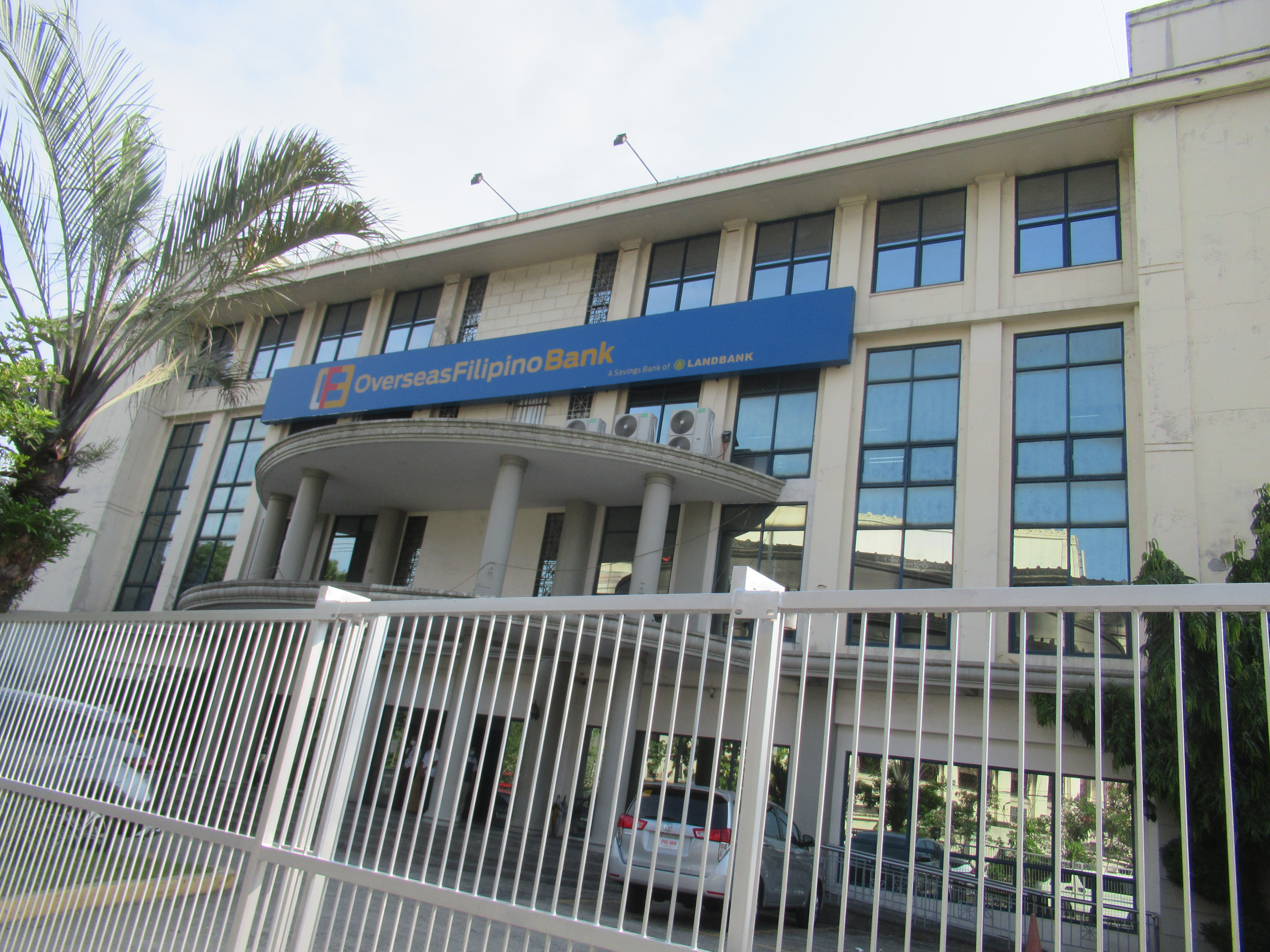
Facade in May 2023

OFBank initially after its launch operated as a "digital-centric" bank using its license to operate as a thrift bank. It transitioned to a fully digital bank after it was given a license to operate as a digital-only bank on March 25, 2021, by the BSP's Monetary Board. OFBank became the first authorized digital-only bank in the Philippines.

== Leadership ==
=== Board of Directors ===
- Chairman: Ma. Lynette V. Ortiz
- Vice-Chairman: Randolph L. Montesa
- Members:
  - Alan V. Bornas
  - Bituin V. Salcedo
  - Robert L. Gosioco
  - Leticia V. Damasco
  - Alex A. Lorayes
  - Atty. Roderick P. Sacro
- Board Secretary: Atty. Jettmar Aswige Taliping

=== Management Team ===
- Randolph L. Montesa - President & CEO
- Pacifico C. De Paz Jr. - Vice President, Technology Management Unit
- Mary C. Calacasan - Head, Administrative Services Unit
- Maria Chona P. Gregorio - Central Point of Contact & Treasurer (Seconded from LANDBANK)
- Joanna C. Sangrador - Head, Electronic Business Unit
- Patricia P. Madrio - Head, Financial Management Unit

Other LANDBANK Seconded Personnel:

- Jose Aryiel G. Castor - Relationship Officer
- Romelita M. Atienza - Technical Assistant to the President & CEO
- Christine Anne N. Salapare - Senior Administrative Specialist

== See also ==
- List of banks in the Philippines
- Digital banks in the Philippines
