= Dewey Dee =

Filipino businessman involved in the 1981 Philippine financial crisis

- Occupation: Businessman
- Known for: 1981 debt default and ensuing Philippine financial crisis
- Father: Rufino Deeunhong
- Relatives: Donald Dee (brother)

Dewey Go Dee, commonly known as Dewey Dee, is a Filipino businessman of Chinese descent and former textile magnate. His sudden departure from the Philippines on January 9, 1981, leaving approximately ₱700 million in unpaid obligations, precipitated a liquidity crisis subsequently characterized by the Bangko Sentral ng Pilipinas (BSP) as the first systemic crisis in the Philippine financial market.

== Business career ==
Before 1981, Dee headed a diversified group of textile businesses. Its flagship company was Continental Manufacturing Corporation (CMC), a joint venture founded by his father Rufino Deeunhong in which Mitsubishi Rayon held a 25-percent interest, Mitsubishi Corporation held 7 percent, and Marubeni held 7.5 percent. Dee's group also participated in joint ventures with Japanese companies through several other textile enterprises. He and his fellow textile businessmen Ramon Siy and Philip Ang were described as the "three musketeers" in Philippine banking.

== 1981 default and financial crisis ==
On January 9, 1981, Dee fled the Philippines, leaving unpaid obligations that contemporary reports valued at more than US$80 million. The BSP later placed the total at approximately ₱700 million. Although the amount represented less than one percent of outstanding private-sector credit, the default destabilized a financial system that depended heavily on the continual rollover of short-term debt.

The interruption of credit produced a wider liquidity panic. Investors declined to renew commercial paper, while investment houses and other intermediaries faced demands for payment. A study published by the National Bureau of Economic Research described Dee's departure as leading to the virtual collapse of a segment of the Philippine money market and to runs on banks and investment houses.

According to the BSP's retrospective account, the resulting disruption led to the closure of 16 commercial banks, 12 investment houses, and 17 other financial institutions. Among them was the investment firm Bancom Development Corp. of Sixto K. Roxas, which was thus absorbed by Union Bank. Academic accounts also associate the panic with tighter domestic credit, business failures, and increased capital flight from the Philippines. Time described the episode as having thrown Philippine financial institutions into turmoil.

== Proceedings in Canada ==
Dee arrived in Canada in 1983 on a visitor visa and subsequently applied for recognition as a Convention refugee. His initial application was refused, but the Immigration Appeal Board declared him a refugee on appeal in 1985. Canadian court records state that his refugee claim was based on his opposition to the government of President Ferdinand Marcos.

A removal order issued against Dee in 1988 was set aside by the Immigration and Refugee Board's Appeal Division on humanitarian and compassionate grounds. The division cited the presence of his family in Canada, his establishment in the country, and what it described as his positive contribution to Canadian society. In 1995, his Canadian-citizen wife sponsored an application for his permanent residence.

Canadian immigration officials subsequently refused Dee's applications for rehabilitation and permanent residence after considering criminal accusations originating in the Philippines. Dee categorically denied committing any offence. In 2000, the Federal Court of Canada quashed both refusals, finding that the immigration authorities had denied him procedural fairness by withholding material concerning the accusations and by relying on an incomplete record. The court ordered the applications to be reconsidered and noted that the Canadian Security Intelligence Service and Royal Canadian Mounted Police had reported no evidence of criminal activity by Dee during his 17 years in Canada.
