= First Consolidated Bank =

Savings bank in the Philippines

Coordinates: 9°39′04″N 123°51′20″E

- Company type: Private
- Industry: Finance and Insurance
- Founded: Tagbilaran City, Bohol, Philippines (1982)
- Headquarters: CPG North Avenue, Taloto District, Tagbilaran City, Bohol
- Key people: Clariville Paz Uy-Evardone (Chairman); Argeo J. Melisimo (Vice Chairman); Joseph M. Lacea (President & Director)
- Products: Financial services
- Net income: P520.8 million PHP (▲85%) (2014)
- Number of employees: 1,556
- Website: www.fcb.com.ph

The First Consolidated Bank (FCB) is a private, independent development savings bank organized in 1982 in the province of Bohol in the Philippines by a group of Filipino business people. It operates out of Tagbilaran City, and has 79 branches in different parts of the country.

== History ==
First Consolidated Bank was established in 1982 as a result of the consolidation of 14 independent rural banks in the province of Bohol. The consolidation of these rural banks, the first in Philippine banking history, resulted in the conversion of these rural banks into branches of First Consolidated. In 1993, FCB started expanding into many parts of the Visayas, Mindanao, and Luzon. The bank has 130 banking offices & and promotional centers nationwide (as of January 2019).

In December 1996, the Securities and Exchange Commission approved the bank's amendment to operate as a private development bank in accordance with Republic Act No. 7906, otherwise known as the Thrift Bank Act of 1995. (Lyssa)

In 2003, the bank was awarded "the most outstanding countryside financial institution (CFI)" by the Land Bank of the Philippines.

FCB was involved as an appellee in an appeal before the Third Division of the Supreme Court of the Philippines. In LPBS Commercial, Inc., v. Amila and the First Consolidated Bank (FCB) of Bohol, Inc., the petitioner sought to fight a foreclosure by making an interlocutory appeal, but the case was dismissed in favor of FCB, with an admonition to the petitioner and its lawyers:

The propensity of litigants and lawyers to disregard the hierarchy of courts in our judicial system by seeking relief directly from this Court must be put to a halt for two reasons: (1) it would be an imposition upon the precious time of this Court; and (2) it would cause an inevitable and resultant delay, intended or otherwise, in the adjudication of cases, which in some instances had to be remanded or referred to the lower court as the proper forum under the rules of procedure, or as better equipped to resolve the issues because this Court is not a trier of facts.

— LPBS Commercial, Inc., v. Amila and the First Consolidated Bank (FCB) of Bohol, Inc.

In 2012, FCB opened five new branches, bringing their total number of branches to 58. In 2013, they opened an additional branch in Tigbauan.

The treasury of Bohol Province has deposited some tax revenues in FCB as of March 2013, in their effort to collect more taxes owed. The Social Security System cited FCB in their 2013 awards.

As of 2014, FBC had at least one branch still operational in Tacloban, after Typhoon Haiyan.

== See also ==
- List of banks in the Philippines
