= UnionBank (Philippines) =

Universal banking group located in the Philippines

Union Bank of the Philippines, Inc.

- View of UnionBank Plaza at night
- Formerly: Union Savings and Mortgage Bank
- Type: Public
- Traded as: PSE: UBP
- Industry: Finance and Insurance
- Founded: August 16, 1968; 58 years ago in Manila, Philippines
- Headquarters: UnionBank Plaza, Ortigas Center, Pasig, Philippines
- Area served: Philippines
- Key people: Erramon I. Aboitiz (chairman); Justo A. Ortiz (vice chairman); Ana Maria Aboitiz Delgado (president and CEO)
- Products: Digital banking Consumer banking Commercial Banking; Mutual Funds; Insurance; Private Banking; Credit Cards
- Revenue: ▲ ₱38.58 billion (2020)
- Net income: ▼ ₱11.55 billion (2020)
- Total assets: ▲ ₱774.46 billion (2020)
- Number of employees: 3,525 (2020)
- Capital ratio: Tier 1 15.0% (2020)
- Website: www.unionbankph.com

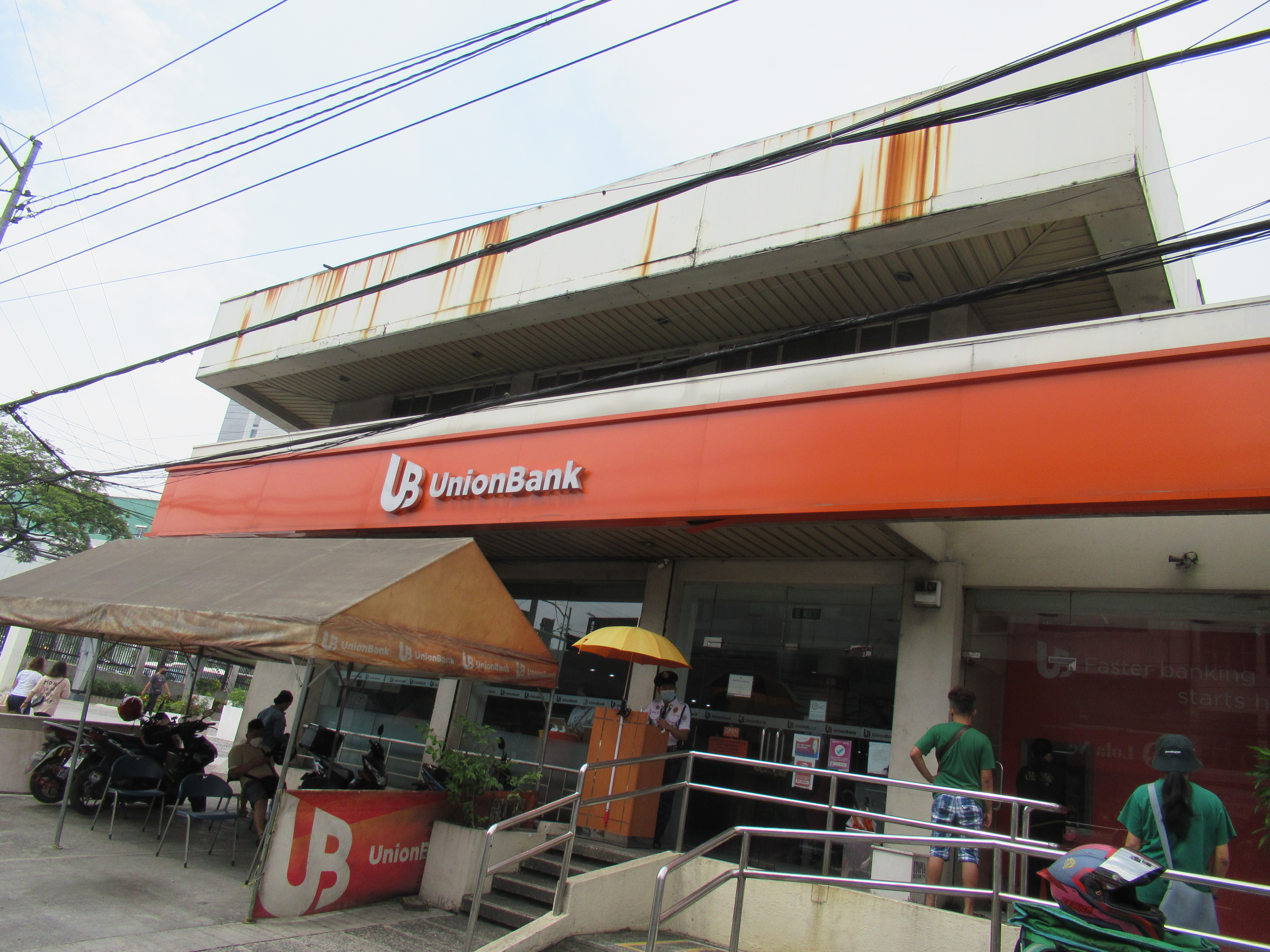
A UnionBank branch in Valenzuela

Union Bank of the Philippines, Inc., more commonly known as UnionBank, is one of the universal banks in the Philippines and the ninth largest bank in the country by assets.

UnionBank is a joint consortium among the Aboitiz Group, Insular Life, and the Social Security System. It started operations in 1981 and became a commercial bank on January 19, 1982. In July 1992, UnionBank was granted the license to operate as a universal bank.

== History ==
=== Founding ===
The bank was originally incorporated as “Union Savings and Mortgage Bank” on August 16, 1968. After the initial public offering the bank's shares were listed at the Philippine Stock Exchange (PSE) on June 29, 1992.

=== Licensing as universal bank ===
On July 15, 1992, the bank was granted the license to operate as a universal bank and changed its current name to Union Bank of the Philippines (UBP).

=== Mergers and acquisitions ===
In 1981, Bancom Development Corporation (Bancom), touted as the country's first and premier investment bank merged with UnionBank as part of the fallout of businessman Dewey Dee's absconding from the country.

In 1993, UnionBank merged with International Corporate Bank ("Interbank") and in 2006, another merger with International Exchange Bank ("iBank") followed (after first being denied by iBank).

In 2013, UnionBank acquired City Savings Bank, making City Savings Bank a 100% UnionBank subsidiary and consolidating Aboitiz group's banking units.

On December 23, 2021, it struck an agreement to acquire the consumer banking operations of Citibank Philippines from Citigroup for ₱55 billion. The deal was closed effective 1 August 2022.

=== Opening of UnionDigital ===
In 2021, UnionBank was one of only six applicants licensed by the Bangko Sentral ng Pilipinas to open a digital bank, prior to its announcement of a three-year moratorium on digital bank licenses. This means that UnionBank's new Digital Bank, known as Union Digital Bank (UnionDigital) will be one of only six digital banks in the Philippines for at least three years, alongside Overseas Filipino Bank, Tonik Digital Bank, UNObank, GOtyme, and Maya Bank.

On July 12, 2022, the Bangko Sentral ng Pilipinas granted UnionDigital the Certificate of Authority to Operate. It commenced operations on July 18 as UnionDigital Bank Inc. In November of the same year, UnionBank's digital banking unit EON merged its operations with UnionDigital Bank. however, UnionDigital Bank continued its existing EON's products and services to its customers after a transition until May 31, 2023.

=== Launch of crypto services ===
UnionBank is one of the first financial institutions in the Philippines to adopt cryptocurrency, and was the first local lender to release its own stablecoin in 2019, named PHX, which gives rural banks easier access to remittance and payments. In 2019, the bank also launched crypto ATMs that allow its account holders with crypto wallets to withdraw cash that is converted from crypto as well as trade on the spot.

In January 2022, there were reports confirming that UnionBank plans to launch crypto trading and custodial services. On 20 January 2022, METACO issued a press release to announce that its digital asset custody solution will be used to manage the bank’s crypto assets.

=== Change of leadership ===
In June 2024, Edwin Bautista, stepped down from his position as President and Chief Executive Officer (CEO) of UnionBank and was to be replaced by the bank's Senior Vice President, Ana Maria Aboitiz Delgado, beginning January 1, 2025.

== Subsidiaries and Affiliates ==
UnionBank is divided into the following subsidiaries and affiliates:

- Citicorp Financial Services and Insurance Brokerage Philippines Inc.
- CitySavings
- First Union Direct
- First Union Plans
- UBP Capital Corporation
- Union Properties
- UBX Philippines, Inc.
- UnionDigital Bank

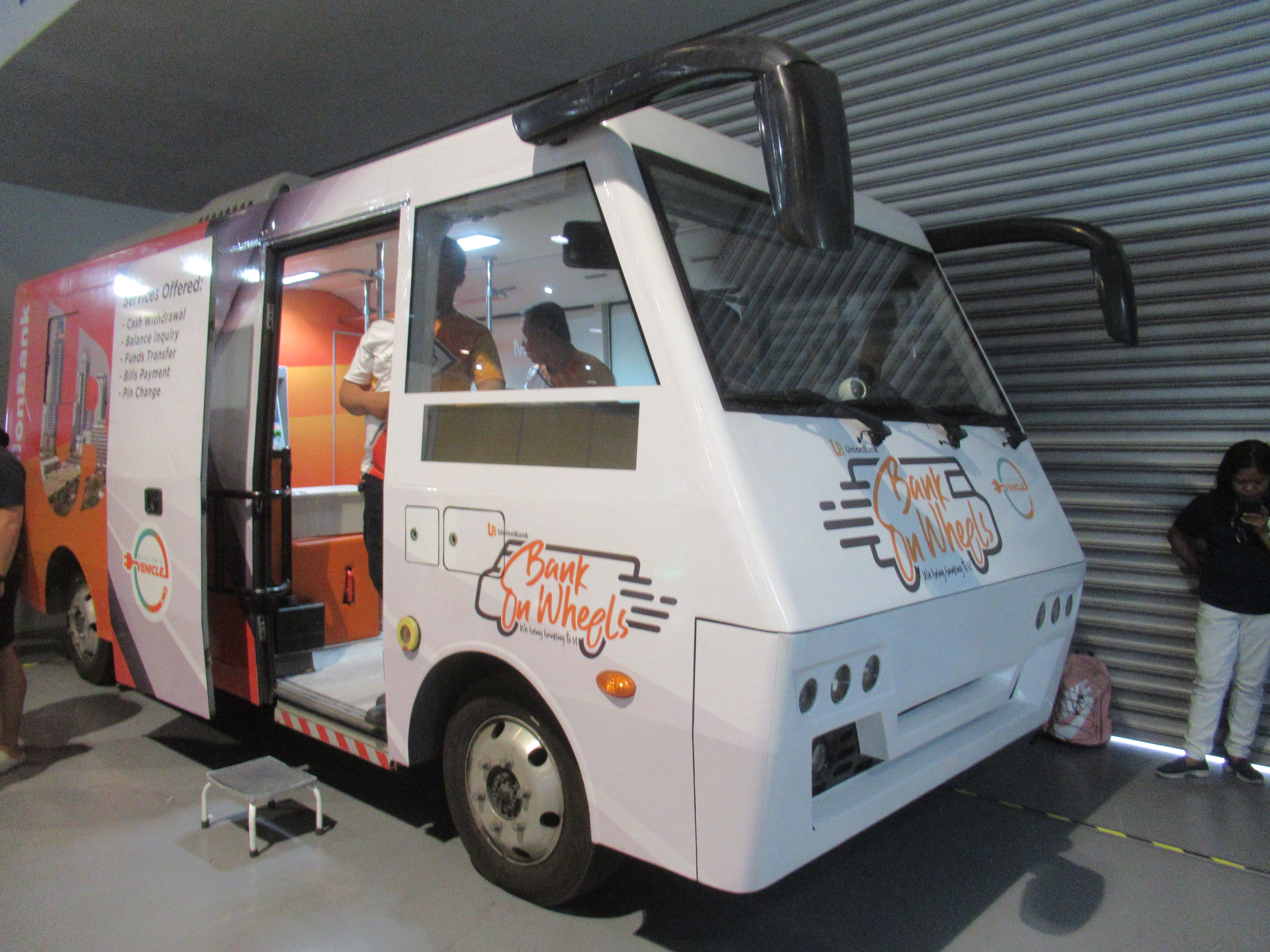
Bank on Wheels

== Ownership ==
- Aboitiz Equity Ventures: 49.31%
- Social Security System: 18.91%
- Insular Life Assurance Co., Ltd.: 16.32%
- Others: 15.46%

== See also ==
- Digital Banks in the Philippines
- International Exchange Bank
- Land Bank of the Philippines
- List of Philippine companies
- BancNet (the UnionBank ATM network)
