= Citibank Philippines =

Bank in the Philippines

- Company type: Subsidiary
- Industry: Banking
- Founded: July 1912; 113 years ago
- Headquarters: 34th Street, Bonifacio Global City, Taguig, Metro Manila, Philippines
- Key people: Paul Favila (Citi Philippines CEO)
- Parent: Citigroup
- Website: www.citigroup.com/global/about-us/global-presence/philippines

Citibank Philippines is the Philippines branch of Citibank. In July 1902, the International Banking Corporation, a predecessor to Citibank, opened its first branch in Manila. It was the largest commercial bank in the Philippines.

One of its largest investments in the country is the site building in Bonifacio Global City, Taguig.

Citi Philippines, including Citi Solutions Center (CSC) Manila, comprising Regional Operating Headquarters (ROHQ) and the Citigroup Business Process Solutions (CBPS), have around 7,000 employees.

Currently, Citi Philippines serves the public sector, top-tier local corporates, multinationals, and financial institutions through its Institutional Clients Group.

== History ==
In 2012, the bank installed an ATM in The Rockwell Center in Manila which dispenses US Dollars in addition to Pesos- becoming the first in the country to do so. This allows customers to withdraw cash or conduct transactions up to $3000 per day.

=== Exit of consumer banking operations and merger with UnionBank ===
In April 2021, Citigroup announced it would exit its consumer and retail banking operations in 13 markets, including Australia, Bahrain, China, India, Indonesia, South Korea, Malaysia, the Philippines, Poland, Russia, Taiwan, Thailand and Vietnam. However, Citibank Philippines continued its operations until the sale of the bank to the new local owners.

On December 23, 2021, Citigroup announced that Citigroup sold the company's consumer and retail banking business in the Philippines to Union Bank of the Philippines (UBP) for ₱ 55 billion, with the latter as the surviving entity of the said merger. The transaction included the bank’s credit card, personal loans, wealth management, and retail deposit businesses. The acquisition also included the bank’s real estate assets in Citibank Square in Eastwood, Quezon City, Metro Manila as well as three full service Citibank Philippines branches, five wealth centers and two bank branch lites. The deal also means UnionBank would absorb approximately Citibank Philippines' 1,750 local employees, including those in senior management roles, the deal is expected to close in the second half of 2022.

== Products and services ==
Treasury and Trade Solutions

Securities Services
