= Tonik (bank) =

Digital bank in the Philippines

Tonik Bank
- Industry: Financial services; Banking
- Founded: March 18, 2021; 5 years ago
- Headquarters: Pasig City, Philippines
- Key people: Grygorii Krasnov (Founder, Chairman, and CEO); Maria Lourdes Pineda (President and Country Manager - Philippines)
- Parent: Tonik Financial Pte Ltd
- Website: tonikbank.com

Tonik Digital Bank, Inc., commonly known as Tonik, is an all-digital bank which was launched in the Philippines in 2021, notable for being the first all-digital bank, or "neobank" in Southeast Asia. Its consumer products range from deposits, payments, debit cards, and loans. It operates with its own bank license issued by the Bangko Sentral ng Pilipinas (BSP), with deposits insured by the Philippine Deposit Insurance Corporation (PDIC). Its holding company is Singapore-based Tonik Financial Pte Ltd.

Tonik is backed by international investment groups Sequoia India, iGlobe Partners, Insignia Ventures, Point72 and Camerton Holdings. Other than Manila, the neobank operates out of three hubs based in Singapore, Kyiv, and Chennai.

== History ==
Tonik was founded in 2020 by serial entrepreneur Greg Krasnov at a time when the Bangko Sentral ng Pilipinas, the Philippines' central bank, was working to improve financial inclusion in the country. At the time, 70% of the Filipino population remained unbanked, but the rise of the COVID-19 pandemic in the Philippines and the resulting enhanced community quarantine in Luzon soon resulted in a boom in demand for financial services.

Tonik received its rural bank license from the BSP in December 2019 and launched a pilot test of its proprietary mobile app in the fourth quarter of 2020. Tonik formally launched to the Philippine market in March 2021, raking in PHP 1 billion (USD20M) in less than 1 month – a milestone which Tonik called "a historic record for any new bank launching in the country."

The following quarter, the bank secured USD 17 million for its Pre-Series B funding, further strengthening its position as one of the most funded fintechs in Southeast Asia with over USD 44M in total funding as of date. Tonik was issued an official digital bank license by the BSP in June 2021, becoming the first private neobank in the Philippines to do so. As of August 2021, Tonik has received PHP 3.5 billion (USD 68M) in customer deposits.

== Business press reactions ==
Tonik's 2021 entry into the Philippine market as the country's first digital-only bank sparked the attention of both the Philippine and international business press. Upon Tonik's commercial launch, for example, the Manila Bulletin and London-based magazine Financial IT both noted that Tonik's completely branchless way of banking was “set out to fundamentally disrupt the Filipino retail banking industry.”

Tonik’s offering of high-interest rates also gained the attention of the Philippine business press, with Philippine Daily Inquirer referring to the bank's rates as “staggering.”

The Philippine Star later noted that the neobank breached the PHP 1 billion in retail deposits mark very early by partnering with Globe myBusiness and aligning its launch with the financial inclusion efforts of the BSP.

Later in 2021, IBS intelligence named Tonik as one of their 5 Top FinTechs in the Philippines to watch out for in 2021, while the FinTech Times included Tonik in their spotlight of neobanks and the growth of new technology in Asia.

== See also ==
- Digital banks in the Philippines
- Neobank
