= Maya (financial services) =

Philippine financial services platform

- Founded: December 2000; 25 years ago
- Predecessors: Smart Money (2000–2016); PayMaya (2016–2022)
- Headquarters: 6/F Launchpad Center, TV5 Media Center Complex, Reliance corner Sheridan Streets, Barangay Buayang Bato, Mandaluyong, Philippines
- Area served: Philippines
- Key people: Manny Pangilinan (Chairman, Voyager Innovations; Chairman, Maya Philippines, Inc.; Chairman emeritus, Maya Bank, Inc.); Alfred Panlilio (Board member, Voyager Innovations and Maya Philippines, Inc.); Orlando B. Vea (CEO, Maya Group)
- Industry: Financial services; Mobile payment; Point of sale; Digital banking
- Parent: Voyager Innovations, Inc.
- Website: www.maya.ph

Maya, formerly known as PayMaya and Smart Money, is a Philippine financial services and digital payments platform based in Metro Manila, Philippines.

== History ==
The ancestral product/service, was launched in December 2000 as Smart Money powered by Smart e-Money, Inc., in cooperation with 1st e-Bank (formerly PDCP Bank; now merged into BDO Unibank) and Mastercard. It was claimed that it was the world's first card linked to a wireless phone and was marketed by Smart Communications as one of the biggest innovations in finance.

In January 2016, the service was rebranded as PayMaya and, in the first quarter of the same year, reached the milestone of having processed $1 billion worth of transactions. PayMaya reached 44 million registered users by the end of 2021.

In April 2022, PLDT (and a subsidiary Smart Communications), the majority owner and controller of PayMaya's parent company, Voyager Innovations, announced that PayMaya would be overhauled and renamed Maya, coinciding with the launch of Maya Bank. The said rebranding came to fruition on May 2, 2022.

In January 2025, a streaming network called BeetzePlay was introduced to be streamed only on Maya for short drama series on vertical mode and 2-3 minute runtimes similar to TikTok's video style with the same duration.

== Products ==
PayMaya logo from 2015 until 2021. The logo is still used in some Smart Padala outlets, and their store and bank partners, notably in their QR Code payment counters.

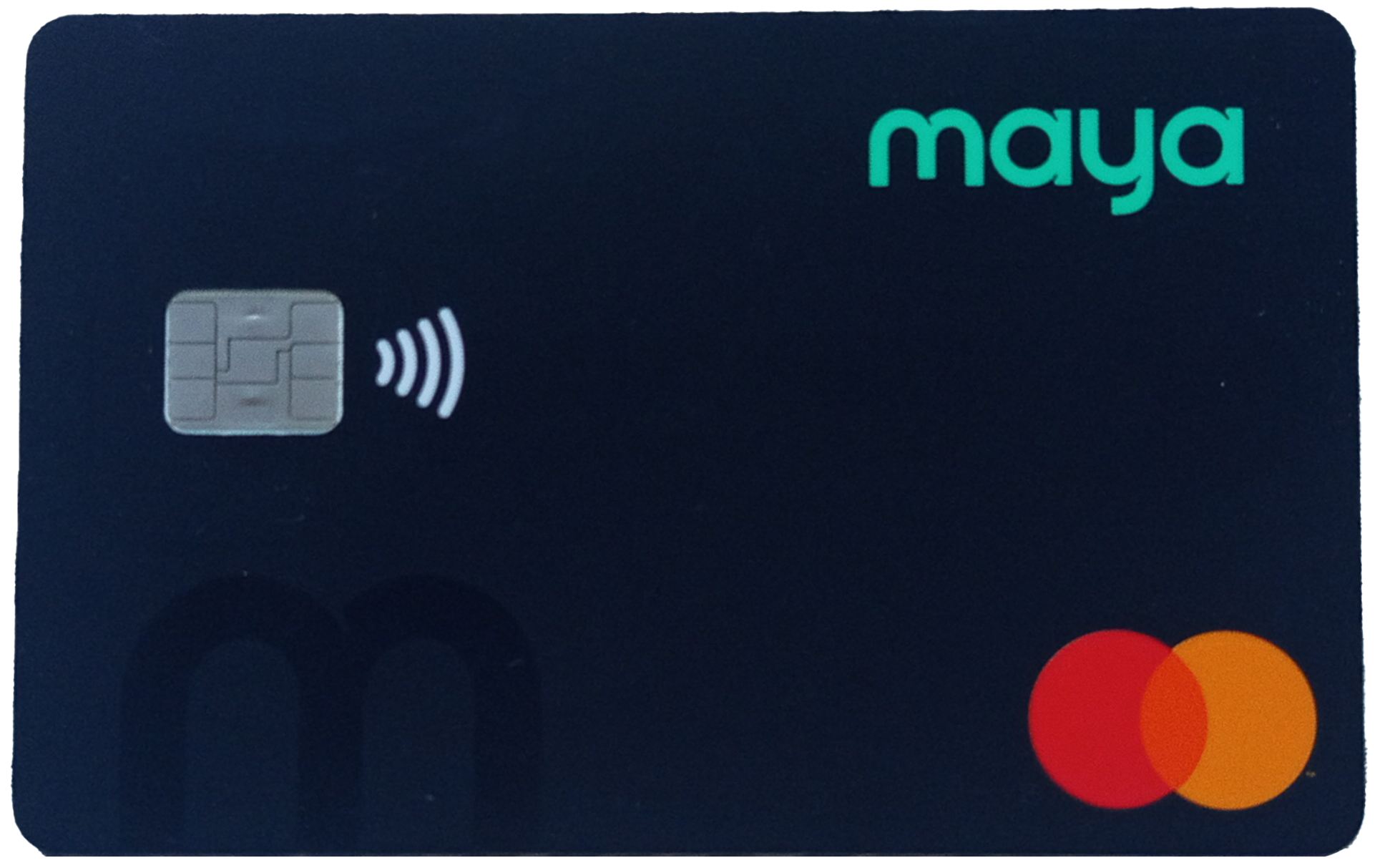
A Maya debit card powered by Mastercard

The features of the Maya app are offered by two legally distinct entities: Maya Philippines, Inc. (MPi, incorporated 2007), which offers Maya Wallet, Maya Business and Maya Center; and Maya Bank, Inc. (MBi, incorporated 2021), which offers Maya Savings and Maya Loans.

=== Maya Philippines, Inc. ===
Maya in its website bills MPi as the "country's only end-to-end digital payments company".

==== Maya Wallet ====
Maya Wallet, powered by MPi and commonly still referred to as PayMaya, allows money transfers between Maya users; send money to other local and international banks; pay recurring bills; purchase mobile and gaming prepaid credits; pay offline merchants by scanning unique QR codes; checkout from online stores using virtual or physical cards; and get insurance coverage for e-commerce purchases, personal health, and mobile devices.

Although most of the transactions processed by Maya Wallet are generally in fiat currency, it also lets users buy, sell, and soon send and receive cryptocurrencies such as Bitcoin, Ethereum, Cardano and Uniswap in its Crypto section.

As of June 2022, Maya Wallet reached 50 million registered users, making it the second most-used e-wallet service in the Philippines, only behind GCash. As of 2022, there were an estimated 58 million active e-wallet users in the Philippines, with this number expected to grow to 81 million by 2025.

==== Maya Business ====
Maya Business, powered by MPi and formerly known as PayMaya Enterprise, enables businesses to accept digital payments, whether online or in-store.

==== Maya Center ====
First introduced in 2004 as a separate remittance service of Smart Communications known as Smart Padala and eventually Smart Padala by PayMaya, Maya Center is a network of 55,000 partner agent touch points across the Philippines and serves as last-mile financial hubs in communities, providing the unbanked and underserved access to digital services.

=== Maya Bank, Inc. ===
==== Maya Savings ====
Maya Savings, powered by Maya Bank, Inc. (MBi), offers retail customers savings with an interest rate of 4.5 percent per annum. During its launch, Maya Savings gave an introductory interest rate of 6 percent per annum to early-bird registrants. When Liza Soberano, who previously endorsed GCash, was announced to be the newest celebrity endorser of Maya in February 2023, a promotional interest rate of 10% per annum was offered to qualified Maya Savings account holders.

In October 2022, MBi announced that it had 1 million registered customers and reached PHP10 billion deposits in just five months after its launch, positioning itself as the fastest-growing digital bank in the Philippines. It further cemented its place as the Philippines' # 1 Digital Bank when it announced hauling a deposit base of P25 billion from 2.3 million clients in August 2023. Maya holds a 61% market share of deposits, a 71% share of depositors, and a 46% share of deposit balances among the six digital banks operating in the country as of the first quarter of 2023.

==== Maya Loans ====
Maya Bank offers three types of loans under the umbrella of Maya Loans: Pay in 4, Flexi Loan, and Personal Loan. From April 2022 to June 2023, Maya Bank has lent more than P10 billion to its customers, making it one of the most active digital lenders in the Philippines.

Smart Padala by PayMaya rebranded to Maya Center in 2022, in accordance with the rebrand of PayMaya.

== Recognitions ==
=== Innovation ===
In 2021, PayMaya earned two awards from The Payment Association, namely, Leading Emerging Payments Organization Award and Most Innovative Mobile or Financial Service Payments Solution on the merits of PayMaya's commercial success and e-wallet offerings to retail consumers.

PayMaya Negosyo and PayMaya's in-app KYC process were recognized as Best in Future of Digital Innovations and Best in Future of Intelligence, correspondingly, at the 2021 "Future Enterprise Awards", presented by global market intelligence provider International Data Corporation. PayMaya's QR payments feature, on the other hand, was recognized as Best QR Payment at the 2021 Future Digital Awards for Fintech & Payments, organized by London-based global analyst firm Juniper Research.

Among 12,500 applicants and nominees, Maya was selected by CB Insights as one of the winners in the fifth iteration of its annual Fintech 250 ranking. Maya's parent company Voyager Innovations is one of the two Philippine-based fintech companies to enter this roster – the other being Tonik, a neobank – alongside Revolut, N26, Stripe, and Binance among others. The Maya app was also named among the world's most innovative apps for digital life at the 2023 Global Mobile Awards held in Barcelona.

Maya Bank was among the 415 banks that Forbes ranked in 2023 based on a global survey of 48,000 customers. The criteria included digital and customer services, financial advice, and user trust. Nine other Filipino banks made it to the list, including CIMB Bank Philippines, Philippine National Bank, and Bank of the Philippine Islands. The following year, in 2024, Maya was once again recognized by Forbes as one of the best banks based on a survey of 49,000 customers.

In August 2023, Maya Bank was also selected as the Best Digital Bank for Southeast Asia at the World Digital Bank (WDB) Awards. It was praised for its recent improvements and ranked as the eighth best global bank by The Digital Banker, the organizer of the WDB Awards. Maya joined other leading digital banks such as Starling Bank, Kokoabank and Revolut.

=== Privacy ===
Maya was recognized by the National Privacy Commission at the 2022 Privacy Awareness Week Awards for its efforts to build a secure financial ecosystem that caters to retail and enterprise customers. The two awards that it got were the Privacy Initiative of the Year for its #FraudPatrol campaign and Privacy Management of the Year for Maya Bank's data privacy practices.

=== Workplace ===
PayMaya was distinguished as the Best Talent Acquisition Team by LinkedIn during its 2021 Talent Awards in the Philippines. The organizers noted that PayMaya successfully leveraged the "10X talent" strategy, a term used in the book "Gamechangers" referring to transformative and agile talents, that allowed them to grow their organization at an unparalleled pace. In 2022, Maya was selected by LinkedIn as a finalist for its Talent Awards in categories such as talent acquisition, talent insights, learning, and diversity; and in 2023, LinkedIn named Maya as one of the Best Workplaces in the Philippines.
