= Television advertisements by country =

TV advertisements by country refers to how television advertisements vary in different countries and regions.

== Americas ==
=== Argentina ===
Commercial advertising in Argentine television (including cable channels operated from the country itself) is limited to 12 minutes per hour. In-programme advertising is allowed, but counted toward the 12-minute quota, means that if a 60-minute show has 2 minutes of in-programme advertising, the commercial breaks have to be limited to 10 minutes for that specific hour, otherwise the station might face a fine. Promos for future television programs are considered as an advertisement, and also counted within the quota. Argentine television channels used to be required to separate advertising from the rest of the programming using bumpers with the text "Espacio publicitario" ("Advertising space") from September 2010 to May 2016.

From March 2014, advertisements shown on Argentine television began to use the phrase "Aviso publicitario de producción nacional" (Advertisement for domestic product) and "Aviso publicitario de producción extranjera" (Advertisement for foreign product) for local and foreign advertisements, respectively. Also, advertisements for alcoholic products had the warning "Beber con moderación. Prohibida su venta a menores de 18 años" (Drink in moderation. Sales to persons under 18 prohibited). The warning was not used in alcohol advertising before 1997.

=== United States ===
Theater commercial about an electric refrigerator, in 1926

Around the Corner (1937)

In the United States, the Nielsen ratings system measures audience viewership of television programs, and provides a way for television broadcasters to determine how popular their television shows are, so that they can decide what rates to charge advertisers for air time.

For each hour in a broadcast day, advertisements take up a fairly large portion of the time. Commercial breaks have become longer over the decades. In the 1960s a typical hour-long American show would run for 51 minutes excluding advertisements. In 2013, a similar program would only be 42 minutes long; a typical 30-minute block of time now includes 22 minutes of programming and eight minutes of advertisements – six minutes for national advertising and two minutes for local.

In the early to mid-1960s, a television broadcast of the 101-minute film The Wizard of Oz (1939), for instance, would run for about 120 minutes with advertisements. In 2013, a telecast of the same film would run for between 150 and 180 minutes with advertisements. Because of this, it is common practice to edit films to fit within the time allotted.

Over the course of 10 hours, American viewers will be shown approximately three hours of advertisements, twice what they would have seen in the 1960s. If a 1960s show is rerun today, the content may be edited by nine minutes to make room for the extra advertisements.

In the 1950s and 1960s, the average advertisement's length was one minute. Starting in the early 1970s, the average length shrank to 30 seconds. The 15-second commercial began to appear in the late 1980s.

TV advertisements were coded for identification by broadcasters via an ISCI code. As of March 31, 2014, Ad-ID has been mandated as the standard method of identification for TV advertisements.

A special case of TV advertisements are rare or one-time events known as mega event advertising.

==== Popularity ====
In the United States, the TV advertisement is generally considered the most effective mass-market advertising format, and this is reflected by the high prices TV networks charge for commercial broadcasting airtime during popular TV events. The annual Super Bowl football game is known as much for its commercial advertisements as for the game itself, and the average cost of a single 30-second TV spot during this game (seen by 112 million viewers) has reached US$7 million (as of February 2022).

It has been suggested that, in general, television executives believe that advertisers covet the 18–49 age demographic and that older viewers are of almost no interest to most advertisers due to their unwillingness to change their buying habits. Products intended for older consumers, such as certain health products and insurance, are advertised regularly on television, generally during programming that appeals to older adults.

The number of viewers within the target demographic is more important to ad revenues than total viewers. According to Advertising Age, during the 2007–08 season, Grey's Anatomy was able to charge $419,000 per advertisement, compared to only $248,000 for an advertisement during CSI, despite CSI having almost five million more viewers on average. Due to its demographic strength, Friends was able to charge almost three times as much for an advertisement as Murder, She Wrote, even though the two series had similar total viewer numbers during the seasons they were on the air together. Broadcast networks are concerned by the increasing use of DVRs by younger viewers, resulting in aging of the live viewing audience and consequently, lower advertising rates. TV advertisers may also target certain audiences of the population such as certain races, and people of a certain income level or gender. In recent years, shows that tend to target young women tend to be more profitable for advertisements than shows targeted to younger men. This is due to the fact that younger men are watching TV less than their female counterparts.

In the United Kingdom, television advertising is considerably cheaper than in the United States. The current record for an advertising slot on British terrestrial television is quoted at being £250,000 for a 30-second slot during the 2010 series of Britain's Got Talent. However while British TV advertising is cheaper, this is only to be expected as the United Kingdom has a much lower population (63 million) compared to the U.S. (310 million). So if the £250,000 figure is adjusted into U.S. terms, the population being 5 times bigger and the exchange rate, this figure would become $2 million, much closer to the U.S. Super Bowl figure.

Because a single television advertisement can be broadcast repeatedly over weeks, months, and even years (the Tootsie Roll company has been broadcasting a well-known animated advertisement that asks "How many licks does it take to get to the tootsie center of a Tootsie Pop?" for over three decades), television advertisement production studios often spend very large amounts of money in the production of a single 30-second television spot. This significant expenditure has resulted in a number of high-quality advertisements with high production values, the latest in special effects technology, the most popular personalities, and the best music. A number of television advertisements are so elaborately produced that they can be considered short 30-second movies; indeed, many film directors have directed television advertisements both as a way to gain exposure and to earn a paycheck. One of film director Ridley Scott's most famous cinematic moments was a television advertisement he directed for the Apple Macintosh computer, that was broadcast in 1984. Although this advertisement was broadcast only once (aside from occasional appearances in television advertisement compilation specials and one 1 a.m. airing in Idaho a month before the Super Bowl so that the advertisement could be submitted for the 1983 Clio Awards), it has become famous and well-known, to the point where it is considered a classic television moment.

Despite the popularity of some advertisements, many consider them to be an annoyance for a number of reasons. The main reason may be that the loudness of advertisements tends to be higher (and in some cases much higher) than that of regular programming. The United States Congress passed a bill on September 30, 2010, called the CALM Act, to reduce the sound volume of advertisements, and loudness rules set by the FCC are effective as of December 13, 2012. In the UK, the Broadcast Committee of Advertising Practice has a similar regulation. The increasing number of advertisements, as well as overplaying of the same advertisement, are secondary annoyance factors. A third might be that television is currently the main medium to advertise, prompting advertising campaigns by everyone from cell-phone companies, political campaigns, fast food restaurants, to local businesses, and small businesses, prompting longer commercial breaks. Another reason is that advertisements often cut into certain parts in the regular programming that are either climaxes of the plot or a major turning point in the show, which many people find exciting or entertaining to watch.

==== Restrictions ====
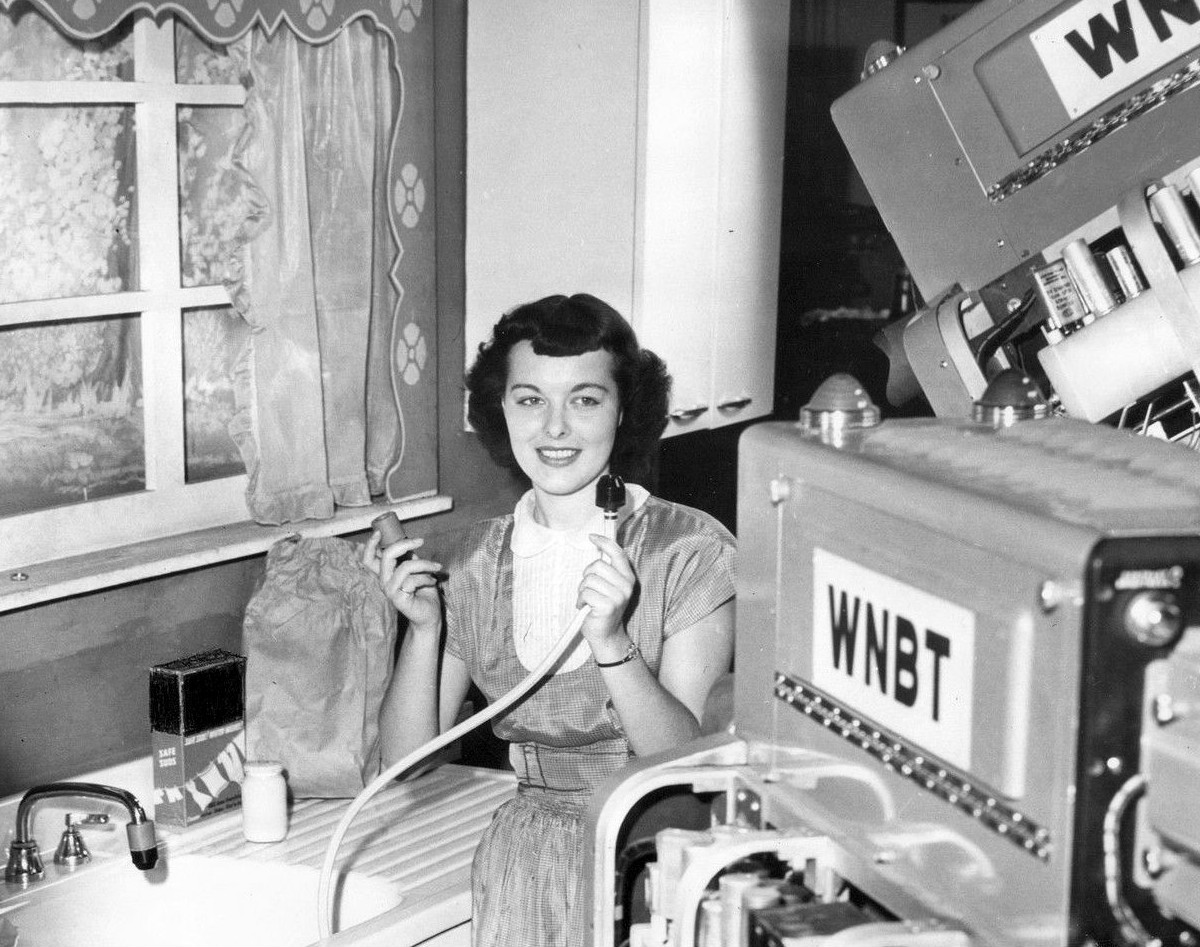
Television commercial in 1948

Beginning on January 2, 1971, advertisements featuring cigarettes were banned from American TV. Advertisements for alcohol products are allowed, but the consumption of any alcohol product is not allowed in a television advertisement (for example, an actor in a beer commercial cannot be shown actually drinking the beer). The Federal Trade Commission (FTC) and the Federal Communications Commission (FCC) have laid out regulations for television advertising, outlining restrictions on certain products, content, and claims, in addition to mandating minimum technical standards. Additional content standards are set by individual television broadcast entities to accommodate local laws, community standards, and their particular audience demographic; these broadcast outlets examine each incoming advertisement through a process known as "clearance."

Manufacturers of liquor products also adopted a voluntary code not to advertise on radio and television, which is particularly aimed at avoiding exposure of liquor advertisements to children. When companies dropped this ban, federal regulators appealed to the industry to reinstate code while the Federal Communications Commission (FCC) was also asked to look into potential restrictions on liquor advertisements on television. This was the case because, under the Communications Act, this agency has the power to regulate broadcasting as "public convenience, interest, or necessity requires." Aside from the FCC, the Federal Trade Commission (FTC) also has the authority to regulate television advertising in instances of "unfair methods of competition in or affecting commerce." The passage of the 1990 Children's Television Act (CTA), restricted the length of advertising in children's television programming to 10.5 minutes per hour on weekends and 12 minutes per hour on weekdays.

==== Advertisements as programming ====
Since the 1960s, media critics have claimed that the boundaries between "programming" and "advertisements" have been eroded to the point where the line is blurred nearly as much as it was during the beginnings of the medium, when almost all individual television shows were sponsored entirely by a single corporation (the model which was carried over from old-time network radio). For much of the 1970s, 1980s, and 1990s, the FCC imposed a rule requiring networks that broadcast programming on Saturday morning and Sunday nights at 7 p.m./6 p.m. Central to air bumpers ("We'll return after these messages...", "...now back to our programming" and variations thereof) to help younger audiences distinguish programs from advertisements. The only programs that were exempt from this rule were news shows and information shows relating to news (such as 60 Minutes). Conditions on children's programming have relaxed to an extent since the period of the 1970s and 1980s.

== Europe ==
In many European countries, television advertisements appear in longer, but less frequent advertising breaks. For example, instead of 3 minutes every 8 minutes, there might be around 6 minutes every half-hour. European Union legislation limits the time taken by commercial breaks to 12 minutes per hour (20%), with a minimum segment length of 20 or 30 minutes, depending on the programme content. Live imported telecasts with shorter segments, such as U.S. sporting events, replace the original ads with promotional material. Advertising broadcast time can vary within the EU and other countries and between networks depending on local policy. Unlike in the United States, in Europe the advertising agency name may appear at the beginning or at the end of the advert.

=== Croatia ===
In Croatia, the commercial broadcasters may show up to 12 minutes of advertising per hour, while the public broadcaster HRT, being partially funded by a license fee, shows less advertising and normally does not interrupt series and films. Tobacco advertising is banned but alcohol and non-prescription medications can be advertised on TV. Political advertisements are allowed only in the short official campaign period before an election and only in separate blocks from other advertisements.

=== Czechia ===
Like Greece, Russia. On 1 January 2026, Czechia is one of the few countries where the TV Nova, ČT, TV Prima television channel's logo is retained during the commercial break.

=== Denmark ===
The Danish DR-networks are funded by a television licence, so they do not show any advertisements. The other Danish television network, TV2 shows advertisements only in blocks between the programs. These can take from 2 minutes to 10 minutes depending on the time to the next show. In Denmark, commercial breaks are strictly taboo and advertising targeted to children is restricted. Networks like Kanal 5 and TV3 are allowed to interrupt programs, as these networks are being broadcast via satellite from the United Kingdom.

=== Finland ===
In Finland, there are three mainstream non-commercial networks run by the state-owned broadcasting company YLE, that run advertisements only on their own programs. The three main commercial networks MTV3, Sub (a subsidiary of MTV3), and Nelonen, all run their advertisements during breaks approximately every 15 minutes. Since digital TV has been introduced, the number of TV channels has expanded, with YLE and the main broadcasters all adding new channels (including some subscription channels). Analogue broadcasts ceased in August 2007 and the nation's TV services are now exclusively digital. A typical break lasts about 4 minutes. The length of individual advertisements can vary from a few seconds (7, 10, and 15 are common), and they are currently rarely over one minute in length. Most advertisements of supranational companies are commonly dubbed from English language advertisements. Although Swedish is the other official language of Finland, the advertisements do not feature Swedish subtitles nor are any Swedish language advertisements shown with the infrequent exception of some political advertisements at the time of elections.

=== France ===
The ARCOM allows up to 9 minutes of advertising per hour on average in a day, and 12 minutes in an hour. Private networks can only broadcast one commercial break if the show is less than an hour and two commercial breaks if the show is more than an hour. For public networks, advertising is allowed up to 6 minutes per hour on average, and forbidden after 8 pm.

=== Germany ===
As in Britain, in Germany, public television stations own a major share of the market. Their programming is funded by a licence fee as well as advertisements on specific hours of the day (20 minutes per day; not after 8 pm), except on Sundays and holidays. Private stations are allowed to show up to 12 minutes of advertisements per hour with a minimum of 20 minutes of programming in between interruptions.

=== Greece ===
In Greece, where most television stations and networks do not remove their logo before a commercial break, it is mandatory for public and commercial TV stations to separate the advertisements from the rest of the program with each station's ident. Subliminal advertising, tobacco and medication advertisements are banned. Most programmes (series, documentaries, etc.) can have one commercial break every 20 minutes. Advertisements must not exceed 15% of the broadcasting day or 20% if there are direct advertisements for buying or renting products (like informercials). A commercial break must not exceed the length of 4 minutes with the exceptions of movies/telefilms with the length exceeding the 45 minutes, which can have one commercial break for 9 minutes and of the movies/telefilms that exceed the length of 110 minutes which can have more than one commercial break every 45 minutes for 9 minutes.

=== Ireland ===
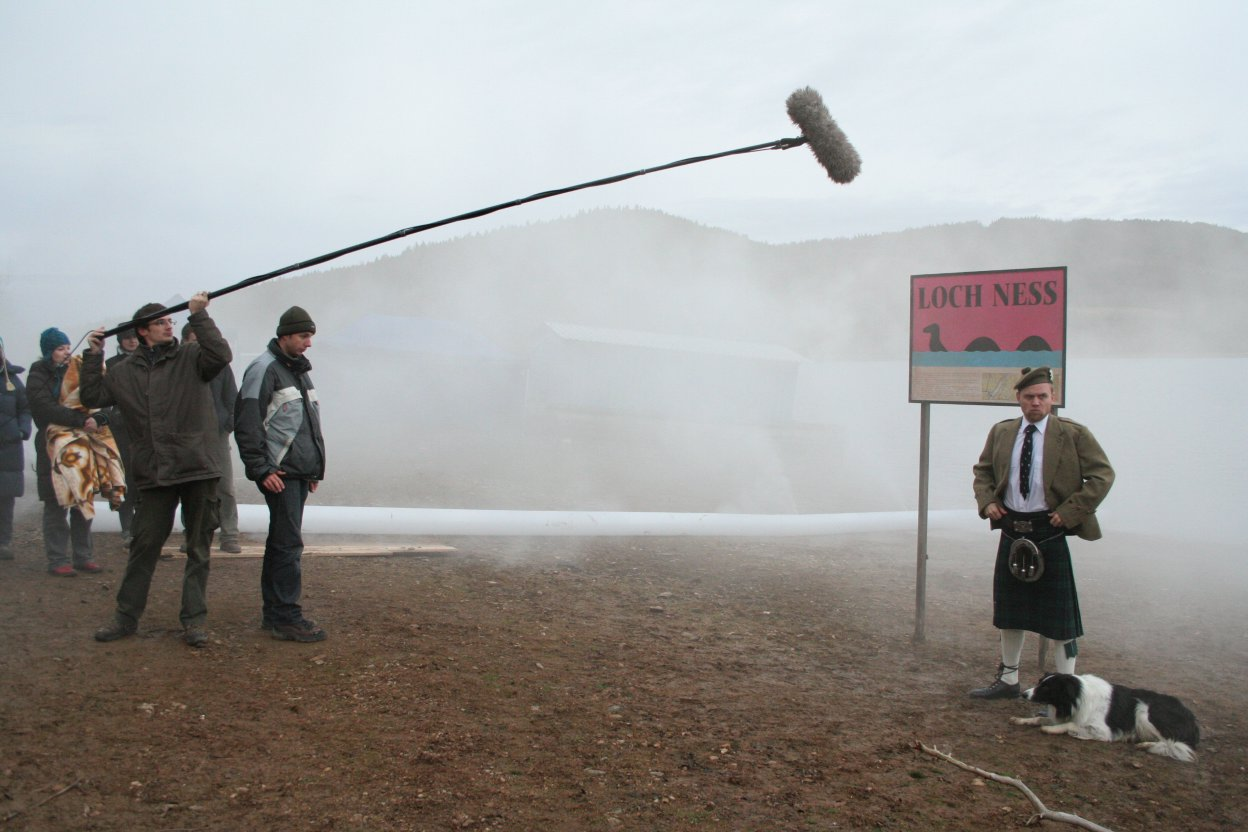
Filming a movie ad

In Ireland, the Broadcasting Authority of Ireland determines the number of adverts on commercial and community TV stations, while the Minister for Communications, Energy and Natural Resources is responsible for the advertising limits of Public Service Broadcasters on TV and Radio, and commercial radio advertising is governed through statute.

Commercial Broadcasters may not exceed 18% of their broadcast day on advertising and they may only have a maximum of 12 minutes of adverts per hour, except for children's programming where advertising may not exceed 10 minutes per hour (commercial TV broadcasters includes Virgin Media TV). Irish community TV channels rarely show advertising; however, they are permitted to show 6 minutes of advertising per hour.

RTÉ TV and Radio carry a maximum of 9 minutes per hour of advertising, but only an average of 6 minutes of advertising per hour, and the same rules apply to TG4: this amounts to 10% of total broadcast time. On television, RTÉ cannot carry advertising on RTÉ News Now and RTÉjr; they do not carry advertising on programming for the under 6s, RnaG or their Digital Radio services.

==== History ====
Until 2010 commercial broadcasters were permitted a maximum of 15% advertising time vs. overall broadcast time. In 2010, TV3 (now Virgin Media TV) asked for an increase in advertising minutes due to the high level of competition from advertising opt-outs coming into Ireland via satellite and cable pay providers, and also the number of live ITV programmes carried by TV3 (such as The X Factor). The BAI agreed to increase the number of ads on commercial TV broadcasts to bring Irish commercial TV channels into line with UK commercial TV channels. The Independent Broadcasters of Ireland (IBI) and the National Newspapers of Ireland (NNI) opposed this change. The IBI argued that there was no demand for an extension of TV advertisements and it would hurt radio broadcasters. The NNI argued that the change would give the independent broadcasters an unfair advantage over newspapers.

To mark World Television Day, on November 21, 2017, a number of old television adverts from the Irish Film Archive were broadcast on RTÉ One following the Six One News and the Nine O'Clock News.

In 2024 more brands advertisements older adverts will be displayed at Irish Film Archive. (1961-March 6, 1985) restored on Film.

=== Italy ===
Until the 1980s, Italian television and broadcasters in other European countries did not do any commercial advertisement during films, soap operas, TV series and documentaries. Usually, publicity intervals had a duration limited from 5 to 10 minutes and hidden publicity was categorically forbidden from being included in established TV timetables.

Then commercial TV, namely the Mediaset group founded by Silvio Berlusconi, introduced in Italy a model of propaganda that was diffused by some decades before in North American countries. It consisted of short spots directly focused on attracting the consumer in the shortest possible time. The same modality was suddenly copied by public television. In recent years, the fragmentation of the audience across an increasing number of media has profoundly revolutionized advertising strategies. Companies' goal has become finding an effective way to adapt the same message across different media without compromising its effectiveness. In Italy, simple and entertaining TV commercials continue to be successful, such as the series created by Mulino Bianco, featuring actor Antonio Banderas as a miller forced to interact with a chicken.

=== Norway ===
Television advertising is regulated by the Broadcasting Act. Public service broadcaster NRK is tax-funded, and cannot carry advertising, however, sponsorship of programs (typically sport events) is allowed. Commercial channels may interrupt television programmes with ads, but certain conditions apply. The maximum amount of advertising is 15% per hour (09 min). The nation's second-most-watched channel – TV2 – is funded by television advertisements. Norwegian-language programmes broadcast from abroad – such as TV3 Norway broadcasting from the United Kingdom in the Norwegian language – must comply to British regulations. Political TV advertisements are strictly prohibited, as are all advertisements for tobacco and alcohol. TV advertisements are monitored by the Norwegian Media Authority (Medietilsynet).

=== Poland ===
In Poland, the national public broadcaster, Telewizja Polska, is partially funded by a licence fee. Advertising breaks on public television can be broadcast only between programmes, except for live events (mostly sport) that contain breaks which can be interrupted. Commercial broadcasters can interrupt programmes for advertising, but some networks (like e.g. Canal+) broadcast their programmes uninterrupted. Furthermore, all programmes featuring sponsor's names or products are required to announce it by a short label at the beginning and end of the programme. Tobacco and alcohol adverts are banned under the Health Protection Against the Consequences of Tobacco Use and Tobacco Articles Act of 9 November 1995, and Education in Sobriety and Counteracting Alcoholism Act of 26 October 1982, but adverts for beer, although restricted, can be shown between 20:00h and 06:00h. Any drug ads are allowed, but, since January 2023, they changed notice to "To jest lek. Dla bezpieczeństwa, stosuj go z ulotką dołączoną do opakowania tylko wtedy, gdy jest to konieczne. W przypadku wątpliwości skonsultuj się z lekarzem lub farmaceutą", meaning: "This is a drug. For safety, use it with label attached to package only when necessary. In case of necessity, consult with doctor or pharmacist". By agreement, less-nutritious food ads have been banned since 1 January 2015 on children's networks such as MiniMini+, TVP ABC and Nickelodeon and on other programming aimed at children but has been criticised for raising TV rating on nationwide general TV channels for animated films aimed to children as well as family films (mainly on TVN and Polsat) as well as in talent show programmes involving children (e.g. The Voice Kids of TVP2 or Mali giganci) to +12 in order to avoid restrictions on unhealthy foods by making it more appealing for advertisers. Since 1 April 2017, bookmaker advertisements became restricted under amended Gambling Act of 19 November 2009 which cannot be broadcast between 06:00h and 22:00h (except for sports broadcasting) and during childhood and youth programming.

=== Russia ===
The Russian advertising break consists of 2 parts: federal adverts and regional adverts. The duration for each is 4 minutes and 15 minutes per hour respectively. Like Greece, Russia is one of the few countries where the television channel's logo is retained during the commercial break. In Russia, tobacco advertising is prohibited, and in 2013, this was followed by alcohol and medication advertising.

During the Soviet era, advertising was decreed non-existent, and instead, airtime was occupied by propaganda materials.

=== United Kingdom ===
In the UK, the BBC is funded by a licence fee and does not air adverts.

ITV in 1955 was the first commercial channel. On the commercial channels, the amount of airtime allowed by the British broadcasting regulator Ofcom for advertising is an overall average of 7 minutes per hour, with limits of 12 minutes for any particular clock hour (8 minutes per hour between 6 pm and 11 pm). With 42-minute U.S. exports to Britain, such as Lost, being given a one-hour slot, nearly one-third of the slot is taken up by adverts or trailers for other programmes. Live imported television programmes such as WWE Raw show promotional material in place of U.S. advert breaks.

The first advert to be shown in the history of ITV was an advert for S.R. Toothpaste on 22 September 1955. Early television commercials were staid adaptations of newspaper advertisements. The British industry was unfamiliar with the format, but also did not want to seem too Americanized. Infomercials (known as "admags") were banned in 1963.

On 1 July 2000, TV broadcasters began requiring commercials to be delivered to them in widescreen, an event referred to as C-Day in industry promotion of the change.

In 2008, Ofcom announced a review of television advertising and teleshopping regulations, with a view to possibly changing their code, Rules on the Amount and Distribution of Advertising (RADA), which regulates the duration, frequency and restriction of adverts on television.

Television advertising specialist, Nick Illston, of advertising-buying agency Pace Media, explained that ITV's £250,000 asking price for a 30-second slot during the 2010 series of Britain's Got Talent was, at the time, the most expensive advertising slot on television.

£5.28 billion was invested in TV advertising in 2016 and, including on-demand viewing, commercial TV reached 91.9% of the UK every week, which means the average broadcast TV ad campaign got 237 million views.

Paid for political advertising is banned on television in the United Kingdom. Instead parties are given a free Party political broadcast at the time of an election.

== Asia ==
Depending on its style, system and other factors while in the process of broadcasting commercial breaks and TV advertisements, some officials (like government, associations, institutions, etc.) regulate and monitor the assets and broadcasting TV advertisements based on international standards.

=== India ===
In India, the Code for Self-Regulation of Advertising in India, established by the Advertising Standards Council of India (ASCI), is applicable on Television Commercials (TVCs). If consumers see an advertisement which they consider misleading or offensive, they can write to ASCI. As per the provisions under The Cable Television Networks (Regulation) Act of 1995, and the Policy Guidelines for Uplinking of Television Channels from India (first introduced in 2000), give the government the power to block the transmission and re-transmission of any channel in the country. Telecom Regulatory Authority of India has clear guidelines for TV advertising in India.

The Indian television channels are widely divided through Broadcast television, Cable television, Satellite television, Internet Protocol television. There are 857 permitted private satellite stations and also 190 government channels under the list of television stations in India. The TV advertising rate varies for TV ad spots, regional/national channels, prime/non-prime time and also on the media planning platform.

The Advertising Standards Council of India has defined the principles and guidelines for individuals, corporate bodies and associations engaged in or otherwise concerned with the practice of advertising for medium such as television. The principles include honest representations, non-offensive to public, against harmful products/situations, fair in competition. The guidelines include Automotives & Safety, Educational Institutions, Foods & Beverages, Disclaimers in an Advertisement.

=== Indonesia ===
Television advertisements in Indonesia currently based on Act No. 32 of 2002 on Broadcasting and regulated by Indonesian Broadcasting Commission (KPI). All advertisements must pass the censorship criteria set by the Film Censorship Board (LSF) before airing. Commercial breaks in Indonesia can occur elsewhere during the programme, usually 3 until 6 minutes, but breaks per hour are limited to 20%. Some TV networks also airs commercial breaks from the end of the programme, until the start of the upcoming programme. All national TV networks in Indonesia change their logo to transparent and light gray-colored during commercial breaks, although some like TVRI retains its transparent logo, and not all local TV channels follows this practice.

Television advertisements began airing on TVRI on 1 March 1963, about half a year after its first broadcast. The New Order government officially banned television advertisements on the channel starting April 1981, effectively ceased television advertisements in Indonesia as TVRI was the only television network at the time. However, as the private television stations emerged in the late 1980s and 1990s they were allowed to air commercials, while TVRI could not be allowed to broadcast advertisements until Act No. 32 of 2002 is in force.

According to the act, advertising time is limited to both public broadcasters (i.e. TVRI and local public broadcasters) and commercial private broadcasters. While received funding from state or local budgets, public broadcasters are allowed to run advertisements to a maximum of 15% of their broadcast time. In contrast, public service announcements (PSAs) for a minimum of 30% of its advertising time should be air. Commercial broadcasters could run advertisements to a maximum of 20% of their broadcast time, while they should air a minimum of 10% of advertising time for PSAs.

Unlike rest of the world, cigarette advertisements are still allowed between 21:30–05:00 local time, but are prohibited from demonstrating the appearance of cigarettes and smoking activities. Any cigarette advertisements must show warnings shown on their cigarette packs, as of October 2026 the warning was Peringatan: Karena merokok, saya terkena kanker tenggorokan (Warning: Due to smoking, I suffered throat cancer), although there are several warnings other than shown above that actually not used by cigarette advertisements. Similarly, advertisements featuring condoms are only allowed between 22:00–03:00 local time.

Any advertisements featuring liquor are banned, but its outdoor counterparts may still exist as part of traffic safety public service advertisements. SMS-based premium content service advertisements (also called bintang pagar and reg spasi advertisements in Indonesian), while it was common in late 2000s, are also banned since October 2011.

=== Japan ===
In Japan, TV advertisements are called "Commercial Messages" or CMs. There are all kinds of advertisements, one is called the "Cow-catcher" where the advertisements are shown before the start of a programme, the "Hitch-hiking" type where the commercials are shown after the end of the programme, and the "Spot CM" are the commercials being shown on commercial breaks.

There are regulations for example: commercials for pachinko parlours are banned from being shown from 5 am to 9 am, and from 5 pm to 8 pm. Tobacco advertisements were banned since April 1998. Alcohol commercials are banned from being shown from 5 am to 6 pm so underage drinking can be avoided.

=== Malaysia ===
In Malaysia, a government department monitors television advertisements rather than a private institution. Almost all television stations and networks in the country, whether government-owned, private or pay-TV networks, broadcast advertisements, with television network logos removed before the start of the commercial break.

There are usually two commercial breaks in a half-hour programme and three commercial breaks in an hour-long programme, with the exception of news programmes. Terrestrial television can only broadcast advertisements during the programme that was currently aired except before announcing the breaking of fast in the month of Ramadan, although advertisements may be included during CJ Wow Shop on Media Prima television networks such as NTV7 and TV9 as of June 2016.

Because Malaysian television advertisements were controlled by the government department, the Malaysian TV advertising permit number appears during the first few seconds of any advertisement. The abbreviation at the first part of the permit number which refers to the ministry which handles the TV advertising permit number always changes sometime after the Malaysian government made a new portfolio of ministers and name changes to some bureaus after the general election. The usage of advertising code began in 1995, with KP/YYYY/XXXX of which KP means Ministry of Information, YYYY is the year the advertisement produced and the XXXX is the number of the advert permit. This was replaced by KPKK (Ministry of Information, Communications and Culture) and KKMM (Ministry of Communications and Multimedia of Malaysia) in 2009 and 2013, respectively. The usage of advertising code has declined in recent years, although it remains in use in almost all advertisements shown on RTM. Other advertising permits includes the KKLIU (Ministry of Health, the Medicine Advertising Authority) for medicinal advertisements, which was used before 1995 and the JIRP (Pesticide Advertising Department) for pesticide advertisements. All pesticide advertisements must show the words "INI IKLAN RACUN MAKHLUK PEROSAK" (This is a pesticide advertisement, previously INI ADALAH IKLAN RACUN PEROSAK) and JIRP advertising code at the beginning of the advertisement and the words "BACA LABEL SEBELUM GUNA" (Read the label before use, previously BACALAH LABEL KELUARAN SEBELUM MENGGUNAKANNYA) at the end of the advertisement. It was also used in advertisements on newspapers and magazines.

Astro is also known to delay incoming satellite feeds by two to five minutes (some channels delay by one hour) from the actual time of the start and the end of programme (for example a programme aired at 13:30 will be started at 13:33) with broadcasting advertisements during in-between programmes for its purpose of commercial replacement, as government laws forbid advertisements produced from overseas, with exceptions such as film trailers (since release dates may include more than one country).

Liquor advertisements shown after 22:00 during non-Malay programmes have been banned in the country since 1995, while cigarette advertisements were banned from showing cigarette packaging in 1995, and were banned entirely in 2003. Fast-food advertisements during children's programmes were also banned in 2007. There are also restrictions on Malaysian television regarding advertisements for 18-rated films, women's sanitary products and unhealthy foods which must not be broadcast during children's programmes, and lottery advertising, which is prohibited during Malay programmes. Lingerie advertisements are prohibited on Malaysian television, but allowed in non-Malay magazines published in Malaysia. Also, promotion of television programmes for sponsored programmes are treated separately from programme promotions, though some networks had the sponsor name being advertised in programme promos.

=== Philippines ===
The Philippines advertising industry is self-regulated. The Philippine advertising industry adopted an Advertising Code of Ethics essentially to promote efficiency in processing applications and resolution of cases and avoid costly litigation in regular courts. The earliest Advertising Code of Ethics dates back to the Philippine Board of Advertising (PBA) established in 1974. In 1989, the PBA was renamed Advertising Board of the Philippines (ADBOARD) and was mandated by the Implementing Rules and Regulations of R.A. 7394 or The Consumer Protection Act to ensure that all advertising materials conform to its Code of Ethics. The ADBOARD Advertising Content & Regulations Committee (ACRC) had been the main implementing arm of advertising self-regulation in the Philippines until March 31, 2008, when the Ad Standards Council (ASC) took over this function. The Association of Broadcasters of the Philippines, a self-regulatory organization representing most television and radio broadcasters in the country, limit advertising to 18 minutes per hour, a move taken to help "promote public interest."

In this case some TV broadcasters have to remove network logos (like ABS-CBN/A2Z/ALLTV/Kapamilya Channel, TV5 & GMA) before starting a commercial break. Also, all commercial product advertisements will start (right after most TV shows will break) before or after TV network ads. Some TV commercials to be aired require ASC clearance if the content has trivial facts and testimonies.

Since television was introduced to the Philippines in 1953, they used imported TV advertisements until 1960, the same way in which they used billboard advertisements during the U.S. period. In 1960, P&G paved the way to start the first local TV advertisement.

In 1966, when the Philippine TV turned from black-and-white to colour, Colgate-Palmolive was the first to advertise in colour.

Some ads have any of the following notices indicated either during or at the end of the commercial depending on the type of product.

- "ASC Reference Code (number of reference code)". for various advertisements.
- "For 18/21 years (old) and above only. Drink Responsibly" (formerly "Drink Moderately") for alcoholic beverages.
- "Per SEC Registration No. (number of code). Certificate of Authority (number of certificates). Refer to loan applications, study the terms and conditions/ALWAYS READ THE TERMS AND CONDITIONS BEFORE APPLYING FOR A LOAN. for various loan advertisements.
- "Deposits are Insured by PDIC Up to ₱ 1,000,000 per depositor." (Formerly "Member: BancNet (formerly MegaLink)/Expressnet and PDIC (or vice versa). Maximum deposit insurance for each depositor ₱ 500,000), PANA: Truth in Advertising" and "Regulated/supervised by the Bangko Sentral ng Pilipinas and Securities and Exchange Commission" for banks and other financial firms.
- "The financial products of (name of insurance company) are not insured by Philippine Deposit Insurance Corporation and are not guaranteed by (name of bank)." for bancassurance advertisements.
- "GOVERNMENT WARNING: CIGARETTE SMOKING IS DANGEROUS TO YOUR HEALTH." (Chinese: 政府忠告市民：吸煙危害健康) (formerly "Government Warning: Cigarette smoking is hazardous to your health" from 1 July 1955 to 31 December 1973 and "Government Warning: Cigarette smoking is hazardous to health" (Note: Although the entirety of the Hong Kong English cigarette TV ads flashes the warning advisory "Government Warning: Cigarette smoking is hazardous to health", then the voice-over warning advisory "Cigarette smoking is hazardous to health" at the end of the commercial of any cigarette brand from November 13, 1987 to November 30, 1990 in Hong Kong and November 13, 1987 to March 31, 1993 in the Philippines, Singapore, Malaysia and Brunei.) from 1 January 1974 to 31 March 1993) for tobacco products (radio and television advertising of cigarette and hand-rolling tobacco is banned since 1 January 2007 in accordance with Section 22 of Republic Act 9211 or the Tobacco Regulation Act of 2003)
- "MAHALAGANG PAALALA: ANG (name of product) AY HINDI GAMOT AT HINDI DAPAT GAMITING PANGGAMOT SA ANUMANG URI NG SAKIT." (formerly "NO APPROVED THERAPEUTIC CLAIMS" & "No approved therapeutic claim") for food, dietary, fiber and herbal supplements.
- "(Name of the generics)" is the generic name of (name of the product), "If symptoms persist, consult your doctor/physician." for over-the-counter medicines.
- "This is a paid advertisement."/"Political advertisement paid for and by (politician/supporter/political party), (address)." for political ads.
- "The use of milk supplements must only be upon the advice of a health professional. The unnecessary and improper use of this product may be dangerous to your child's health." (formerly "Breastmilk is still best for babies", "Breastmilk is best for babies up to 2 years", "Breastmilk is the best for babies up to 2 years" and ("Breastmilk is the best for babies up to 2 years of age and beyond.") for infant formulas (now milk supplements). Used in conjunction with the DOH-IAC permit number.
- "This product is not intended for babies 6 months of age and below". for food/infant devices that are targeted to 6 months old and above.
- "DSWD SB-SP (number of permits), (year). Valid from (start of promotion date) to/until (end of promotion date), Nationwide" for the organization (2018–Present).
- "Terms and Conditions Apply" for banks, airlines, and more promos
- "Promo (duration) is from (start of promotion date) to/until (end of promotion date). Per (DTI-NCR/FTEB/Fair Trade/region/area code/DOH-FDA CCRR/CDRR/CFRR/CCHUHSRR/CPRR/DA-NMIS) Permit Number (number of permit), Series of (year)/(year) (2018-2019). See posters and print ads for (complete/complain) details" for promos.
- "For 21 years (old) and above only. Gambling can be Addictive. Know when to stop. (formerly Game/Play Responsibly, Keep It Fun)" for games supervised by either PAGCOR or PCSO.
- "HLURB/DHSUD LTS No.: (number of development license). DATE of ISSUE: (date)". for condominiums/real estate developers.

=== South Korea ===
In South Korea, a television advertisement is called a CF, an abbreviation for "commercial film".

Under the current rules, terrestrial networks cannot take in-programme commercial breaks. So, the advertisements are usually put between the intro and the start of a programme, and between the end credits and the end of the programme. Terrestrial networks often divide some longer-length films like The Ten Commandments into parts and consider each part as an individual programme. Terrestrial networks can take commercial breaks during breaks in action during sports events.

Pay-TV networks can take in-programme commercial breaks, although some pay-TV networks schedule advertisements in the same way that terrestrial networks do. Regulations for advertisements on terrestrial networks are more strict than those for pay networks. Non-South Korean networks are not subject to these regulations. Tobacco advertisements are prohibited. In recent years, advertisements focusing on corporate social responsibility, with a documentary-like but very short format, have also started to spread. An example is the recent Samsung campaign on CNN, which includes a series of spots, including one produced by ORBIS Production, about microplastics in the ocean, starring Italian marine biologist Martina Capriotti.

== Oceania ==
=== Australia ===
Similar to the European Union, advertising on Australian commercial television is restricted to a certain amount in a 24-hour period, but there are no restrictions on how much advertising may appear in any particular hour. Australian television has one of the highest proportions of advertising content in the world. Currently, in nighttime on Seven and Nine's primary networks there can be 686 minutes or more of heavy advertising (inc. local news updates) per day. During live sports broadcasts, individual commercial breaks last for 30 seconds instead of 3–5 minutes. Furthermore, product advertisements with informational content are labeled "public service announcements" and not included in the time restrictions; similarly with sponsorship announcements, and station identifications. Consequently, there may be less than 40 minutes of actual programme time per hour. Foreign, all television programmes and films are noticeably cut, re-edited for digital channels; comedy shows often return from an ad break into laughter, for instance. Australia is also one of the few countries in the world where advertisements may appear prior to, and over the top of, the closing credits of a programme.

There are some restrictions on television advertising in Australia, such as a complete ban on advertising for cigarettes, as well as advertising during programmes intended for young children. The ABC, the nation's public broadcaster, broadcasts no external advertisements, but between programmes will broadcast promotions for itself, its own programmes and merchandise, although this is restricted to approximately five minutes per hour. SBS had similar restrictions on advertising until 2005 when it began airing external advertisements between programmes, and subsequently, during programmes, like the commercial networks, although remain limited to 5 minutes per hour with the first advertisement being half-hourly news updates. Back in 1978, major commercial networks had the longest ever ad break run with the record 353 minutes of advertising.

=== New Zealand ===
All major New Zealand television networks, both state-owned and private, screen advertisements. Adverts on average taking up 14 minutes of each hour; there are usually two advert breaks in a half-hour programme, and four advert breaks in an hour-long programme.

Television advertising began in New Zealand in April 1961, ten months after the first official television broadcast, and was initially allowed only on Tuesdays, Thursdays and Saturdays. Today, television adverts are only prohibited on holidays like Christmas Day, Good Friday and Easter Sunday, and between 6:00 am and midday on Sundays and Anzac Day. The Broadcasting Standards Authority can also prohibit advertisements on a channel for up to 24 hours as a penalty for serious breaches of broadcasting standards, although this penalty has only been imposed once (on TV3 for 2.5 hours in October 1999). The Advertising Standards Authority is responsible for advertisement compliance, and deals with advertisement complaints (except for election advertising, in which the Broadcasting Standards Authority is responsible).
