= BancNet =

Philippine interbank network

- Operating area: Philippines
- Members: 124
- ATMs: 21,762 (2021)
- Founded: 1990; 36 years ago
- Website: bancnet.com.ph

BancNet (also spelled Bancnet) is a Philippine-based interbank network connecting the ATM networks of local and offshore banks, and the country's single interbank network in the Philippines in terms of the number of member banks and annual transactions. Due to its status as the country's single ATM switch operator, it is designated by the Bangko Sentral ng Pilipinas (BSP) as the country's national ATM network.

BancNet is also the exclusive gateway of China's UnionPay, allowing access to the nearly 1 billion ATM cardholders from China. BancNet is allied with global payment brand JCB International, allowing JCB cardholders to make cash advances at BancNet member ATMs nationwide. Bancnet interconnects with international card networks Diners Club, Discover, KFTC, Mastercard, and Visa.

BancNet serves more than 41 million ATM cardholders of its 124 members and affiliates with over 21,000 ATMs and more than 304,000 POS terminals.

In 2008, Expressnet outsourced its ATM operations to BancNet. On January 30, 2015, BancNet and MegaLink announced their merger and will retain itself as its brand. With this and having no more competition, BancNet has become the Philippines' sole ATM switch and major cashless transactions and payments network operator.

== BancNet Payment System ==
BancNet
- Operating area: Philippines
- Members: 40 banks
- Founded: May 6, 1994

The BancNet Point-Of-Sale System is a local PIN-based electronic funds transfer (EFTPOS) payments solution operated by BancNet on behalf of the member banks and China UnionPay (CUP). The BN point of sale (POS) System allows merchants to accept the automated teller machine (ATM) cards of any active BancNet member bank as payment for goods or services and obliges BN to settle the transaction as early as the following banking day through a direct deposit to a settlement account with any member bank. Acceptance of CUP cards is limited to SM Prime Holdings, Inc.'s Department Store, Supermarket, Hypermarket, Super Sale, Watson's, Sports Central, SM Appliance, Toy Kingdom, and select Surplus Stores.

=== Systems components ===
The service has two major components: the infrastructure and the support services. BancNet deploys credit authorization terminals with requisite supplies, provides store signage (or point of sale display), maintains toll free connections for provincial merchants (PLDT, Innove (Globe Telecom) and Digitel) and performs actual transactions settlement (finance) (through the BN depository bank). To support the installations, BN provides maintenance, cashier orientation, and a 24 x 7 merchant helpdesk services, as well as daily electronic data processing, like transactions reporting and reconciliation.

In each accredited retail location, a terminal is installed. The terminal also connects to the member banks through the BancNet switch using the public phone system.

The operation is rudimentary: the cashier swipes a customer's ATM card on the terminal and keys in payment amount. The cardholder then selects his bank account and keys in the ATM Personal identification number (PIN). If the requested amount is successfully debited from the customer's account, receipts will be printed for both the customer and retailer.

BancNet does not charge rental or membership fees for retail merchants; instead, it charges interchange fees or a merchant discount rate for every successful debit transaction coursed through its system. Currently, BancNet's average merchant rate is about 1.0% net, while the average Visa/Mastercard credit and signature debit card merchant rate is about 2.5%, exclusive of the 0.5% creditable withholding tax. Some merchant sectors, such as food wholesalers and gasoline stations, have special reduced rates to accommodate business needs and profit margins.

BancNet introduced the BancNet Rewards Points program on August 15, 2009, the first points-based rewards system exclusively for debit purchases in the country. Every Php 25 in spend using an ATM debit or prepaid card of a member bank earned the cardholder 1 point. 2,000 points were needed to redeem the cash rebate of Php 100. The Rewards Points program ran through September 15, 2011.

=== Competitive landscape ===
It is easy to generalize that BancNet, Expressnet EPS, and Megalink Fastlink are direct competitors. In reality, though there is very little overlap in their respective constituencies given that 50% to 60% of all ATM cards issued in the country are for payroll. Cash is the true competition of electronic payment systems. According to a study by Intuition, commissioned by Visa Asia-Pacific, cash still accounts for 80% of all transactions in the region. This is in contrast to the situation in the United States where debit transactions outnumber cash purchases with the former accounting for 35% of total buy.

BancNet signed a Memorandum of Agreement with both Banco de Oro (a member bank of both Expressnet and Megalink) and Bank of the Philippine Islands (operator of Expressnet) for terminal sharing in 2009. However, internal settlement arrangements within each consortium are followed despite the terminal arrangements; e.g., BancNet POS transactions may still only be settled with a member bank. But this stipulation is reportedly under review as the BancNet POS is now being considered for the collection requirements of government agencies and government-controlled entities. In this case, a non-member bank acts as the depository while the BancNet treasury bank acts as the collecting bank.

== InstaPay ==
InstaPay

BancNet is the clearing switch operator of real-time electronic funds transfer clearing house InstaPay, one of the two electronic fund transfer services commissioned by the BSP (the other being PesoNet). As of 2022, the service shall be rebranded into InstaPay, powered by BancNet.

== History ==
BancNet was founded on July 17, 1990, as the Philippines' second ATM consortium when the ATMs of eight banks, PCI Bank (later Equitable PCI Bank, now Banco de Oro), Security Bank, Chinabank, RCBC, Allied Bank (now part of PNB), Metrobank, International Corporate Bank (Interbank) (now part of UnionBank) and CityTrust Banking Corp. (now part of BPI) formed BancNet. Other members have since joined.

In 1994, BancNet introduced a point-of-sale system to serve the retail payment requirements of cardholders. In 1997, BancNet started offering website hosting, email and surfing services to member banks at affordable rates.

In 2002, BancNet started its online banking and payment gateway system.

It was during the anniversary business forum of 2002 that BancNet introduced Interbank Funds Transfer, reportedly the first consortium-run automated transfer facility in the region. The product allows real-time, online transfer of money among the members of BancNet using either the payment gateway, the ATM or a cardholder's cellular phone.

A partnership with Globe Telecom, the second largest telecoms company in the Philippines, in 2006 allowed BancNet to expand ATM-like functions to the mobile phones of cardholders. This was followed by a similar agreement in early 2007 with Smart Communications, the dominant telecoms company, for mobile banking.

A Memorandum of Agreement was signed in 2007 with Nationlink, admitting the latter as the first network alliance member of BancNet. This allows all the rural bank members of Nationlink to enjoy the convenience of electronic banking on 8,000 ATMs and more than 10,000 Point-of-Sale terminals nationwide.

=== Payment system history ===
The first merchant accreditation contract was signed on May 6, 1994 with Rustan's Corp. but the service was first made available later that year at the Robinsons Galleria Supermarket. Given this was the second payment service enabled by BN (with bill payment on the ATM launched the year before), the brand "BancNet Payment System (BPS)" was coined at around the same time. It was decided in 2006 to do away with the independent brand given that the name BancNet has since developed a market cachet. In this way, the new marketing tagline "Pay Bills. Buy Things. Transfer Funds." supplements the official corporate identifier of "Non-Stop Banking Network" on marketing material.

The primary reason for the launch of the service was to become the terminal provider of the credit card operations of the member banks. At the time, Phil Commercial & International Bank (PCIB) - Bankard, Citibank, Rizal Commercial Banking Corporation, and Unicard (Metrobank) were major issuers of both branded and proprietary credit cards. In the early 1990s, there was a dramatic increase in credit card issuance and the member banks needed a way to expand without expending much capital. The model of shared ATM operations was then applied to the POS. Debit was treated as a pleasant side-effect of the terminal operations.

The member banks saw an opportunity to expand even faster in 2000 when talks for a broader-based consortium were started. The objective was ostensibly to compete against what was then seen as the hegemony of Equitable Card Network, Inc. (ECNI) in terminal operations. Negotiations went far enough that BN invested in office space in 139 Corporate Center. The consortium arrangement fell through in 2003 when foreign issuers backed out.

BN developed a better appreciation for the potential of debit especially at the turn of the new century. Growth has averaged 68% since launch, peaking at 71% between 2000 and 2001. A marketing/business development organization was created in 2002, with a product manager coming on board in 2003.

The BN Bills Payment facility has been extended on the POS since late 2007. To date, forty-six of the more than seventy billers available on the ATM are also on the POS channel. This is currently in use for member banks but BN may offer terminals to biller partners and merchants as their in-house collection service.

Cash withdrawal on the POS was launched in early 2008. The BN POS terminal may now be used to authorize cash withdrawals at key merchants like M. Lhuillier, a local pawnshop with over 1,000 locations nationwide. Cardholders will be charged P10.00 for every withdrawal; the merchant-partner may also impose an additional "convenience fee" for the transaction.

== Equity members ==
- Asia United Bank
- Banco de Oro
- Bank of Commerce
- Bank of the Philippine Islands
- China Banking Corporation
- Citibank Philippines
- CTBC Bank Philippines
- Development Bank of the Philippines
- EastWest Banking Corporation
- Equicom Savings Bank
- Land Bank of the Philippines
- Metropolitan Bank and Trust Company
- Philippine Bank of Communications
- Philippine Trust Company
- Philippine National Bank
- Philippine Veterans Bank
- Rizal Commercial Banking Corporation
- Robinsons Bank Corporation
- Security Bank Corporation
- Standard Chartered Bank Philippines
- Sterling Bank of Asia
- The Hongkong and Shanghai Banking Corporation
- UnionBank

== Other members ==
- All Bank (formerly Optimum Bank)
- Bangko Mabuhay
- Bank of Makati
- Bankways
- Bayad (formerly Bayad Center, InstaPay only)
- BDO Network Bank (subsidiary of Banco de Oro)
- BPI Direct BanKo, Inc.
- BPI Family Savings Bank (subsidiary of Bank of the Philippine Islands)
- BPI Globe BanKO
- Cantilan Bank Inc.
- Card Bank, Inc.
- CARD SME Bank Inc.
- Cebuana Lhuillier Rural Bank
- China Bank Savings (subsidiary of China Banking Corporation)
- CIMB Bank Philippines
- Citibank
- CitySavings (subsidiary of Union Bank of the Philippines)
- Citystate Savings Bank
- Cooperative Bank of Misamis Oriental
- Country Builders Bank
- D'Asian Hills Bank
- DCPay Philippines Inc. [Coins.PH] (InstaPay only)
- Deutsche Bank Philippines
- Dumaguete Bank
- Dungganon Bank, Inc.
- EastWest Rural Bank, Inc. (d.b.a. Komo, a mostly digital bank)
- Enterprise Bank, Inc.
- Entrepreneur Bank
- EON Bank PH (a UnionBank subsidiary)
- GCash Inc.
- GoTyme Bank
- GrabPay Philippines (InstaPay only)
- Isla Bank
- JuanCash (InstaPay only)
- Katipunan Banking Corporation
- KEB Hana Bank Manila (formerly Korea Exchange Bank)
- Lazada Wallet Philippines (applied, for InstaPay only)
- Legaspi Savings Bank
- Luzon Development Bank
- Malayan Savings Bank
- Maybank Philippines, Inc.
- MegaLink (as independent ATM deployer)
- Metro South Coop Bank
- MaxBank
- National Confederation of Cooperatives (NATCCO)
- Opportunity Kauswagan Bank (OK Bank)
- Palawan Pawnshop (InstaPay only)
- Partner Rural Bank
- PayMaya Philippines Inc. (Maya Bank)
- PBCOM Rural Bank (formerly Banco Dipolog)
- Planbank
- Philippine Resources Savings Bank
- Philippine Business Bank
- Philippine Postal Savings Bank (PostBank)
- Philippine Savings Bank (subsidiary of Metropolitan Bank and Trust Company)
- Pito AxM Platforms Inc. (a Seven Bank subsidiary)
- Producers Bank
- Queen City Development Bank
- Quezon Capital Rural Bank, Inc. (QCRB)
- RCBC Savings Bank (subsidiary of Rizal Commercial Banking Corporation)
- Rural Bank of Tangub City
- Security Bank Savings (subsidiary of Security Bank Corporation)
- ShopeePay Philippines (InstaPay only)
- South Bank, Inc.
- Standard Chartered Bank Philippines (acquired by EastWest Banking Corporation since 2016)
- StarPay (InstaPay only)
- Sterling Bank of Asia
- Sun Savings Bank
- Tonik Bank (InstaPay only, not yet serviceable for incoming bank transfers)
- UBX Philippines (i2i Mobile ATM, a UnionBank subsidiary)
- Yuanta Savings Bank (formerly Tongyang Savings Bank)
- UCPB Savings Bank (subsidiary of United Coconut Planters Bank)
- WealthBank
- World Partners Bank, Inc.
- Zambank

== See also ==
- China UnionPay
- EFTPOS
- Expressnet
- Interbank network
- MegaLink
- Nationlink (Alliance Member of BancNet)
- ATM usage fees
- ENS

== General references ==
- "Our Members". BancNet.
- "List of Bancnet Member Banks and Short Names" (PDF). Philippine National Bank. Archived from the original (PDF) on July 8, 2022.
