= ONB =

ONB may refer to:

- Old National Bank, an American regional bank
- One Network Bank, a rural bank in Mindanao, Philippines
- Opera Nazionale Balilla, an Italian Fascist youth organization
- Order of New Brunswick, a Canadian decoration (post-nominal letters)
- Orthonormal basis, a notion in linear algebra
- Österreichische Nationalbibliothek, the national library of Austria

See further:

- OeNB for Oesterreichische Nationalbank
