= Land Bank of the Philippines =

Government-owned bank in the Philippines

- LandBank Plaza at 1598 M. H. Del Pilar Street in Manila, still bearing the old logo
- Type: State-owned
- Industry: Finance and insurance
- Founded: August 8, 1963; 63 years ago (SEC No. : RA00003844)
- Headquarters: 1598 M.H. Del Pilar cor. J. Quintos Streets, Brgy. 699, Malate District, Manila, Philippines
- Key people: Secretary of Finance Frederick Go (Chairman); Ma. Lynette V. Ortiz (President and CEO)
- Products: Financial services
- Revenue: ₱160.18 billion (2025)
- Net income: ₱51.605 billion (2025)
- Total assets: ₱3.566 trillion (2025)
- Number of employees: >12,000 (2025)
- Website: landbank.com

Land Bank of the Philippines (LBP; Filipino: Bangko sa Lupa ng Pilipinas), often referred to simply as LandBank, is a government-owned bank in the Philippines with a special focus on serving the needs of farmers and fishermen. Although it provides the services of a universal bank, it is officially classified as a "specialized government bank" with a universal banking license.

LandBank is the second-largest bank in the Philippines in terms of assets and the largest government-owned bank. It is also one of the country's largest government-owned and controlled corporations and banking institutions, alongside the Development Bank of the Philippines (DBP), Overseas Filipino Bank (OFBank), and Al-Amanah Islamic Bank.

Unlike most Philippine banks, LandBank has a presence in all 82 provinces of the country. As of February 2020, it had 409 branches and extension offices, 46 lending centers, and 2,188 ATMs, forming an extensive network that serves rural-sector clients in areas where banking services are limited or unavailable.

== History ==
LandBank was established on August 8, 1963, as part of the Agricultural Land Reform Code as part of a program of land reform in the Philippines. It was to help with the purchase of agricultural estates for division and resale to small landholders and the purchase of land by the agricultural lessee.

In 1965, LandBank's by-laws were approved and its first board of trustees was formed, with the Secretary of Finance as chairman.

On October 21, 1972, Presidential Decree No. 27, signed by President Ferdinand Marcos, emancipated all tenant farmers working on private agricultural lands devoted to rice and corn, whether working on a landed estate or not. The system was implemented through a system of sharecropping or lease-tenancy. LandBank was tasked to collect 15-year land amortizations from beneficiaries at the cost of the value of the land plus six percent interest per annum.

By 1973, LandBank was in financial distress. It lacked the resources and the capital needed to implement the land reform programs and lacked the structure to implement the programs efficiently. On July 21, Marcos signed Presidential Decree No. 251 which revitalized the bank. The decree granted LandBank a universal banking license (the first bank in the Philippines to be issued such a license) with a social mission to spur countryside development. The decree expanded LandBank's powers to include lending for agricultural, industrial, homebuilding and home-financing projects and other productive enterprises, as well as lending to farmers' cooperatives and associations to facilitate production, marketing of crops and acquisition of essential commodities. LandBank was also required by the decree to provide timely and adequate support in all phases involved in the execution of agrarian reform and also increased its authorized capital to ₱3 billion. It also became exempted from all national, provincial, city and municipal taxes and assessments.

LandBank was reorganized in 1977 when it was divided into three sectors to better assess the needs of its customers. It was divided into Agrarian, Banking, and Operations sectors to strengthen operations and ensure long-term viability.

In 1982, the Agricultural Credit Administration (ACA), established under the same law as LandBank, was abolished and all its assets and functions transferred to LandBank. ACA's function was to extend credit to small farmers. Also in this year, Union Bank of the Philippines (UnionBank) was formed, with LandBank having a 40-percent stake in the government-owned commercial bank.

LandBank became the financial intermediary for the Comprehensive Agrarian Reform Program (CARP) in 1988. It was also in that year that UnionBank started a gradual privatization. The Aboitiz Group of Companies acquired LandBank's 40% share of UnionBank then which it continues to own. LandBank also became the third member of Expressnet, an interbank network in December 1991 but now a BancNet member.

On February 23, 1995, LandBank's charter was once again amended. Its authorized capital was increased to ₱9 billion and it became an official government depository. The number of members of the board of trustees was also increased to nine whereas the Secretary of Finance, as Chairman, the President of the Bank as Vice-Chairman, the Secretary of Agrarian Reform, the Secretary of Labor, and the Secretary of Agriculture as ex officio members.

On August 25, 1998, LandBank's authorized capital was once again increased to 25 billion pesos, and it then increased to 200 billion pesos, after the planned DBP–LandBank merger in 2016. As of end 2024, its authorized capital is at ₱800 billion; however, subscribed capital is just at the aforementioned of ₱200 billion, with paid up of only ₱163.78 billion.

In 2014, LandBank was planned to be merged with the Development Bank of the Philippines (DBP). President Benigno Aquino III signed Executive Order No. 198 on February 4, 2016, to formally pave the way for the merger, with the former as the surviving entity. However, the successive Duterte administration canceled the merger later that year. Around eight years later/on the third year of the Presidency of Bongbong Marcos, this had been officially cancelled.

On June 25, 2021, President Rodrigo Duterte signed Executive Order No. 142 which mandates the merging of LandBank with the United Coconut Planters Bank (UCPB), with LandBank as the surviving entity.

== Current operations ==
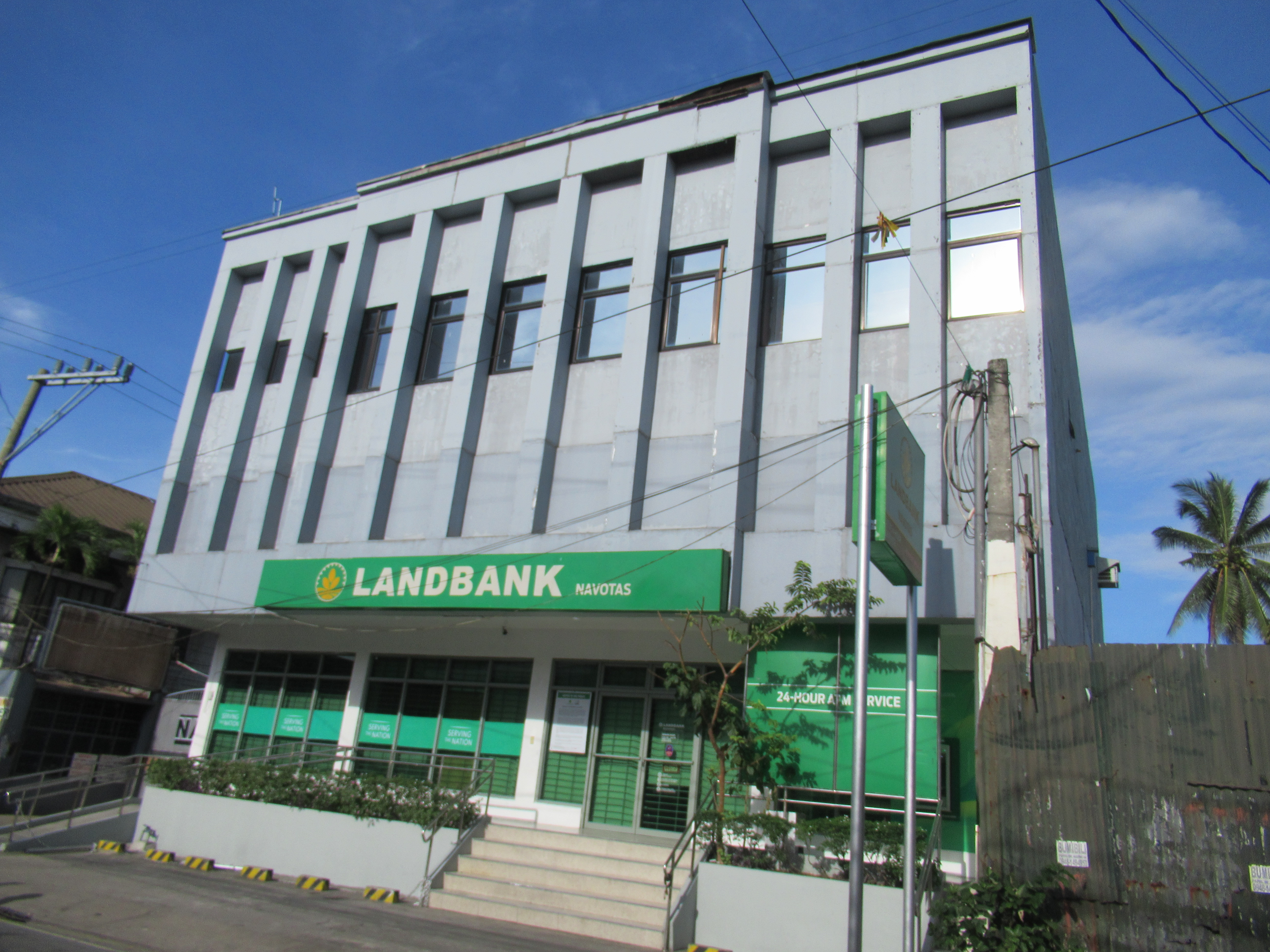
A LandBank branch in Navotas

LandBank competes against the major banks such as Metrobank, Bank of the Philippine Islands (BPI), Banco de Oro and Philippine National Bank (PNB). In rural areas, it either competes against or complements rural banks.

On the other end of the spectrum, LandBank takes on a dual role with the Development Bank of the Philippines, another government-owned bank. It either competes against or works with DBP, depending on the situation.

== Ownership ==
According to its Government Corporation Information Sheet (GCIS) as of December 31, 2025, it has only one shareholder which is the Government of the Philippines which exercises its powers through the Secretary of Finance as is mandated to be the ex-officio Chairman of the Board.

Major Shareholder	% of Total*	Common Shares	Preferred* Shares
Republic of the Philippines	100.00%	2,000,000,000 Paid up: 1,637,877,113	—
Total Authorized	—	8,000,000,000	—
Total Outstanding/Subscribed	100.00%	2,000,000,000 Paid up: 1,637,877,113	—

*Total voting stock (i.e. common + voting preferred).

=== Board of directors ===
- Chairman: Finance Sec. Frederick D. Go
- Vice Chairman: Ma. Lynette V. Ortiz
- Members:
  - Agriculture Sec. Francisco Tiu Laurel Jr.
  - Labor and Employment Sec. Francis Tolentino
  - Agrarian Reform Sec. Conrado M. Estrella III
  - Atty. David D. Erro - Representative, Agrarian Reform Beneficiaries Sector
  - Virginia N. Orogo - Representative, Agrarian Reform Beneficiaries Sector
  - Gaudencio S. Hernandez, Jr. - Representative, Private Sector
  - Omar Byron T. Mier - Representative, Private Sector

=== Executive management team ===
- Ma. Lynette V. Ortiz - President & CEO
- Marilou L. Villafranca - Executive Vice President, Branch Banking Sector
- Alan V. Bornas - Executive Vice President, Operations Sector
- Atty. Roderick P. Sacro - Executive Vice President, Corporate Services Sector
- Grace Ofelia Lovely V. Dayo - Senior Vice President, Digital Banking Sector
- Charlotte I. Conde - Executive Vice President, National Development Lending Sector
- Gonzalo Benjamin A. Bongolan - Senior Vice President, Treasury and Investment Banking Sector

== Subsidiaries and affiliates ==
Land Bank has the following subsidiaries and affiliates:

- LBP Leasing Corporation
- LBP Insurance Brokerage, Inc.
- LBP Resources and Development Corporation (former LB (Land Bank) Realty Development Corporation)
- LBP Countryside Development Foundation, Inc.
- Landbank Securities, Inc.
- Overseas Filipino Bank
- Maharlika Investment Corporation (MIC) (40% of common shares)

== See also ==
- List of banks in the Philippines
- Expressnet
- BancNet
