= Nationlink =

Nationlink may refer to:

- Nationlink (interbank network), an interbank network in the Philippines
- NationLink Telecom, a telecommunications operator in Somalia and the Middle East
