= Development Bank of the Philippines =

Bank in the Philippines

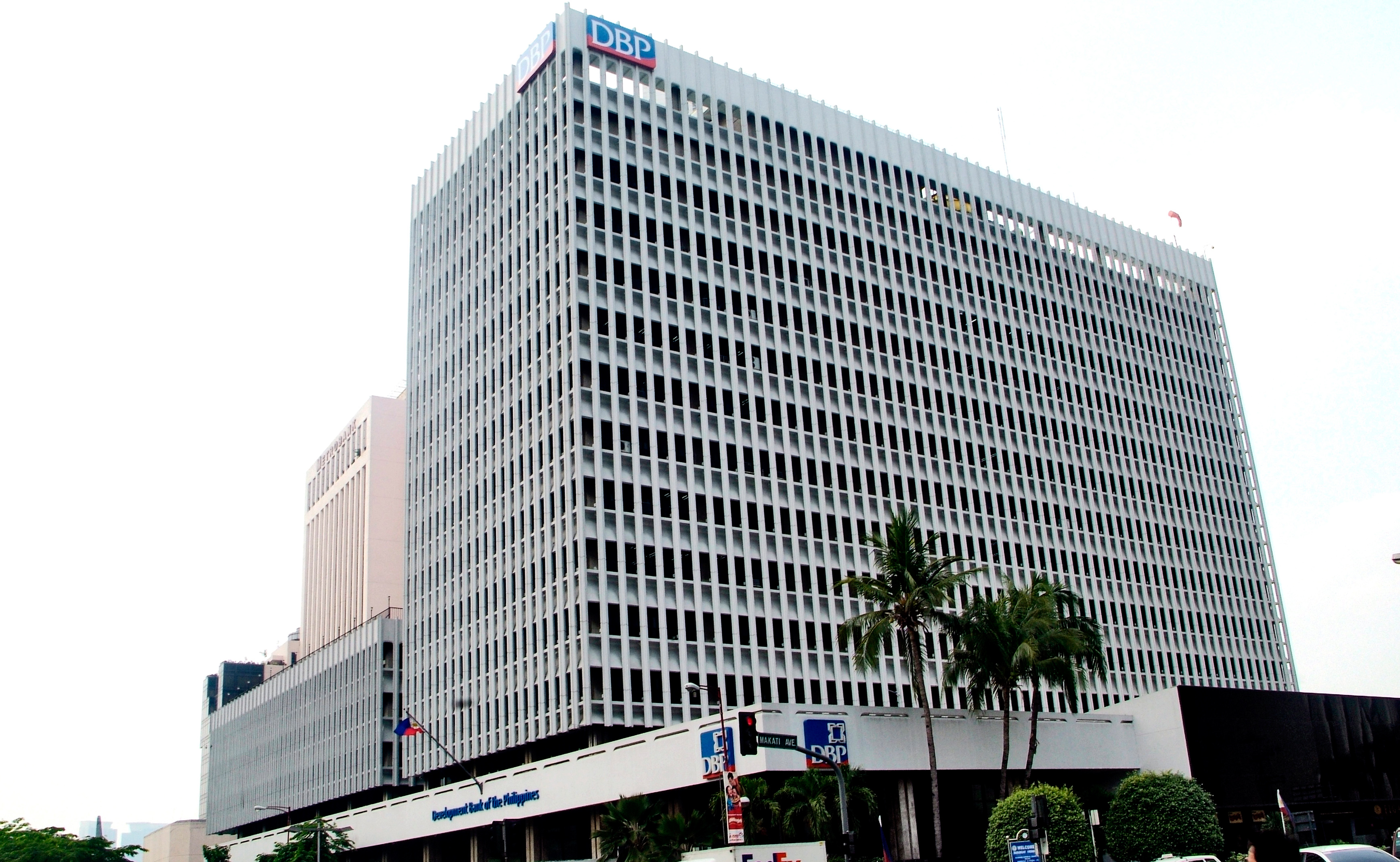
- DBP Head Office at Gil Puyat Avenue corner Makati Avenue, Makati
- Type: Government financial institution
- Industry: Development finance
- Founded: January 2, 1947; 79 years ago in Manila, Philippines
- Headquarters: Makati, Philippines
- Key people: Philip G. Lo (Chairman); Michael O. de Jesus (President and CEO)
- Services: Financial Services
- Net income: ₱5.60 billion (2019)
- Total assets: ₱1.04 trillion (2020)
- Website: www.dbp.ph

The Development Bank of the Philippines (DBP; Filipino: Bangko sa Pagpapaunlad ng Pilipinas) is a government-owned development bank headquartered in Makati, Philippines. It primarily provides banking services to meet the needs of agricultural and industrial enterprises. As of October 2022, it had 146 branches, including 14 branch-lite units.

DBP was established in 1947, after World War II, as part of the government's efforts to rebuild the country's war-damaged infrastructure. It focuses on four major areas of financing: infrastructure and logistics, social services, small and medium enterprises, and the environment.

As of 2023, DBP was the eighth-largest bank in the Philippines in terms of assets. It is one of the government-owned and controlled banks in the Philippines, alongside Land Bank of the Philippines (LBP), Overseas Filipino Bank (OFW Bank), and Al-Amanah Islamic Bank. As a government-owned and controlled corporation (GOCC), DBP is required to declare and remit at least half of its annual net earnings to the national government.

== History ==
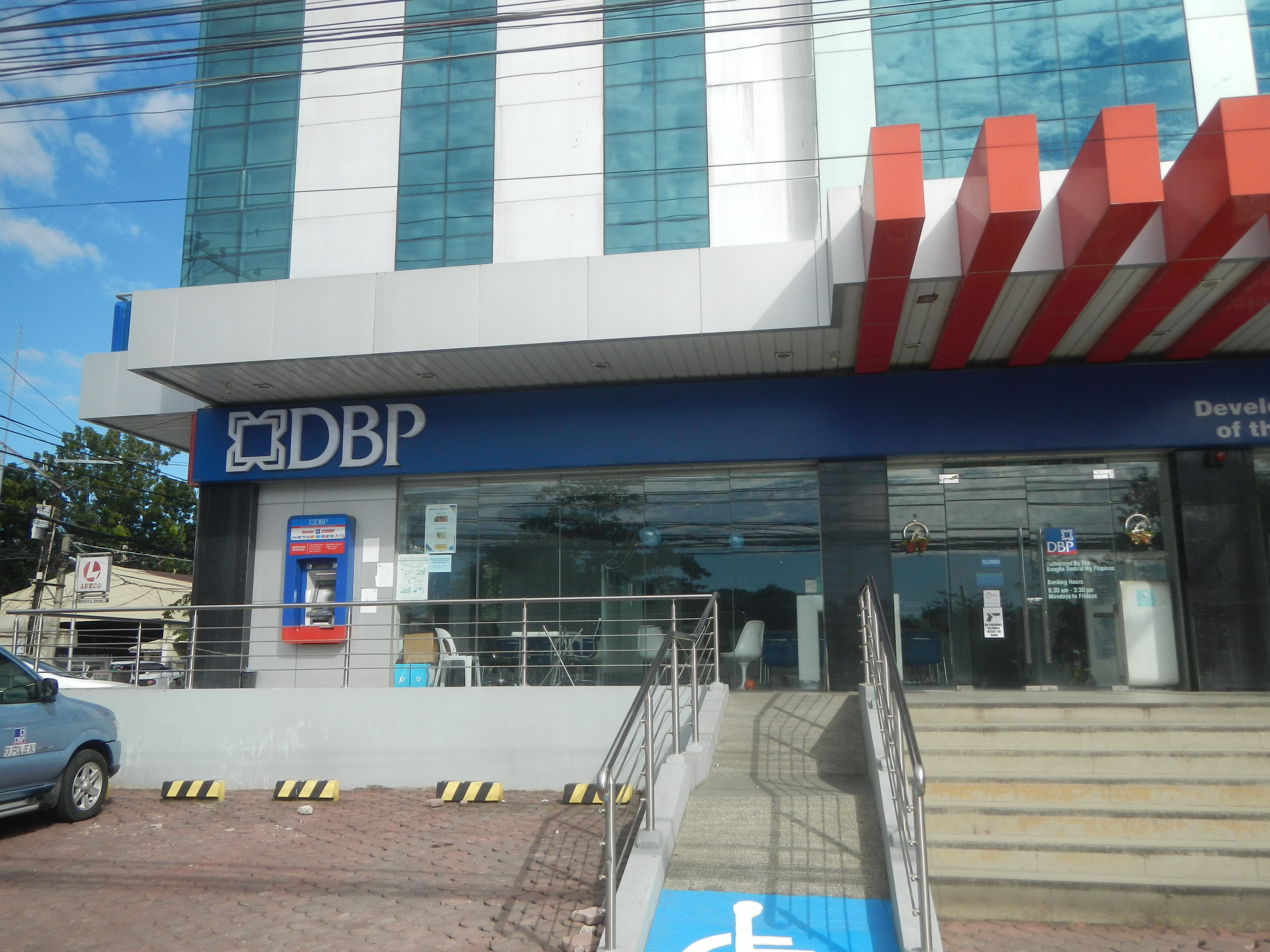
A DBP branch in San Fernando, La Union

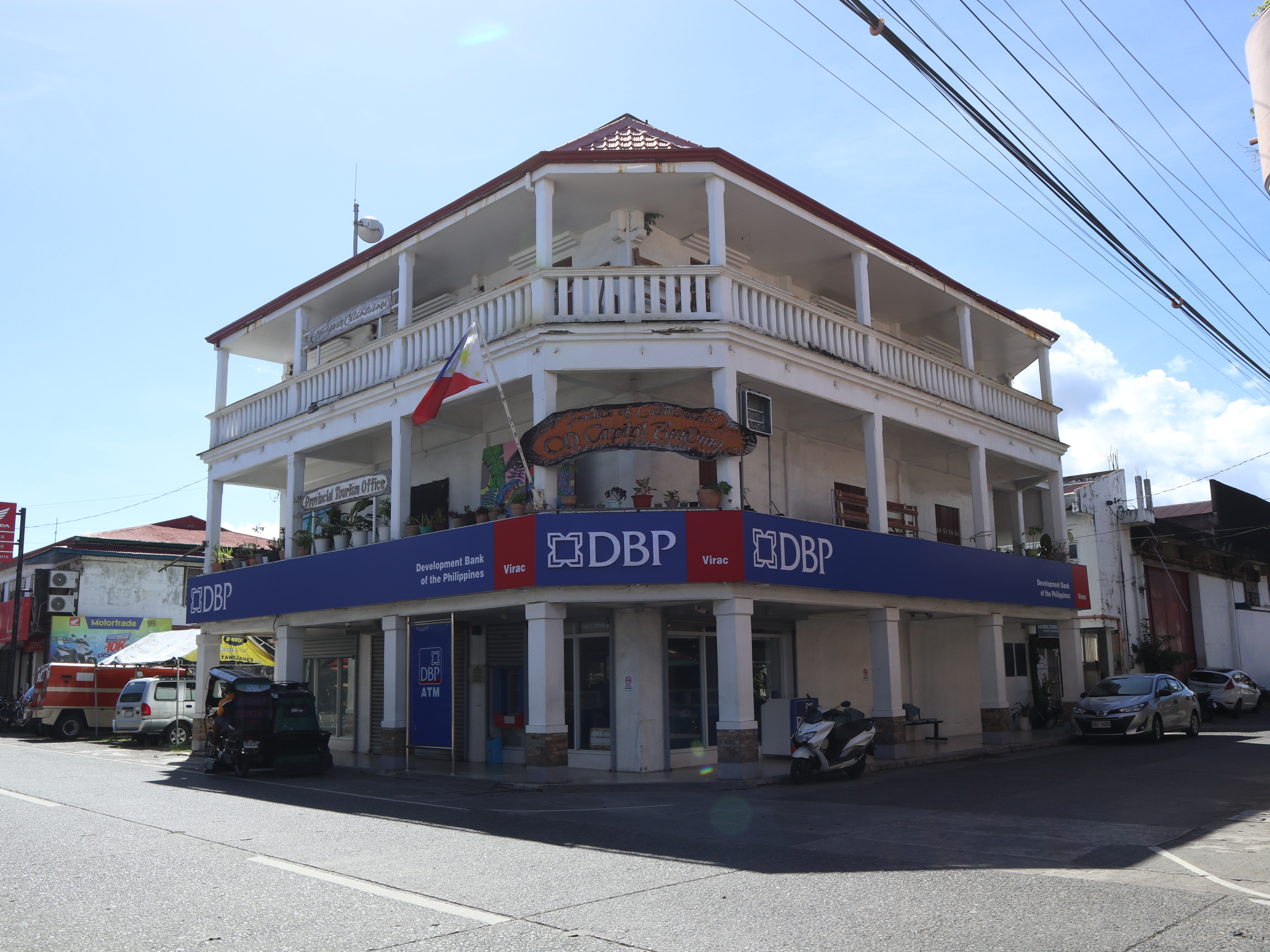
A DBP branch in Virac, Catanduanes

DBP's history can be traced back to the Commonwealth Era. In 1935, the National Loan and Investment Board (NLIB) was created to coordinate and manage various government trust funds such as the Postal Savings Fund and the Teacher's Retirement Fund.

In 1939, the NLIB was abolished and its functions were transferred to a new body, the Agricultural and Industrial Bank (AIB). AIB continued operations until the outbreak of World War II.

In 1947, the government created the Rehabilitation Finance Corporation (RFC) under Republic Act No. 85 which absorbed the assets and took over the functions of the AIB. The RFC provided credit facilities for the development of agriculture, commerce and industry and the reconstruction of properties damaged by the war.

In 1958, the RFC was reorganized into the modern-day DBP. The change in corporate name marked the shift from rehabilitation to broader activities.

With an initial capital of ₱500-million, DBP set to work on expanding its facilities and operations to accelerate efforts towards promoting national economic development. The bank established a nationwide branch network and tapped local and foreign resources to complement its capital. It also borrowed money directly from international finance institutions.

In the late 1970s up to the early 1980s under the Presidency of Ferdinand Marcos however, its viability was undermined by numerous non-performing accounts.

In 1986, President Corazon Aquino issued Executive Order No. 81, which reorganized the bank and gave it a new charter. All non-performing assets and liabilities were subsequently transferred to the government. DBP undertook an institutional strengthening program, including a thorough revision of its credit process, as well as employee training programs towards the intensive implementation of its new lending thrusts. DBP likewise reopened its lending windows for housing, agriculture and SMEs.

In 1995, DBP was granted an expanded banking license and attained universal banking status.

President Fidel Ramos signed Republic Act No. 8523 in 1998, amending DBP's 1986 charter. Among the major provisions incorporated in the new DBP charter were the increase of authorized capital stock from ₱5-billion to ₱35-billion, and the creation of the position of President and CEO.

In February 2016, President Benigno Aquino III approved the merger of DBP with government-owned Land Bank of the Philippines, pending approval from the Bangko Sentral ng Pilipinas (BSP) and written consent of the Philippine Deposit Insurance Corporation. A few months later in September under the administration of newly-elected Rodrigo Duterte, such had been cancelled for implementation by the Governance Commission for GOCCs (GCG). By 2023, two presidents later under the administration of Bongbong Marcos, the idea of such merger is again on the cards, with target completion around middle of 2024. However, as of early October 2023, the BSP says that they still haven't formally received an application for the merger. Finance Secretary Ralph Recto later announced in February 2024 that the proposed DBP-Landbank merger is no longer pursued.

== Organization ==
The affairs and business of DBP are directed and its properties managed and preserved, and its corporate powers exercised by a board of directors consisting of nine members, all appointed by the President of the Philippines. The term of office of the chairman, president and the members of the board of directors are for a period of one year or until such time as their successors are appointed.

The chairman of the board is appointed by the President of the Philippines from among the members of the board: provided, that the positions of chairman of the board and president of DBP are not to be held by the same person.

The DBP chairman presides at meetings of the board, while the president of the bank serves as vice-chairman of the board, and as such, assists the chairman and acts in his stead in case of absence or incapacity.

The chief executive officer of DBP is the president, who is elected by the board of directors from among themselves with the advice and consent of the President of the Philippines. The DBP president shall, among other powers and duties, execute, carry out and administer the policies, measures, orders and resolutions approved by the board; direct and supervise the operation and administration of the bank; and exercise such other powers and perform such other functions or duties as may be assigned to him by law or by the board from time to time.

The DBP board of directors provides for an organization and staff of officers and employees of the bank and upon recommendation of the DBP president, fix their remuneration and other emoluments. All positions in the bank are governed by the compensation, position classification system and qualification standards approved by the DBP board of directors based on a comprehensive job analysis of actual duties and responsibilities.

== Key officials ==
The key officials of the bank include:

- Philip G. Lo – Chairman
- Michael O. de Jesus – President and Chief Executive Officer
- Emmeline C. David – Director
- Eddie Abel C. Dorotan – Director
- Delfin T. Hallare, Jr. – Director
- Cezar M. Jayme, Jr. – Director
- Jaime Z. Paz – Director
- Armando O. Raquel-Santos - Director
- Eduardo F. Saguil – Director

== Subsidiaries ==
DBP subsidiaries and affiliates include:

- Al-Amanah Islamic Investment Bank of the Philippines
- DBP Leasing Corporation
- DBP Data Center, Inc.
- DBP Management Corporation

== See also ==
- List of banks in the Philippines
- Land Bank of the Philippines
- BancNet
- List of national development banks
