= Sterling Bank of Asia =

Bank in the Philippines

- Company type: Public
- Industry: Finance
- Founded: March 30, 2007; 19 years ago
- Headquarters: San Juan, Metro Manila, Philippines
- Number of locations: 48 branches
- Key people: Ruben C. Tiu (Chairman), Gregorio T. Yu (Vice Chairman), Cecilio Paul D. San Pedro (President and CEO)
- Services: Banking, Insurance
- Net income: ₱102.7 million ▼ (2020)
- Total assets: ₱39.4 billion (Q3 2022)
- Website: www.sterlingbankasia.com

Sterling Bank of Asia (SBA) (Hokkien Chinese: 融通亞洲銀行; Pe̍h-ōe-jī: Iông-thong A-chiu Gûn-hâng) is a savings bank in the Philippines principally owned by the JTKC Group of Companies, Surewell Equities, and Star Equities engaged in diverse industries ranging from logistics to finance, real estate, manufacturing, hotel and resort properties. It was established on 30 March 2007 in response to the Philippine government's mandate to create specialized financial institutions that would support the development and growth of the small and medium enterprise sector.

As of 2022, it was the sixth largest thrift bank in the Philippines in terms of total assets. It had forty eight branches all throughout the country. It started to operate with seven branches in 2007 prior to its acquisition of Centennial Savings Bank in 2009.

== See also ==
- BancNet
- List of banks in the Philippines
