= Queen City Development Bank =

Bank in the Philippines

- Company type: Private
- Industry: Finance and Insurance
- Founded: Iloilo City, Philippines (1981; 45 years ago)
- Headquarters: Sky City Tower, Mapa Street, Iloilo City Proper, Iloilo City, Philippines
- Key people: Rogelio M. Florete (Chairman Emeritus); Margaret Ruth C. Florete (President)
- Products: Financial services
- Net income: P20.1 million PHP (▲) (2019)
- Owner: Rogelio Florete
- Parent: Florete Group
- Website: www.queenbank.com.ph

Queen City Development Bank, also known as Queenbank, is a Philippine private development bank based in Iloilo City. Founded in 1981, it has branches operating in key cities all over the country, offering financial services to both companies and individual investors. Its services include deposit in investment banking, corporate and retail financing, dollar deposits and other basic banking products.

Queen City Development Bank is owned by Rogelio Florete, and is one of the few banks with headquarters outside Metro Manila that is a member of an interbank ATM network (BancNet).

== History ==
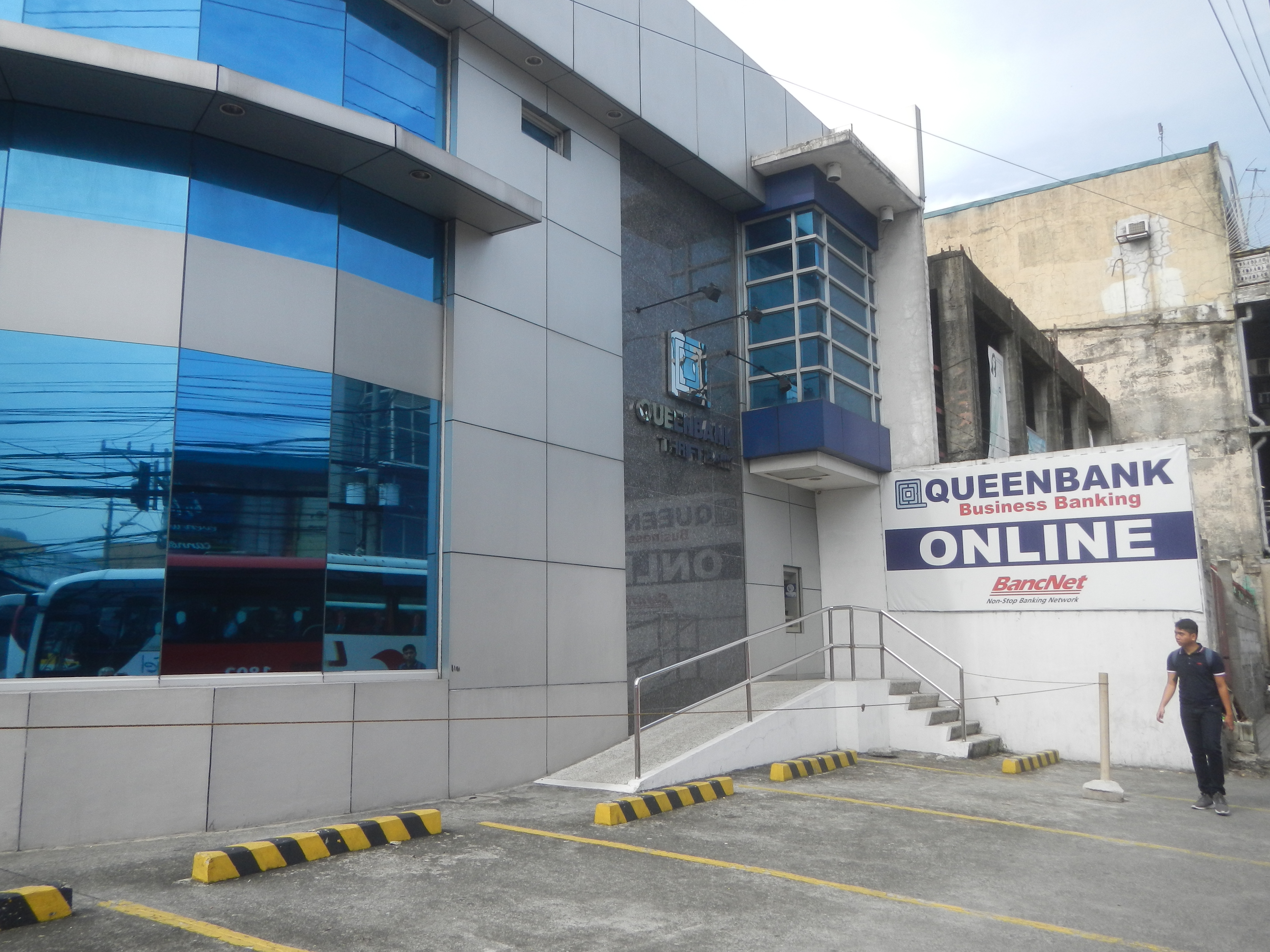
A QueenBank branch in Metro Manila

Founded on July 18, 1981, Queen City Development Bank is a private thrift bank with head office in Iloilo City. To date (2012), it has fifteen (15) branches all over the Philippines. It offers corporate and private financial services such as investment banking deposits, corporate and retail financing, peso and dollar deposits apart from the basic banking services.

Queenbank started out as an 11-personnel, single-branch financial institution with Php 11-million paid-up capital. The year after its foundation, it became an accredited foreign exchange dealer. Gradually, the bank obtained additional facilities and built a name for itself amidst a throng of emerging and more established banking institutions. Through the years, the bank has been supporting small and medium enterprises (SMEs) with their financial and banking needs.

The 90s saw a surge in the bank’s expansion of offered services. In 1993, it was granted the authority to participate in institutions such as the Philippine Clearing House Corporation (PCHC) and accept and create demand deposits. Participating in the PCHC gave the bank authority to offer checking account services to its clients. The following year, the bank invested in Automated Teller Machines (ATMs) and offered the service to its clients, yielding to an increase in clients and deposit volume.

With its core operations located in Iloilo City, the bank has established branches in other key cities around the country.
