= RCBC robbery-massacre =

2008 bank robbery in Laguna, Philippines

- Date: May 16, 2008
- Time: Prior to 9:00am (PhST)
- Location: RCBC Science Park, Cabuyao, Laguna, Philippines; 14°14′24.8208″N 121°06′8.478″E
- Type: Theft and massacre
- Deaths: 10 bank employees killed
- Suspects: Ampang Colanggo robbery group, Joel Dela Cruz, Allan Bago, Danilo Letoquit, Ricardo Gomolon(and other "John Does" and a female), Jake Javier, Vivencio Javier, Tolentino Magsino (deceased), Pepito Magsino (deceased)
- Accused: Crisanto Alvarez (alleged lookout), Eugenio Hillario, Jesus Narvaez Garcia
- Charges: Robbery, homicide
- Money stolen: ₱9 million

On May 16, 2008, a branch of the Rizal Commercial Banking Corporation (RCBC) in Cabuyao, Laguna, Philippines was robbed.

It is described as the worst bank robbery in Philippine history.

== Background ==
A robbery-massacre occurred at the branch of the Rizal Commercial Banking Corporation (RCBC) inside the Laguna Industrial Science Park in Barangay Pulo of Cabuyao, Laguna.

The crime occurred prior to the scheduled 9am opening of the outlet with customers alerting the police after the bank did not open as scheduled.

At the scene, a security guard and eight other bank employees were found dead. A tenth bank official was found seriously wounded and was rushed to a hospital. The tenth victim died two days later. The victims were concluded to have been lined up and shot dead by one of the perpetrators. In total the victims consist of eight males and two females.

Authorities, speculated that the perpetrators made use of silencers since nearby residents did not notice any gunshots. There was no signs of forcible entry noted with the bank's backdoor found open. The perpetrators were speculated to be already in the bank early morning. The police recovered 17 empty shells from a .45 calibre pistol and some live ammunitions for an M16 rifle ₱9 million was looted from the bank.

The gang of Herbert "Ampang" Colanggo has been alleged to be involved in the RCBC robbery-massacre. According to police who investigated the case, the lack of eyewitness was the reason why the investigation for the motives and looking for potential suspects is complicated

== Reactions ==
President Gloria Macapagal Arroyo ordered the immediate investigation on the robbery case.

The Philippine National Police (PNP) formed Task Force RCBC to handle the robbery-massacre case.

Several bounty offers were put forward by various politicians and the RCBC itself in exchange for the arrest of the robbery-massacre's suspects.

=== May 22 police shootout ===
Three suspects were killed in shootouts with the police in their residences in Tanauan, Batangas on May 22, 2008. In September 2008, the kin of the suspects, accompanied by lawyer Harry Roque who denied their slain relatives' involvement in the robbery filed charges against the police using reports by the Commission on Human Rights as their reference.

== In popular culture ==
The incident was featured in a crime documentary series Case Unclosed on GMA Network, it was aired on January 22, 2009.
