= Rizal Commercial Banking Corporation =

Bank in the Philippines owned by Yuchengco family

- The logo of RCBC since 2017

- RCBC Plaza, current headquarters of Rizal Commercial Banking Corporation in Makati.
- Type: Public
- Traded as: PSE: RCB
- Industry: Financial Services
- Founded: Makati, Rizal, Philippines (September 23, 1960; 66 years ago)
- Headquarters: Makati, Philippines
- Key people: Helen Yuchengco-Dee (Chairwoman); Cesar Enrique A. Virata (Vice Chairman); Reginaldo Cariaso (President and CEO)
- Services: Banking
- Net income: ₱10.6 billion (2025)
- Total assets: ₱1.57 trillion (2025)
- Owners: Yuchengco Group of Companies; Cathay Financial Holdings; International Finance Corporation; SMBC
- Number of employees: 6,000
- Parent: Yuchengco Group of Companies
- Website: www.rcbc.com

The Rizal Commercial Banking Corporation (PSE: RCB), commonly known as RCBC is one of the largest universal banks in the Philippines with total consolidated resources of Ph₱ 1.57 trillion. It was established in 1960 as a development bank and is licensed by the Bangko Sentral ng Pilipinas (BSP) for both commercial and investment banking. It is currently headquartered at RCBC Plaza in Makati, Metro Manila.

RCBC is majority-owned by the Yuchengco Group of Companies (YGC), one of the oldest and largest conglomerates in Southeast Asia covering over 60 businesses which include the non-life insurance company, Malayan Insurance, a life insurance company joint venture with Sun Life Financial Philippines, SunLifeGREPA Financial, Inc.; the construction company EEI Corp.; educational institutions; and vehicle dealerships. Other significant investors of the bank include the World Bank's International Finance Corporation, Cathay Life Insurance Co., Ltd., a wholly owned subsidiary of Cathay Financial Holding, Ltd., and Sumitomo Mitsui Banking Corporation (SMBC). RCBC issues first US dollar sustainability bonds. RCBC issues VISA, Mastercard, JCB, and UnionPay credit cards through RCBC Bankard.

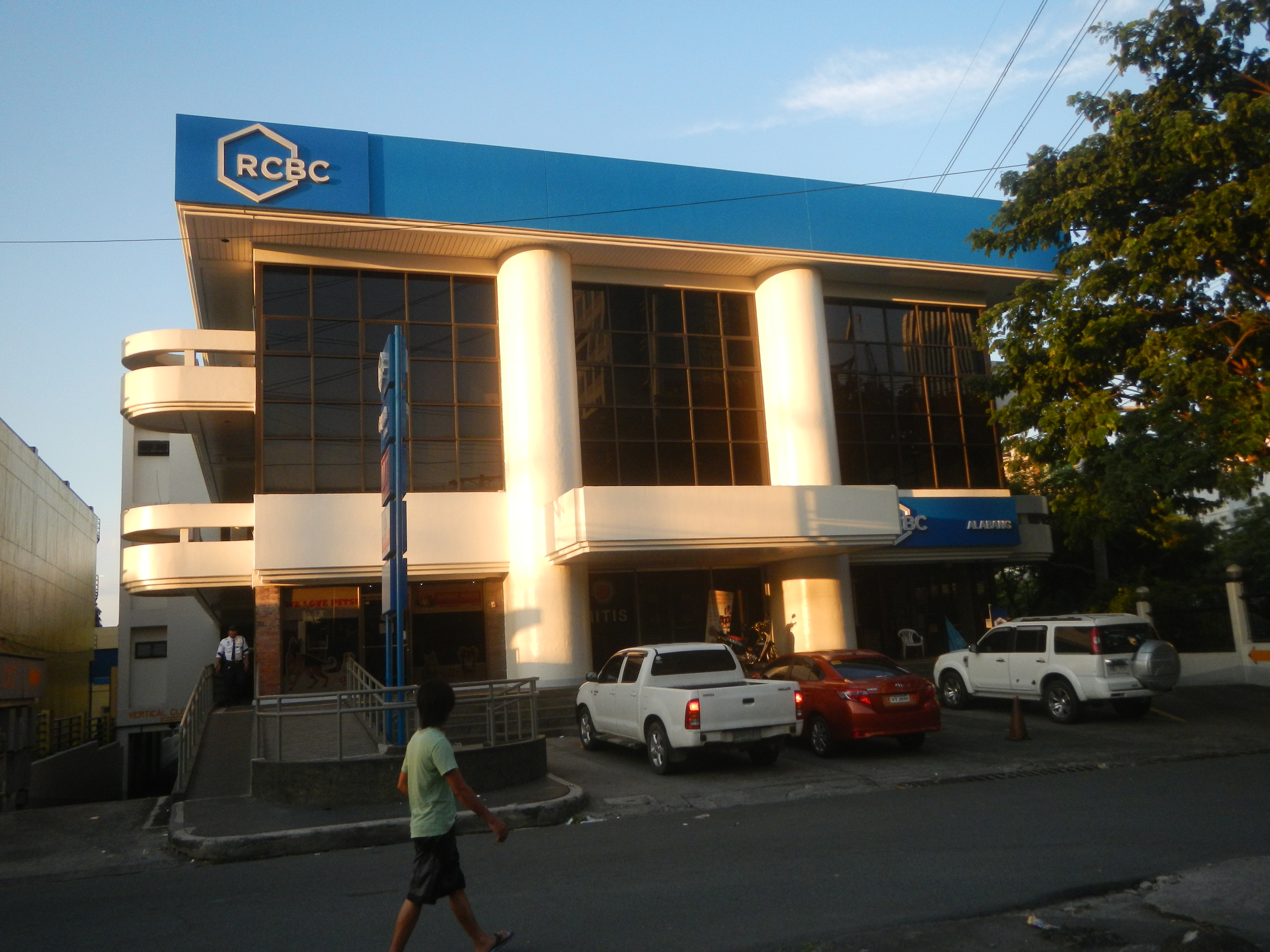
An RCBC branch in Muntinlupa

== History ==
The bank was established by Alfonso Yuchengco on September 23, 1960, as Rizal Development Bank, a small development bank based in Makati, which was then part of Rizal province. It initially operated with 15 employees at a one-room office along Ayala Avenue. It was later upgraded to a commercial bank upon the approval of the Bangko Sentral ng Pilipinas and, in 1963, began operation as such under its present name Rizal Commercial Banking Corporation (RCBC). RCBC established its first head office at 219 Buendia Avenue, also in Makati, making it the first commercial bank to do so in the province. In 1989, it acquired its universal banking license.

In 2000, RCBC acquired major control of Bankard Inc., a credit card company from divestment of Equitable PCI Bank. In 2006, the acquisition of almost all assets of Bankard was approved.

In 2007, RCBC acquired the thrift bank Merchants Savings and Loan Association Inc. from Finman Capital Corp. and consolidated it with its own thrift bank RCBC Savings Bank with the aim for increasing its branch network. In 2009, RCBC acquired J.P. Laurel Rural Bank in Batangas to expand microfinance operations to Luzon. On October 28, 2013, RCBC's microfinance subsidiary, Rizal Microbank opened the very first banking office made of recycled shipping container vans in the Philippines. On 2012, RCBC acquired First Malayan Leasing and Finance Corporation and its subsidiary Malayan Rental to enter equipment leasing business.

In 2019, RCBC raised ₱ 15 billion in Peso Bond, the Philippines’ first green finance framework under the ASEAN Green Bond Standards. In June 2019, the Bangko Sentral ng Pilipinas (BSP) approved RCBC's merger with its thrift bank RCBC Savings Bank.

In early 2020, RCBC's board approved a new digital banking platform through the creation of its wholly owned rural bank. In July 2020, RCBC launched its digital bank DiskarTech offering an interest rate of 3.25% per annum with no minimum deposit and maintaining balance. After the Bangko Sentral ng Pilipinas (BSP) released the guidelines for digital banks in December 2020, RCBC's executives said that they have not yet finalized a decision if they will apply for a separate digital bank license.

In 2021, Sumitomo Mitsui Banking Corporation (SMBC) acquires a 5% stake in the Bank.

CEO Eugene Acevedo launched RCBC Boz mobile application, the ATM Go as part of RCBC’s Barangayan Banking, digital banking platform and RCBC Pulz, among others.

2023 saw SMBC acquire an additional 15% stake through a PhP27 billion capital infusion.

On 24 November 2024, it was reported that RCBC has been chosen of one of the preferred financing partners of Tesla in the Philippines, offering a fully digital loan application experience to customers with approval within a single day.

Effective July 1, 2025, Reginaldo B. Cariaso assumed the position of President and CEO.

The purchase of an additional 4.46 percent interest in 2025 lifts SMBC’s ownership from 20 percent to 24.46 percent through a P6.4 billion investment.

=== Incidents ===
On May 16, 2008, a robbery-massacre occurred at the RCBC Laguna Industrial Science Park branch in Pulo, Cabuyao, Laguna. Nine people – a security guard and eight other bank employees – were shot and later declared dead at the crime scene, while a tenth person was found seriously wounded and was rushed to a hospital, before dying a few days later. The victims were concluded to have been lined up and shot dead by the perpetrators.

In 2016, some funds from the Bangladesh Bank robbery incident were diverted to fictitious accounts at the Jupiter Street branch of RCBC. Some executives were charged with anti-money laundering. In the February 29, 2024 judgment on the Bangladesh Bank robbery, the New York Supreme Court dismissed 3 causes of action—conversion, aiding and abetting conversion, and conspiracy to commit conversion—against RCBC and defendants Ismael Reyes, Brigitte Capiña, Romualdo Agarrado and Nestor Pineda for lack of personal jurisdiction. It however allowed the Bangladesh Bank case concerning the $81-million cyberheist to proceed on other grounds including the return of money received.

== See also ==
- BancNet
