= Encash Network Service =

Encash Network Services, or ENS, is an independent switch network in the Philippines. It initially connected the ATMs of four rural banks. In its 30 months of operation as of May 2010, this network eventually expanded to more than 101 ATMs, targeting all rural banks and cooperatives. ENS is a member of MegaLink, which is interconnected with the other Philippine interbank networks, i.e. BancNet and Expressnet.

ENS was expected to provide a low-cost solution for banks and cooperatives who wish to implement ATM services compliant with global standards but cannot afford the costs of connecting to the three main networks.

ENS operates a switch-in-front architecture, connected to appropriate transaction authorization entities. These were to include Member Bank CA/SA systems, electronic money/wallet systems, and Visa or Mastercard. The switch network is geared toward accepting transactions using other front-end devices, e.g., POS. Thus, ENS presents both rural and commercial bank ATM cardholders with more access to ATMs.

On June 8, 2010, ATM withdrawals for the year reached one million, while ENCASH ATMs dispensed more than Php 3 Billion.

ENS launched the ATM portion of its interbank network on November 16, 2007.

== See also ==
- BancNet
- MegaLink
- Expressnet
- Nationlink
- ATM usage fees
