= Eugene Acevedo =

Filipino business executive

Eugene S. Acevedo
- Born: Eugene Sering Acevedo; Cebu City, Philippines
- Education: Asian Institute of Management; University of San Carlos

Eugene Sering Acevedo is a Filipino business executive, currently serving as president and CEO of Rizal Commercial Banking Corporation (RCBC).

He was previously was president and CEO of Philippine National Bank, Chairman of CitySavings, and a managing director with Citibank.

He was born in Cebu City, was raised in Surigao del Sur, and studied at the De La Salle John Bosco College in Bislig and the University of San Carlos and the Asian Institute of Management.

Before becoming a banker, Acevedo was a Physics Lecturer at the University of the Philippines - National Institute of Physics; he also serves as a Fellow of the Institute of Corporate Directors.

Under Acevedo's leadership, RCBC launched a mobile application called ATM Go.
