= BDO Network Bank =

Subsidiary of Banco de Oro

BDO Network Bank, Inc.
- Type: Subsidiary
- Industry: Finance and insurance
- Founded: 2004; 22 years ago, in Davao City
- Headquarters: Km. 9 Sasa, Davao City, Philippines
- Area served: Philippines
- Key people: Nestor V. Tan (chairman); Jesus Antonio S. Itchon (president)
- Products: Financial services
- Net income: PHP 743 million (Q3 2013)
- Total assets: PHP 159 billion (Q1 2026)
- Number of employees: 1,356 (2013)
- Parent: Banco de Oro

BDO Network Bank (BDO NB; officially BDO Network Bank, Inc.), formerly known as One Network Bank (ONB), is the 5th largest THRIFT bank in the Philippines as of March 2026. Established in 2004 through the consolidation of Network Rural Bank of Davao del Sur, the Rural Bank of Panabo of Davao del Norte, and the Provident Rural Bank of Cotabato, BDO Network Bank has now a network of more than 500 branches Nationwide and a fleet of more than 500 ATMs

It is the first rural bank in the Philippines to receive the nod of the Philippine Clearing House Corporation (PCHC) to establish a checking account, as well as to have its cheques cleared directly by the PCHC, instead of an intermediary bank. It is also an equity member of MegaLink (now a BancNet member), one of the first banks in Mindanao to join an interbank network.

In December 2014, the bank was acquired by Banco de Oro. The acquisition was completed in July 2015.

To align with the continued expansion of its parent company Banco de Oro (BDO Unibank), it changed its name to BDO Network Bank on August 6, 2019.

== Corporate history ==
One Network Rural Bank is a consolidation of three rural banks in the country.

Before the historic consolidation which formed the biggest rural bank in the country with the widest private banking network in Mindanao, there were three partner rural banks — Rural Bank of Panabo, Inc., Network Rural Bank, Inc. and Provident Rural Bank of Cotabato, Inc.

- Rural Bank of Panabo, Inc. (RB Panabo)

RB Panabo has been servicing Davao Province since 1967. While it was the component bank with the fewest branches, it provided technical and logistical support to its partner banks. Many of the banking systems and procedures used by its partner banks came from RB Panabo.

RB Panabo received its authority to operate from the Bangko Sentral ng Pilipinas on February 11, 1967. Founded by Dr. Luis A. Buenaventura, Jr. It was in 1980 that RB Panabo saw the induction of Alex V. Buenaventura as President of the bank.

- Network Rural Bank, Inc. (NB)

Originally the Rural Bank of Davao City and operating four branches across Davao City, it was merged in 1993 with 5 other rural banks — Community Rural Bank of San Isidro (Davao Oriental), Rural Bank of Governor Generoso (Davao Oriental), Rural Bank of Pantukan (Davao de Oro), Rural Bank of Bayugan (Agusan del Sur) and Rural Bank of Kalamansig (Sultan Kudarat) – and renamed as Network Rural Bank.

RB Panabo’s success was such that also in 1993, Network Rural Bank, Inc. asked Alex V. Buenaventura of RB Panabo to take over its helm. Mr. Buenaventura’s acceptance brought his leadership and rural banking experience into Network Bank. This move was the start of a long-standing partnership between the two rural banks.

In its 11 years of existence, Network Bank became a giant in the Philippine rural banking industry. From 9 branches in 1993, NB expanded to 33 branches in Mindanao.

The ties between the two banks even went so far as to spur the creation of another strong financial institution, what may be called the offspring of the RB Panabo and Network Bank.

- Provident Rural Bank of Cotabato (ProBank)

In 1996, Network Bank and a group of Cotabato investors, led by the Diocese of Kidapawan, acquired a rural bank in Central Mindanao called the Community Rural Bank of Matalam. Re-launched under a new name, Provident Rural Bank of Cotabato (Probank), a known Cotabato banker, Elpidio F. Masbad III, took over the reins as president of Probank.

From total assets of P5 million with P3 million owed to BSP, ProBank grew to a P 235 million bank with 7 branches in its 7-year run. The rapid turnaround can be attributed to aggressive marketing campaigns as well as logistic and systems support from Network Bank.

With a strong third partner in place, the basis for cooperation was set and the “three banks, one system” approach was formed.

- The Network Rural Banking Group (NRBG)

Working in parallel with similar systems was however not enough for the three rural banks. In 1996, RB Panabo and Network Bank entered a “mutual purchase” or stock swap arrangement. With Network Bank owning 49% of ProBank, the stockswap arrangement brought the three banks closer. This paved the way for the conception of The Network Rural Banking Group (NRBG).

The Network Rural Banking Group was created in 1998 when Network Bank, RB Panabo and ProBank resolved to operate as a single unit with joint policy formulation made possible through a common Executive Committee and synchronized systems and procedures. Sharing common central office services such as human resource development, legal services, treasury, product development, information technology, internal audit and appraisal, in effect, contributed to the rapid growth of the partner banks.

=== Consolidation ===
Former logo as One Network Bank from July 2015 to August 2019

After 8 years of working closely together, the partner banks decided to consolidate, allowing the Bank to take advantage of economies of scale, avail of incentives from the Bangko Sentral ng Pilipinas and bring better banking services to countryside Mindanao, given a bigger capital base and increased Single Borrowers Limit (SBL).

June 18, 2003 - Bangko Sentral ng Pilipinas (BSP) accepts the application for consolidation of three partner rural banks — Rural Bank of Panabo, Inc., Network Rural Bank, Inc. and Provident Rural Bank of Cotabato, Inc.

July 18, 2003 - Philippine Deposit Insurance Corporation (PDIC) approves the consolidation of the three rural banks.

December 22, 2003 - The Monetary Board, through resolution no. 1865 approved the consolidation and formation of the biggest rural bank in the country, One Network Bank.

January 2, 2004 - One Network Bank receives the notice of approval with incentives from the Bangko Sentral ng Pilipinas from BSP Governor Rafael Buenaventura.

March 14, 2004 - Thanksgiving Celebration and Launching held at The Venue in Davao City to officially launch the union of Rural Bank of Panabo, Inc., Network Rural Bank, Inc. and Provident Rural Bank of Cotabato, Inc. and celebrate the birth of One Network Bank.

April 1, 2004 - The three banks started its consolidated operations and with its combined resources formed the largest rural bank in the country.

March 31,2026 - BDO Network Bank is now the 5th largest Thrift Bank.

== See also ==
- List of banks in the Philippines
- BancNet
- MegaLink
