= Nationlink (interbank network) =

- Operating area: Philippines
- Members: Savings banks
- Founded: May 18, 2006
- Website: bancnetonline.com

Nationlink is an interbank network and EFTPOS network in the Philippines. Unlike the main Philippine interbank networks, BancNet, ENS, Expressnet and MegaLink, Nationlink does not attempt to compete. Instead, it seeks to complement those networks by extending the reach of ATMs in the countryside, as the main networks are concentrated in urban areas. Its closest competitor is the Encash Network Service. A USAID funded Ateneo de Manila University research suggests that the network is beneficial for handling remittances.

Nationlink's members consist mostly of savings banks, credit unions, rural banks, cooperatives and non-governmental organizations, and is concentrated in rural areas, where ATMs are more limited. The network focuses heavily on the overseas Filipino worker (OFW) market, since many OFWs and their dependents hail from the provinces. It intends to provide services previously unavailable in more remote areas of the Philippines, such as real-time remittance transfers and electronic bank account access.

The network is the first Philippine interbank network to rely largely on wireless communications, specifically on Shops Work Unplugged (SWUP), a product offered by the Philippine Long Distance Telephone Company (PLDT). Nationlink ATMs have built-in wireless modems that communicate with the PLDT landline telephone network wirelessly. Through SWUP, the network can install ATMs almost anywhere.

== History ==
The network debuted in Davao City on May 18, 2006, and is supported by PLDT, Microsoft, Intel and Diebold, as well as other companies. As of 2007 it operated twenty ATMs. By 2007, the network had access to BancNet, Expressnet and MegaLink.

== Member Institutions ==
- Agdao Multi-Purpose Cooperative (AMPC)
- Aurora Integrated Multi-Purpose Cooperative (AIMCOOP)
- Basey-1 Multi-Purpose Cooperative
- Rural Bank of Bato, Inc.
- Basak Layog Multi-Purpose Cooperative, Inc. (BLAMPCI)
- Alalay Sa Kaunlaran, Inc. (ASKI)
- Rural Bank of Cantilan, Inc. (Cantilan Bank; Powered by Bancnet, Of Which Is A Proud Member)
- Peoples Bank of Caraga
- Catmon Coop
- Coop Bank of Tarlac, Inc.
- Community Rural Bank of Dapitan, Inc.
- Gubat St. Anthony Cooperative, Inc. (GSAC)
- Rural Bank of Hilongos, Inc.
- Rural Bank of Hindang, Inc.
- Rural Bank of Koronadal
- Holy Child Multi-Purpose Cooperative (HCMPC)
- Loay Multi-Purpose Cooperative
- Cooperative Bank Of Quezon Province, Inc. (CBQ)
- North East West South Multi-Purpose Cooperative (NEWS-MPC)
- Rural Bank of Norzagaray, Inc.
- Metro Ormoc Credit Cooperative, Inc. (OCCCI)
- Optimum Development Bank (ODB)
- Palawan Savings Bank
- Palompon Community Cooperative, Inc. (PACCI-MPC)
- Perpetual Help Community Cooperative
- Perpertual Help Credit Cooperative, Inc. (PHCCI-TACLOBAN)
- Pintuyan National Vocation School (PNVS)
- Rural Bank of Datu Paglas, Inc.
- Rural Bank of Dulag, Inc.
- Rural Bank of Gattaran, Inc.
- Rural Bank of Jamindan, Inc.
- Rural Bank of Paracale, Inc.
- Sta. Cruz Development Cooperative (SACDECO)
- Rural Bank of San Mateo, Inc. (RBSMI)
- St. Peter And Paul Multi-Purpose Cooperative (SPMPC)
- Tayabas Community Multi-Purpose Cooperative (TCMC)
- Rural Bank of Zambales, Inc
- Barangka Credit Cooperative

== See also ==
- BancNet
- Encash Network Service
- Expressnet
- MegaLink
- ATM usage fees
