= Agricultural Land Reform Code =

The Agricultural Land Reform Code, officially designated as Republic Act No. 3844, was an advancement of land reform in the Philippines that was enacted in 1963 under President Diosdado Macapagal. It abolished tenancy and established a leasehold system in which farmers paid fixed rentals to landlords, rather than a percentage of harvest. In agricultural leasehold, the farmer cultivates the land belonging to, or possessed by, another with the latter's consent for a price certain in money or in produce or both. It also established the Land Bank of the Philippines to help with land reform, particularly the purchase of agricultural estates for division and resale to small landholders, and the purchase of land by the agricultural lessee.

While the law was a significant advance over previous legislation, the bill was weakened by numerous amendments imposed by Congress, which was dominated by landlords. It was also weakened by the failure of Congress to allocate necessary funds for effective implementation of the law. The act has been further amended several times subsequent to becoming law by later legislation.

Investment banker Sixto “Ting” K. Roxas (1927-2024), who founded the what was labelled as the country's "first and the premier investment bank" Bancom Development Corporation (Bancom), was said to have helped write what would become the code.

== Provisions ==
The main provisions of the Agricultural Land Reform Code were:

- To establish and encourage the formation of family-sized farms as the basis for Philippine agriculture
- To improve the lives of farmers by liberating them from harmful practices such as illegal interest rates
- To encourage greater productivity and increase income of small farmers
- To apply labor laws equally regardless of status
- To provide a land settlement program and promote equitable distribution of land
- To make poor farmers self-reliant, responsible citizens to strengthen society

== See also ==
- Department of Agrarian Reform
- Comprehensive Agrarian Reform Program
- Land reform in the Philippines
