= Cooperative Bank of Misamis Oriental =

Filipino cooperative bank

The Cooperative Bank of Misamis Oriental (CBMO) is a cooperative bank based in Misamis Oriental, Northern Mindanao (Region X), Philippines. It was established in 1979, with its first office at the back of the Provincial Capitol in Cagayan de Oro.

It participates in the Microenterprise Access to Banking Services program. A 2003 ADB report found that the bank was then among the top ten best performing cooperative banks in the country.
