= RCBC Credit Cards =

Credit card issuer in the Philippines

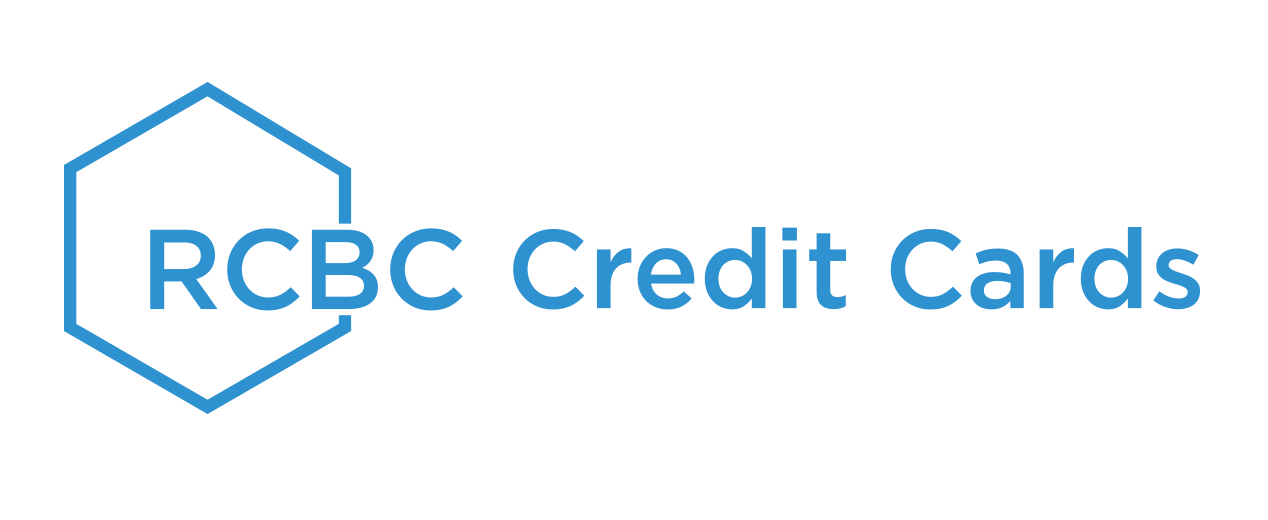
- Industry: Credit card issuer
- Founded: December 4, 1981 (as PCI Credit Card, Inc.)
- Products: Credit cards
- Owner: Yuchengco Group of Companies
- Parent: Rizal Commercial Banking Corporation (since 2000); PCI Bank (Equitable PCI Bank) (1981-2000)
- Website: rcbccredit.com

RCBC Credit Cards (previously RCBC Bankard (PSE: BKD)) is one of the largest credit card issuers in the Philippines, issuing VISA, MasterCard, JCB and UnionPay (CUP) credit cards. In the 1990s, they also issued their line of credit and debit cards.

== History ==
Bankard, Incorporated was organized by Philippine Commercial International Bank, or PCI Bank on December 4, 1981, as the Philippine Commercial Credit Card, Inc. (PCCCI) to operate a domestic credit card operation. It started full commercial operations in June 1982. PCCCI's affiliation with PCIBank gave it the distinction of being the first credit card company in the Philippines issued by a commercial bank. In July 1992, PCCCI changed its name to Bankard, Inc.

On June 20, 1991, PCIBank was granted a license by MasterCard International to issue credit cards in the Philippines accepted by the MasterCard network of affiliated banks and establishments worldwide. In 1994, PCIBank turned over the management and ownership of the MasterCard portfolio. This was to issue and acquire business to Bankard, Inc.

In March 1995, Bankard, Inc. was publicly listed in the Philippine Stock Exchange, becoming the first credit card company to be listed in the Philippines. It was also only the second company to achieve this distinction in the Asia-Pacific region.

Also, in March 1995, Bankard, Inc. became the first credit card company to offer both dollar (PCIBank MasterCard) and peso (Bankard MasterCard) payment billing options.

In May 1995, Visa International granted Bankard, Inc. the license to acquire merchant billings and to issue credit cards carrying the Visa brand.

When PCI Bank merged with Equitable Bank to form Equitable PCI Bank, the new Equitable PCI chose to keep Equitable Bank's credit card arm, Equitable Card Network, rather than to incorporate Bankard into Equitable's credit card operations.

In 2000, majority of Bankard was sold to the Yuchengco Group of Companies, owner of Rizal Commercial Banking Corporation (RCBC).

RCBC's credit card operations, RCBC Card, were subsequently merged into Bankard, forming the current company. Through RCBC Card, Bankard also started issuing JCB cards. Bankard was two-thirds owned by the Yuchengco Group of Companies and is an affiliate of RCBC. However, this was set to change after the Yuchengco Group of Companies accepted a buyout offer from GE Consumer Finance for an undisclosed price, subject to stockholder approval. In the past, YGC had sought to nullify its acquisition on the grounds that it paid Equitable PCI Bank too much.

In 2007, the company rebranded from Bankard to RCBC Bankard after the sale of the entire Bankard business to RCBC was concluded in December 2006. GE Money failed to acquire Bankard from RCBC.

On September 29, 2022, RCBC Bankard rebranded itself to RCBC Credit Cards.

== See also ==
- Equitable PCI Bank
- Rizal Commercial Banking Corporation
