= Al-Amanah Islamic Bank =

Islamic bank in the Philippines

Al-Amanah Islamic Investment Bank of the Philippines
- Formerly: Philippine Amanah Bank
- Type: Subsidiary
- Industry: Banking
- Founded: Manila, Philippines (August 2, 1973; 53 years ago)
- Headquarters: Zamboanga City, Philippines
- Key people: Amenah Pangandaman (Chairman and CEO)
- Products: Financial services
- Parent: Development Bank of the Philippines
- Website: amanahbank.gov.ph

The Al-Amanah Islamic Investment Bank of the Philippines (AAIIBP; Filipino: Bangko sa Pamumuhunang Al-Amanah Islamiko ng Pilipinas), or simply the Al-Amanah Islamic Bank, is the first and only Islamic bank in the Philippines.

== History ==
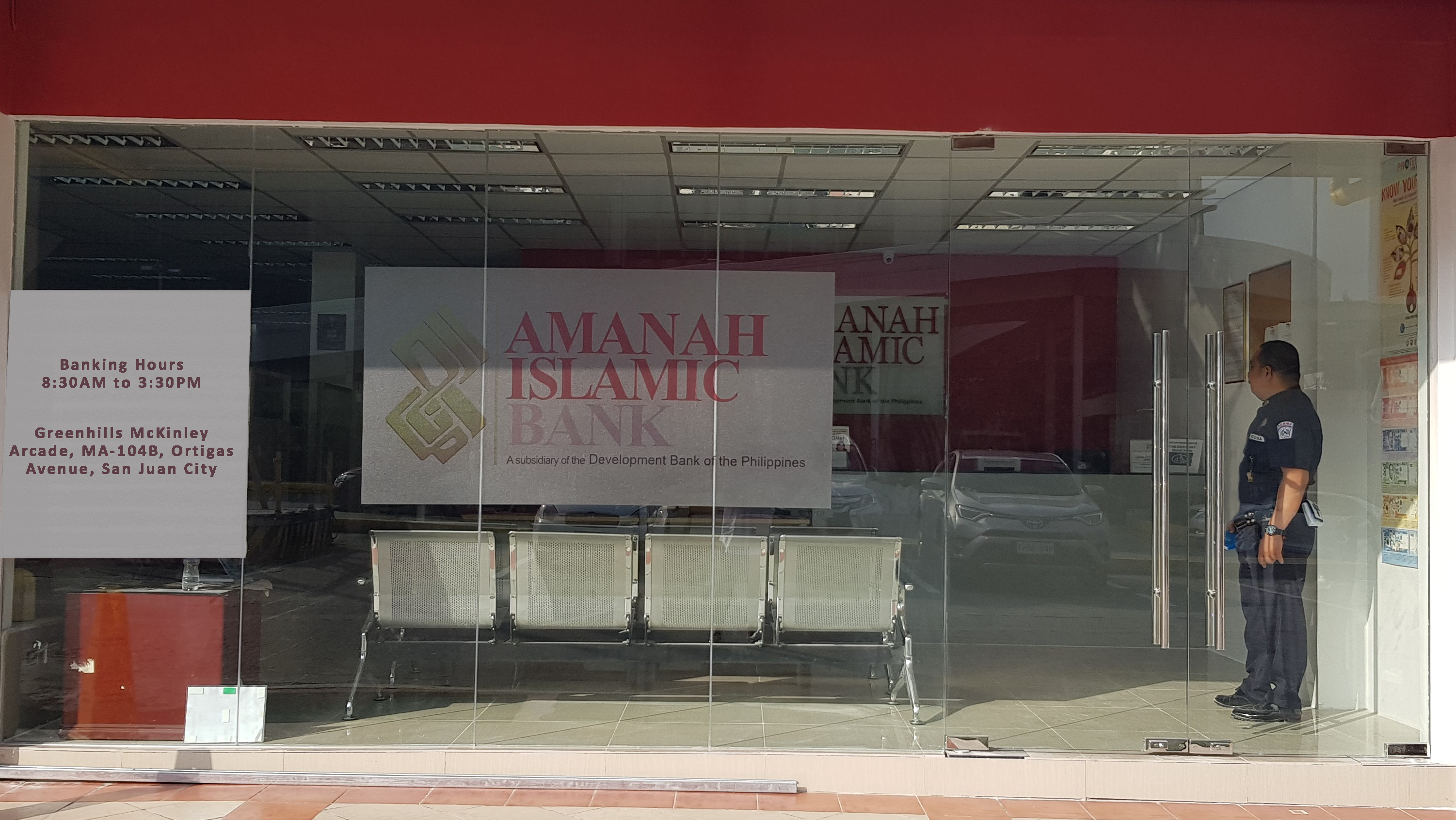
An Al-Amanah Islamic Bank branch in San Juan, Metro Manila

Al-Amanah Islamic Bank traces its roots to the Philippine Amanah Bank, established by President Ferdinand Marcos in 1973 by virtue of Presidential Decree No. 264. With an initial capital of ₱100 million, it was one of the world's first Islamic banks. Its charter originally mandated it to provide financial services to the provinces of Basilan, Cotabato, Lanao del Norte, Lanao del Sur, Palawan, Sulu, Tawi-Tawi, Zamboanga del Norte and Zamboanga del Sur, where there are large, if not predominant, Muslim populations.

In 1974, the bank's charter was amended by Presidential Decree No. 542, allowing it to open branches in Maguindanao and Sultan Kudarat. The amended charter also mandated that the bank provide banking services according to Islamic principles, which was not explicitly provided for under the original charter.

In 1989, the bank was re-chartered and re-capitalized pursuant to Republic Act No. 6848, and was subsequently renamed Al-Amanah Islamic Investment Bank of the Philippines, with a capital of ₱1 billion. Between 1990 and 2007, the bank was under the supervision of the Bureau of the Treasury.

The bank was sold to another government-owned bank, the Development Bank of the Philippines (DBP) in 2008. However, in 2012, DBP announced that it intended to divest itself of the bank, since it does not have the expertise to handle an Islamic financial institution.

In 2015, Al-Amanah opened its first branch outside of its main service area of Mindanao. The new branch was opened in Malabon, a city in the northern part of Metro Manila.

In 2016, Al-Amanah was granted a license to offer electronic banking services by the Bangko Sentral ng Pilipinas (BSP). This allowed the bank to expand its reach beyond its physical branches and offer services such as online banking and mobile banking.

Al-Amanah introduced its Islamic Pawnshop in 2018, offering financing to customers through the application of Islamic pawnbroking principles. The main focus of the pawnshop is to address the needs of customers who require short-term financing options while avoiding interest-based transactions.

Al-Amanah entered into a memorandum of understanding with the Department of Education in 2019 to provide financial literacy programs to public school students. The objective of the program is to promote financial inclusion and enhance the students' knowledge on the fundamentals of banking and finance.

On September 3, 2024, the Intergovernmental Fiscal Policy Board (IFPB) approved Bangsamoro Autonomous Region in Muslim Mindanao Government's purchase of 80 percent of AAIIBP from the Development Bank of the Philippines (DBP).

== Ownership ==
- Bangsamoro Government : 80.00%
- Development Bank of the Philippines: 19.96%
