= Expressnet =

- Operating area: Philippines
- Members: 5
- ATMs: 2,213
- Founded: 1986

Expressnet is an interbank network connecting the ATM networks of seven major banks in the Philippines. It has the second-largest number of ATMs (largely due to the vast nationwide presence of Bank of the Philippine Islands Express Teller ATMs) and the smallest number of customers and member banks. However, its strength among the interbank networks and the ubiquity of BPI ATMs have given birth to the Expressnet motto: "The Powerful Connection".

At present, Expressnet has 3.5 million customers and has 2,213 ATMs operating 24 hours a day.

It has been reported that lock, stock and barrel of Expressnet has been purchased by rival interbank network BancNet. The Expressnet brand is slowly being retired as a result, and recent BPI promotional collateral no longer shows Expressnet info and membership, particularly in their new releases of BPI Express Teller cards (where BPI no longer lists itself as a member of Expressnet). Full integration of its current infrastructure to the BancNet system is expected to be completed by mid-2016.

== History ==
Expressnet was founded on February 14, 1986, when the ATMs of Bank of the Philippine Islands (BPI) and its subsidiary, BPI Family Savings Bank, were connected for the first time. The first Expressnet transaction was also conducted that same year.

Soon thereafter, in December 1991, Landbank joined the consortium, followed by HSBC Philippines in February 1992. Banco de Oro joined in April 1995, BPI Direct Savings Bank (a BPI subsidiary), joined in 2000 and HSBC Savings Bank, an HSBC subsidiary, became the latest Expressnet member on April 1, 2001.

Expressnet and another Philippine interbank network, MegaLink, formed an alliance on May 6, 1997, with the main ceremony held at Ayala Center. This meant that 2.3 million Expressnet cardholders could use their cards with MegaLink ATMs, and 2.7 million MegaLink cardholders could use their cards with Expressnet ATMs.

On July 13, 2005, Expressnet and BancNet signed a memorandum by executives of both networks. In 2008, Expressnet outsourced its ATM operations to BancNet. On January 30, 2015, BancNet and MegaLink announced their merger, switching operations to one entity (Bancnet).

Expressnet is known for its Express Payment System (EPS), which was at first the debit card system of the BPI Express Teller ATM card. In 2005, the network expanded to include cardholders of all Landbank E.A.S.Y. (Express Access for Savers like You) and Banco de Oro (local and international) ATM cards.

== Members ==
Expressnet is the primary network of the following banks listed below:

- Banco de Oro (formerly a member of MegaLink, now BancNet) - April 1995
- Bank of the Philippine Islands and subsidiaries BPI Direct Savings Bank and BPI Family Savings Bank (also a member of BancNet) - February 14, 1986
- Land Bank of the Philippines (now a member of BancNet) - December 1991

== Connectivity ==
All Expressnet ATM cardholders and a majority of Expressnet ATMs are connected to MegaLink and BancNet, the other Philippine interbank networks. All Expressnet cardholders can access MegaLink and BancNet-connected ATMs and vice versa.

However, not all Expressnet ATMs are linked to MegaLink and BancNet. Prominent examples of this include Landbank and HSBC, but the BPI group and Banco de Oro are accessible to MegaLink cardholders.

An agreement was signed though between BancNet and Expressnet to interconnect. The first bank to make such an announcement about the BancNet-Expressnet tie-up was Chinabank, of which its sister bank, Banco de Oro, is a member of Expressnet.

Internationally, Expressnet cardholders (excluding Landbank and local BPI and Banco de Oro cardholders) are connected to Maestro and Cirrus in the cases of BPI and Banco de Oro and PLUS. Expressnet ATMs link to the same with BDO ATMs also providing access to American Express, Japan Credit Bureau (JCB), Mastercard, Visa and Visa Electron cardholders.

== Former members ==
- Banco de Oro (transfer to MegaLink, later BancNet)
- BPI (transfer to BancNet)
- HSBC Philippines (transfer to BancNet)
- Landbank (transfer to BancNet)

== See also ==
- BancNet
- ENS
- MegaLink
- Nationlink
- ATM usage fees
