= MegaLink =

- Product type: Online bank
- Country: Philippines
- Introduced: 1989; 37 years ago
- Discontinued: 2015; 11 years ago
- Markets: 8 members with 3,413 ATMs across the Philippines
- Website: http://www.megalink.com.ph/

MegaLink (also spelled as Megalink) is a Philippine-based developer of mobile and banking software as well as a service provider for banks, specifically for Automatic Teller Machine (ATM) networks and point of sale systems for banks. It was established in 1989; it was later repurposed in 2015.

== History ==
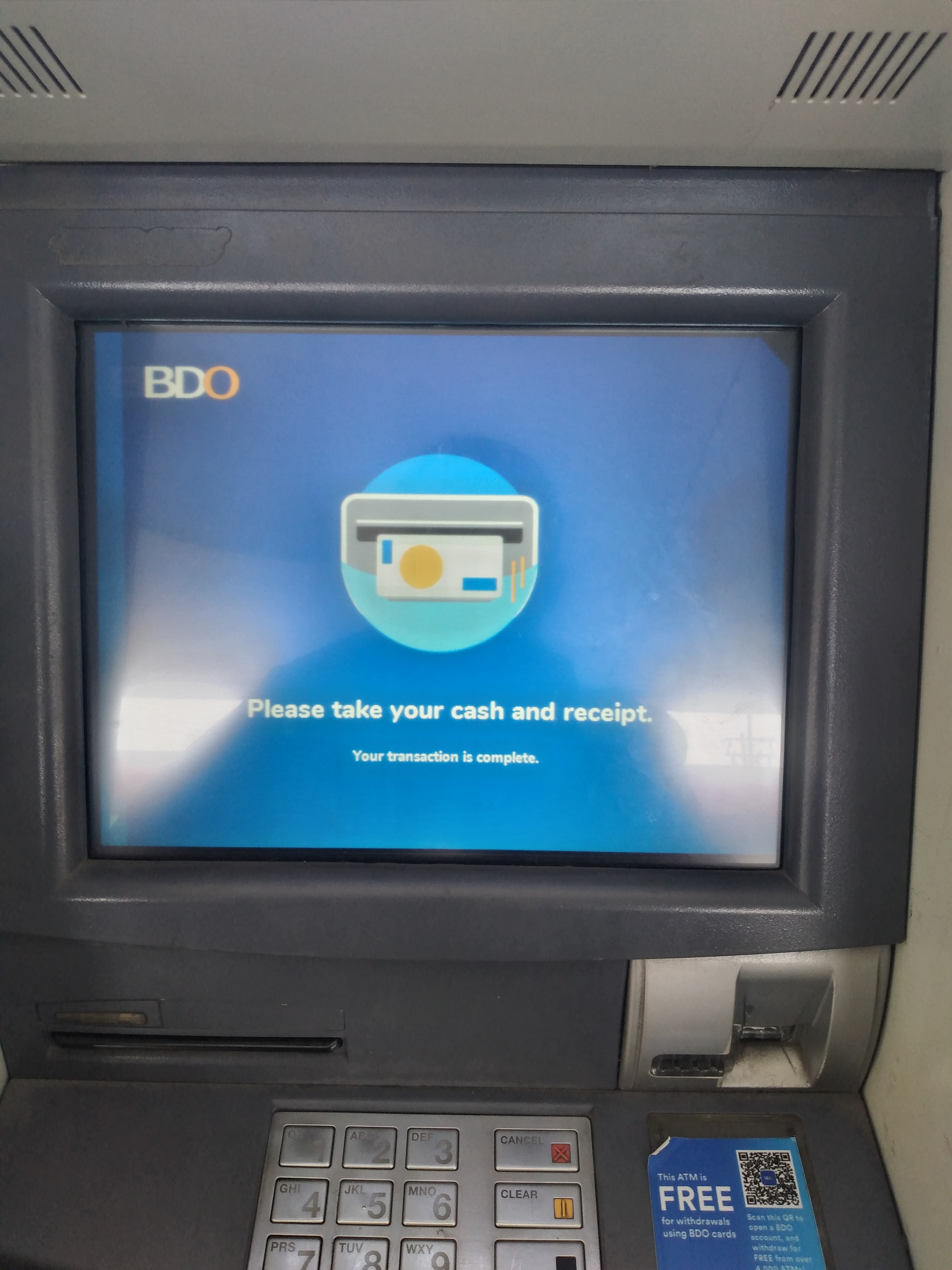
Interface of a BDO Unibank ATM in Bacoor, Philippines. BDO Unibank, an original MegaLink member bank, retains the use of MegaLink nomenclature and design in its software despite its mandated transfer to BancNet.

MegaLink was formed in September 1989 by Equitable Banking Corporation (now merged with Banco de Oro), Far East Bank and Trust Company (now part of BPI), Philippine National Bank (currently a BancNet member), and United Coconut Planters Bank.

MegaLink was launched on March 19, 1990. MegaLink was linked with both BancNet and Expressnet.

In 1995, MegaLink forged an alliance with BancNet. In 2003, MegaLink launched an Electronic Settlement with the Bangko Sentral ng Pilipinas. In 2006, the ATM Industry Association (ATMIA) signed up MegaLink as a founding member in the Philippines. In 2011, MegaLink was interconnected with the Korea Financial Telecommunications and Clearings Institute (KFTC) in South Korea.

In late January 2015, MegaLink and BancNet announced their merger. BancNet is the sole surviving entity, while MegaLink has been repurposed. MegaLink now lists itself as a BancNet member under the independent ATM deployer category. Following the repurposing, MegaLink and its assets were sold to the Japanese conglomerate Hitachi, of which MegaLink is now a subsidiary.

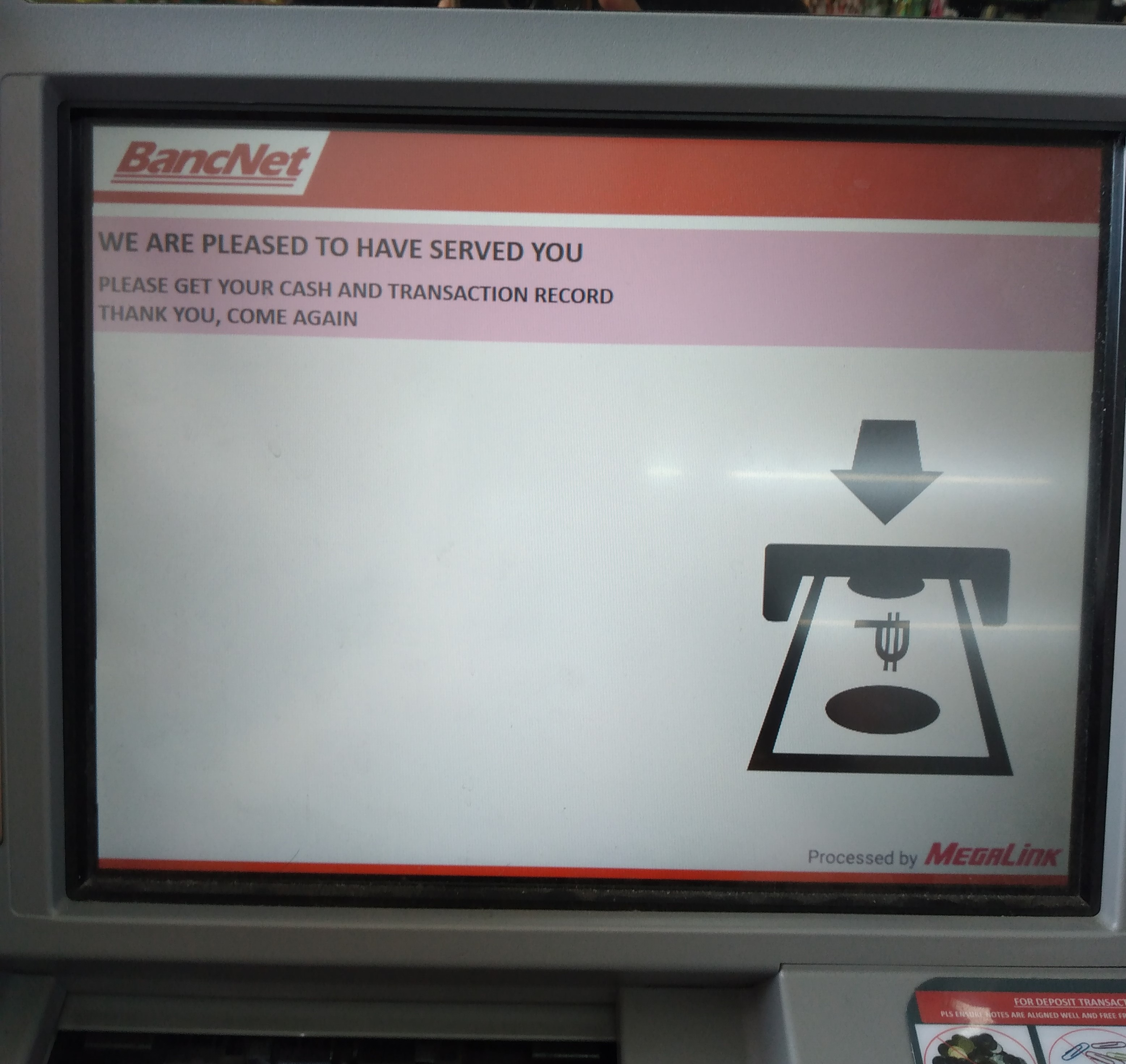
Interface of a MegaLink-deployed BancNet ATM at a SevenBank ATM in Parañaque, Philippines. This ATM is using on-screen software standardized by BancNet.

== See also ==
- BancNet (the surviving ATM network in the Philippines)
- Expressnet (MegaLink's alliance member, also absorbed by BancNet)
- ATM usage fees
- ENS
