= 2016 in Philippine law and politics =

The following are the events in related to Philippine law in 2016. This includes developments in criminal investigations of national notability.

== Events ==
=== Ferdinand Marcos wealth ===
- January 4 – The Sandiganbayan Special Second Division has finally ordered Alfonso Lim Sr., a crony of the late president Ferdinand Marcos, to return to the government all properties he acquired.
- April 20 – The Sandiganbayan Special Fourth Division has acquitted former Presidential Commission on Good Government (PCGG) chairman Camilo Sabio from graft and malversation of public funds cases, which stemmed from his alleged misuse of almost P12 million worth of recovered ill-gotten wealth of the Marcoses.
- June 14 – The two Cessna aircraft sequestered from the late Alfonso Lim, an alleged crony of the Marcos family, is sold by the Sandiganbayan at a measly amount of P140,000.

=== Jejomar Binay alleged corruption probe ===
- January 26 – The Senate Blue Ribbon subcommittee concludes its hearings on the corruption allegations against Vice President and UNA presidential candidate Jejomar Binay.
- February 19 – The Office of the Ombudsman files graft and documents falsification charges before the Sandiganbayan against former Makati City mayor Junjun Binay and 22 others over the alleged overpriced construction of the Makati City Hall Parking Building II.
- July 14 – The Office of the Ombudsman files graft, falsification and violation of the government procurement law charges against former Vice President Jejomar Binay in connection with the overpricing of the Makati City Hall Building II project.

=== Priority Development Assistance Fund scam ===
- January 7 – The Sandiganbayan Fifth Division has denied the bail petition of Senator Jinggoy Estrada in connection with his alleged involvement in the PDAF scam.
- March 3 – The Office of the Ombudsman files charges against five former Representatives including former Muntinlupa congressman Ruffy Biazon, in connection with the PDAF scam.
- March 15 – Former Bukidnon Rep. Candido Pancrudo Jr. and five other individuals were charged with graft and malversation over their alleged involvement in the PDAF scam.
- April 6 – A group calling itself iBalik ang Bilyones ng Mamamayan (iBBM) filed a complaint for plunder against Senator Bongbong Marcos for his alleged involvement in the PDAF scam.
- April 12 – The Office of the Ombudsman has formally filed graft and malversation charges against former Oriental Mindoro Representative Rodolfo Valencia and 16 other individuals over their alleged involvement in the PDAF scam.
- April 13 – The Sandidganbayan Fifth Division grants the petitions for bail of former APEC party-list Representative Edgar Valdez, former Masbate Representative Rizalina Lanete and Janet Lim Napoles who were facing plunder charges in connection with the PDAF scam.
- April 14 – Former Davao del Sur Rep. Marc Douglas Cagas IV and former Energy Regulatory Commission (ERC) chairperson Zenaida Ducut, along with 23 other individuals, are charged with graft and malversation of public funds in connection with their alleged involvement in the PDAF scam.
- May 2 – The Office of the Ombudsman has formally filed criminal charges against former South Cotabato representative Arthur Pingoy Jr., former Energy Regulatory Commission chairman Zenaida Ducut and several other former government officials in connection with their alleged involvement in the pork barrel scam.
- July 12 – The Supreme Court upheld its decision granting a bail plea of former Senator Juan Ponce Enrile.
- July 13
  - The Office of the Ombudsman has ordered the filing of charges for graft and malversation against former Nueva Ecija fourth district Rep. Rodolfo Antonino for his alleged involvement in the pork barrel scam.
  - Ombudsman Conchita Carpio Morales has ordered the filing of graft, malversation, and direct bribery charges against detained Davao del Sur governor Douglas Cagas Sr., for his involvement in the Priority Development Assistance Fund scam.

=== Mamasapano clash ===
- February 5 – The Volunteers Against Crime and Corruption (VACC) files the usurpation case against former PNP Chief Alan Purisima due to usurping his role in his involvement in the Mamasapano clash.
- April 5 – The Office of the Ombudsman finds probable cause to file charges against former PNP chief Alan Purisima and former SAF director Getulio Napeñas for the Mamasapano operation that saw 44 SAF troopers killed, the biggest loss of the police in recent history.

=== 2015 Iglesia ni Cristo leadership controversy ===
- January 20 – Former Iglesia ni Cristo evangelical worker Lowell Menorca II is arrested by Manila Police District policemen in civil clothes without any warrant of arrest showed due to libel charges filed by SCAN International Lanao del Norte chapter while he trying to attend a hearing in Court of Appeals. The INC categorically denied the involvement in commotion between the policemen and Menorca.
- April 26 – The Court of Appeals has dismissed the writ of amparo petition for the protection of former Iglesia ni Cristo minister Lowell Menorca II and his family.
- June 17 – The Manila Metropolitan Trial Court (MTC) Branch 12, has ordered the two siblings of Iglesia ni Cristo executive minister Eduardo V. Manalo, expelled members Angel and Lottie, to vacant from a property of the religious sect in No. 36 Tandang Sora Street, Quezon City.
- July 19 – The Quezon City Regional Trial Court Branch 96 recovered five of the 16 vehicles registered under the name of Iglesia ni Cristo inside of its property at no. 36 Tandang Sora Avenue, Quezon City.

=== 2016 Philippine election ===
- February 3 – The COMELEC 1st Division denied all the disqualification cases against PDP–Laban presidential candidate Davao City Mayor Rodrigo Duterte.
- March 8 – Voted 9–6, the Supreme Court has affirms Grace Poe's natural-born status and declares she is qualified to run based on her 10-year residency.
- March 29 – The Commission on Elections has decided not to stop the broadcast of senatorial candidate Manny Pacquiao's boxing match on April 9.
- April 7 – Neil Llamanzares, the husband of presidential candidate and senator Grace Poe, formally renounces his American citizenship before a barangay chairman in San Juan City. Neil Llamanzares' American citizenship has been a subject of controversy among Grace Poe's critics.
- April 9 – The Supreme Court declares that their vote on Grace Poe's natural-born status and 10-year residency is final and executory and she is eligible to become president.
- April 17 – Presidential frontrunner Rodrigo Duterte causes controversy when a video of him making a joke about the rape of a murdered Australian missionary goes viral.
- April 27 – Voted 4–3, the COMELEC en banc has officially cancelled the voting on the selected malls scheduled on May 9.
- May 2 – Vice presidential candidate and senator Antonio Trillanes IV and attorney Sal Panelo, lawyer of presidential frontrunner and Davao City Mayor Rodrigo Duterte, visits the Bank of the Philippine Islands branch along Julia Vargas Avenue in Pasig, in a bid to settle the lawmaker's allegations of hidden wealth against the mayor.
- May 5 – A negative advertisement, paid by Antonio Trillanes IV, targeted presidential candidate Rodrigo Duterte using children was aired, causing dismay among netizens. A 72-hour TRO was issued by Regional Trial Court in Taguig City to stop any TV stations from airing the negative advertisement.
- May 31 – The Supreme Court dismisses the appeal of former MMDA chairman and senatorial candidate Francis Tolentino to stop the proclamation of Sherwin Gatchalian, Ralph Recto and Leila de Lima, the top 10, 11 and 12 senators in the 2016 Philippine Senate election respectively.
- June 7 – The Supreme Court dismisses the petition filed by attorney Elly Pamatong, a presidential candidate classified as nuisance that seeks to null and void the votes of President-elect Rodrigo Duterte and to stop his proclamation by the National Board of Canvassers.
- June 14 – The Supreme Court dismisses a petition that sought to stop the lease of 70,977 optical mark reader (OMR) machines for P6.286 billion that were used in the May 2016 elections.
- June 16 – The COMELEC en banc grants the Liberal Party's request and several similar petitions that they be allowed to file their statement of contributions and expenses (SOCE) beyond the June 8 deadline long before the May 9 elections.
- June 21 – The Commission on Elections en banc accepts the resignation of senior Commissioner Christian Robert Lim as head of the Campaign Finance Office (CFO), following the extension of the filing of their statements of contributions and expenditures.
- June 28 – The Supreme Court has dismissed a petition filed by retired Army Col. Justino Padiernos and attorney Manuelito Luna, questioning the Commission on Elections' decision to extend the filing of the statements of contributions and expenditures of candidates and political parties in the 2016 election.
- August 4 – The Parish Pastoral Council for Responsible Voting (PPCRV) paid a courtesy call to President Rodrigo Duterte. PPCRV National Chair Ambassador Henrietta de Villa called on President Duterte to end the corrupt practice of vote-buying and vote-selling during elections.

=== Implementation of Freedom of Information ===
- July 23 – President Duterte signs his second executive order for the implementation of the Freedom of Information (FOI) in the Executive branch.
- July 27 – Executive Order No. 2, issued 23 July 2016, was published in the Manila Bulletin newspaper, marking the first day that all government offices under the Executive Branch to prepare its own People's FOI Manual and formulate its implementing details.
- July 28 – Symbolic turnover of the Freedom of Information Executive Order, E.O. No. 2, by Executive Secretary Medialdea to the members of the Right to Know Coalition, represented by Malou Mangahas.
- December 29 – Secretary Medialdea issues Memorandum Order No. 10, designating the Presidential Communications Operations Office as lead agency in the implementation of EO No. 2 and the FOI program in the Executive Branch.

=== NPA encounters ===
- July 25 – President Duterte delivers his first State of the Nation Address (SONA). In this SONA, President Duterte declared the truce between the government and the NPA, lamenting the heavy and tragic cost of armed rebellion.
- July 27 – The NPA carried out an ambush on government militias in Kapalong, Davao del Norte.
- July 28 – President Duterte expressed his disappointment with the NPA who ambushed a Citizen Armed Force Geographical Unit (CAFGU) in Davao del Norte resulting to the death of the CAFGU member and wounding four others.
- July 29 – President Duterte spoke to members of the CAFGU during the wake of the slain CAFGU member held at the 60th Infantry Brigade headquarters in Asuncion, Davao del Norte.
- July 30 – President Duterte lifted the government's unilateral ceasefire with the NPA.

==== Compostela Valley encounters ====
- August 4 – The Charlie Company 25IB figured in a 15-minute firefight against the New People's Army (NPA) at Km 56, Brgy. Rizal, Monkayo, Compostela Valley after they responded to the complaint of the community being intimidated and coerced by the NPA.
- August 5 – The pursuing troops of 25IB had a 45-minute skirmish in Brgy. Rizal against around 60 NPAs who were utilizing improvised explosive devices. On a separate incident in Brgy. Parasanon, Maragusan, the troops of 71st Infantry Battalion engaged in a firefight around 30 NPA belonging to Guerilla Front 27, Southern Mindanao Regional Committee at Purok 5 of the said barangay.
- August 6 – The Armed Forces of the Philippines’ Eastern Mindanao Command condemns “in the highest form” the deliberate use of land mine by the NPAs which is in violation of the International Humanitarian Law.
- August 7 – President Duterte issued an ultimatum against the NPA's use of land mines and demanded inclusion of the battlefield issue in the peace talks between the government and the NPA, or else the negotiations are off.

==== Oslo peace talks ====
- August 19 – The Government of the Philippines Peace Panel Chair and Labor Secretary Silvestre Bello III expressed disappointment over the ambush of government troops by members of the NPA.
- August 20 – The Philippine government and the Communist Party of the Philippines-New Peoples Army-National Democratic Front peace talks in Oslo continued as scheduled.

=== War against illegal drugs ===
- July 5 – President Rodrigo Duterte, in his speech during the 66th Anniversary of the Philippine Air Force names 5 top police generals who allegedly involved in illegal drug trade.
- July 9 – Presidential Spokesperson Ernesto Abella said the proposed mandatory drug testing for government employees could regain lost public trust.
- August 7
  - The militant group Bayan insisted that it might be too premature to blame President Duterte for the surge in the number of suspected drug personalities killed in police operations.
  - President Duterte released a list of 150 officials from the various branches of the government. The list includes former and active officials from the police, the judiciary, and local governments.
- August 8 – The United States, through a statement of the U.S. State Department, showed concern about the extrajudicial killings in the Philippines, where officials say more than 400 suspected drug dealers have been killed by the police since President Duterte took over.
- August 9
  - Secretary Abella states that President Duterte repeatedly expressed that he does not condone extrajudicial killings. However, President Duterte has also admitted that certain individuals may have been salvaged. Interior Secretary Ismael Sueño has directed the Philippine National Police (PNP) Chief General Ronald dela Rosa to investigate the drug-related killings.
  - In response to a statement of Supreme Court Chief Justice Ma. Lourdes Sereno, President Duterte has asked that the judges to make reference to the Supreme Court, and that they relate within their own branch. According to Secretary Abella, President Duterte "is calling attention to the clear and present danger of drugs, and that it is his moral obligation to make sure that the public is properly warned of the drug menace. It is part of his duty to warn the citizens against those who present a clear and present danger to society."
- August 21
  - President Duterte warned all officials connected to the National Penitentiary down to the supervisors and prison guards that they will be charged if they do not tell the truth about the drug manufacturing and trafficking that was happening at the National Penitentiary during the previous administration.
  - President Duterte lambasted the United Nations (UN) when it's rapporteurs attributed the rising death toll to the extrajudicial killings under his administration's intensified war against illegal drugs.
- August 22 – Interior Secretary Sueno revealed that his department is ready to file charges against PNP Director Joel Pagdilao and Chief Superintendent Edgardo Tinio, who were mentioned by President Duterte as among the alleged protectors of drug syndicates.
- August 23
  - President Duterte rallies the armed forces to fight the culture of corruption and illegal drugs. In his speech before the oath taking ceremony of 75 newly promoted generals and flag officers of the Armed Forces of the Philippines, President Duterte stressed that he wants to hand over to the next generation of Filipinos a government that is drug free and clean, ending the culture of corruption.
  - According to Foreign Secretary Perfecto Yasay Jr., President Duterte remains committed to the UN despite his disappointment over its supposed meddling in the affairs of the country.
- August 30 – Secretary Abella states that the campaign against drugs has been successful, with a record of more than 600,000 illegal drug surrenderees as proof of its effectivity.
- September 15 – Presidential Communications Secretary Martin Andanar said that the campaign against illegal drugs is gaining ground as more people attest to safer streets in Metro Manila.
- September 22 – President Duterte urges cops in Cagayan de Oro to continue the fight against illegal drugs. He also vowed to protect the policemen from prosecution if ever they are charged for violating the law while performing their duties.
- September 23 – President Duterte commended the Police Regional Office in General Santos City for a job well done under the “Project Double Barrel” anti-illegal drugs operations conducted in the region. In his speech, President Duterte defended the PNP against criticisms of alleged extrajudicial killings.
- September 27
  - President Duterte ordered the immediate sequestration and the confiscation of the clandestine drug laboratory discovered by joint operatives of the Armed Forces of the Philippines, Philippine Drug Enforcement Agency, PNP, and the local government unit of Arayat, Pampanga. He divulged that the discovery of the laboratory, which is a major accomplishment in relation to the war on drugs, is connected to the Bilibid network where the drug lords are detained.
  - President Duterte urged the Philippine Marines to stay loyal to the Republic and help to fight the country's drug problem.
- October 11 – President Duterte issues Executive Order No. 4, which provides for the establishment and support of drug abuse treatment and rehabilitation centers throughout the Philippines.

==== Kidnapping and killing of Jee Ick-Joo ====
- October 18 – South Korean Jee Ick-Joo, a businessman, along with Marissa Dawis, his house helper, was reportedly kidnapped by two unidentified men from their residence in Friendship Plaza Subdivision, Angeles City. After their arrest, the kidnappers, who turned out to be members of the PNP, accused Jee of being involved in the illegal drug trade.
- October 19 – The house helper was released by the kidnappers. She became the main witness in the case.
- October 30 – Jee's wife, Choi Kyung-jin, made the statement that one of the kidnappers, Patrick Joseph Banez demanded a ransom of ₱8 million, and she reportedly paid ₱5 million.

==== Death of Mayor Rolando Espinosa ====
- August 7 – Rolando Espinosa, mayor of Albuera, Leyte, was included in the "drug list" of President Duterte.
- August 10 – The PNP raided the house of Mayor Espinosa which yielded 11 kilos of suspected methamphetamine worth an estimated ₱88 million, and high-powered weapons.
- October 5 – Mayor Espinosa was arrested in connection with violations of the Comprehensive Dangerous Drugs Act of 2002 and for illegal possession of firearms and ammunition, which stemmed from the raid last August 10.
- November 5 – According to the initial police report, Mayor Espinosa along with another detainee, Raul Yap, were killed inside his jail cell while the personnel from the Criminal Investigation and Detection Group (CIDG) was trying to serve a search warrant for both detainees. Mayor Espinosa and Yap resisted arrest which resulted to a firefight killing them both, according to the reports.

=== Lawless violence in Mindanao ===
- August 29 – At least 15 soldiers die in a skirmish with the Abu Sayyaf Group in Patikul, Sulu.
- August 31 – President Duterte visited the wake of the killed in action soldiers in Zamboanga City and extended his grief in his speech and condemnation against the Abu Sayyaf.
- September 2 – At least 14 people were killed and 67 others were seriously injured in a bombing incident in a night market in Davao City.
- September 4 – President Duterte declares a state of national emergency on account of lawless violence in Mindanao. He also commanded the Armed Forces of the Philippines and the PNP to undertake measures to suppress any and all forms of lawless violence in Mindanao and to prevent them from spreading and escalating elsewhere in the Philippines.
- September 7 – Executive Secretary Salvador Medialdea promulgated the directives and guidelines for the Armed Forces of the Philippines and the PNP in the implementation of the measures to suppress and prevent lawless violence.
- September 19 – President Duterte extends financial assistance to Davao blast victims. He personally received each of the victims and relatives of the deceased and handed over a check representing the cash assistance extended by the government amounting to ₱250,000 for victims who were permanently disabled by the blast, handed out ₱250,000 each to the families of the 15 victims who died in the bombing, while ₱100,000 cash assistance was also given to each of the victims who sustained minor injuries plus other medical assistance, including allowances for antibiotics.

=== Others ===
==== January ====
- January 20 – The Office of the Ombudsman orders effectively the dismissal in service of Quezon City District 2 Councilor Roderick Paulate and District 1 Councilor Francisco Calalay and two city liaison officials on the hiring of "ghost employees" in 2010.
- January 22 – Lt. Col. Ferdinand Marcelino, a former official of the Philippine Drug Enforcement Agency's Special Enforcement Service, is arrested in a buy-bust operation in a shabu laboratory in Sta. Cruz, Manila.
- January 31 – In the latest report by the International Federation of Journalists (IFJ), the Philippines places second in the list of most dangerous places for journalists.

==== February ====
- February 1 – The Makati Regional Trial Court Branch 142 issues a warrant of arrest against senator and vice presidential candidate Antonio Trillanes IV over the libel case filed by disqualified Makati Mayor Jejomar Binay, Jr. On February 9, Trillanes posted bail.

==== March ====
- March 5 – The Ombudsman has ordered the dismissal of Valenzuela City Mayor Rex Gatchalian and 6 others over the deadly blaze that hit footwear factory Kentex Manufacturing Corporation, killing at least 72 people in May last year. On March 15, The Ombudsman also ordered the filing of graft charges against Gatchalian and seven other individuals in connection with this case.
- March 15
  - The Supreme Court dismisses several petitions by several party-list groups to issue a TRO to stop the implementation of the K+12 education program of the Department of Education.
  - The Senate Blue Ribbon Committee has begun its inquiry into the alleged money laundering of $100 million that has dragged into this one of the country's leading financial institutions.
- March 16
  - BIR employee Rhodora Alvarez, who blew the whistle on the alleged anomalous deal, filed a plunder complaint against Defense Secretary Voltaire Gazmin over a P1.2 billion helicopter deal in 2013.
  - Disqualified Laguna Governor Emilio Ramon "ER" Ejercito and eight other individuals were charged with graft before the Sandiganbayan over an alleged anomalous insurance deal entered in 2008.
- March 18 – Former Camarines Norte Governor Roy Padilla Jr., is arrested over his failure to return a firearm issued to him in 1992.
- March 22
  - The Sandiganbayan Second Division has dismissed the graft case against Government Service Insurance System (GSIS) former president and general manager Winston Garcia on the alleged anomalous awarding of a multimillion-peso electronic membership card (e-Card) project in 2004.
  - The Court of Appeals (CA) has junked dismissed Makati mayor Junjun Binay's contempt charges against former interior secretary Mar Roxas, Ombudsman Conchita Carpio Morales, former justice Secretary Leila de Lima, and 5 others.
- March 28 – Laguna Lake Development Authority (LLDA) general manager Neric Acosta has been sentenced to a maximum of 10 years of imprisonment after being found guilty of one count of graft by the Sandiganbayan Fourth Division in connection with the misuse of his pork barrel funds as district representative of Bukidnon.
- March 30 – The Office of the Ombudsman filed graft and technical malversation cases against Sen. JV Ejercito, before the Sandiganbayan over the alleged anomalous purchase of high-powered firearms worth P2.1 million during his term as mayor of San Juan City.
- March 31
  - The camp of businessman Kim Wong handed over to the Bangko Sentral ng Pilipinas, the $4.6 million he volunteered to return to the Bangladesh government, supposedly after learning that the money was part of the $81-million money laundering scheme. On April 4, Wong turned over an additional P38.28 million to the Anti-Money Laundering Council (AMLC) office. On April 19, Eastern Hawaii Leisure Co. Ltd., the company of casino junket operator Kim Wong has turned over P200 million to the AMLC.
  - Addong Salahuddin, suspect in the bombing incident at the Zamboanga City Airport on August 5, 2010, where two people were killed and 28 others injured, including former Sulu Gov. Abdusakur Tan has surrendered to the National Bureau of Investigation.
  - For failure to exhaust all available administrative remedies, the Court of Appeals has dismissed the Philippine Heart Center's (PHC) bid for exemption from payment of real property tax.

==== April ====
- April 4 – The Olongapo Regional Trial Court Branch 74 denies the petition of US Marine Joseph Scott Pemberton to reverse his conviction for his homicide case of Filipino transgender Jennifer Laude.
- April 5 – The Ombudsman orders the filing of graft charges against re-electionist Cebu 3rd District Rep. Gwendolyn Garcia and 11 other former officials over the alleged anomalous construction of the P833-million Cebu International Convention Center (CICC) in 2006.
- April 19 – Lester Ivan Rivera, a former bank security guard was found guilty of three counts of rape with homicide with theft and sentenced to three life imprisonment terms in connection with the 2011 rape-slay case of University of the Philippines Los Baños (UPLB) student Given Grace Cebanico.

==== May ====
- May 6
  - Ombudsman Conchita Carpio Morales has ordered the filing of graft charges against dismissed PNP chief Alan Purisima and 11 other police officers for their alleged involvement in the anomalous courier services contract with Werfast Documentation Agency Incorporated in 2011.
  - Mario Reyes, former mayor of Coron, Palawan and one of two brothers accused of masterminding the 2011 murder of journalist and good governance advocate Gerry Ortega is granted bail by the court trying the case.
- May 11 – The Sandiganbayan absolves former Commission on Elections chairman Benjamin Abalos' graft charges over the botched $329-million ZTE-National Broadband Network (NBN) deal in 2007.
- May 30 – The Congress proclaims Rodrigo Duterte and Leni Robredo as President-elect and Vice President-elect of the Philippines, respectively, based on the canvassing of votes by the National Board of Canvassers for President and Vice President from May 25 to 27.

==== June ====
- June 1
  - The Office of the Ombudsman orders the filing of criminal charges against former Valenzuela representative and senator-elect Sherwin Gatchalian, former Local Water Utilities Administration (LWUA) chairman of the board Prospero Pichay Jr. and 24 other former government officials and private individuals for alleged anomalous acquisition of a thrift bank by in 2009.
  - The Sandiganbayan Third Division dismisses the perjury and violation of the code of conduct cases against the late Supreme Court Chief Justice Renato Corona.
  - The Antipolo Regional Trial Court dismisses the double-murder case against ex-Colonel Red Kapunan, in connection with the deaths of former Kilusang Mayo Uno (KMU) leader, Rolando Olalia and his driver, Leonor Alay-ay on November 13, 1986.
- June 8 – The Office of the Ombudsman upholds the decision of the Manila Prosecutor's Office dismissing treason and inciting to sedition complaint filed last year against outgoing Presidential Peace Adviser Teresita Deles, peace negotiators Miriam Coronel-Ferrer and Mohagher Iqbal and members of the Bangsamoro Transition Commission (BTC).
- June 16
  - The Sandiganbayan First Division acquits former Philippine Sports Commission (PSC) chairman William Ramirez of graft in connection with the alleged anomalous procurement of cycling equipment in 2007.
  - Malacañang temporarily stops the Department of Justice (DOJ) from filing criminal charges against newly elected 1-Pacman party-list Representative Mikee Romero, who was alleged to have committed qualified theft against Harbour Centre Port Terminal Inc. (HCPTI).
- June 23 – The Department of Justice dismisses criminal complaints filed by American missionary Lane Michael White, against airport employees, including four aviation police officers, in connection with the alleged bullet planting scheme at Ninoy Aquino International Airport.
- June 28 – The Supreme Court has dismissed a petition filed by Greco Belgica and former Tarlac Governor Tingting Cojuangco that seeking the prosecution of all the authors, proponents and implementors of both the pork barrel system and the Disbursement Acceleration Program (DAP).
- June 30 – Rodrigo Duterte is inaugurated as the 16th President of the Philippines with Leni Robredo being inaugurated as the 14th Vice President of the Philippines, marking the beginning of the Rodrigo Duterte administration.

==== July ====
- July 4
  - Vice President Leni Robredo pays a closed-door courtesy call on President Duterte at Malacañang Palace, their first formal meeting, a visit that she said is meant to assure him of her support.
  - Secretary Abella said that President Duterte is pushing for a constitutional convention as a mode of changing some provisions of the Philippine Constitution.
- July 7 – President Duterte appoints Vice President Leni Robredo as the chairman of the Housing and Urban Development Coordinating Council (HUDCC), a post also previously held by her immediate predecessors Jejomar Binay and Noli de Castro.
- July 11 – The Office of the Ombudsman finds a probable cause to file graft charges against former Health Secretary Enrique Ona and two other officials of the Department of Health (DOH) for an alleged anomalous ₱392.2-million hospital modernization project in 2012.
- July 12 – The Philippines wins the arbitration case they filed at the Permanent Court of Arbitration regarding the legality of China's nine-dotted line claim over the South China Sea under the United Nations Convention on the Law of the Sea.
- July 14
  - Two former Cebu representatives Antonio Cuenco of the 2nd district and Antonio Yapha Jr. of the 3rd district were indicted by the Ombudsman for graft over the alleged misuse of their pork barrel funds in 2004.
  - President Duterte is honored by the San Beda Law Alumni Association, as the first Philippine president who graduated from San Beda College.
- July 16 – President Duterte made a public statement condemning the terror attack in Nice, France. He also expresses solidarity with France in mourning and in its fight against terrorism.
- July 18
  - The Duterte administration approves Roadmap for Peace that aims to end the long-standing conflict with Moro secessionists and communist insurgents.
  - Secretary Andanar and Department of Finance spokesperson Paola Alvarez discussed plans for the preparations for the first State of the Nation Address (SONA) of President Duterte.
- July 19
  - Ombudsman Conchita Carpio-Morales orders the filing of charges against former Metropolitan Manila Development Authority (MMDA) chairman Bayani Fernando and other MMDA officials for alleged anomalous use of funds for the Metro Manila Film Festival.
  - The Department of Justice dismisses the charges against 15 activists and Lumad leaders accused of kidnapping some 700 Lumad at the United Church of Christ in the Philippines (UCCP) Haran Evacuation Center in Davao City.
  - The Supreme Court acquits former President Gloria Macapagal Arroyo of her plunder case regarding the alleged misuse of funds for the Philippine Charity Sweepstakes Office (PCSO) in an 11–4 ruling.
- July 20
  - The Supreme Court dismisses a petition challenging the constitutionality of the Madrid Protocol or the Protocol Relating to the Madrid Agreement Concerning the International Registration of Marks.
  - Around 320 Philippine National Police-Special Action Force's (PNP-SAF) elite personnel troopers were deployed to replace jail guards of the New Bilibid Prisons (NBP), where irregularities like gun running and the illegal drug trade allegedly remain rampant.
  - The Department of the Interior and Local Government creates Task Force Digong (DILG Inter-Government Operations Network Group), following President Duterte's recent disclosure of the names of government officials allegedly involved in the illegal drug trade.
- July 22 – The Supreme Court affirms the validity of a search warrant issued by a Quezon City court against anti-human trafficking group Visayan Forum Foundation Inc. over unexplained disbursements of over P200 million in funds from the US Agency for International Development (USAID).
- July 23 – Former President Fidel Ramos accepts President Rodrigo Duterte's offer to become the country's special envoy to China.
- July 25 – President Duterte delivers his first SONA. In this SONA, President Duterte declared the truce between the government and the NPA, lamenting the heavy and tragic cost of armed rebellion.
- July 27 – The Philippines and the United States affirmed their long-standing relations at a lunch meeting between President Duterte and U.S. Secretary of State John Kerry at the President's Hall of Malacañang Palace.
- July 28 – President Duterte said he will not agree on a coalition government with the communist rebels and would prefer an inclusive set up.
- July 31 – President Duterte met with the Presidential Security Group (PSG) and their families and urged them to continue carrying out their Constitutional mandate.

==== August ====
- August 1
  - Emergency and police assistance hotline 911 and complaints against public officials hotline 8888 launched.
  - President Duterte warned large businesses to refrain from the practice of contractualization just to cut cost or they will face closure.
- August 3 – Secretary Abella said President Duterte wants the immediate revival of the Reserve Officers’ Training Corps (ROTC) program as soon as legal requirements are in place.
- August 9
  - Regarding to the burial of former president Ferdinand Marcos, according to Secretary Abella, President Duterte's position is that the whole matter should be laid to rest and the whole nation should move on. President Duterte insisted that he based his position on certain legal basis, that of those who may be qualified to be interned in Libingan ng mga Bayani includes Presidents, or Commanders-In-Chief of the Armed Forces of the Philippines (AFP), and veterans of the Philippine revolution of 1896, World War I, World War II, and recognized guerillas.
  - President Duterte, referring to oligarchs, reiterated his position that he is against online gambling, and that it is also his position to make sure that the economy is more inclusive, and that those who influence government policy and government decisions should be properly dealt with.
- August 21 – President Duterte declared all positions for presidential appointees vacant.
- August 23 – President Duterte presided over the oath taking of 75 newly promoted generals and flag officers of the AFP led by General Ricardo Visaya, the Chief of Staff, in Malacañang. He also assured that soldiers’ salary will be increased before the year 2016 ends.
- August 25 – President Duterte emphasized his duty, as commander-in-chief, to see the needs of the soldiers and policemen are provided for including a gradual increase in their salaries, proper medical facilities, and the best possible equipment necessary.
- August 28 – The Bagong Alyansang Makabayan gave President Duterte the ‘Gawad Supremo Award’ at the U.P. Film Institute, which recognizes the president's efforts to apply the aspirations of Andres Bonifacio and of the patriotic youth, and for the advancement of the patriotic and democratic interests of the people.

==== September ====
- September 22 – President Duterte ordered the military to take full control and stop paramilitary groups from operating amid ongoing peace talks with different rebel groups in the country. President Duterte particularly mentioned the Magahat-Bagani Force operating in Surigao del Sur and another group in Arakan, North Cotabato.
- September 26 – President Duterte says he'll forge stronger trade alliance with China and Russia, but clarified that he would not break ties with the United States. With regard to China, the President reiterated that he would ask Chinese leaders to at least allow Filipino fishermen to fish in Scarborough Shoal.
- September 28–29 – President Duterte's first official visit to Vietnam which aimed to strengthen the diplomatic and economic relations between the Philippines and Vietnam.
- September 29 – Death of Miriam Defensor Santiago, Filipino politician.

==== October ====
- October 16–18 – President Duterte's working visit to Brunei.
- October 18–21 – President Duterte's working visit to China.

==== November ====
- November 14 – The remains of Philippine dictator Ferdinand Marcos are buried in a private ceremony at the Libingan ng mga Bayani prompting protests throughout the Philippines.
- November 17–23 – President Duterte's working visit to Peru for the Asia Pacific Economic Cooperation Leaders' Summit.

== National legislation ==
=== January ===
- January 14 – President Aquino vetoes House Bill No. 5842, which intends to increase the pension of the members of Social Security System.
- January 19 – President Aquino approves Republic Act No. 10742 or the SK Reforms Act of 2016 that will enable reforms in strengthening the Sangguniang Kabataan (SK) political system.
- January 27 – The Bangsamoro Basic Law supposed to be passed on its final reading in the House of Representatives before January. But due to no proper quorum in the Congress, the bill had no chances to pass in the House of Representatives in the 16th Congress. Aside from the BBL, Aquino administration's priority bills, the Anti-Dynasty, Anti-Discrimination and the Freedom of Information bills, "killed" in the 16th congress as the Session will temporarily adjourned in preparation for the 2016 elections.

=== February ===
- February 19 – President Aquino signs Executive Order 201 (under the proposed Salary Standardization Law of 2015) that increases the salaries of government agency workers and adding additional benefits to civilian and military uniformed personnel.

=== March ===
- March 29 – President Aquino signs Republic Act No. 10754 into law a bill authored by Leyte Rep. Martin Romualdez granting persons with disabilities (PWDs) exemption from the 12-percent value-added tax (VAT) on certain goods and services.

=== May ===
- May 18 – President Aquino signs Republic Act No. 10821 or the Children's Emergency Relief and Protection Act which seeks to provide children with comprehensive relief and protection in the aftermath of disasters.
- May 23 – President Aquino signs Republic Act No. 10844 into law, which creates the Department of Information and Communications Technology (DICT).
- May 31 – President Aquino signs Republic Act No. 10863 or the Customs Modernization and Tariff Act which amends some previsions of the Tariff and Customs Code of 1978 and to modernize the operations of the Bureau of Customs.

=== June ===
- June 16 – President Aquino vetoes House Bill No. 6411 and Senate Bill No. 2720 that seeks to improve the nursing profession, including raising the minimum monthly salary of nurses to almost P25,000.
- June 27 – President Aquino signs Republic Act No. 10868 into law a measure that will grant a P100,000 cash incentive and additional benefits and privileges to Filipino centenarians.
- June 28 – President Aquino signs Republic Act No. 10867 into law, that mandating the National Bureau of Investigation (NBI)’s reorganization and modernization, 69 years after the creation of its first charter.

=== July ===
- July 4 – President Rodrigo Duterte signs his first executive order, entitled Reengineering the Office of the President Towards Greater Responsiveness to the Attainment of Development Goals, allowing his Cabinet Secretary Leoncio Evasco, Jr. to oversee 12 national government agencies in coming up with a set of programs to reduce both the incidence and magnitude of poverty.
- July 17
  - Republic Act No. 10870 or the Philippine Credit Card Industry Regulation Act lapsed into a law. It is an act regulating the Philippine credit card industry.
  - Republic Act No. 10871 or the Basic Life Support Training in Schools Act lapsed into a law. It is an act requiring basic education students to undergo age-appropriate basic life support training.
  - Republic Act No. 10878, an act strengthening and institutionalizing direct credit support of the Land Bank of the Philippines to agrarian reform beneficiaries, small farmers and fisherfolk, further amending the Agricultural Land Reform Code, has lapsed into a law.
  - Republic Act No. 10879 or the MIMAROPA Act lapsed into a law. It is an act establishing the southwestern Tagalog region to be known as the MIMAROPA region.
- July 20 – New Anti Carnapping Law of the Philippines (Republic Act No. 10883) that increasing the penalty for carjacking and makes it a non-bailable offense has lapsed into law.
- July 21
  - Republic Act No. 10905, an act requiring all franchise holders or operators of television stations and producers of television programs to broadcast or present their programs with closed captions option, has lapsed into a law.
  - Republic Act No. 10906 or the Anti-Mail Order Spouse Act lapsed into a law. It is an act providing stronger measures against unlawful practices, businesses, and schemes of matching and offering Filipinos to foreign nationals for purposes of marriage or common law partnership, repealing R.A. 6955, or the Anti-Mail Order Bride Law.
  - Republic Act No. 10908 or the Integrated History Act of 2016 lapsed into a law. It is an act mandating the integration of Filipino-Muslim and indigenous peoples history, culture and identity in the study of Philippine history in both basic and higher education.
  - Republic Act No. 10909 or the No Shortchanging Act of 2016 lapsed into a law. It is an act prohibiting business establishments from giving insufficient or no change to consumers.
  - Republic Act No. 10910, an act increasing the prescriptive period for violations of R.A. 3019, or the Anti-Graft and Corrupt Practices Act, has lapsed into law.
  - Republic Act No. 10911 or the Anti-Age Discrimination in Employment Act lapsed into a law. It is an act prohibiting discrimination against any individual in employment on account of age.
  - Republic Act No. 10912 or the Continuing Professional Development Act of 2016 lapsed into a law. It is an act mandating and strengthening the continuing professional development program for all regulated professions, and creating the Continuing Professional Development Council.
  - Republic Act No. 10913 or the Anti-Distracted Driving Act lapsed into a law. It is an act defining and penalizing distracted driving.
  - Republic Act No. 10915 or the Philippine Agricultural and Biosystems Engineering Act of 2016 lapsed into a law. It is an act strengthening, modernizing and aligning the practice of agricultural engineering in the Philippines into an internationally recognized practice of agricultural and biosystems engineering.
  - Republic Act No. 10916 or the Road Speed Limiter Act of 2016 lapsed into a law. It is an act requiring the mandatory installation of speed limiter in public utility and certain types of vehicles.
  - Republic Act No. 10918 or the Philippine Pharmacy Act lapsed into a law. It is an act regulating and modernizing the practice of pharmacy in the Philippines, repealing R.A. 5921 or the Pharmacy Law.
- July 22 – Republic Act No. 10922 or the Economic and Financial Literacy Act lapsed into a law. It is an act declaring the second week of November of every year as Economic and Financial Literacy Week.

=== August ===
- August 10 – The Implementing Rules and Regulations of Republic Act No. 10742, also known as the Sangguniang Kabataan Reform Act of 2015, has been approved.
- August 16 – President Duterte declares certain days the regular holidays and special non-working days for the year 2017.
- August 22 – Executive Secretary Medialdea issues Memorandum Circular No. 4, directed all presidential appointees to tender their unqualified courtesy resignations within seven calendar days except: the newly appointed Cabinet Secretaries, Undersecretaries, and Assistant Secretaries in their respective Departments, including presidential advisers or assistants; other officials in the Executive Department, including state universities and colleges, and government-owned or –controlled corporations (GOCCs), appointed by President Duterte; career officials as defined by the civil service laws, rules, and regulations; those from the Judiciary; officials whose offices are created by the Philippine Constitution (e.g. Constitutional Commissions, Ombudsman, etc.); and those whose appointments are frequently being processed or who may be appointed by the President. Presidential appointees in the Armed Forces of the Philippines and the PNP are dealt separately.
- August 25 – The Implementing Rules and Regulations of Republic Act No. 10173, also known as the Data Privacy Act of 2012, has been approved.
- August 29 – The 2016 Revised Implementing Rules and Regulations of Republic Act No. 9184, also known as the Government Procurement Reform Act, is promulgated.

=== September ===
- September 20 – Executive Secretary Medialdea issues Memorandum Circular No. 6, ordering and prohibiting all government officials, employees and personnel to enter, stay, or play in gambling casinos.
- September 26
  - Executive Secretary Medialdea issues Memorandum Circular No. 7, ordering the conduct of the Third-Quarter (2016) Nationwide Simultaneous Earthquake Drill on September 28, 2016.
  - President Duterte issues Executive Order No. 3, increasing the rates of combat duty pay and combat incentive pay of the Armed Forces of the Philippines and to the uniformed personnel of the PNP.
  - President Duterte on Monday led the signing of the Implementing Rules and Regulations of Republic Act No. 10868 or the Centenarians Act of 2016, a legislation that grants additional benefits and privileges to Filipino centenarians.
  - President Duterte led the awarding ceremony for the Child-Friendly Municipalities and Cities pursuant to Executive Order No. 184. Deserving local government units are recognized for their vital role in the sustained promotion of children's rights to survival, development, protection, and participation as well as in ensuring child-friendly governance.
- September 27 – Executive Secretary Medialdea issues Memorandum Circular No. 8, creating an inter-agency task force to expedite the organization of the Department of Information and Communications Technology.
- September 28 – Bureau of Customs Commissioner Nicanor Faeldon issues Customs Administrative Order No. 2, which sets imported goods with de minimis value not subject to duties and taxes.

=== October ===
- October 5 – President Duterte declares March 1, 2017 and every year thereafter as "ASEM Day". The Philippines is one of the founding members of the Asia Europe Meeting (ASEM) in 1996.
- October 10 – National Privacy Commission promulgates the following circulars:
  - NPC Circular No. 1 which governs the security of personal data in government agencies.
  - NPC Circular No. 2 which governs data sharing agreements involving government agencies.
  - NPC Circular No. 3 which governs personal data breach management.
- October 11
  - President Duterte issues Executive Order No. 5, which approves and adopts the 25-year long vision entitled 'AmBisyon Natin 2040' as guide for development planning.
  - President Duterte issues Administrative Order No. 1, which creates the presidential task force on violations of the right to life, liberty and security of the members of the media.
- October 14
  - President Duterte designates Secretary Medialdea as officer-in-charge during his working visits to Brunei and China from October 16 to 21.
  - President Duterte issues Executive Order No. 5, which institutionalizes the 8888 Citizens’ Complaint Hotline and establishing the 8888 Citizens’ Complaint Center.
- October 15 – President Duterte signs Republic Act No. 10923 into law, postponing the October 2016 Barangay and Sangguniang Kabataan elections.
- October 24 – Executive Secretary Medialdea issues Memorandum Circular No. 12, directing the formulation of the Philippine Development Plan and the Public Investment Program for the period of 2017 to 2022.
- October 29 – The 2016 Revised Implementing Rules and Regulations of Republic Act No. 9184, also known as the Government Procurement Reform Act, has taken effect, sixty days after its publication at the Official Gazette.

=== November ===
- November 16 – President Duterte designates Secretary Medialdea as officer-in-charge during his working visit to Peru from November 17 to 23 for the Asia Pacific Economic Cooperation Leaders' Summit.
- November 25 – The last day of compliance of Executive Order No. 2, one hundred twenty (120) calendar days after it was published in the Manila Bulletin.

=== December ===
- December 1 – President Duterte issues Executive Order No. 5, which strengthens the Office of the Cabinet Secretary.
- December 7 – President Duterte issues Executive Order No. 10, which creates a consultative committee to review the 1987 Constitution.
- December 13 – Acting Executive Secretary Menardo Guevarra declares December 26, 2016 and January 2, 2017, as Special (Non-Working) Days.
- December 15 – National Privacy Commission promulgates their rules of procedure.
