= Bank of the Philippine Islands =

Bank in the Philippines

- Ayala Triangle Gardens Tower 2, site of the BPI's headquarters
- Type: Public
- Traded as: PSE: BPI
- Industry: Finance
- Founded: Manila, Captaincy General of the Philippines, Spanish East Indies (August 1, 1851; 175 years ago)
- Founder: Margarita Roxas de Ayala and her husband Antonio de Ayala
- Headquarters: Ayala Triangle Gardens Tower 2, Paseo de Roxas corner Makati Ave, Makati Central Business District, Makati, 1226
- Key people: Jaime August M. Zobel de Ayala II (Chairman); Jose Teodoro Limcaoco (President & CEO)
- Services: Banking
- Revenue: ₱101.92 billion (2020)
- Net income: ₱21.41 billion (2020)
- Total assets: ₱2.23 trillion (2020)
- Owner: Ayala Corporation (~22.2% equity)
- Number of employees: 21,429 (2019)
- Subsidiaries: BPI Capital Corp.; BPI Asset Management and Trust Corp.
- Capital ratio: Tier 1 14.08% (2019)
- Rating: Standard & Poor's: BBB+ Moody's: baa2 Fitch Ratings: BB+ Capital Intelligence: BBB
- Website: bpi.com.ph

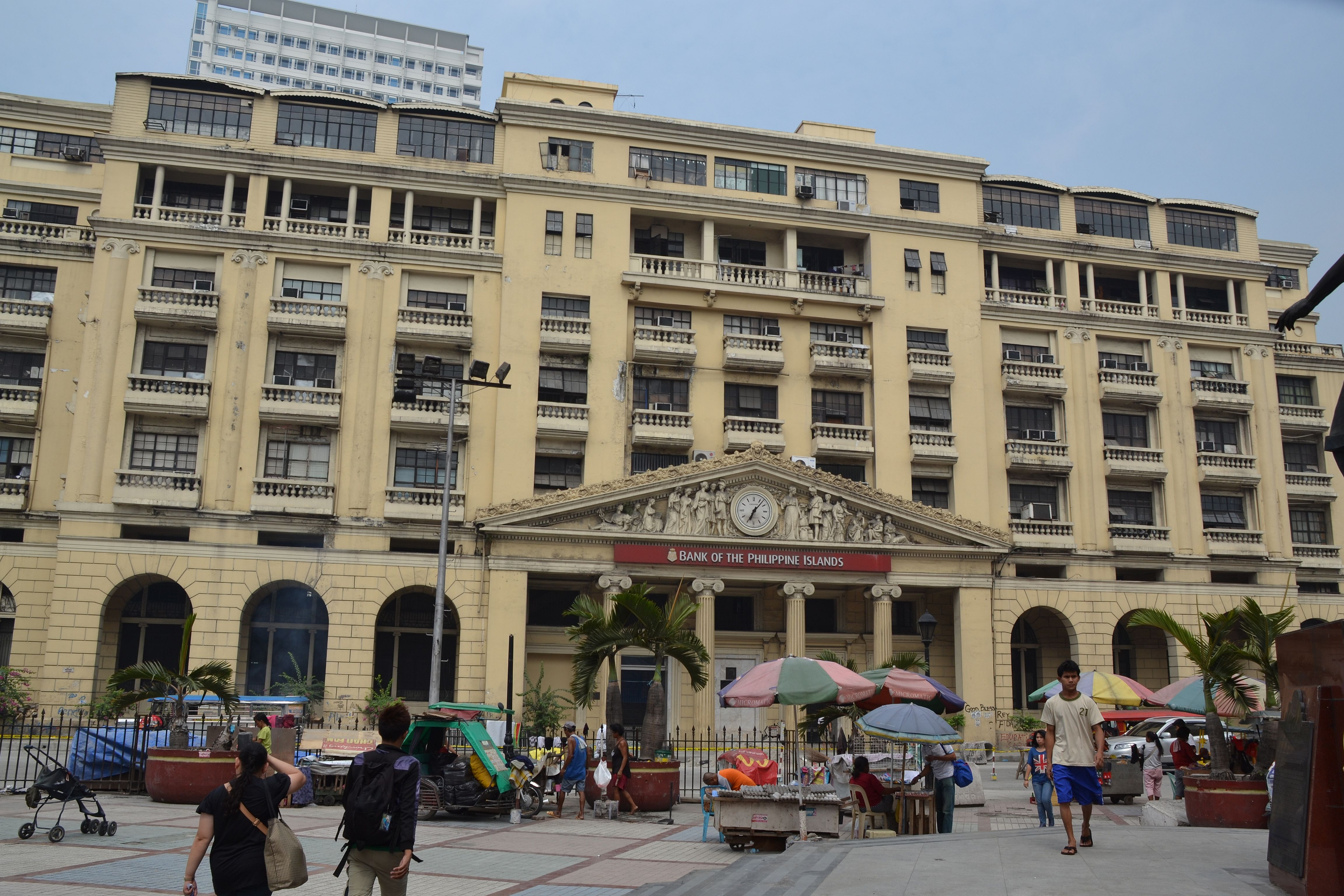
BPI Escolta Sta. Cruz branch at Plaza Santa Cruz, Manila which occupied the Don Roman Santos Building, former head office of Prudential Bank

The Bank of the Philippine Islands (Note: Filipino: Bangko ng Kapuluang Pilipinas; Spanish: Banco de las Islas Filipinas) (BPI) is a Philippine universal bank headquartered in Makati. It is the oldest bank in the Philippines and in Southeast Asia. It is the fourth largest bank in terms of assets, the second largest bank in terms of market capitalization, and one of the most profitable banks in the Philippines. The bank has a network of over 900 branches in the Philippines, Hong Kong and Europe, and more than 3,000 ATMs and CDMs (cash deposit machines).

BPI was founded during the Spanish colonial era of the Philippines as El Banco Español Filipino de Isabel II. It provided credit to the National Treasury and printed and issued the Philippine peso fuerte, a precursor to today's Philippine peso.

== History ==
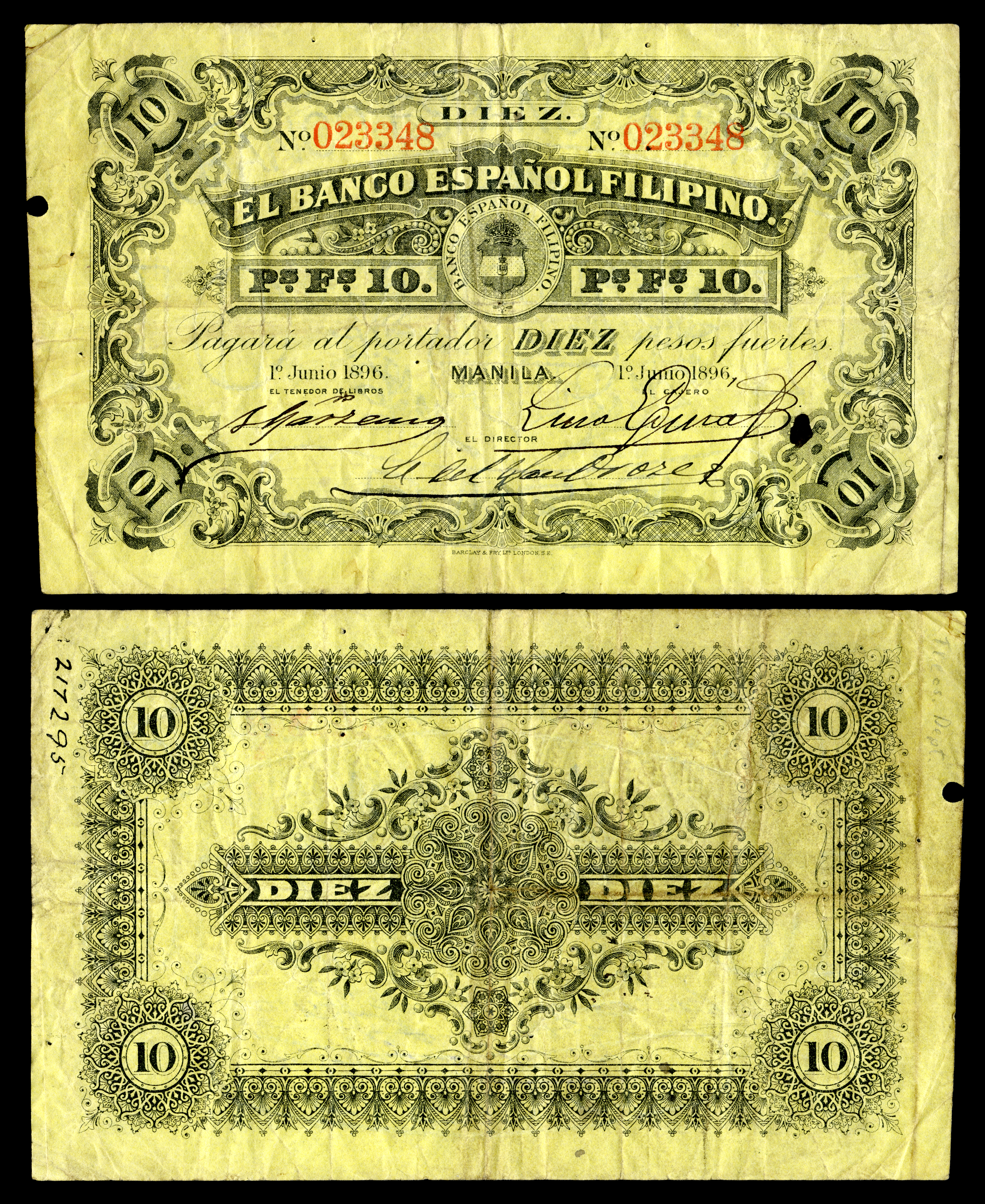
El Banco Español-Filipino, 10 pesos bank note (1896)

=== Colonial period ===
BPI was established on August 1, 1851, by Margarita Roxas de Ayala and her husband Antonio de Ayala, as the "El Banco Español Filipino de Isabel II" (lit. 'The Spanish-Filipino Bank of Isabel II'), named after the Queen of Spain, Isabella II, the daughter of King Ferdinand VII. It was the first government bank in the Philippines and the third Philippine bank during the Spanish era. The first managing directors of Banco Español-Filipino were Jose Maria Tuason and Fernando Aguirre. They took turns serving as managing director every year. One of the founders and primary shareholders at that time was José Joaquín de Ynchausti of Ynchausti y Cía, a prominent Philippine multi-national conglomerate who also founded Tanduay Distillery and built the Puente Colgante. José was the managing director of the bank from 1868 to 1873 and 1876 to 1884.

The royal decree establishing the Banco Español-Filipino also gave it the power to print Philippine currency, the first time the Philippine peso was printed in the country; before 1851, a multitude of currencies were used, most notably the Mexican peso. They were originally called Philippine peso fuerte (PF), or "strong pesos". First printed on May 1, 1852, they were redeemable at face value for gold or silver Mexican coins just to circulate the first Philippine currency. The first deposit with the bank was also done on that day by a man named Fulgencio Barrera with silver and gold. Three days later, a Chinese man named Tadian became the first borrowing client of the bank after the bank discounted to him an initial and foremost promissory note amounting to ten thousand pesos fuertes.

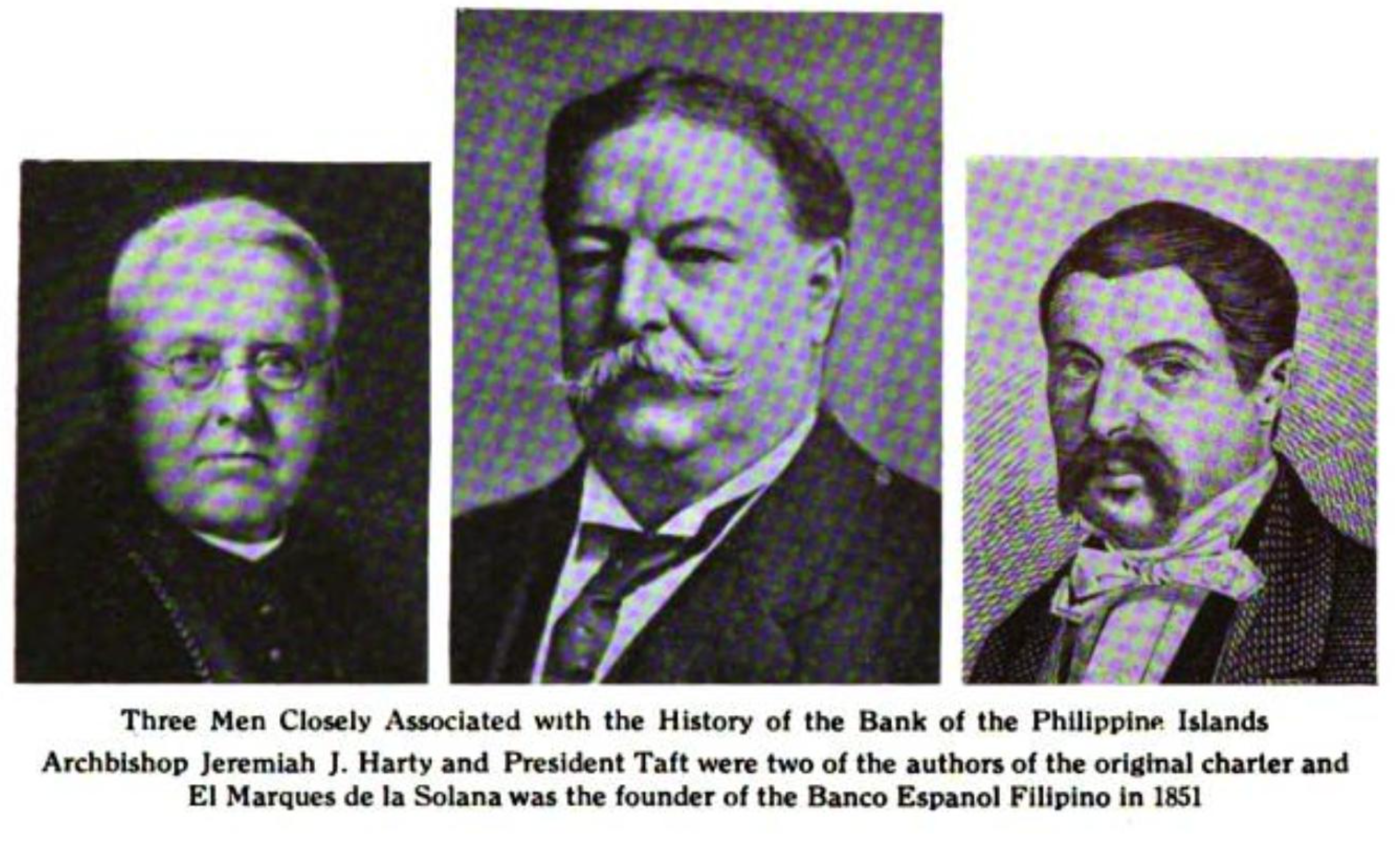
Archbishop Jeremiah J. Harty, President Taft (Authors of the original charter), El Marques de la Solana was the founder of the Banco Espanol Filipino in 1851

On September 3, 1869, following a revolution which overthrew Isabella II, the name was changed to Banco Español-Filipino. In January 1892, the bank moved from the Royal Custom House in Intramuros to the new business district of Binondo after it found out that Intramuros was becoming "economically inactive". It moved to 4 Plaza Cervantes corner Juan Luna Street which was at that time a prime property owned by the Dominican friars.

The first branch of Banco Español-Filipino outside Manila was opened in Iloilo City on March 15, 1897. However, the idea to set up branches outside Manila was formulated as far back as the 1850s, with the first branch planned to be opened in Bacolor, the capital of Pampanga at the time. However, by then, Iloilo and other provinces in Panay had become more productive than Pampanga in the sugar industry, hence the move to open the first branch in Iloilo.

Following the cession of the Philippines to the United States with the signing of the 1898 Treaty of Paris, the bank changed from a Spanish institution to a Philippine one. On January 1, 1912, a decision by the shareholders of Banco Español-Filipino changed the name to the present Bank of the Philippine Islands (BPI) or Banco de las Islas Filipinas in Spanish. The basis for the name change was Act No. 1790, passed on October 12, 1907, which permitted the bank to change its name. The bank was also fully privatised during the American colonial period.

Following World War II, BPI was actively involved in the post-war reconstruction of the Philippines. In 1949, with the establishment of the Central Bank of the Philippines (now the Bangko Sentral ng Pilipinas), BPI completely lost the right to issue Philippine pesos, a right it had since the Spanish colonial era and during the American colonial period – up until 1934.

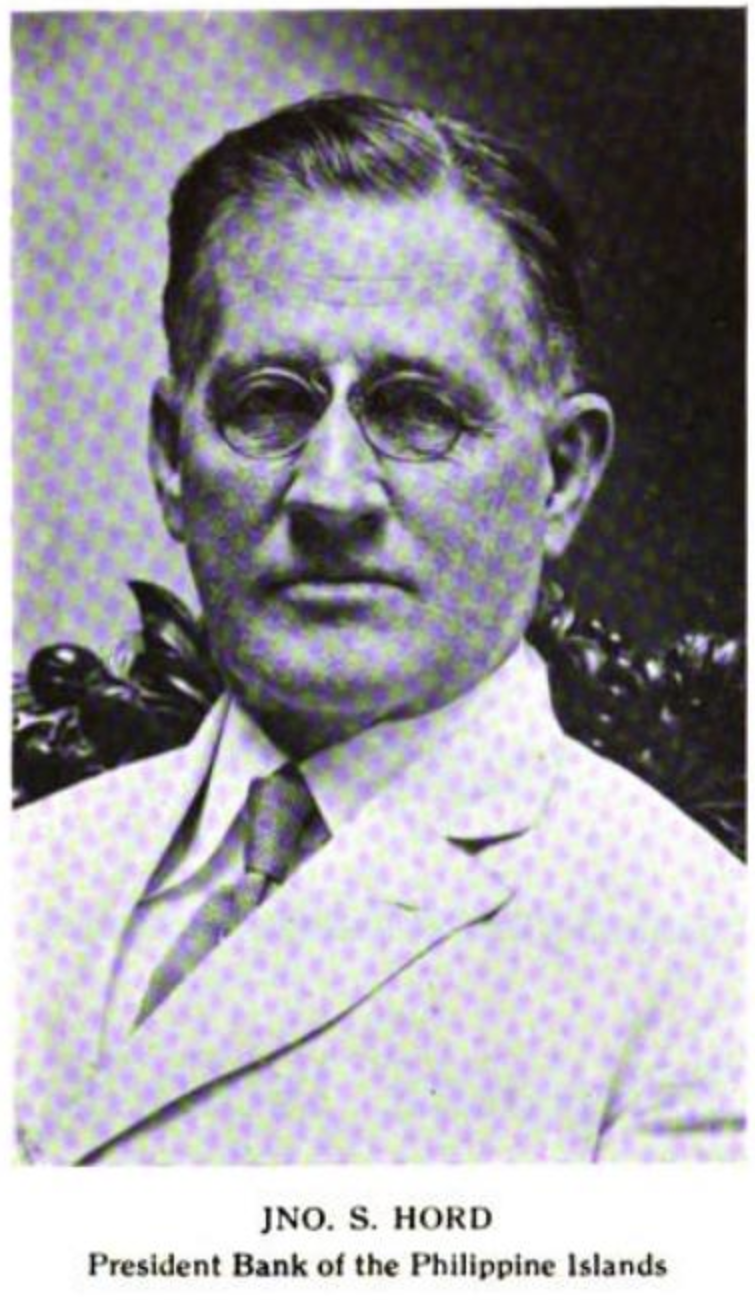
Jno S. Hord 1917, Bank of the Philippine Islands, THE BANKERS MAGAZINE VOLUME XCVI JANUARY TO JUNE

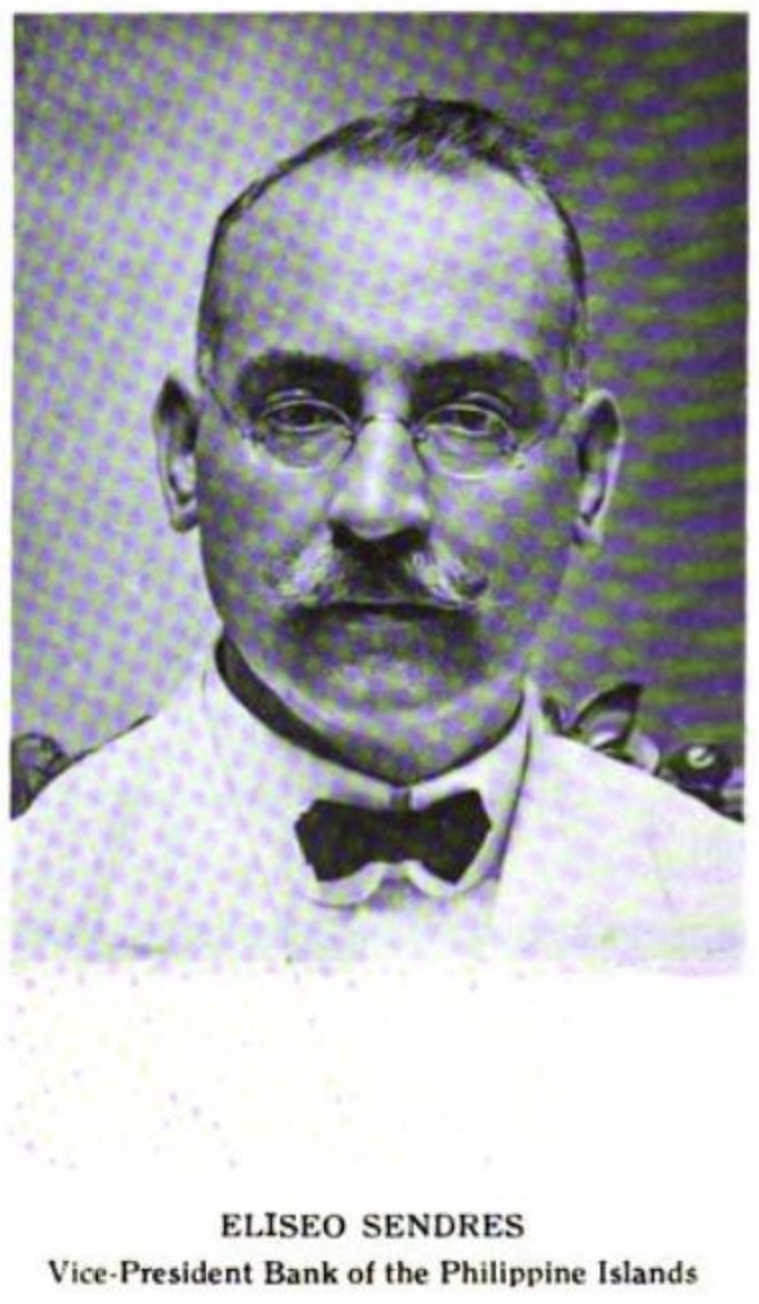
Eliseo Sendres 1917, Bank of the Philippine Islands, THE BANKERS MAGAZINE VOLUME XCVI JANUARY TO JUNE

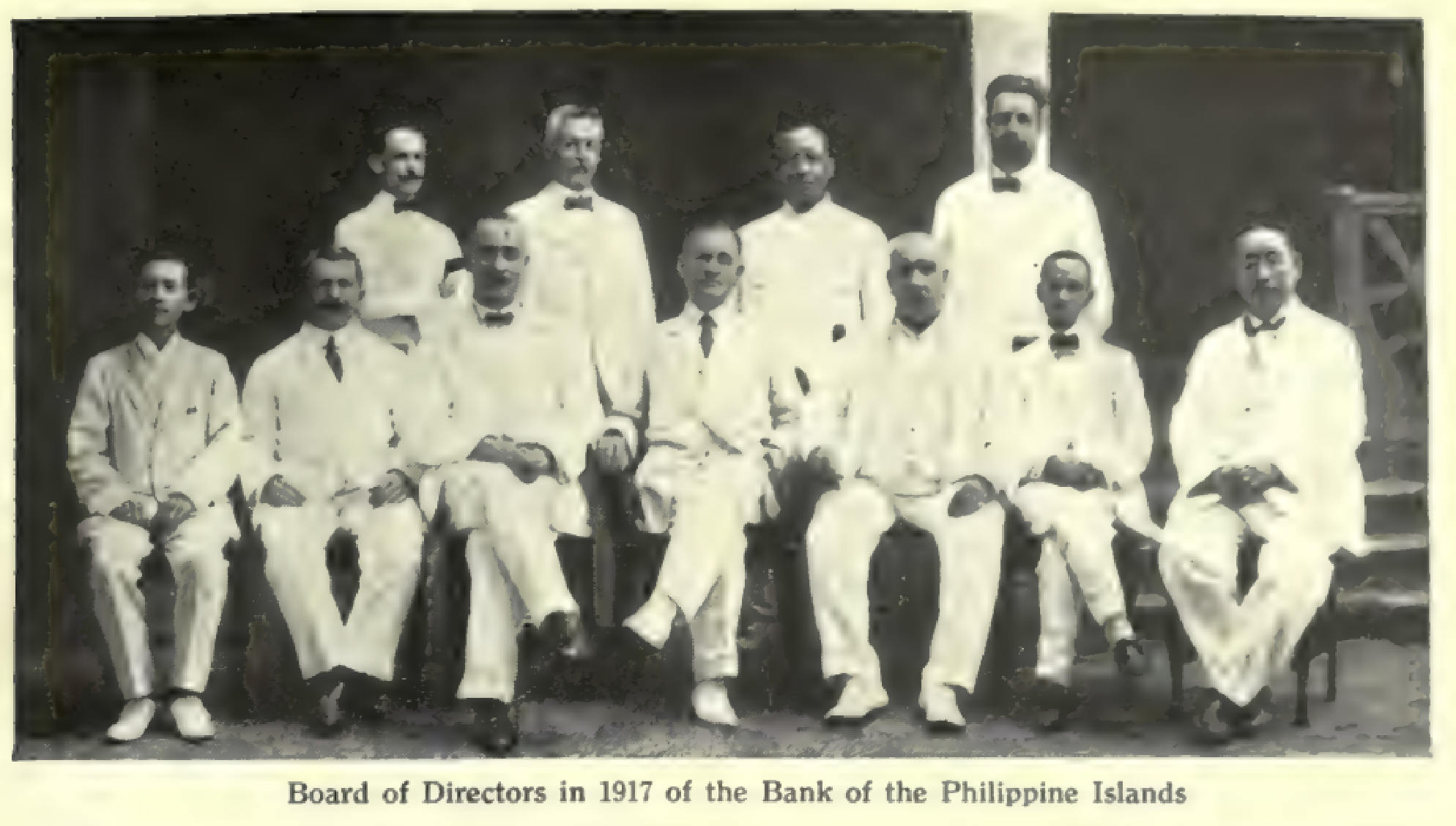
Board of Directors in 1917 of the Bank of the Philippine Islands, Bankers' Magazine and State Financial Register Volume 96 1918

(At the general annual meeting of stockholders held on Feb. 13, 1917, the following ticket was unanimously elected: President, Jno S. Hord; vice-president, E. Sendres; directors, E. Barrera, Edilberto Calixto, Alfredo Chicote, Luis Llanso, P.A. Meyer, Maximino Paterno, Felix Roxas, Jas. J. Rafferty, Benito Siy Cong Bieng, P.C. Whitaker)

=== Contemporary history ===
On December 31, 1969, Ayala Corporation, which had been affiliated with BPI since its establishment in 1851, became the dominant shareholder of BPI, and eventually made BPI into the flagship of Ayala's financial entities. The New York Times, in an article around 15 years later, described the event as hostile takeover type of snatching of control from the Archbishop of Manila against the backdrop of a pious predominantly catholic nation.

Starting in the 1970s, BPI has been involved with many mergers and acquisitions. The first merger occurred in 1974 with BPI's acquisition of the People's Bank and Trust Company. Major notable acquisitions include Commercial Bank and Trust Company in 1981, CityTrust Banking Corporation in 1996, Far East Bank and Trust Company in 2000, Prudential Bank in 2005, BPI's subsidiary BPI Family Savings Bank in early-2022 and Robinsons Bank in early-2024.

In 1982, BPI became a universal bank and inaugurated its new headquarters building at the intersection of Ayala Avenue and Paseo de Roxas in the Ayala-developed Makati Central Business District. In 2000, it became the Philippines' first bank assurance firm, being the first Philippine bank to offer insurance services after acquiring the insurance companies of the Ayala Corporation, the parent company of BPI. Within that year, BPI also founded the BPI Direct Savings Bank, an Internet bank.

On February 14, 1986, BPI established its own interbank network, Expressnet.

In October 2015, BPI launched their "Make the Best Things Happen" campaign.

In the second quarter of 2019, BPI began constructing its new headquarters in Makati, replacing the old headquarters building on its place. BPI has tapped Skidmore, Owings & Merrill for its design. It relocated its head offices from the old building to nearby locations, including the Insular Life Building, Ayala North Exchange, Makati Stock Exchange building, and BPI Buendia Center in Makati, while other offices moved to Vertis North in Quezon City and in Alabang, Muntinlupa. Its head offices were subsequently relocated to the adjacent Insular Life Building, Ayala North Exchange, Makati Stock Exchange building, and BPI Buendia Center in Makati, while other offices moved to Vertis North in Quezon City and to Alabang, Muntinlupa.

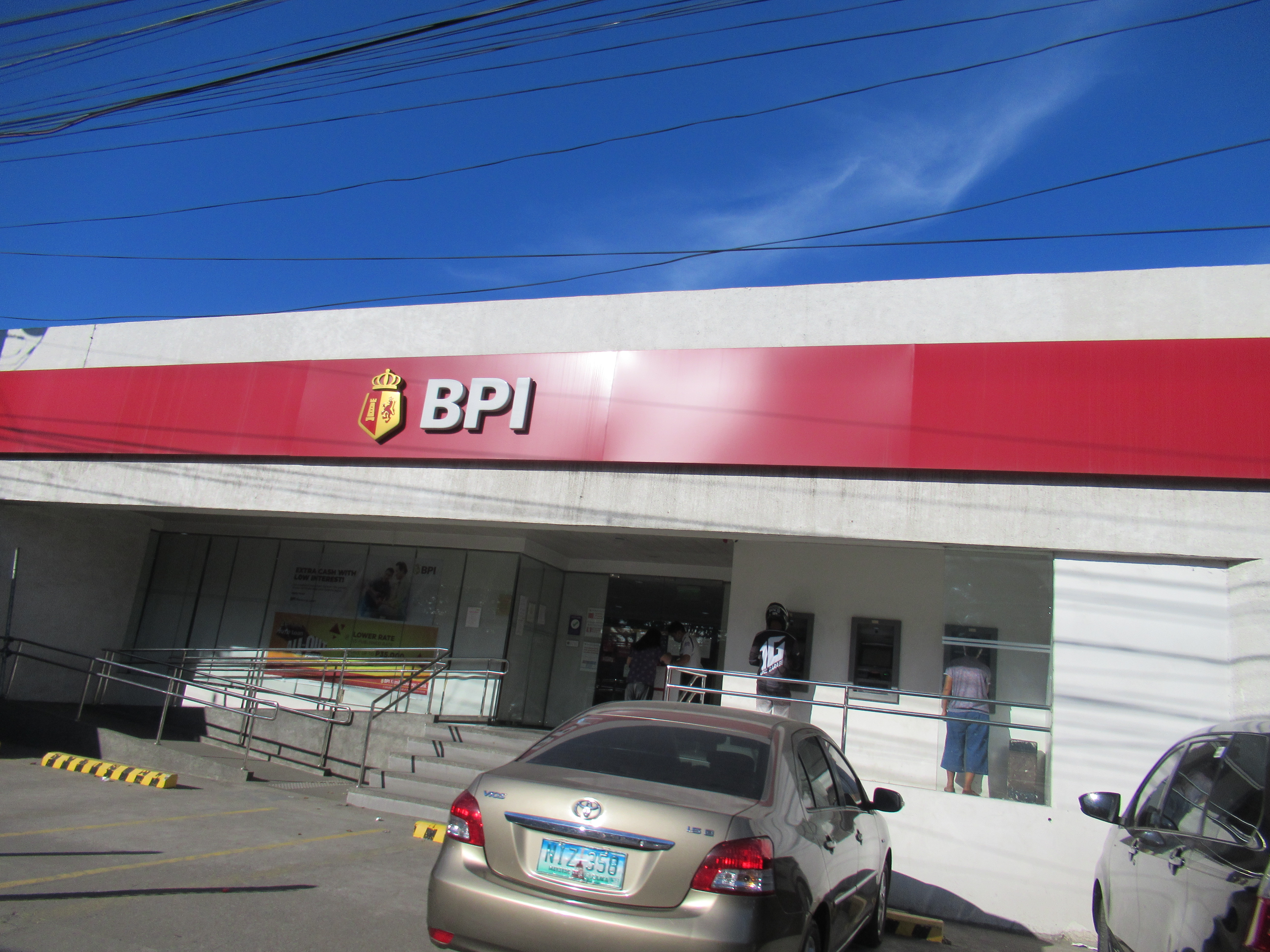
A BPI branch in Malolos, Bulacan

BPI launched its new logo in August 2019 and its Do More tagline in August 2023. In June 2023, BPI completed the transfer of its various head office units to Ayala Triangle Gardens Tower 2, reducing its headquarters to two locations: the tower and the BPI Buendia Center.

==== 2017 system glitch ====
On the morning of June 7, 2017, a data processing glitch affected BPI clients making their account balances incorrect. Some clients had either a negative balance or an increased amount of money in their account. The error was fixed in the evening, but the next day, June 8, BPI suspended electronic services because incorrect balances occurred again. The services were restored once more on the evening of the same day upon fixing the defect.

== BanKo ==
BanKo
- Type: Subsidiary
- Industry: Finance and insurance
- Predecessor: BPI Direct Savings Bank; BPI Globe Banko
- Founded: Manila, Philippines (1986)
- Successor: BPI BanKo
- Headquarters: Makati, Philippines
- Key people: Rodolfo K. Mabiasen, Jr., President
- Products: Financial services, savings, microfinance and SME (small and medium entreprise) loans
- Net income: ₱40.9 million (▲19%) (2009)
- Parent: Bank of the Philippine Islands
- Website: www.banko.com.ph

BPI Direct BanKo, Inc., A Savings Bank (operating as BanKo) is a wholly owned subsidiary of BPI established through the merging of BPI Direct Savings Bank (the first internet-based bank in the country, allowing expatriate Filipinos and overseas workers in countries like Bahrain or Hong Kong to access and manage their bank accounts at any time) and the BPI Globe Banko.

BPI Globe BanKo's predecessor BPI Direct Savings Bank, was incorporated and registered with the Securities and Exchange Commission on September 26, 1986, primarily as a subsidiary meant to engage in the general business of savings and mortgage banking.

In 2000, BPI Direct underwent a major image change as it became the first Philippine bank designed around the telephone and online banking channels. Two years later, BPI Direct realigned its business strategy towards the Overseas Filipino community.

As the result of BPI Direct and with BPI Globe BanKo (another thrift bank unit of BPI) merging in December 2016 forming BPI Direct BanKO Inc. (BPI BanKo).

BPI's consolidation of its two subsidiaries forming BPI Direct BanKo, is its answer to the growing microfinance to small and medium enterprise finance industry sector in the Philippines, competing directly with SME/Microfinance institutions in the country - ASA Philippines, Card Bank (CardBank and Card SME Bank), and LifeBank MFI.

== Subsidiaries and partners ==
BPI is divided into the following subsidiaries and affiliates:

- BPI Asset Management and Trust Corporation
- BPI Capital Corp.
- BPI Computer Systems Corp.
- BPI Family Savings Bank (Savings bank of BPI)
- BPI BanKo (merged BPI Direct Savings Bank and BPI Globe BanKO Savings Bank) (Small and medium enterprise and microfinance oriented rural-savings bank of BPI)
- BPI Forex Corp.
- BPI Foundation, Inc.
- BPI International Finance Ltd.
- BPI Investment Management. Inc.
- BPI Leasing Corp.
- BPI Operations Mgt. Corp.
- BPI Rental Corp.
- BPI Securities Corp.
- BPI/MS Insurance Corp.
- Legazpi Savings Bank

On September 30, 2022, BPI and Robinsons Bank disclosed their merger expected to complete by December 31, 2023, with BPI as the surviving entity.

== Ownership ==
- PCD Nominee Corporation: 34.8533%
- Ayala Corporation: 28.7396%
- Liontide Holdings^{1}: 15.6146%
- Robinsons Retail Holdings, Inc.: 5.4557%
- JG Summit Capital Services Corp.: 3.5735%
- Archdiocese of Manila^{2}: 6.7771%
- Michigan Holdings: 1.9156%

While the Philippine Central Depository is listed a major shareholder, it is more of a trustee-nominee for all shares lodged in the PCD system rather than a single owner/shareholder.

^{1} Includes DBS Bank.
^{2} Voting powers vested ex officio in the Archbishop of Manila.

== Gallery ==
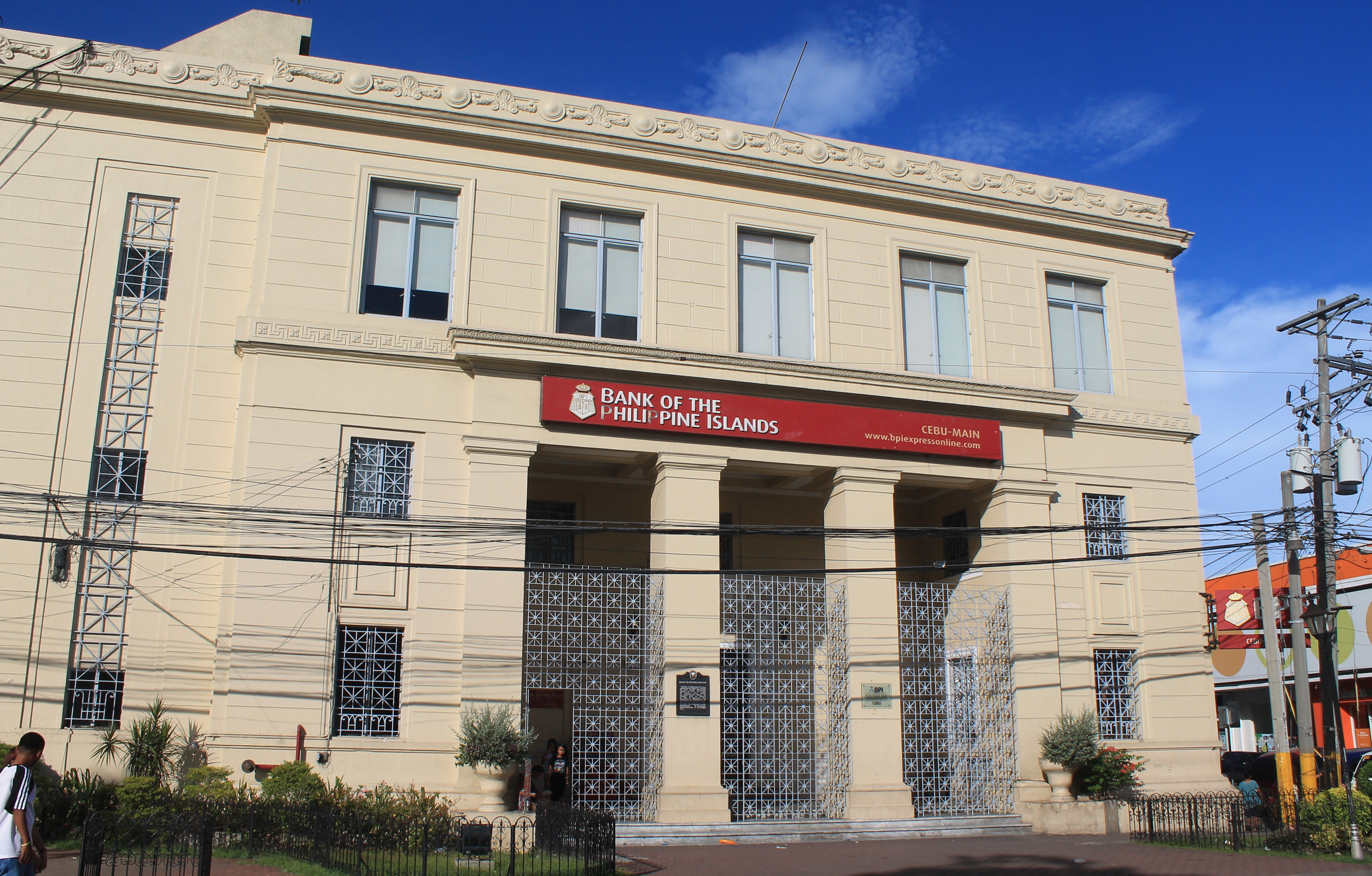
BPI Museum Cebu in 2014

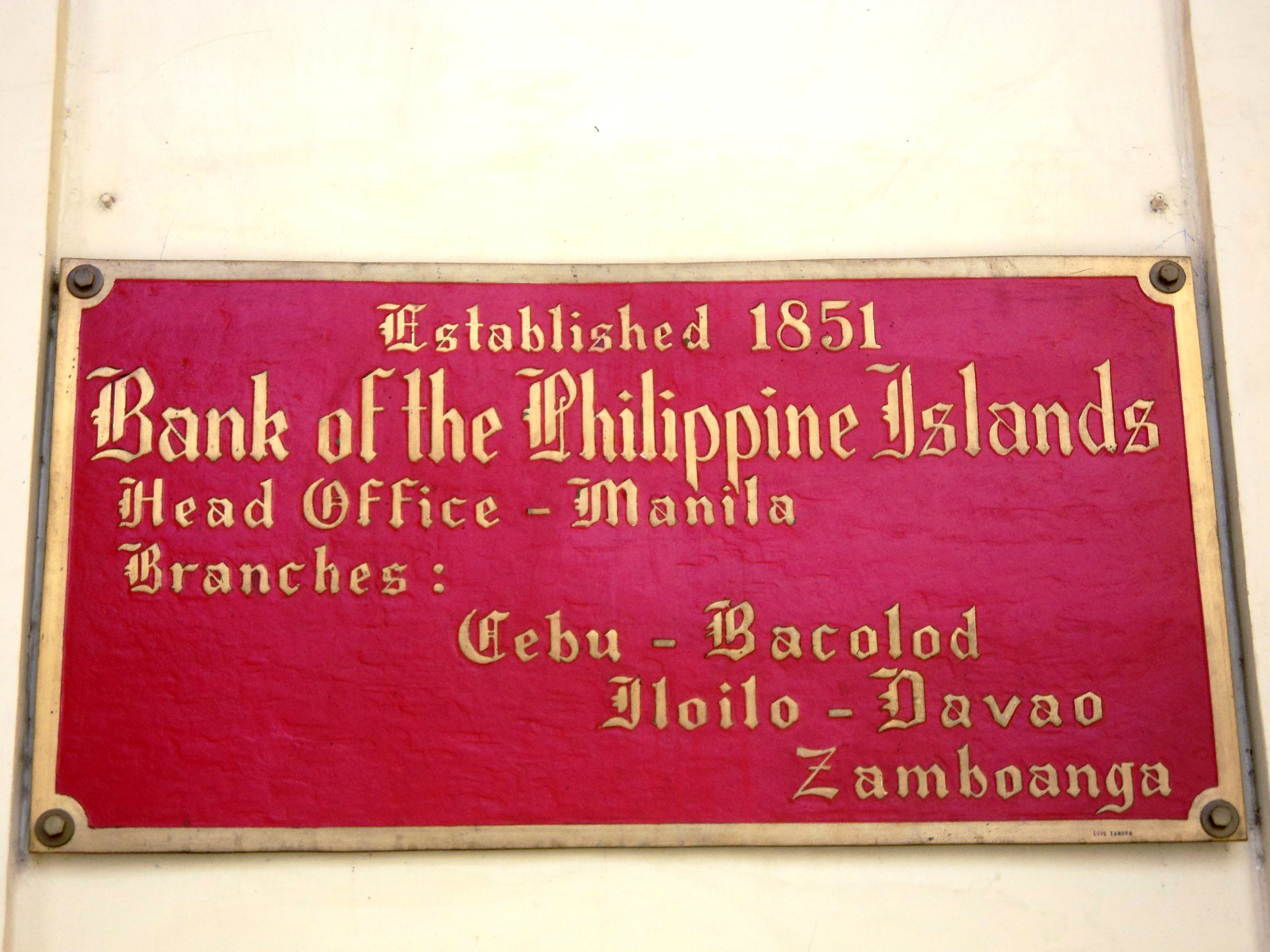
BPI Marker

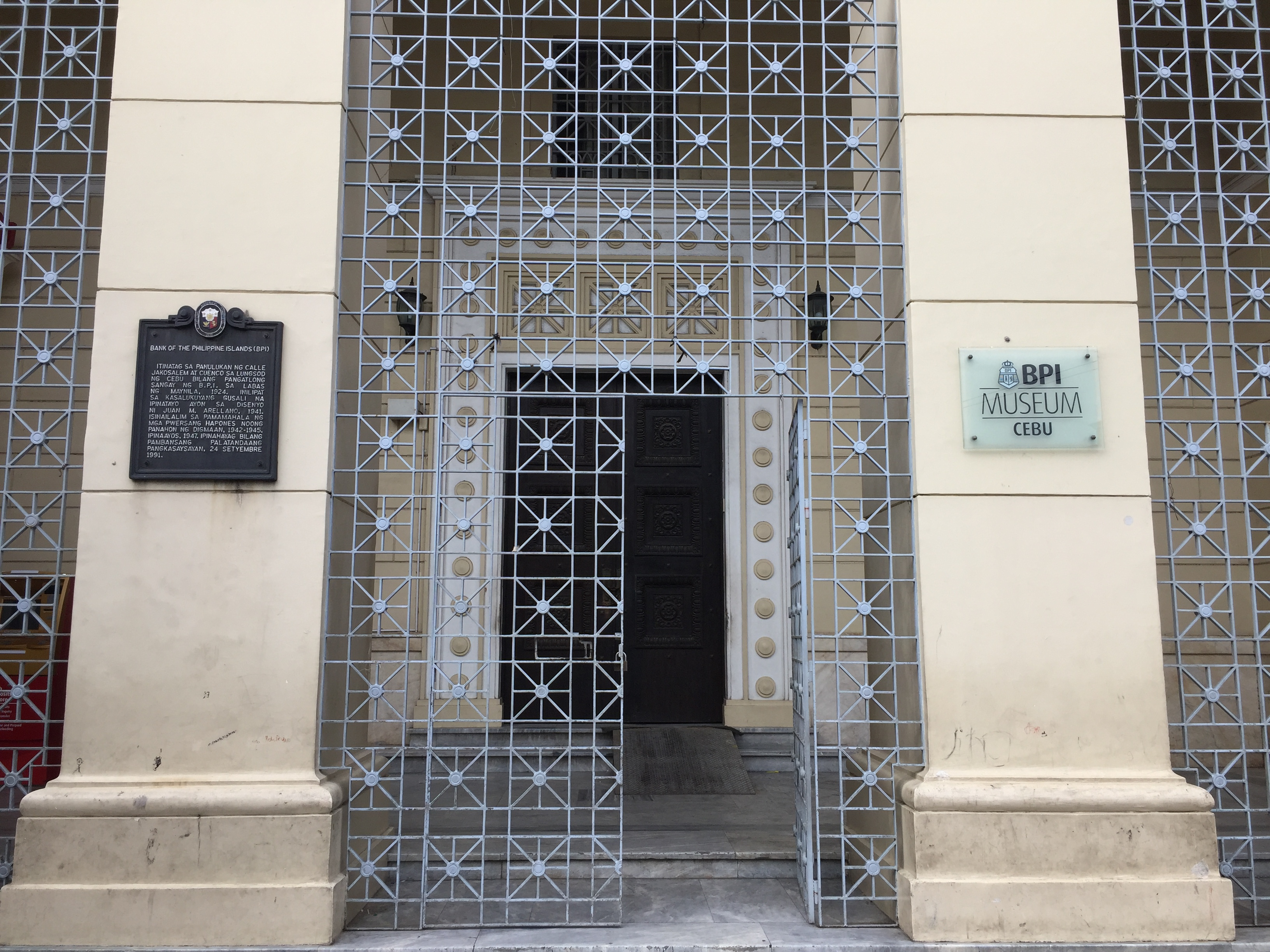
BPI Museum Cebu Entrance

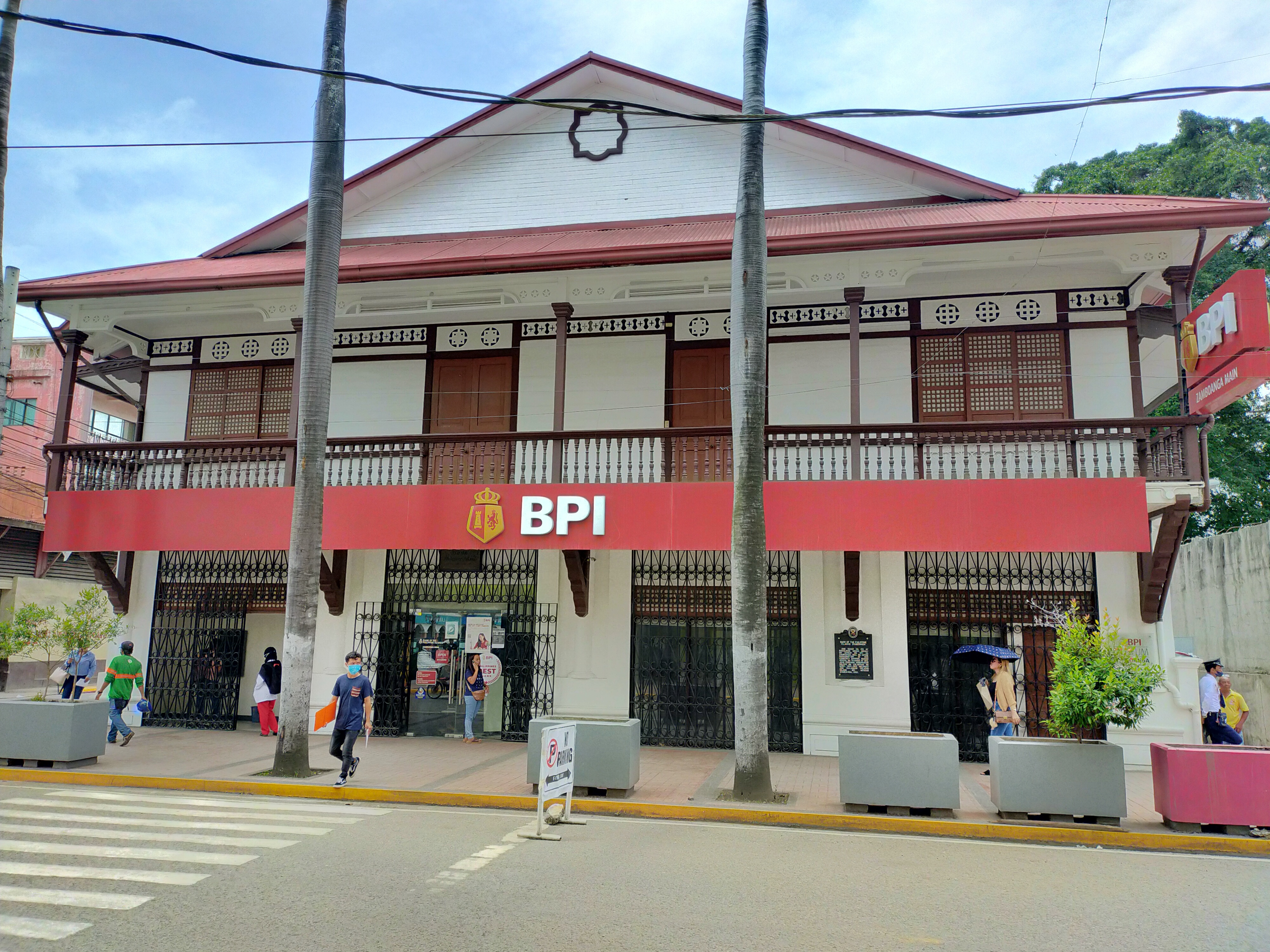
BPI Zamboanga Main branch in Zamboanga City

== See also ==
- Ayala Corporation
- BancNet (the BPI ATM network)
- List of Philippine companies
- List of banks in the Philippines
