= LifeBank =

LifeBank may refer to:

- LifeBank (Philippines), a microfinance institution and bank based in Iloilo City and Santa Barbara, Iloilo, Philippines
- LifeBank (Nigeria), a healthcare technology and logistics company based in Lagos, Nigeria
