= Nicanor Perlas =

Filipino activist (1950–2025)

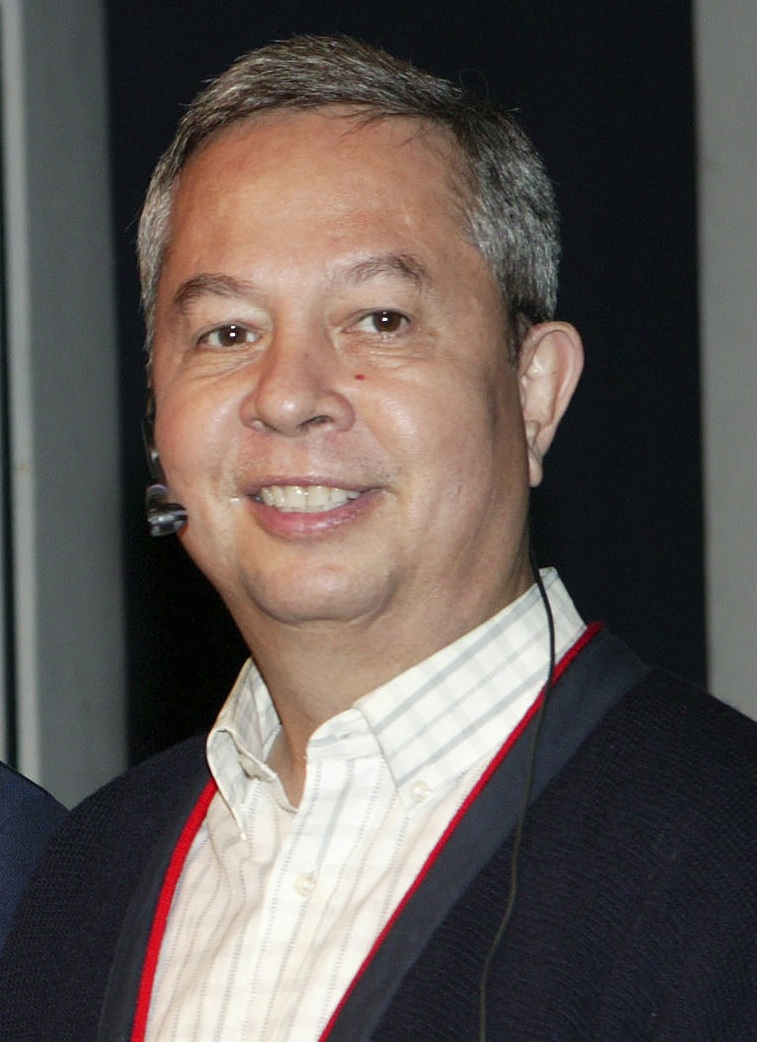

Personal details
- Born: January 10, 1950 Manila, Philippines
- Died: August 14, 2025 (aged 75)
- Party: Independent
- Awards: Right Livelihood Award
- Education: Xavier University - Ateneo de Cagayan (BS); University of the Philippines Los Baños
- Occupations: Activist, professor
- Known for: Key organizer of a university-wide education reform movement that resulted in changes in university policies

Nicanor Jesús Pineda Perlas III (January 10, 1950 – August 14, 2025) was a Filipino activist and awardee of the Right Livelihood Award in 2003, which is often referred as an alternative Nobel Prize.

Perlas served as the Chairman of the board of directors and trustees of LifeBank, a rural bank and microfinancial institution in the Philippines.

== Early life and education ==
Perlas was born on January 10, 1950, the son of Jesus C. Perlas, Sr. and Anunciacion M. Pineda. Raised into a Spanish Filipino family of Azucarera (sugar mill) owners, he finished his elementary education at the Ateneo de Manila University in 1964 and finished his secondary education in the same school in 1968. While spending his high school years at the Ateneo, he was the Athlete of the Year and the recipient of the Silver Medal of the school's Math and Science Club in 1968.

Perlas pursued his undergraduate studies at the College of Agriculture in Xavier University - Ateneo de Cagayan. With the highest honors, he graduated Bachelor of Science in Agriculture, major in Agronomy and minor in Agricultural Economics in the said educational institution in 1972. He would then seek to pursue his master's studies at the University of the Philippines Los Baños, but would soon be forced to abandon his studies after being involved in the opposition of the Bataan nuclear power plant under the presidency of Ferdinand Marcos.

== LifeBank ==
Perlas served as Chairman of the Board of Trustees of LifeBank, a rural bank and microfinance institution in the Philippines founded in 1970. LifeBank operates two corporate arms: LifeBank Rural Bank (LifeBank RB), supervised by the Bangko Sentral ng Pilipinas, and LifeBank Microfinance Foundation, Inc. (LifeBank MFI), a non-governmental microfinance organization established in 2003.

== Activism ==
In his university days, Perlas was one of the key organizers of a university-wide education reform movement that resulted in changes in university policies. During this time, he founded the first ecological society in the Philippines. After graduation, he co-organized a successful large scale global campaign, the first of its kind during his time, to halt 12 nuclear plants in the Philippines. Perlas subsequently become a technical adviser to the Presidential Commission on the Philippine Nuclear Power Plant, Office of the President of the Philippines, where he was instrumental in stopping the operation of the fully constructed and operational Bataan Nuclear Power Plant, a $2.2 billion project plagued with design, construction, location, and corruption problems.

Shortly thereafter, Perlas was appointed member of the national technical panel overseeing the regulation of pesticide use in Philippine agriculture. While in this capacity, he simultaneously mobilized and headed a national effort that resulted in the banning of 32 hazardous pesticide formulations in the Philippines. The ban triggered the creation of a P750 million government program to reduce the use of pesticides in Philippine agriculture.

In parallel with these efforts, Perlas pioneered the introduction of large scale commercial organic and biodynamic agriculture in many provinces in the Philippines. All these efforts were the fruition of early advocacies in sustainable agriculture when he was still an agricultural journalist and columnist at the Modern Agriculture and Industry-Asia, where he pioneered the first monthly articles on ecological agriculture in the Asian context. Together with colleagues at the International Alliance for Sustainable Agriculture or IASA, he coined the term sustainable agriculture in 1983, a term which has received wide use and currency until today.

Perlas was the chief negotiator for a network of national networks, which involved 5000 organizations, that successfully stopped the agenda of radical and one sided liberalization in the Asia Pacific Economic Cooperation or APEC. He successfully introduced strong sustainable development language in the Leaders and Ministerial Declarations in APEC, and constrained the Individual Action Plan of the Philippines to abide by sustainable development principles. The successful negotiations prevented the premature exposure and economic decline of 3 million Philippine rice farmers to subsidized and artificially cheap rice coming from other countries.

=== Projects and offices ===
Perlas was the co-founder, president and executive director of the Center for Alternative Development Initiatives or CADI, in Metro Manila and Iloilo City, where he guided research and policy work and developed initiatives on globalization, threefolding and their impacts on civil society, cultural power and sustainable development.

He was also the co-founder and spokesperson of Karangalan which hosted a series of national conferences highlighting important global and national innovations and achievements by Filipinos in many disciplines and fields. Karangalan aims to stimulate the creation of a visionary Philippines. The 1st National Conference and Festival on “Mobilizing Excellence for Creating a Visionary Philippines” was January 21–23, 2005 at the Cultural Center of the Philippines, in partnership with over 40 organizations and networks.

Perlas was the chief facilitator and co-founder of the ABS-CBN "Forum on the Filipino Future", held on December 16, 2004. He was Chairman, Adviser on Strategy and Integral Sustainable Development, and Member, Board of Directors, LifeBank ARB, and Board of Trustees of LifeBank MFI, both of which help close to more than 400,000 (both LifeBank ARB and LifeBank MFI) economically poor families through microfinance and other lending products offerings.

He was chairman of several national civil society networks including the Green Forum Philippines, the Philippine Sustainable Agriculture Coalition, and the Civil Society Counterpart Council for Sustainable Development.

=== Philippine Agenda 21 ===
In the mid-1990s he was one of two technical writers of Philippine Agenda 21 or PA21, which is a creative response to the challenges of elite globalization. He was one of the official civil society delegates from the Philippines at the Earth Summit in Rio. It was out of this experience, among others, that he helped shape the process and substance of PA21. Having emerged from more than 26 regional and national consultations, PA21 was characterized by the former Philippine president as the most consultative policy document in post-martial law Philippines. PA21 is still officially the blueprint for sustainable development in the Philippines, although presently marginalized by the current controversial government of the Philippines.

He was also the technical writer of SIAD: Framework for the Localization of Philippine Agenda 21, which is now used by a number of local governments and civil society organizations to advance sustainable integrated area development in towns.

As co-chair for the Civil Society of the Philippine Council for Sustainable Development under the Office of the President of the Philippines, Perlas attended several United Nations meetings, including the UN General Assembly on Sustainable Development (UNGASS) and the 6th Session of the UN Commission on Sustainable Development, serving as Technical Adviser to the Philippine Delegation. Beyond his work on PA21, Perlas served as a resource person and keynote speaker at international and national conferences across more than 20 countries, covering topics such as globalization, sustainable development, social threefolding, corporate social responsibility, and cultural transformation. He provided consultancy to several UN agencies, the Philippine Senate, donor agencies, and civil society organizations working on ecological and social responsibility. Perlas was a member of Mikhail Gorbachev's Commission on Globalization. He was also a Creative Member of the Club of Budapest.

=== Lemniscate Process ===
Perlas conducted training sessions in the Philippines and abroad on topics related to sustainable development and societal transformation. He developed a framework he called the Lemniscate Process, which draws on more than two dozen disciplines and is aimed at integrating inner change with peaceful societal transformation to advance sustainable development. Perlas was part of the faculty at the graduate program of the Southeast Asian Interdisciplinary Development Institute (SAIDI). He was also a professor at the accredited doctoral program on Applied Cosmic Anthropology of the Asian Social Institute, and a board member and resource person for training programs of the Gamot Cogon Institute (GCI), based in Iloilo, Philippines.

=== Writings ===
Perlas wrote over 500 articles, editorials, monographs and books on a range of topics including globalization, social threefolding, conscious evolution, civil society, multiple intelligence, creativity, cultural power, philosophy of science and biology, technological singularity, sustainable agriculture, appreciative inquiry, neurophysiology and consciousness, anthroposophy, good governance, new politics, associative economics, and the integration of inner change and large-scale societal transformation.

He was the publisher and editor-in-chief for TruthForce!, a national and global internet-based news and analysis service which reaches thousands of subscribers and readers in over 60 countries.

Formerly, he was Editor-In-Chief, Ikabuhi Newspaper for Micro-Entrepreneurs (34,000 + circulation).

His book, Shaping Globalization: Civil Society, Cultural Power, and Threefolding, has been translated in 9 languages. It is being used in dozens of universities in the Philippines and various parts of the world.

=== Presidential candidate in 2010 ===
On June 17, 2009, Perlas announced his candidacy for the presidential election in 2010. He lost to the Liberal Party's candidate Noynoy Aquino.

A month before the Philippines would begin the first automated general elections, Perlas unsuccessfully petitioned the Commission on Elections to postpone the polls for 90 days, accusing the commission of COMELEC failing to adequately prepare for the vote.

== Personal life and death ==
Perlas was married to American citizen Kathryn Carpenter but later divorced. Together they had one son, Christopher Michael Perlas.

Perlas died on August 14, 2025, at the age of 75.

== Awards ==
His awards include the William F. Masterson Award, the top award for outstanding alumni of Xavier University, given for his contributions to sustainable agriculture. In 2003, he was awarded the Right Livelihood Award for his work as an environmental activist.
