= New BPI Headquarters =

Skyscraper in Makati, Philippines

General information
- Status: Under construction
- Location: Makati, Philippines
- Groundbreaking: March 15, 2022
- Estimated completion: 2029
- Owner: Bank of the Philippine Islands

Height
- Height: 224 m (734.91 ft)

Technical details
- Floor count: 45
- Floor area: 89,000 m^{2} (960,000 sq ft)
- Grounds: 5,599 m^{2} (60,270 sq ft)

Design and construction
- Architecture firm: Aidea Philippines
- Developer: Ayala Land
- Other designers: Skidmore, Owings & Merrill
- Main contractor: Makati Development Corporation

The New BPI Headquarters is a skyscraper underconstruction in Makati, Metro Manila, Philippines.

== History ==
=== Old headquarters ===
The Bank of the Philippine Islands (BPI) had its old headquarters in alongside Ayala Avenue and Paseo de Roxas. The old building was designed by Engracio Mariano and was inaugurated in 1982. In 2018, BPI vacated the building in preparation for its demolition which started the following year.

=== New headquarters ===
The New BPI Headquarters will be built on the same site as the 1982 building. The groundbreaking ceremony took place on March 15, 2022.

== Architecture and design ==
The New BPI Headquarters is a 45-storey office tower that with seven levels of basement parking. It will stand on a 5,599 square meters (60,270 sq ft) of land and will have 89,000 square meters (960,000 sq ft) of floor area.

Skidmore, Owings & Merrill (SOM) designed the building with Aidea Philippines Inc. as the architect of record. It is being developed by Ayala Land, while the Makati Development Corporation (MDC) is the general contractor.
