= Senate Blue Ribbon Committee =

Philippine government oversight committee

Committee on Accountability of Public Officers and Investigations
- Senate of the Philippines; 20th Congress

History
- New session started: July 28, 2025

Leadership
- Chair: Erwin Tulfo since June 3, 2026 (Note: Disputed from June 3, 2026 to June 16, 2026)
- Seats: 17

The Senate Committee on Accountability of Public Officers and Investigations of the Senate of the Philippines, or more popularly known as the Blue Ribbon Committee, is the Senate committee tasked to investigate alleged wrongdoings of the government, its officials, and its attached agencies, including government owned and controlled corporations, in aid of legislation, that is, the primary purpose is the suggestion of new laws, or proposals of amendments to existing laws.

Like all other committees, the Senate elects members of the Blue Ribbon Committee. The chairmanship of the committee has been one of the most sought posts in the Senate, aside from the Senate Presidency.

== History ==
Cavite representative Justiniano Montano of the Liberal Party, who was successfully included in the Liberal's 1949 Senate election ticket, supported Jose T. Cajulis of the Nacionalista Party in the elections to the House of Representatives seat he was retiring from. While the Liberals' candidate easily defeated Cajulis, Montano won in the Senate election; he formed a clique called "The Little Senate" with like-minded Liberal senators and began to attack President Elpidio Quirino (who was also from the Liberal Party)'s presidency. Montano then created the Blue Ribbon Committee, taking the name from other blue ribbon committees, with the mandate to investigate alleged irregularities from the executive branch.

Thereafter, the Blue Ribbon Committee has become the most powerful Congressional committee, investigating alleged criminal misconduct by government officials in aid of legislation. However, the committee cannot incarcerate witnesses and resource persons, except in cases of contempt of Congress.

However, the Senate has adopted rules to limit the abuse of this power. These include that all investigations should be "in aid of legislation", the right against self-incrimination should not be violated, the right to counsel should be respected, rules of procedures should be published and persons concerned should be informed of the rules, and the investigation shall not serve as a member's personal aggrandizement.

=== Controversies and scandals investigated ===
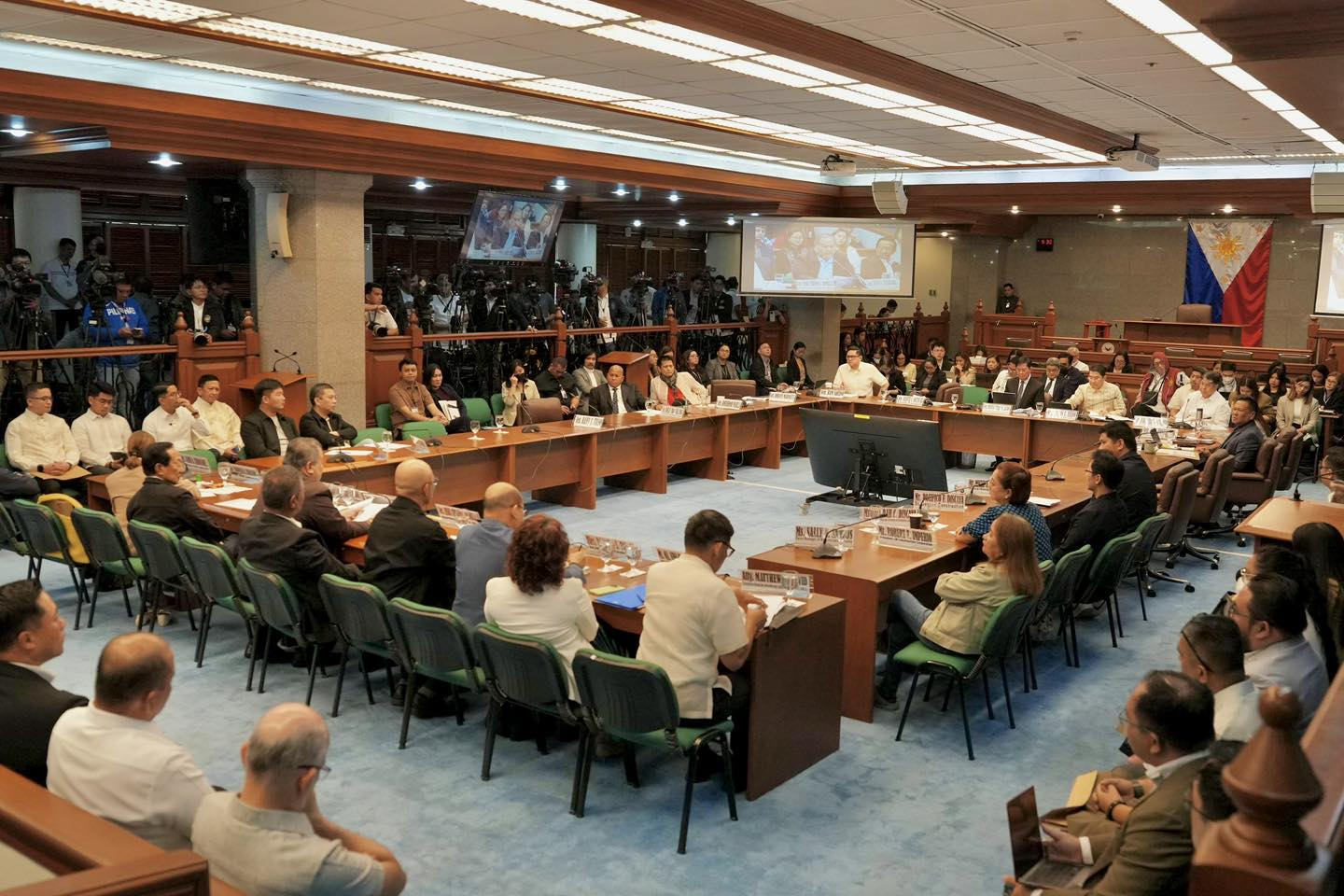
A Senate Blue Ribbon Committee hearing on anomalous government flood control projects on September 23, 2025

Under the presidency of Fidel V. Ramos:

- PEA Amari scam (1995)
- Centennial Expo Scam

Under the presidency of Joseph Estrada:

- Expo Filipino scam (1998)
- Juetengate scandal (2000)

Under the presidency of Gloria Macapagal-Arroyo:

- PIATCO NAIA Terminal 3 scam (2002)
- Macapagal Boulevard scam (2003)
- Fertilizer Fund scam (2004)
- Hello Garci scandal (2005)
- NBN–ZTE deal corruption scandal (2007)
- Euro Generals scandal (2008)

Under the presidency of Benigno Aquino III:

- 2011 Armed Forces of the Philippines corruption scandal (2011)
- Priority Development Assistance Fund scam (2013)
- Jejomar Binay's alleged corruption (2014–2015)
- Bangladesh Bank robbery (2016)

During the presidency of Rodrigo Duterte:

- 2016 Bureau of Immigration bribery scandal (2016)
- 2017 Bureau of Customs drug smuggling scandal (2017)
- Dengvaxia controversy (2017)
- DOT–PTV tourism advertisement controversy (2018)
- 2018 Bureau of Customs drug smuggling scandal (2018)
- Good Conduct Time Allowance and Ninja cops controversies (2019)
- Philippine Health Insurance Corporation corruption scandals (2020–21)
- Pharmally scandal (2021–22)

During the presidency of Bongbong Marcos:

- 2022–2023 Philippine sugar crisis (2023)
- Overpriced and outdated laptops procured by DepEd through PS-DBM
- Wastage of COVID-19 vaccines
- Philippine drug war (2024)
- Flood control projects scandal in the Philippines (2025–)
- Alleged extortion and bribery scheme by personnel from Bureau of Internal Revenue involving the abuse of Letter of Authority for tax audits (2025)

== Jurisdiction ==
According to the Rules of the Senate, the Blue Ribbon Committee handles all matters relating to the following:

- Investigation of malfeasance, misfeasance and nonfeasance in office by officers and employees of the government, its branches, agencies, subdivisions and instrumentalities
- Implementation of the provision of the Constitution on nepotism
- Investigation of any matter of public interest on its own initiative or brought to its attention by any member of the Senate

== Current members ==
Based on the Rules of the Senate, the Senate Blue Ribbon Committee has 17 members.

As of June 17, 2026
Majority	Minority
Erwin Tulfo (Lakas), Chair	Vacant
Kiko Pangilinan (LP), Vice Chair	Vacant
Panfilo Lacson (Independent), Vice Chair	Vacant

Ex officio members:

- Senate President pro tempore Tito Sotto
- Majority Floor Leader Juan Miguel Zubiri
- Minority Floor Leader

Committee secretary: Blue Ribbon Oversight Office Management (BROOM)

== Historical membership rosters ==
=== 20th Congress ===
September 8, 2025 – May 11, 2026
Majority	Minority
Panfilo Lacson (Independent), Chair (Note: Ex officio member as Senate President pro tempore; not counted in the membership.)	Rodante Marcoleta (Independent), Deputy Minority Leader
Erwin Tulfo (Lakas), Vice Chair	Joel Villanueva (Independent), Deputy Minority Leader
JV Ejercito (NPC), Deputy Majority Leader	Jinggoy Estrada (PMP)
Risa Hontiveros (Akbayan), Deputy Majority Leader	Bong Go (PDP)
Bam Aquino (KANP)	Imee Marcos (Nacionalista)
Pia Cayetano (Nacionalista)	Robin Padilla (PDP)
Win Gatchalian (NPC)	
Lito Lapid (NPC)	
Loren Legarda (NPC)	
Kiko Pangilinan (Liberal)	
Raffy Tulfo (Independent)	
Mark Villar (Nacionalista)	

Ex officio members:

- Majority Floor Leader Juan Miguel Zubiri
- Minority Floor Leader Alan Peter Cayetano

Committee secretary: Blue Ribbon Oversight Office Management (BROOM)

July 29 – September 8, 2025
Majority	Minority
Rodante Marcoleta (Independent), Chair	Juan Miguel Zubiri (Independent), Deputy Minority Leader
Alan Peter Cayetano (Independent), Vice Chair	Risa Hontiveros (Akbayan), Deputy Minority Leader
Ronald dela Rosa (PDP), Vice Chair	Panfilo Lacson (Independent)
Bong Go (PDP), Vice Chair	Loren Legarda (NPC)
Erwin Tulfo (Lakas), Vice Chair	
JV Ejercito (NPC), Deputy Majority Leader	
Bam Aquino (KANP)	
Win Gatchalian (NPC)	
Lito Lapid (NPC)	
Imee Marcos (Nacionalista)	
Robin Padilla (PDP)	
Kiko Pangilinan (Liberal)	
Raffy Tulfo (Independent)	

Ex officio members:

- Senate President pro tempore Jinggoy Estrada
- Majority Floor Leader Joel Villanueva
- Minority Floor Leader Tito Sotto

Committee secretary: Rodolfo Noel S. Quimbo

=== 19th Congress ===
January 22, 2024 – June 30, 2025
Majority	Minority
Pia Cayetano (Nacionalista), Chair	Risa Hontiveros (Akbayan), Deputy Minority Leader
Alan Peter Cayetano (Independent), Vice Chair	
Ronald dela Rosa (PDP), Vice Chair	
Bong Go (PDP), Vice Chair	
JV Ejercito (NPC), Deputy Majority Leader	
Mark Villar (Nacionalista), Deputy Majority Leader	
Win Gatchalian (NPC)	
Lito Lapid (NPC)	
Loren Legarda (NPC)	
Imee Marcos (Nacionalista)	
Robin Padilla (PDP)	
Grace Poe (Independent)	
Bong Revilla (Lakas)	
Raffy Tulfo (Independent)	
Joel Villanueva (Independent)	
Juan Miguel Zubiri (Independent)	

Ex officio members:

- Senate President pro tempore Loren Legarda (July 25, 2022 – May 20, 2024)
- Senate President pro tempore Jinggoy Estrada (May 20, 2024 – June 30, 2025)
- Majority Floor Leader Joel Villanueva (July 25, 2022 – May 20, 2024)
- Majority Floor Leader Francis Tolentino (May 20, 2024 – June 30, 2025)
- Minority Floor Leader Koko Pimentel

Committee secretary: Rodolfo Noel S. Quimbo

== List of chairpersons (since 1987) ==
Congress	Chairperson	Party	Years
8th	Teofisto Guingona Jr.	Liberal	1987–1990
8th	Wigberto Tañada	Liberal	1990–1992
9th	Ernesto Maceda	NPC	1992–1993
9th	Heherson Alvarez	LDP	1993–1995
10th	Franklin Drilon	Lakas	1995–1998
11th	Aquilino Pimentel Jr.	PDP–Laban	1998–2001
12th	Joker Arroyo	Aksyon	2001–2004
13th	Joker Arroyo	Independent	2004–2007
14th	Alan Peter Cayetano	Nacionalista	2007–2009
14th	Dick Gordon	Bagumbayan	2009–2010
15th	TG Guingona	Liberal	2010–2013
16th	TG Guingona	Liberal	2013–2016
17th	Dick Gordon	Independent	2016–2019
18th	Dick Gordon	Bagumbayan	2019–2022
19th	Francis Tolentino	PDP–Laban	2022–2023
19th	Pia Cayetano	Nacionalista	2024–2025
20th	Rodante Marcoleta	Independent	2025
20th	Panfilo Lacson	Independent	2025–2026
20th	Pia Cayetano	Nacionalista	2026
20th	Erwin Tulfo	Lakas	2026–present

== See also ==
- Blue-ribbon committee
