= Ferdinand Marcelino =

Filipino military officer

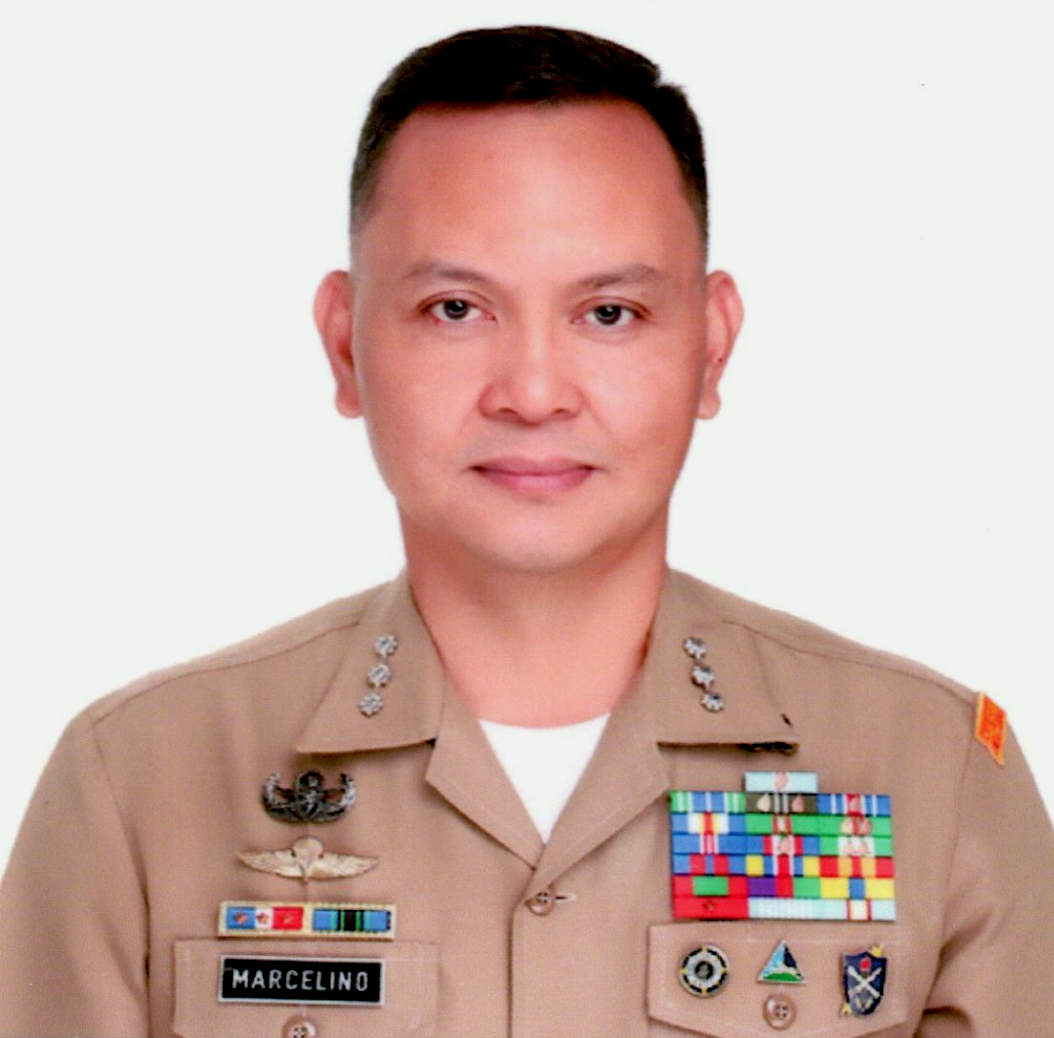
- Brigadier General Ferdinand Marcelino
- Born: January 13, 1973 (age 53)
- Military career
- Allegiance: Philippines
- Branch: Philippine Navy Philippine Marine Corps
- Service years: 1994-
- Rank: Brigadier General
- Commands: The Provost Marshal General of the Armed Forces of the Philippines

Brigadier General Ferdinand Marcelino is an active Marine officer of the Philippine Navy, a graduate of the Philippine Military Academy, class of 1994. Born in Hagonoy, Bulacan, he is the eleventh of 13 children of a fisherman and a housewife. He is currently serving as The Provost Marshal General of the Armed Forces of the Philippines with the rank of Brigadier General.

== Early life ==
Marcelino initially planned to enroll at Pamantasan ng Lungsod ng Maynila but was unable to afford it at the time. Determined to finish his studies, he worked at a construction site at the University of the East in Recto, Manila where he saw a poster of DAWN, the college’s publication. He applied to become one of its staff writers, which helped him pay his tuition. He also became a police beat reporter for the then internationally circulated tabloid, Headline Manila.

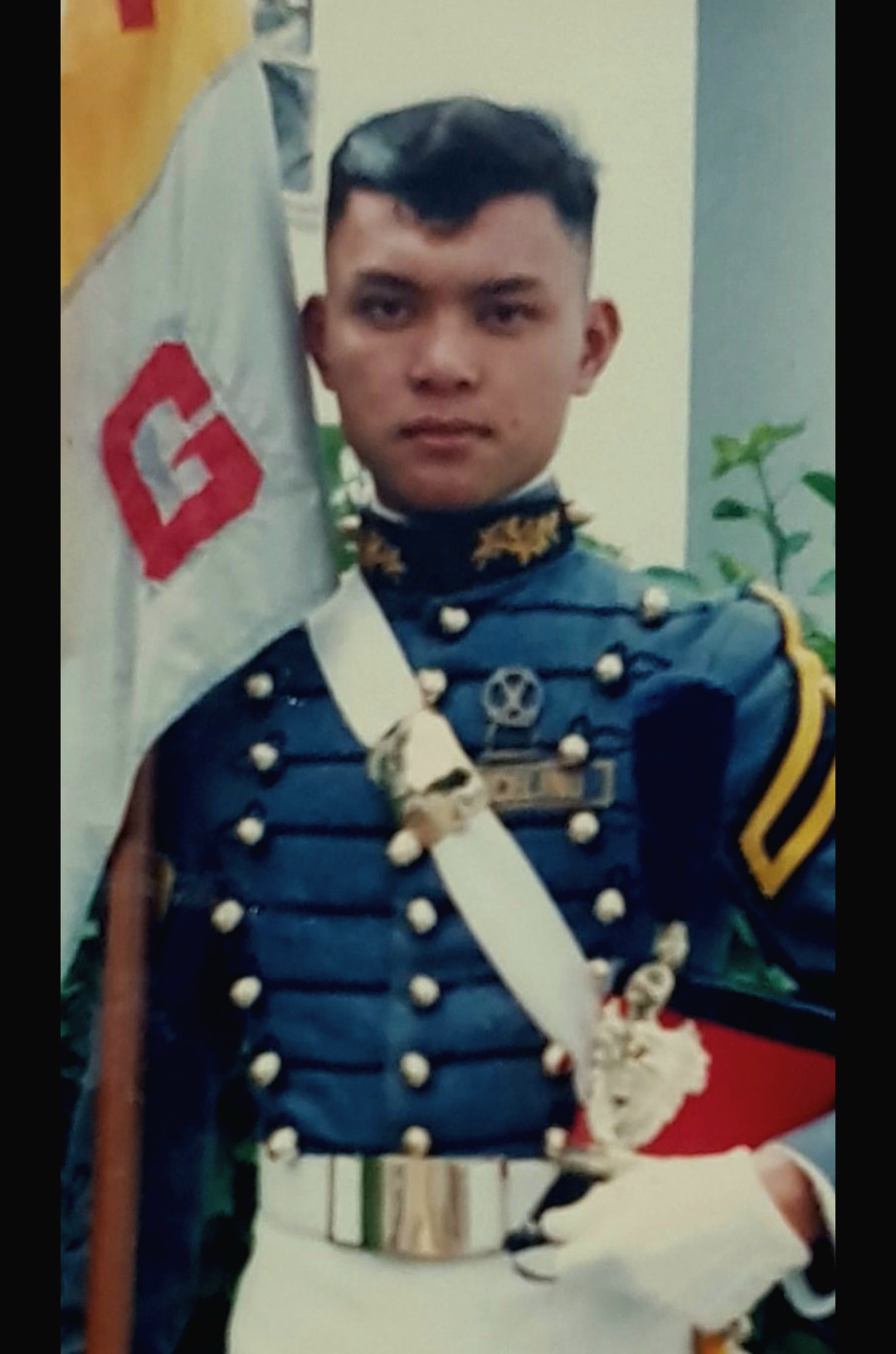
- Marcelino as Philippine Military Academy cadet

== Military career ==
After graduating from the Philippine Military Academy in March 1994, Marcelino joined the Philippine Marine Corps and was deployed in Mindanao, where he spent most of his tour of duty. He rose to become a Marine Company Commander, Battalion Staff Officer, Marine Corps Spokesperson, Flag Secretary to the Marine Corps Commandant, and assumed other positions in the military hierarchy.

== PDEA Involvement ==
BGEN Marcelino began his career in the Philippine Drug Enforcement Agency (PDEA) when he was directed to resolve the case of theft of 21-million pesos worth of shabu from PDEA’s Laboratory Service evidence room in August 2006. Going undercover, then-Captain Marcelino led the operation at a shopping mall in Fairview, Quezon City which led to the arrest of the perpetrators of the theft and who were all PDEA officials and personnel. He participated in a number of other operations conducted by the agency.

== Arrest and Further Developments ==
Early in 2016, and while serving as superintendent of the Philippine Navy Officers Candidate School, Marcelino and a Chinese companion were arrested after they were allegedly caught in a clandestine drug laboratory and accused of manufacturing illegal drugs. Marcelino surrendered to authorities in January 2017 and was acquitted in May of that same year. He resumed his service following his release from custody.
