= LifeBank (Philippines) =

Bank in the Philippines

- Company type: Private rural bank and microfinancial institution
- Industry: Microfinance, Banking & Finance
- Founded: March 21, 1970; 56 years ago in Maasin, Iloilo
- Headquarters: LifeBank RB Head Office - Bypass Road, Santa Barbara, Iloilo; LifeBank MFI Central Office - Gov. F. Caram St., Brgy. Ma. Clara, Iloilo City
- Number of locations: 4 branches and 44 branch lite units (BLU) - LifeBank RB; 536 branches - LifeBank MFI (as of June 2021)
- Key people: Nicanor Perlas (Chairman); Rosario B. Perlas, M.D. (President of LifeBank RB); Vicente Perlas, M.D. (President of LifeBank MFI)
- Products: Deposits, Loans, Microfinance Program, Remittances & Insurance (LifeBank RB); Savings, Microfinance Programs and Loans & Insurance (LifeBank MFI)
- Number of employees: 2,501 (LifeBank MFI); ~500 (LifeBank RB)
- Parent: Perlas Group (LifeBank Group)
- Website: www.lifebankrb.com.ph (LifeBank Rural Bank); www.lifebankmfi.com.ph (LifeBank Microfinance)

LifeBank is a Filipino rural bank based in Iloilo, Philippines. It is divided into two corporate arms each with its own designated finance and banking services functions: the LifeBank RB (LifeBank - A Rural Bank) and LifeBank MFI (LifeBank Microfinance Foundation Inc.).

It started operations on March 21, 1970 in Maasin, Iloilo as Rural Bank of Maasin. As of 2021, it has a total of 4 branches and 44 branch-lite units (BLU) under LifeBank and 536 branches all over the Philippines under LifeBank MFI.

Though LifeBank MFI and LifeBank RB are both participating members of National Microfinance Council, only the LifeBank RB is the sole member of Philippine Deposit Insurance Corporation (PDIC) as bank licensed and supervised under the Bangko Sentral ng Pilipinas (BSP)

For the LifeBank RB, it offers (i) deposit products such as regular Philippine peso and kids passbook savings accounts and foreign currency deposit unit (FCDU) account; loan products like business loan, microfinance program loan (Ikabuhi Microfinance Program), mortgage loan, agri/crop loan, auto loan, salary loan, and Teacher's Salary loan; and money transfer service via Western Union. LifeBank MFI on the other hand, offers savings and loan products like Ikabuhi Microfinance Program (IMP), house repair loan, salary loan (exclusive for its employees), education loan, and housing sanitation loan for poor people.

LifeBank MFI (LBMF) as a non-governmental organization (NGO) and non-profit microfinance company arm of LifeBank, is the third largest microfinance institution in the Philippines. Except for products that it offers for its 300,000+ clients across the Philippines, it played a role in providing social responsible and sustainable programs with significant high societal impact vital in nation building for the benefit of people in the marginalized sector.

== History ==
LifeBank, formerly Rural Bank of Maasin (Iloilo), Inc. was established on March 21, 1970 by the Perlas Family (Familia Perlas) and other prominent members of the community of the Municipality of Maasin, Iloilo. The objective of the bank was to extend financial services in areas where access to credit was limited.

In 1993, the Board of Directors held its first planning and visioning session where the bank’s vision and mission was defined. This was when the Sustainable Development Investment Unit (SDIU) was set up. This was a unit to be developed that would institutionalize lending for sustainable development projects, the objective of which is the development of the human potential.

In June 1995, a branch was established in the Municipality of Santa Barbara, Iloilo. The branch experienced phenomenal growth as its deposits, loan portfolio and resources increased beyond expectations while recognizing and affirming trust within the community. It was also in 1995 that the Ikabuhi Microfinance Program (IMP) was established. The program aims to activate savings and provide credit to enterprising poor women.

In 1998, the bank adopted the Grameen methodology for its micro-finance program, which initially produced positive results. Later on, weaknesses in the management information system and program policies were observed prompting management to look for a better alternative. It was in November 2000 where the bank became a program partner of the Microfinance Support Program (MSP) of the United Nations Development Programme (UNDP where the bank was introduced to the Association for Social Advancement (ASA) (pronounced as ASHA, a Bangladeshi word meaning HOPE). Since then, the bank has been implementing the Association for Social Advancement (ASA) methodology with incredible results as proven by its almost 100% repayment rate, early sustainability and rapid expansion.

After covering most of Iloilo, the Board created the LifeBank Foundation, Inc. (LBF) in January 2003 to carry the expansion of the program outside the province. At the time, the Bank did not have the required capital to operate outside Iloilo province. While LBRB continued to grow in assets and capital, LBF’s microfinance operation grew to cover Panay and other parts of the country (Luzon, Visayas and Mindanao). In 2008, LBRB, having reached the required capitalization to operate in other parts of the country, started purchasing microfinance portfolio from LBF in the provinces of Iloilo, Guimaras, Antique, Aklan and Capiz.

LifeBank RB expanded with a head office in Santa Barbara, Iloilo, (3) branches and forty-four (44) BLUs. The branches are located in Maasin, Iloilo (since March 1970; formerly the Head Office), Iloilo City (since May 2011) and Roxas City, Capiz (since May 2013). In addition, Thirty One (31) Branch Lite Units (BLUs) were established. These are operating in the Provinces of Iloilo (Municipalities of Barotac Nuevo, Miag-ao, Sara, Balasan, Oton, Pototan, Iloilo and Passi City), Guimaras (Municipality of Jordan), Capiz (Municipality of Mambusao), Aklan (Municipalities of Kalibo, Altavas and Caticlan, Malay) and Antique (Municipalities of San Jose, Bugasong and Culasi).

In 2018, LifeBank's NGO microfinance arm was officially renamed from LifeBank Foundation, Inc. to LifeBank Microfinance Foundation, Inc. (LifeBank MFI or LBMF) but was later rolled out in 2019 to all its units. In the said same year, due to its rolling of company decentralization plan, LifeBank MFI has been re-organized into zones and districts with branches in lieu of units.

The LifeBank MFI on the other hand as of December 2021, has 536 branches in Luzon, Visayas and Mindanao, covering 300,000+ clients as the 3rd largest microfinancial institution in the country after ASA Philippines (Philippine arm of ASA, the largest microfinancial institution in the world) and Card Bank.

== Structure ==
The LifeBank's two corporate arms, the LifeBank RB (LBRB) and LifeBank MFI (LBMF), are both managed by the same board of directors/board of trustees. LifeBank MFI is headed by Vicente "Vince" P. Perlas, a medical doctor by profession, while the LifeBank RB's president is his wife, Rosario "Charrie" Perlas, also a medical doctor. Perlas family have long been the one who manages the LifeBank since it was founded on March 21, 1970 as Rural Bank of Maasin (Iloilo), Inc.

The Perlas family which manages LifeBank, are Spanish/European-Filipino family like the Ayala and Zobel, Aboitiz, Lopéz, and Razon families. Through Perlas Group (LifeBank Group), the 2 companies has other sister, affiliate or related companies owned by any member of the said family which include: Seaboard Insurance, Bluefields Hypermart and Bluefields Hardware, Lolo Jose Kitchen and Liv Healthy Kitchen.

Notable member of corporation's Board of Directors/Trustees is Nicanor Perlas (Nick Perlas). A renowned activist and one of the notable alumni of Ateneo de Manila University (ADMU) and Xavier University (Ateneo de Cagayan), he ran as an independent Presidential candidate during the 2010 Philippine National Elections. Nicanor Perlas serves as the Vice-Chairman of LifeBank Microfinance Foundation's (LBMF) Board of Trustees. He is also a laureate of the Right Livelihood Award in 2003, an award referred as an alternative Nobel Prize.
