= Card Bank =

Bank in the Philippines

Card Bank, Inc.
- Company type: Rural Bank
- Industry: Finance
- Founded: September 1, 1997; 28 years ago
- Founder: Jaime Aristotle Alip
- Headquarters: 35 P. Burgos corner Paulino St. San Pablo City, Laguna, Philippines
- Number of locations: 845
- Area served: Philippines
- Key people: Jaime Aristotle Alip (Chairman); Marivic Austria (President and CEO)
- Products: Financial services
- Total assets: ₱16.2 billion (2019)
- Total equity: ₱3.9 billion (2019)
- Number of employees: 5,387 (as of May 2019)
- Website: cardbankph.com

The Center for Agriculture and Rural Development, Inc. (better known as Card Bank, Inc.) is a micro-finance oriented rural bank in the Philippines established in 1997, and is currently regulated by the Bangko Sentral ng Pilipinas. Its main office is located in San Pablo City, Laguna. As of May 2019, Card Bank, Inc. has 750 service offices nationwide.

== History ==
On December 10, 1986, Card Bank, Inc. was organized by the 15 rural development practitioners responsible for the financial services. In 1997, CARD Bank, Inc. received its license from the Bangko Sentral ng Pilipinas and at the same year the bank opened its first office in San Pablo City, Laguna.

Bangko Sentral ng Pilipinas recognized CARD Bank as Hall of Fame awardee for Financial Inclusion in 2013 and Outstanding Financial Inclusion Champion in 2018.

On August 5, 2016, Card Bank, Inc. set up a meeting for the conference with the Al-Qalam Institute for Islamic Identities and Dialogue in Southeast Asia for its partnerships which aim to the communities who need the financial support.
