= List of Mapúa University people =

This is a list of notable alumni and faculty associated with Mapúa University (formerly the Mapúa Institute of Technology) located in Intramuros, Manila and Makati in the Philippines.

== Academe ==
- Creselda Magboo-Roldan, BSArch & MSArch - Dean, School of Engineering, Architecture & Fine Arts, Divine Word College of Calapan
- Peter Ureta, BSCE - Dean of the College of Engineering at FEU Institute of Technology
- Ernesto Endrina, BSArchi - Dean of the College of Architecture at the University of Northern Philippines
- Edwin Obra, BSChE - Dean of the College of Engineering at the Emilio Aguinaldo College
- Antonio Mateo, BSEE - Dean of the College of Engineering at Adamson University
- Melencio Gener, BSME - Dean of the College of Engineering, Architecture and Technology at Palawan State University
- Arturo Trinidad, BSBA - Dean of the University of the East Graduate School of Business Administration
- Jose Mananzan, BSBA - former Dean of the Asian Institute of Tourism at the University of the Philippines
- Herman Gamboa, BSEE - founder of STI Education Services Group
- Demetrio Quirino, HS - Founder of the Technological Institute of the Philippines (TIP)
- Alfredo Ang, BSCE - Professor Emeritus of Civil Engineering; University of Illinois at Urbana-Champaign and University of California at Irvine
- Ricardo Aranas, BSAR - professor at the School of Housing, Building and Planning of the Universiti Sains Malaysia
- Ronnie Catipon, BSEE - professor at the School of Business at Franklin University
- Leon Chua, BSEE - professor at the University of California at Berkeley
- Nicanor Dela Rama, BSME - Dean of the College of Engineering at the Bulacan State University
- Wilfredo Jose, BSChE - professor at the University of the Philippines and Most Outstanding Chemical Engineer of the Year awardee
- Lee Seng Lip, BSCE - Professor and Head of the Department of Civil Engineering, National University of Singapore (NUS)
- Orestes Mapua, BSAR - professor at the School of Housing, Building and Planning of the Universiti Sains Malaysia
- Ricardo Pama, BSCE - former Vice President of the Asian Institute of Technology (AIT) in Bangkok, Thailand and now President of the University of the Cordilleras
- Francis Yu, BSEE - Professor Emeritus of Electrical Engineering, Pennsylvania State University, University of Michigan, and Wayne State University
- Arthur A. De Guia, PhD, BSEE - Professor, University of California - Berkeley
- Guillermo Capati, BSCE/ BSSE, Adjunct Professor at the University of Queensland, Advance Water Management Centre

== Architecture ==
- Gerardo Magat - architect and educator; garnered the highest score in the history of Philippine architecture board examination, 98%
- Pablo Antonio - National Artist for Architecture
- Lor Calma - architect and builder
- Cesar Concio - architect and educator; Gold Medal of Merit awardee from the Philippine Institute of Architects PIA and 1969 Patnubay ng Sining at Kalinangan awardee; former Dean Emeritus of the Mapua Institute of Technology
- William Coscolluela (1997) - architect and recipient of the Gold Medal of Merit award from the Philippine Institute of Architects PIA; awarded BCI Asia Top Ten Architects in the Philippines; founder of W.V. Coscolluela and Associates; projects include RCBC Plaza, Zuellig Building, Philam Life Tower, Robinsons Galleria, SM City North EDSA, and Discovery Shores Boracay
- Paulino Lim (1998) - architect and recipient of the Gold Medal of Merit award from the Philippine Institute of Architects PIA
- Rogelio Villarosa (1997) - architect and recipient of the Gold Medal of Merit award from the Philippine Institute of Architects PIA; founder of R.Villarosa Architects; awarded BCI Asia Top Ten Architects in the Philippines; projects include The Gramercy Towers at Century City, Soho Central, and Hamilo Coast
- Gabino DeLeon (1995), Edilberto Florentino (2002), Froilan Hong (1992), and Jaime Marquez (1997) - architects and recipients of the Outstanding Architect of the Year award from the Professional Regulation Commission PRC
- Manuel Go - architect and builder of commercial landmarks
- Felipe Mendoza - 1982 UAP first LIKHA and Gold Medal awardee; 1976 Patnubay ng Sining at Kalinangan awardee; recipient of the 1982 PRC Outstanding Architect of the Year award
- Jose Mañosa - architect and builder, one of the famed Mañosa brothers
- Armand Commandante, and Josefina Ramos - architects and educators
- Willie Yu - architect and builder; co-founder of G&W Architects; awarded BCI Asia Top Ten Architects in the Philippines,
- Aquiles Caesar Paredes - architect, legislator, educator; committee member to revise the National Building Code; co-founder of the Architecture Advocacy International Foundation; voted the 1991 Outstanding Architect of the Year by the PRC

== Business and industry ==
- Diosdado Banatao, BSEE - founder of S3 Graphics, Ltd.; considered the "Bill Gates of the Philippines"
- Antonio Abacan, Jr., BSBA - President of Metrobank
- Arnel B. Aranas, BSMIE - President of American Standard Philippines
- Oscar Biason, BSMIE - President and CEO of Bankard, Inc.
- Ricardo Buencamino, BSEE - Executive Vice President of the Manila Electric Company (Meralco) and Director of Meralco Industrial Engineering Corp. (MIESCor)
- Rudyardo Bunda, BSBA - Chief Operating Officer of the Union Bank of the Philippines
- Nilo S. Cruz, BSMIE - President of Hewlett-Packard Philippines
- Felizardo dela Merced, BSEE/BSECE - President of Asian Media Development Group and AZ Communications
- Amaury Gutierrez, BSME - former President of Caltex Philippines
- Roberto Huang, BSME - President of San Miguel Brewery Inc.
- Elenita Go, BSEE - General manager at SMC Global Power Holdings Corporation
- Edilberto Palisoc, BSCE - General Manager of D.M. Consunji, Inc. (DMCI), one of the largest construction companies in the Philippines
- Rodolfo Quiambao, BSCE - President and CEO of Rudell and Associates; cited as one of the 50 Outstanding Asian-Americans in Business in the USA
- Eliseo Santiago, BSME - President of Pilipinas Royal Dutch Shell Petroleum Corporation
- Alfonso Supetran, BSChE - founder of ACS Manufacturing Corporation
- Jimmy T. Tang, BSEE - President of the AVESCO Group of Companies; member of the Metrobank Board of Trustees
- Jacinto Tan Uy, BSChE - President and founder of the Moldex Realty Inc., property developers
- Oscar de Venecia, BSCE - chief executive officer of Basic Consolidated
- Augusto Villaluna, BSEM - Senior Vice President of Lepanto Mining Corp and Outstanding Mining Engineer of the Year awardee
- Norman Rabaýa, BSEnt - prominent investor and CEO of the Rabaýa Group.
- Manuel Villar, Jr., HS - businessman; founder of Camella & Palmera Homes, which built over a hundred thousand low- to medium-cost homes
- Angelito Villanueva, BSBA - BancNet Chairman of the Board
- Alfredo Yao - founder of Zesto Corporation, manufacturer of Zest-O fruit drinks and other corporations, including the manufacturers of Beam toothpaste and Quickchow instant noodles
- Manuel Bonoan, Juanito Ferrer and Romulo del Rosario - former National Presidents of the Philippine Institute of Civil Engineers (PICE)
- Gregorio Sadora (1979), Luis Mendoza (1980), Salvador Dulog (1981), Calixto Duria (1982), Hilario Gaerlan (1984), Meleusipo Fonorella (1988), Rafael Florentino (1989), Willington Tan (1990), Fernando Dumuk (1991), Benjamin Carbonell (1994), Gregorio Garces (1997) and Amador Calado (1998) - former National Presidents of the Institute Integrated Electrical Engineers IIEE
- Armando Pascual (1981), Julio Abarquez (1983), Arnaldo Baldonado (1984), Antonio Herrera (1986), Danilo Bulanadi (1990), Augusto Soliman (1994), Gerardo Hernandez (1996), Sergio Balolong (1998), Roberto Lozada (2002), and Danilo Hernandez (2004) - former National Presidents of the Philippine Society of Mechanical Engineers (PSME)
- Angel Lazaro, Jr. - former National President of the United Architects of the Philippines (UAP)
- Rosauro Calupitan, Conrado Hernandez, Severo Santiago, Fortunato Perlas, Rogelio Ramos, and Joel Marciano - former National Presidents of the Institute of Electronics and Communications Engineers of the Philippines
- Jose Saret - President of the Philippine Society of Mining Engineers
- Bayani Fernando, BSME - founder of BF Corporation
- Edward Ray T. Mago, BSCE (1985) - 2022 President, PICE-USA Chapter International Charter I-11 of the Philippine Institute of Civil Engineers (PICE)
- Alfonso U. Lim, BSME - President of Limketkai Sons, Inc.

== Entertainment ==
- FPJ "Da King" Fernando Poe Jr. - actor, film director, producer, screenwriter, and politician.
- Ricky Davao, BSMIE - movie, television and stage actor; 1987 URIAN, Best Actor and 1989 FAMAS, Best Supporting Actor awardee
- Joshua Dionisio, BSIE - GMA 7's teen star and known as Barbie Forteza's love team
- Joseph Ejercito Estrada, HS - FAMAS Hall of Fame awardee; former Mayor, Senator and President of the Philippines
- Augusto "Chiquito" Pangan, HS - popular comedian and 1984 FAMAS Best Actor awardee
- Jerome Ponce - cast member of the hit Philippine daytime series Be Careful With My Heart
- Ariel Ureta, HS - popular radio and television host, director, and comedian
- McCoy De Leon - cast member of Be Careful with My Heart.
- Royce Cabrera - actor under Sparkle GMA Artist Center.
- Yuenyong Opakul - "Aed Carabao" Thai musician, activist, and entrepreneur

== Government and military service ==
- Brig. Gen. Cesar Abella, BSCE - first Commander of the AFP Reserve Command (1991)
- Raul Asis (BSCE)Undersecretaries of the Department of Public Works and Highways
- Edmundo Mir (BSCE)Undersecretaries of the Department of Public Works and Highways
- Romulo del Rosario (BSCE)Undersecretaries of the Department of Public Works and Highways
- Florante Soriquez (BSCE) - Undersecretaries of the Department of Public Works and Highways
- Brig. Gen. Ramon Cannu, BSCE - former Commanding Officer of the AFP 2nd Infantry Division
- Brig.Gen. Dominador Catibog Jr. (BSCE)former Chiefs of the AFP Corps of Engineers
- Brig.Gen. Cesar Gopilan (BSCE)former Chiefs of the AFP Corps of Engineers
- Brig.Gen. Simeon Ver (BSCE) - former Chiefs of the AFP Corps of Engineers
- Belen Gobunsuy-Ceniza, BSChm - Commissioner of the Housing and Land Use Regulatory Board (HLURB)
- Gen. Hermogenes E. Ebdane, Jr., BSCE - former PNP Chief and current Secretary of the Department of Public Works and Highways
- Bayani Fernando, BSME - Former Chairman of the Metropolitan Manila Development Authority; former Secretary of the Department of Public Works and Highways; former Mayor of Marikina
- Ruben A. Hernadez, BSCE - administrator of the Manila Waterworks and Sewerage System (MWSS)
- Lt. Gen. Cardozo M. Luna, BSCE - Undersecretary of Department of National Defense; former Philippine Ambassador to the Netherlands; former Vice Chief of Staff and Lieutenant General of the Armed Forces of the Philippines
- Ramon Allan Oca (BSMnE) - Undersecretary of the Department of Energy
- Gen. Alfredo M. Santos, BSCE - former AFP Chief-of-Staff; became the Philippine's first four-star general in 1962
- Jose Valdecanas, BSCE Undersecretaries of the Department of Transportation and Communications
- Enrico Velasco, BSMIE - Undersecretaries of the Department of Transportation and Communications
- Geronimo Velasco, BSME - former Secretary of the Department of Energy
- Charles Merioles, BSECE - former Chief Information Officer (CIO), Duty Free Philippines Corporation (DFPC)
- Roberto Bernardo, former undersecretary of DPWH who is involved in massive corruption in government projects

== Politics ==
- Jorge Abad, BSCE - former Congressman of Bataan
- Agapito "Butz" Aquino, BSEE - former Senator and now Congressman of Makati; brother of Ninoy Aquino and Tessie Aquino-Oreta
- Efren Arañez, BSCE - former Mayor of Zamboanga City
- Jose Antonio Carrion, HS - Governor of Marinduque
- Telesforo Castillejos, BSCE - Governor of Batanes
- Edilburgo Cheng, BSME - Mayor of Dipolog
- Pedro Cuerpo, BSCE - Mayor of Montalban, Rizal
- Dennis Tanedo Go, BSCE - Mayor of Gerona, Tarlac
- Romeo Dungca, BSIE - Former Mayor of Bacolor, Pampanga
- Aurelio Gonzales Jr., BSCE - 3rd District Congressman of Pampanga and House Senior Deputy Speaker of House of Representatives of the Philippines
- Edwin Santiago, BSME - Former Mayor of San Fernando, Pampanga
- Bayani Fernando, BSME - Former Mayor of Marikina City and Former 1st District Congressman of Marikina City
- Faustino Dy, Jr., BSAR - former Isabela 2nd District Congressman and former Governor of Isabela Province
- Jimmy J. Fragata, BSGeo - Former Mayor of Juban, Sorsogon
- Donato D. Marcos, BSEM - Mayor of Paombong, Bulacan
- Carlito Marquez, BSChE - Governor of Aklan
- Raul Mendoza, BSBA - Mayor of Calumpit, Bulacan
- Frisco F. San Juan, BSCE - former Congressman of Rizal
- Arturo Tolentino, HS - former Congressman, Senator, Senate President, and vice-president of the Philippines
- J. Antonio Lim Sr., HS - former Mayor of Jimenez, Misamis Occidental; founding President, Jimenez Rural Bank Inc.
- Celso Valdecanas, BSCE - Mayor of Balanga, Bataan
- Manuel Villar, Jr., HS - former Speaker of the House of Representatives of the Philippines; former Senate President.
- Erwin Buling, BSEE - former Mayor of San Juan, Southern Leyte; formerly Cabalian, Leyte
- Joseph Salvador Tan, BSCE - Mayor of Santiago City, Isabela
- Haizer B. David, BSCE - Former PPSK President of San Simon, Pampanga

== Science and technology ==
- Arturo Alcaraz, BSMining - expert on geothermal energy; recipient of the Ramon Magsaysay Award (Asia's version of the Nobel Prize) in 1982; born in Manila
- Diosdado Banatao, BSEE - his contributions to the computer industry include the first single-chip, 16-bit microprocessor-based calculator while at Commodore in 1976; the first single-chip MicroVAX for Digital Equipment; the first 10-Mbit Ethernet CMOS with silicon coupler data-link control and trans-receiver chip; got 3Com into the Ethernet PC add-in card business while at Seeq Technology in the early 1980s; the first system logic chip set for the PC-XT and the PC-AT in 1985; and the first enhanced graphics adapter chip set; he was honored by the University of the Philippines and Ateneo de Manila University with a Doctorate Honoris Causa; born in Iguig, Cagayan
- Leon Chua, BSEE - former department chair, University of California, Berkeley, Electrical Engineering; first recipient of the 2005 Gustav Kirchhoff Award, the highest IEEE Technical Field Award, for outstanding contributions to the fundamentals of any aspect of electronic circuits and systems; recipient of the IEEE Neural Networks Pioneer Award in 2000, the IEEE Browder J. Thompson Memorial Prize in 1972, the IEEE W. R. G. Baker Prize in 1978, the Frederick Emmons Award in 1974, and the M. E. Van Valkenhurg Award in 1995 and 1998; holder of 7 US patents and 8 honorary doctorates; recognized by the Institute for Scientific Information as one of the top 15 most-cited authors in all fields of engineering from 1991 to 2001
- Severino Gervacio, BSME - recipient of the 1981 Outstanding Young Scientist Award given by the National Academy of Science and Technology (NAST), and the Lifetime Achievement Award in the Division of Mathematical Sciences given by the National Research Council of the Philippines in recognition of his outstanding achievements in pioneering research in graph theory
- Blandino Go, BSMetE - metallurgist in the aerospace industry; pioneering work on rapidly solidified dispersion strengthened aluminum alloys for high-temperature creep deformation resistance His other research on superplasticity allowed the rapid deployment of super-plastic forming of aluminum and titanium into production in the aerospace industry earlier than expected.
- Antonio Mateo, BSEE - multi-awarded inventor with over 50 patents under his name; acknowledged and cited by the Geneva-based World Intellectual Property Organization; winner in the 27th International Exhibit of Inventions in Switzerland
- Salvador Umotoy, BSEE - Engineering Director at Applied Materials Inc. Sta. Clara, California, USA and holder of 32 US patents in silicon wafer production and research

== Sports ==
- Emilio Achacoso - member of the 1960 Olympic team for basketball
- Carlos Badion - member of the 1956 and 1960 Olympic teams; MVP of the 1960 Asian Basketball Confederation Championship; Philippine Basketball Hall of Fame awardee
- Joel Banal, BSMIE - former basketball coach of the Mapua Cardinals-NCAA champion teams of 1991 and 1992, and Ateneo Blue Eagles, the UAAP champion team of 2002
- Edilberto Bonus - former President of the Philippine Amateur Swimming Association; former MIT math professor and coach of the Mapua Swimming team, which holds the NCAA record for most number of seniors championships; 1951 Asian Games bronze medalist
- Fortunato "Atoy" Co, BSChE - Philippine Basketball Association PBA's 1979 MVP awardee; member of the 1972 Olympic team, the 1973 Asian Basketball Conference champion team, the legendary Crispa Redmanizers, the PBA's Hall of Fame and 25 All-Time Greatest Players; present Head Coach of the Mapua Cardinals Basketball team
- Henry Dagmil - member of the 2008 Philippine Olympic team for track and field; 2005 South East Asian Games gold medalist and record holder in the long jump event
- Freddie Hubalde, Philippine Basketball Association's 1977 Most Valuable Player awardee; member of the legendary Crispa Redmanizers; one of the PBA's 25 All-Time Greatest Players
- Leandro "Leo" Isaac, BSMIE - former Philippine Basketball Association player; captain of the 1980 Mapua Cardinals NCAA Championship team; former coach of the Arellano University Chiefs and the Mapua Cardinals senior basketball teams; current head coach of Red Bull Barako in the PBA
- Perfecto Mendiola - former President of the Philippine Amateur Judo Association; 1956 National Judo champion; member of the 1955 Philippine team to the 1st World Judo Championships
- Renato Naranja - member of the 1972 Olympic team for chess
- Alvin "The Captain" Patrimonio, BSCE - four-time MVP awardee of the Philippine Basketball Association PBA (1991, 1993, 1994 and 1997); member of several Philippine national basketball teams; one of the PBA's 25 All-Time Greatest Players
- Simeon Toribio - member of the 1928, 1932 and 1936 Olympic teams; Olympic bronze medalist in the high jump event at the 1932 Los Angeles Olympics; many-time Asian Games gold medalist; recipient of the 1930 Helms World Trophy for being Asia's greatest athlete
- Emmanuel "Sonny" Sugatan, BSCE - 18 times representative of the Philippines in Bowling from 1976 to 1985; 7th in Bowling World Cup 1977 in Tolworth, England; SEA games gold medalist; 1978 Asian games bronze medalist in Bangkok, Thailand.
- Eugene Torre, BSBA - Asia's first chess Grand Master; Philippine Sports Hall of Fame awardee; member of the 1972 Olympic team for chess
- Miguel White - member of the 1936 Olympic team; Olympic bronze medalist in the 400m hurdles at the 1936 Berlin Olympics
- Israel Catacutan, Benito "Benny" Cheng, Virgilio "Bong" Dela Cruz, Adonis Sta. Maria, Paolo Hubalde, Menardo Jubinal, Rudolph Kutch, Eric Leaño, Romulo Mamaril, Jose Ma. “Jay” Mendoza, Kevin Ramas, Ricardo "Bruise Brother" Relosa, Johnny Revilla, Reuben Dela Rosa, Omanzie Rodriguez, Victor Sanchez, Gerardo "Jack" Santiago, Rodolfo "Rudy" Soriano, Mark Telan, Japeth Aguilar, Edgardo Topacio, Ercito "Chito" Victolero - other former Mapua Cardinals who eventually played in the Philippine Basketball Association PBA

== Others ==
- Norma Riezza-Benzon - Executive Director of a Filipino Disaster Relief Task Force; one of the first community volunteers who responded to the pleas of evacuees by delivering food to affected areas in the wake of Hurricane Katrina in the US in 2006; Dorothy F. Caram Commitment to Leadership Awardee and Gawad Geny Lopez Bayaning Pilipino Awardee
- Scout Paulo Cabrera Madriñan - Scoutmaster and member of the Philippine delegation to the fateful 11th World Scout Jamboree in 1963; a street in Roxas District of Quezon City was named in his honor.
- Archimedes Trajano - human rights victim and martyr of the Martial Law dictatorship
- Sister Ma. Aida Vasquez, OSB, BSChE - environmental activist
