= Cathy Cabral =

Filipino civil engineer (1962–2025)

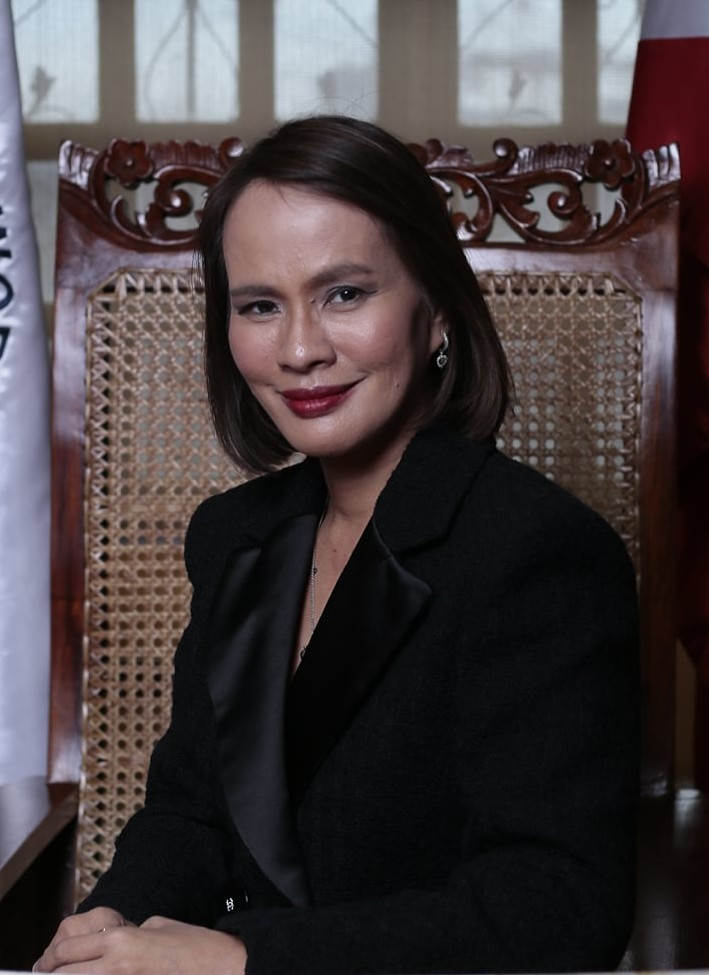
- Official portrait, 2021

Undersecretary for Planning and Public–Private Partnership of Department of Public Works and Highways
- In office November 10, 2014 – September 16, 2025
- President: Benigno Aquino III; Rodrigo Duterte; Bongbong Marcos
- Succeeded by: Nicasio A. Conti

Alternate Member of the Board of Directors of the National Irrigation Administration
- Incumbent
- Assumed office August 22, 2017

Personal details
- Born: Maria Catalina Estamo; May 23, 1962 Manila, Philippines
- Died: December 18, 2025 (aged 63) Tuba, Benguet, Philippines
- Spouse: Cesar Cabral
- Children: 2
- Education: University of the East (BS); Manuel L. Quezon University (MBA, PhD, DPA); Lyceum of the Philippines University (MEc); University of Asia and the Pacific (MBE)
- Occupation: Civil engineer, public administrator
- Profession: Civil engineer

Maria Catalina "Cathy" Estamo Cabral (May 23, 1962 – December 19, 2025) was a Filipino civil engineer and government official who served as undersecretary for planning and public–private partnership at the Department of Public Works and Highways (DPWH) from 2014 to 2025. Cabral became the first woman from the department's rank-and-file workforce to be appointed as an undersecretary.

Cabral began her career at the Department of Public Works and Highways as a civil engineering aide before becoming undersecretary for planning and public–private partnership in 2014. Outside the department, she led professional engineering organizations, including the Philippine Institute of Civil Engineers and the Road Engineering Association of the Philippines. In 2021, the Professional Regulation Commission recognized her as the Outstanding Professional of the Year in Civil Engineering, and the following year she received the TOFIL Award for Government and Public Service.

In 2025, Cabral came under scrutiny over allegations of budget irregularities involving the proposed 2026 national budget and a possible kickback scheme linked to public infrastructure projects. She resigned from DPWH on September 14 and died in Benguet on December 19.

== Education ==
Cabral attended Holy Trinity Academy, where she completed her elementary and secondary education from 1969 to 1979. She obtained a degree in civil engineering from the University of the East, and pursued graduate studies at Manuel L. Quezon University, followed by doctoral studies in Urban and Regional Planning at the University of the Philippines. Cabral pursued additional graduate studies at the Lyceum of the Philippines University by getting a master’s degree in Economics in 2007 and later, a master’s degree in Strategic Business Economics from the University of Asia and the Pacific in 2015. She also attended executive programs at the Mohamed bin Zayed University, Harvard Kennedy School, and the Wharton School.

== Career ==
Cabral speaking at the APEC Ministerial Meeting in 2015

Cabral joined the Department of Public Works and Highways as a civil engineering aide. After obtaining her engineering license, she advanced through a series of technical and administrative positions. In 2011, while serving as Assistant Secretary for Planning, she participated in a meeting with Public Works Secretary Rogelio Singson and Regional Development Council chairpersons to finalize the inclusion of an initial ₱500 million allocation for Albay's flood control project in the proposed 2012 National Expenditure Program.

In November 2014, Cabral was appointed undersecretary for planning and public-private partnership. She supervised infrastructure planning, programming, and public–private partnership initiatives and remained in office under multiple DPWH secretaries. In 2017, she also served as an alternate member of the National Irrigation Administration Board of Directors. Cabral held leadership roles in professional engineering organizations, serving as national president of the Philippine Institute of Civil Engineers (PICE) before becoming president of the Road Engineering Association of the Philippines from 2019 to 2021. Cabral held the position of Professional Chair in Engineering Science and Technology at the Polytechnic University of the Philippines. She also served as a commissioned officer in the Reserve Force of the Armed Forces of the Philippines, holding the rank of lieutenant colonel in the Philippine Army.

In 2023, Cabral served as chairperson of the DPWH's Gender and Development Focal Point System, where she helped oversee the department's gender mainstreaming programs. In the same year, she represented the department in receiving two GADtimpala awards from the Philippine Commission on Women. According to DPWH Undersecretary Roberto Bernardo, Cabral developed the Baselined, Balanced and Managed (BBM) Parametric Formula, which was first used to compute the department's budget for the 2023 General Appropriations Act under the administration of President Bongbong Marcos.

== Controversy ==
In 2025, Cabral became involved in a scandal of supposed budget irregularities and a kickback system tied to public infrastructure projects. Reports linked her to the inclusion of projects favored by certain lawmakers into the 2026 government budget, which led to her being investigated by the Senate Blue Ribbon Committee. During hearings, some officials questioned inconsistencies in her statements, and former DPWH officials alleged that she played a key role in determining which projects were included and that some funds may have been diverted as kickbacks. On September 7, Senator Panfilo Lacson alleged that Cabral communicated with the office of Senator Tito Sotto following the 2025 Philippine general election concerning proposals for inclusion in the 2026 national budget.

Cabral resigned on September 16, 2025, which was accepted by the Secretary of DPWH Vince Dizon on September 16. Despite stepping down, she was later summoned to attend Senate hearings as a private citizen to answer further questions about the alleged irregularities. On December 24, documents that Cabral had allegedly shared prior to her death were made public by Batangas Representative Leandro Leviste. The files, which were claimed to have been compiled by Cabral in the latter part of 2025, included alleged budget information and project allocation of DPWH within different legislative districts from 2023 to 2026. Following the release of the documents, questions were raised by Leviste, the DPWH, and the Office of the Ombudsman regarding their authenticity and how they had been obtained.

== Personal life and death ==
Cabral had two siblings and was raised by their widowed mother. She was married to Cesar Cabral, and they had two daughters.

On December 18, 2025, Cabral was found near the Bued River along Kennon Road in Tuba, Benguet, and was declared dead shortly after midnight on December 19. According to Baguio Mayor Benjamin Magalong, Cabral had been traveling with her driver that day and twice asked to be dropped off along Kennon Road before she was reported missing. Cabral was recovered from the side of the Bued River, approximately 20 to 30 meters (66 to 98 ft) below the highway, by police and emergency responders. The Benguet Provincial Police and the Office of the Ombudsman ordered the preservation of her mobile phone and other personal devices for forensic examination.

Interior Secretary Jonvic Remulla said that, pending autopsy results and witness interviews, those who had been with Cabral before her death were considered persons of interest, although suicide was not initially viewed as the leading possibility. On December 20, the initial autopsy found that Cabral had died from blunt force trauma, including multiple fractures to her face and feet. On December 22, Remulla said that the available evidence indicated that she had died by suicide.

In January 2026, Cabral's lawyer Mae Divinagracia, said that Cabral had attempted suicide twice at her home while she was under investigation over alleged irregularities in flood control projects. According to Divinagracia, the first attempt occurred shortly after Cabral was implicated during a Senate hearing, while the second took place before her death.

== Honors and recognition ==
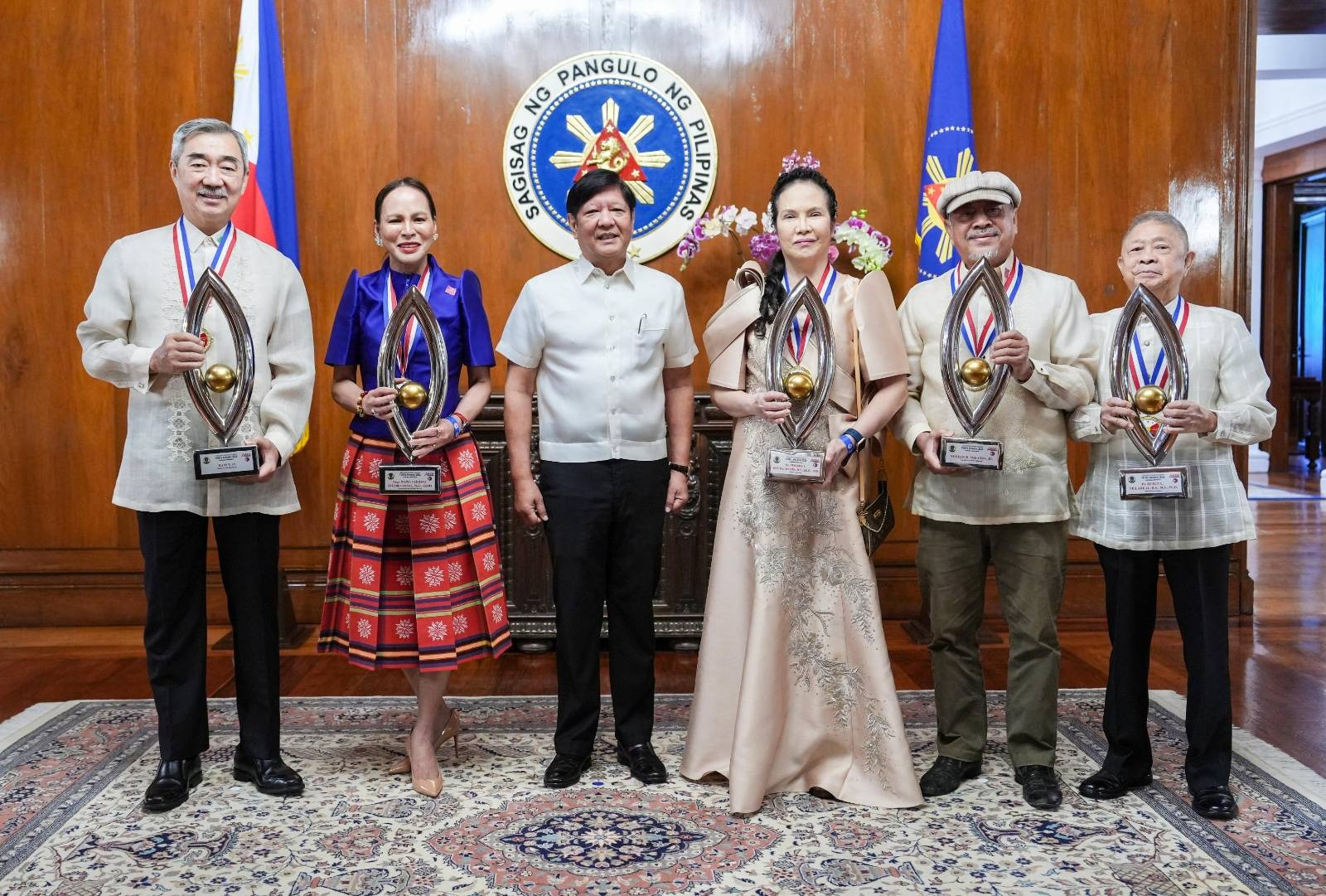
Cabral (left) beside President Bongbong Marcos during the Outstanding Filipino (TOFIL) Award ceremony at Malacañang Palace in 2022.

- GADtimpala 2018 Citation from the Philippine Commission on Women (2019)
- GREE Women in Engineering Award nominee (2019)
- Excellence Award from the Philippine Federation of Professional Associations (2020)
- PEZA Galing Pinas Ecozone Partnership Award (2021)
- Professional Regulation Commission Outstanding Professional of the Year in Civil Engineering (2021)
- United Nations Public Service Awards for Gender Equality nominee (2022)
- TOFIL Award for Government and Public Service (2022)
- Asian Civil Engineering Coordinating Council Achievement Award nominee (2022)
- Manila Times Global Excellence Award (2023)
- Brand Asia Award for Top Leader of Excellence in Humanitarian and Public Service (2023)
- Philippine Resilience Awards for Women (2023)
- Women's International Network on Disaster Risk Reduction (WIN DRR) Award nominee (2024)
- Presidential GAWAD CES nominee (2024)
- Circle of Excellence Awardee ASIA-CEO Woman of the Year (2024)
