= Philippine Business Bank =

Bank in the Philippines

- Company type: Public
- Traded as: PSE:PBB
- Industry: Banking; Finance
- Founded: Manila, Philippines (1997)
- Headquarters: Caloocan, Philippines
- Key people: Alfredo Yao, (Chairman Emeritus); Jeffrey S. Yao, (Chairman); Rolando R. Avante, (President and CEO)
- Products: Banking
- Net income: PHP938.88 million (2020)
- Owner: Alfredo Yao (majority owner through AMY Group)
- Number of employees: 1,511 (as of Dec 2018)
- Website: www.pbb.com.ph

Philippine Business Bank (PBB, also known in Hokkien Chinese: 菲律賓商業銀行 / 菲商業銀行; Pe̍h-ōe-jī: Hui-li̍p-pin Siong-gia̍p Gûn-hâng; & Mandarin simplified Chinese: 菲律宾商业银行 / 菲商业银行; traditional Chinese: 菲律賓商業銀行 / 菲商業銀行; pinyin: Fēilǜbīn Shāngyè Yínháng) is a Filipino savings bank which focuses on corporate and small and medium enterprises markets. It provides banking services and products including cash management, retail and corporate lending, deposit products, international trade finance, treasury and trust products.

Its head office is located in Caloocan and has a total of 159 branches as of December 2019; the bank has a network of 71 Automated Teller Machines (ATMs), of which 23 are located in Metro Manila and the remaining 14 are in various provinces. The bank is the second largest savings bank in the Philippines as of December 31, 2022.

== History ==
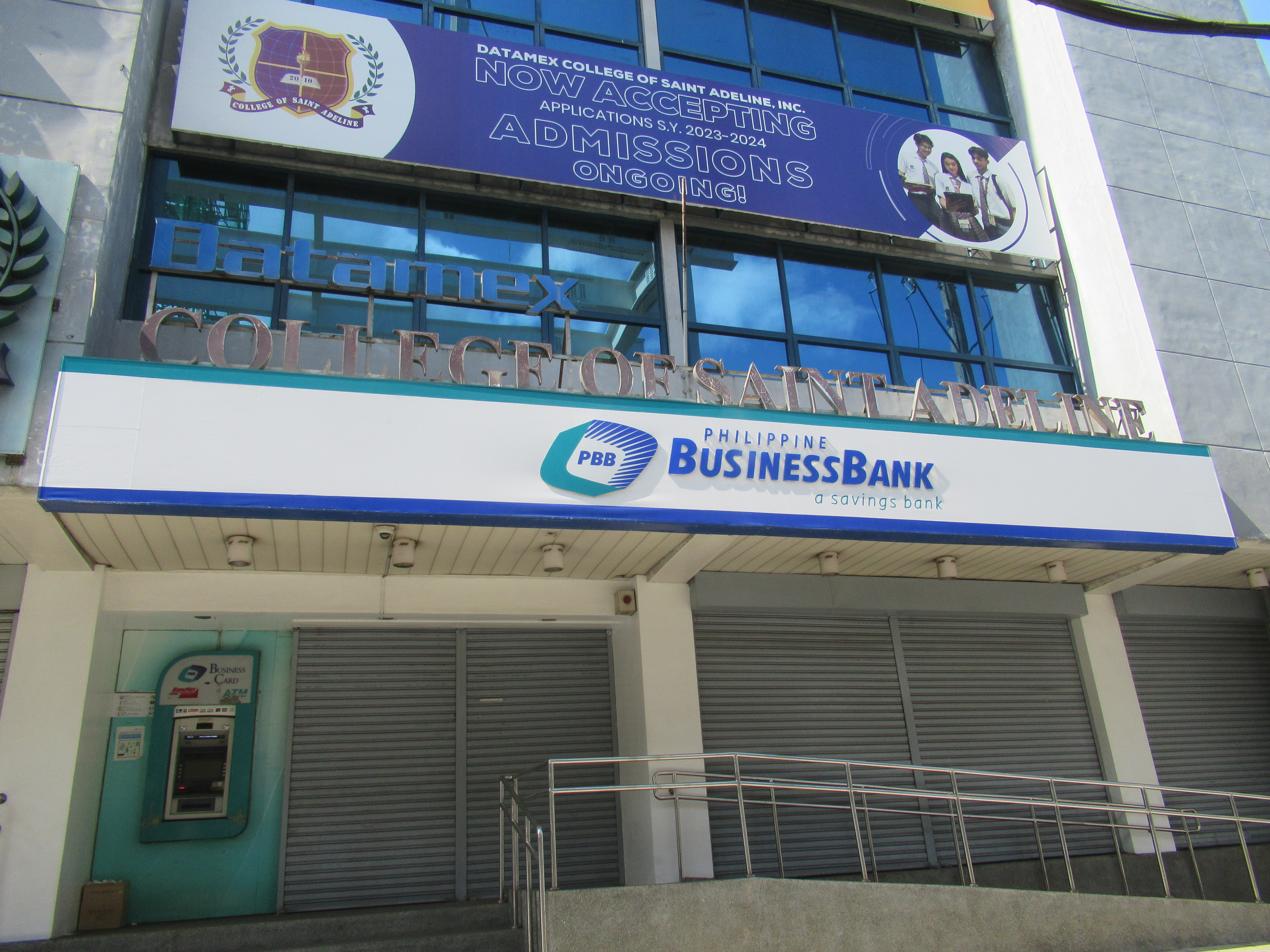
A Philippine Business Bank branch in Quezon City

Philippine Business Bank started operations on February 12, 1997, as Total Savings Bank. Before the year ended, it obtained approval from the Philippines Securities and Exchange Commission (SEC) to change its corporate name to the current one. To keep itself close to the small and medium scale businesses which includes both small and medium enterprises (SMEs) and large companies which it seeks to serve, PBB operates from its head office in Caloocan unlike other banking institutions in the Philippines which hold office in the plush Makati or Ortigas business centers as favored by other banks.

Although considered a newcomer in the banking community, PBB established 10 branches in its first year. By the end of its second year, it had 15 branches in Metro Manila and neighboring business centers. The bank aims to branch out into the country's other business hubs. In January 2013, PBB announced plans to expand its nationwide network of 78 branches to 100 by year-end. The first phase of expansion will focus on Luzon, especially the Metro Manila area, and additional branches will be used to reach out to the Philippines’ growing SME industry, which accounts for 63 per cent of PBB's total loan portfolio.

In early 2013, PBB has announced an initial public offering (IPO) at the Philippine Stock Exchange in Manila to fund its nationwide expansion to 100 branches by the end of 2013. The IPO raised $98.8 million.

As of end of December 2013, PBB had a total of 100 branches across the country and received regulatory approval to open up 26 new branches in 2014 in various locations in Luzon, Visayas and Mindanao as part of its purposes of expanding its network more closer to the SME market.

In 2013 former ambassador Alfredo Yao, the major shareholder of the bank, was awarded the Grand MVP Bossing title (an annual nationwide search for top Filipino entrepreneurs organized by Manuel V. Pangilinan’s Philippine Long Distance Telephone Company and Go Negosyo).

As of December 31, 2021; PBB had a total of 165 branches across the country with opening of branches like Candon in Ilocos Sur, La Trinidad in Benguet and Calasiao in Pangasinan. PBB as of December 31, 2022, is the Philippines' second largest savings bank with a Total Assets of ₱155,001.64 billion

== Parent company ==
Philippine Business Bank is a part of the AMY Group, a conglomerate of companies owned by Alfredo Yao which is also the majority owner of Zest-O Corporation, a beverage company best known for its namesake juice products; PSEi listed companies under AMY Group includes PBB and Macay Holdings.
