= ASEP =

ASEP may mean:

- Asep, a male given name from Sundanese
- American Society of Exercise Physiologists
- Asymmetric simple exclusion process, in statistical physics
- Australasian Society for Experimental Psychology
- Association of Structural Engineers of the Philippines, Inc
- Supreme Council for Personnel Selection (Anótato Symvoúlio Epilogís Prosopikoú ), an independent commission tasked with the selection of personnel for work for the Greek public sector
