= Teacher eduation in the Philippines =

Teacher Education in the Philippines is under the Teacher Education Council (TEC) which is composed of the Department of Education (DepEd), Commission on Higher Education (CHED), Technical Education and Skills Development Authority (TESDA), National Commission for Culture and the Arts (NCCA), and the Professional Regulation Commission (PRC).

== History ==
On June 18, 1966, Republic Act No. 4670, or the Magna Carta for Public School Teachers, was approved.

On June 15, 1968, Republic Act No. 5250, or An Act Establishing a Ten-Year Training Program For Teachers of Special and Exceptional Children in the Philippines and Authorizing the Appropriation of Funds Thereof, was approved.

In August 4,1994, Republic Act No. 7784, or An Act to Strengthen Teacher Education in the Philippines by Establishing Centers of Excellence, Creating a Teacher Education Council for the Purpose, Appropriating Funds Therefor, and For Other Purposes, was approved.

On December 16, 1994, Republic Act No. 7836, or the Philippine Teachers Professionalization Act of 1994, was approved.

In April 21 2004, the Republic Act No. 9293, which amends Republic Act No. 7836 or the Philippine Teachers Professionalization Act of 1994, was approved.

On July 21, 2016, Republic Act No. 10912, or the Continuing Professional Development Act of 2016, was approved.

On April 27, 2022, Republic Act No. 11713, or the Excellence in Teacher Education Act, which amends Republic Act No. 7784, was approved.

In May 31, 2024, Republic Act No. 11997, or the Kabalikat sa Pagtuturo Act, was approved.

In September 12, 2025, Republic Act No. 12288, or the Career Progression system for Public School Teachers and School Leaders Act, was approved.

On October 10, 2025, a Joint Memorandum Circular No. 01, s. 2025 was issued by the CHED, PRC, and TESDA for the "Rationalization and Harmonization of Professional and Technical Education and Skills Development Standards.

On October 16, 2025, the Teacher Education Roadmap 2035 was launched by the Teacher Education Council.

== Statistics ==
=== Basic Licensure Examination for Professional Teachers ===
Date of Examination	Elementary Teachers	Total Examinees	Percentage	Secondary Teachers	Total Examinees	Percentage	References
March 17, 2024	20,890	44,764	46.67%	50,539	85,980	58.78	
September 29, 2024	20,025	44,002	45.51%	48,875	85,926	56.88%	
March 23, 2025	16,282	34,810	46.77	38,747	62,225	62.27%	
September 21, 2025 and November 30, 2025	21,967	43,035	51.04%	57,729	79,493	72.62%	
March 15, 2026	18,376	32,796	56.03%	45,001	61,561	73.10%	

== Teacher Education Programs ==
=== Undergraduate Programs ===
The following is the list of Undergraduate Programs in Teacher Education Institutions.

- Bachelor of Early Childhood Education (BECEd)
- Bachelor of Elementary Education (BEEd)
- Bachelor of Secondary Education
  - major in English (BSEd English)
  - major in Filipino (BSEd Filipino)
  - major in Science (BSEd Science)
  - major in Mathematics (BSEd Mathematics)
  - major in Social Science (BSEd Social Science)
  - major in Values Ed (BSEd Values Ed)
- Bachelor of Physical Education (BPEd)
- Bachelor of Sciences in Lexicography (BSL)
- Bachelor of Science in Exercise and Sports Sciences (BSESS)
- Bachelor of Culture and Arts Education (BCAEd)
- Bachelor of Special Needs Education (BSNEd)
- Bachelor of Technology and Livelihood Education (BTLEd)
- Bachelor of Technical and-Vocational Teacher Education (BTVTEd)
- Bachelor of Library and Information Science

=== Graduate Programs ===
The following is the list of Graduate Programs in Teacher Education Institutions.

- Master of Arts in Child Study
- Master of Arts in Curriculum and Instruction
- Master of Arts in Educational Assessment and Evaluation
- Master of Arts in Educational Leadership and Management
- Master of Arts in Reading Education
- Master of Arts in English Language Education
- Master ng Sining sa Edukasyong Pangwika sa Filipino
- Master of Arts in Mathematics Education
- Master of Arts in Science Education
- Master of Arts in Counseling
- Master of Arts in Social Science Education
- Master of Arts in Values Education
- Master in Library and Information Science
- Master of Arts in Early Childhood Education
- Master of Arts in Educational Technology
- Master of Arts in lementary Education
- Master of Arts in Special Needs and Inclusive Education
- Master in Physical Education
- Master of Arts in Education in Music Education
- Doctor of Philosophy in Applied Linguistics
- Doctor of Philosophy in Curriculum and Instruction
- Doctor of Philosophy in Educational Leadership and Management
- Doctor of Philosophy in Reading Education
- Doctor of Philosophy in English Language Education
- Doktor ng Pilosopiya sa Edukasyong Pangwika sa Filipino
- Doctor of Philosophy in Mathematics Education
- Doctor of Philosophy in Science Education
- Doctor of Philosophy in Counseling
- Doctor in Physical Education and Sports

== Teacher Education Council ==
The Teacher Education Council (TEC), in accordance with Republic Act No. 11713, is composed of the following:

Member	Position
Secretary of the Department of Education (DepEd)	Chairperson
Chairperson of Commission on Higher Education (CHED)	Vice-Chairperson
Director General of Technical Education and Skills Development Authority (TESDA)	Member
Executive Director of National Commission for Culture and the Arts (NCCA)	Member
Chairperson of the Professional Regulation Commission (PRC)	Member

=== Teachers Education Centers of Excellence ===
The TEC designates schools as Teacher Education Centers of Excellence in accordance with Republic Act No. 7784 as amended by Republic Act No. 11713.

=== List of Teachers Education Centers of Excellence ===
School	Location	Reference
Bicol University College of Education (BUCE)	Bicol	
De La Salle University Br. Andrew Gonzalez FSC College of Education	Manila	
Pangasinan State University Bayambang Campus	Pangasinan	
Saint Louis University (SLU) School of Teacher Education and Liberal Arts (STELA)	Baguio	
UP Diliman College of Education (CEd)	Quezon City	

== Scholarship ==
=== Teacher Education Scholarship Program ===
The Teacher Education Scholarship Program (TESP) is established by Republic Act No. 11713. In June 3, 2026, the TEC in partnership with CHED launched the TESP with the budget over 100 million to support 720 aspiring teachers nationwide.

=== CHED Scholarship ===
the Scholarship for Instructors' Knowledge Advancement Program (SIKAP) is a scholarship program under the CHED for teaching and non-teacher personnel of Higher Education Institutions. The CHED advises to use the CHED official website and official social media page to safeguard on fake announcements.

== See also ==
- Education in the Philippines
- Normal school
- Teacher education
