= Daniel Go =

Filipino architect of Chinese descent (born 1966)

- Born: Daniel Chu Go; March 23, 1966 (age 60); Philippines
- Education: University of Santo Tomas
- Occupation: Architect
- Practice: Daniel C. Go Architecture Design & ADGO Architecture and Design Inc*
- Buildings: CCF Center; BTTC Centre

Daniel Go (born March 23, 1966) is a Filipino architect of Chinese descent. Go founded Daniel C. Go Architecture Design, and ADGO Architecture and Design Inc., and is its principal architect. His buildings include the CCF Center in Pasig, and BTTC Centre – the first LEED certified building in San Juan in the Philippines – aside from other residential and commercial establishment projects. He and his wife also manage a printing and packaging business among other business endeavors. In 2006 he became a Fellow at the United Architects of the Philippines (UAP), and became a registered APEC Architect in 2008 and a registered ASEAN Architect in 2015.

== Personal life ==
Born on March 23, 1966, Daniel Chu Go is the eldest of five sons of Chinese parents, with a businessman father who eventually became a pastor. The Go family is based in Quezon City, Philippines, and runs a processed and preserved food manufacturing business specializing in Chinese delicacies – started by his grandfather in the 1940s and still popular today among the Chinese community.

His family's Chinese food business manufactures the famous Fat & Thin champoy candy, which had his father's cartoons and caricatures imprinted on the wrapper. And Go spent most of his time watching his father work, eventually acquiring the same love for the art.

As a young boy, Daniel Go showed considerable interest and skill in the visual arts during summer art classes and school competitions when he attended primary school at Grace Christian High School, from 1973 to 1979, and at Jubilee Christian Academy – both in Quezon City – from 1979 to 1984 for his secondary education.

He decided to pursue his talent for drawings and illustrations by taking up Bachelor of Science in Architecture at the College of Architecture and Fine Arts of the University of Santo Tomas in Manila, where he graduated cum laude from the graduating class of 1989. He was then recognized as one of the Distinguished Thomasian Alumni Architect

Daniel Go is married, and a father to four children – one daughter and three sons.

As a diversion from his work Go also has a passion for restoring cars, and consider golf as his way to unwind. He spends a lot of his leisure time with his family and travels a lot to learn the arts from different cultures.

== Career ==
After graduating in 1989, Go briefly worked as an apprentice to Architect Jose Siao Ling where he was designated to work as a draftsman. Not long after his apprenticeship with Architect Jose Siao Ling, he took up and passed his Architect Licensure Examination in 1991 and he then practiced architecture professionally.

In 1996, Go established his own firm named Daniel C. Go & Associates now known as Daniel C. Go Architecture Design (DCGA). Then in 2006, he was conferred and elevated to the College of Fellows in the Field and Category of Design of the United Architects of the Philippines (UAP) During the same year, he established ADGO Architecture and Design Inc. (ADGO), this time tackling bigger projects alongside a pool of younger architects. In 2008, Go was conferred as an APEC (Asia-Pacific Economic Cooperation) Architect.

The Christ’s Commission Fellowship Worship and Training Center (known as CCF Center) – completed in 2013 – was Go’s first big project because during that time, Go had not designed anything of this magnitude, and designing and erecting this project took him seven years. The CCF Center is the international headquarters of the non-denominational megachurch called Christ's Commission Fellowship (CCF). The 11-storey ministry building with more than 97,000 square metres (1,040,000 sq ft) of floor area and an estimated seating capacity of 10,000, located in a 2.3-hectare (5.7-acre) lot in Pasig is one of the largest worship centers in the Philippines.

Aside from the CCF Center, another major project of Architect Go is the BTTC Centre in Greenhills, San Juan. Completed in 2013, the BTTC Centre is a LEED Gold certified building for Leadership in Energy and Environmental design from the US Green Building Council (USGBC). It is the first LEED Certified building in San Juan, and the first LEED Certified project of Architect Go.

Architect Daniel Go’s design philosophy is centered on his own brand of classicism, which he defines as both timeless and inspirational. He fuses classical and modern styles, creating sleek and modern living spaces more for practicality.

In 2025, Architect Daniel Go has been awarded as one of the 50 Notable Architects of the Philippines, recognition was given during the celebration of the United Architects of the Philippines' Golden Jubilee and 50th National Convention held last April 18, 2025 at the Solaire Resort & Casino.

== Notable works ==
- BTTC Centre (Green Building project) – Ortigas Avenue corner Roosevelt St., Greenhills, San Juan (Completed 2012)
- Christ’s Commission Fellowship Worship and Training Center – Ortigas Avenue corner C-5 Road, Pasig (Completed 2013)
- High Pointe Medical Hub – Shaw Boulevard corner Yulo St., Bagong Silang, Mandaluyong (Completed 2017)
- Primer Distribution Center – West Service Road, Cupang, Muntinlupa (Completed 2018)
- Motortrade Corporate Center – EDSA, Sierra Madre, Mandaluyong (Completed 2019)
- Christian Bible Church of the Philippines (CBCP) Church Building - Eugenio Lopez Drive corner Samar Avenue, Quezon City (Completed 2020)
- Brilliance Center by NAPPCO - 11th Avenue corner 40th Street, Bonifacio Global City (Completed 2020)
- One Oculus Center – Chino Roces Avenue, Pio Del Pilar, Makati (Completed 2020)
- Grupovino Warehouse Building – Dasmariñas Technopark, Dasmariñas, Cavite (Completed 2020)
- CMG Building – Jose Cruz Street, Ugong, Pasig (Completed 2022)
- Benby Mega DC Calamba – Silangan Industrial Park Road, Canlubang, Laguna (Completed 2023)
- DS Finance Corporate Office Building - Mindanao Avenue Ext, Q.C. (Completed 2023)
- Windsor Square - San Lorenzo, Makati (Completed 2025)
- Blue Mountain Warehouse Complex - First Bulacan Industrial City (FBIC), Bulacan (Completed 2025)
- Espa-Fil Mercantile Building - Mandaluyong (Completed 2025)
- First SLP Multi-Unit Warehouse Complex - El Salvador, Misamis Oriental, Mindanao (Completed 2026)

== Recognition and distinctions ==
- Conferred and elevated to the College of Fellows in the Field and Category of Design of the United Architects of the Philippines (UAP) (2006)
- Registered APEC Architect (2008)
- Executive Director, Commission on Professional Practice of United Architects of the Philippines (UAP) National Board of Directors (2009-2010)
- Registered ASEAN Architect (2015)
- Outstanding Professional of the Year Award (OPYA) in the Field of Architecture (2020) by Professional Regulation Commission (PRC)
- Distinguished Thomasian Alumni Awards (2023) by University of Santo Tomas (UST)
- 50 Notable Architects Award (2025) by United Architects of the Philippines (UAP)
