= United Architects of the Philippines Student Auxiliary =

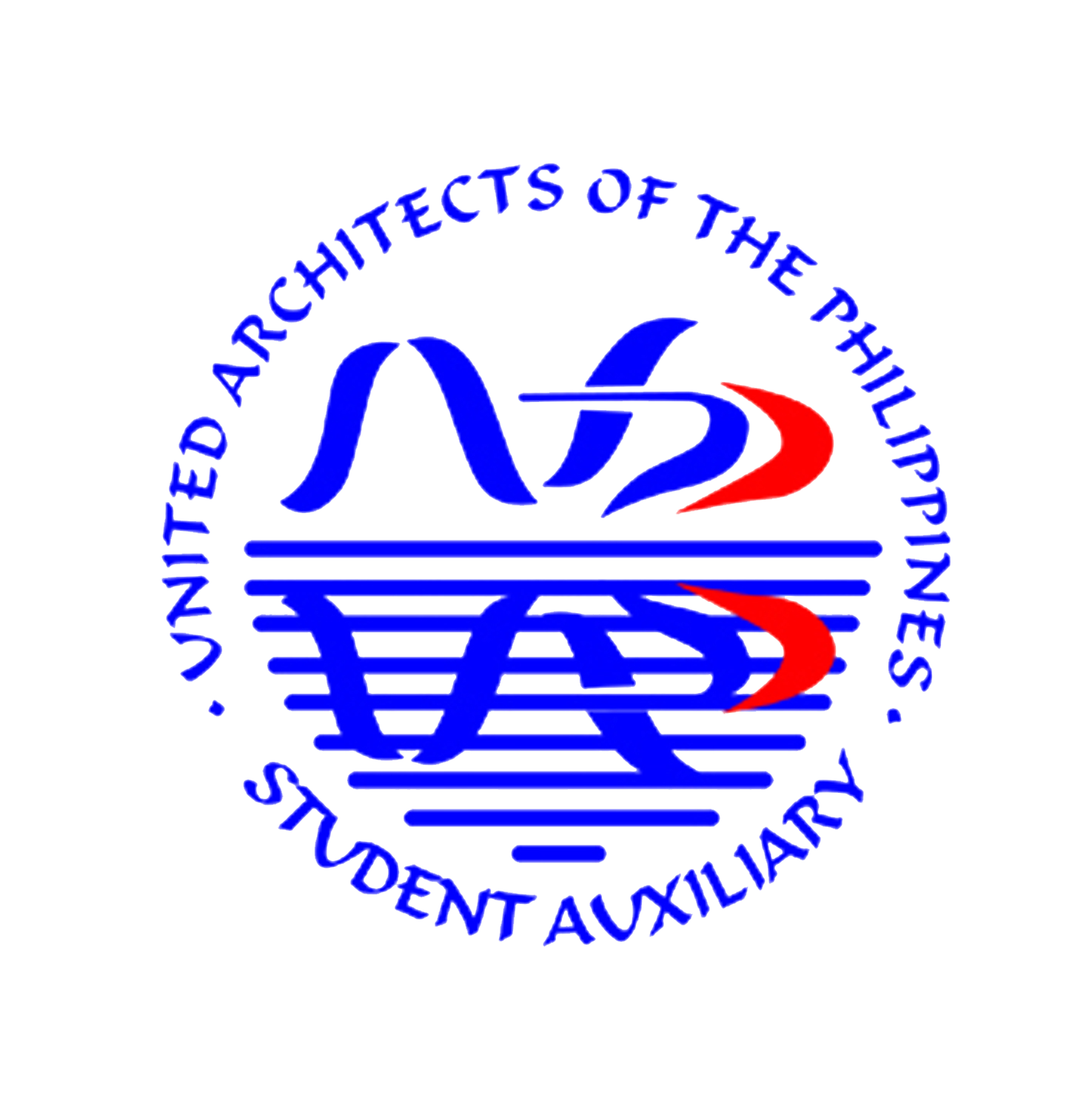
- Official Logo of UAPSA
- Abbreviation: UAPSA
- Purpose: Architectural organization
- Region served: Philippines
- Parent organization: United Architects of the Philippines
- Website: www.united-architects.org

The United Architects of the Philippines Student Auxiliary (UAPSA) is a student organization of the United Architects of the Philippines (UAP).

== History ==
UAPSA was established in 1989 as an arm and junior partner of United Architects of the Philippines. Jesus M. Reyes, then Vice Dean of the Central Colleges of the Philippines (CCP) College of Architecture and the 1989 President of UAP-Silangan Chapter, organized the first official UAPSA with 24 architecture students of CCP. Other schools that offers an architecture degree followed suit. Since then, UAPSA has been a duly-recognized student organization with 94 member schools and 16,000 members nationwide.

== Member schools ==
UAPSA Member Schools
Name	Location
Luzon
Mapúa Malayan Colleges Laguna	Cabuyao City, Province of Laguna, CALABARZON Region
National University Laguna	Calamba City, Province of Laguna, CALABARZON Region
Bicol University	Legazpi City, Province of Albay, Bicol Region
Ateneo de Naga University	City of Naga, Province of Camarines Sur, Bicol Region
University of Northeastern Philippines	City of Iriga, Province of Camarines Sur, Bicol Region
University of Saint Anthony	City of Iriga, Province of Camarines Sur, Bicol Region
Sorsogon State University	Sorsogon City, Province of Sorsogon, Bicol Region
Catanduanes State University	Municipality of Virac, Province of Catanduanes, Bicol Region
Bicol State College of Applied Sciences and Technology	City of Naga, Province of Camarines, Bicol Region
University of Nueva Caceres	City of Naga, Province of Camarines, Bicol Region
University of Batangas Lipa Campus	Lipa City, Province of Batangas, CALABARZON Region
Batangas State University	Batangas City, Province of Batangas, CALABARZON Region
University of Perpetual Help System DALTA - Calamba	Calamba City, Province of Laguna, CALABARZON Region
Manuel S. Enverga University Foundation	City of Lucena, Province of Quezon, CALABARZON Region
Polytechnic University of the Philippines Lopez	Municipality of Lopez, Province of Quezon, CALABARZON Region
De La Salle University – Dasmariñas	Dasmariñas City, Province of Cavite, CALABARZON Region
Occidental Mindoro State University	Municipality of San Jose, Province of Occidental Mindoro, MIMAROPA Region
Divine Word College of Calapan	City of Calapan, Province of Oriental Mindoro, MIMAROPA Region
Palawan State University	City of Puerto Princesa, Province of Palawan, MIMAROPA Region
Bulacan State University	Malolos City, Province of Bulacan, Central Luzon Region
Bataan Peninsula State University	City of Balanga, Province of Bataan, Central Luzon Region
Holy Angel University	Angeles City, Province of Pampanga, Central Luzon Region
Tarlac State University	Tarlac City, Province of Tarlac, Central Luzon Region
Saint Louis University	Baguio City, Province of Benguet, Cordillera Administrative Region
University of Baguio	Baguio City, Province of Benguet, Cordillera Administrative Region
University of the Cordilleras	Baguio City, Province of Benguet, Cordillera Administrative Region
Saint Mary's University	Bayombong, Nueva Vizcaya, Cagayan Valley Region
Isabela State University	Ilagan City, Isabela, Cagayan Valley Region
Visayas
Bohol Island State University	Tagbilaran City, Bohol
University of Bohol	Tagbilaran City, Bohol
Cebu Institute of Technology – University	Cebu City, Cebu
Eastern Visayas State University	Tacloban City, Leyte
Samar State University	Catbalogan City, Samar
Aklan State University	Bacan, Banga, Aklan
Capiz State University	Fuentes Drive, Roxas City, Capiz
Iloilo Science and Technology University	Burgos St., La Paz, Iloilo City, Iloilo
University of Antique	Sibalom, Antique
University of San Agustin	Gen. Luna Ave, Iloilo City Proper, Iloilo City
Mindanao
Mapúa Malayan Colleges Mindanao	Davao City, Province of Davao del Sur, Davao Region
Ateneo de Davao University	Davao City, Davao del Sur, Davao Region
Metro Manila
University of Santo Tomas	City of Manila, National Capital Region
Mapua University	City of Manila, National Capital Region
De La Salle–College of Saint Benilde	City of Manila, National Capital Region
National University - Manila	City of Manila, National Capital Region
University of the Philippines Diliman	Quezon City, National Capital Region
Adamson University	City of Manila, National Capital Region
Central Colleges of the Philippines	Quezon City, National Capital Region
Don Bosco Technical College	Mandaluyong City, National Capital Region
Eulogio "Amang" Rodriguez Institute of Science and Technology	City of Manila, National Capital Region
FEATI University	City of Manila, National Capital Region
Far Eastern University	City of Manila, National Capital Region
Manuel L. Quezon University	City of Manila National Capital Region
Pamantasan ng Lungsod ng Maynila	City of Manila, National Capital Region
Polytechnic University of the Philippines	City of Manila, National Capital Region
Rizal Technological University	Mandaluyong City, National Capital Region
Technological Institute of the Philippines	City of Manila, National Capital Region
Technological University of the Philippines	City of Manila, National Capital Region
University of the East	City of Manila, National Capital Region
University of the East Caloocan	Caloocan City, National Capital Region
