= Mercedes Raffiñan =

Philippine art historian and scholar

'Mercedes Raffiñan is a Philippine art historian and scholar. She was the first woman to be licensed as an architect in the history of Philippines architecture. Raffiñan is also the first woman to graduate with an architecture degree in the Philippines and Southeast Asia.

== Early life ==
She was born into a family of five siblings. She pursued her architectural education at Mapua University (formerly known as the Mapua Institute of Technology) in the Philippines.

== Career ==
In 1934, Raffiñan was one of the two examinees who passed the Architects' Board of Examinations. Raffiñan is an expert on the history of art and society in the Philippines. She has written Art and Visuality in the Early Spanish Philippines, 1521-1800 and Looking at Renaissance through Philippine Eyes. She became the first licensed woman architect in the Philippines receiving license number 45.
