= Asep =

- Asep given name in Standard Sundanese script
- Pronunciation: Asép (Sundanese Alphabet); Asep (Indonesian Alphabet)
- Gender: Masculine
- Language: Sundanese, Badui, Indonesian

Origin
- Language: Old Sundanese
- Meaning: Handsome
- Region of origin: Southeast Asia

Other names
- Variant forms: Aép, Cécép, Encép
- Nickname: Sép

Asép (Sundanese: ᮃᮞᮦᮕ᮪, romanized: Asép, Sundanese pronunciation: [asɛp], romanized as Asep in Indonesian Spelling System) is a male Sundanese or Badui given name. It is derived from the Sundanese root word Kasép (ᮊᮞᮦᮕ᮪), meaning handsome. Other forms of this name are Encép (ᮈᮔ᮪ᮎᮦᮕ᮪), Cécép (ᮎᮦᮎᮦᮕ᮪), and Aép (ᮃᮆᮕ᮪).

== Possible meanings ==
The meaning of the name Asep depends on the language used.

- In Sundanese, Asep derived from Kasép, means "handsome".
- In Sanskrit, Asep means "scented incense".
- In Indonesian, Asep means “spiritual, mystical, or belief in spirits”.

The three meanings, whether related or not, share a common association with positive qualities. Kasép (“handsome”) conveys the hope that a person named Asep will possess both physical attractiveness and good character, while the reference to fragrant incense symbolizes the expectation that he will spread positivity and goodwill within his surroundings.

== Notable people with this name ==
- Asep Sunandar Sunarya, a Sundanese wayang golék dalang
- Asep Kambali, an Indonesian historian specializing in the history of Indonesia during the colonial period
- Asep Budi, an Indonesian footballer
