= Association of Structural Engineers of the Philippines =

- Abbreviation: ASEP
- Formation: September 30, 1961; 65 years ago
- Legal status: Active
- Headquarters: Unit 713, 7th Floor, Future Point Plaza Condominium 112 Panay Avenue, Quezon City, Philippines
- Region served: International
- Fields: Structural engineering
- President: Dr. Rodolfo P. Mendoza Jr.
- Immediate Past President: Dr.Lessandro E. O. Garciano
- Affiliations: Professional Regulation Commission
- Website: aseponline.org

The Association of Structural Engineers of the Philippines, Inc. abbreviated as ASEP is an organization of structural engineers of the Philippines affiliated with the Philippine Institute of Civil Engineers.

== Background ==
ASEP was established in 1961 to promote the advancement of Filipino civil engineers in the field of structural engineering. The publication of the National Structural Code of the Philippines (NSCP) and the referral codes of the Philippine National Building Code were published by the organization.

== Advocacy ==
ASEP exists in the advancement of structural engineering in the Philippines as well as upholding ethical values in the promotion of national and international professional collaboration with governments, industry and the academe.

The organization specifically lobbies on legislation of the Philippines in the national and local levels.

== Notable publications ==
- National Structural Code of the Philippines
- National Building Code of the Philippines
- ASEP Steel Handbook
