= Professional Regulatory Board of Architecture =

The Professional Regulatory Board of Architecture (PRBoA) was a board that regulates architecture in the Philippines. It existed from November 3, 2006, to November 23, 2012, and had three members.

== Formation ==
The 2006 - 2012 Professional Regulatory Board of Architecture (PRBArch), which started with its first member on November 3, 2006, was fully reconstituted as of March 30, 2007, in full compliance with Republic Act No. 9266 (The Architecture Act of 2004). It served over the period November 16, 2006, through November 23, 2012, i.e. one (1) year and seven (7) calendar days (which ended with the appointment and swearing in of the new PRBArch Chairman, appointed to head the 2nd reconstituted PRBoA).

== Structure ==
The PRBoA is one of 46 Professional Regulatory Boards (PRBs) under the Professional Regulation Commission (PRC) of the Republic of the Philippines and served as the primary spokes-entity for the nine (9) Professional Regulatory Boards ("PRBs") making up the Philippine (PH) Technology (i.e. Non-Engineering) Professions i.e. the built and natural environment (BNE) professions of agriculture, architecture, chemistry, environmental planning, forestry, interior design, landscape architecture and master plumbing. The State-regulated professions of architecture, environmental planning, interior design, landscape architecture and master plumbing are also collectively considered as the PH environmental design professions.

The PRBoA as an entity is under the administrative control and supervision of the PRC, a quasi-judicial and quasi-legislative entity that forms part of the executive branch of the Philippine Government. As such, it does not act independently on matters involving the regulation of the practice of the profession of architecture in the Philippines. The reconstituted PRBoA (of 2006–12) was a collegial body and was proactive in the areas of executive action relating to the implementation and enforcement of Republic Act No. 9266 (otherwise known as the Philippine "Architecture Act of 2004"), its implementing rules and regulations (IRR) and derivative regulations e.g. other executive issuances promulgated by the PRBoA and approved for official publication/dissemination by the PRC.

== Members ==
As of July 21, 2025, the reconstituted PRBArch was composed of three (3) privately practicing PH architects:

- Chairman - Arch. Robert Medina Mirafuente;
- Senior Member - Arch.Conrado Tablan Onglao;
- Junior Member - Arch. Corazon Tandoc.

The PRBArch Members served in a holdover capacity, until their respective replacements were appointed by the President of the Republic of the Philippines (PH).

== Purposes ==
=== Regulating architects ===
As of November 23, 2012, the 2006-2012 reconstituted PRBArch regulated the practice of about 30,000 PH-registered architects (RAs) nationwide/overseas i.e. natural (not juridical) persons. Of this number of RAs, it is conservatively estimated that less than half (approx. 14,000) at the time had valid licenses to practice i.e. a Registered and Licensed Architect (RLA) and that up to 50.0% of said RLAs may already working outside the country. The PRBoA also regulates the practice of foreign architects (FA) i.e. only as natural (not as juridical) persons, wishing to engage in the professional practice of architecture for any building project on PH soil for a limited period of time and of architectural firms (sole/single proprietorships, partnerships, corporations, associations and joint ventures). Only individual foreign architects/FAs (not foreign architectural firms/FAFs) are allowed to practice architecture in the PH together with counterpart Filipino RLAs and only if they are issued a special/temporary permit (STP) in full accordance with R.A. No. 9266. The PRBoA supports the Asia-Pacific Economic Cooperation (APEC) Architects Register and the Association of Southeast Asian Nations/ ASEAN Mutual Recognition Arrangement (MRA) and its ASEAN Architects' Council (AAC) for borderless architectural practice/s, as qualified under the protocols/agreements and as qualified by valid and subsisting laws on architectural practice in the Philippines, including the World Trade Organization General Agreement on Trade in Services (WTO-GATS) signed by the PH Government in 1994, and having taken effect in January 2020.

=== Licensure Examination for Architects (LEA) ===
The PRBArch also administers the Licensure Examination for Architects (LEA), then given twice in Manila annually by the Philippine Government and of Foreign LEAs (FLEAs), then given as part of the now annual PRC Special Professional Licensure Board Examinations (SPLBEs) in such countries as Saudi Arabia (KSA), Qatar, Dubai and the United Arab Emirates (UAE), Hong Kong and Singapore for expatriate Filipinos (overseas Filipino workers or "OFWs"). Over the years 2006–12, the LEA mortality rate ranged from 49.0% to 68% per examination. Over the past 57 years (ending 2012) of the regulation of Philippine architectural practice, only an average of about 400 RAs were granted certificates and licenses to practice annually. With the elimination of manual drafting in the LEA subject of Architectural Design and Site Planning (ADSP) starting in late 2009 and with other LEA/FLEA-related reforms, the LEA/FLEA passing rates have more or less stabilized at 50 - 52% (as of end-2012).

=== Executive concerns ===
Among the executive concerns that were proactively addressed by the 2006 - 2012 reconstituted PRBArch were: 1) general information dissemination concerning the laws/regulations on architectural practice, 2) enforcement mechanisms against illegal practitioners (non-RAs and non-RLAs) and 3) the completion of the amendments to the 1979 Standards of Professional Practice/SPP (otherwise known as the Architect's National Code/ANC) in 2010. Among the quasi-judicial responsibilities that were discharged by the PRBoA included the hearing of (and the promulgation of decisions) on administrative cases filed against RAs or RLAs and the review of cases against illegal practitioners for endorsement to prosecutors and Philippine courts.

=== R.A. No. 9266 ===
The practice of architecture in the Philippines (PH) is only a professional privilege that is granted to individuals and firms (natural and juridical persons), duly registered and licensed in accordance with PH law i.e. limited only to RLAs and registered architectural firms (RAFs). It was never a right accorded to RAs nor to any other State-regulated and licensed professional (RLP), specifically certain PH civil engineers (CEs) and their organizations who/which insist that they too can exercise the same professional privileges as RLAs. In the case of RLAs, such an exclusive professional privilege can be suspended or revoked by the PRBArch for cause/s provided under law and only in accordance with due process.

The preparation, signing and sealing of architectural plans and documents are only for RLAs and not for any other RLP or other unqualified entities under PH law (specifically PH civil engineers and other unregistered persons as defined by law, specifically by R.A. No. 9266). As such, the 2006 - 2012 reconstituted PRBArch has actively campaigned since early 2007 for the full implementation and enforcement of the pertinent provisions under R.A. No. 9266, which all limit the preparation, signing and sealing of architectural plans and documents only to RLAs and which mandate all officials of the PH national and local governments to fully implement and enforce the said provisions. This means that even RAs who have not updated their licenses to practice architecture are prohibited from practicing until such time that they are able to renew such the requirements for lawful practice on PH soil (in the form of renewable professional identification/ID cards or PICs).

Among the legal steps taken by the PRBoA to fully implement and enforce R.A. No. 9266 included the filing of graft charges against national and local government officials who refused to lawfully implement and enforce R.A. No. 9266 and the harmonized provisions of the 2004 Revised Implementing Rules and Regulations (IRR) of P.D. No. 1096 (the 1977 National Building Code of the Philippines/NBCP). Also impleaded in the said suits were private individuals who willfully resisted or violated the said laws.

Among the legislative initiatives of the 2006 - 2012 reconstituted PRBoA were participation in collaborative efforts to repeal the 1977 National Building Code of the Philippines (NBCP or Presidential Decree No. 1096), the proposed repeal of the 2000 Architecture Code of the PH (ACP), the amendment of portions of PH anti-graft laws, the review of bills that tended to undermine lawful professional architectural practice on PH soil, the professionalization of the Local Government Unit (LGU)-appointive position of Local Building Official (LBO) and Assistant Local Building Official (ALBO), bills on non-mobile billboards (NMBs), consulting service regulation (CSR) in the PH, and various other related concerns.
