= Roberto Bernardo =

Filipino civil engineer and government official

Roberto R. Bernardo
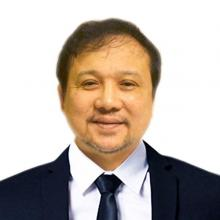
- Official portrait, 2016

Undersecretary of Department of Public Works and Highways for Regional Operations in Visayas, NCR, and Region IV-B
- Incumbent
- Assumed office August 2016

Personal details
- Born: August 7, 1963 (age 63) Malolos, Bulacan, Philippines
- Education: Mapúa Institute of Technology (BS); Saint Francis of Assisi College
- Occupation: Civil engineer, government official
- Awards: Most Outstanding Alumnus Award for Government Service (Mapúa Institute of Technology, 2009)

Roberto R. Bernardo (born August 7, 1963) is a Filipino civil engineer and government official currently serving as Undersecretary for Regional Operations in Visayas, the National Capital Region (NCR), and Region IV-B under the Department of Public Works and Highways (DPWH).

== Early life and education ==
Bernardo was born in Malolos, Bulacan, on August 7, 1963. He earned his Bachelor of Science in Civil Engineering from the Mapúa Institute of Technology in 1984.

== Career ==
Bernardo began his career in 1986 as a Civil Engineering Aide at the DPWH, later moving up into numerous positions. In 2013, Manila Mayor Joseph Estrada appointed him as OIC-City Engineer on secondment status.

He was appointed Assistant Secretary of the DPWH in August 2016 and later became Undersecretary for Regional Operations in Visayas, NCR, and Region IV-B. He holds the rank of Career Executive Service Officer (CESO) IV.

As undersecretary, he has supervision and control over DPWH regional offices in Visayas, NCR, and Region IV-B, including oversight of infrastructure projects funded by various line agencies, such as school buildings, health centers, and farm-to-market roads.

== Controversy ==
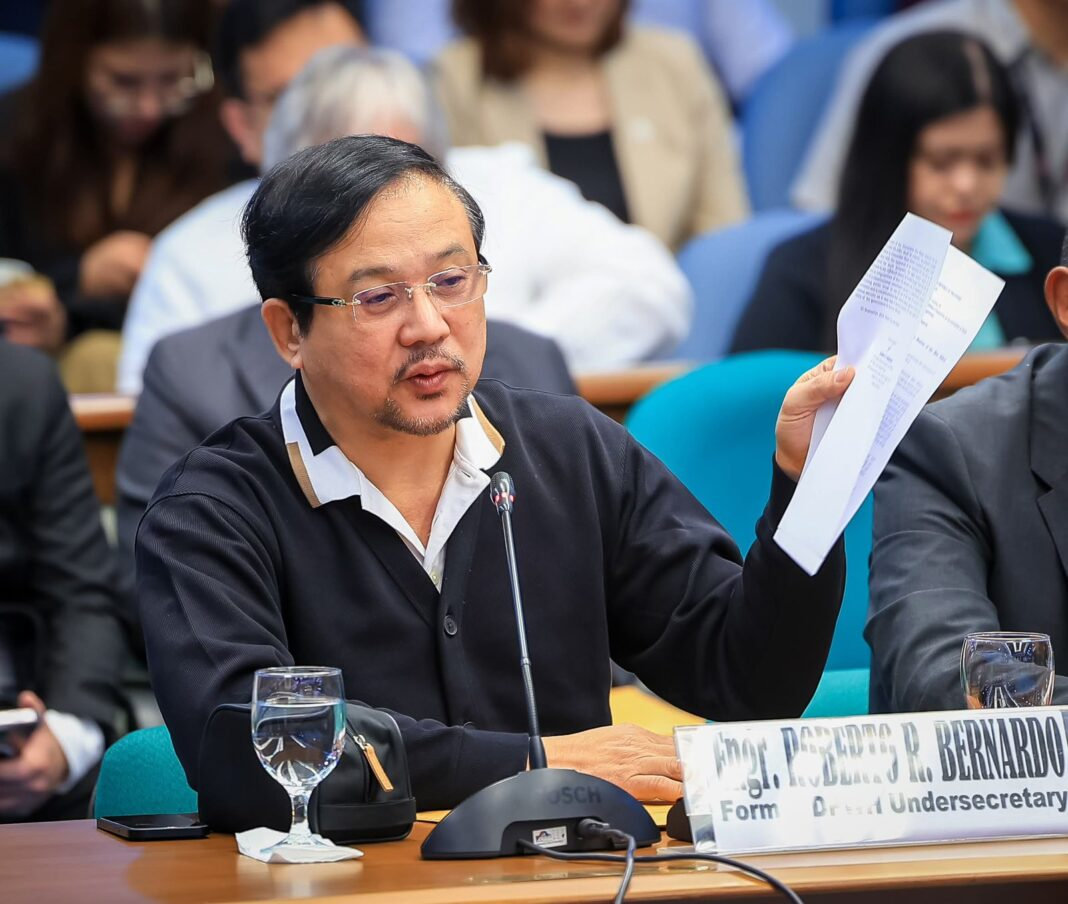
Bernardo testifying during senate hearing about flood control scandal on September 25, 2025.

In August 2025, allegations circulated on social media linking Bernardo to corruption and claimed he had been dismissed from government service. He denied the allgegations, describing them as "malicious and completely false" and asserted that he had no pending administrative case. A certification issued by the DPWH Legal Service confirmed that Bernardo had no administrative charges filed against him.

Bernardo later clarified that he was on approved medical leave from July 28 to October 27, 2025, to undergo treatment for a spinal condition. DPWH Secretary Manuel Bonoan confirmed that no disciplinary case had been filed against Bernardo and reaffirmed the department’s commitment to professionalism and transparency.

On April 27, 2026, reports indicated Bernardo was to return 1B pesos taken from the Department of Public Works projects, as part of being accepted to the witness protection program.

== International engagements ==
Bernardo has attended multiple international conferences, including:

- Seminar on Engineering and Construction Standard System and Application for Developing Countries, Beijing, China (2011)
- ASCE 139th Annual Conference, Kansas City, Missouri, United States (2009)
- Consultative Meeting with the Office of the Secretary for Works, Hong Kong (2008)

== Affiliations ==
He is an active member of the Philippine Institute of Civil Engineers (PICE) and the Road Engineering Association of the Philippines (REAP).
