= Cabral files =

Series of documents from Cathy Cabral

Cabral Files
- Part of Flood control projects scandal in the Philippines
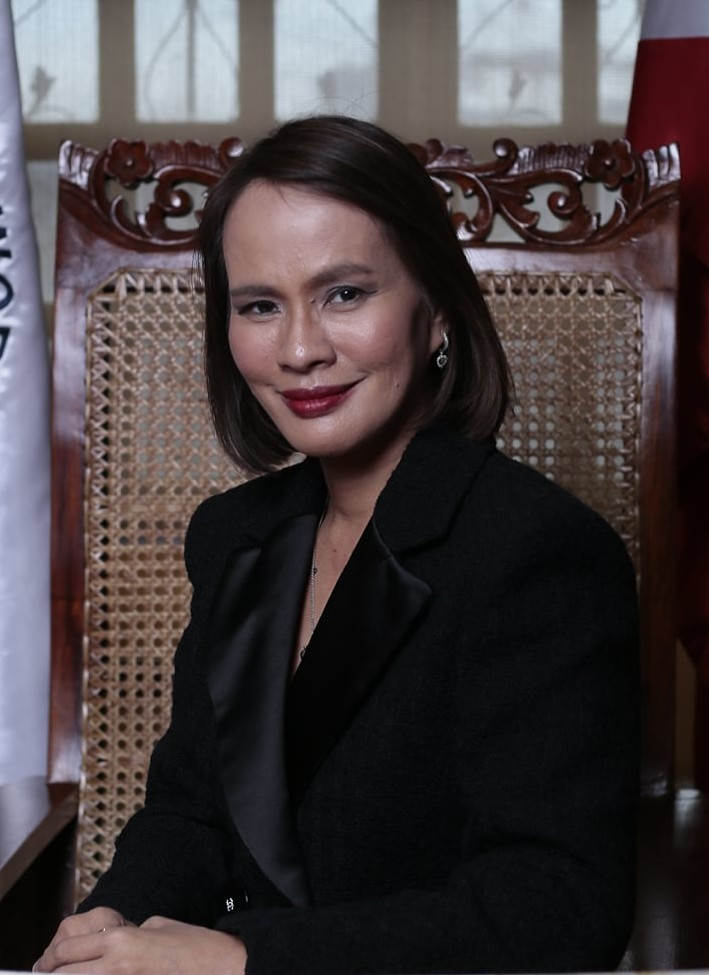
- Cabral in 2021
- Date: December 2025 (release)
- Location: Philippines
- Cause: Release of documents regarding DPWH budget allocations
- Participants: Leandro Leviste, Department of Public Works and Highways (DPWH), Office of the Ombudsman
- Outcome: Investigation ongoing

The Cabral Files are a set of documents released in late 2025 that allegedly show budget data from the Department of Public Works and Highways (DPWH). These files list projects and funds assigned to different legislative districts between 2023 and 2026. Batangas Representative Leandro Leviste made the documents public on December 24, 2025, claiming he received them from former DPWH Undersecretary Maria Catalina "Cathy" Cabral before she died. The authenticity of the files and the method of their acquisition are subjects of dispute between Leviste, the DPWH, and the Office of the Ombudsman.

== Background ==
Maria Catalina Cabral served as the Undersecretary for Planning and Public-Private Partnerships at the DPWH. She was a key official involved in the preparation of the agency's National Expenditure Program (NEP). In late 2025, the government launched an investigation into alleged corruption regarding flood control projects. Cabral was implicated in these inquiries prior to her death. On December 18, 2025, Cabral was found unconscious in a ravine along Kennon Road in Tuba, Benguet, and was declared dead shortly after.

Police forensic analysis indicated that Cabral likely slid down the ravine rather than being pushed or jumping. The forensic report stated that her injuries were likely caused by a fall. Tests also found citalopram, an antidepressant, in her body. No suicide note was recovered at the scene of the incident. Jonvic Remulla, the Interior Secretary, stated that CCTV footage showed Cabral was alone with her driver at a hotel before the incident and did not meet with any contractors. The location where her body was found is near a rock-netting project that was also under investigation for overpricing.

== Contents of the files ==
Representative Leviste began releasing the documents on social media on December 24, 2025. He stated the files contain a list of "allocable" funds, which are amounts that district congressmen can earmark for local projects. The documents indicate that for the 2025 budget, the total "allocable" amount for district representatives was ₱401.3 billion. Leviste claimed the total budget with "outside allocables" reached ₱1.041 trillion.

The files allegedly list specific budget amounts for various legislative districts. The documents showed ₱19.1 billion allocated for the first district of Leyte, represented by Speaker Martin Romualdez. They also listed ₱12.9 billion for the first district of Ilocos Norte, represented by Sandro Marcos. Other large allocations included ₱20.99 billion for the lone district of Occidental Mindoro and ₱16.7 billion for the third district of Bulacan. Leviste provided summaries for budget years 2023 through 2026 to show the distribution of funds.

According to Senator Panfilo Lacson, the documents also listed "allocables" for members of the executive branch. Lacson stated that at least five Cabinet secretaries were listed with billions in funds. One entry allegedly showed "ES" (Executive Secretary) with an allocation of ₱8.3 billion. Former DPWH Secretary Manuel Bonoan was allegedly listed with over ₱30 billion in allocables. Leviste also claimed the documents listed deceased congressmen, such as Edward Hagedorn and Marisol Panotes, as proponents. Leviste clarified that the people listed were representatives of the districts but are not necessarily the proponents who inserted the projects.

== Controversy over acquisition ==
There are conflicting accounts regarding how Representative Leviste obtained the files. Leviste claimed that Cabral gave him the files voluntarily on September 4, 2025. He stated that DPWH Secretary Vince Dizon authorized the release in the interest of transparency. Leviste released email correspondence from October 2025 to support his claim that he requested the data formally.

However, DPWH staff members alleged that Leviste forcibly took the documents from Cabral's office. Witnesses claimed Leviste entered Cabral's office and demanded the list of proponents. A staff member stated they heard a "loud thud" from inside the office. Witnesses alleged that Leviste used his phone to video the documents while Cabral pleaded with him. One employee claimed Cabral suffered a "paper cut" on her hand during a struggle for the documents. Secretary Dizon denied giving authorization and stated that Leviste forced a staff member to save files from a computer onto a flash drive. Dizon described the incident as Leviste "throwing his weight around" and using intimidation.

CCTV footage from September 4 showed Leviste and Cabral walking together, with Leviste holding papers. Leviste denied any physical struggle or illegal taking of files. He argued that the DPWH raising these allegations months later was suspicious.

== Investigation and authenticity ==
The Office of the Ombudsman is investigating the content and the source of the files. Following a subpoena, the DPWH surrendered Cabral's computer and files to the Ombudsman on December 23, 2025. Assistant Ombudsman Mico Clavano stated that they will conduct a digital forensic examination of the original equipment. This examination will be coordinated with the Commission on Audit and the Philippine National Police Anti-Cybercrime Group.

Clavano stated that soft copies held by third parties, like Leviste, lose evidentiary value because they are susceptible to manipulation. Clavano also claimed that Leviste only showed "limited portions" of the files to investigators during a meeting in November. Leviste disputed this, asserting he showed the full summary and Excel spreadsheets. He claimed the investigators were more interested in building a case against Congressman Edwin Gardiola.

Malacañang, through Press Official Claire Castro, questioned the authenticity of the files. Castro stated that unless the DPWH authenticates the documents, they are considered "hearsay" and have no probative value. Secretary Dizon stated he has not authenticated the files in Leviste's possession because he has not seen them. Leviste urged the DPWH to simply release their own copies to the public to verify the data. The Ombudsman also noted that multiple other sources have approached them claiming to have copies of the files.

== Reactions ==
Former Executive Secretary Lucas Bersamin expressed outrage at being linked to the files. He denied authorizing any DPWH budget allocations and called for a thorough investigation. Senator Lacson stated he wanted to meet with Leviste to discuss the files but schedules did not align. Lacson noted that the documents raised questions about why executive officials had "allocables."

Representative Terry Ridon of the Bicol Saro party-list warned that Leviste could face an ethics complaint. Ridon argued that obtaining government records without official authority is a serious matter that must be investigated. Leviste accused Ridon of having budget insertions as well, which Ridon denied. Ridon claimed Leviste's allegations were "squid tactics" to divert attention from the acquisition of the files.

The group "Digital Pinoys" called for an investigation into the alleged illegal access of the files. They claimed that working around safety rules weakens both the data and public trust. Conversely, the group "Tama Na" urged Leviste to release all the files in his possession to help catch corrupt officials. The group emphasized that the public deserves to know the whole truth regardless of how it reaches the Senate or Congress.

Leviste also alleged that the Bases Conversion and Development Authority (BCDA) had flood control projects during Vince Dizon's tenure. He linked a subcontractor to the family of Representative Edwin Gardiola. Dizon and the BCDA categorically denied these allegations, stating the BCDA has no discretionary funds. The BCDA asserted their projects are governed by strict procurement laws and COA rules.

Malacañang Press Official Claire Castro stated that an investigation should determine how the files were sourced, noting that evidence obtained illegally loses its value in court. She emphasized that the burden of proof is on Leviste to authenticate his documents. Leviste responded that the public can verify his claims through the data itself. Palace officials warned that Leviste should not shift the responsibility of authentication to others. Malacañang also wanted to know if the files truly came from Cabral or from a staff member. Leviste maintained that he has not shared the files with anyone other than the Ombudsman and the ICI.

The DPWH questioned the timing of Leviste's allegations. DPWH officials noted the staff reports of Leviste's behavior surfaced after he began releasing the files. Leviste called on the DPWH to authenticate the files within a few days to prove they are not hiding anything. He stated that if the DPWH does not release the files, it suggests a cover-up. The Ombudsman emphasized that insertions are not automatically illegal unless fraud is proven.
