= BTTC Centre =

- Interactive map of the BTTC Centre area

General information
- Location: Ortigas Avenue corner Roosevelt Avenue, Greenhills, San Juan, Metro Manila, Philippines
- Coordinates: 14°36′13″N 121°02′42″E

Technical details
- Floor count: 12
- Floor area: 1,384 square meters (14,900 sq ft)

Design and construction
- Developer: Hantex Corporation

BTTC Centre is a Class A 12-story green building located at Ortigas Avenue corner Roosevelt Avenue, Greenhills, San Juan, Metro Manila, Philippines. It is the first green building in Greenhills, San Juan to receive a Gold pre-certification for Core & Shell under LEED. Developed by Hantex Corporation, it is an office, commercial and retail type of property with a floor plate of 1,384 square meters per floor. BTTC Centre is also among the 58 projects currently registered for LEED certification, together with the Zuellig Building in Makati and Megaworld 8 Campus Building and Wells Fargo Headquarters, which are both in Bonifacio Global City. It is also an IT-Center PEZA Certified Building.

== Design and features ==
BTTC Centre is managed by real estate services firm CBRE Philippines. Completed in December 2012, this building has maintenance systems and recycles water with its built-in sewerage treatment plant, installed with double-glazed glass to provide abundant entry of light and also cut approximately around 70% of the heat from outside, keeping the building cool at all times.

The BTTC Centre was designed by ADGo Architecture and Design, Inc. headed by its principal architect, Architect Daniel Go.

== See also ==
- San Juan
