= Alfredo Yao =

Filipino businessman

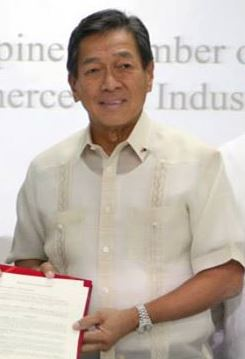
- Born: November 26, 1943 (age 82)
- Occupation: Businessman
- Known for: Chairman Emeritus of Philippine Business Bank; Chairman of Zest-O Corporation; Chairman of Macay Holdings

Alfredo M. Yao (born November 26, 1943) is a Filipino businessman who is the founder of Zest-O, Macay Holdings, Inc. (PSE: MACAY) and Philippine Business Bank (PSE: PBB). He served as the Special Envoy to China for Tourism and Cooperation in 2009.

== Early life ==
Yao was born on 26 November 1943. After losing his father at age 12, Yao began working to support his family since his mother's earnings as a sidewalk vendor could not support their needs. He attended the Mapua Institute of Technology but later dropped out due to financial problems.

== Companies ==
- Zest-O Corporation
- Mazy's Capital, Inc.
  - Macay Holdings, Inc. (PSE: MACAY)
    - ARC Refreshments Corporation
    - ARC Holdings, Inc.
- Philippine Business Bank (PSE: PBB)

== Sources ==
- Investing businessweek
- People Info: Alfredo Yao
- Zesto Corporation official website
- UACT official website
- Zest-O ties up with Indon firm
