= Asep Kambali =

Indonesian historian

- Born: July 16, 1980 (age 46); Cianjur, Indonesia
- Citizenship: Indonesia
- Education: Jakarta State University; Paramadina University
- Awards: Indonesia Achievement Award 2008
- Scientific career
- Fields: Indonesia History; History of Colonial Era; History of the Dutch East India Company (VOC)
- Workplaces: Indonesia Historia Community

Asep Kambali (July 16, 1980) from Cianjur is an Indonesian historian who is concerned with the field of Indonesia History of Colonial Era. Asep is known as a "traveling history teacher", an activist in preserving history and culture, also as a founder of Komunitas Historia Indonesia (Indonesia Historia Community). According to him, his and his community's goal is to remind younger generations in Indonesia to love their country through understanding of Indonesia's traces of history and culture.

Asep is known to be highly dedicated in his field. Asep stated in the past that "A great nation is the one that can appreciate its history. The reason why this nation is never great is because we refuse to appreciate history”

Asep also co-founded Paguyuban Asep Dunia (World Asep Community). A community of people named Asep.

== Awards ==
- Indonesia Achievement Award (Indonesia Berprestasi Award) organized by XL Axiata, 2008.
