= Macay Holdings =

Philippine company

Macay Holdings, Inc.
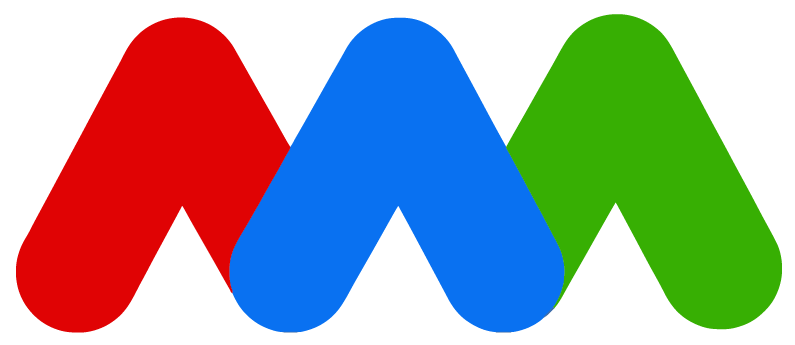
- Company type: Public
- Traded as: PSE: MACAY
- Founded: 2014 (as Macay Holdings, Inc.)
- Headquarters: San Antonio Village, Makati, Metro Manila
- Area served: Philippines
- Key people: Alfredo M. Yao (Chairman); Antonio I. Panajon (President); Fernando R. Balatbat (Treasurer)
- Products: Soft drink
- Parent: Mazy’s Capital, Inc.
- Subsidiaries: ARC Refreshments Corporation; ARC Holdings, Inc.
- Website: www.macayholdings.com.ph

Macay Holdings, Inc. (PSE: MACAY) is a company based in the Philippines engaged in the bottling and distribution of RC Cola and other soft drink beverages in the Philippines.

== History ==
Macay Holdings, Inc. (Macay) was incorporated on October 16, 1930, as Maybank ATR Kim Eng Financial Corporation (MAKE), an investment holding company focused primarily on financial services.

On September 24, 2013, MAKE shareholder Maybank Kim Eng Holdings, Ltd. entered into a share purchase agreement with Mazy's Capital, Inc. (owned by the group of Alfredo Yao), wherein the latter purchased equivalent 89.75% of the outstanding shares of MAKE.

On December 3, 2013, ARC Refreshments Corporation (ARC) was incorporated as a wholly owned subsidiary. ARC was established to consolidate the bottling, distribution, marketing and sales of RC Cola, Fruit Soda Orange, Juicy Lemon and Arcy's Rootbeer, all of which were held by Asiawide Refreshments Corporation (Asiawide) and Mega Asia Bottling Corporation (Mega Asia) since 2002.

Trading on MAKE was suspended by the PSE on January 2, 2014, pending submission of a comprehensive disclosure on the transaction. The PSE said this was covered by the rules on the backdoor listing. ARC acquired all of the bottling machinery and equipment of Mega Asia and the machinery, equipment, bottles and shells, inventory and other assets and certain liabilities of Asiawide. The suspension on the trading of MAKE shares was lifted on January 21, 2014, and trading was resumed the following day.

The Securities and Exchange Commission approved the company's change in corporate name to Macay Holdings, Inc. on January 30, 2014.

In 2014, Macay also acquired ARC Holdings, Inc. (AHI), holder of the trademark licenses of RC Cola in the Philippines. The group also obtained the master franchise of RC Cola for the ASEAN region.

In August 2020, Macay acquired Artemisplus Express Inc., which operates under the trade name Kitchen City.

In a September 6, 2022 disclosure to the PSE, Macay announced it will acquire 100% of RC Global Beverages Inc. which controls the international (non-US) rights to RC Cola for US$46 million, and was completed in January 2023.

== Brands ==
- RC Cola
- RC Cola Zero Sugar
- Fruit Soda Orange
- Juicy Lemon
- Arcy's Rootbeer
- Seetrus
- Rite 'n Lite
- Extra Joss Maxx Energy Drink

== See also ==
- RC Cola Raiders
