= United Architects of the Philippines =

Professional organization for architects in the Philippines

- Abbreviation: UAP, IAPOA
- Formation: May 12, 1975; 51 years ago
- Type: Professional Organization
- Legal status: Active
- Purpose: Architectural organization
- Headquarters: 53 Sct. Rallos St, Diliman, Quezon City, 1103 Metro Manila, Philippines
- Region served: Philippines
- Members: 58,000 (2024)
- National President: Ar. Jonathan V. Manalad, fuap, PhD
- National Executive Vice President: Ar. Chona E. Ponce, fuap, PhD
- Secretary General: Ar. Rex Chua Tak, uap
- Immediate Past National President: Ar. Donato B. Magcale, fuap
- Website: www.united-architects.org

The United Architects of the Philippines (UAP) or the Integrated and Accredited Professional Organization of Architects (IAPOA), is the professional organization for architects in the Philippines. UAP offers education, government advocacy, community redevelopment, and public outreach to support the architecture profession in the country and improve its public image. Its headquarters is located in Quezon City.

== History ==
The United Architects of the Philippines was formed through the merger of three architectural organization in the Philippines in 1975. These were the League of Philippine Architects (LPA), the Association of Philippine Government Architects (APGA), and the Philippine Institute of Architects (PIA). Upon its registration on May 19, 1975, it became the first duly-accredited professional organization in the country. After the passage of Republic Act 9266, or the Architecture Act of 2004, UAP applied as the Integrated and Accredited Professional Organization of Architects (IAPOA) to the Professional Regulation Commission on May 19, 2014

=== List of UAP National Presidents ===
Since its establishment in 1975, the United Architects of the Philippines (UAP) has been led by a succession of National Presidents who have each contributed to the advancement of the architectural profession in the country.

Below is a chronological list of individuals who have served as UAP National President:

- 1975 : Norberto Nuke
- 1976 : Jose Herrera
- 1977 - 1978 : Ruperto Gaite
- 1979 - 1980 : Felipe Mendoza
- 1981 : Otillo Arellano
- 1981 - 1982 : Leandro Locsin
- 1983 - 1984 : Manuel Manosa
- 1985 - 1986 : Cesar Canchela
- 1987 - 1988 : Froilan Hong
- 1989 : Angel Lazaro, Jr.
- 1990 - 1991 : Richeto Alcordo
- 1992 - 1994 : Jaime Marquez
- 1994 - 1996 : Nestor Mangio
- 1996 - 1998 : Emmanuel Cuntapay
- 1998 - 2000 : Yolanda David-Reyes
- 2000 - 2002 : Prosperidad Luis
- 2002 - 2004 : Robert Sac
- 2004 - 2005 : Enrique Olonan
- 2005 - 2007 : Edric Marco Florentino
- 2007 - 2009 : Medeliano Roldan, Jr.
- 2009 - 2010 : Ana Mangalino-Ling
- 2010 - 2012 : Ramon Mendoza
- 2010 - 2014 : Rozanno Rosal
- 2014 - 2016 : Maria Benita Ochoa-Regala
- 2016 - 2018 : Guillermo Hisancha
- 2018 - 2020 : Benjamin Panganiban, Jr.
- 2020 - 2021 : Renato Heray
- 2021 - 2022 : Armando Eugene De Guzman III
- 2022 - 2024 : Richard Garcia
- 2024 - 2025 : Donato Magcale
- 2025 - present: Jonathan Manalad

== Auxiliary Organizations ==
The United Architects of the Philippines is supported by two officially recognized auxiliary organizations that represent architecture students and recent graduates. These groups serve as training grounds for future professionals and extend the reach of UAP’s mission across academic and early professional sectors.

=== United Architects of the Philippines Graduate Auxiliary ===
The United Architects of the Philippines Graduate Auxiliary (UAPGA) is the duly recognized graduate arm of the United Architects of the Philippines (UAP). The organization has 48 chapters and an estimate of 4,000 members as of 2023.

=== United Architects of the Philippines Student Auxiliary ===
The United Architects of the Philippines Student Auxiliary (UAPSA) was established in 1989 as the junior partner of UAP. It is the official student organization of UAP and has 94 member schools with over 16,000 members.

== Series of Conflict between architects and civil engineers in the Philippines ==
=== Historical Background ===
At the end of World War II in 1945, there were approximately 300 architects and 1,800 civil engineers in the Philippines who were tasked to help rebuild the war-ravaged country. Both professions practiced under one law before June 1950, when Congress passed two laws which distinguished the works of the civil engineers from the architects. Further amendments were made in 1956 to further distinguish the two professions. From 1950s-1970s, civil engineers who desired to practice architecture in the country must take up an architecture degree and pass the licensure examination for architects.

=== 1970s: Early Legal Ambiguity in the National Building Code ===
In February 1977, President Ferdinand Marcos signed into law PD 1096, the National Building Code of the Philippines; there was nothing stated in Section 302 of the said law about signing architectural documents or which state-regulated professional shall sign and seal such documents. However, in some versions of the implementing rules and regulations of PD 1096, Section 302 appeared to state that civil engineers can sign and seal architectural documents, which is an act of illegal intercalation of or insertion into the text of Section 302. The United Architects of the Philippines, along with a House of Representative member who is also an architect, Ruperto C. Gaite, led a massive campaign to fully disseminate public information on the practice of architecture in the Philippines.

=== 2000s-2010s: RA9266 and Legal Challenges ===
In 2003, UAP entered an agreement with the Philippine Institute of Civil Engineers (PICE) to support each other's legislative initiative and to finally fully segregate the two practices of architects and civil engineers. The architects were to give up structural design while the civil engineers will give up architectural design.

In 2004, Republic Act No. 9266 (RA 9266) was passed. It was known as the Architecture Act of 2004. It states that the architects shall be the sole professionals with the exclusive privilege to prepare, sign and seal architectural documents. PICE contested the decision and filed a bill in Congress seeking to make civil engineers the prime professional for buildings; some architects contested this filing by actively engaging civil engineers in print media to distinguish the two professional practices.

In 2005, the AAIF led the architects in defeating the 2004 bill filed by civil engineers in the Congress. The Department of Public Works and Highways (DPWH) published thrice the 2004 Revised Implementing Rules and Regulations (IRR) of PD 1096, the 1977 National Building Code, which states that only architects shall sign and seal architectural documents. PICE then sued the Secretary of DPWH over the matter, and UAP intervened with the case, which is now pending in the Supreme Court.

In 2007, the newly reconstituted Professional Regulatory Board of Architecture (PRBoA) commenced its active campaign against the perceived illegal practitioners of the architecture profession in the Philippines, including the civil engineers. PICE countered by suing the PRBoA Acting Chair in civil court. The Regional Trial Court of Manila favored with the architects in 2009 in the 2005 case filed by PICE against the DPWH Secretary, with UAP as the intervenor. PRBoA then fled 2 complaints at the Office of the Ombudsman (already consolidated) vs. the DPWH Secretary, 1 Senior DPWH Under Secretary, 1 DPWH Under Secretary, PICE and the publisher of a popular commercial (but intercalated) version of P.D. No. 1096 and its 2004 Revised IRR. In 2010, the PICE again sued the PRBoA Acting Chair at the Office of the Ombudsman, which was already twice dismissed by the Office of the Ombudsman.

In January 2012, the Court of Appeals ruled in favor of the PICE in the 2005 case it filed vs. the DPWH Secretary, with the UAP as Intervenor; UAP appealed the decision at the Supreme Court. In 2014 and 2015, Congress started hearing the new bills filed by both the architects and civil engineers. Based on the initial reading of the bills, the architects mainly seek to restore the portions of architectural practice (including limited structural design) lost through past legislation and to define the practice consistent with worldwide practices.

The suspended implementation of RA 9266 was deplored by the former President of the Philippine Senate, Aquilino Pimentel Jr., who states that it hampers effort to build public structures that is distinctly Filipino.

== Affiliations ==
The United Architects of the Philippines maintains active affiliations with various international and local institutions that support the advancement of the architectural profession and related fields. These partnerships help foster professional development, uphold standards of practice, and strengthen the organization's role in the global and national architectural landscape

=== International Institutions ===
- National Section of the International Union of Architects (UIA)
- Architects Regional Council Asia (ARCASIA)
- Eastern Regional Organization of Planning and Housing (EAROPH)
- APEC Architect Central Council

=== Local Institutions ===
- Professional Regulation Commission (PRC)
- Professional Regulatory Board of Architecture (PRBoA)
- Philippine Federation of Professional Associations (PFPA)
- Council for the Built and Natural Environments (CBNE)
- Philippine Council of Associations and Association Executives (PCAAE)

== Notable members ==
- Daniel Go: Architect of the CCF Center in Pasig and the BTTC Centre in San Juan.
- Francisco "Bobby" T. Mañosa: Pioneer of the Philippine neovernacular architecture and a National Artist of the Philippines.
- Ildefonso P. Santos Jr.: Known as the Father of Philippine Landscape Architecture.
- Royal Pineda: Architect of the New Clark City Sports Hub.

== See also ==
- Architecture of the Philippines
