= Zest-O =

Philippine food and beverage company

Zest-O Corporation
- Trade name: Zest-O
- Formerly: SEMEXCO Marketing Corporation (1980–1995)
- Company type: Private
- Industry: Food; Beverage
- Founded: January 16, 1980; 46 years ago
- Founder: Alfredo Yao
- Headquarters: 574 EDSA, Caloocan, Metro Manila, Philippines
- Area served: Worldwide
- Key people: Alfredo M. Yao (Chairman and CEO); Jeffrey S. Yao (President)
- Products: Juices; Soft drinks; Tea drinks; Bottled waters; Dairy products; Instant noodles; Condiments
- Brands: Zest-O; Plus; Sunglo; Beam; Quickchow
- Revenue: ▲ ₱2 million (2021)
- Number of employees: 1,000 (2022)
- Website: www.zesto.com.ph

Zest-O Corporation, commonly known as Zest-O, is a Philippine privately held food and beverage company based in Caloocan. It was founded in 1980 by the businessman Alfredo M. Yao.

== History ==
While touring Europe in 1979, Alfredo Yao learned about the Doypack packaging format in one of the European trade exhibits he visited. He bought one machine and tried to market the Doypack packaging format to juice drink manufacturers in the Philippines. When no company took interest, he decided to market his own brand of fruit juice drink. He put up a company called SEMEXCO Marketing Corporation and launched Zest-O orange juice drink in 1980.

Zest-O Cola, Zest-O Dalandan & Zest-O Calamansi carbonated soft drinks were introduced in 2000 while Zest-O Root Beer was introduced in 2005.

== Expansions ==
To date, the company also exports mango purées to China, Australia, New Zealand, Korea, Singapore, the United States, and Europe. Looking back, it started with 20 employees in a small corner of a compound. Zest-O Corporation now has over 1,000 workers in various offices across the Philippines.

Early in 2010, the company ventured with PT Kalbe Farma Tbk of Indonesia into the manufacture of a new line of energy drinks, said to be the largest pharmaceutical industry category in Southeast Asia. The new venture recently introduced to the Philippines, Indonesian and New Zealand markets its new line of energy drink called “Extra Joss”.
