= Philippine Institute of Civil Engineers =

Philippine professional organization

Philippine Institute of Civil Engineers, Inc.
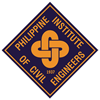
- Abbreviation: PICE
- Predecessor: Philippine Association of Civil Engineers
- Formation: 1937; 89 years ago
- Type: Professional Organization
- Legal status: Active
- Purpose: (a) the advancement of the knowledge and practice of civil engineering; (b) the fostering and improvement of civil engineering education; (c) the stimulation of research in civil engineering; (d) the professional improvement of its members; (e) the maintenance of high ethical standards in the practice of civil engineering; (f) the promotion of good public and private clientele relationships; (g) the development of fellowship among civil engineers; (h) the encouragement of professional relations with other allied technical and scientific organizations; (i) the establishment of a central point of reference and union for its members and the civil engineering profession; and (j) the acquisition, ownership, management and disposal of real and/or personal property incidental to or in furtherance of the above objectives of the Institute.
- Headquarters: 7th Floor Room 705, Future Point Plaza 1 Condominium, 112 Panay Avenue., South Triangle Quezon City 1103 Philippines
- Location: Philippines
- Region served: National and International
- Members: 213,000 (2024)
- President: ENGR. ADOR G. CANLAS
- President-Elect: ENGR. APRIL FRANCES AGATHA G. FLORES
- Vice-President: ENGR. MARIANO R. ALQUIZA, DPA
- Secretary: ENGR. CARY H. BEATISULA, Ph.D.
- Affiliations: Professional Regulation Commission
- Website: www.pice.org.ph
- Formerly called: Philippine Society of Civil Engineers, Philippine Association of Civil Engineers

The Philippine Institute of Civil Engineers or PICE is a professional organization for civil engineers in the Philippines. It was formed by merging two separate organizations of civil engineers: one group working from government sector and the second group working in the private sector.

== Brief history ==
In the late 1920s, group of civil engineers from the government sector formed the Philippine Society of Civil Engineers (PSCE) which was the first civil engineering organization in the Philippines with Engr. Marcial Kasilag as its first president.

In 1937, the Philippine Association of Civil Engineers (PACE) was formed. This time, it was a group of civil engineers in the private sector with Engr. Enrique Sto. Tomas Cortes as its first president.

The objectives of both organizations were similar with each other in which both of them wants to: "elevate the standards of the profession, encourage research and engineering knowledge and technology, foster fellowship among members, and promote interrelation with other technological and scientific societies."

The PACE being the most active than the PSCE led to the transfer of many PSCE members to PACE. In 1950, Republic Act No. 544 (also known as the "Civil Engineering Law") was passed through the efforts of PACE President Alberto Guevarra.

In 1972, PACE President Engr. Cesar A. Caliwara, exerted a serious effort in merging the two organization. Leaders of PACE and PSCE negotiated, and talked about the choice of name. Some concerns were raised such as formal accounting and turnover of assets and liabilities, accreditation of bonafide members and election rules for the first officers which were sooner resolved. These gave birth to the Philippine Institute of Civil Engineers Inc. and on December 11, 1973, the Securities and Exchange Commission issued a registration certificate to the association.

In February 1974, the first election of officers was held and Engr. Cesar Caliwara became its first president. In order to truly unite the civil engineers of the Philippines, provincial chapters were organized. On August 13, 1975, the Professional Regulation Commission (PRC) recognized the PICE as the only official organization of civil engineers in the Philippines.

== Present time ==
On November 5, 2014, Philippine President Benigno Aquino III issued a declaration by virtue of Proclamation No. 904 signed by Executive Secretary Paquito N. Ochoa Jr. and has declared the month of November of every year as Civil Engineering Month to bring to the attention and consciousness of the Filipino people the importance of the civil engineers in nation building. As of year 2020, PICE has more than 91,368 registered civil engineer-members in 105 chapters and some 21,177 civil engineering student-members in 210 student chapters throughout the country. The current National President is Engr. Ador G. Canlas

== Legal issues ==
In 2003. The United Architects of the Philippines (UAP) and PICE signed a joint resolution supporting the passage of Architecture and Civil Engineering bills delineating their respective scope of practice and to strengthen their collaborative efforts in common goals.

The two professional groups through their leaders stressed the need for the immediate passage of their respective bills, which would benefit their hundreds of thousand members nationwide.

In 2004, the Architecture Act was passed and signed into law. But in 2005, a petition for declaratory relief filed on May 3, 2005, by the PICE and Engr. Leo Cleto Gamolo to declare null and void Sections 302.3 and 302.4 of the Revised Implementing Rules and Regulations (“Revised IRR”) of Presidential Decree No. 1096 (the “National Building Code”). The said provisions require that architectural documents submitted in applications for building permits must be prepared, signed and sealed by architects. PICE claim that the said sections of the Revised IRR, by effectively prohibiting Civil Engineers from also preparing, signing and sealing architectural documents, are contrary to the National Building Code and the Republic Act No. 544 (the “Civil Engineering Law”), which purportedly gave Civil Engineers the said right. After several court hearings at the Manila Regional Trial Court, the PICE's motion was denied and the RTC ruled in favor of the architects. This issue was brought by the PICE to the Court of Appeals.

On January 5, 2012, the Court of Appeals, in its decision granted the appeal of PICE and reversed the Decision of the Regional Trial Court thus giving the Civil Engineers the rights from preparing, signing and sealing architectural documents

On March 15, 2023, the Philippine Supreme Court's Second Division, in a decision penned by Senior Associate Justice Marvic Leonen, issued a landmark ruling. The court clarified that only registered and licensed architects can prepare, sign, and seal architectural documents. This decision resolved a long-standing conflict between the Architecture Act of 2004 (RA 9266) and the Civil Engineering Law (RA 544). The Civil Engineering Law previously granted some authority to civil engineers over architectural documents, but the Supreme Court found that the Architecture Act took precedence. This decision aims to ensure that architectural plans are created by qualified professionals, potentially improving building safety and design.

== Chapters ==
=== Regular chapter ===
The general membership of the institute, except for the honorary and student members, was organized into autonomous chapters composed of members residing or having principal sites of business in the area to be served by the chapter. The regular chapters are formed for the purpose of:

- Fostering closer association among members in an area or locality;
- Encouraging the members to prepare and discuss papers on the study of civil engineering problems in that area or locality; and
- Encouraging the cooperation with other allied engineering, technical or scientific groups in the area or locality in matters of common interest.

=== Student chapter ===
The institute supports the formation of student chapters in engineering Institutions in order to:

- Encourage civil engineering students to work together in fellowship and dedication to Science and Technology;
- Enhance and improve civil engineering standards, curricula and facilities in schools;
- Provide encouragement, guidance and leadership to civil engineering students; and
- Promote association of civil engineering students with the members of the civil engineering profession.

The regular chapters are tasked to supervise all student chapters organized in their areas and aid them in their undertakings.

=== International chapter ===
Upon the approval of the Securities and Exchange Commission (SEC) to the amended By-laws (November 25, 1999), the formation of international chapters was made possible. The chapters, which are based on other countries, is a manifestation of the institute's commitment to reach-out to Filipino civil engineers around the world and to establish a more concrete point of union for Filipino civil engineers.

- PICE Saudi Arabia-Eastern Province
- PICE Saudi Arabia-Riyadh Region Chapter
- PICE Qatar Chapter
- PICE Oman Chapter
- PICE Singapore Chapter
- PICE Bahrain Chapter
- PICE UAE Chapter
- PICE Saudi Arabia-Western Region
- PICE Brunei Chapter
- PICE Kuwait Chapter
- PICE USA Chapter
- PICE South Korea Chapter
- PICE Papua New Guinea Chapter

=== Affiliate societies ===
- Association of Structural Engineers of the Philippines (ASEP)
- Association of Accredited Consultant CE of the Philippines (AACCEP)
- Association of Civil Engineering Educators of the Philippines (ACEEP)
- City and Municipal Engineers Association of the Philippines (CMEAP)
- District Engineers League of the Philippines (DELP)
- Philippine Association of Building Officials (PABO)
- Provincial Engineers Association of the Philippines (PEAP)
- Road Engineering Association of the Philippines (REAP)
- Philippine Accredited Materials Engineers Association (PAMEA)
- Filipino Planning Engineers Association (FPEA)
- Structural Engineers Association of Davao (SEAD)

== Notable members ==
- Fidel V. Ramos - Honorary member - popularly known as FVR, was the 12th President of the Philippines from 1992 to 1998. He graduated from the United States Military Academy with Bachelor of Science in Military Engineering. He also graduated in University of Illinois with master's degree in civil engineering.
- Angel R. Lazaro Jr. - Past President (1968) - he topped the CE board examination in 1938 and also topped the board examination for Architects in 1958. He is well known for the restoration of seven (7) 400-year-old national heritage churches located in various parts of the Philippines, rural and public markets either privately or government owned, urban health and nutrition projects of the Department of Health.
- Angel A. Lazaro, III - Past President (1983) - He is the receiver of Certificates of Recognition as Structural Engineer and Civil Engineering Educator from the Board of Civil Engineering. He was acknowledged as the Most Outstanding Civil Engineer Award from the Professional Regulation Commission in 1994. He is also Past President of the Confederation of Filipino Consulting Organizations (COFILCO), National Society for Seismology and Earthquake Engineering of the Philippines (NSSEEP), Philippine Federation of Professional Associations (PFPA), Road Engineering Association of the Philippines (REAP), Philippine Association for Technological Education (PATE), American Concrete Institute, Philippine Chapter (ACI-RP) and Council of Filipino Consultants (COFIC)
- David M. Consunji - Past President (1989–1990) - he is the Chairman of publicly listed holding firm, DMCI Holdings, Incorporated. A former Secretary of the Department of Public Works, Transportation and Communications. In 2010, Forbes listed him as the 12th richest Filipino with a net worth of US$715 million.
- Felipe F. Cruz - Past President (1997–1998) - he is a TOFIL Awardee for General Construction in 2007. His notable projects are some of the country's most efficient industrial plants, such as: the Tongonan 1, 2, & 3 Geothermal Power Plant in Leyte, the San Roque Hydroelectric Plant in Pangasinan, and the Tiwi 1&2 Geothermal Power Plant in Albay
