= Professional Regulation Commission =

Government commission in the Philippines

- Komisyon sa Regulasyong Pampropesyonal

- Professional Regulation Commission Central Office in Sampaloc, Manila

Agency overview
- Formed: June 22, 1973
- Jurisdiction: Philippines
- Headquarters: P. Paredes corner Nicanor Reyes (Morayta) Streets, Sampaloc, Manila
- Employees: 894 (2024)
- Annual budget: ₱1.54 billion (2021)
- Agency executives: Charito A. Zamora, Chairperson; Erwin M. Enad, Commissioner I; Conrado T. Onglao, Commissioner II
- Parent agency: Department of Labor and Employment
- Website: www.prc.gov.ph

The Professional Regulation Commission (PRC; Filipino: Komisyon sa Regulasyong Pampropesyonal) is a three-member commission attached to Department of Labor and Employment (DOLE). Its mandate is to regulate and supervise the practice of professionals (except lawyers, who are handled by the Supreme Court of the Philippines) who constitute the highly skilled manpower of Philippines.

As the agency-in-charge of the professional sector, the PRC plays a strategic role in developing the corps of professionals for industry, commerce, governance, and the economy.

== History ==
=== Foundations of Professional Regulation (1901‒1973) ===
Before the country established a central agency for professional regulation, various independent boards were established between 1901 and 1950, such as:

- the Board of Medical Examiners, established on December 4, 1901, through Act No. 310
- the Board of Accountancy, established on March 17, 1923, through Act No. 3105; and
- the Board of Electrical Engineering Examiners, established on June 21, 1947, through Republic Act No. 184

To centralize such agencies, the Office of the Board of Examiners was created on June 17, 1950, through Republic Act No. 546, under the supervision of the Civil Service Commission.

=== Creation of the Commission (1973‒1999) ===
On June 22, 1973, President Ferdinand Marcos signed the Presidential Decree No. 223 on June 22, 1973, establishing the Professional Regulation Commission (PRC) and abolishing the Office of the Board Examiners. The first PRC Commissioner, Architect Eric C. Nubla assumed office on January 2, 1974, while its Implementing Rules and Regulations of Presidential Decree 223 were promulgated on December 9, 1974.

The PRC Coat-of-Arms designed by the Heraldry Commission was officially adopted on February 1, 1974. The PRC began issuing certificates of registration in Filipino with English translation.

In 1975, it saw the computerization of the database of registered professionals with the assistance of the National Computer Center. On that same year, PRC began issuing computer-printed registration cards with one-year validity and starts accrediting professional organizations.

On December 11, 1975, President Ferdinand Marcos signed the Presidential Decree No. 839, transferring the supervision of the PRC from the Office of the President to the Civil Service Commission.

=== Modernization (2000‒present) ===
The agency went a major overhaul with the enactment of the Republic Act No. 8981, known as the PRC Modernization Act of 2000, signed by President Joseph Estrada. The Implementing Rules and Regulations of the act were adopted on February 15, 2001.

On September 11, 2006, President Gloria Macapagal Arroyo signed the Executive Order No. 565, transferring the supervision of the PRC again from the Civil Service Commission (after more than three decades) to the Department of Labor and Employment.

==== Continuing Professional Development (CPD) Act ====
The Republic Act No. 10912, also known as the Continuing Professional Development (CPD) Act, was introduced after it lapsed into law on July 21, 2016. The law mandates professionals to participate in ongoing learning and training to renew their licenses.

===== Criticism =====
Since its full implementation in 2017, the law has faced significant criticism from various professional sectors, with reasons ranging from the cost of applying credits to administrative burden. In response to the criticisms and several legislative attempts, the PRC issued Resolution No. 2019-1146 on February 7, 2019, aiming at easing the transition for professionals by significantly reducing the required credit units for license renewal and expanding the list of activities eligible for credit.

== Functions ==
Executive	Administer, implements, and enforces the regulatory policies of the national government, including the maintenance of professional and occupational standards and ethics and the enforcement of the rules and regulations relative thereto.
Quasi-Judicial	Investigates cases against erring examinees and professionals. Its decisions have the force and effect of the decisions of a court of law, with the same level of authority as a Regional Trial Court. After the lapse of the period within which to file an appeal, Commission decisions become final and executory.
Quasi-Legislative	Formulates rules and policies on professional regulation. When published in the official gazette, these rules have the force and effect of law.

== Mandate ==
Republic Act 8981, otherwise known as the "PRC Modernization Act Of 2000", mandates the following:

- Institutionalization of centerpiece programs

1. full computerization
2. careful selection of Professional Regulatory Board members, and
3. monitoring of school performance to upgrade quality of education

- Updating of organizational structure for operational efficiency and effectiveness;
- Strengthening of PRC's enforcement powers, including regulatory powers over foreign professionals practicing in the country;
- Authority to use income for full computerization; and
- Upgrading of compensation and allowances of Chairperson to that of a Department Secretary and those of the Commissioners to that of Undersecretary.

== Regulated professions ==
The Commission currently exercises oversight on forty-six (46) Professional Regulatory Boards. While each board were formed by distinct laws, they all exercise administrative, quasi-legislative, and quasi-judicial powers over their respective professions, subject to review and approval by the Commission. Core functions include:

- Preparing licensure examination content, prescribing and revising professional course requirements
- Administer oaths, authorizing the Certificates of Registration, and enforcing Code of Ethics for their respective professions
- Conducting inspections of schools and related establishments for compliance with professional standards
- Investigating violations of professional laws and examine administrative cases, with the ability to suspend or revoke professional licenses

Current Professional Regulatory Boards and corresponding Accredited Professional Organization (APO)
Name of Board	Category	Enabling Law(s)/Related Act(s)	Accredited Professional Organization (APO/AIPO)	Umbrella Council (according to the Philippine Federation of Professional Associations (PFPA))
Agriculture	Agriculture	PRC Resolution No. 2000-663; Republic Act No. 8435	Philippine Association of Agriculturists, Inc. (PAA)	Council for the Built and Natural Environments
Architecture	Architecture and Design	Republic Act No. 9266	United Architects of the Philippines (UAP)	Council for the Built and Natural Environments
Interior Design	Architecture and Design	Republic Act No. 10350	Philippine Institute of Interior Designers (PIID)	Council for the Built and Natural Environments
Landscape Architecture	Architecture and Design	Republic Act No. 9053	Philippine Association of Landscape Architects (PALA)	Council for the Built and Natural Environments
Master Plumbing	Architecture and Design	Republic Act No. 1378	National Master Plumbers Association of the Philippines (NAMPAP)	Council for the Built and Natural Environments
Accountancy	Business	Republic Act No. 9298	Philippine Institute of Certified Public Accountants (PICPA)	Council of Business and Management Professionals
Real Estate Services	Business	Republic Act No. 9646	Philippine Association of Realty Consultants and Specialists (PARCS)	Council of Business and Management Professionals
Librarianship	Communication and Information Science	Republic Act No. 9246	Philippine Librarians Association, Inc. (PLAI)	Council of Business and Management Professionals
Professional Teachers	Education	Republic Act No. 7836; Republic Act No. 9293	Philippine Association For Teachers & Educators (Pafte), Inc.	Council of Business and Management Professionals
Aeronautical Engineering	Engineering	Presidential Decree No. 1570	Society of Aerospace Engineers of the Philippines (SAEP)	Philippine Technological Council
Agricultural and Biosystems Engineering	Engineering	Republic Act No. 10915	Philippine Society of Agricultural Engineers (PSAE)	Philippine Technological Council
Chemical Engineering	Engineering	Republic Act No. 9297	Philippine Institute of Chemical Engineers (PIChE)	Philippine Technological Council
Civil Engineering	Engineering	Republic Act No. 544; Republic Act No. 1582	Philippine Institute of Civil Engineers (PICE)	Philippine Technological Council
Electrical Engineering	Engineering	Republic Act No. 7920	Institute of Integrated Electrical Engineers of the Philippines, Inc. (IIEE)	Philippine Technological Council
Electronics and Communications Engineering	Engineering	Republic Act No. 9292	Institute of Electronics Engineers of the Philippines, Inc. (IECEP)	Philippine Technological Council
Geodetic Engineering	Engineering	Republic Act No. 8560	Geodetic Engineers of the Philippines (GEP)	Philippine Technological Council
Mechanical Engineering	Engineering	Republic Act No. 8495	Philippine Society of Mechanical Engineers (PSME)	Philippine Technological Council
Metallurgical Engineering	Engineering	Republic Act No. 10688	Society of Metallurgical Engineers of the Philippines (SMEP)	Philippine Technological Council
Mining Engineering	Engineering	Republic Act No. 4274	Philippine Society of Mining Engineers (PSEM)	Philippine Technological Council
Marine Engineering (Naval Architecture)	Engineering	Republic Act No. 4565	Society of Naval Architects and Marine Engineers (SONAME)	Philippine Technological Council
Sanitary Engineering	Engineering	Republic Act No. 1364	Philippine Society of Sanitary Engineers (PSSE)	Philippine Technological Council
Dentistry	Health Sciences	Republic Act No. 9484	Philippine Dental Association (PDA)	Council of Professional Health Associations
Medical Technology	Health Sciences	Republic Act No. 5527	Philippine Association of Medical Technologists, Inc. (PAMET)	Council of Professional Health Associations
Medicine	Health Sciences	Republic Act No. 2382; Republic Act No. 4224; Republic Act No. 5946	Philippine Medical Association (PMA)	Council of Professional Health Associations
Midwifery	Health Sciences	Republic Act No. 7392	Integrated Midwives Association of the Philippines (IMAP)	Council of Professional Health Associations
Nursing	Health Sciences	Republic Act No. 9173	Philippine Nurses Association (PNA)	Council of Professional Health Associations
Nutrition and Dietetics	Health Sciences	Republic Act No. 10862	Nutritionist-Dietitians' Association of the Philippines (NDAP)	Council of Professional Health Associations
Occupational Therapy	Health Sciences	Republic Act No. 11241	Unknown	Council of Professional Health Associations
Optometry	Health Sciences	Republic Act No. 8050	Integrated Philippine Association of Optometrists, Inc. (IPAO)	Council of Professional Health Associations
Pharmacy	Health Sciences	Republic Act No. 10918	Philippine Pharmacists Association, Inc. (PPHA)	Council of Professional Health Associations
Physical Therapy	Health Sciences	Republic Act No. 5680	Philippine Physical Therapy Association, Inc. (PPTA)	Council of Professional Health Associations
Radiologic Technology	Health Sciences	Republic Act No. 7431	Philippine Association of Radiologic Technologists (PART)	Council of Professional Health Associations
Respiratory Therapy	Health Sciences	Republic Act No. 10024	Association of Respiratory Care Practitioners, Philippines, Inc. (ARCPP)	Council of Professional Health Associations
Speech-Language Pathology	Health Sciences	Republic Act No. 11249	Philippine Association of Speech-Language Pathologists (PASP)	Council of Professional Health Associations
Chemistry	Natural Sciences	Republic Act No. 10657	Integrated Chemists of the Philippines (ICP)	Council for the Built and Natural Environments
Environmental Planning	Natural Sciences	Republic Act No. 10587	Philippine Institute of Environmental Planners (PIEP)	Council for the Built and Natural Environments
Fisheries	Natural Sciences	Republic Act No. 8550; PRC Resolution No. 2000-664; Republic Act No. 11398	Philippine Society of Fisheries, Inc. (PSF)	Council of Business and Management Professionals
Food Technology	Natural Sciences	Republic Act No. 11052	Unknown	Unknown
Foresters	Natural Sciences	Republic Act No. 10690	Society of Filipino Foresters, Inc. (SFF)	Council for the Built and Natural Environments
Geology	Natural Sciences	Republic Act No. 10166	Geological Society of the Philippines (GSP)	Council for the Built and Natural Environments
Veterinary Medicine	Natural Sciences	Republic Act No. 9268	Philippine Veterinary Medical Association (PVMA)	Council of Professional Health Associations
Customs Brokers	Public Administration	Republic Act No. 9280	Chamber of Customs Brokers (CCB)	Council of Business and Management Professionals
Criminology	Social Sciences	Republic Act No. 6506; Republic Act No. 11131	Professional Criminologist Association of the Philippines (PCAP)	Council of Business and Management Professionals
Guidance and Counseling	Social Sciences	Republic Act No. 9258	Philippine Guidance Counseling Association, Inc. (PGCA)	Council of Professional Health Associations
Psychology	Social Sciences	Republic Act No. 10029	Psychological Association of the Philippines (PAP)	Council of Professional Health Associations
Social Workers	Social Sciences	Republic Act No. 4373	Philippine Association of Social Workers, Inc. (PASWI)	Council of Professional Health Associations

== Outstanding Professional of the Year Awards (OPYA) ==
The Outstanding Professional of the Year Award is the highest distinction conferred by the Commission upon a registered professional. It was first established in 1997, and annually awards outstanding professionals in field clusters:

- Business, Education and Social
- Engineering
- Health and allied
- Technology

Notable recipients of awards include Josefa Jara Martinez (Social Worker of the Year, 1978).

== See also ==
- Department of Labor and Employment (Philippines)
- Professional Regulatory Board of Architecture
- Integrated Bar of the Philippines
