= Hotel101 =

Philippine hotel management company

Hotel 101 Global Holdings Corp.
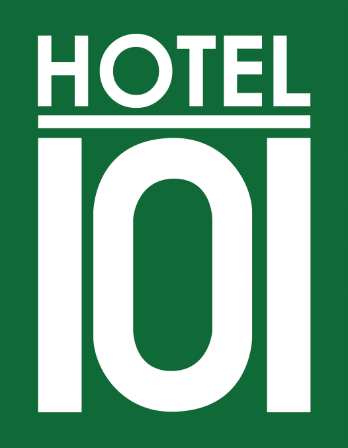
- Company type: Public
- Traded as: Nasdaq: HBNB
- Industry: Hospitality / Real estate
- Founded: 2016; 10 years ago (Note: Opening of first hotel, date of incorporation as a company is unknown) in Pasay
- Headquarters: Pasay, Philippines
- Area served: Metro Manila and Madrid
- Products: Condo hotel units
- Services: Hotel management
- Owner: DoubleDragon Corporation
- Website: hotel101.com hotel101global.com

Hotel101 Global Holdings Corp. is a condo hotel developer and hotel management company originating from the Philippines.

== History ==
DoubleDragon Corporation of Tony Tan Caktiong and Edgar Sia is the parent company of Hotel101 Global. Originally it was under the Hotel of Asia Inc. (HOA) of Sia which was established in 2011 and runs Jinjiang Inn franchises in the Philippines.

The first hotel under the brand opened in June 2016. Hotel101-Manila opened in Pasay City near the Mall of Asia complex. By the end of 2016, DoubleDragon completes acquisition of majority of the stakes in Hotel101.

In December 2018, Hotel101 announced it has been considering expanding operations outside the Philippines in a bid to become an international hotel brand.

Despite COVID-19 pandemic in 2022, the company continued working on its expansion plans. It credits employees of business process outsourcing firms for keeping hotel occupancy rates at 80 percent during the pandemic.

The second Hotel101, Hotel101-Fort, opened in August 2023 in Bonifacio Global City, Taguig.

On August 26, 2023, its first international hotel located in Niseko, Japan broke ground. This was followed by a hotel in Madrid, Spain in March 2024. Hotel101 - Madrid would open 2 years later.

By December 2023, Hotel101 had established its global headquarters in Singapore. On June 27, 2025, it became the first Filipino-owned firm to be listed on the Nasdaq Stock Exchange in New York.

== Business model ==
Hotel101 are condo hotels where individual units or rooms are owned by investors and rented out to people like a hotel room. The rooms are managed by the company. Rooms in Hotel101, branded as "Happy Rooms" are uniform in design and floor area at 26 square meters (280 sq ft).

== Hotels ==
Existing

Hotel	Location	Rooms	Opened	Ref.
Hotel101 – Manila	Pasay	518	2016	
Hotel101 – Fort	Taguig	606	2023	
Hotel101 - Madrid	Madrid	680	2026	

Under-construction

Hotel	Location	Country	Rooms	Broke ground	Planned opening	Ref.
Hotel101 – Cebu Mactan Airport	Lapu-Lapu City	Philippines	548	–	2025	
Hotel101 – Davao	Davao City	Philippines	519	–	–	
Hotel101 Resort – Boracay	Malay, Aklan	Philippines	1,001	–	–	
Hotel101 - Roxas Boulevard	Pasay	Philippines	700	-	2028	
Hotel101 – Niseko	Niseko, Hokkaido	Japan	482	2023	–	
Hotel101 – Libis	Quezon City	Philippines	702	2024	2026	
Hotel101 – Los Angeles	Los Angeles	United States	622	–	2026	
Hotel101 - Milan	Milan	Italy	429	-	2028	
