= Yong He =

Yong He may refer to:

- Yonghe (disambiguation)
- He Yong (disambiguation) — a list of Chinese people with the surname of "He"
