= Galicier =

Galicier may refer to:

- German-language word for the Galicians, an ethnic group of Spain
- Émilienne Galicier (1911–2007), French politician
- The predecessor to Tiong Bahru Galicier Pastry, a former bakery in the Tiong Bahru area of Singapore
