= Jollibee Group =

Philippine multinational company

Jollibee Foods Corporation

- Jollibee Plaza (leftmost building), the firm's headquarters.
- Trade name: Jollibee Group
- Type: Public
- Traded as: PSE: JFC
- ISIN: PHY4466S1007
- Industry: Restaurants
- Founded: January 1978; 48 years ago in Cubao, Quezon City (Note: The JFC states that its date of incorporation was on January 28, 1978 while the Philippine Stock Exchange list the date of incorporation as January 11, 1978.)
- Founder: Tony Tan Caktiong
- Headquarters: Jollibee Plaza, Ortigas Center, Pasig, Metro Manila, Philippines
- Number of locations: ▲10,943 restaurants (2026 9M)
- Area served: Asia, Australia, Middle East, Western Europe and North America
- Key people: Tony Tan Caktiong (Chairman); Ernesto Tanmantiong (President and CEO)
- Products: hamburgers; chicken; fries; coffee; desserts; breakfast; dumplings; pizzas; cakes; pastries
- Revenue: ▲ ₱305.11 billion (2025)
- Operating income: ▲ ₱20.15 billion (2025)
- Net income: ▲ ₱11.005 billion(2025)
- Total assets: ▲ ₱282.996 billion (2025)
- Total equity: ▲ ₱94.57 billion (2024)
- Number of employees: ▲43,605 (2024)
- Subsidiaries: List: Fresh N' Famous Foods (Chowking, Greenwich); Red Ribbon Bakeshop, Inc.; Mang Inasal Philippines, Inc.; Perf Restaurants, Inc. (Burger King Philippines); Smashburger IP Holder; Superfoods Group; The Coffee Bean & Tea Leaf; JBPX Foods, Inc. (Panda Express Philippines); Yoshinoya Jollibee Foods, Inc. (Yoshinoya Philippines)
- Website: jollibeegroup.com

Jollibee Foods Corporation (JFC), doing business as Jollibee Group, is a Philippine multinational company headquartered in Pasig, Metro Manila, Philippines. JFC is the owner of the fast food brand Jollibee.

With the success of its flagship brand, JFC acquired some of its competitors in the fast food business in the Philippines and abroad such as Chowking, Greenwich, Red Ribbon, and Mang Inasal. As of September 2025, Jollibee Group's total store network has reached 10,304 stores composed of 3,445 branches in the Philippines and 6,859 locations worldwide bringing in a net income of P8.65 billion for the first 9 months of 2025.

== Background ==
First corporate logo from 2009 to 2025

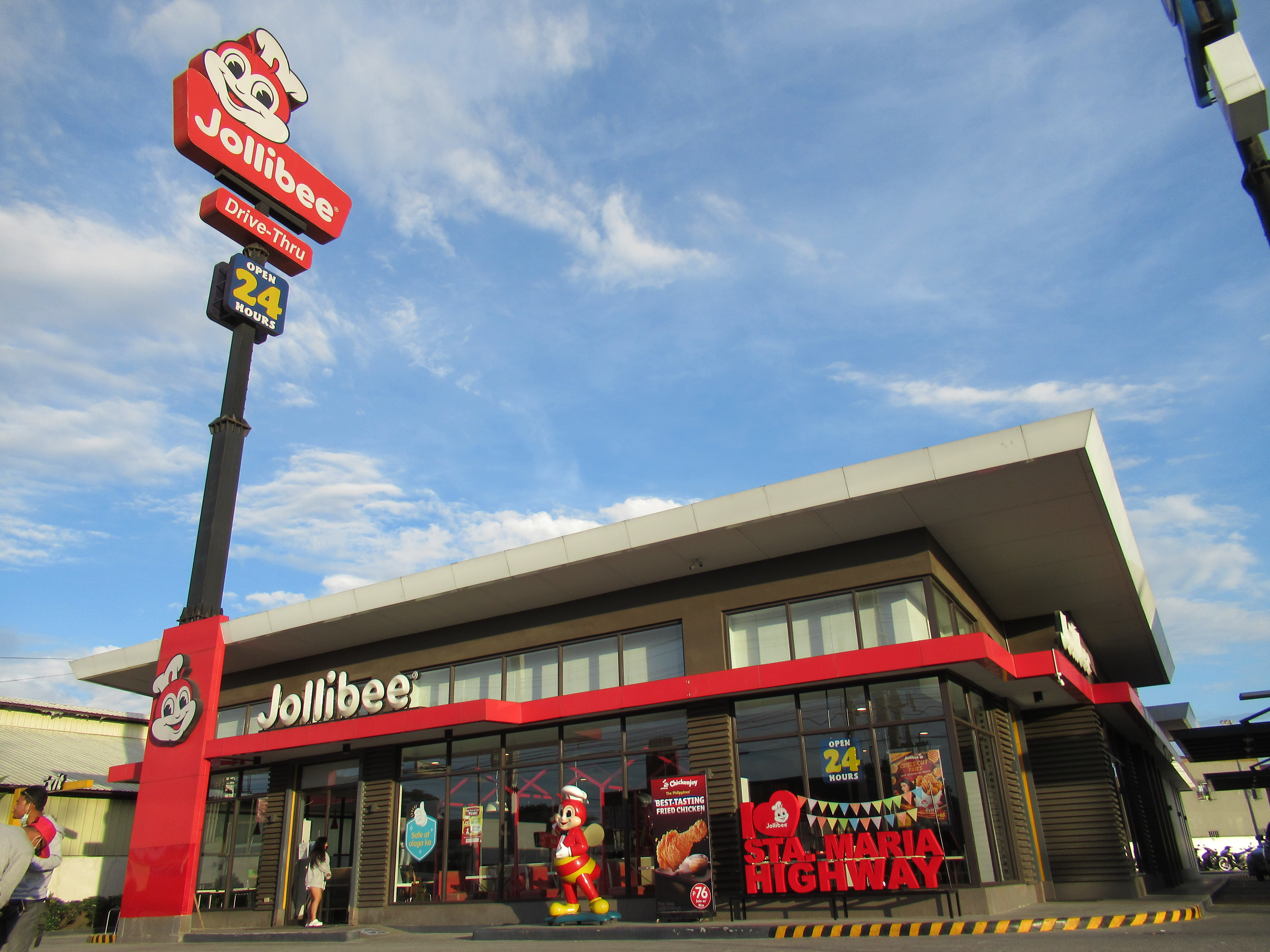
An outlet of Jollibee, the company's primary fast food brand, in Santa Maria, Bulacan

In 1975, Tony Tan Caktiong and his family opened a Magnolia Ice Cream parlor in Cubao, Quezon City which is credited as the first Jollibee outlet. The Magnolia outlets operated by the Tan Caktiong clan began offering hot meals and sandwiches upon request from the customers which the family found out to be more popular than the franchise's ice cream. In 1978, the family decided to cancel the Magnolia franchise and converted the ice cream parlors they operated into fast food outlets. Management consultant Manuel C. Lumba advised the family on the move.

The Jollibee Foods Corporation was incorporated in January 1978. It opened its first store overseas in Singapore in 1985 at the Katong Shopping Centre; that location closed only a year later.

Jollibee experienced rapid growth. It was able to withstand the entry of McDonald's in the Philippines in 1981 by focusing on the specific tastes of the Filipino market, which differed from the American fast food company. On July 13, 1993, JFC was listed at the Philippine Stock Exchange.

In 2011, JFC opened 260 new stores, of which 167 were in the Philippines led by Mang Inasal (86) and Jollibee (40). This brought the company's total number of stores to 2,001 as of the end of December 2011. The same year, Jollibee closed Manong Pepe foodchain in favor of Mang Inasal, and sold Délifrance to CaféFrance. Overseas, Jollibee opened 93 stores, led by Yonghe King in China (70) and Jollibee Vietnam (11).

It has 1,668 locations across 17 countries as of July 2024, with its recent opening in Canada, the brand's 100th store in North America.

=== Data breaches ===
In December 2017, JFC was a victim of a data breach by hackers who gained access to the customer database of the Jollibee website. In May 2018, Jollibee's online food delivery operations were suspended as a result of the breach, in compliance with the National Privacy Commission's directive.

In June 2024, the company was a victim of another data breach by hackers which affected its 32 million food delivery service customers.

== Acquisition history ==
=== Philippine brands ===
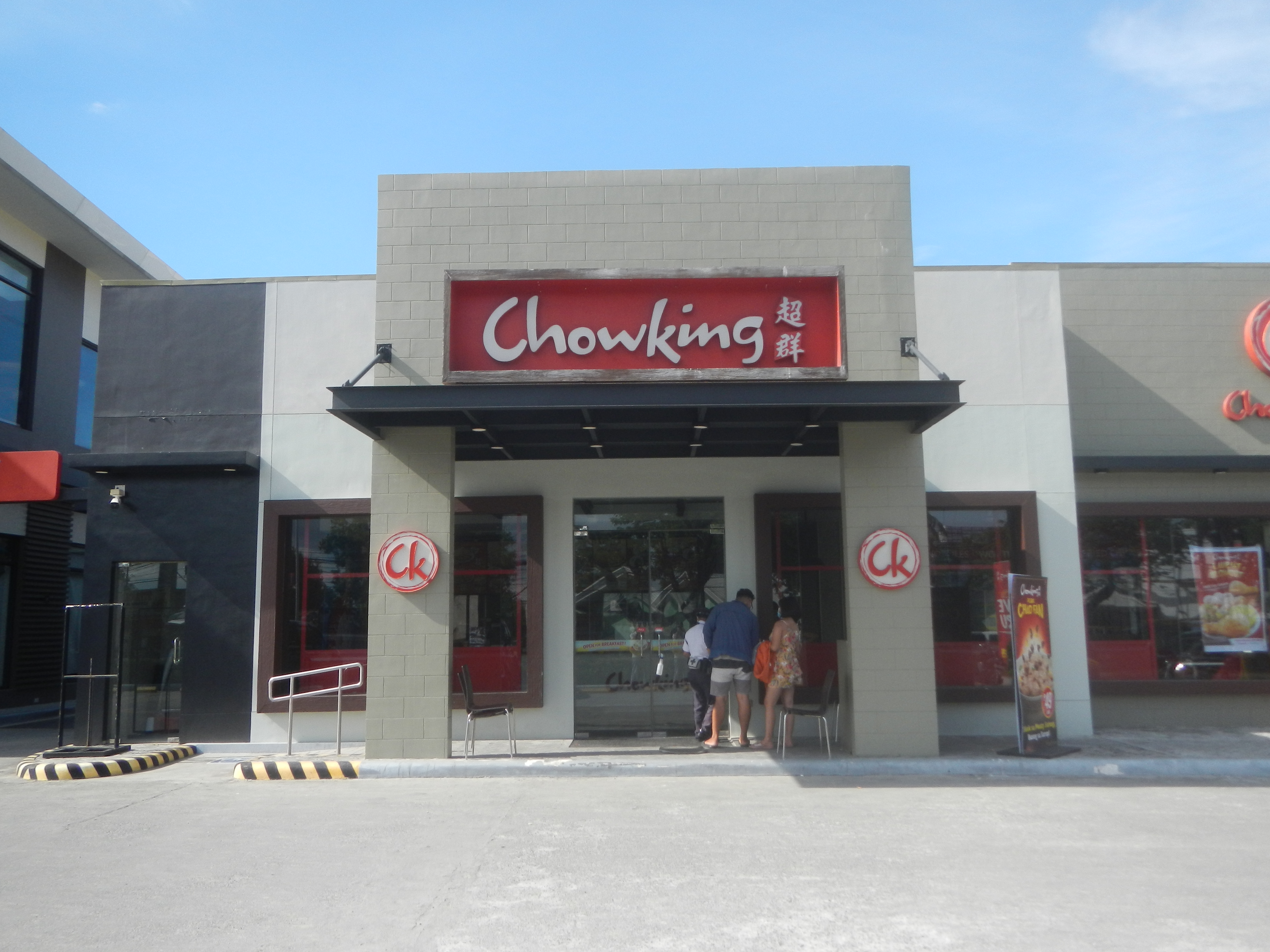
Chowking, one of the company's fast food chain brands

JFC acquired 80% of Greenwich Pizza, a fast-food restaurant specializing in pizza and pasta, in 1994. From a 50-branch operation, Greenwich gradually established a strong presence in the food service industry. In early 2006, the company bought out the remaining shares of its partners in Greenwich Pizza Corp., equivalent to a 20% stake, for ₱384 million in cash.

In 2000, the company acquired Chowking, a Chinese fast-food restaurant, thus making it a part of the Chinese quick service restaurant segment.

In 2005, the company acquired Red Ribbon, a bakeshop business.

On October 19, 2010, the company acquired 70% share of Mang Inasal, a Filipino fast-food restaurant specializing in barbecued chicken, for ₱3 billion ($68.8 million). On April 22, 2016, the company bought out the remaining shares of its partner, equivalent to a 30% stake, for ₱2 billion in cash.

JFC subsidiary Fresh N' Famous Foods, Inc. manages the Greenwich and Chowking brands. The Red Ribbon brand is under Red Ribbon Bakeshop Inc. which in turn is managed by a holding company of the JFC, RRB Holdings, Inc. The company also has stakes on Burger King's outlets in the Philippines through Perf Restaurants, Inc. which is 54 percent owned by JFC as of 2012.

=== Foreign brands ===
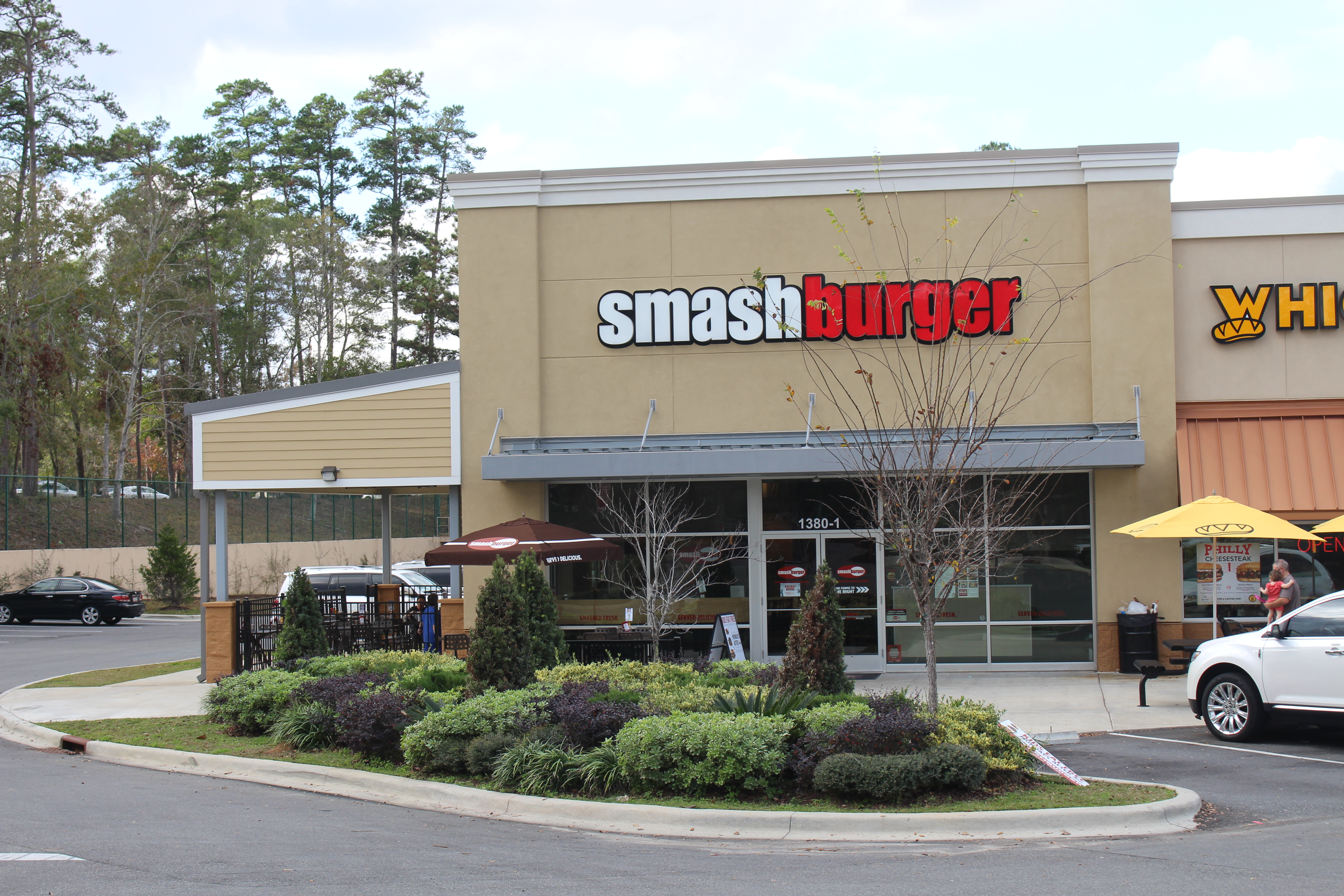
Smashburger, a food outlet chain owned by JFC based in the United States

JFC has stakes in restaurant chains based or originating outside the Philippines such as in Mainland China, Taiwan, South Korea, Canada, and the United States, as well as master franchises of foreign brands in the Philippines.

==== Mainland China, Hong Kong and Taiwan ====
In 2004, JFC acquired Chinese fast food chain Yonghe King for $22.5 million.

In 2006, the company purchased Taichung-based Chun Shui Tang tea house.

In 2007, the company acquired Chinese fast-food chain Hong Zhuang Yuan for $50.5 million.

In 2008, the company purchased 70% of Taiwan-based restaurant Lao Dong.

In 2009, the company divested its shares from Lao Dong and Chun Shui Tang, in an effort to focus on bigger restaurant chains in mainland China.

In 2010, the company signed a deal to acquire 55 percent of China's Guangxi San Ping Wang Food and Beverage Management Co. Ltd., operators of the San Pin Wang beef noodle business for 30 million RMB. However, the company divested its shares in San Ping Wang Food and Beverage Management Co. Ltd. in 2017 to focus on Yonghe King.

In 2015, the company formed a joint venture with Jasmine Asset Holdings Ltd. to operate the Dunkin' Donuts master franchise in China. However, the company announced the termination of the master franchise deal in 2022.

In May 2018, the company announced that it acquired a 45% stake in the master franchise of Tim Ho Wan, a Michelin-star dim sum restaurant chain in Asia Pacific, for SG$45 million from its private equity fund investment Titan Dining Partners Limited. Tim Ho Wan Private holds the exclusive long-term master franchise to run Tim Ho Wan within the Asia Pacific region, excluding ones in Hong Kong. Dim Sum Private, on the other hand, owns and operates Tim Ho Wan chains in Singapore. The company later acquired full control of the ownership and management of the Tim Ho Wan business in 2025 through wholly owned subsidiary, Jollibee Worldwide Pte. Ltd (JWPL), by buying out the remaining stake of Titan Dining Partners Limited.

In November 2021, the company announced that it acquired a 51% stake in Taiwan-based bubble tea chain Milksha for $12.8 million.

In January 2025, the company announced its majority-owned subsidiary Milksha acquired a 70% stake in Taiwan-based Tien Hsia Sheng Co., Ltd.'s Moon Moon Food.

The Yonghe King and Hong Zhuang Yuan chains are under JFC's SuperFoods Group.

Its restaurants in mainland China are responsible for about 12% of the company's total sales, mostly through chains it has acquired.

==== Vietnam ====
In 2011, JFC acquired 50% of SuperFoods Group, the owner and operator of the Hard Rock Cafe franchise in Vietnam, Highlands Coffee, and PHO24. The company later increased this stake to 60% in 2017.

In 2012, the company acquired a 50% stake in Highlands Coffee then increased this stake to 60% in 2017.

In 2018, the company announced plans to launch PHO24 in the Philippines, with its first branch opening in 2021. However, in 2023, the company sold assets of said chain to East-West Restaurant Concepts, a wholly owned subsidiary of Viet Thai International Joint Stock Co. and instead aimed to focus on growing its new businesses at the time in Tim Ho Wan, Yoshinoya, and Milksha.

==== South Korea ====
In July 2024, JFC's subsidiary, Jollibee Worldwide Pte. Ltd., acquired $340 million shares of Compose Coffee (Coffee Co. Ltd. and JMCF Co. Ltd. which have 2,612 stores in South Korea), leaving Titan Dining II LP and Elevation Equity Partners Korea Limited to retain 5% and 25%, respectively. In February 2026, JFC announced its plan to launch Compose Coffee in the Philippines. In August 2026, it opened its first Compose Coffee outlet at Market! Market!.

In February 2026, JFC announced that it had signed a definitive agreement to acquire All Day Fresh Co. Ltd., owner and operator of hot pot and eat-all-you-can restaurant chain Shabu All Day, for $87 million through its subsidiary, Jolli-K Co. Ltd.

==== United States ====
In July 2008, JFC acquired a stake in US-based Chow Fun Holdings LLC, the developer and owner of Jinja Bar Bistro in New Mexico, in which Jollibee acquired a 12% stake for $950,000 and later increased its stake to 80.55% in 2011. However, the company divested its shares in Chow Fun Holdings LLC in 2016 to focus on its larger businesses in the US.

In October 2015, the company announced that it had acquired a 40-percent stake in Smashburger in a deal that values the American fast-casual burger chain at $335 million. In December 2018, the company acquired 100 percent of the shares in Smashburger, gaining full control of the American hamburger chain.

On September 7, 2018, the company announced its acquisition of a 47% stake in US-based Mexican food restaurant, Tortas Frontera of Rick Bayless for $12.4 million.

In July 2019, the company announced that it acquired The Coffee Bean & Tea Leaf for $350 million.

==== Philippines ====
In 1995, JFC jointly opened a Philippine branch of Délifrance with master franchisee Delifrance Asia Ltd. The company became the sole franchisee of the bakery chain in the Philippines in 2006 through its subsidiary Fresh N' Famous Foods. The franchise agreement between the company and Délifrance Asia ended on December 31, 2011, and assets of Délifrance in the Philippines were sold to CafeFrance Corp. CafeFrance Corp. intended to use all of the bought assets as its initial capital for a cafe chain under a new brand name.

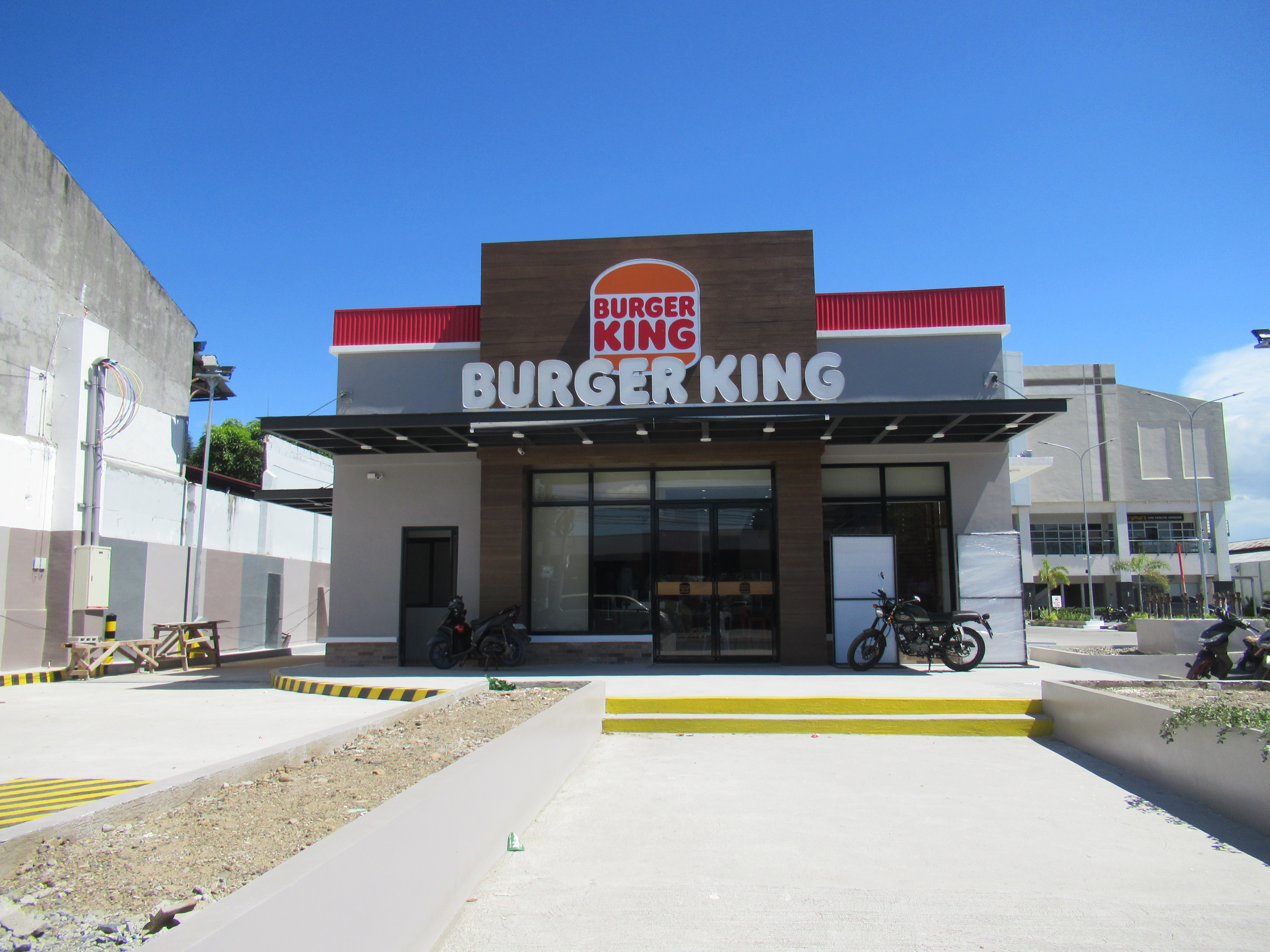
A Burger King outlet in Baliwag, Bulacan

In October 2011, the company acquired a 54% stake in BK Titans, Inc., the sole franchisee of Burger King in the Philippines.

On September 27, 2018, the company announced its 50-50 joint venture with Chinese-American restaurant chain, Panda Express to bring its stores to the Philippines. On July 8, 2019, both JFC and Panda Express' parent company, Panda Restaurant Group formed their joint venture company, JBPX Foods, Inc. after its incorporation by the Securities and Exchange Commission.

On February 16, 2021, the company announced that it entered into a 50-50 joint venture with Yoshinoya International Philippines to establish a company that would serve as the franchisee of Yoshinoya in the country, with plans to open 50 stores in the country in the long-term.

On August 4, 2023, the company announced that it entered into a joint venture with Singaporean food service management company Food Collective to open Tiong Bahru Bakery and The Common Man Coffee Roasters in the Philippines. JFC owns 60% and Food Collective 40% of the joint venture. In January 2024, it opened its first Common Man Coffee Roasters outlet at Ayala Triangle Gardens. In January 2025, it opened its first Tiong Bahru Bakery outlet at Verve Residences Tower 2.

== Brands ==
- Jollibee - Filipino-style fast food restaurant with American-influenced dishes specializing in burgers, spaghetti, chicken and some local Filipino dishes and JFC's flagship brand
- Greenwich - Fast food restaurant features a variety of Italian main and side dishes specializing in pizzas and pastas
- Red Ribbon - Bakeshop that offers a wide array of baked goods, specializing in cakes
- Chowking - Fast food restaurant that serves Chinese food, predominantly selling noodle soups, dim sum, and rice bowls with toppings
- Mang Inasal - Fast food restaurant that specializes in Filipino barbecue
- Burger King Philippines - JFC is managing the operations of the American hamburger fast food chain in the Philippines
- Highlands Coffee - One of the top café chains in Vietnam
- Smashburger - American fast-casual hamburger restaurant chain
- Yonghe King - Chinese fast food restaurant that specializes in noodles
- Hong Zhuang Yuan - Chinese fast food chain
- Tortas Frontera - US-based Mexican food restaurant by chef Rick Bayless, JFC owns a 47% stake
- Panda Express Philippines - A joint venture with the Chinese-American fast food restaurant's parent company, Panda Restaurant Group through JBPX Foods, Inc. and JFC operates its Philippine chain while owning a 50% stake
- Yoshinoya Philippines - A joint venture with the Japanese fast food restaurant through Yoshinoya International Philippines, and JFC operates its Philippine chain while owning a 50% share
- Tim Ho Wan - In November 2024, JFC took full ownership of the Michelin-star restaurant
- Milksha - A Taiwan-based bubble tea chain in which JFC owns 51%, Milksha is regarded as Taiwan's “best milk tea” brand
- The Coffee Bean & Tea Leaf - JFC acquired the coffee chain in 2019
- Compose Coffee - A South Korea-based coffee chain in which JFC owns a 70% stake

=== Former brands ===
JFC jointly opened a Philippine branch of Délifrance with master franchisee Delifrance Asia Ltd. The company became the sole franchisee of the bakery chain in the Philippines in 2006 through its subsidiary Fresh N' Famous Foods. The franchise agreement between the company and Délifrance Asia ended on December 31, 2011, and assets of Délifrance in the Philippines were sold to CafeFrance Corp. CafeFrance Corp. intended to use all of the bought assets as its initial capital for a cafe chain under a new brand name.

The company owned Manong Pepe, a food chain patterned after the carinderia until 2011. Initially named Tio Pepe's Karinderia, the now defunct chain was meant to cater to people from the lower classes, particularly those from the socioeconomic class D demographic. JFC discontinued the Manong Pepe business on April 9, 2011.

The company owned PHO24, a Vietnamese noodle chain, from 2018 to 2023. The company sold assets of said chain to East-West Restaurant Concepts, a wholly owned subsidiary of Viet Thai International Joint Stock Co. and instead aimed to focus on growing its new businesses at the time in Tim Ho Wan, Yoshinoya, and Milksha.

In the U.S., the company owned a stake in Jinja Bar Bistro in New Mexico from 2008 to 2016.

In China, the company owned stakes in Shanghai-based Lao Dong and in Taiwan, Taichung-based Chun Shui Tang until 2007 and a stake in San Pin Wang until 2016. In 2022, the company also announced that its subsidiary terminated the master franchise agreement for Dunkin' Donuts, which covers mainland China, Hong Kong, and Macau.

== Joint ventures ==
JFC and the Viet Thai International Joint Stock Company formed a joint venture named Superfoods Group, which owns and manages the Vietnamese coffee chain brand, Highlands Coffee. In November 2016, the two companies agreed to list Superfoods as a public company in a stock exchange by July 2019.

In October 2016, the company and Cargill formed a joint venture, C-Joy Poultry Meats Production, and broke ground on a new poultry processing facility at Santo Tomas, Batangas in the Philippines. The facility will be expected to process 45 million chickens per year.

On September 27, 2018, the company announced its 50-50 joint venture with Chinese-American restaurant chain, Panda Express to bring its stores to the Philippines. On July 8, 2019, both JFC and Panda Express' parent company, Panda Restaurant Group formed their joint venture company, JBPX Foods, Inc. after its incorporation by the Securities and Exchange Commission.

On February 16, 2021, the company announced that it entered into a 50-50 joint venture with Yoshinoya International Philippines to establish a company that would serve as the franchisee of Yoshinoya in the country, with plans to open 50 stores in the country in the long-term.

On August 4, 2023, the company formed a joint venture with Food Collective, Pte. Ltd. (FCPL), with the company owning a 60% stake and FCPL owning a 40% stake, to open Tiong Bahru Bakery and "The Common Man Coffee Roasters" in the Philippines.

In February 2024, the company and Republic Cement signed a Memorandum of understanding to support the Extended producer responsibility Law: on "recovering post-consumer plastic packaging waste, diverting it away from the landfills and waterways, and sending it to Republic Cement for co-processing. Republic Cement will use the collected packaging waste as alternative fuel in the cement manufacturing process." In the same month, the company and First Gen Corporation also signed an agreement to "shift to renewable energy by operating 6,300 solar panels in its Canlubang Baking Facility.

== Controversies ==
=== Labor policy ===
According to the Department of Labor and Employment (DOLE) in May 2018, JFC has the most workers who are employed under a labor-only contracting (LOC) program. They were also accused of unfair labor practices in the United States for at least one branch.
