= Mang Inasal =

Filipino fast food restaurant chain

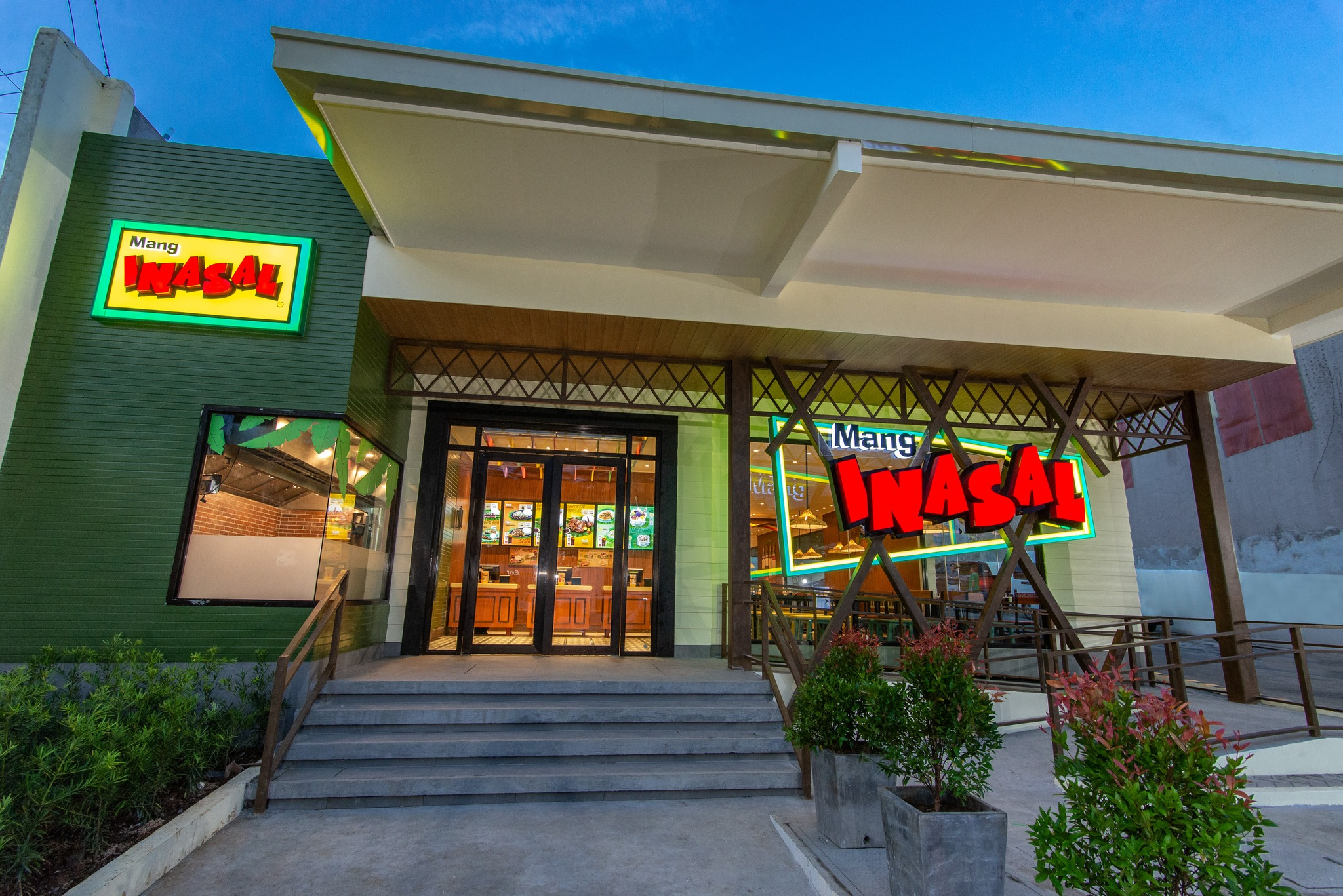
- Mang Inasal branch in Lipa, Batangas
- Type: Subsidiary
- Industry: Restaurants
- Founded: Iloilo City, Philippines (December 12, 2003; 22 years ago)
- Founder: Edgar "Injap" J. Sia II
- Headquarters: Jollibee Plaza, F. Ortigas Jr. Avenue, Ortigas Center, Pasig, Philippines
- Number of locations: 570 (2025)
- Area served: Philippines
- Key people: Tony Tan Caktiong (Chairman); Mike V. Castro (President)
- Products: Filipino cuisine Fast food
- Revenue: ₱12 billion (2015)
- Number of employees: 15,000
- Parent: Jollibee Group (70%)
- Website: manginasal.ph

Mang Inasal (Hiligaynon for "Mr. Barbecue") is a Philippine fast-food restaurant chain owned by Jollibee Foods Corporation. Established in 2003, it specializes in barbecue dishes, and is most known for its chicken inasal (grilled chicken) and unli-rice (unlimited rice).

== History ==
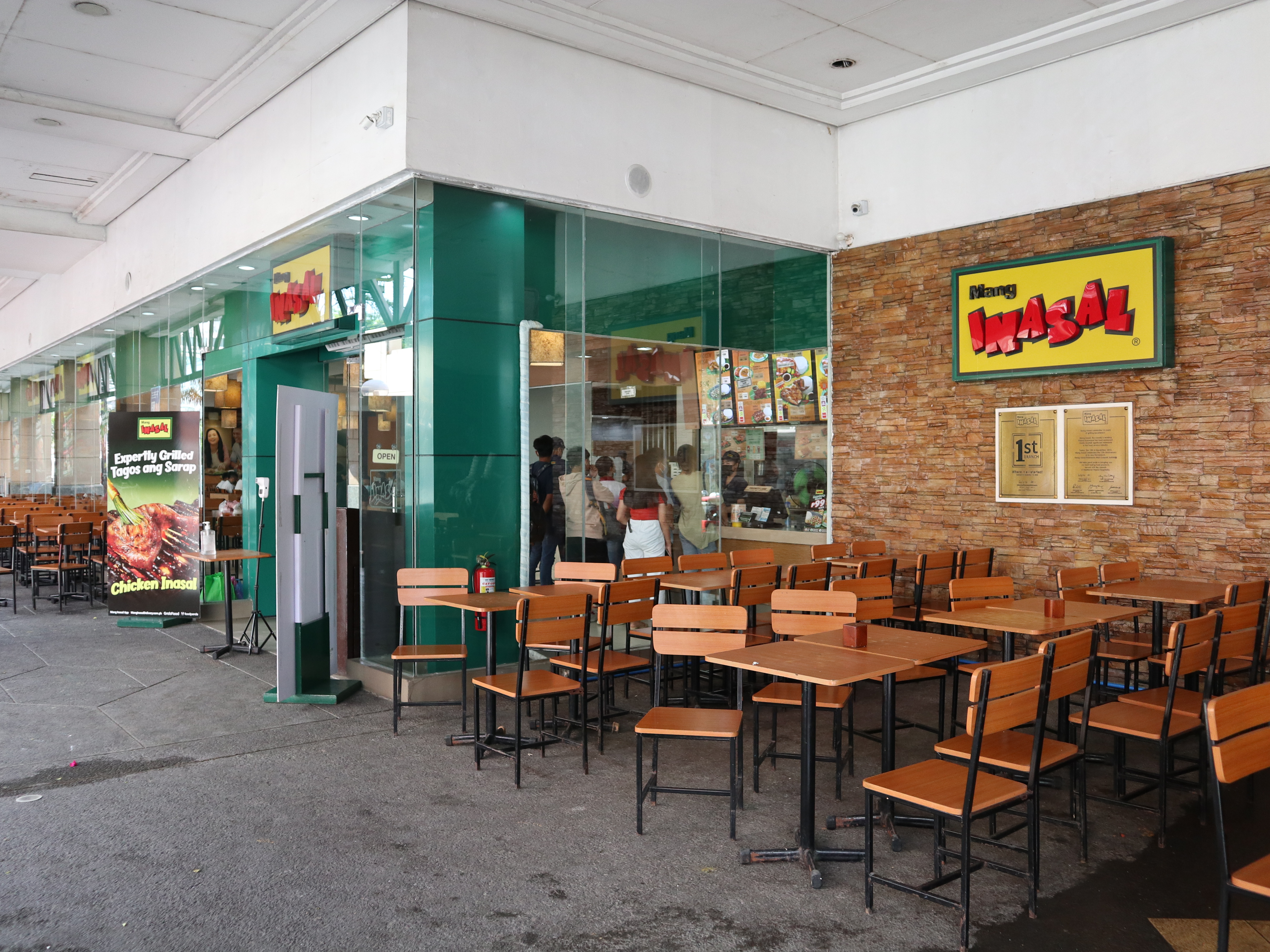
The first Mang Inasal branch at Robinsons Iloilo

Mang Inasal was started by Edgar "Injap" Sia II, who owned his first business at twenty years old. Sia engaged in the food business at 26 years old, opening the first Mang Inasal branch on December 12, 2003, at the Carpark Building of Robinsons Place Iloilo in downtown Iloilo City. The restaurant was an instant success despite stiff competition from other established grilled-food restaurants.

Mang Inasal opened its first branches in the Visayas region, later expanding to Mindanao then to Metro Manila. The company started franchising in 2005; by 2008, it had opened 23 restaurants, with ten being franchised. In 2009, Mang Inasal expanded to over a hundred branches, opening its 100th branch in Kalibo, Aklan.

In October 2010, 70% of Mang Inasal was acquired by Jollibee Foods Corporation (JFC), for ₱3 billion ($68.8 million). JFC acquired in April 2016 the remaining 30% previously belonging to Injap Investment, Inc. owned by Sia. The Sia family remains involved in the business with Ferdinand Sia as its COO.

In 2018, Mang Inasal opened its 500th branch in Mandurriao, Iloilo City. The first drive-thru branch opened on December 11, 2024, in Santa Maria, Bulacan. On August 31, 2025, Mang Inasal’s first and flagship branch in Robinsons Iloilo, reopened after renovations, introducing a fifth-generation store design, a dedicated take-out counter, its first cashless ordering kiosk, and a Mang Inasal Heritage Wall.

== Products ==
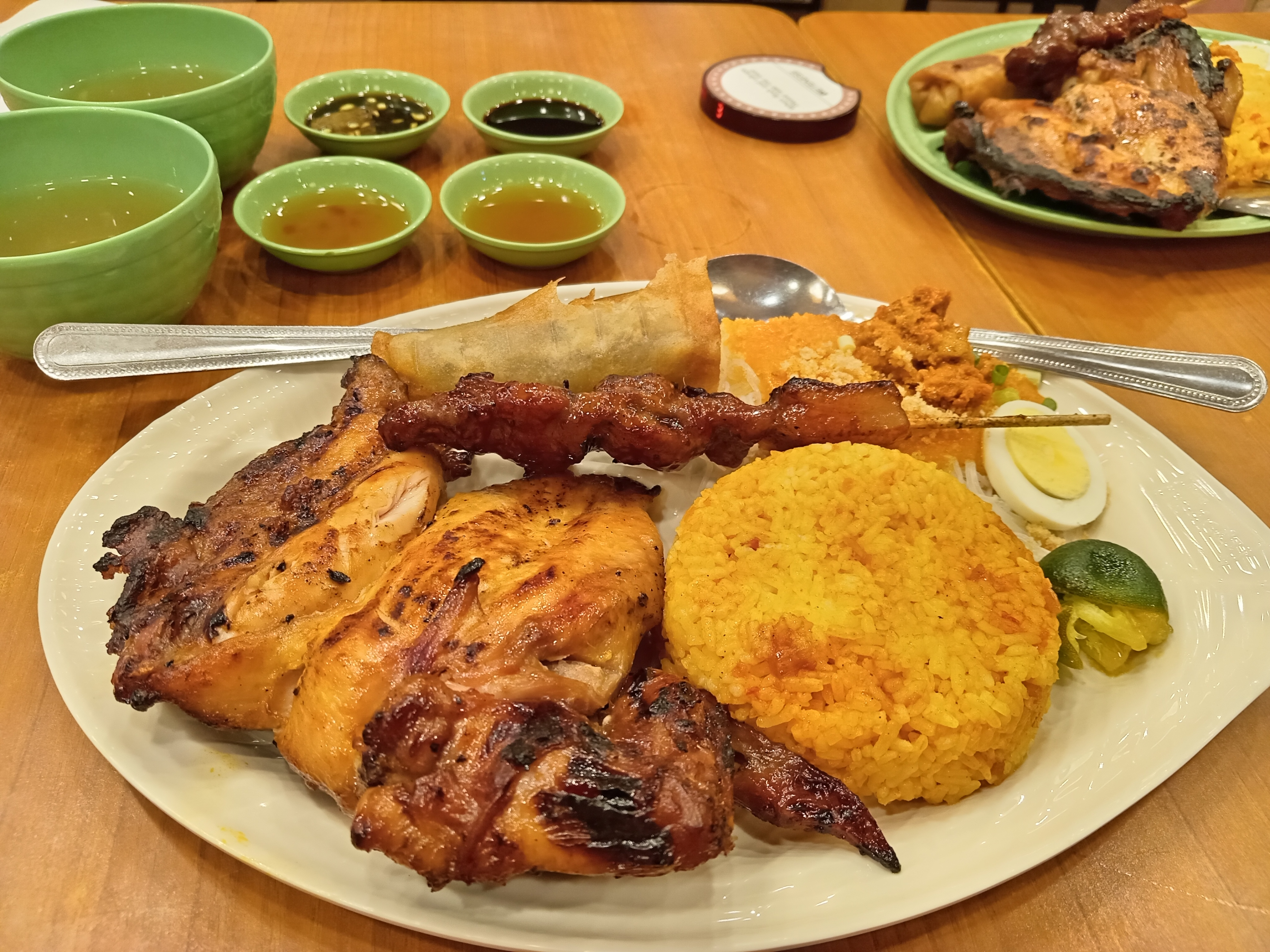
'Solo Fiesta' meal with chicken inasal pecho, pork barbecue, palabok, lumpiang togue, java rice, and soup

Mang Inasal specializes in Filipino grilled chicken, particularly its signature chicken inasal, which is marinated and grilled. The menu includes options for "unli-rice" or unlimited rice, allowing customers to request additional servings. The restaurant chain also offers free Sinigang, along with other grilled dishes like pork barbecue and liempo, as well as non-grilled options like sisig, palabok, and lumpia plus condiments like soy sauce, vinegar and chicken oil. For dessert, they offer halo-halo and crema de leche.

== Marketing and advertising ==
Love team "Mathon"—Maris Racal and Anthony Jennings—are appointed endorsers of Mang Inasal Pork barbecue.

Actor Coco Martin is also a long-time endorser of Mang Inasal.

=== Awards ===
Mang Inasal won two Golds, one Silver, and one Bronze awards at the 21st International Business Awards in Istanbul, Turkey.
