= Yonghe King =

Chinese fast food restaurant chain

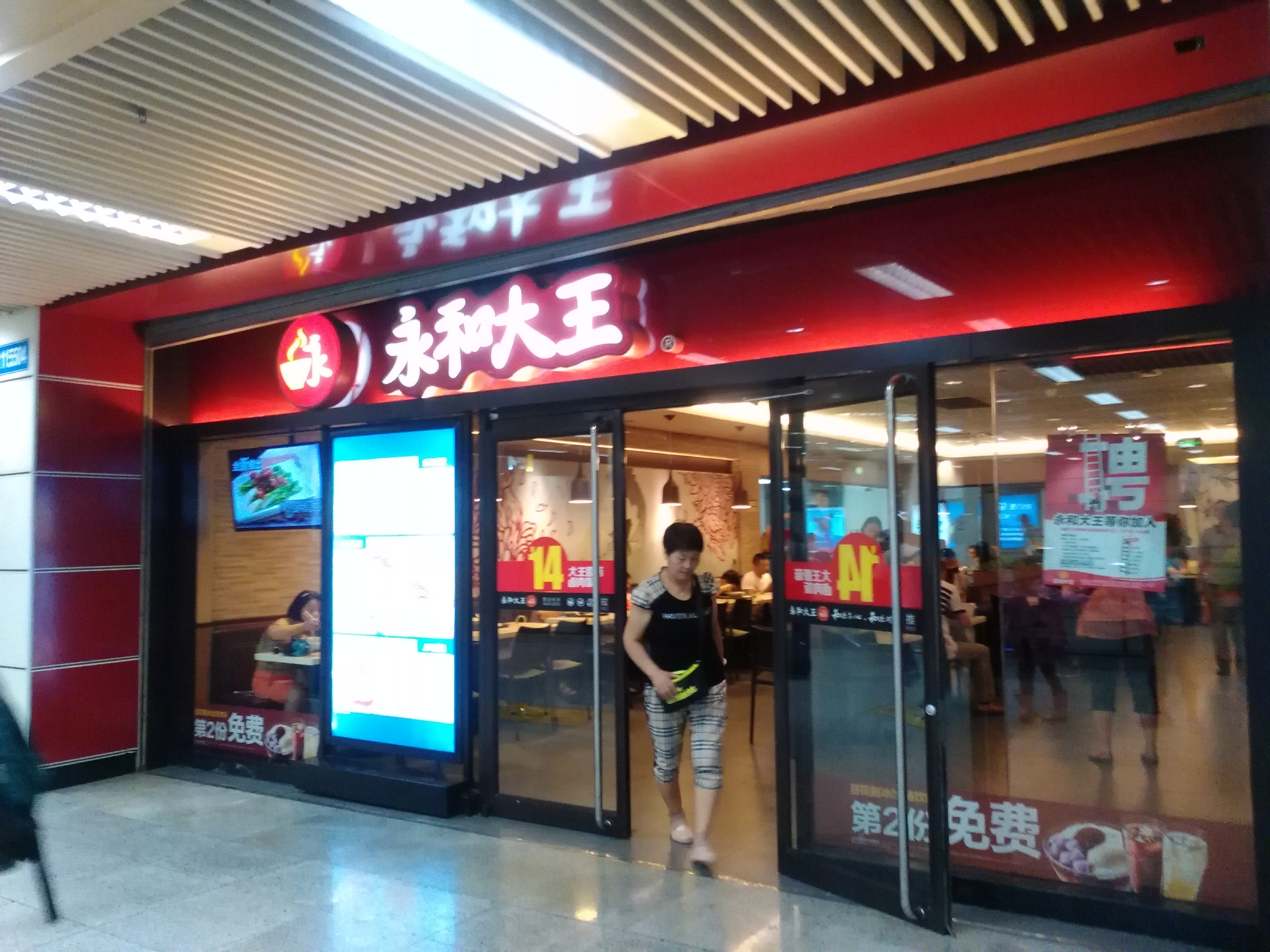
A Yonghe King in Shanghai

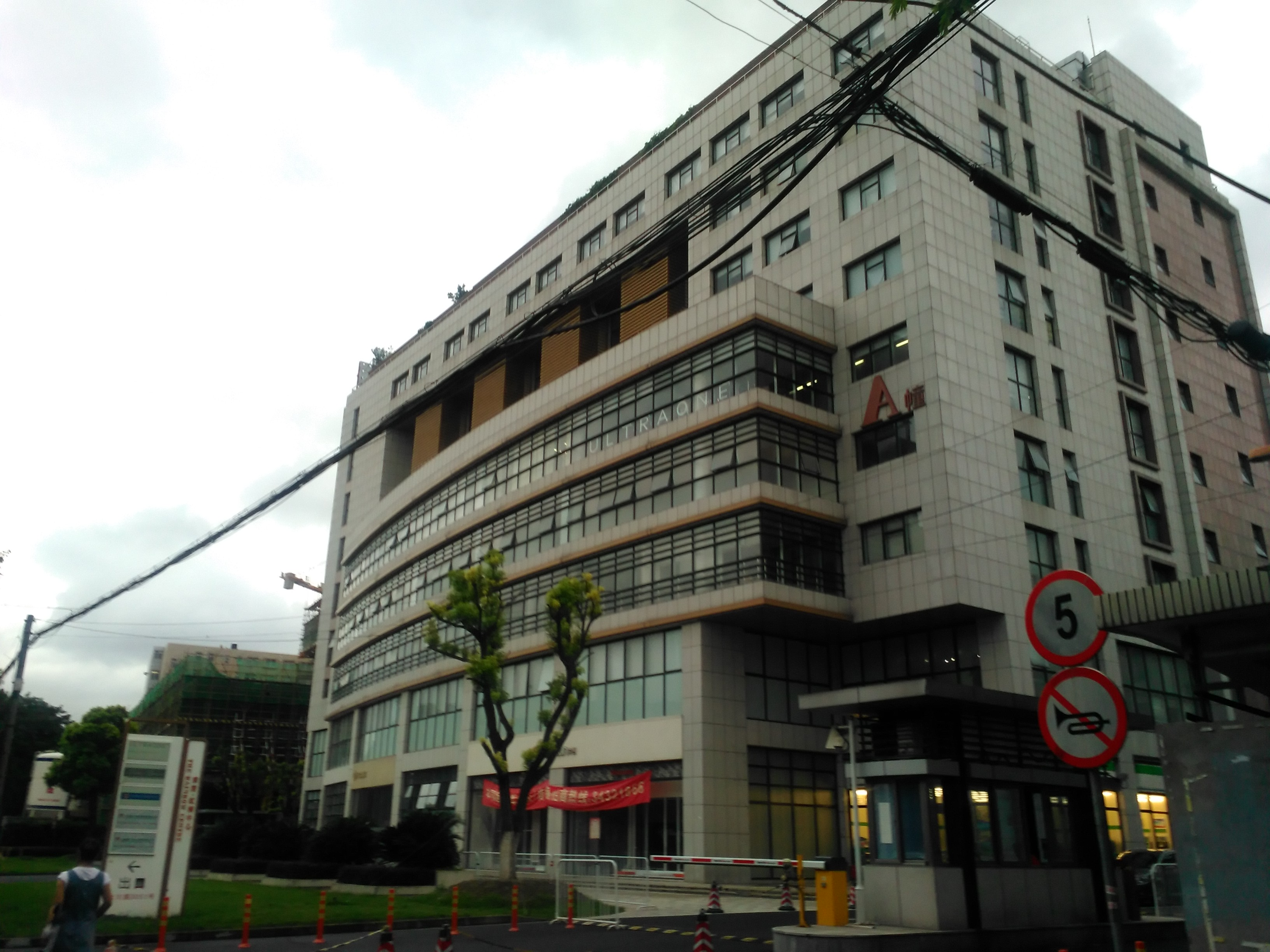
The Rainbow Hongqiao Centre includes the company headquarters.

Yonghe King (Chinese: 永和大王; pinyin: Yǒnghé Dàwáng) is a Chinese fast-food restaurant that specializes in noodles. The headquarters are on the fourth floor of Building B of the Rainbow Hongqiao Centre (莱茵虹桥中心) in Minhang District, Shanghai.

Yonghe Dawang opened its first restaurant in Shanghai on December 12, 1995. Today Yonghe has branches throughout China, with over 70 restaurants in major Chinese cities including Shanghai, Beijing, Shenzhen, Hangzhou, Jinan, and Suzhou. In 2004, Yonghe King was bought by one of the largest fast-food conglomerate in the Philippines Jollibee Foods Corporation, which is owned by Chinese Filipino Mr. Tony Tan Caktiong.

The original logo of the chain was that of a smiling face against a red background, which was strikingly similar to the Colonel Sanders logo used by KFC. The Associated Press stated that the former logo was "a smiling, grandfatherly Chinese man". In 2005 the chain changed its logo to that of a steaming bowl of soup.

Other Chinese restaurant chains also use the word "Yonghe" in their titles, including Yonghe Dou-jiang (Chinese word for Soy milk), a famous breakfast orientated Soy Milk chain from Taiwan.
