= Edgar Sia =

Filipino billionaire and businessman

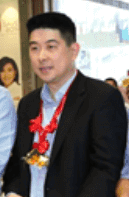
- Born: Edgar Jaruda Sia II; 9 January 1977 (age 49); Iloilo City, Philippines
- Education: University of San Agustin
- Occupation: Property developer
- Known for: Founder of Mang Inasal
- Spouse: Shella Sia
- Children: 3

Edgar "Injap" Jaruda Sia II (born 9 January 1977) is a Filipino businessman. He is the chairman of DoubleDragon Properties (a joint business venture with Tony Tan Caktiong), and the founder of the Mang Inasal fast food restaurant chain.

In 2011, Sia became the youngest billionaire in the Philippines at the age of 34 after selling his 70% stake in Mang Inasal to Jollibee. As of September 2021, his net worth was estimated at US$675 million.

== Early life ==
Sia was born in Iloilo City in 1977 and grew up in Roxas City, the eldest of three siblings having parents from both Capiz and Iloilo. He was nicknamed "Injap", a portmanteau of "Intsik" (the Filipino/Tagalog term for Chinese) and "Japanese"; as his father, Edgar Sr., is a Chinese Filipino, while his mother, the former Pacita Jaruda, is a Japanese Filipina (Japanese surname Haruda, 春田).

Sia had planned to become an architect, but dropped out of the University of San Agustin to start a business.

== Career ==
Sia co-founded the barbecue chain Mang Inasal in Iloilo City in 2003. In seven years, Mang Inasal grew to 338 branches nationwide, before being acquired by Jollibee in 2010.

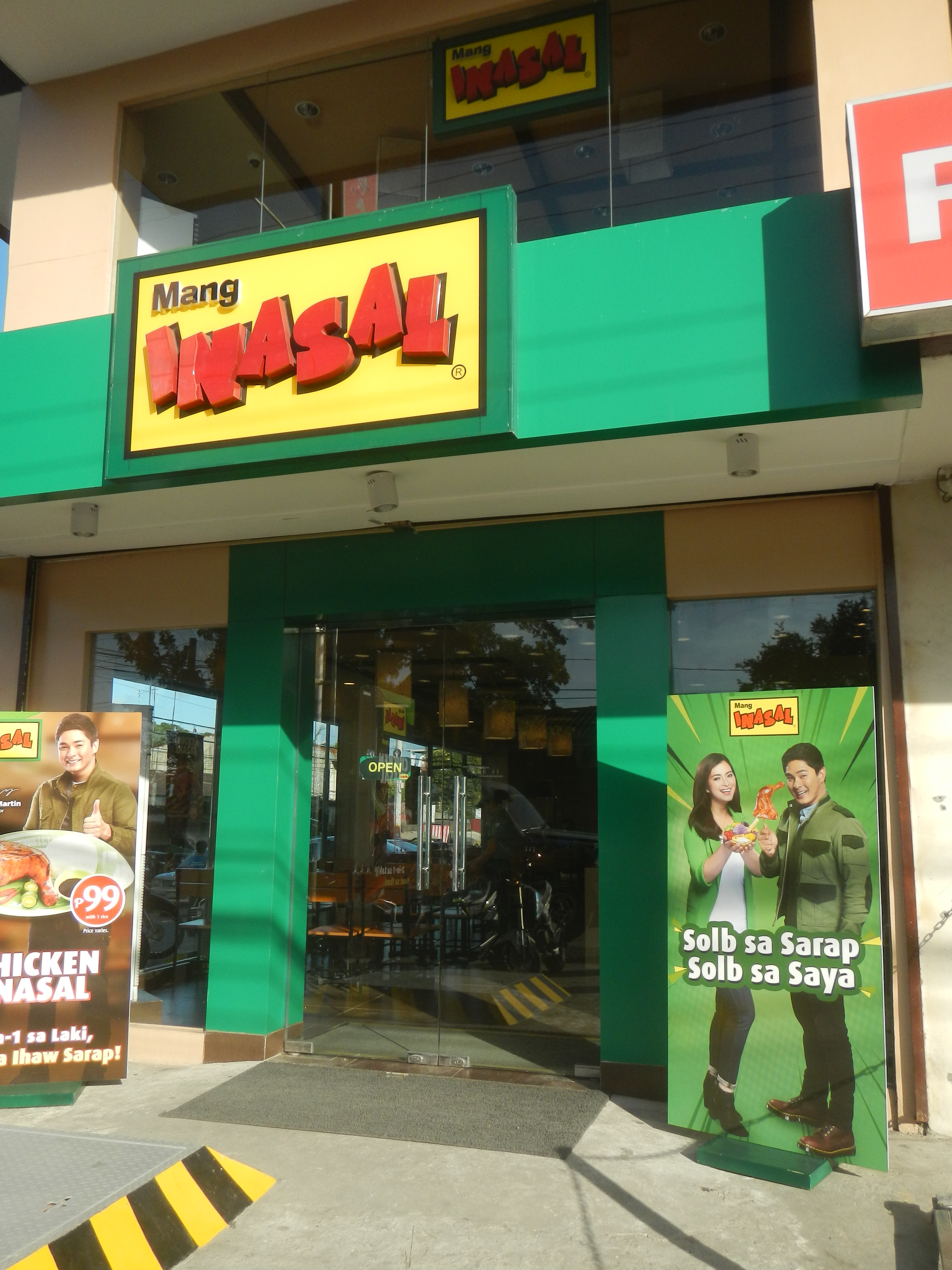
Mang Inasal at Bulacan

In 2009, Sia founded Injap Land Corporation (now DoubleDragon Properties Corporation), developer of CityMall chain of malls.

In 2014, DoubleDragon Properties became a public company. DoubleDragon has been developing commercial and residential properties and reportedly plans to build 100 malls by 2020.

In August 2016, the company announced it was acquiring a majority stake in Hotel of Asia, Inc.

== Personal life ==
Edgar Sia is married to Shella Sia, and they have three children: Edgar Sia III, John Henry Sia and Elisa Stephanie Sia. They live in Manila, Philippines but still maintain homes in Capiz and Iloilo.
