= Tim Ho Wan =

Hong Kong restaurant chain

Tim Ho Wan, the Dim-Sum Specialists 添好運點心專門店

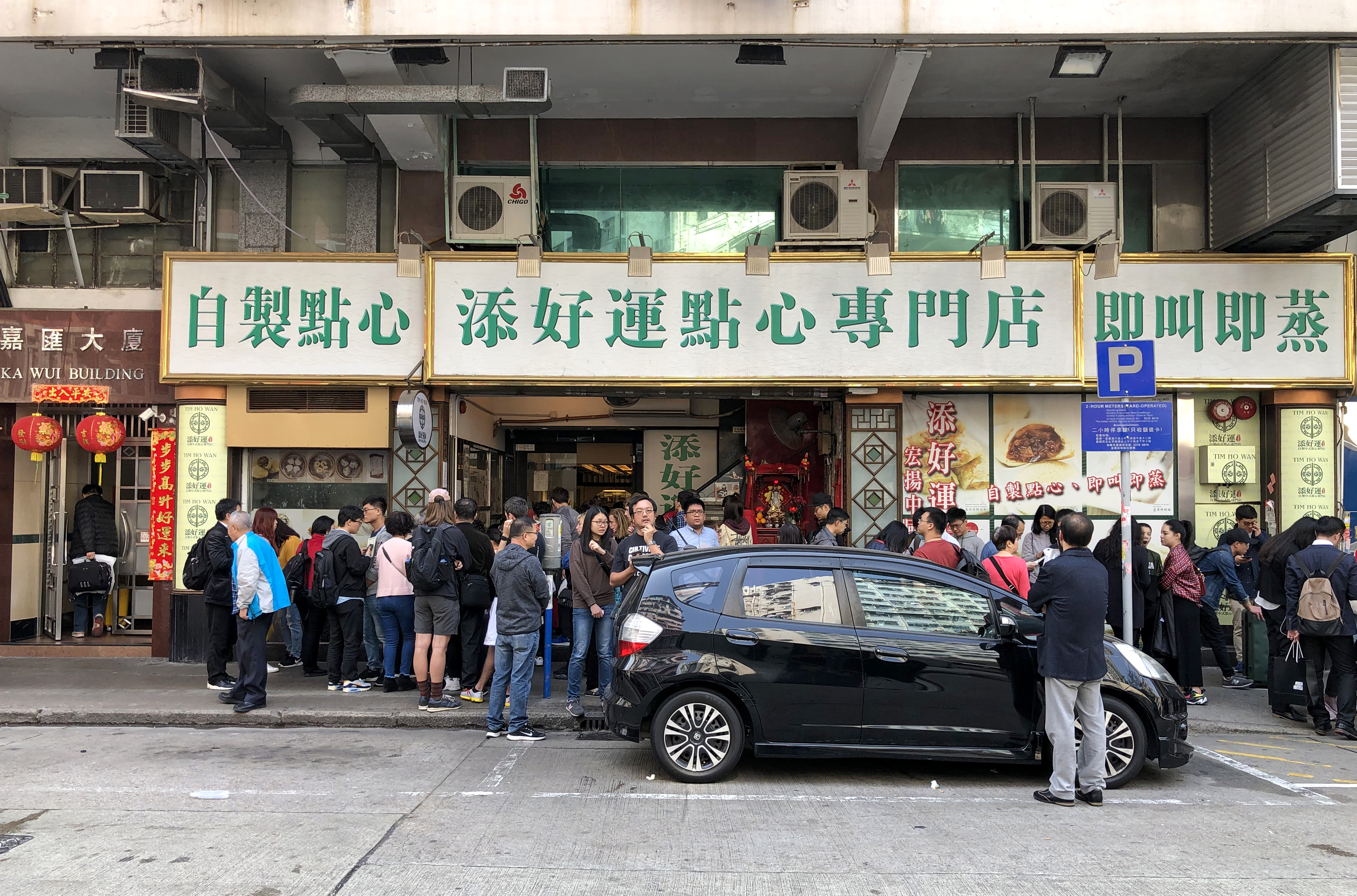
- Tim Ho Wan Sham Shui Po branch
- Genre: Chinese cuisine (Hong Kong); Dim sum
- Founded: March 2009; 17 years ago
- Founders: Mak Kwai-pui; Leung Fai-keung
- Area served: Asia-Pacific
- Owner: Jollibee Group
- Website: http://www.timhowan.com.hk

Chinese name
- Traditional Chinese: 添好運
- Simplified Chinese: 添好运
Transcriptions
Standard Mandarin
- Hanyu Pinyin: Tiān Hǎo Yùn
Yue: Cantonese
- Jyutping: Tim^{1} Hou^{2} Wan^{6}

Tim Ho Wan (Chinese: 添好運) is a Hong Kong dim sum restaurant chain. Known previously for being "the world's cheapest Michelin-star restaurant", the chain has since expanded and now has franchises in 12 countries.

== History ==
Tim Ho Wan was founded in March 2009 by Mak Kwai-pui (a former chef at three Michelin star restaurant Lung King Heen) and Leung Fai-keung, with their first location being a 20-seater restaurant in Mong Kok. Mak had stated that, "the food scene in Hong Kong globalized and I saw less and less authentic Cantonese food", and that by opening Tim Ho Wan he wanted to "keep the tradition alive at an affordable price". The name Tim Ho Wan means "to add good luck".

Within a year of opening, the original Tim Ho Wan in Mong Kok gained a Michelin star.

=== Local expansion ===
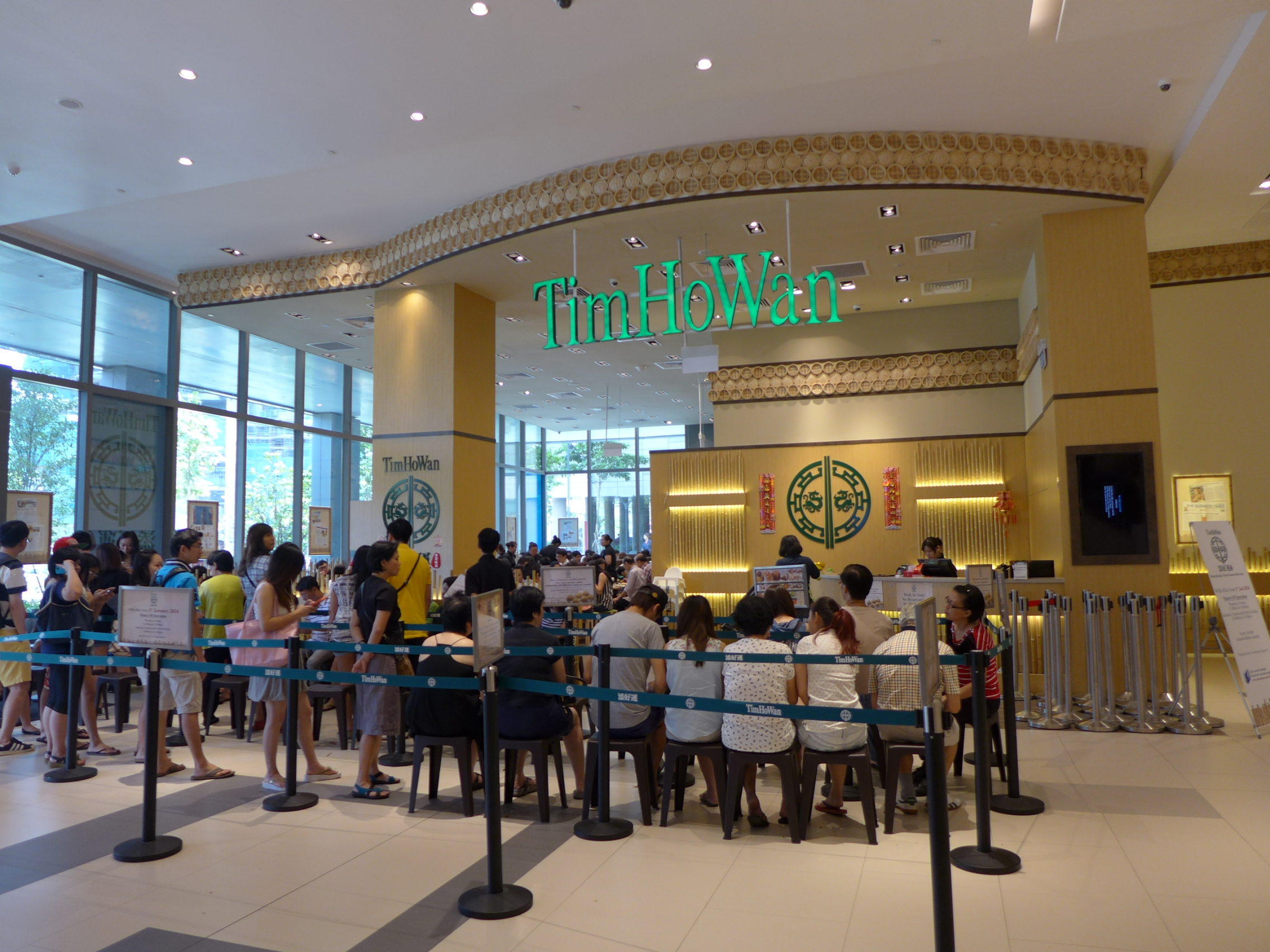
A Tim Ho Wan outlet in Westgate shopping mall in Singapore

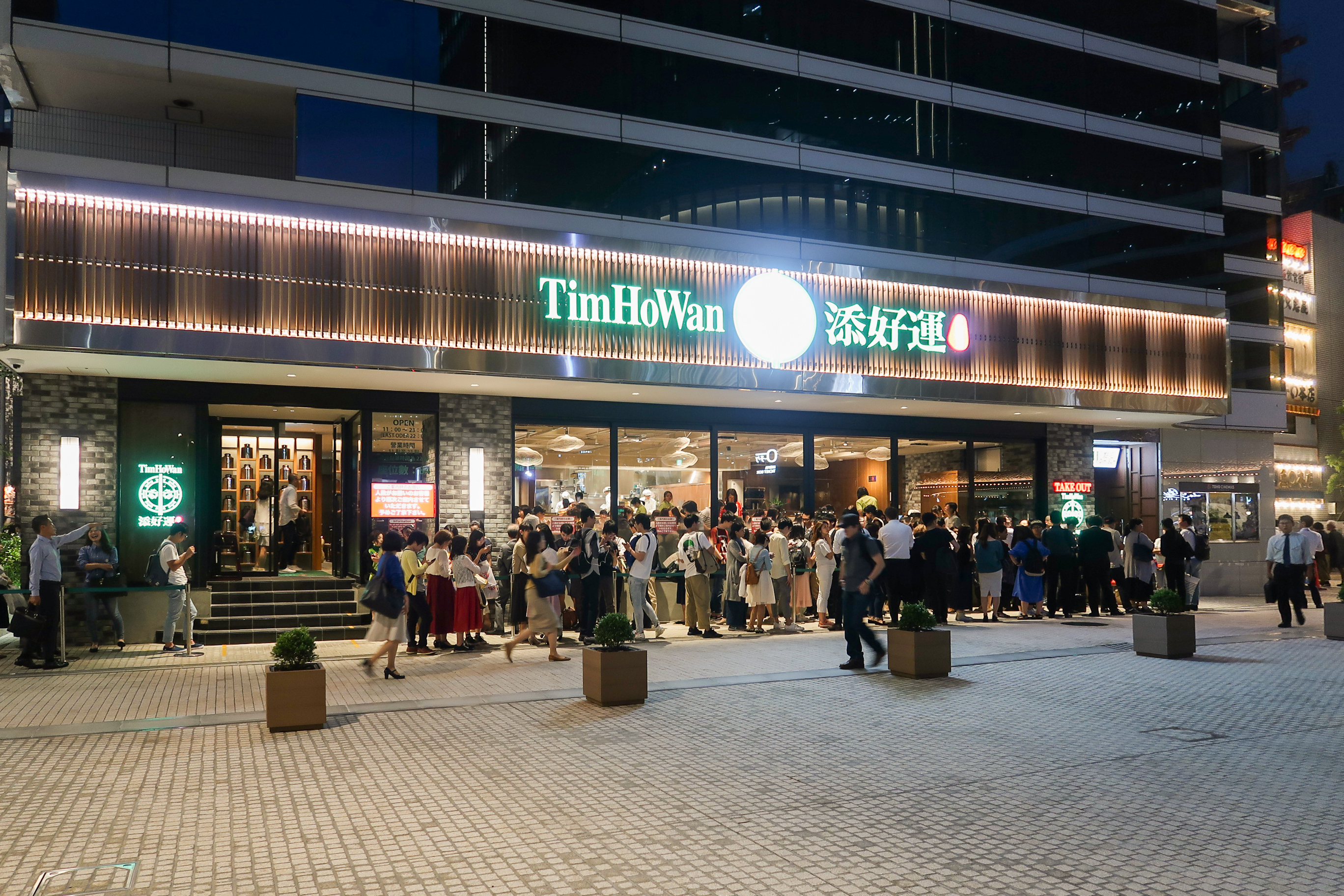
A Tim Ho Wan outlet in Hibiya, Tokyo

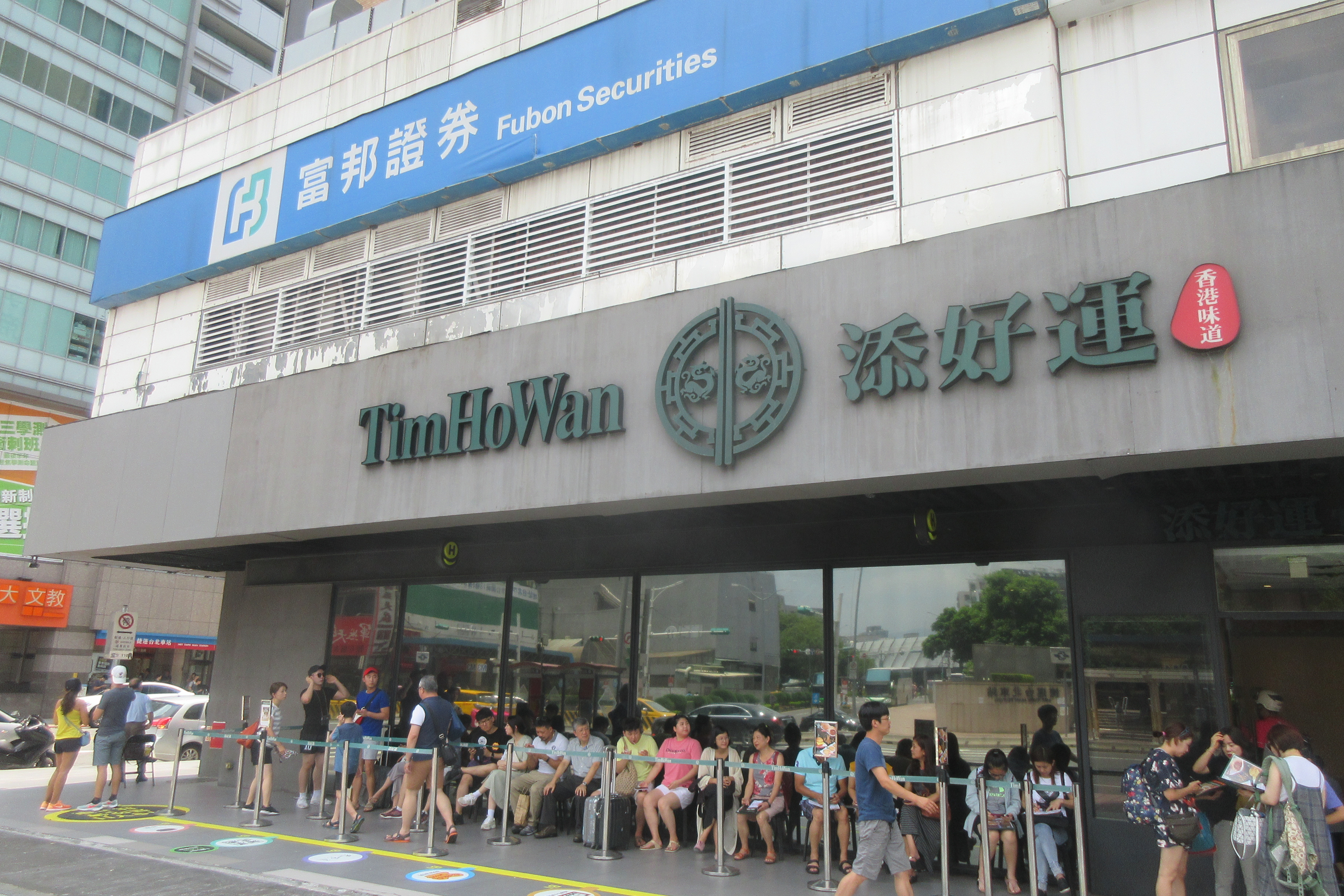
A Tim Ho Wan outlet in Taipei, located across the Taipei Main Station

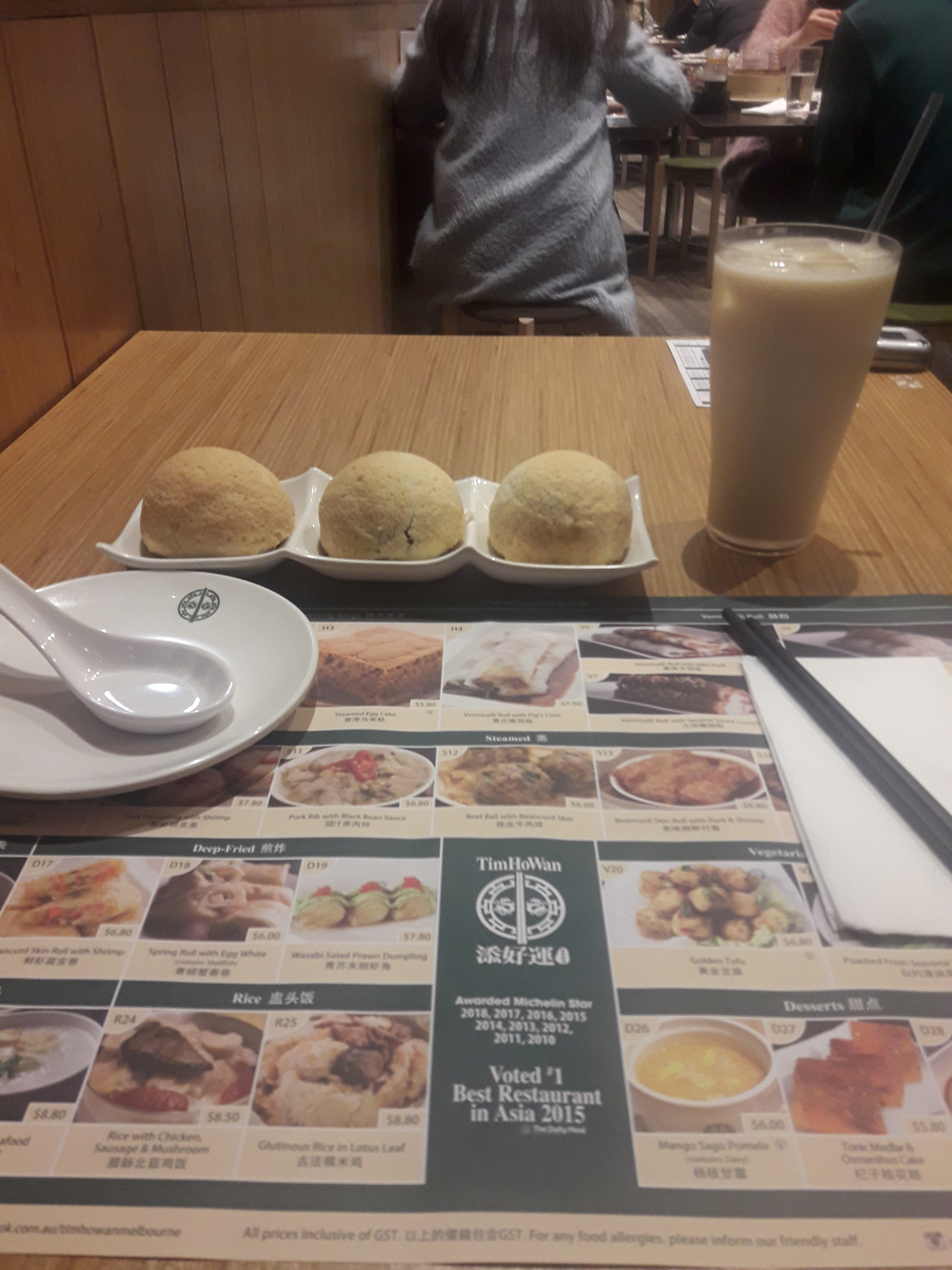
Inside Tim Ho Wan in Melbourne, Australia.

The original Mong Kok location relocated to Olympian City in 2013. The chain has seven additional branches in Hong Kong. They are located in Central, North Point, Taikoo Shing, Tseung Kwan O, Sha Tin, Shum Shui Po, and West Kowloon Station.

=== International expansion ===
The first international outlet was opened in 2013 at Plaza Singapura in Singapore. Tim Ho Wan then expanded to other countries such as Japan, China, South Korea, the Philippines and the United States.

Due to mall redevelopment, its first international outlet at Plaza Singapura will close after 12 July 2026.

== Franchise ==
The Tim Ho Wan Group was owned by Mak and Leung (50% equity holding each), and the group owns all branches in Hong Kong. The Group also collects fees by franchising out their brand globally; all Tim Ho Wan head chefs at these franchised locations must be experienced dim sum chefs, and go through a mandatory 4-week training session in Hong Kong.

=== Ownership ===
The Asia-Pacific franchise rights was held by Tim Ho Wan Private Limited and includes 39 branches in 9 Asia-Pacific markets (excluding Hong Kong, as Tim Ho Wan Group had previovusly retained direct control of their Hong Kong branches). The franchise rights in the United States and Japan was held by Japanese dining group WDI Group. They had operated 8 branches, with 2 in Tokyo, 2 in New York City, 1 in Irvine, California, 1 in Las Vegas, 1 in Honolulu and 1 in Katy, Texas. The master franchise rights for Asia-Pacific were acquired in 2018 by Jollibee Group for approximately US$33 million; the group took full ownership of the entire company in 2024.
