= Hotel 101 Resort – Boracay =

Proposed hotel in Boracay, Philippines

- Alternative names: Hotel 101 Boracay

General information
- Status: Proposed
- Location: Malay, Aklan, Philippines, Boracay Newcoast, Boracay

Other information
- Number of rooms: 1,001

Hotel 101 Resort – Boracay is a proposed 1,001-room hotel in Boracay in Malay, Aklan, Philippines.

== Background ==
On February 1, 2018, DoubleDragon Properties announced that it would build its fourth hotel under its Hotel 101 brand, named Hotel 101 Resorts-Boracay. It will be a joint venture between DoubleDragon subsidiary Hotel of Asia Inc. and partner Newcoast South Beach Inc. The proposed hotel with 1,001 rooms is envisioned to be the biggest in the country in terms of room count. It will be built at the 150 hectares (370 acres) Boracay Newcoast development of Megaworld subsidiary Global-Estate Resorts, Inc.

The hotel will be equipped with a rainwater harvesting system and is expected to be a LEED (Leadership in Energy and Environment Design) certified development. The developers are aiming to secure a LEED certification for the hotel, which is planned to have a rainwater harvesting system and be partially powered by solar panels. In November 2019, it was announced that Barone International was tapped as consultant to help secure LEED certification for the hotel.

Despite plans of the Philippine government to close Boracay for redevelopment, it was announced in March 2018 that plans for the hotel was unaffected which was then still in the planning stages. Boracay was closed by the government from April to October 2018.
