= Greenwich Pizza =

Filipino pizza and pasta restaurant chain

Greenwich

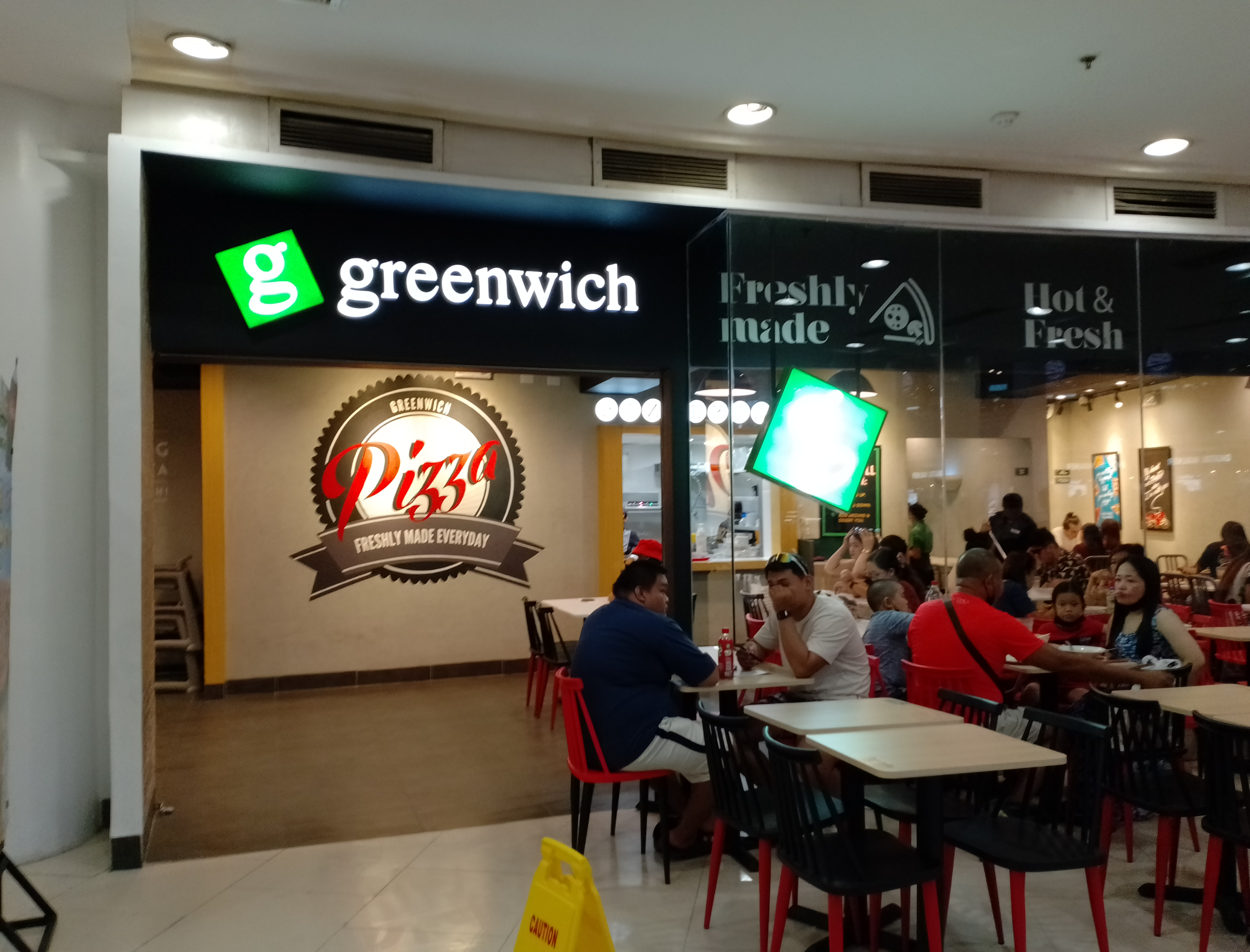
- Greenwich in Ayala Center Cebu
- Product type: Pizza, pasta and Italian food chain
- Current owner: Fresh N' Famous Foods (Jollibee Group)
- Country: Philippines
- Introduced: 1971; 55 years ago
- Related brands: Jollibee; Chowking; Red Ribbon
- Previous owners: Greenwich Pizza Corporation

Greenwich (/ˈɡrinɪtʃ/ GREEN-itch), also known as Greenwich Pizza, is a pizza and pasta chain in the Philippines. It was founded in 1971 by Cresida Tueres.

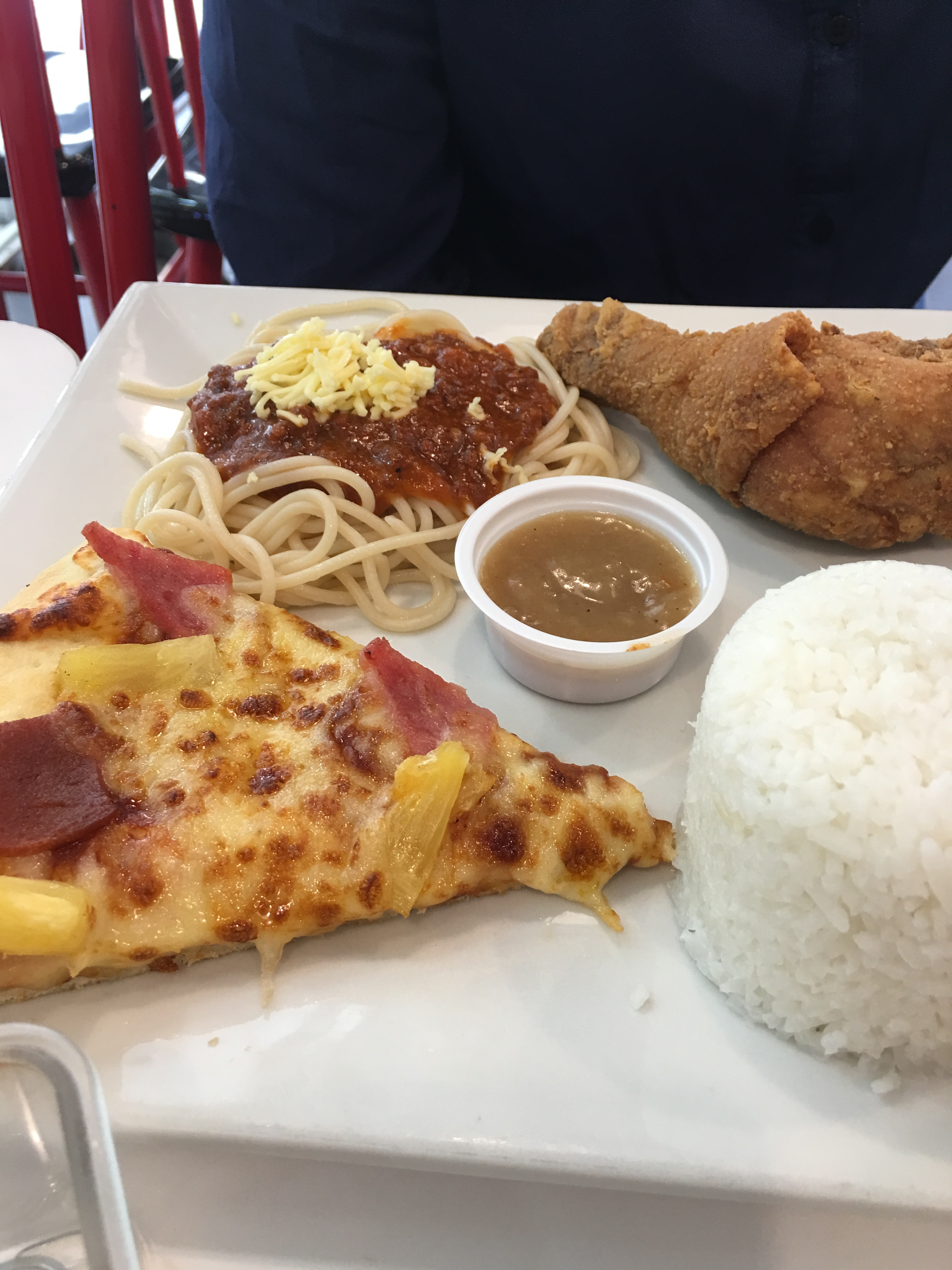
Greenwich Pizza's servings

== History ==
Greenwich Pizza started in 1971 as a small store at Greenhills Shopping Center in San Juan, Rizal (now part of Metro Manila). The name "Greenwich" is in tribute to its founder Cressida Tueres's first customers, which were students from the private school La Salle Green Hills that has green as its school color.

In 1994, Jollibee Group acquired 80% of Greenwich shares. Then, in 2006, Jollibee bought out the remaining shares of its partners in Greenwich for ₱384 million, giving rise to a new company known as the Greenwich Pizza Corporation. The franchise experienced rapid expansion from the original 50 stores in 1994 to over 240 stores with an annual revenue of over ₱4 billion in 2005. Expanding further through 2011, the corporation had opened over 330 stores.

Greenwich Pizza later became a brand managed by Fresh N' Famous Foods, a subsidiary of Jollibee Group.

Under Greenwich President Albert Cuadrante the business was transitioning from a quick-service restaurant to a fast casual diner as of 2017.

== See also ==
- Jollibee Group
