= Tony Tan Caktiong =

Filipino entrepreneur (born 1953)

- 陳覺中
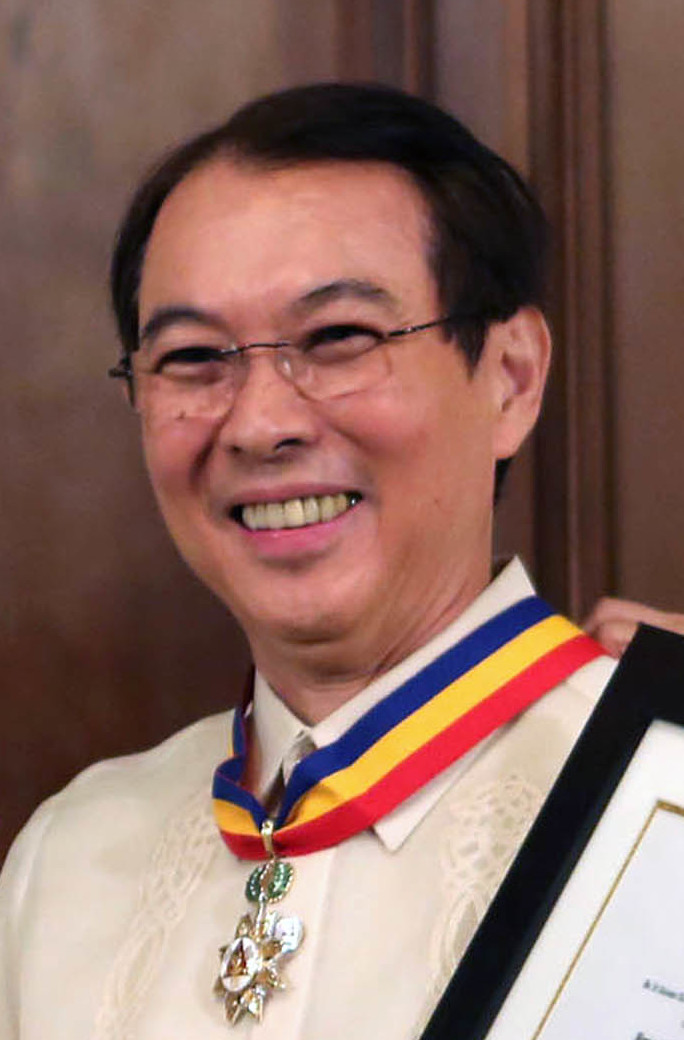
- Tan Caktiong in 2016
- Born: Tony Tan Caktiong; January 5, 1953 (age 73); Davao, Philippines
- Education: University of Santo Tomas (BS)
- Occupation: Businessman
- Known for: Founder and chairman of Jollibee Foods Corporation; Co-chairman of Double Dragon Properties, Corp.
- Spouse: Grace Ang
- Children: 3

Chinese name
- Traditional Chinese: 陳覺中
- Simplified Chinese: 陈觉中
Transcriptions
Standard Mandarin
- Hanyu Pinyin: Chén Juézhōng
Southern Min
- Hokkien POJ: Tân Kak-tiong

Tony Tan Caktiong, CM (simplified Chinese: 陈觉中; traditional Chinese: 陳覺中; pinyin: Chén Juézhōng; Pe̍h-ōe-jī: Tân Kak-tiong; born January 5, 1953) is a Filipino businessman and investor. He is the founder and chairman of Jollibee Foods Corporation, and the co-chairman of DoubleDragon Properties. Forbes listed him as the 14th-richest person in the Philippines in 2026, with an estimated net worth of US$1.1 billion.

== Early career and education ==
Tan Caktiong was born on January 5, 1953, in the then-undivided province of Davao (in now Davao del Sur) to Chinese immigrant parents from Fujian. His father worked in a restaurant in China and as a cook in a Buddhist monastery in Manila before setting up his restaurant in Davao City. Tony Tan Caktiong attended high school at Chiang Kai Shek College and graduated from the University of Santo Tomas with a degree in chemical engineering in 1975. Tan had initially planned his fledgling nascent company to be an ice cream parlor when he founded Jollibee, and then added dishes such as hamburgers, french fries, and fried chicken.

== Career ==
=== Jollibee Foods Corporation ===
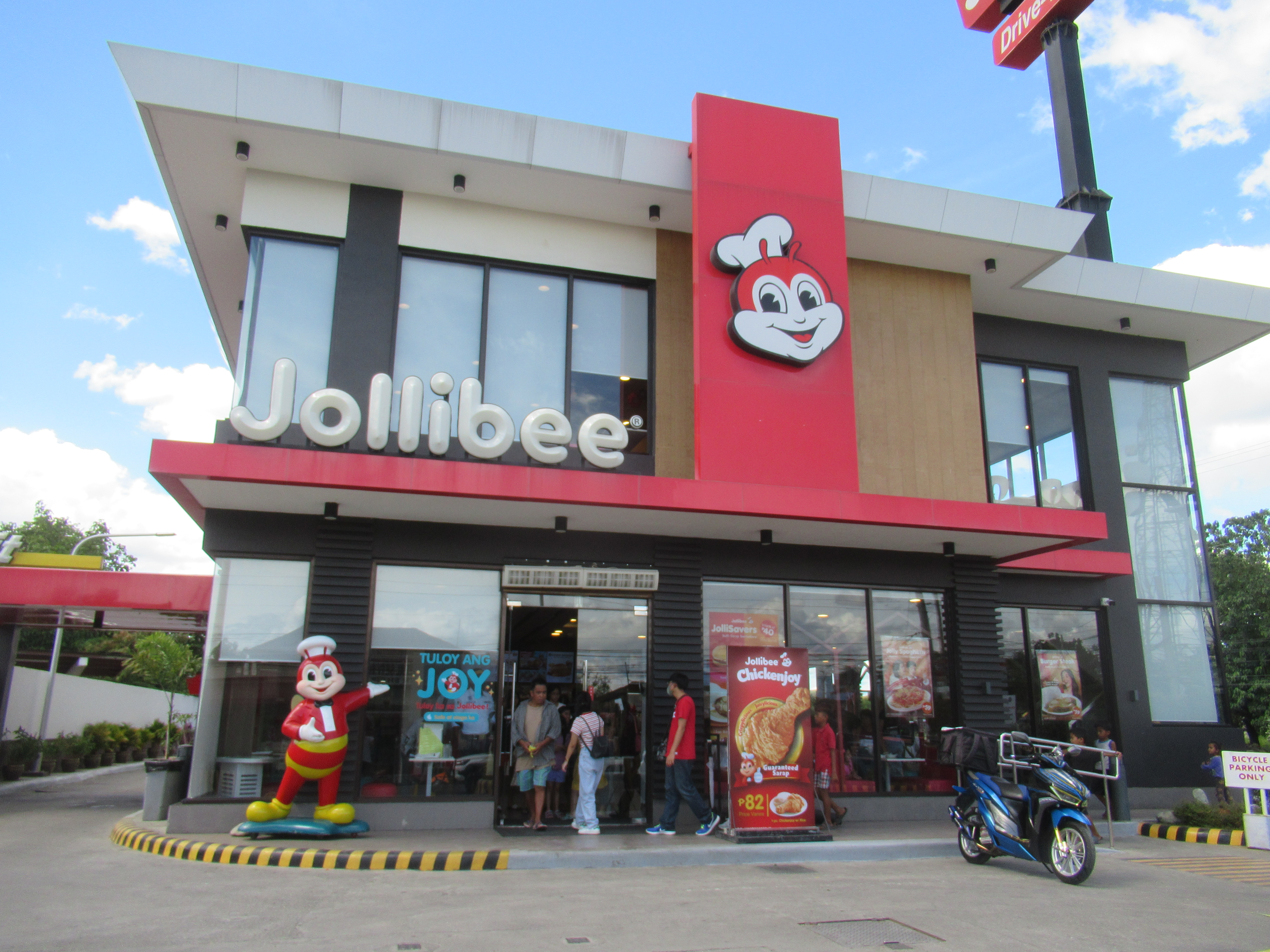
Jollibee at Rizal, Nueva Ecija

Tan Caktiong founded the fast-food chain Jollibee in 1978 after starting it as an ice cream parlor in 1975. Expansion and acquisition of Greenwich Pizza Corp. enabled it to enter the pizza-pasta segment. In early 2006, Jollibee Foods Corporation bought out the remaining shares of its partners in Greenwich Pizza Corporation, equivalent to a 20% stake, for P384 million in cash.

As of August 2008, Tan Caktiong's Jollibee has 1,480 stores worldwide, including Jollibee, Red Ribbon, Chowking, Greenwich, Manong Pepe's and Mang Inasal.

=== DoubleDragon Properties ===
In 2012, Tan Caktiong, through his holding company, Honeystar Holdings Corporation, invested in Injap Land Corporation, a property company founded by Edgar Sia II. With Tan Caktiong's entry, the company was renamed DoubleDragon Properties Corporation.

== Personal life ==
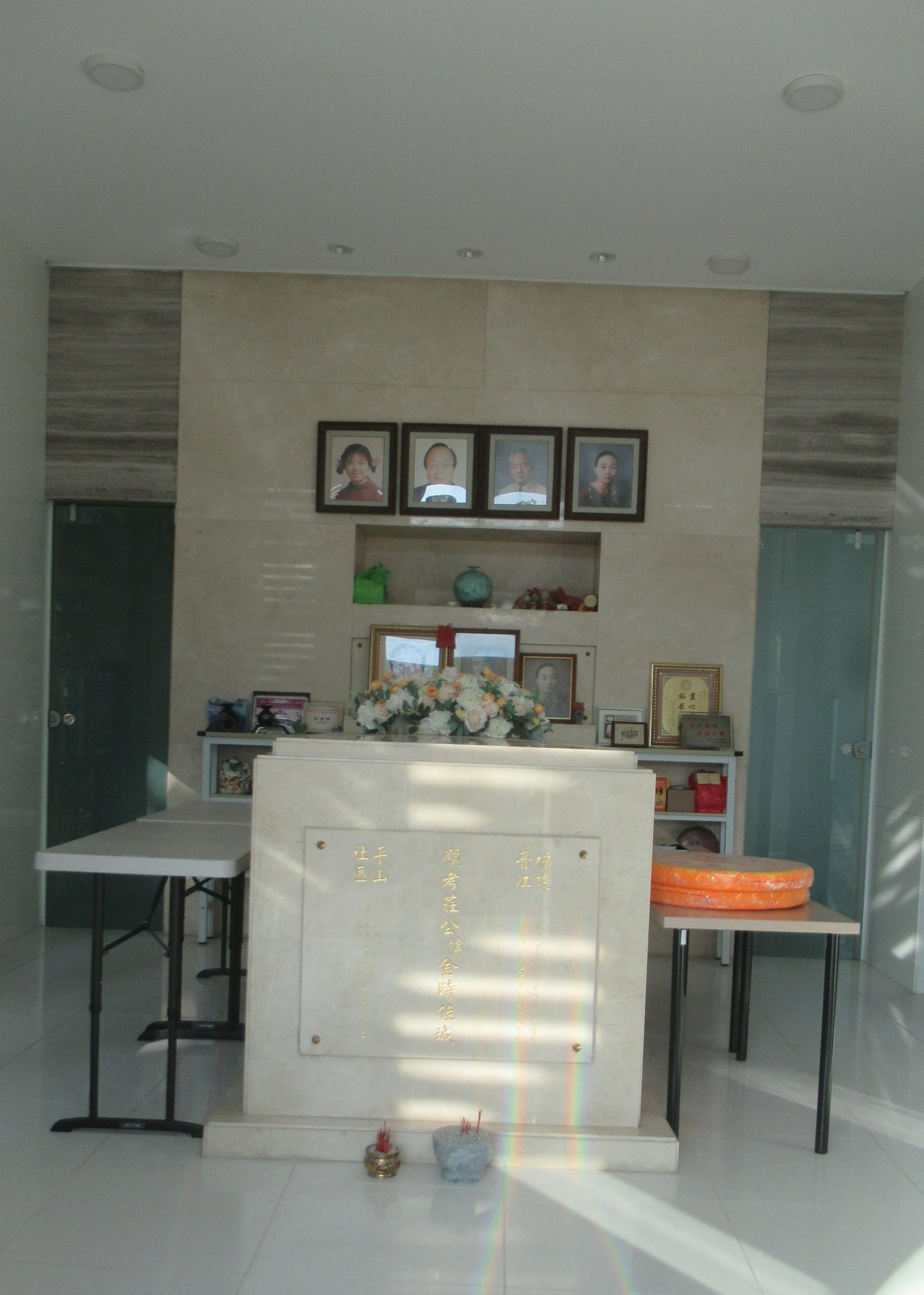
Tan Caktiong's family mausoleum at Manila Memorial Park – Sucat.

Tan Caktiong is married to Grace (née Ang). He has 3 children. He is also the brother of Ernesto Tanmantiong, who is the president and CEO of Jollibee Foods Corporation.

== Awards ==
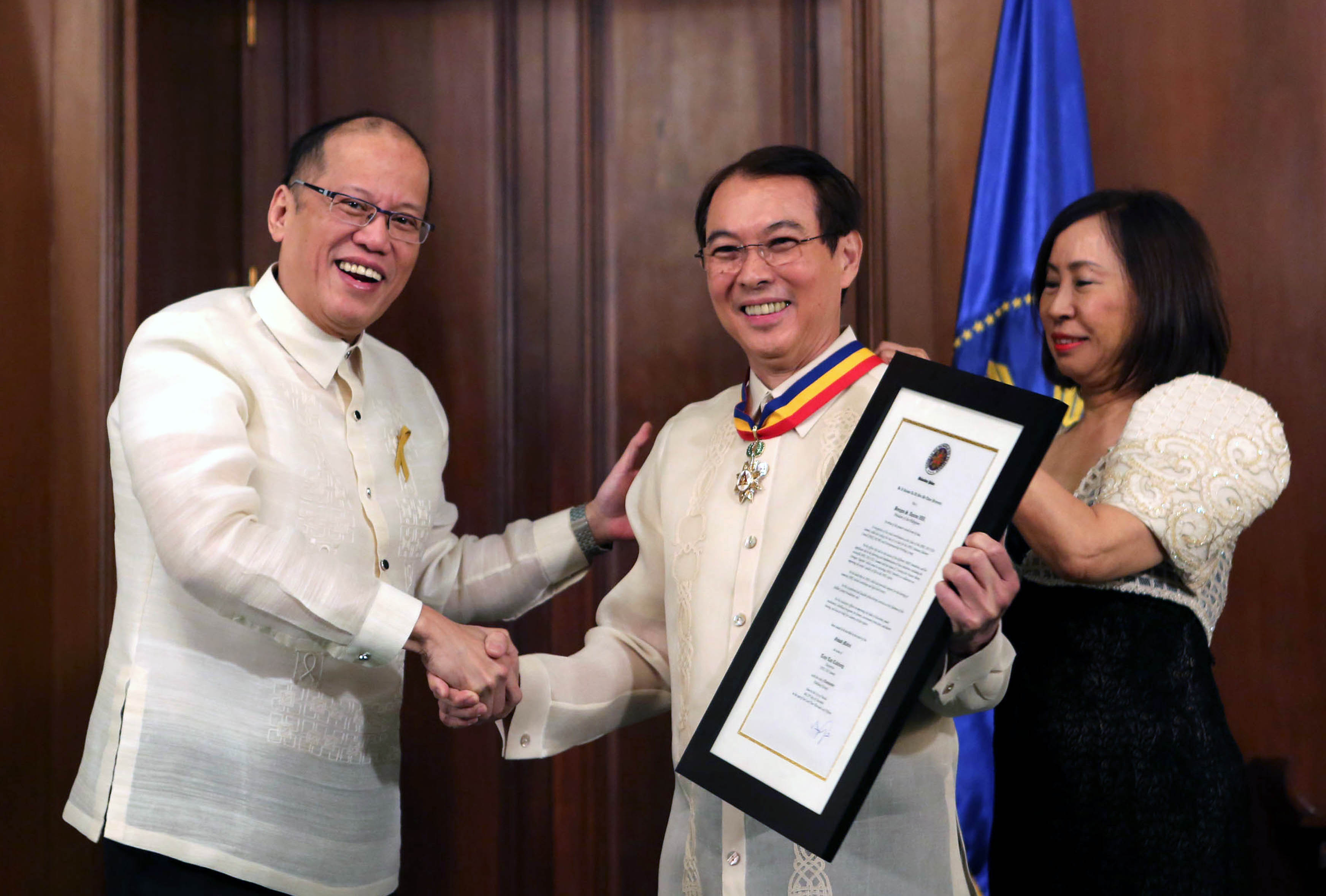
President Benigno S. Aquino III confers the Gawad Mabini with the rank of Commander (Dakilang Kasugo) on APEC CEO Summit chairperson Tony Tan Caktiong in a ceremony at the Music Room of the Malacañan Palace

- Entrepreneur Of The Year Philippines, 2004
- Ernst & Young World Entrepreneur Of The Year, 2004
- Gawad Mabini with the rank of Commander (Dakilang Kasugo),2016
- Honorary doctorate from the University of Santo Tomas, 2018

== See also ==
- Alfonso A. Uy
- Edgar Sia
- Jonha Richman
- Emilio Yap
- George T. Yang
