= Compose Coffee =

South Korean coffeehouse chain

- Type: Subsidiary
- Industry: Restaurants
- Genre: Coffeehouse
- Founded: January 13, 2014; 12 years ago
- Founder: Yang Jae-seok
- Headquarters: Busan, South Korea
- Number of locations: 2,612 (2026)
- Parent: Jollibee Group (2024–present)
- Website: composecoffee.com

Compose Coffee (Korean: 컴포즈커피) is a South Korean coffeehouse chain, with 2,612 coffee shops.

In July 2024, Jollibee Group acquired 70% of Compose Coffee.
