= Yonghe =

Yonghe may refer to:

- Yonghe District (永和區), New Taipei, Taiwan
- Yonghe Dawang (永和大王), Chinese fast-food restaurant that specializes in noodles

== Locations in China ==
- Yonghe County (永和县), Linfen, Shanxi
- Yonghe Subdistrict (永和街道), Luogang District, Guangzhou, Guangdong
- Yonghe Temple (雍和宮), the Panchen Lama's temple in Beijing

=== Towns ===
- Yonghe, Jinjiang, Fujian
- Yonghe Town, Zhengning County, Gansu
- Yonghe, Lianshan County, in Lianshan Zhuang and Yao Autonomous County, Guangdong
- Yonghe, Xingning, Guangdong
- Yonghe, Fenggang County, Guizhou
- Yonghe, Weng'an County, Guizhou
- Yonghe, Jidong County, Heilongjiang
- Yonghe, Liuyang (永和镇), a town of Liuyang City, Hunan
- Yonghe, Ji'an County, Jiangxi
- Yonghe, Leshan, in Jinkouhe District, Leshan, Sichuan
- Yonghe, Shangyu, Zhejiang

=== Townships ===
- Yonghe Township, Hailun (永合乡), Heilongjiang
- Yonghe Township, Zhengning County (永和乡), in Zhengning County, Gansu
- Yonghe Township, Anyang County (永和乡), Henan
- Yonghe Township, Bin County, Heilongjiang (永和乡)
- Yonghe, Hengshan (永和乡), Hengshan County, Hunan.
- Yonghe Township, Jiuzhaigou County (永和乡), in Jiuzhaigou County, Sichuan
- Yonghe Township, Mao County (永和乡), in Mao County, Sichuan
- Yonghe Township, Shimian County (永和乡), in Shimian County, Sichuan

== Historical eras ==
- Yonghe (136–141), era name used by Emperor Shun of Han
- Yonghe (345–346), era name used by Emperor Mu of Jin
- Yonghe (416–417), era name used by Yao Hong, emperor of Later Qin
- Yonghe (935–936), era name used by Wang Yanjun, emperor of Min
- Yonghe (1721), era name used by Zhu Yigui
