= The Coffee Bean & Tea Leaf =

American coffee shop chain

International Coffee & Tea, LLC

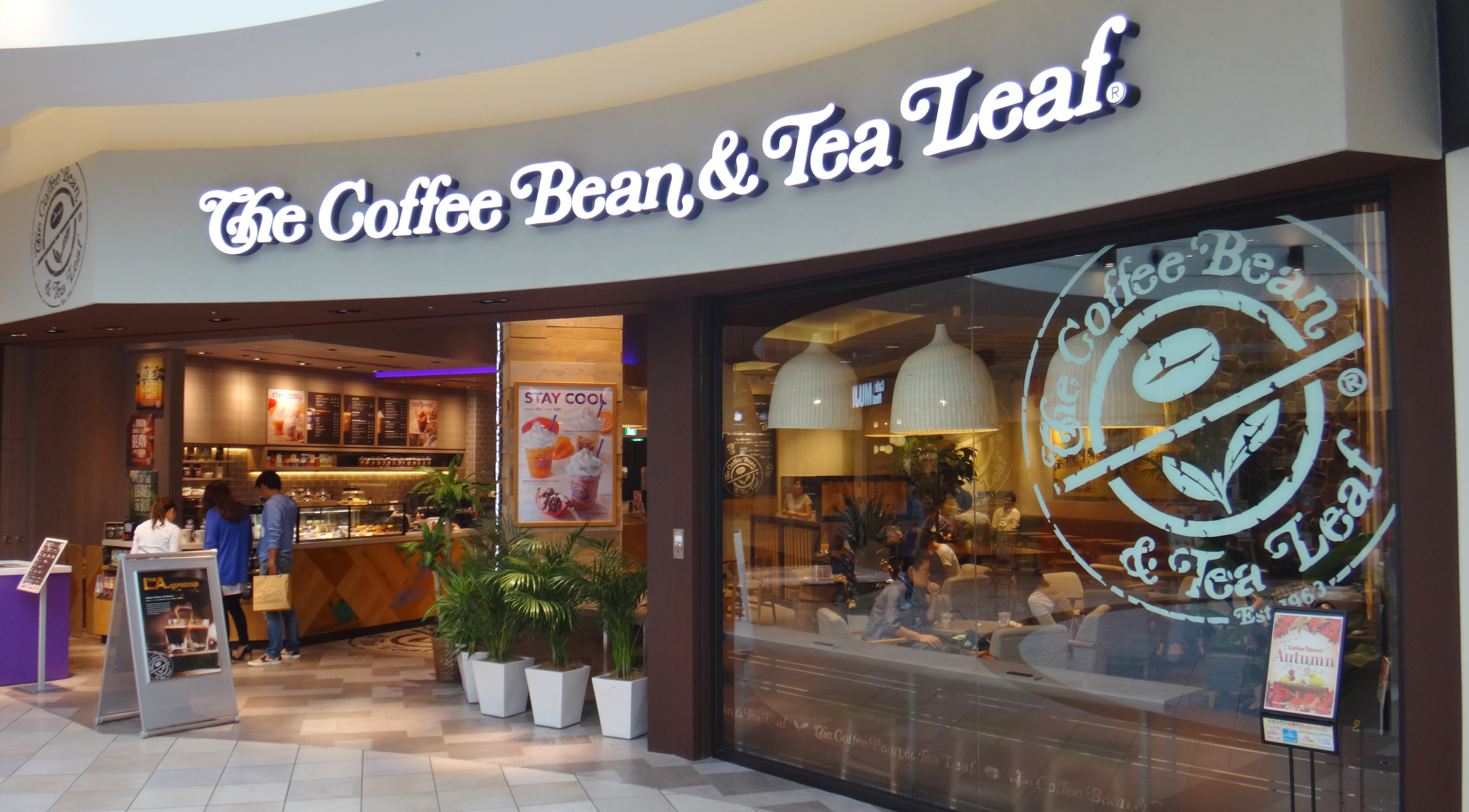
- The Coffee Bean & Tea Leaf in Saitama Prefecture, Japan
- Trade name: The Coffee Bean & Tea Leaf
- Type: Subsidiary
- Industry: Restaurants; Retail coffee and tea Franchising
- Founded: Los Angeles (1963; 63 years ago)
- Founder: Herbert B. Hyman; Mona Hyman
- Headquarters: Los Angeles, California, United States
- Number of locations: 1,232 (as of 2024)
- Area served: 24 countries (as of 2024)
- Key people: John In de Braekt (CEO)
- Products: Coffee, tea, food
- Revenue: ▲$500 million+ USD (January 2013)
- Number of employees: 12,000 (May 2013)
- Parent: Jollibee Group
- Website: www.coffeebean.com

The Coffee Bean & Tea Leaf (sometimes shortened to simply "Coffee Bean" or "The Coffee Bean") is an American coffee chain founded in 1963. It was previously owned and operated by International Coffee & Tea, LLC based in Los Angeles, California, before it was acquired in 2019 by Jollibee Group, a multinational company based in the Philippines, for $350 million.

As of 2024, the chain has 1,232 stores spread across 24 countries.

== History ==
The former logo still used in some stores

Wordmark as it appears on official website

The company was founded by Herbert Hyman (1931–2014) in September 1963, as a coffee service for offices. His wife Mona (whom he married in 1966) and he honeymooned in Sweden where they discovered quality coffee. This sparked the decision to import, roast and sell gourmet coffee in Los Angeles, opening the first Coffee Bean store in 1968 in the Los Angeles neighborhood of Brentwood. Innovations included selling whole beans and touting their country of origin and allowing customers to observe the beans being roasted and then to sample varieties before making a purchase.

By the 1970s the firm had expanded to 10 stores in Southern California and had added exotic teas to the menu. In the summer of 1987 an employee brought a blender to a Westwood store where he mixed together ice, coffee extract and chocolate powder, paving the way for the company's signature Ice Blended drinks. With the invention of the Ice Blended, the chain saw a surge in popularity. The drink was a predecessor to the Starbucks Frappuccino. In 1991, when it was first planning to expand into Los Angeles, Starbucks tried to purchase the firm, but Hyman turned them down. The opening of Starbucks stores in Los Angeles unexpectedly helped Coffee Bean's business, by driving curious customers to the area.

In 1996, the Hymans sold the Asian franchise rights to Singaporean brothers Victor Sassoon and Sunny Sassoon. The Sassoons quickly expanded the company in the US and internationally, opening the first outlet in Singapore in 1996, and in Malaysia the following year. Within two years, they had opened 29 stores in Singapore and Malaysia, almost as many stores as the Hymans had opened in their 35 years of ownership. In 1998, the Sassoons, along with longtime friend Severin Wunderman, purchased the parent company, International Coffee & Tea LLC, from the Hymans, and took it global.

Victor Sassoon worked out of Singapore, Sunny Sassoon worked in Los Angeles, and Wunderman was a silent partner with no role in management. International Coffee & Tea, LLC remained the name of the holding company.

Sunny Sassoon served as president and CEO from 1998 until 2009, when he moved to the executive chairman position until 2019. In 2009, Mel Elias (Sassoon's brother-in-law) assumed the role of president and CEO of the company, after spending seven years as chief operating officer. In September 2013, a significant equity position in Coffee Bean was acquired from International Coffee & Tea by US-based Advent International, in partnership with South Korea-based Mirae Asset Private Equity and Taiwan-based CDIB Capital. The Sassoon family remains a large shareholder. John Fuller served as president and CEO from 2015 to 2020.

In April 28, 2014, Hyman died at the age of 82. He had heart disease.

In 2019, the Philippines' Jollibee Foods Corporation (JFC) acquired The Coffee Bean & Tea Leaf for $350 million, making it Jollibee's biggest investment at the time. JFC bought it through Java Ventures LLC, a company from the US that is a wholly owned subsidiary of Super Magnificent Coffee Company Pte. Ltd. in Singapore, a subsidiary of Jollibee Worldwide Pte Ltd. Under JFC, the company initially closed more stores than it opened. It started from 1,189 stores upon buying it to just 1,048 in 2021. However, the number of stores has risen again to 1,232 as of 2024.

== Products ==
The company is known for its Original Ice Blended coffee and tea drinks, hot coffee drinks, and hot and iced tea drinks. It also sells a variety of whole bean coffees, whole leaf teas, flavored powders, and baked goods.

=== Coffee ===
The company's coffees fall into seven categories: Light & Subtle, Light & Distinctive, Medium & Smooth, Dark & Distinctive, Decaffeinated, Flavored, and Reserve. It roasts approximately seven million pounds of coffee annually. All of the beans are hand-roasted at its roasting facility in Camarillo, California. The beans come from farms in Costa Rica, Colombia, Kenya, Indonesia, Jamaica, Thailand, and Sri Lanka. The firm offers several seasonal holiday drinks, in flavors including candy cane, gingerbread, red velvet cake, eggnog, and peppermint. For the company's 50th anniversary in 2013, it introduced a Birthday Cake Ice Blended.

=== Tea ===
The company's teas fall into seven categories: Green, Black, Oolong, Herbal Infusion, Decaffeinated, Flavored, and Tea Master's. All of the teas are hand-blended at its facility in Camarillo, California. The Chai Tea Latte, one of the chain's most popular drinks, was first served in 1998. In March 2014, the company introduced its Tea Granita beverage in two flavors, Pear Berry and Passion Fruit.

=== CBTL single-serve system ===
CBTL, a single-serve system for home use, was launched in the United States, Singapore, Malaysia, South Korea, and the Philippines in 2010. Several types of single-serve capsules are available for the machines: espresso, coffee, tea, and hot chocolate.

=== Kosher and halal ===
All Coffee Bean coffees, teas, and the powders used to make other beverages, are certified kosher. As of June 2020, Coffee Bean ended its storewide kosher-only certification for stores and bakery items in Southern California. Storewide kosher certification was ended for Coffee Bean locations in the Las Vegas area months earlier. While Coffee Bean had planned to move away from kosher-only certification to provide more offerings as a phased rollout before the COVID-19 pandemic, the company said the crisis accelerated its plan.

Prior to June 2020, all company-owned locations in Southern California were certified kosher. During that time, most in California and Nevada had signed and dated certificates indicating that the entirety of their items were kosher in conformance to the standards of the certifying agency, the Kosher Supervision of America. Even before June 2020, privately owned franchise stores could opt-out of kosher certification.

All the company's locations in Singapore and Malaysia are halal.

== Locations ==
.A Coffee Bean & Tea Leaf location in Angeles City, Philippines

As of 2024, the Coffee Bean and Tea Leaf has a total of 1,232 stores in 24 countries, including Bahrain, Bangladesh, Brunei, India, Indonesia, Israel, Jordan, Kingdom of Saudi Arabia, Kuwait, Kurdistan, Malaysia, Mongolia, Myanmar, Oman, Pakistan, Panama, Paraguay, Philippines, Qatar, Singapore, South Korea, Sri Lanka, USA, and Vietnam.

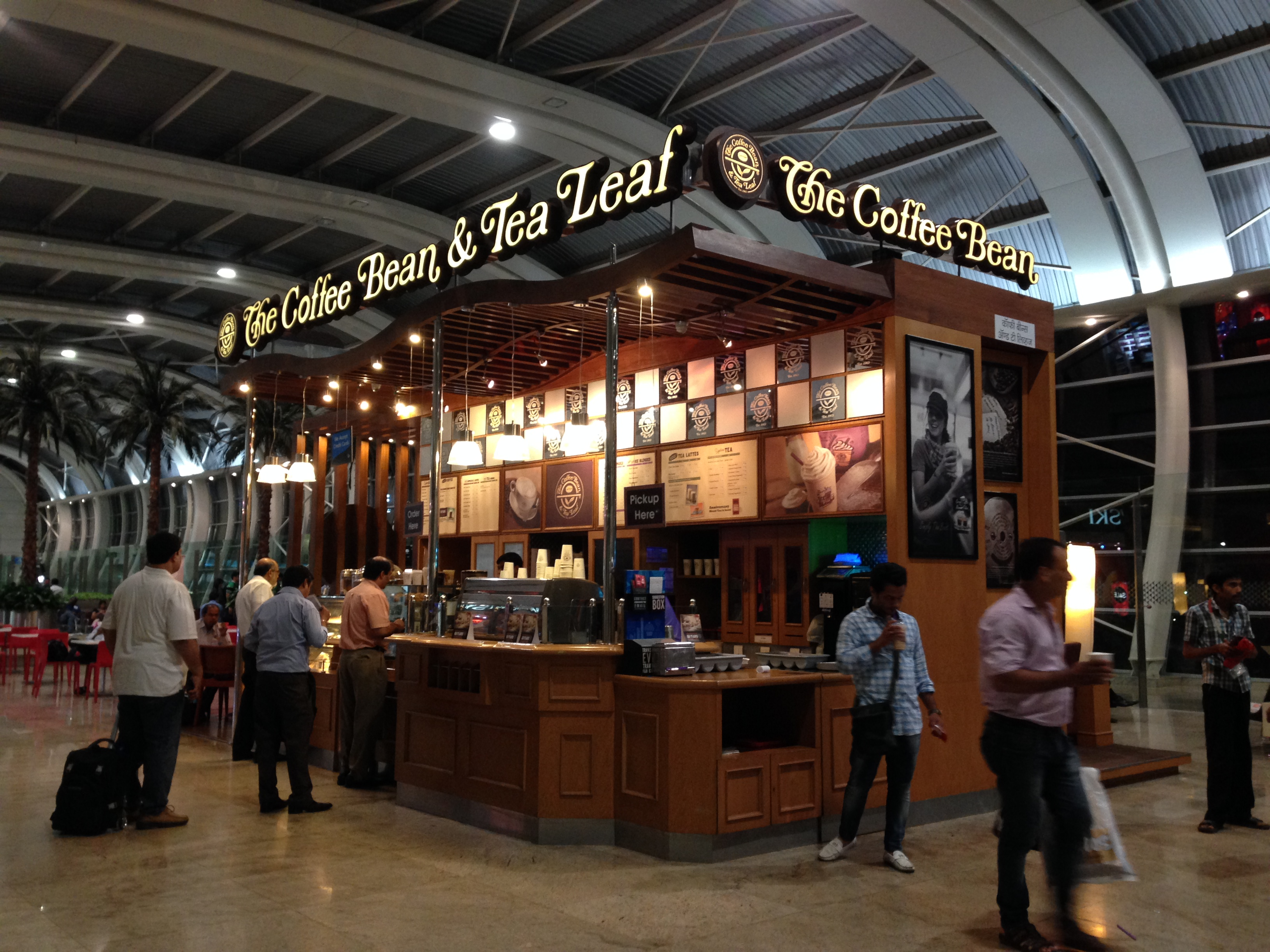
A Coffee Bean & Tea Leaf outlet at Mumbai Airport T1 in India

== Partnerships ==
On 5 September 2012, Nokia announced a deal with the chain to offer wireless charging facilities in its cafés. On May 28, 2013, Hilton Worldwide announced they had signed an exclusive agreement for Coffee Bean to provide in-room coffee and tea for all Hilton hotels in North America, South America, and Central America.

Green Mountain Coffee Roasters announced on May 29, 2013, that they had partnered with Coffee Bean to create a K-Cup for Keurig single-cup brewing systems, available in the US as of 2014.

On August 24, 2015, the firm announced they had signed an exclusive area development agreement with South Korean retail conglomerate E-LAND to enter into the Chinese market. On July 21, 2020, the Coffee Bean & Tea Leaf entered into a partnership with fast casual chain Smashburger, and began incorporating Coffee Bean & Tea Leaf products into their menu.

== Controversies ==
A lawsuit was filed in Los Angeles Superior Court in 2012 after lead plaintiff Roderick Smith discovered a peeping Tom spy camera nestled in the u-bend of the sink in an Encino, California café in October 2011. Smith said after he noticed the device inside the bathroom's unisex facilities, he immediately told management at the shop but was told the camera looked more like a flash drive, according to Smith's attorney Brian Kabateck. In a statement the company said: “We believe that our cooperation helped lead to the arrest of the suspect. In light of the pending litigation surrounding this matter, we are unable to comment further at this time.”

The Singapore chain of Coffee Bean & Tea Leaf apologized in 2019 for a blunder in its original promotional artwork to mark SAF Day, which seemed to depict a Chinese soldier in uniform rather than Singapore Armed Forces.

== See also ==
- List of coffeehouse chains
