= He Yong =

He Yong may refer to:

- He Yong (Han dynasty) (206–220), Chinese official in Han dynasty
- He Yong (politician) (born 1940), official of the Chinese Communist Party
- He Yong (rock musician) (1969–2026), Chinese rock singer
