= DoubleDragon Corporation =

Philippine real estate company

DoubleDragon
- Formerly: Injap Land Corporation (2009–2012); DoubleDragon Properties Corporation (2012–2021)
- Type: Public
- Traded as: PSE: DD (common) PSE: DDPR (preferred)
- Industry: Real estate Retail
- Founded: December 9, 2009; 16 years ago in Iloilo City
- Founder: Edgar Sia II
- Headquarters: 10th floor, Tower 1, DoubleDragon Plaza, DD Meridian Park Macapagal Boulevard corner EDSA Extension, Bay City, Pasay City, Metro Manila, Philippines
- Area served: Philippines
- Key people: Edgar Sia II (CEO and Chairman); Tony Tan Caktiong (Co-chairman); Ferdinand Sia (Vice Chairman); Rizza Marie Joy Sia (CFO)
- Parent: Injap Investments, Inc. Honeystar Holdings Corporation
- Subsidiaries: CityMall, Hotel101
- Website: doubledragon.com.ph

Corporate logo before 2021

DoubleDragon Corporation, formerly Injap Land Corporation and DoubleDragon Properties Corporation, is a Philippine investment management company based in Pasay City, Metro Manila, Philippines. It was founded in 2009 as a subsidiary of Injap Investments, Inc in Iloilo City. In 2012, the company became a joint venture between Injap Investments, Inc. and Honeystar Holdings Corporation.

It is the parent company of CityMall, which planned to build 100 shopping malls by 2020.

The company went public in 2014. As of September 2024, it has a market capitalization of PHP 21.5 billion. In 2025, its subsidiary, Hotel101 Global became the first Filipino-owned firm to be listed on the Nasdaq Stock Exchange in New York.

== Subsidiaries ==
- CityMall Commercial Centers, Inc.
- DoubleDragon Sales Corporation
- DoubleDragon Property Management Corporation
- DD Happyhomes Residential Centers, Inc.
- DD-Meridian Park Development Corporation
- Hotel of Asia, Inc.
  - Injap Tower Hotel Iloilo
  - Hotel 101
    - In April, 2024, aside from operating Hotel101-Manila and Hotel101-Bonifacio Global City, DoubleDragon announced the opening of 519-unit Hotel101-Davao City, 548-unit Hotel101 Cebu-Mactan, Hotel101-Libis Camp Atienza, Eastwood, and Hotel101 branded hotels in Palawan, Bohol, Boracay, Cagayan de Oro and Baguio.
    - Hotel101 Global Pte.Ltd.- the hotel brand's Singapore-based unit, primarily responsible for the hotel's global operations. The subsidiary is currently involved for the development of the Hotel101-Niseko, a 1.17-hectare (2.9-acre), 482-room hotel in Niseko, Hokkaido, Japan. The company also launched its second hotel on Madrid, Spain, named Hotel101-Madrid, a 680-room hotel and serves as the company's first hotel in the European Continent.
- Iloilo-Guimaras Ferry Terminal Corporation
- Piccadilly Circus Landing, Inc.

== Gallery ==
The Skysuites Tower in Quezon City

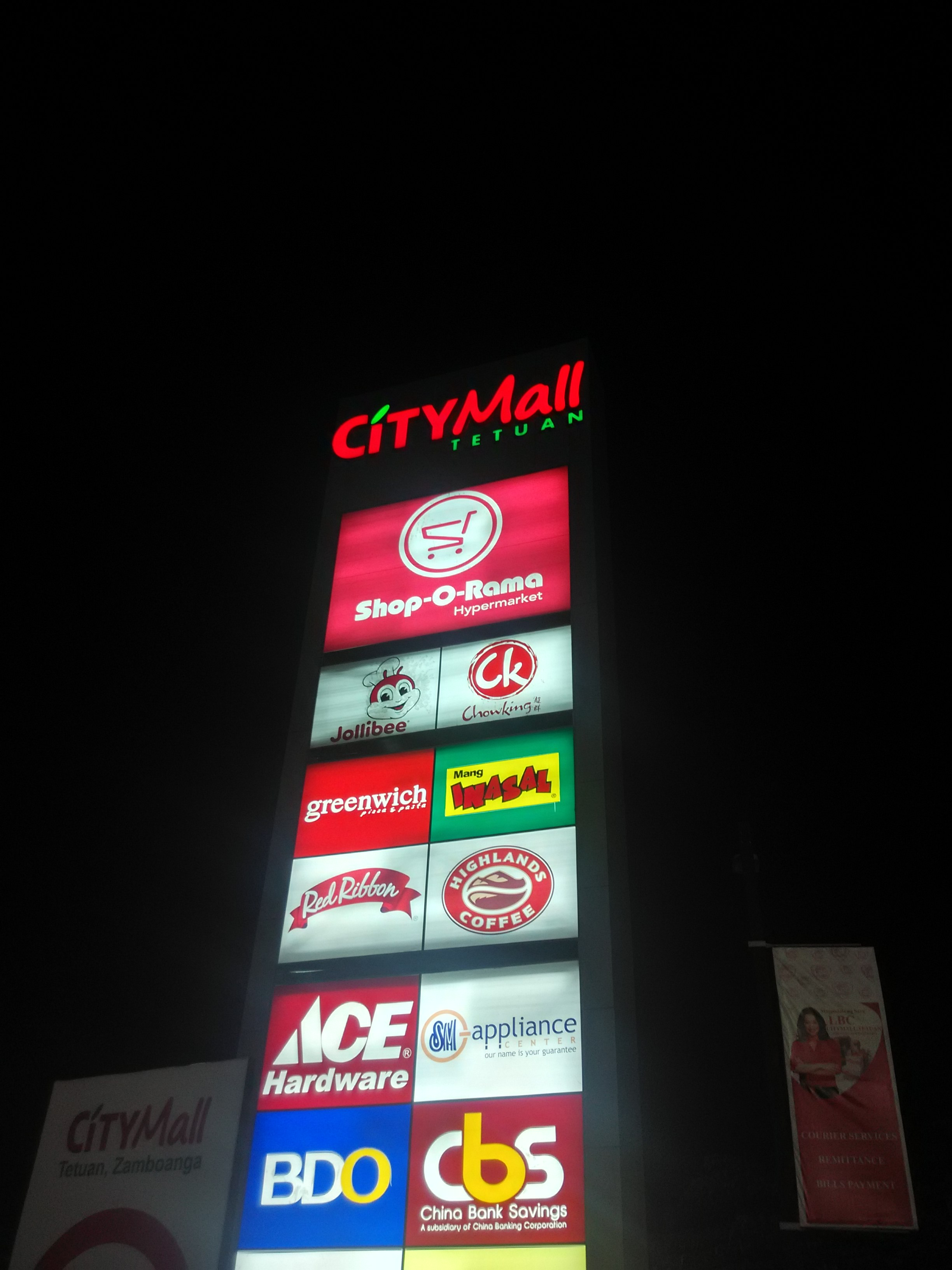
Signage at CityMall Tetuan-Zamboanga

The DoubleDragon Plaza at DD Meridian Park along EDSA Extension in Pasay
