= Red Ribbon Bakeshop =

Filipino bakery chain

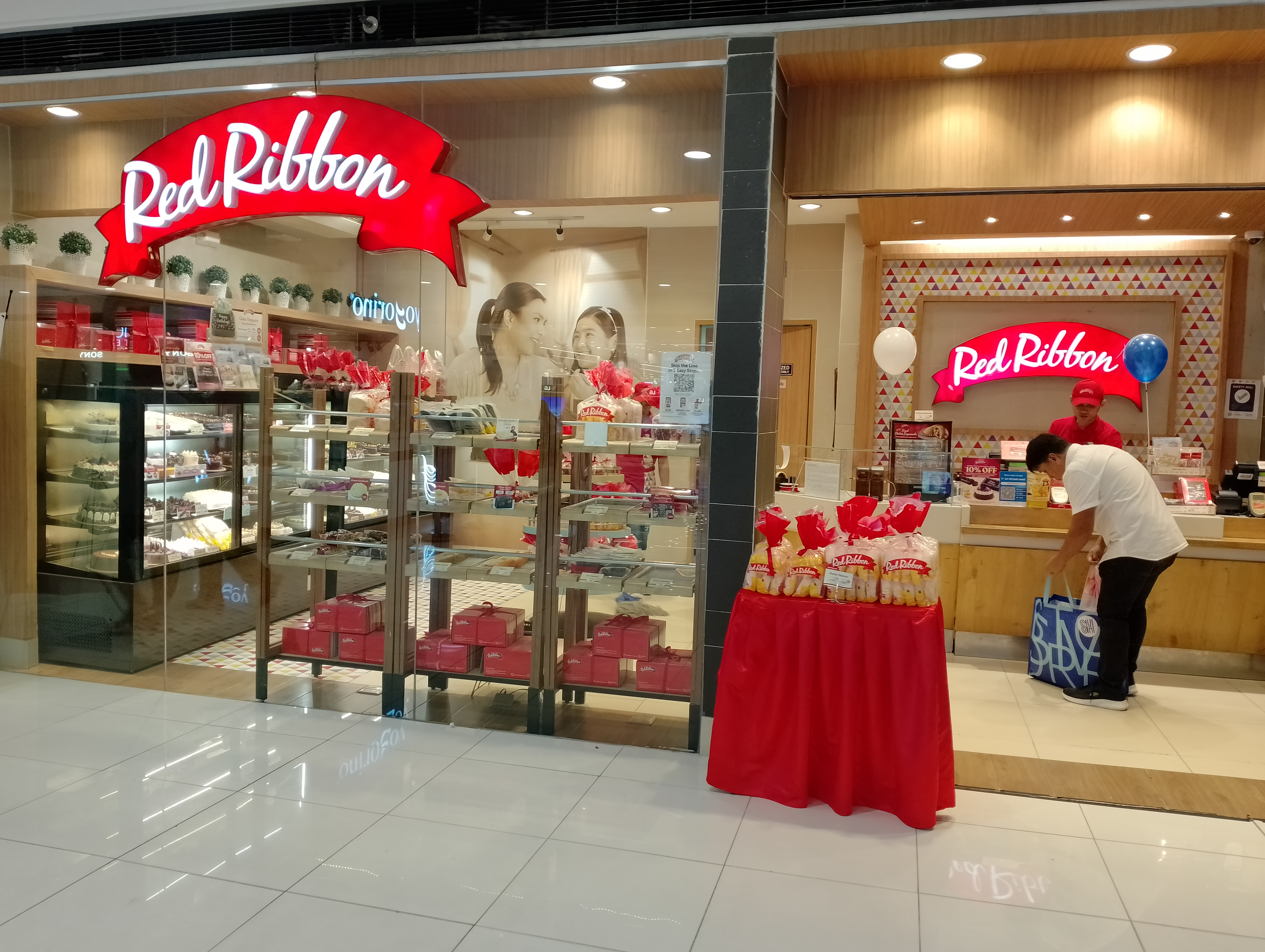
- A Red Ribbon bakeshop in SM City Cebu
- Type: Subsidiary
- Founded: 1979; 47 years ago in Quezon City, Philippines
- Founders: Renato Mercado; Amalia Hizon Mercado
- Number of locations: 500+
- Area served: Philippines; California; Nevada; New Jersey; Arizona; New York; Virginia; Illinois; Washington; Texas; Florida; Hawaii; Maryland; Pennsylvania; Michigan
- Products: Fast food, pastries, and cakes
- Parent: RRB Holdings Inc. (Jollibee Group)
- Website: www.redribbonbakeshop.com.ph www.redribbonbakeshop.com

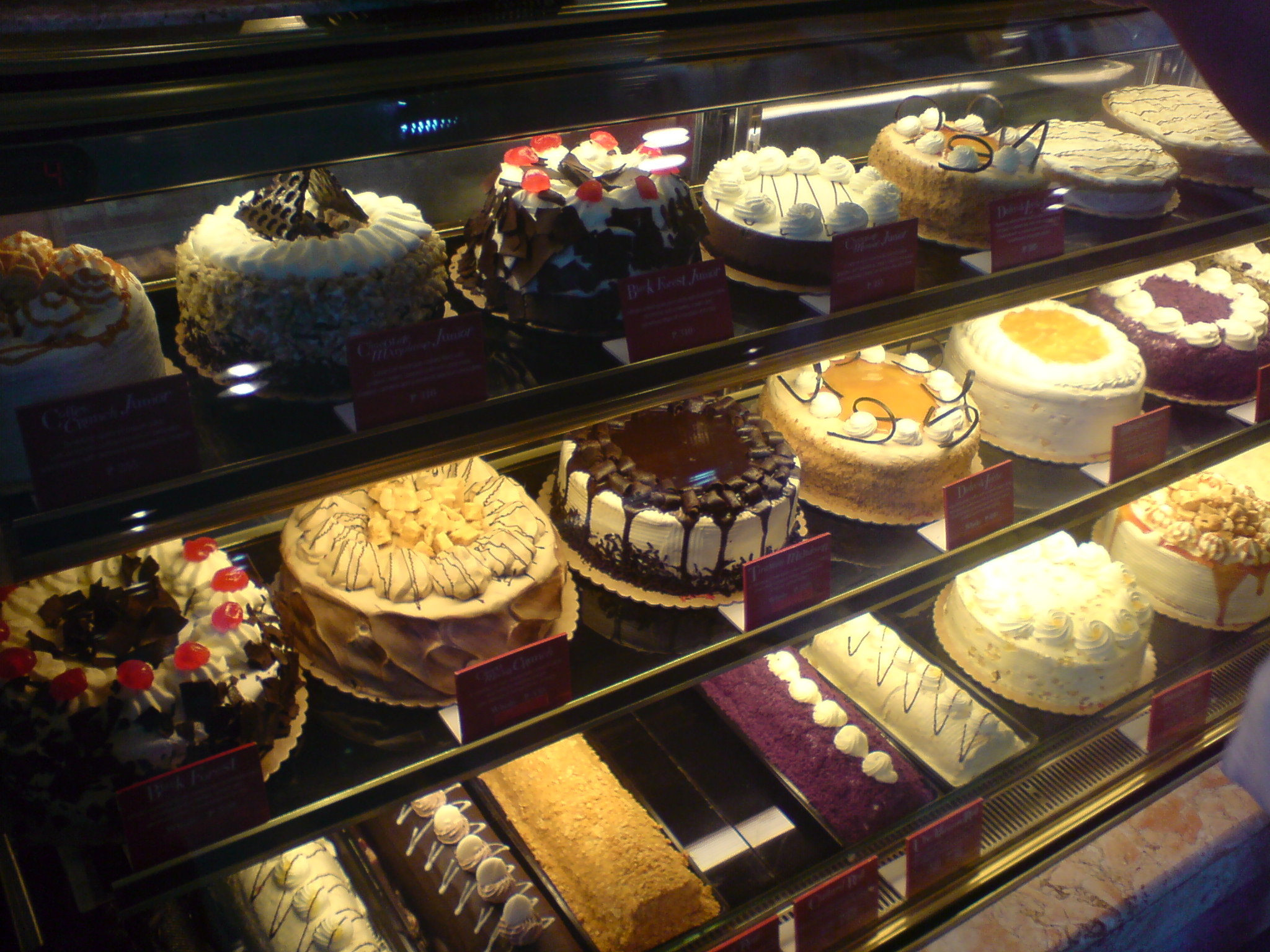
A selection of Red Ribbon cakes on sale

Red Ribbon Bakeshop, Inc. is a bakery chain based in the Philippines, which produces and distributes cakes and pastries. It is owned by the Mercados, a Filipino family. Red Ribbon makes baked goods primarily for family celebrations.

== History ==
In 1979, Amalia Hizon Mercado, her husband Renato Mercado, and their five children, Consuelo Tiutan, Teresita Moran, Renato Mercado, Ricky Mercado and Romy Mercado established Red Ribbon as a small cake shop along Timog Avenue in Quezon City. The cakes developed by Teresita gave Red Ribbon its prominence. In 1984, it opened its first overseas outlet in West Covina, California. The company began franchising in 1999. Today, more than 200 branches operate in the Philippines; 32 in California; five in Las Vegas; two in New Jersey (Jersey City and Bergenfield); one in Metropolitan Phoenix; two in New York City; one in Virginia Beach, Virginia; one in Chicago, one in Metropolitan Detroit, and two in Houston, Texas.

In 2005, Red Ribbon was acquired by Jollibee Group. Red Ribbon Bakeshop, Inc. is managed through JFC's holding company, RRB Holdings.

== See also ==
- List of bakeries
