= List of the tallest statues in the Philippines =

Map

This list of tallest statues in the Philippines includes free-standing, completed statues that are at least 5 meters (16 feet) tall. The height of these statues are measured from the top of its base/pedestal up to its maximum height (including monuments with spires or obelisks).

== Existing statues ==
As of 3 November 2022, this table includes the following statues with a height of 5 m (16 ft) and above.

Rank	Statue		Depicts	Locations	Year completed	Height	Notes	Coordinates
1	Mother of All Asia–Tower of Peace	Image	Virgin Mary	Batangas City, Batangas	2021	98.15 m (322.0 ft)	Total height of concrete monument is 98.15 m (322 ft). Construction began in 2014. The world's tallest statue of the Virgin Mary.	13°38′27″N 121°02′27″E
2	The Victor		A faceless man standing upright with a raised fist	Bridgetowne, Metro Manila	2021	55 m (180 ft)	The colossal stainless steel art installation measures a total height of 60 m (197 ft) including the five-meter podium on which it stands. The artwork, sculpted by Orlando-based Filipino-American visual artist Jefrë, weighs 300 t (661,387 lb) and surpassed the height of Statue of Liberty, at 55 meters	14°35′37″N 121°04′59″E
3	St. Vincent Ferrer Statue	Image	Vincent Ferrer	Bayambang, Pangasinan	2019	42 m (138 ft)	Recognized by the Guinness World Records as the tallest bamboo sculpture in the world with a total height of 50.23 m including its 8.23 m (27.0 ft) base.	15°49′11″N 120°26′39″E
4	Sacred Heart of Jesus		Jesus Christ	Roxas, Capiz	2015	40 m (130 ft)	Located within the Pueblo de Panay Tourism Complex in Barangay Dinginan. Designed by Filipino sculptor John Alaban.	11°32′53″N 122°43′39″E
5	Divine Mercy Statue		Jesus Christ	Calbiga, Samar	2020	36.5 m (120 ft)	Construction began in 2017 and topped off in 2020. Constructed through the initiative of the Franciscan Sisters of the Divine Mercy.	11°39′42″N 125°01′40″E
6	Divine Mercy Statue	Image	Jesus Christ	Marilao, Bulacan	2017	30.5 m (100 ft)	Construction began in 2016 and was unveiled and blessed in 2017. The 100 ft (30 m) statue stands on a 50 ft (15 m) pedestal building. The total height of the structure is 150 ft (46 m).	14°46′38″N 120°58′35″E
7	Sacred Heart of Jesus Statue		Jesus Christ	Carcar, Cebu	2012	29.2 m (96 ft)	Located inside a private compound called the Meditative Garden of the Sacred Heart of Jesus in Barangay Can-asujan.	10°08′11″N 123°39′28″E
8	Our Lady of the Miraculous Medal Statue (Agtalin Shrine)		Virgin Mary	Pilar, Capiz	1993	24.4 m (80 ft)	Built in 1991 on top of Agtalin Hill at Brgy. Dulangan. It was the tallest Marian statue in the Philippines at the time of its completion in 1993.	11°27′38″N 122°57′48″E
9	Christ the King Statue		Jesus Christ	Gingoog, Misamis Oriental	2019	22.8 m (75 ft)	Located along Claveria Road in Barangay Samay	8°44′26″N 125°05′24″E
10	Regina Rosarii Statue		Virgin Mary	Tanay, Rizal	2010	21.6 m (71 ft)	Located on top of a hill inside the Regina Rosarii Institute of Contemplation in Asia (Regina RICA), a pilgrimage site, ecological sanctuary and convent in Sitio Aguho, Barangay Sampaloc.	14°31′58″N 121°22′16″E
11	Mother of Mercy Statue		Virgin Mary	Calbiga, Samar	2022	21.3 m (70 ft)	Located on top of the St. Padre Pio Shrine in Brgy. Timbangan, Calbiga, Samar, a few meters from the 36.5 m (120 ft) Divine Mercy Shrine. Constructed through the initiative of the Franciscan Sisters of the Divine Mercy.	11°39′42″N 125°01′32″E
12	Our Lady of the Miraculous Medal Statue		Virgin Mary	Baybay, Leyte	2021	19.8 m (65 ft)	Located in barangay Lintaon in Lintaon peak near the 16,000 blossoms facing Baybay City proper.	10°36′48″N 124°47′47″E
13	Bayani		A young faceless man wearing headphones, symbolizing the Filipino youth	Pasay, Metro Manila	2022	19.5 m (64 ft)	Located beside the DoubleDragon Meridian Park building along EDSA. The monument is the work of Filipino sculptor Jefre Figueras Manuel.	14°32′12″N 120°59′30″E
14	People Power Monument		People Power Revolution	Quezon City, Metro Manila	1993	18 m (59 ft)	Located on the corner of Epifanio de los Santos Avenue and White Plains Avenue, on the southwest corner of Camp Aguinaldo.	14°36′00″N 121°03′36″E
15	Christ the Savior Statue		Jesus Christ	Alaminos, Pangasinan	2017	17.1 m (56 ft)	Located on top of a hill at Pilgrimage Island, part of the Hundred Islands National Park.	16°12′37″N 120°02′28″E
16	Divine Mercy Statue		Jesus Christ	El Salvador, Misamis Oriental	2008	15.2 m (50 ft)	The statue has two concrete rays that contain stairs leading to the head of the statue.	8°32′49″N 124°31′41″E
16	Kamay ni Hesus		Jesus Christ	Lucban, Quezon	2002	15.2 m (50 ft)	Located on top of a hill at the foot of Mount Banahaw in Barangay Tinamnan, accessible via a 300-step stairway.	14°06′06″N 121°34′21″E
16	Immaculate Conception Statue		Virgin Mary	Laguindingan, Misamis Oriental	2014	15.2 m (50 ft)	Located in Barangay Sambulawan	8°35′29″N 124°24′52″E
16	Padre Pio Monument		Padre Pio	San Jose del Monte, Bulacan	2019	15.2 m (50 ft)	Started construction in May 2018. Located within the Padre Pio Mountain of Healing Complex in Area C, Barangay Paradise 3. It is the tallest statue of St. Pio of Pietrelcina in the Philippines.	14°50′05″N 121°06′28″E
17	Nuestra Señora de Salvacion Statue		Virgin Mary	Legazpi, Albay	2022	14.9 m (49 ft)	Located at a rotunda along the Legazpi Airport Access Road between Barangays Pawa, Tamaoyan, and Rawis.	13°10′12″N 123°44′21″E
18	Rizal Monument		Jose Rizal	Rizal Park, Manila	1913	14.6 m (48 ft)	The monument stands on a 5.1 m (17 ft) base and steps with a height of 0.60 m (2.0 ft), while the obelisk has a height of 8.9 m (29 ft). Designed by Swiss sculptor Richard Kissling.	14°34′54″N 120°58′36″E
19	Bonifacio Monument		Andres Bonifacio	Caloocan, Metro Manila	1933	13.7 m (45 ft)	Its height includes an obelisk with a winged figure on top. Located at the center of a rotunda at the intersection of Epifanio de los Santos Avenue (EDSA), MacArthur Highway, Samson Road and Rizal Avenue.	14°39′25″N 120°59′02″E
19	The Transfiguration of Christ		Jesus Christ	Caloocan, Metro Manila	1976	13.7 m (45 ft)	The monument is located atop the archway of Eternal Gardens Memorial Park, a private cemetery in Barangay 158 (Libis Baesa). The 10 m (33 ft) steel and bronze monument, designed by National Artist for Sculpture Napoleon Abueva, stands on a 3.6 m (12 ft) concrete pedestal.	14°40′12″N 121°00′03″E
19	Christ the Redeemer Statue (Caluya Shrine)		Jesus Christ	Sapang Dalaga, Misamis Occidental	2017	13.7 m (45 ft)	The monument is located on top of a 120-meter high hill in Barangay Caluya, facing Murcielagos Bay.	8°36′36″N 123°34′49″E
20	Lion's Head	Image	A male lion's head	Baguio–Tuba Boundary, Benguet	1972	12.1 m (40 ft)	A popular landmark for tourists entering Baguio via Kennon Road. Commissioned by the local Lions Club and sculpted from a limestone rock in the area by artists Reynaldo Nanyac and Anselmo Day-ag.	16°22′03″N 120°36′21″E
20	Statue of the Sentinel of Freedom	Image	Lapu-Lapu	Rizal Park, Manila	2004	12.1 m (40 ft)	Stands on a 10 ft (3.0 m) pedestal. Located at the Agrifina Circle between the National Museum of Anthropology and the National Museum of Natural History.	14°35′03″N 120°58′53″E
20	Kamay ni Maria Statue		Virgin Mary	Bauan, Batangas	2014	12.1 m (40 ft)	The monument is located inside the Hacienda Antonia estate in Barangay Baguilawa.	13°47′15″N 120°57′28″E
20	Statue of the Risen Christ		Jesus Christ	Magalang, Pampanga	2015	12.1 m (40 ft)	The monument is located inside the Banal a Bunduk, Dalan Ning Krus pilgrimage site in Barangay Ayala at the foot of Mount Arayat.	15°12′33″N 120°43′30″E
20	The Time Sculpture		Box-headed man glancing at wristwatch	Mandaluyong, Metro Manila	2021	12.1 m (40 ft)	Located beside SM Megamall shopping center. The monument is the work of Jefre Figueras Manuel and was commissioned by the SM Group.	14°35′04″N 121°03′21″E
21	Our Lady of the Assumption Statue		Virgin Mary	Maasin, Southern Leyte	1994	10.9 m (36 ft)	Located on top of Jalleca Hills in Barangay Mantahan. A 235-step staircase leads to the monument.	10°07′01″N 124°54′03″E
22	Our Lady of EDSA Monument		Virgin Mary	Quezon City, Metro Manila	1989	10.7 m (35 ft)	The monument, designed by sculptor Virginia Ty-Navarro, is located on the roof of the EDSA Shrine, which also serves as a Roman Catholic chapel. The shrine, designed by National Artist for Architecture Francisco Mañosa, is located on the corner of the northbound side of Epifanio de los Santos Avenue and the eastbound side of Ortigas Avenue.	14°35′32″N 121°03′31″E
23	Divine Mercy Shrine		Jesus Christ	Lake Sebu, South Cotabato	2015	10 m (33 ft)	Stands on a 5 m (16 ft) base for a total height of 15 m (49 ft). Located in Sitio Floren, Barangay Lamdalag.	6°11′42″N 124°44′00″E
24	Statue of the Risen Christ		Jesus Christ	San Jose, Tarlac	2002	9.1 m (30 ft)	The statue is located inside the Monasterio de Tarlac complex in Barangay Lubigan.	15°26′14″N 120°25′41″E
24	Virgin Mary Statue		Virgin Mary	Hungduan, Ifugao	2003	9.1 m (30 ft)	The statue is located on the side of the Nueva Vizcaya-Ifugao-Mountain Province Road atop Mount Polis, between a cell site and a police station near the boundary of Ifugao and Mountain Province.	16°57′57″N 121°01′35″E
24	Christ the Redeemer Statue		Jesus Christ	Cagayan de Oro, Misamis Oriental	2011	9.1 m (30 ft)	Located inside Golden Haven Memorial Park, a private cemetery in Barangay Bulua.	8°29′48″N 124°36′36″E
25	Our Lady of the Most Holy Rosary Grotto		Virgin Mary	Caramoan, Camarines Sur	1990	7.9 m (26 ft)	The monument is located on top of Mount Caglago in Barangay Tabgon and is accessible through a 524-step stairway. The current statue is the second statue, which replaced the first one that was damaged by a typhoon.	13°49′47″N 123°48′30″E
25	Rizal Monument		Jose Rizal	Santa Cruz, Laguna	2014	7.9 m (26 ft)	The monument, designed by Filipino sculptor Toym Imao, is located within the Laguna Sports Complex in Barangay San Juan. It depicts Rizal as a sportsman in fencing attire and holding a foil. Although reported to be the tallest Jose Rizal monument in the world, the Rizal Monument in Manila remains the tallest as its height includes its obelisk.	14°15′20″N 121°24′21″E
26	Christ the Redeemer Statue		Jesus Christ	San Fernando, La Union	2007	7.6 m (25 ft)	The monument is located on top of Reservoir Hill and overlooks the City of San Fernando.	16°37′13″N 120°19′08″E
27	Rizal Monument		Jose Rizal	Calamba, Laguna	2011	6.7 m (22 ft)	The monument, designed by Filipino sculptor Jonas Roces, is 6.7 m (22 ft) in height, with a granite pedestal of 2.40 m (7.9 ft) and a 4 m (13 ft) circular stairway base.	14°11′45″N 121°09′35″E
28	Nuestra Señora de Salvacion Statue		Virgin Mary and drowning sailor	Lavezares, Northern Samar	2005	5.5 m (18 ft)	The monument depicts the Virgin Mary saving a drowning sailor from a sinking ship. It stands atop a concrete ship built on a reef located 3 km (1.9 mi) from the port of Lavezares.	12°32′57″N 124°20′01″E

== Statues being planned/under construction ==
- Divine Mercy Statue (Consolacion), a 39.7 m (130 ft) steel and concrete statue of Jesus Christ being planned for construction in Barangay Garing, Consolacion, Cebu. Construction started in January 2020 and is expected to be completed by 2021 in time for the 500th anniversary of the arrival of Christianity in the Philippines.

== Destroyed statues ==
- Bust of Ferdinand Marcos, a 30 m (98 ft) concrete bust of former dictator Philippine President Ferdinand Marcos in Mount Shontoug, Barangay Taloy Sur, Tuba, Benguet. It was built in 1978 and completed in 1980, but was destroyed by the communist rebel group New People's Army using dynamite in 2002.

== See also ==
- List of tallest statues
