= Bayambang Church =

Roman Catholic church in Pangasinan, Philippines

- Archdiocesan Shrine and Parish of Saint Vincent Ferrer
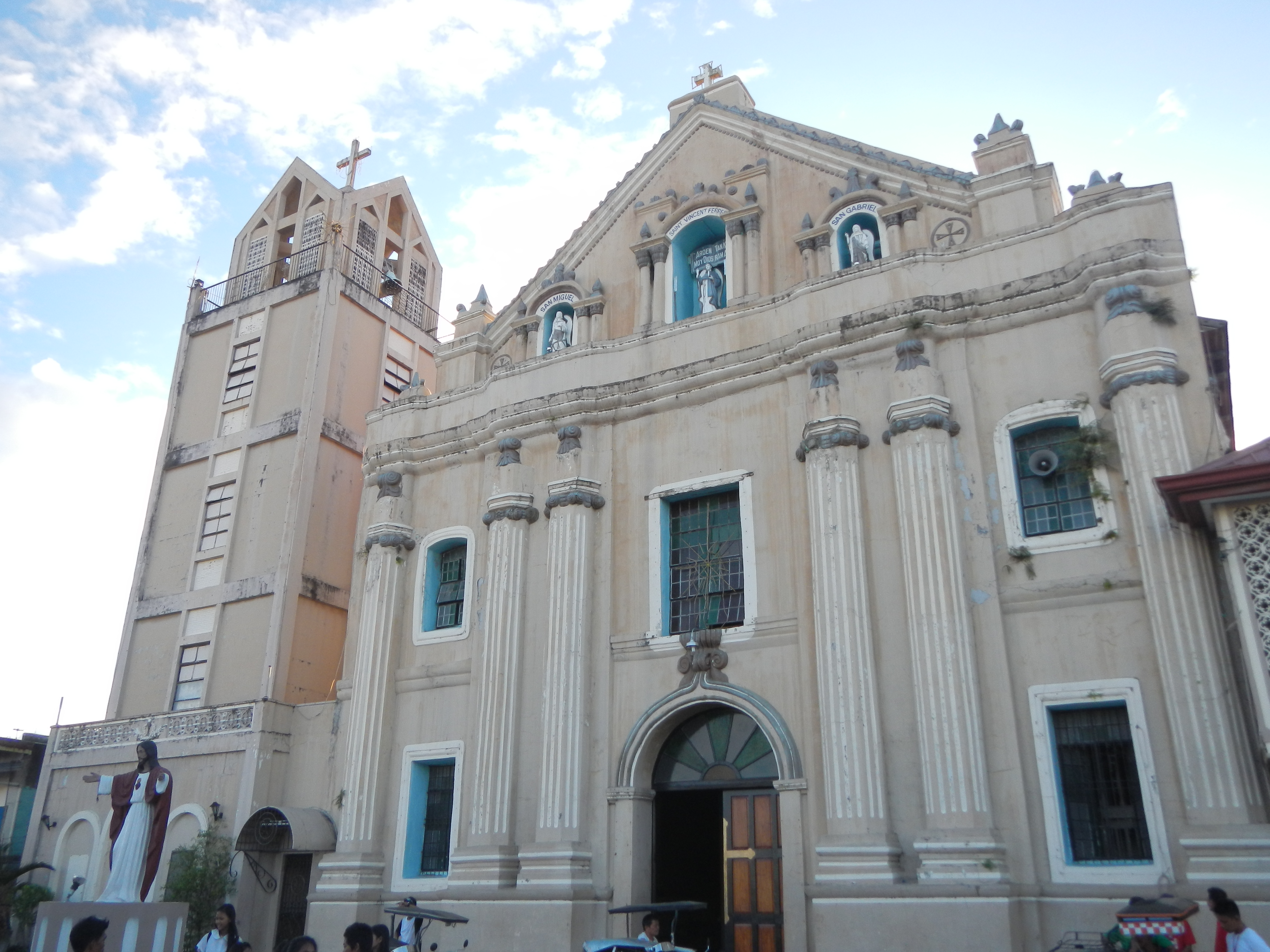
- Church façade in 2012

- Location in Luzon Location in the Philippines
- 15°48′31″N 120°27′20″E
- Location: Bayambang, Pangasinan
- Country: Philippines
- Denomination: Roman Catholic

History
- Status: Archdiocesan Shrine
- Founded: 1619
- Dedication: Saint Vincent Ferrer

Architecture
- Functional status: Active
- Architectural type: Church building
- Style: Baroque architecture

Administration
- Archdiocese: Lingayen-Dagupan

Clergy
- Priest(s): Fr. Reydentor Mejia as Shrine Rector & Fr. Marlon Allam as Parochial Vicar

The Archdiocesan Shrine and Parish of Saint Vincent Ferrer, commonly known as Bayambang Church, is a Roman Catholic church located in the municipality of Bayambang in Pangasinan, Philippines. It is under the jurisdiction of the Archdiocese of Lingayen-Dagupan. The parish church celebrated its quadricentennial year in April 2019, coinciding with the completion of the 50.23-metre (164.8 ft) St. Vincent Ferrer Statue. On April 5, 2025, it was elevated to an archdiocesan shrine.

== Architectural history ==
Father Manuel Mora built a wooden church, with three naves, and an old convent at the town of Bayambang in 1804. It was damaged by an earthquake in 1863. In 1869, a second church and convent was built from stone and mortar with galvanized iron roofing. Father Manuel Sucias rehabilitated the church with a cruciform plan in 1804. Father Manuel Sucias (1813-1824); Father Juan Alvarez del Manzano (1833-1835); Father Joaquin Flores; Father Benito Foncuberta (1836-1840); and Father Jose Ibañez (1836-1840) directed and supervised the gradual construction of the church. In 1856, the church, as well as its records, was burned. The reconstruction of the church was administered by Father Benito Foncuberto who also built two sacristies and repair the tile roofing which was destroyed by the earthquakes. The galvanized iron roofing measures 16.5 metres (54 ft) wide and 85.7 metres (281 ft) long. Father Ciriaco Billote contributed a new church belfry for the reconstructed church.

== Architectural features ==
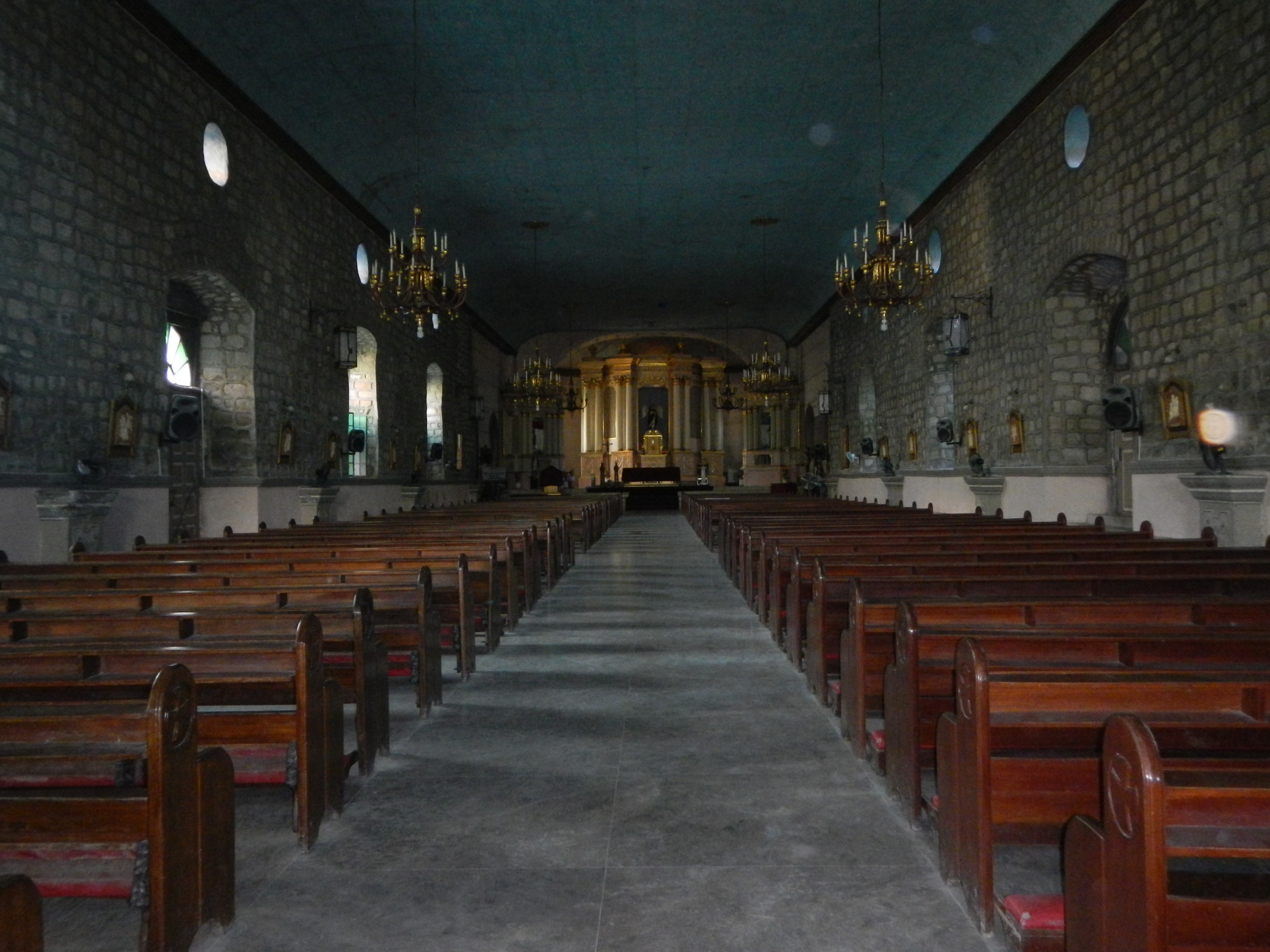
Church nave and interior viewed from the entrance, taken in 2012

The present stone structures, with its galvanized iron roofs, already existed by 1869. The galvanized iron roofing of the church was heavily damaged during World War II. The church was also damaged during the July 16, 1990, earthquake; thus, making the bell tower a later addition within the church.

The facade is in High Renaissance style. It is divided into two levels with six Ionic columns on pedestals running the whole height of the lower level. The pediment was ornamented by statued niches symmetrically designed forming as the second level. The lower ends of the pediment are terminated by massive piers. The two levels are markedly divided by wide horizontal cornice. The main entrance is formed by an arch order with a square window above it. The bell tower on the left is a late addition which is in contrast with the high renaissance style of the church facade.
