= Niña Jose-Quiambao =

Filipino actress

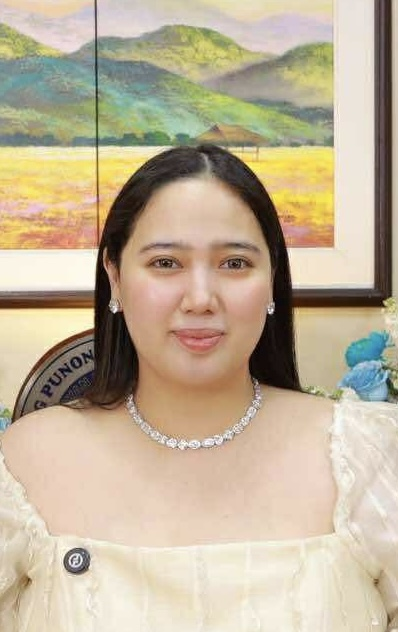
- Jose-Quiambao in 2025

Mayor of Bayambang, Pangasinan
- Incumbent
- Assumed office June 30, 2022
- Vice Mayor: Ian Camille Sabangan
- Preceded by: Cezar Quiambao

Personal details
- Born: Mary Clare Judith Phyllis Atienza Jose; August 26, 1988 (age 37) Manila, Philippines
- Party: Nacionalista
- Spouse: Cezar Quiambao (m. 2017)
- Children: 2
- Occupation: Actress, model, politician

Mary Clare Judith Phyllis "Niña" Atienza Jose-Quiambao (Tagalog: [ˈniɲɐ hoˈse]; born August 26, 1988) is a Filipina actress and politician serving as the mayor of Bayambang, Pangasinan, since 2022. She was a competitor in Pinoy Big Brother: Teen Edition 1 in 2006. She is currently a contract actress for the ABS-CBN television network. She has appeared on the cover of FHM Philippines magazine.

== Personal life ==
Jose is the older of two children born to Philip Jose and Clare Atienza, who later separated. From kindergarten through high school, she studied at Assumption College San Lorenzo, an all-girls Catholic school in Makati, Metro Manila.

In 2016, Jose met billionaire businessman Cezar T. Quiambao. Quiambao, was the president and chief executive officer of STRADCOM Corporation (the information technology service provider of the Land Transportation Office) and is now the president and CEO of the Agricultural Infrastructure and Leasing Corp. The couple met while Quiambao was campaigning for mayor of Bayambang, Pangasinan. The two married three times, first in the United States, second in a civil ceremony and third in a Church wedding at the Saint Vincent Ferrer Parish in Bayambang. The couple had a son named Antonio. In 2020, Jose suffered a miscarriage. The would-be child was named Maria Christiano Isabelo. In 2025, Jose announced that she was expecting the couple's second child.

== Career ==
=== Entertainment career ===
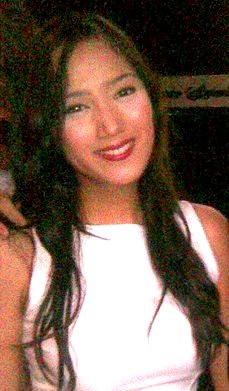
Jose in 2008

In 2006, Jose was one of the housemates (contestants) in the first season of Pinoy Big Brother: Teen Edition. She was one of the most popular housemates in that reality show. Afterwards, she appeared in numerous television shows including Pedro Penduko at ang Mga Engkantao (2007), My Girl (2008), Your Song: My Only Hope (2008), Valiente (2012), Kidlat (2013), and many others. She also appeared in films like Shake, Rattle & Roll X (2008) and Mano Po 6: A Mother's Love (2009).

=== Political career ===
During the term of her husband as Mayor of Bayambang, Pangasinan, Jose served as president of the Local Council of Women of Bayambang. One of her projects is the Abong na Aro or House of Love that provides shelter of women and children who were victim of physical and sexual abuse. She is also the president of the Agricultural Infrastructure and Leasing Corporation, a private entity of the Quiambao family that provided help for farmers in the municipality. Jose also served as president of Kasama Kita sa Barangay Foundation (KKSBFI), Incorporated. She was also behind the St. Vincent Ferrer Statue in Barangay Bani, that was recognized by the Guinness Book of World Records as the world's tallest bamboo sculpture.

In the 2022 elections, although her husband is eligible for a third and final term, she decided to run for mayor. She was elected mayor of Bayambang.

== Filmography ==
=== Film ===
Year	Title	Role	Note
2008	Shake, Rattle & Roll X	Nicole	Segment: Class Picture; special participation; starring role
2008	Desperadas 2	Cita	
2009	Tarot	Teen Auring	
2009	Mano Po 6: A Mother's Love	Erika	
2010	Shake, Rattle and Roll XII	Ray's girlfriend	Segment: Isla; special participation; starring role
2011	Aswang	Queenie	
2012	D' Kilabots Pogi Brothers Weh?!	Justine's suitor	

=== Television ===
Year	Title	Role
2006	Pinoy Big Brother Teen Edition	Herself (Housemate)
2006	Your Song Presents: Akap	Courtney
2006	Da Adventures of Pedro Penduko	Marikit
2007	Your Song Presents: Someday	Bernice
2007	Pedro Penduko at ang mga Engkantao	Marikit
2008	My Girl	Anika Ramirez
2008	Lipgloss	Camille Borromeo
2008	Your Song Presents: My Only Hope	Jessie Singson / Ashley
2009	Banana Split	Various roles
2009	Precious Hearts Romances Presents: The Bud Brothers	Alyssa Rodriguez
2009	Nagsimula sa Puso	Charie
2010	Precious Hearts Romances Presents: Lumang Piso Para sa Puso	Erika
2010	M3: Malay Mo Ma-develop	Meg
2011	Pablo S. Gomez's Mutya	Nerissa
2011	Pinoy Samurai	Herself
2011	I Dare You	Herself (Challenger)
2011	Face to Face Untold Stories Presents: Kaagaw o Kaibigan	Sheila
2011	The Jose and Wally Show Starring Vic Sotto	Janna
2012	Valiente	Leona Braganza
2013	Kidlat	Xyra
2015	Kapamilya, Deal or No Deal	Briefcase Number 18
2015	Pinoy Big Brother: 737	Herself (Houseguest)

== Modeling career and endorsements ==
=== TV commercials ===
Year	Company
2010	Tanduay

=== Endorsements ===
Year	Company
2011	Skin Central
2011–present	Dr. Steve Mark Gan of Gan Advanced Osseointegration Center
