= Montemaria Shrine =

Roman Catholic pilgrimage site in Batangas, Philippines

Montemaria International Pilgrimage & Conference Center

Project
- Owner: Archdiocese of Lipa

Location
- Interactive map of Montemaria Shrine
- Coordinates: 13°38′32″N 121°02′36″E
- Location: Barangay Pagkilatan, Batangas City, Batangas, Philippines

The Montemaria International Pilgrimage & Conference Center simply known as Montemaria is a township project and pilgrimage site in Batangas City, Batangas, Philippines. It is the site of the Mother of All Asia – Tower of Peace, the tallest statue of the Virgin Mary in the world.

== History ==
View from Batangas Bay.

The site of Montemaria, was originally a project of Mary Mother of the Poor Foundation of Roman Catholic priest Fernando Suarez. Suarez got the idea of developing a pilgrimage site from Hermilando Mandanas, a local politician and acquaintance whom he met in 2006, where the priest could perform his faith healing work. Mandanas' company, Abacore Capital Holdings, Inc., donated the five-hectare land in Barangay Pagkilatan where the statue and the proposed pilgrimage site would stand, which would later be called Montemaria.

Initial progress for the project was made in 2009 after Suarez's foundation was able to raise ₱200 million. But in the following year, the project was later put on hold after Suarez moved to Cavite, where San Miguel Corporation (SMC) offered him a 33-hectare land in the town of Alfonso where he could set up a bigger pilgrimage site. Suarez ran a pilgrimage site in Cavite until development of the area was stopped in 2014 due to challenges of Suarez's foundation in fulfilling conditions of its donation agreement with the SMC. The associated property was returned to SMC.

Mandanas continued the Montemaria project in Batangas City and established the Montemaria Asia Pilgrims Inc. (MAPI) in 2013 to help him manage the Montemaria development. The Montemaria property was later set for donation to MAPI but such plans were canceled and the land was donated to the Archdiocese of Lipa instead.

== Facilities ==
The first building built at the Montemaria Shrine is the Santo Niño Chapel, a replica of the Church of Our Lady Victorious in Prague, prior to the 2010s. A collossal statue of the Virgin Mary was originally part of the plan for Montemaria when Suarez was still involved in the project. Construction work for the statue, now known as the Mother of All Asia – Tower of Peace began in 2014. and was completed by 2021.
