= The Victor (statue) =

Statue in Pasig, Philippines

- The Victor in 2024
- Location: Bridgetowne, Pasig, Metro Manila, Philippines
- Coordinates: 14°35′36.3″N 121°04′59.8″E
- Designer: Jefrë
- Material: Perforated steel
- Height: Statue: 55 meters (180 ft); Including podium: 60 meters (200 ft)
- Opening date: August 2023
- Dedicated to: John Gokongwei and the "Global Filipino"

The Victor is a colossal statue at the Pasig portion of Bridgetowne in Metro Manila, Philippines.

== Installation ==
Robinsons Land announced in 2019 that it would be installing a colossal statue at Bridgetowne, its own township spanning Pasig and Quezon City. Named The Victor, the statue was projected to be the "tallest lighting projection" in the world. The Victor was unveiled in August 2023.

== Statue ==
The Victor was designed by Filipino-American artist Jefrë. It is mainly made from marine-grade perforated steel art from China. It stands 55 meters (180 ft) on a 5 m (16 ft) podium. It weighs 299.37 tonnes (660,000 lb).

It has a translucent surface that can be lit up with various colors at night through projection mapping.

The Victor is a tribute to Filipino businessman John Gokongwei (1926–2019). The statue depicts a man with one arm raised as if it is celebrating a victory. Jefrë also dedicates the statue to the "global Filipino".

== See also ==
- List of tallest statues
