= Mother of All Asia – Tower of Peace =

Statue of the Virgin Mary in Batangas City, Philippines

- The statue as viewed on November 3, 2018
- Interactive map of Mother of All Asia – Tower of Peace
- Location: Montemaria, Barangay Pagkilatan, Batangas City, Philippines
- Coordinates: 13.6423°N 121.0433°E
- Designer: Eduardo Castrillo
- Type: Statue
- Height: 98.15 m (322.0 ft)
- Beginning date: 2014
- Completion date: 2021
- Opening date: 2021
- Dedicated to: Virgin Mary (Mother of All Asia)
- Website: montemaria.com.ph

The Mother of All Asia – Tower of Peace is a monument shrine dedicated to the Virgin Mary as a symbol of unity and peace in Asia and the whole world. It is located at the center of the eight-hectare pilgrimage site called Montemaria International Pilgrimage & Conference Center in Sitio Montemaria, Barangay Pagkilatan, Batangas City, Philippines. It is the world's tallest statue of the Virgin Mary at 98.15 m (322.0 ft) which includes the plinth/building it stands on.

== History ==
The construction of a statue of the Virgin Mary and pilgrimage site at the Montemaria development in Batangas City was originally planned and pursued by the Mary Mother of the Poor Foundation (MMP) led by Catholic priest Fernando Suarez. Suarez got the idea of developing a pilgrimage site from Hermilando Mandanas, a local politician and acquaintance whom he met in 2006, where the priest could perform his faith healing work. Mandanas' company, Abacore Capital Holdings, Inc., donated the five-hectare land in Barangay Pagkilatan where the statue and the proposed pilgrimage site would stand, which would later be called Montemaria.

Initially, progress for the project was made in 2009 after Suarez's foundation raised ₱200 million. But in the following year, the project was later put on hold after Suarez moved to Cavite, where San Miguel Corporation offered him a 33-hectare land in the town of Alfonso where he could set up a bigger pilgrimage site. Cited as the one responsible for building a statue of the Virgin Mary at Montemaria, Mandanas continued the project. They established the Montemaria Asia Pilgrims Inc. (MAPI) to help him manage the project's development. The property where the statue would stand was later set for donation to MAPI but such plans were canceled and the land was donated to the Archdiocese of Lipa instead. At the time, the statue which had its face and hands already complete became known as the "Mary Mother of All Asia".

Construction work for the statue began in 2014 and was completed by 2021. It is planned to be inaugurated as part of the 500th anniversary of the introduction of Christianity in the Philippines but the COVID-19 pandemic has stalled such plans.

== Design ==
The Mother of All Asia's hands and face was designed by sculptor Eduardo Castrillo and is made of concrete and steel. With a height of 98.15 m (322.0 ft), the Marian statue surpassed the Virgin of Peace statue in Venezuela to become the tallest statue of the Virgin Mary in the world.

The monument has occupiable floors with a floor area of around 12,000 m^{2} (130,000 sq ft). A place of worship, the St. John Paul II Shrine, is hosted on the ground floor of the monument. Other facilities hosted in the monument are reception halls and 20 Marian chapels on the third floor, a food hall on the fourth floor, two mini theaters on the fifth floor, conference rooms as well as a balcony featuring flags of the countries of Asia on the sixth floor, and a view deck situated on the 15th floor. The seventh to 10th floors hosts commercial and residential spaces.

== See also ==
- List of tallest statues in the Philippines
- List of tallest statues
