= St. Vincent Ferrer Statue =

Statue in Bayambang, Philippines

- The statue in January 2020
- Interactive map of St. Vincent Ferrer Statue
- Location: Bayambang, Pangasinan, Philippines
- Coordinates: 15°49′11″N 120°26′39″E
- Designer: JQS Builders
- Type: Statue
- Material: Steel framing, reinforced by bamboo cladding
- Height: 50.23 meters (164.8 ft)
- Completion date: 2019
- Dedicated to: Vincent Ferrer
- Website: www.vivasanvicenteferrer2019.com

The St. Vincent Ferrer Statue is a colossal bamboo statue in the town of Bayambang in Pangasinan, Philippines. It is dedicated to the town's Catholic patron saint, Vincent Ferrer (1350–1419), and is recognized by the Guinness World Records as the tallest bamboo sculpture in the world.

== History ==
=== Conception ===
The town of Bayambang in 2014 became known for setting the world record for the tallest sculpture. The Guinness World Records recognized the feat after the local government led the preparation of a 8 kilometers (5.0 mi) barbeque as part of the town's 400th founding anniversary celebrations. The Bayambang municipal government planned to set a second world record and initially considered breaking the world record for the most number of sky lanterns flown set by Iloilo City which saw the setting off of 18,000 lanterns. The Bayambang government planned to fly 40,000 sky lanterns in 2016 but such plans were scrapped after the Department of Environment and Natural Resources banned such activity in the Philippines due to environmental concerns.

The idea of constructing the St. Vincent Ferrer Statue is credited by the town's Mayor Cezar Quiambao to his wife Mary Clare Phyllis Quiambao who learned online of a bamboo structure about 30 meters (98 ft) high being constructed in Myanmar. The couple are also devotees of the saint having got married at the St. Vincent Ferrer Parish Church of Bayambang. The construction of the statue was an attempt to set a first time Guinness world record for the tallest bamboo statue. Guinness has set conditions in order for the statue to be given the world record recognition such as a publicly undisclosed minimum height and the perquisite that the statue's exterior be made primarily of bamboo.

=== Construction and inauguration ===
The groundbreaking ceremony for the whole St. Vincent Ferrer Prayer Park, the site of the statue took place on June 20, 2018. The construction of the St. Vincent Ferrer Statue took around ten months which involved 608 men and a woman. The prayer park project including the statue is privately funded by the Kasama Kita sa Barangay Foundation.

An adjudication was held in the morning of April 5, 2019 to determine the actual height of the statue by Guinness World Records and confirm its world record claim. The whole prayer park was inaugurated and opened to the public at night of the same day where the St. Vincent Ferrer Statue was declared as the world's tallest bamboo statue. The date coincided with the 400th anniversary of the founding of the Saint Vincent Ferrer Parish as an institution and the 600th anniversary of the death of the saint to whom the statue is dedicated.

== Monument ==
The St. Vincent Ferrer Statue is dedicated to Vincent Ferrer, a saint venerated in Roman Catholicism who is also the patron saint of Bayambang. The structure is made from bamboo supported by a steel frame structure in its interior. In particular, 60 tons of engineered bamboo were imported from China and 600 tons of steel were used to build the statue. The statue is supported by a 7.5 meters (25 ft) deep foundation which devised 768.99 cubic meters (27,157 cu ft) of 6,000 psi cement. The structure is designed to be able to withstand a typhoon.

The detailed design of the statue was made by JQS Builders through 3D polygon technology. while the steelworks fabrication and design was made by Far East Industrial Supply & Co. and by the RAA Architects Engineers and Consultants. Covered with 22,626 bamboo panels, the statue lacks curvatures and consists of around 5,000 polygons with the construction of the statue's head depicting the saint's curly hair with around 700 polygons being the most tedious.

The official height of 50.23 meters (164.8 ft) was confirmed by Guinness World Records by Swapnil Dangarikar, an adjudicator from India. This value includes the statue and its base; the statue figure is 42 m without its base.

== See also ==
- List of tallest statues in the Philippines
- List of tallest statues
