= Jefrë =

Filipino-American visual artist

- Born: Jefre Figueras Manuel; Chicago, United States
- Education: Art Institute of Chicago; Ohio State University
- Notable work: The Jax (proposal)
- Website: jefre.org

Jefre Figueras Manuel, commonly known by the mononym Jefrë, is a Filipino-American visual artist based in Orlando, Florida.

== Early life and education ==
Jefre Figueras Manuel was born and raised in Chicago to Filipino parents who settled in the United States in the 1970s. His mother is a nurse from Santo Domingo, Ilocos Sur while his father is an accountant from San Pedro, Laguna. Jefrë's parents also had part-time jobs in design; his father did landscape contracting and design and his mother created wedding flower arrangements.

He initially pursued a degree in medicine for his collegiate studies. He later took courses at the Art Institute of Chicago and attended Ohio State University to study urban design and planning.

== Career ==
He first worked for Skidmore, Owings & Merrill in the 1990s. After he had a heart attack in 2007 or 2008 at age 35, he decided to set up his own organization, Studio Jefrë (StudioJEFRë), and pursued a career in public art. He did various projects involving community design, public art, parks and plazas, sculpture, temporary installations, interior design, avant-garde landscapes, eco-installations, and campus planning. He also joined competitions as well.

His works has been in public display in various cities in the United States such as Miami, New Orleans, Philadelphia, Orlando, and San Antonio as well as in London and Abu Dhabi. He has also done works in the Philippines as well.

== Notable works ==
Jefrë is also the designer of the 15.54 m (51.0 ft) tall The Jax stainless steel sculpture to be built at the former site of Jacksonville Landing in Jacksonville, Florida. The artwork received mixed local reception. It has been a subject of a petition to stop its conception.

He also did works that are publicly displayed in the Philippines. This includes Time in SM Megamall along EDSA, a mirror stainless steel sculpture of a human figure with a box head to convey the idea to value time in the context of the being stuck in traffic and portray people as "building blocks" of a city. Other works include the Talking Heads at the Five Ecom Center Building at the SM Mall of Asia complex and the Sculpture Contour Series which consist of painted statues of a tamaraw, a tarsier, a rooster and an eagle in SM Aura Premier in 2016. In 2018 he did the Tree of Life fiberglass sculpture installed at Robinsons Place Naga in Naga, Camarines Sur. In 2023, The Victor a 55 m (180 ft) light installation in Bridgetowne was completed.

In 2021, Jefrë's Bayani, at DoubleDragon Meridian Park and Pag-asa along EDSA were unveiled by DoubleDragon Corporation's Edgar “Injap” Sia II who dedicated these treasures to the Filipino youth.

In 2024, Jefrë designed the MMFF trophy featuring a silver figurine with an upper torso of film reel and filmstrip.
