= Divine Mercy de Cebu =

- Location: Consolacion, Cebu, Philippines
- Designer: Stephen Ralota (initial design); Felino Palafox (lead architect)
- Height: 39.6 m (130 ft)
- Beginning date: 2020; 5 years ago
- Completion date: 2021; 4 years ago
- Dedicated to: Jesus Christ (as the Divine Mercy)
- Website: divinemercydecebu.com

The Divine Mercy de Cebu or the Divine Mercy Shrine is a proposed Roman Catholic monument in Consolacion, Cebu, Philippines. It is dedicated to Jesus Christ as the "Divine Mercy".

== History ==
=== Conceptualization ===
The family of former Consolacion Mayor Avel Gungob, Sr., donated 6.3 hectares (16 acres) of land in barangay Garing to the Archdiocese of Cebu, which would later be the future site of the Divine Mercy Shrine. After the property was acquired by the Cebu archdiocese in 2015, its lay association, the Shrine of the Divine Mercy de Cebu Foundation, Inc. (SDMCFI), launched a design contest for the Divine Mercy Shrine, with a jury consisting of priests and lay workers selecting the winning design among 15 entries. The winning entry was entitled "The Holy Bible" by Stephen Ralota, who relayed to Archbishop Jose S. Palma that he wished that reputed architect Felino Palafox execute his design.

In 2017, Palma talked with Palafox regarding the Divine Mercy project, after Palma officiated a Mass in a civic club meeting which had the latter as guest speaker. The Palafox Architecture Group became involved and also donated ₱4 million for the Divine Mercy project.

The SDMCFI was authorized by the Archdiocese of Cebu to oversee the Divine Mercy Shrine project.

=== Construction ===
The SDMCFI greenlit the construction of the Divine Mercy Shrine by January 2020 and the Palafox Architecture Group projected that the monument will be complete by March 2021, a month prior to the quincentenary of the Christianization of the Philippines.

== Architecture and design ==
The design of the Divine Mercy Shrine, dubbed "The Holy Bible". is being executed by renowned architect Felino Palafox . The team of architects involved in the initial design took into account the diary of Polish nun and saint, Faustina Kowalska for the color and design of the Divine Mercy statue. Kowalska's experience with the apparitions of Jesus Christ inspired devotion to the Divine Mercy.

The Divine Mercy Shrine will be built on a 6.3 hectares (16 acres) property in Barangay Garing in Consolacion, Cebu. The shrine will feature a 39.6 m (130 ft) monument of the Jesus Christ and a 6.4 m (21 ft) cross will be erected near the monument. The Divine Mercy image will face East and will overlook the Cebu International Seaport and Mactan Cebu International Airport, and will be built at an elevation of 243.8 m (800 ft).
