= Divine Mercy Statue (Bulacan) =

Statue in the Philippines

- Interactive map of Divine Mercy Statue
- Location: National Shrine of the Divine Mercy, Marilao, Bulacan, Philippines
- Coordinates: 14°46′37.8″N 120°58′35.2″E
- Height: 30.48 meters (100.0 ft), 45.72 meters (150.0 ft) with its pedestal
- Beginning date: 2016; 10 years ago
- Opening date: January 19, 2017; 9 years ago
- Dedicated to: Jesus Christ (as the Divine Mercy)

The Divine Mercy Statue in Marilao, Bulacan, is a 45.72 m (150.0 ft) Roman Catholic monument to Jesus Christ as the Divine Mercy. It is the tallest statue of the Divine Mercy in the Philippines.

== History ==
The Divine Mercy Statue was an idea by Filipino priest Próspero Tenorio, who is also secretary-general of the Asian office of the World Apostolic Congress on Mercy (WACOM), as well as the rector and parish priest of the National Shrine of the Divine Mercy.

Construction of the statue began in January 2016 and it was unveiled on January 19, 2017 as part of the 4th WACOM congress – the first time it was held in Asia. This was despite the project only being 70 percent complete, with finishing touches to be done on the statue's neck and shoulders.

A Mass was held as part of the inauguration, with Nigerian Bishop Martin Uzoukwu officiating in lieu of Malolos Bishop José Francisco Oliveros, who by then was weakened by prostate cancer. The Mass was attended by around 5,000 people.

At the time of its inauguration, it was the tallest statue of the Divine Mercy in the Philippines.

== Architecture and design ==
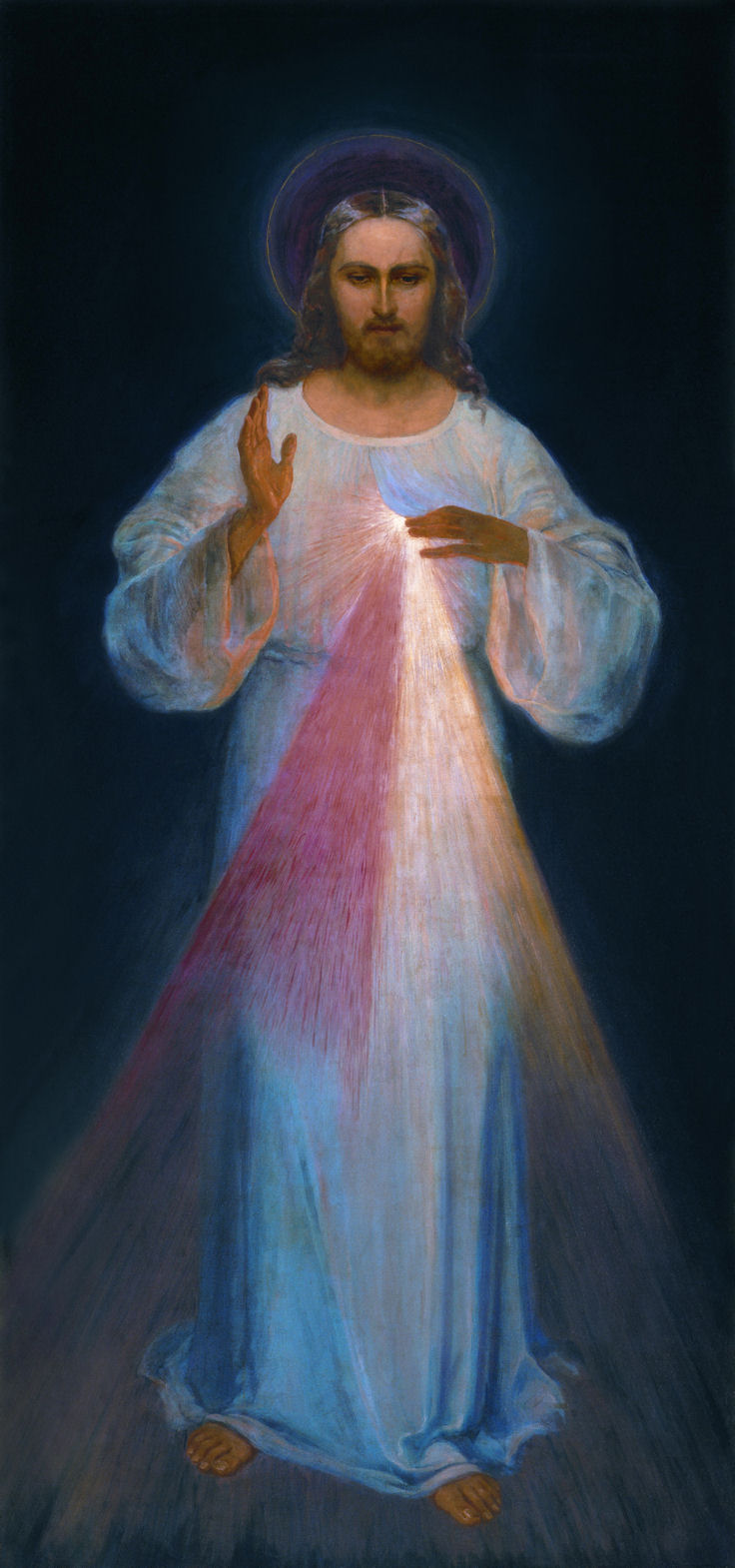
The original 1934 image painted by Kazimirowski as advised by Saint Faustina, restored in 2017.

The Divine Mercy Statue is found within the grounds of the National Shrine. The structure, which has a total height of 45.72 metres (150.0 feet), consists of the statue itself standing at 30.48 meters (100.0 ft), and the building serving as its podium which is 15.24 meters (50.0 ft) tall. The building contains a multi-purpose hall and a dormitory.

The statue’s features are based on the first rendition of the Divine Mercy image by Eugeniusz Kazimirowski – the only version Saint Faustina Kowalska supervised and saw in her lifetime. This 1934 “Vilnius image” was converted into a digitally sculpted model, which was printed in sections using large format 3D printing. These were then coated in fibreglass to weatherproof the statue.

Local construction, architectural, and engineering firm V.B. Columna was commissioned for the project.
