= Bridgetowne =

Real estate development in Manila, Philippines

- Office buildings in Bridgetowne

Project
- Opening date: September 2019
- Developer: Robinsons Land Corporation
- Owner: Robinsons Land Corporation

Physical features
- Transport: 16 18 36 39 41 50 56 59 65 Ortigas Avenue; 2 SM IPI; 7 Ortigas Avenue; Future: 4 Tiendesitas; 3 Opus Mall; Bridgetowne Ferry Station

Location
- Interactive map of Bridgetowne
- Coordinates: 14°35′35″N 121°5′3″E
- Country: Philippines
- Region: Metro Manila
- Address: Eulogio Rodriguez Jr. Avenue (C-5 Road)

Bridgetowne is a real estate development spanning the border of Pasig and Quezon City in Metro Manila, Philippines. It is a mixed township and business park situated in a former industrial area on both banks of the Marikina River near the junction of Eulogio Rodriguez Jr. Avenue (C-5 Road) and Ortigas Avenue (R-5 Road). The 30.61-hectare (75.6-acre) masterplanned community is the first integrated township project by Robinsons Land Corporation, the real estate arm of JG Summit. It is currently anchored by four office towers in its information technology park dedicated to the business process outsourcing sector, its second in Metro Manila after Robinsons Cybergate in Mandaluyong. Once completed, the township will be a community consisting of seven office towers, a shopping mall, five-star hotel and residential condominiums, with a landmark bridge and a light art installation called The Victor as its centerpiece.

== Location ==
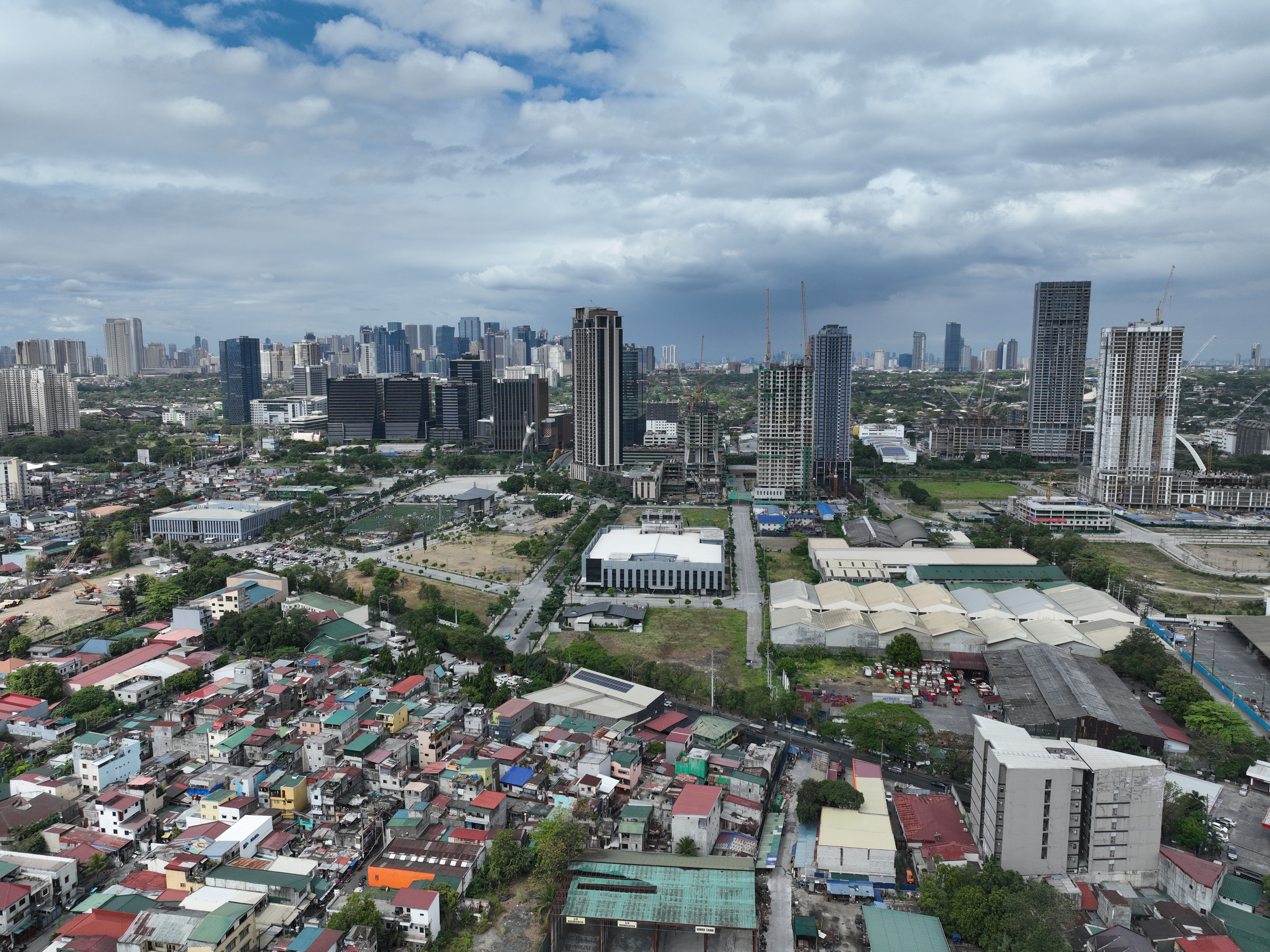
Aerial view of Bridgetowne as seen from Rosario

Bridgetowne straddles the border between Quezon City and Pasig and is divided into two tracts by the Marikina River. The majority of the development, the 22.56-hectare (55.7-acre) Bridgetowne East, sits on the eastern bank of the river within an area of Pasig administered as part of the villages of Rosario and Manggahan .This area bounded by Amang Rodriguez Avenue to the east is a densely populated residential and industrial area in close proximity to the Manggahan Floodway. The 8.05-hectare (19.9-acre) Bridgetowne West occupies the Quezon City side of the township where it is bordered by Eulogio Rodriguez Jr. Avenue (C-5 Road) to the west. This area in Ugong Norte is a major transportation corridor that links Ortigas Center and Eastwood City. It neighbors the Parklinks development on both banks of the Marikina River to the north and the Alaska Land IT Center to the south, with Green Meadows and Valle Verde gated villages forming its western border across C-5. The township is also a stone's throw from Ortigas East, The Grove by Rockwell and Arcovia City mixed-use developments of C-5 just south of Ortigas Avenue. In September 2019, Robinsons Land inaugurated the 200-meter-long (660 ft) arch bridge connecting its two sides across the Marikina River that also serves as an alternate route between C-5 and Amang Rodriguez Avenue.

== History ==
The township under construction, May 2017

Bridgetowne is a redevelopment of several former industrial properties along the Marikina River in Rosario and Ugong Norte. The eight-hectare Quezon City property was acquired by Robinsons Land in 2011, two hectares of which was purchased from Republic Glass Holdings Corp. which operated a glass manufacturing facility at the location. In April 2013, Robinsons Land announced a ₱30 billion business park development for the property, its second after the Robinsons Cybergate development. The company topped off its first office building in the eight-hectare Bridgetowne Business Park in Quezon City, the 20-storey Tera Tower, in November 2014.

On September 5, 2019, the business park was rebranded as simply Bridgetowne, Robinsons Land's first township in the country, now covering 30.61 hectares (75.6 acres). The 200-meter (660 ft) long Bridgetowne Bridge also opened to the public linking its Quezon City IT park component to the new 22.56-hectare (55.7-acre) Pasig redevelopment site added to the township. The Pasig property covers the former Rosario Plant, a food processing plant of JG Summit subsidiary Universal Robina, and Litton Knitting Mills, a 7-hectare (17-acre) textile manufacturing complex which stood at the site since 1954 and which JG Summit purchased in the 1970s.

In December 2019, another hectare was added to the township through a joint acquisition of the former Red Ribbon Bakeshop commissary on C-5 Road adjacent to the property by Robinsons Land and DoubleDragon Properties.

== Developments ==
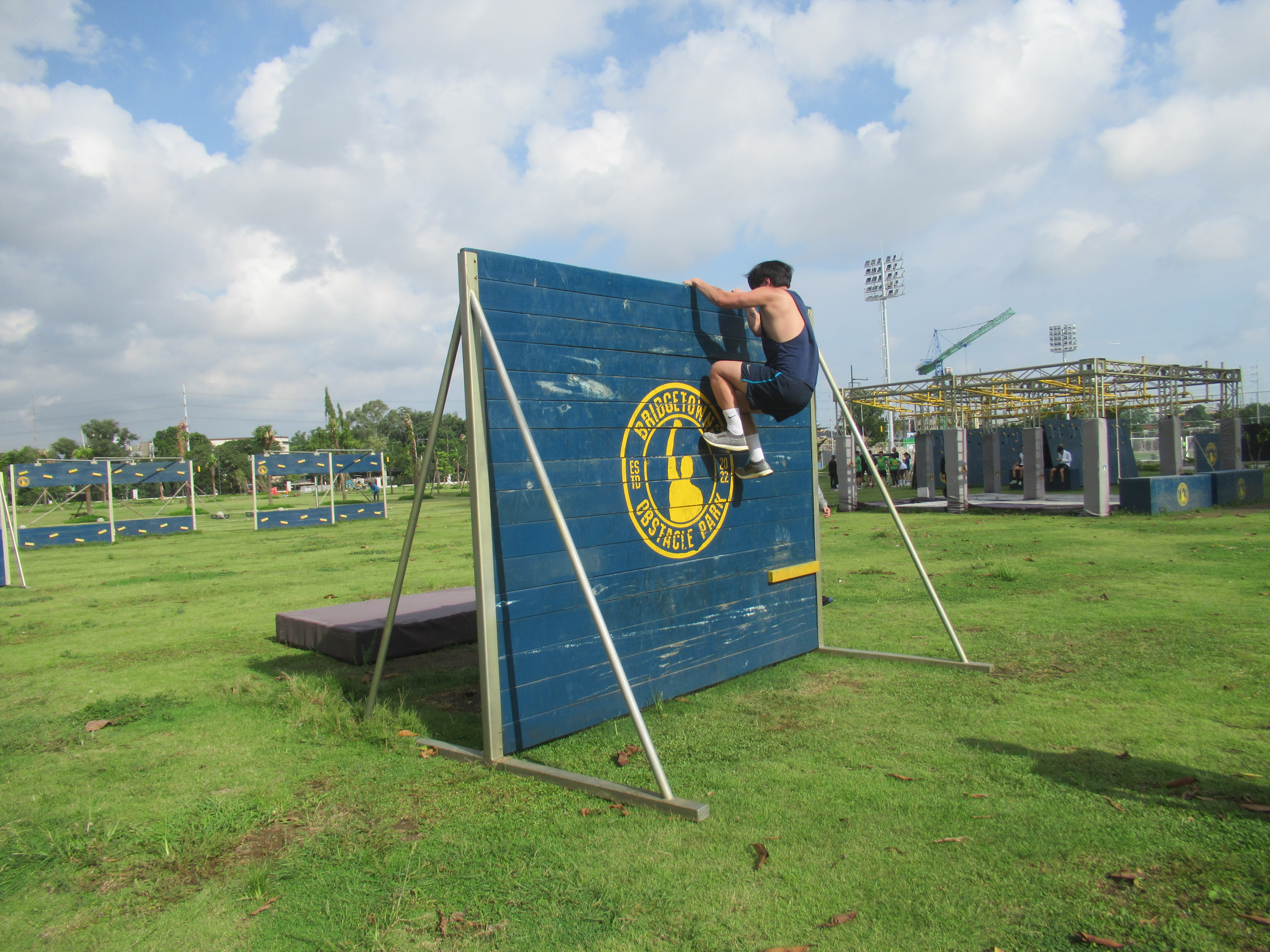
Obstacle Park

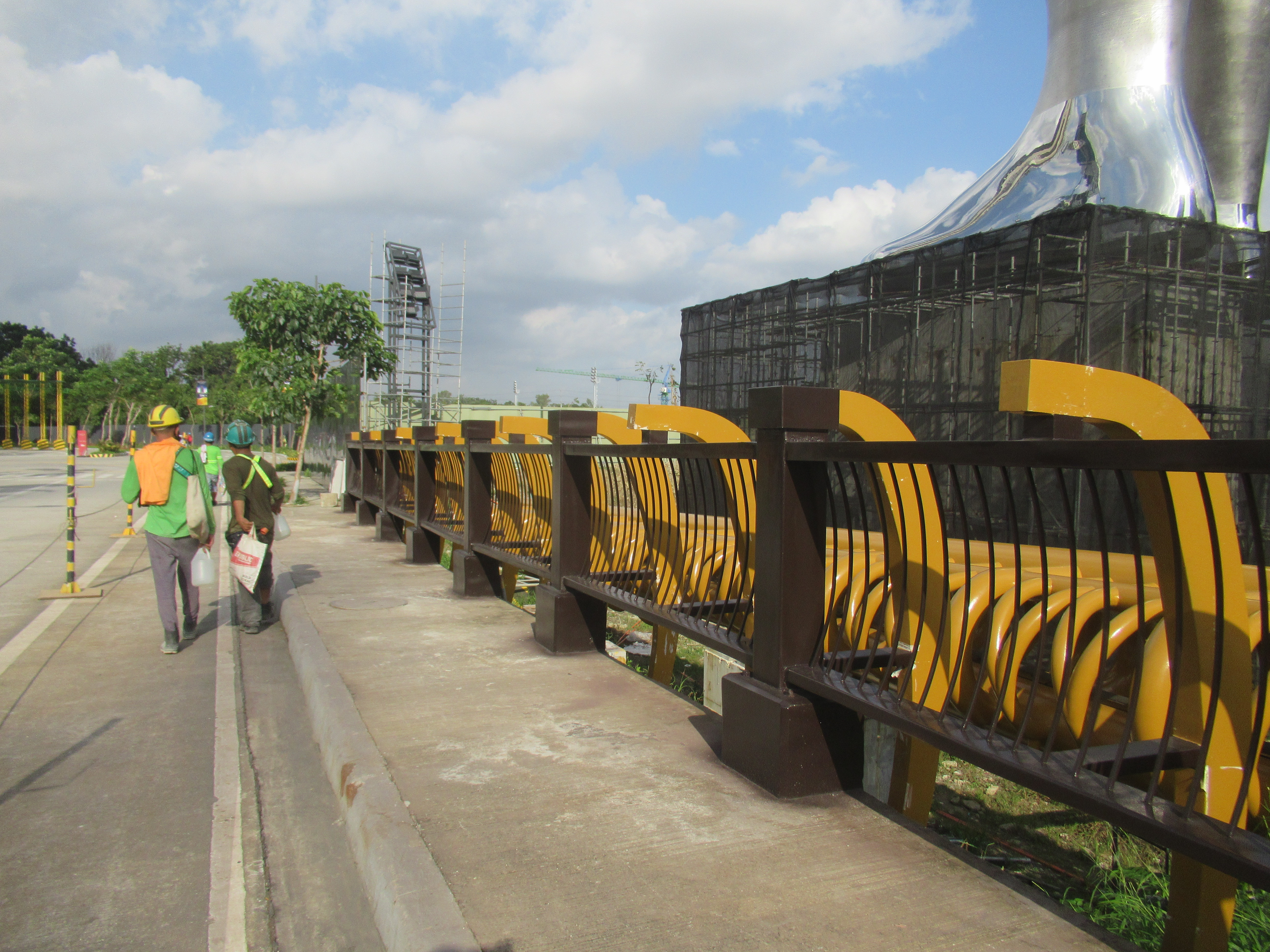
Enhancement of the iconic yellow bridge at the foot of The Victor

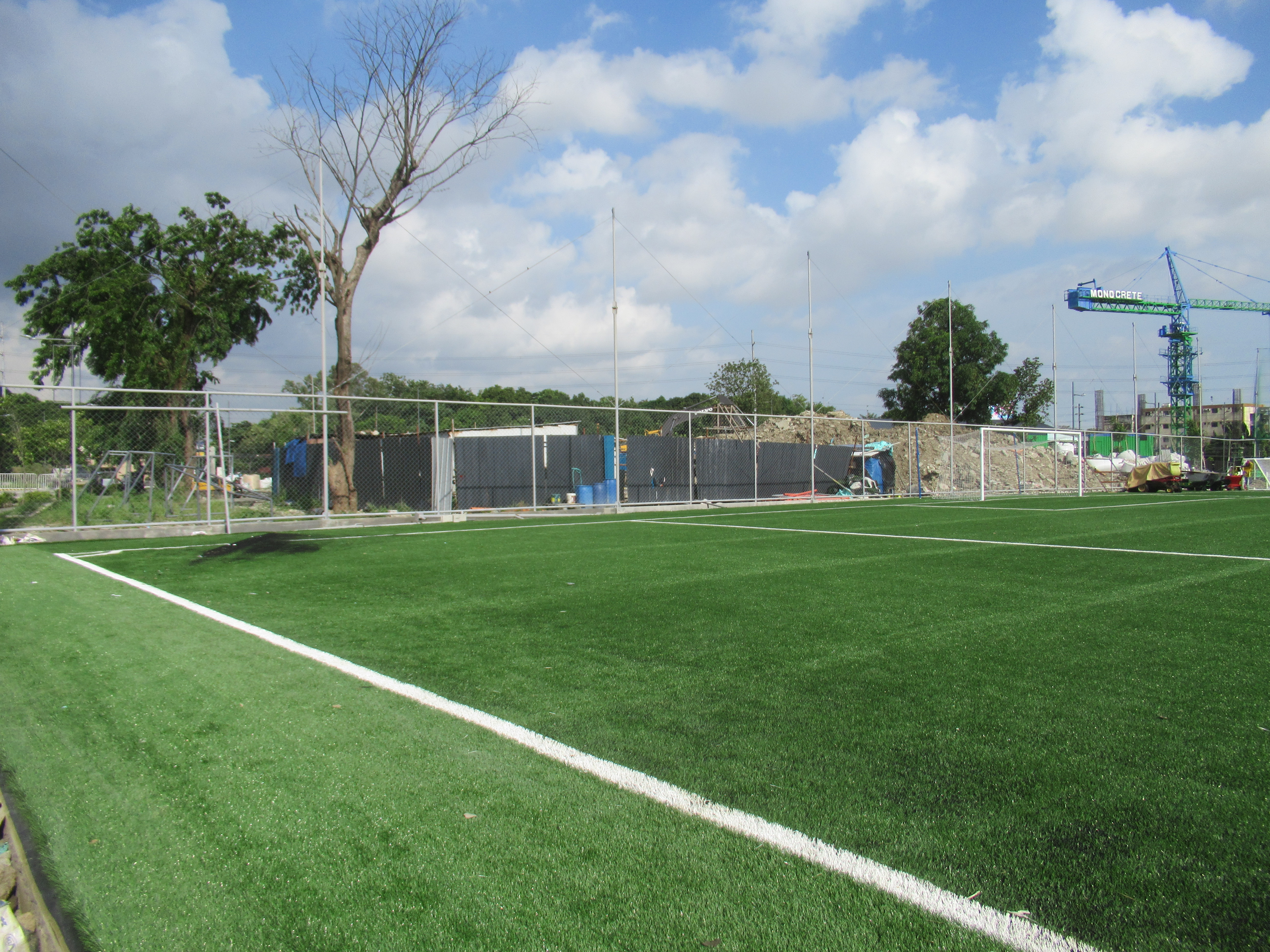
Association football fields

=== Opus Mall ===
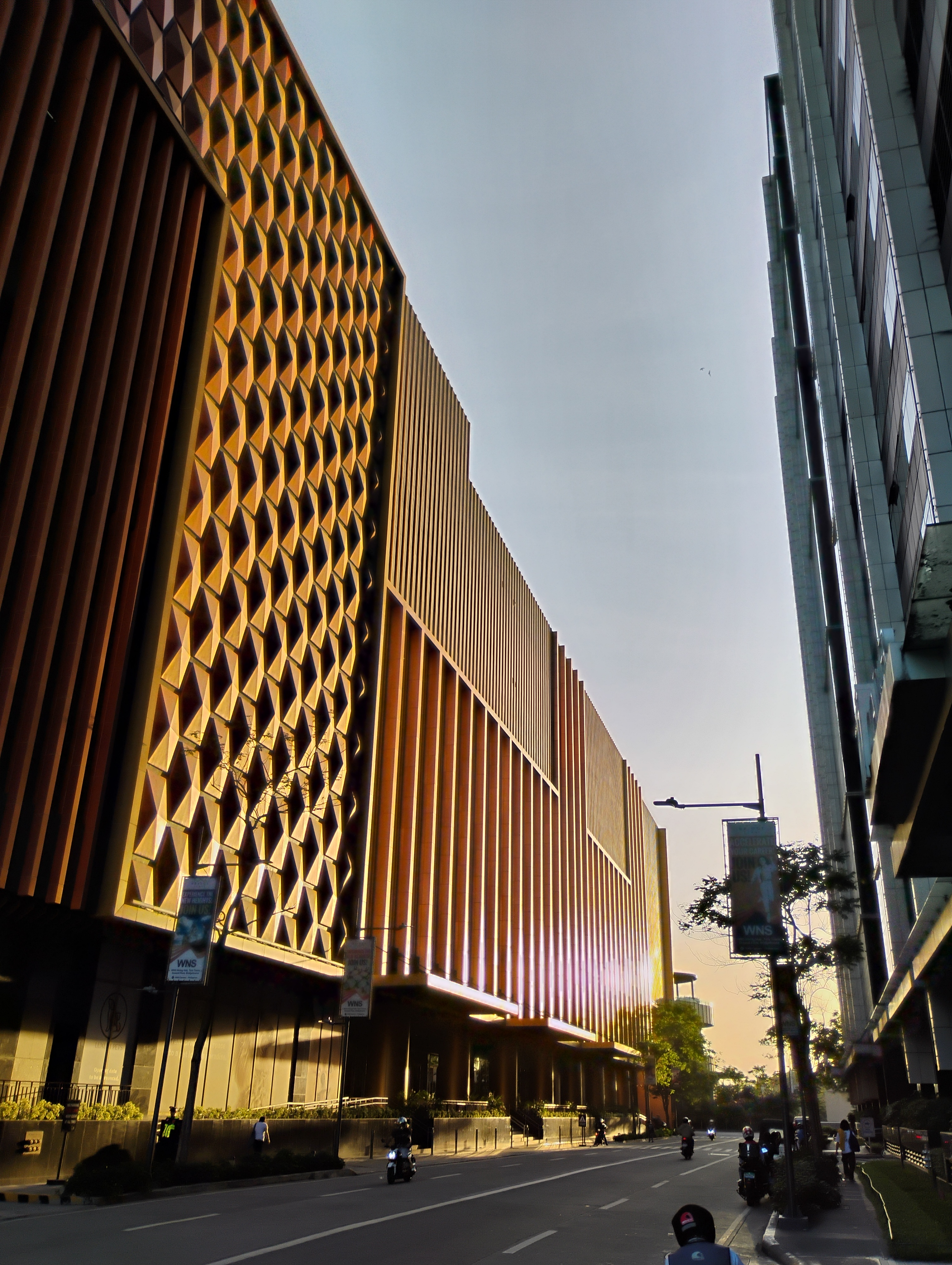
Opus Mall along Tera Drive

The mall opened on July 3, 2024, after being delayed due to the COVID-19 pandemic. Formerly named Robinsons Bridgetowne, it is an upscale retail development developed and managed by Robinsons Malls, located on the Quezon City side of the development. It also serves as the podium of the upcoming Fili Hotel, its first branch in Metro Manila and the second overall after NUSTAR in Cebu.

The six-storey luxury shopping center hosts the Marketplace, shops and restaurants, a recreational hub, five state-of-the-art digital cinemas (including the first ever Family Cinema), a food hall, central garden and the Chapel of the Archangels (a Roman Catholic chapel).

=== Robinsons DoubleDragon Square ===
A redevelopment of the former one hectare (2.5 acres) Red Ribbon Bakeshop commissary building on C-5 Road by the 50-50 percent joint venture of Robinsons Land and DoubleDragon Properties. The ₱2 billion mixed retail and office development will occupy two-thirds of the Red Ribbon lot and will provide 103,000 square meters (1,110,000 sq ft) of gross leasable space.

=== The Victor ===
The Victor is a 55-meter-tall (180 ft) steel statue designed by Filipino-American artist Jefrë at the foot of the Bridgetowne Bridge. The colossal public art piece is the tallest lighting projection art installation in the world.

=== Home of the UAAP ===
The tentatively-named Home of the UAAP will be the "central hub" for events hosted by the University Athletic Association of the Philippines. The 8,074-capacity venue began construction on October 24, 2025 and will open in 2027.

=== Helios Pickleball Center ===
Helios Pickleball Center will be a sports complex that will feature 25 professional-grade pickleball courts across an area of 17,500 square meters (188,000 sq ft), including a separate court designed to host events such as the Professional Pickleball Association Tour. The building is the first project of Robinsons Sports, Entertainment and Recreation, the recreational division of Robinsons Land, and is being built through a joint venture with Kosmas Athletic Ventures Corporation at a construction cost of ₱1 billion. It is expected to open in 2027.

=== Office developments ===
Bridgetowne West is a Philippine Economic Zone Authority-registered IT park that is planned to contain seven office towers catering to the business process outsourcing industry. In February 2020, Robinsons Land started construction on its first office development in Bridgetowne East.

==== Campus One ====
Robinsons Land announced its first office tower development for the Bridgetowne East property in Pasig in February 2020. Campus One is a three-story building containing a total leasable space of 19,578 square meters (210,740 sq ft) and houses the headquarters of FinAsia Land Development and Construction Corp.

==== Tera Tower ====
Tera Tower is a 20-story LEED-registered office building in Bridgetowne West. It is the first office development of Robinsons Land in its eight-hectare cyberpark which was completed in November 2014. It hosts the headquarters of Universal Robina, a sister company of Robinsons Land.

==== Exxa and Zeta Towers ====
Robinsons Land topped off its second office tower in the Bridgetowne cyberpark in February 2018. Zeta Tower, a 20-story green office building, has 35,000 square meters (380,000 sq ft) of office gross leasable area and will also host around 20 retail establishments. A contact center of Hinduja Global Solutions is located at Zeta Tower. Its twin, Exxa Tower, was completed later that year, and now hosts a contact center of American business services company Concentrix.

==== Giga Tower ====
Robinsons Land's fourth office tower development in Bridgetowne is the 29-story Giga Tower located beside Tera Tower. It has a gross leasable area of 35,000 square meters (380,000 sq ft) and houses a contact center of VXI Global.

=== Residential developments ===
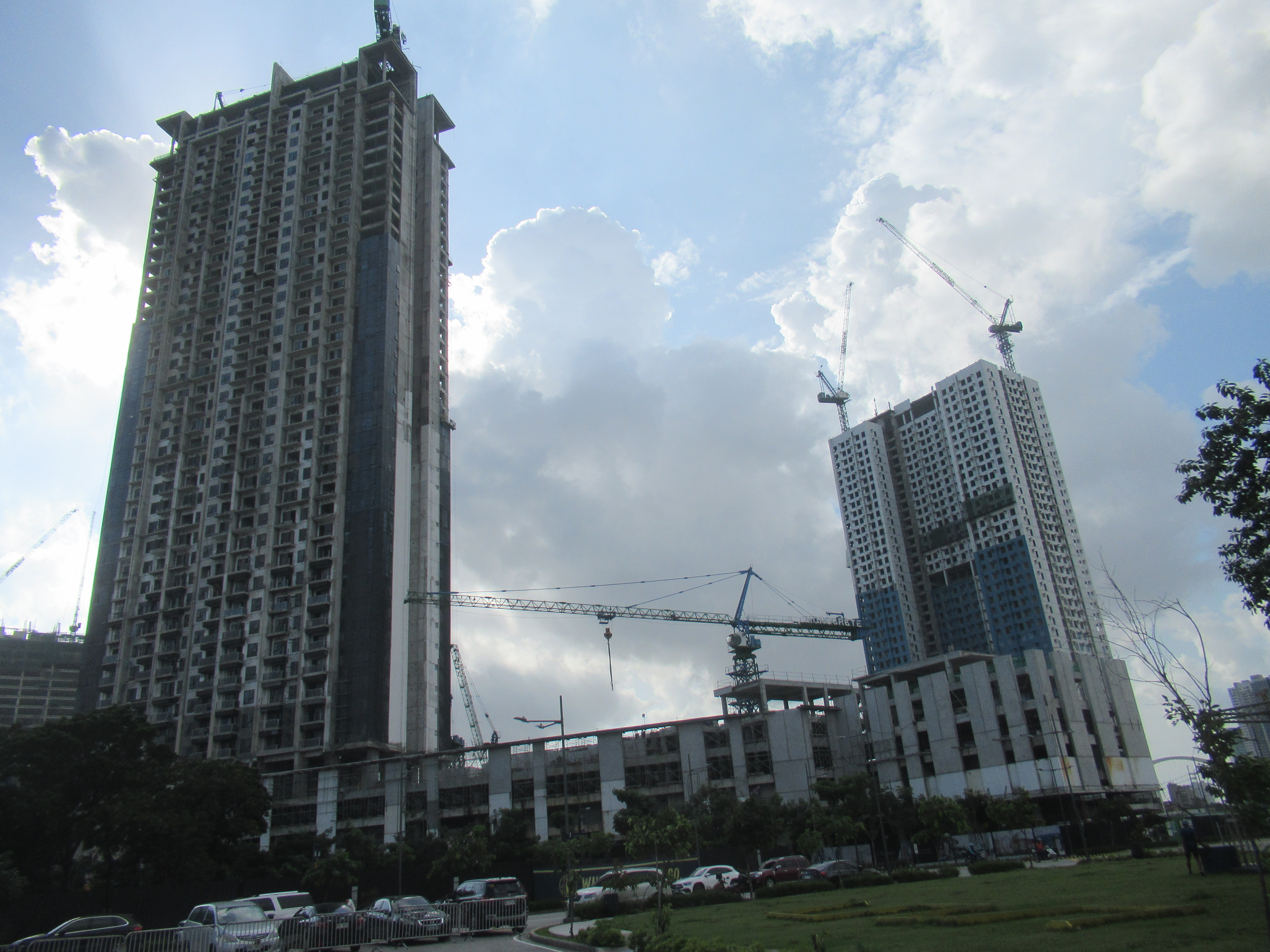
The Velaris (left) and Cirrus Residences (right) under construction

==== Cirrus Residences ====
The Cirrus Residences is a 40-story residential condominium high-rise under construction in the Bridgetowne East section of the township. It is a development of Robinsons Communities and will feature 1,500 studio units.

==== The Velaris Residences ====
The Velaris Residences is a ₱5.6 billion luxury condominium development by RHK Land Corporation, a joint venture of Robinsons Land and Hongkong Land. It is a 45-story glass-and-concrete tower on a 1.7-hectare (4.2-acre) piece of land in Bridgetowne East with a target completion date of 2024.

==== Haraya Residences ====
Haraya Residences, is a twin tower condominium development by Shang Properties and Robinsons Land. The condominium is located in Bridgetowne East. It is Shang Properties' second collaboration with Robinsons Land after Aurelia Residences in BGC.

==== Le Pont Residences ====
Le Pont Residences is an A-grade, 50-story twin tower condominium development. The building will have a parking lot that is Tesla-ready.

==== Hotel101-Libis Bridgetowne ====
In July 2023, DoubleDragon Properties announced that it would build a branch of its Hotel101 brand, named Hotel101-Libis Bridgetowne. The proposed hotel with 702 rooms is envisioned to be the biggest in Quezon City. It is built on a 2,547-square-meter (27,420 sq ft) lot of Bridgetowne District, across Opus Mall.

==== Fili Bridgetowne ====
In October 2024, Lance Gokongwei launched the construction of Fili Bridgetowne, the first and only Filipino five-star hotel, under his Robinsons Hotels and Resorts. It connects to the new Opus Mall.

== Transportation links ==
The area will be served by the planned Tiendesitas station of the planned MRT Line 4.

Starting September 10, 2026, the development will also be served by the electric Love Bus service's Robinsons Galleria - Eastwood route.

== See also ==
- Greenhills
- Araneta City
- Eastwood City
- Parklinks
- Ortigas East
- Capitol Commons
- Arcovia City
