= Vincent Ferrer =

Valencian Dominican friar (1350–1419)

Saint Vincent Ferrer OP
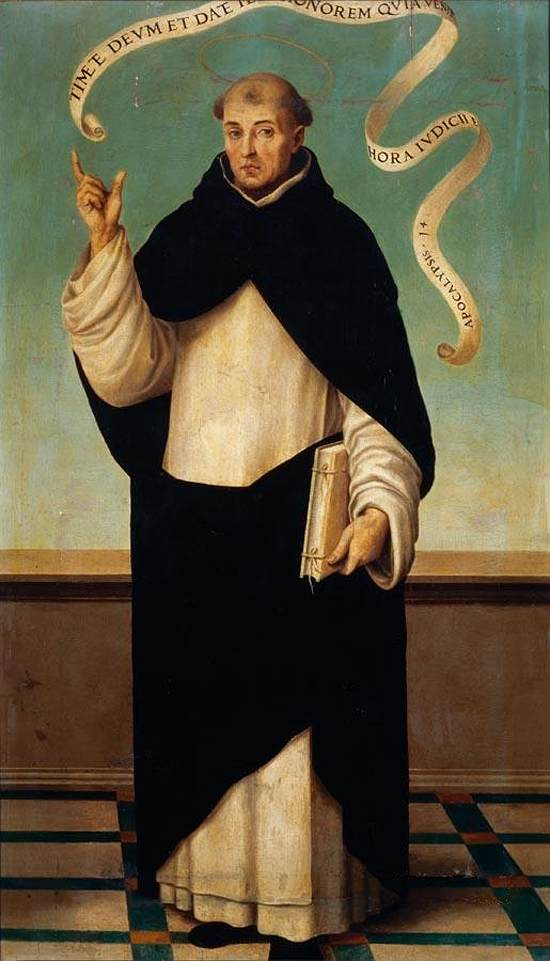
- San Vicente Ferrer by Juan de Juanes

Priest and Confessor
- Born: 23 January 1350; Valencia, Kingdom of Valencia
- Died: 5 April 1419 (aged 69); Vannes, Duchy of Brittany
- Venerated in: Catholic Church; Anglican Communion
- Canonized: 3 June 1455, Santa Maria sopra Minerva, Rome, Papal States by Pope Callixtus III
- Major shrine: Cathedral of Vannes; Vannes, Morbihan, France
- Feast: 5 April
- Attributes: Dominican habit; Tongue of flame; Pulpit; Trumpet; Wings; Bible
- Patronage: Archdiocese of Valencia; Valencia; France; Spain; Cabuyao Laguna, Philippines; Leganes, Iloilo, Philippines; Bayambang, Pangasinan, Philippines; Batad, Iloilo, Philippines; San Dionisio, Iloilo, Philippines; San Vicente, Ilocos Sur, Philippines; Celle di San Vito, Italia; Builders; Prisoners; Construction workers; Plumbers; Fishermen; Spanish orphanages

Vincent Ferrer, OP (Valencian: Sant Vicent Ferrer [ˈsaɱ viˈsɛɱ feˈreɾ]; Spanish: San Vicente Ferrer; Italian: San Vincenzo Ferreri; German: Sankt Vinzenz Ferrer; Dutch: Sint-Vincent Ferrer; French: Saint Vincent Ferrier; 23 January 1350 – 5 April 1419) was a Valencian Dominican friar who gained acclaim as a preacher, missionary and logician. After supporting Antipope Benedict XIII during the Western Schism, Ferrer travelled to preach across Western Europe and the British Isles. His preaching has been credited in some sources as converting 25,000 Jews to Catholicism, due to his zeal and holiness.

== Early life ==
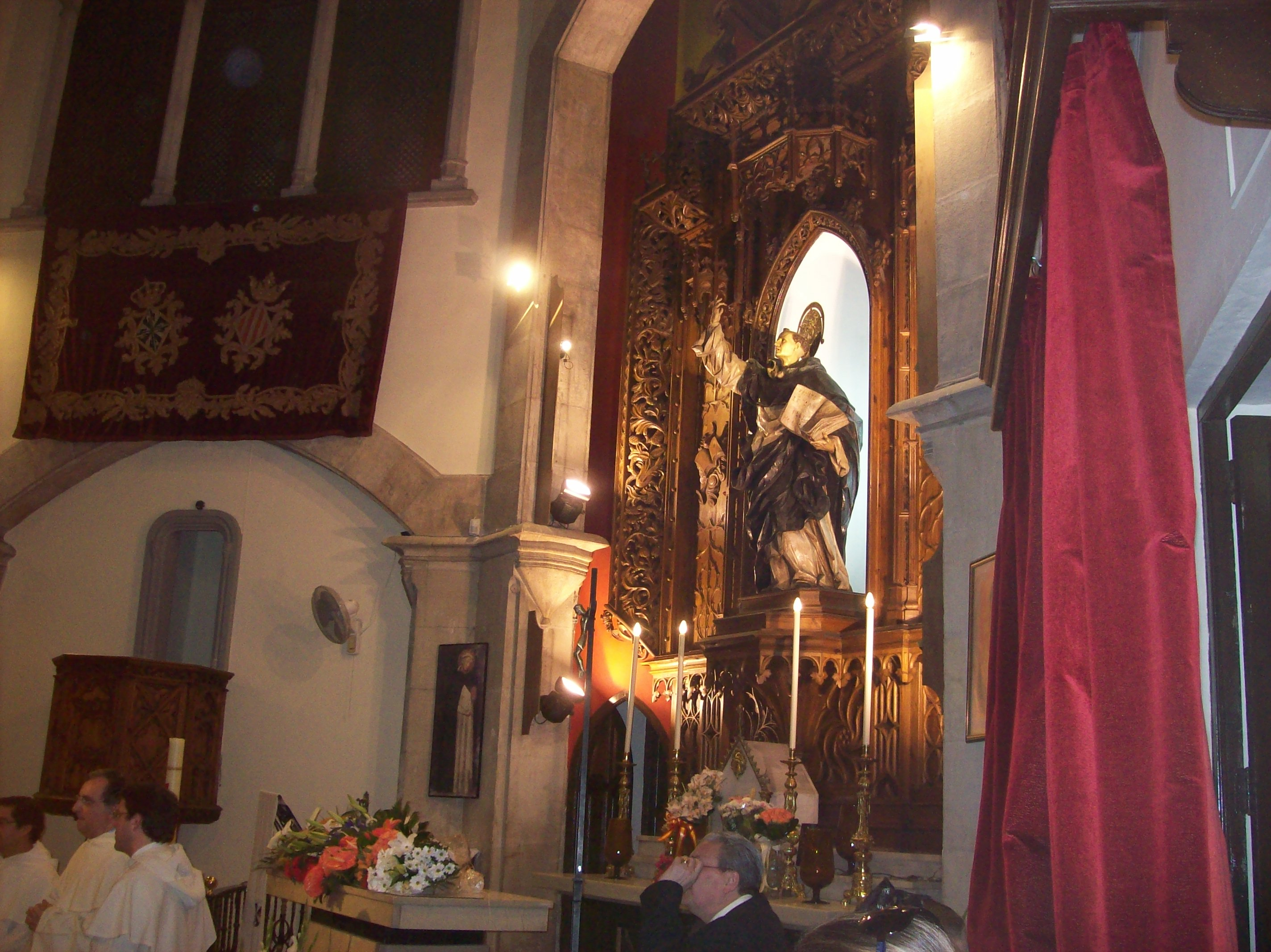
Inside the birthhouse of Vincent Ferrer, Valencia

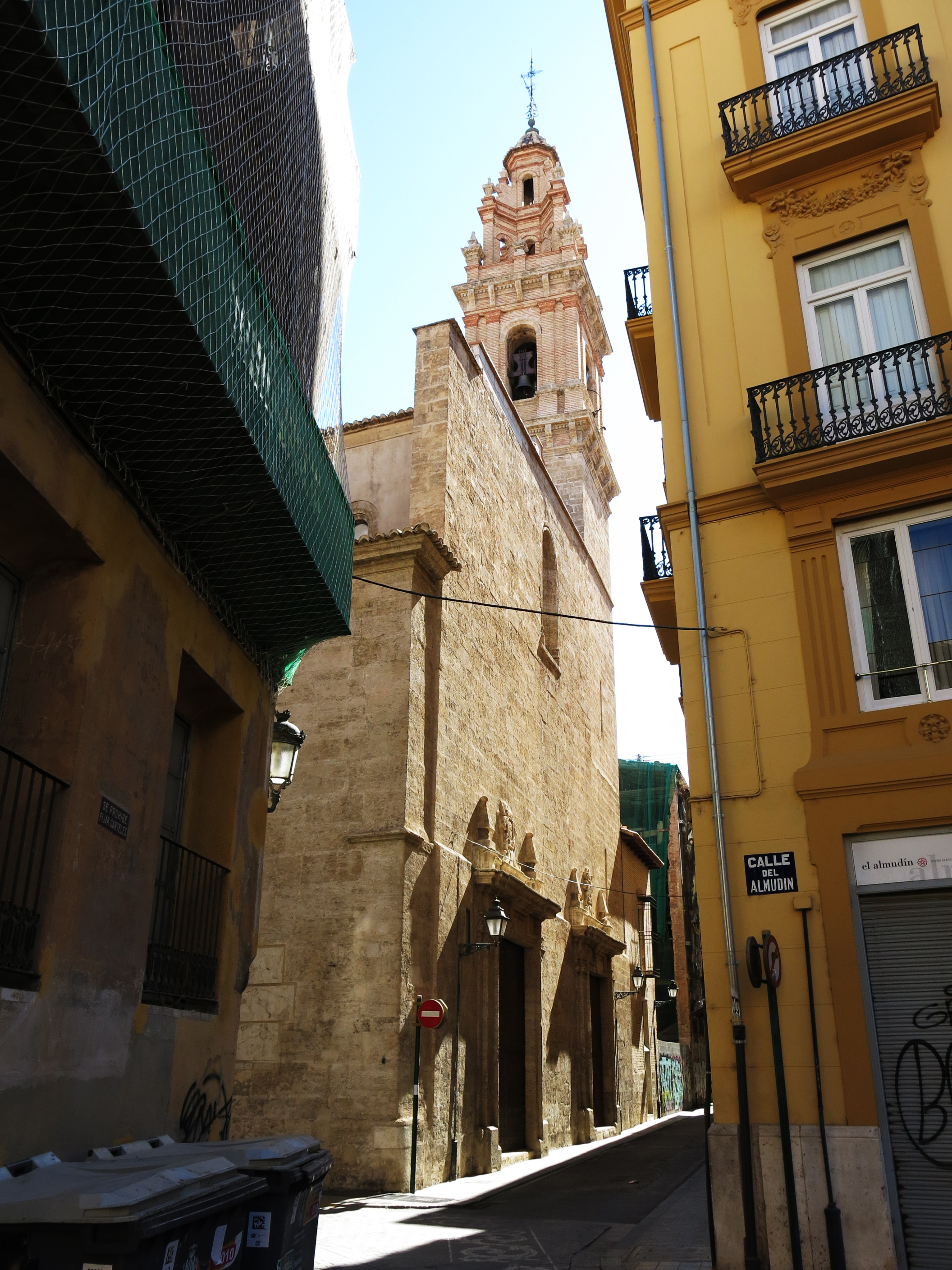
Iglesia de San Esteban in Valencia, where Vincent Ferrer was baptized

Vincent was the fourth child of Guillem Ferrer, a notary from Palamós, and his wife, Constança Miquel, apparently from Valencia itself or Girona.

Legends surround Vincent's birth. It was said that his father was told in a dream by a Dominican friar that his son would be famous throughout the world. His mother is said never to have experienced pain when she gave birth to him. He was named after Vincent Martyr, the patron saint of Valencia. He would fast on Wednesdays and Fridays and distribute alms to the poor. He began his classical studies at the age of eight, and his study of theology and philosophy at fourteen. Four years later, at the age of eighteen, Ferrer entered the Order of Preachers, commonly called the Dominican Order (in England also known as "Black Friars" because of the black cloak they wear over their white habits). As soon as he had entered the novitiate of the Order, though, he experienced temptations urging him to leave. Even his parents pleaded with him to do so and become a secular priest. He prayed and practiced penance to overcome these trials. Thus he succeeded in completing the year of probation and advancing to his profession.

For a period of three years, he read solely Sacred Scripture and eventually committed it to memory. He published a treatise on Dialectic Suppositions after his solemn profession, and in 1379 was ordained a Catholic priest at Barcelona. He eventually became a Master of Sacred Theology and was commissioned by the Order to deliver lectures on philosophy. He was then sent to Barcelona and eventually to the University of Lleida, where he earned his doctorate in theology.

Vincent Ferrer is described as a man of medium height, with a lofty forehead and very distinct features. His hair was fair in colour and tonsured. His eyes were very dark and expressive; his manner gentle. Pale was his ordinary colour. His voice was strong and powerful, at times gentle, resonant, and vibrant.

== Western Schism ==
The Western Schism (1378–1417) divided Catholicism between two, then eventually three, claimants to the papacy. Antipope Clement VII lived at Avignon in France, and Pope Urban VI in Rome. Vincent was convinced that the election of Urban was invalid, although Catherine of Siena was just as devoted a supporter of the Roman pope. In the service of Cardinal Pedro de Luna, Vincent worked to persuade Spaniards to follow Clement. When Clement died in 1394, Cardinal de Luna was elected as the second antipope successor to the Avignon papacy and took the name Benedict XIII.

Vincent and his brother Boniface, General of the Carthusians, were loyal to Benedict XIII, commonly known as "Papa Luna" in Castile and Aragon. He worked for Benedict XIII as apostolic penitentiary and Master of the Sacred Palace. Nonetheless Vincent labored to have Benedict XIII end the schism. When Benedict XIII did not resign as intended at either the Council of Pisa (1409) or the Council of Constance (1414–1418), he lost the support of the French king and of most of his cardinals, and was excommunicated as a schismatic in 1417.

Vincent later claimed that the Western Schism had had such a depressing effect on his mind that it caused him to be seriously ill.

== Religious gifts and missionary work ==
For twenty-one years he was said to have traveled to England, Scotland, Ireland, Aragon, Castile, France, Switzerland, and Italy, preaching the Gospel and converting many. Many biographers believe that he could speak only Valencian, but was endowed with the gift of tongues. He was a noted preacher. Though he himself was an intellectual, his preaching style has been described as "innovative in that it incorporated a popular tone and rhetorical directness into the (by then traditional) Scholastic, thematic sermon structure".

He preached to Colette of Corbie and her nuns, and it was she who told him that he would die in France. Too ill to return to Spain, he did, indeed, die in Brittany in 1419. Breton fishermen still invoke his aid in storms, and in Spain he is the patron of orphanages.

== Conversion of Jews and controversy ==
Vincent is said to have been responsible for the conversion of many Jews to Catholicism, allegedly by questionable means; for instance, he is said to have forcefully consecrated synagogues as churches. A contemporary convert, a former rabbi by the name of Solomon ha-Levi (baptized as Paul), went on to become the Bishop of Cartagena and later the Archbishop of Burgos. Vincent is alleged to have contributed to anti-Semitism in Spain, as commotion accompanied his visits to towns that had Jewish communities.

Because of the methods employed by the Spanish to convert Jews at the time, the means which Vincent had at his disposal were either baptism or spoliation. According to the Catholic Encyclopedia, he won them over by his preaching, converting an estimated 25,000 Jews. Sources are contradictory concerning Vincent's achievement in converting a synagogue in Toledo, Spain, into the Church of Santa María la Blanca. One source says he preached to the mobs, whose riots led to the appropriation of the synagogue and its transformation into a church in 1391; a second source says he converted the Jews of the city who then changed the synagogue to a church after they embraced the faith, but hints at the year 1411. A third source identifies two distinct incidents, one in Valencia in 1391 and one in Toledo at a later date, but says that Vincent put down an uprising against Jews in one place and defused a persecution against them in the other.

Vincent also attended the Disputation of Tortosa (1413–14), called by Antipope Benedict XIII in an effort to convert Jews to Catholicism after a debate among scholars of both religions.

== Compromise of Caspe ==
Vincent participated in the management of a significant political crisis in his homeland. King Martin of Aragon died in 1410 without a legitimate heir, and five potential candidates came forth to claim the throne, all with royal bloodlines. It was determined that a committee of nine respected figures, three each from Aragon, Catalonia, and Valencia (the realms comprising the Crown of Aragon), would review the qualifications and select the next king. Vincent was chosen as one of the representatives of Valencia, and he voted for the Castilian prince Ferdinand of Antequera, who became the next King of Aragon. On 28 June, Ferrer publicly proclaimed Ferdinand of Castile as king of Aragon. The process by which Ferdinand was determined to be the next king is known as the Compromise of Caspe.

== Death and legacy ==
Vincent died on 5 April 1419 at Vannes in Brittany, at the age of 69, and was buried in Vannes Cathedral. He was canonized by Pope Callixtus III on 3 June 1455. His feast day is celebrated on 5 April.

Entities named after him include a pontifical religious institute, the Fraternity of Saint Vincent Ferrer, and two Brazilian municipalities, São Vicente Ferrer, Maranhão, and São Vicente Ferrer, Pernambuco.

A 50-metre (164-foot) statue of Ferrer was erected in Bayambang, Philippines, in 2019.

== See also ==
- Monastery of Sant Jeroni de Cotalba
- Saint Vincent Ferrer, patron saint archive
- Statues of Saints Vincent Ferrer and Procopius, Charles Bridge
