= Bayambang =

Municipality in Pangasinan, Philippines

- Municipality
- Municipality of Bayambang
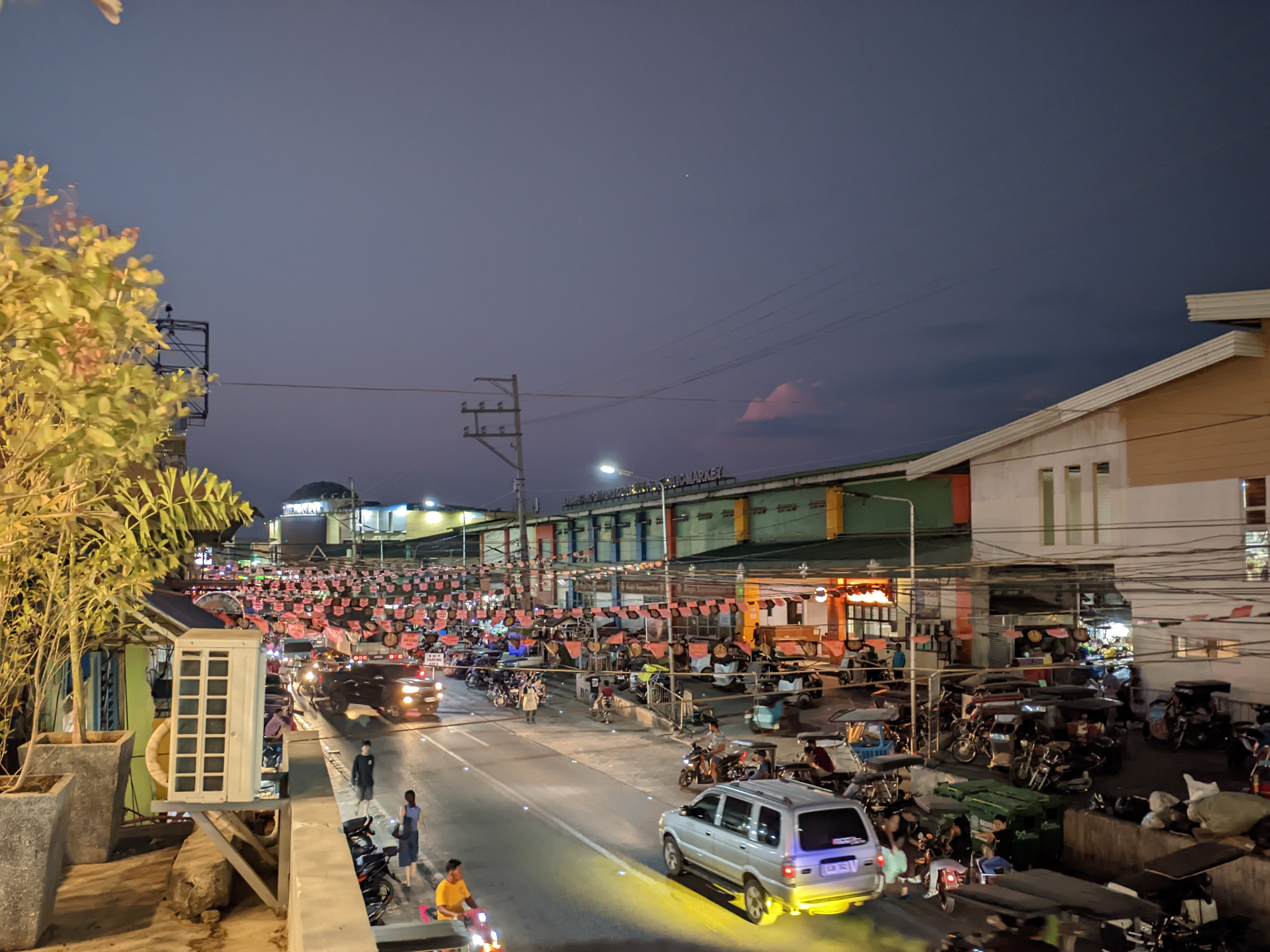
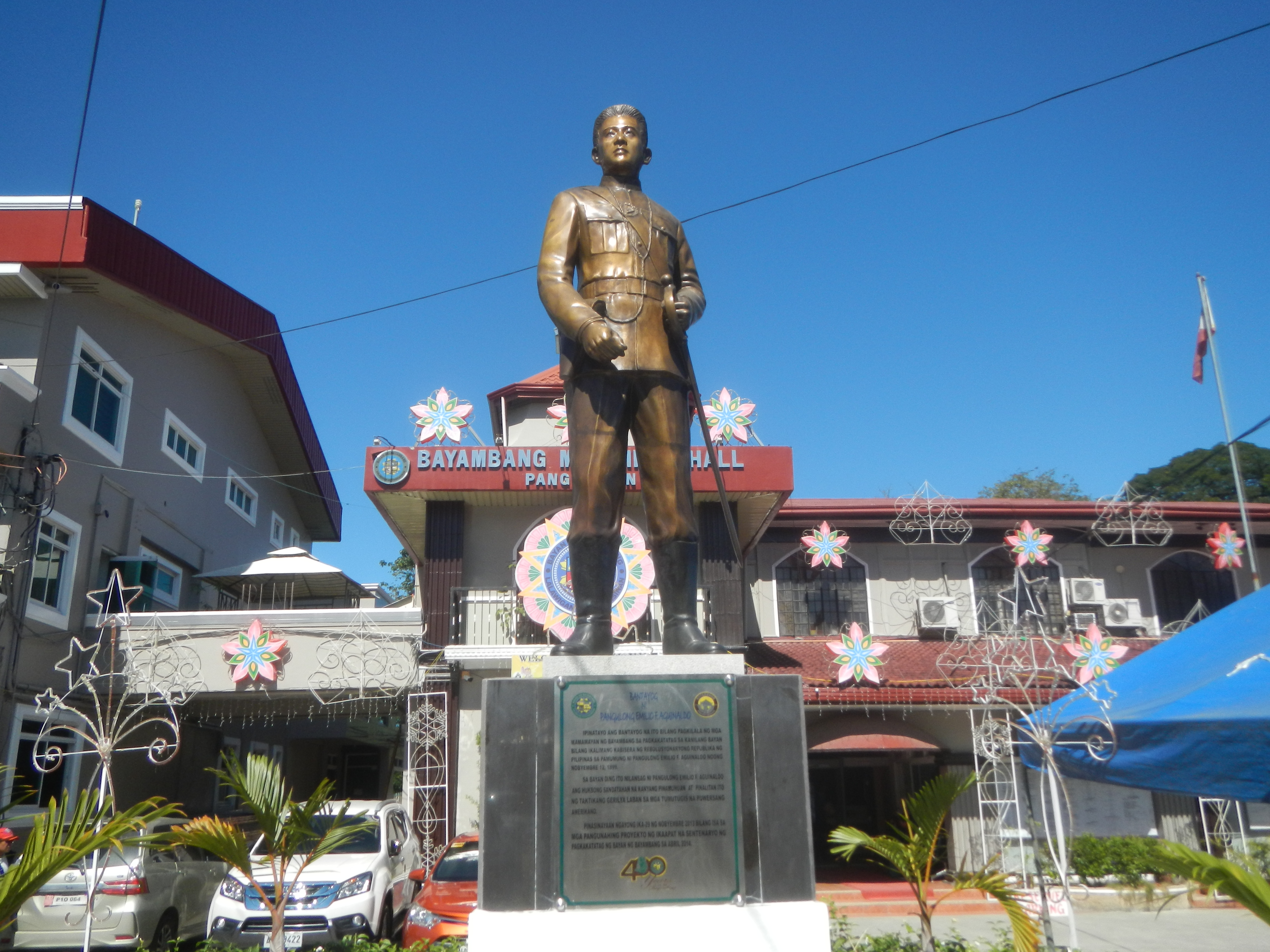
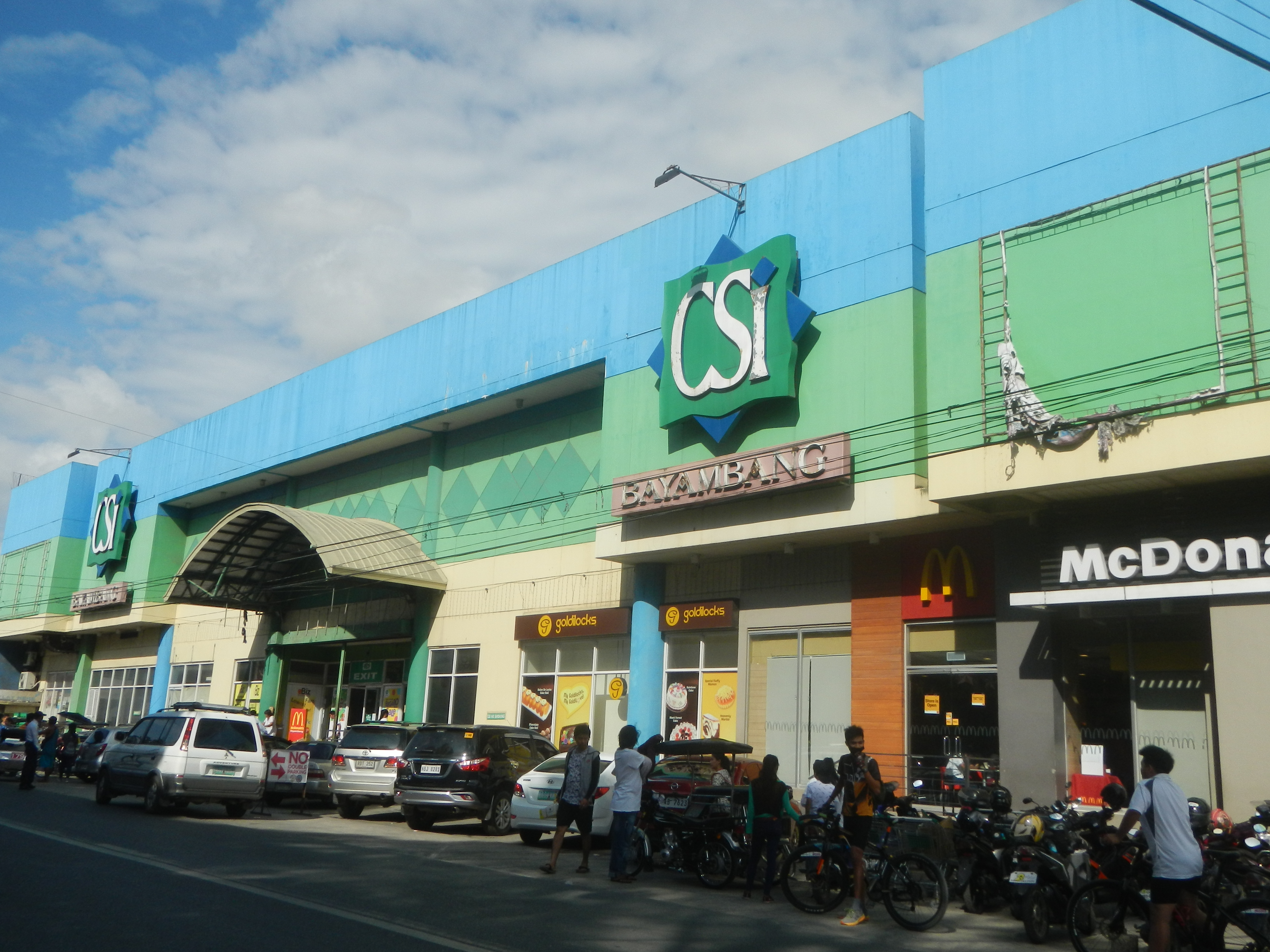
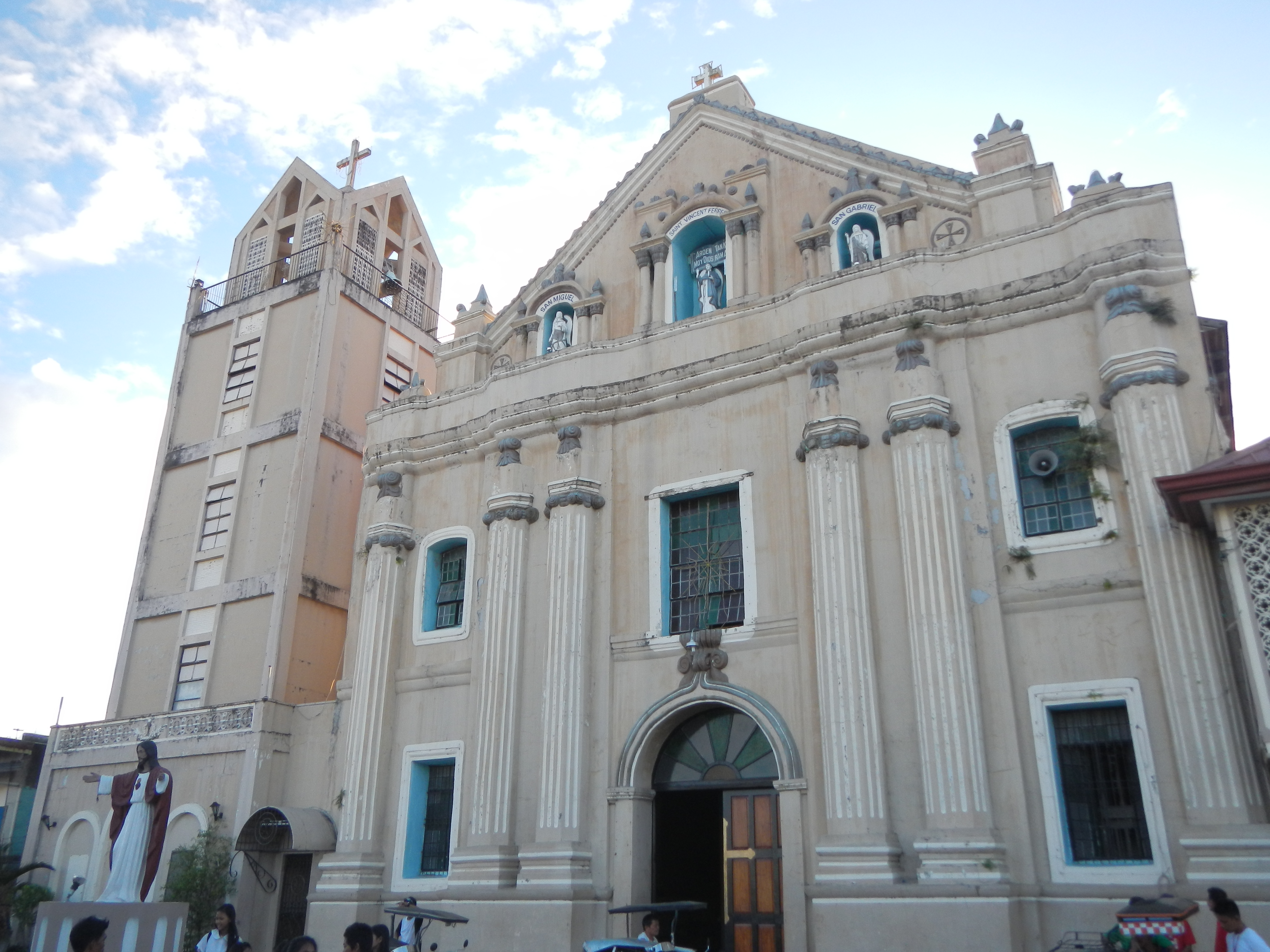
- Clockwise from top: Downtown area along Rizal Avenue, St. Vincent Ferrer Statue at Brgy. Bani, St. Vincent Ferrer Parish Church, CSI Supermarket Bayambang, and Statue of Emilio Aguinaldo in front of the Municipal Hall.

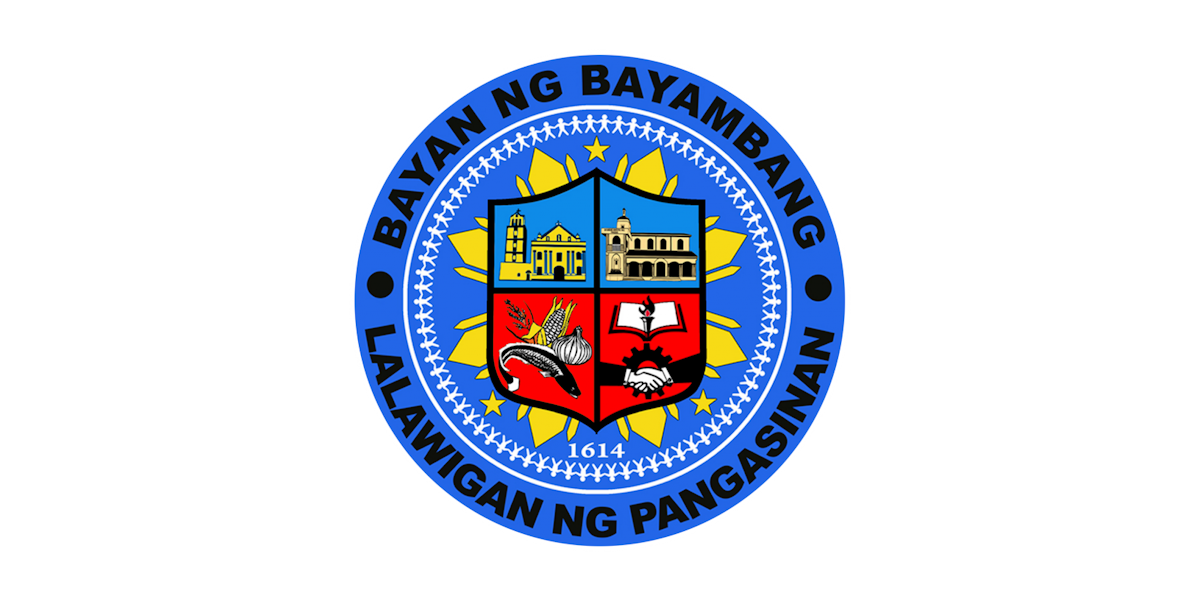
- Flag Seal
- Motto: "Where the Best Things Happen"
- Anthem: Tawir ko, Aroen ko
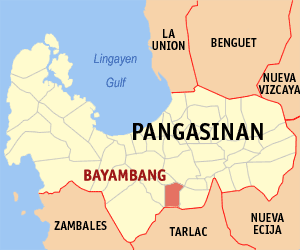
- Map of Pangasinan with Bayambang highlighted
- Interactive map of Bayambang
- Location within the Philippines
- Coordinates: 15°48′32″N 120°27′25″E
- Country: Philippines
- Region: Ilocos Region
- Province: Pangasinan
- District: 3rd district
- Founded: April 5, 1614
- Barangays: 77 (see Barangays)

Government
  - Type: Sangguniang Bayan
  - Mayor: Mary Clare Judith Phyllis J. Quiambao
  - Vice Mayor: Ian Camille C. Sabangan
  - Representative: Maria Rachel J. Arenas
  - Municipal Council: Members: Mylvin T. Junio; Philip R. Dumalanta; Benjamin Francisco S. de Vera; Jose S. Ramos; Amory M. Junio; Gerardo D. Flores; Martin E. Terrado II; Levinson Nessus M. Uy
  - Electorate: 85,383 voters (2025)

Area
  - Total: 143.94 km^{2} (55.58 sq mi)
- Elevation: 20 m (66 ft)
- Highest elevation: 48 m (157 ft)
- Lowest elevation: 11 m (36 ft)

Population (2024 census)
  - Total: 129,506
  - Density: 899.72/km^{2} (2,330.3/sq mi)
  - Households: 30,730

Economy
  - Income class: 1st municipal income class
  - Poverty incidence: 14.8% (2023)
  - Revenue: ₱ 545.3 million (2024)
  - Assets: ₱ 2,125 million (2024)
  - Expenditure: ₱ 545.4 million (2024)
  - Liabilities: ₱ 490.3 million (2024)

Service provider
  - Electricity: Central Pangasinan Electric Cooperative (CENPELCO)
- Time zone: UTC+8 (PST)
- ZIP code: 2423
- PSGC: 0105511000
- IDD : area code: +63 (0)75
- Native languages: Pangasinan; Ilocano; Tagalog
- Feast date: April 5
- Patron saint: Saint Vincent Ferrer
- Website: bayambang.gov.ph

Bayambang, officially the Municipality of Bayambang (Pangasinan: Baley na Bayambang; Ilocano: Ili ti Bayambang; Tagalog: Bayan ng Bayambang), is a municipality in the province of Pangasinan, Philippines. According to the 2024 census, it has a population of 129,506 people.

Baymbang was previously composed of the municipalities of Bautista, Alcala, Santo Tomas, Rosales, Paniqui, Gerona and Camiling. It was founded in the 16th century by Agalet, an Aeta.

The town served as a former seat of the 5th Capital of the Revolutionary Philippine Republic. Bayambang celebrates its Malangsi Fishtival [sic] during the first week of April, locally known as "Kalutan tan Gayaga ed Dalan". It is also home to the Pangasinan State University and its Colleges of Nursing and Education.

== Etymology ==
According to legend, the name of the town came from the name of a plant called "balangbang" (Bauhinia acuminata) which grew in abundance during the early days. "Culibangbang" leaves were used for bulalong Iloko or sinigang. The verdant hills of Bayambang were almost fully covered by these plants. The people made pickles out of them. As the years passed by these plants became extinct in the vicinity, but the name "Bayambang", which sounds like an echo of the plant's name, was retained as the town designation.

Others believed that the name of the town came from the once numerous "Culibangbang" trees which were misunderstood as "Bayambang" by Spanish colonizers.

Telbang (Erythrina variegata), also known as Bagbag in Ilokano and Dapdap in other languages, was the original Bayambang. Bayambang is not a tree but actually a plant named celosia.

== History ==
Benaldo Gutierrez and Honorato Carungay claimed Bayambang was founded in the early 16th century by an Aeta named Agalet. Bayambang was inside Inirangan and Carungay but was re-located to Telbang and southern Poblacion in Old Bayambang.

In 1897, the first "Juez de Cuchillo" executed residents and burned houses. In November 1899 Emilio Aguinaldo designated Bayambang as the Pangasinan capital during the Japanese Regime and the seat of the short-lived Philippine Republic. It was captured by Gen. Arthur MacArthur of Tarlac on October 12, 1899. Jose P. Rizal visited Camiling, Tarlac's Leonor Rivera, since it was formerly a part of Bayambang. Antonio Luna built a camp in Bayambang. Dr. Diaz became Governor under the Japanese Imperial Government and held Office in Bayambang at the Eulogio Dauz residence (junction of Quezon Blvd. And M.H. Del Pilar streets).

Bayambang was the seat of the UNESCO National Community Training Center. Gobernadorcillo Vicente Cayabyab was the first Chief Executive of the town during the Spanish Regime followed by Cabeza de Barangay Mauricio de Guzman. He was succeeded by Honorato Carungay Lorenzo Rodriguez, Julian Mananzan and later Saturnino Evaristo Dimalanta as president.

Lauriano Roldan became the first Civil Government President. He was succeeded by Alvino Garcia, Mateo Mananzan, Gavino de Guzman, Marciano Fajardo, Agustin Carungay, Emeterio Camacho and Enrique M. Roldan.

The Mayors were Gerundio Umengan, Leopoldo Aquino Sr., Ambrosio Gloria (appointed by the PCAU of the Army), Bernardo Lagoy, Leopoldo Aquino Sr. (reelected), Eligio C. Sagun (1952–1955), Don Numeriano Castro (appointed), Salvador F. Quinto (1956–1959), Miguel C. Matabang (1960–1963), Jaime P. Junio (1964–1986), Feliciano Casingal Jr. (OIC), Don Daniel Bato (OIC), Domingo Tagulao, Calixto B. Camacho, Leocadio C. De Vera Jr and Engr. Ricardo M. Camacho.

Dr. Cezar T. Quiambao is the incumbent Municipal Mayor.

On April 5, 2014, in celebration of its 400th anniversary, Bayambang was declared winner of the Guinness World Record for the longest barbecue grill wherein an 8.106-kilometer-long (5.037 mi) interconnected grill pads simultaneously grilled 24,000 kilograms (53,000 lb) of tilapia, beating Turkey's 6.166 kilometers (3.831 mi).

=== Cojuangco claim ===
The Cojuangco's Central Azucarera de Tarlac Realty Corporation (CAT) claims ownership of 386.8-hectare estate in 12 barangays in Bayambang, including the site of the 289-hectare (710-acre) Camp Gregg Military Reservation (declared on October 13, 1903, by the US colonial government, turned over to the Philippines on March 27, 1949, and particularly to the Bureau of Lands on September 29, 1949). The Alyansa ng mga Magbubukid sa Gitnang Luson (AMGL, Peasant Alliance in Central Luzon) opposed the Cojuancos.

== Geography ==
The Municipality of Bayambang is bounded on the north by Malasiqui, Camiling, Moncada on the south, Bautista on the east, Mangatarem on the southeast, and Urbiztondo on the west. Bayambang is the southernmost town in the province of Pangasinan. It is the gateway to Tarlac Province.

The town's terrain varies from rolling hills to plains. The climate is marked by a wet season from June to October and a dry season from November to May.

The town's land area is 16,800 hectares (42,000 acres) that consists of the following:

- Total Agricultural Area: 12,225 hectares (30,210 acres)
- Total Residential Area: 278 hectares (690 acres)
- Total Commercial Area: 9.5 hectares (23 acres)
- Total Institutional Area: 68 hectares (170 acres)
- Forest reserve & Wild Parks: 2,059 hectares (5,090 acres)
- Total Industrial Area: 15.8 hectares (39 acres)
- Open Space: 2,134.7 hectares (5,275 acres)

Bayambang is situated 38.75 kilometres (24.08 mi) from the provincial capital Lingayen, and 179.82 kilometres (111.73 mi) from the country's capital city of Manila.

=== Barangays ===
Bayambang is politically subdivided into 77 barangays, 11 of which are urban barangays and 66 are rural barangays. Each barangay consists of puroks and some have sitios.

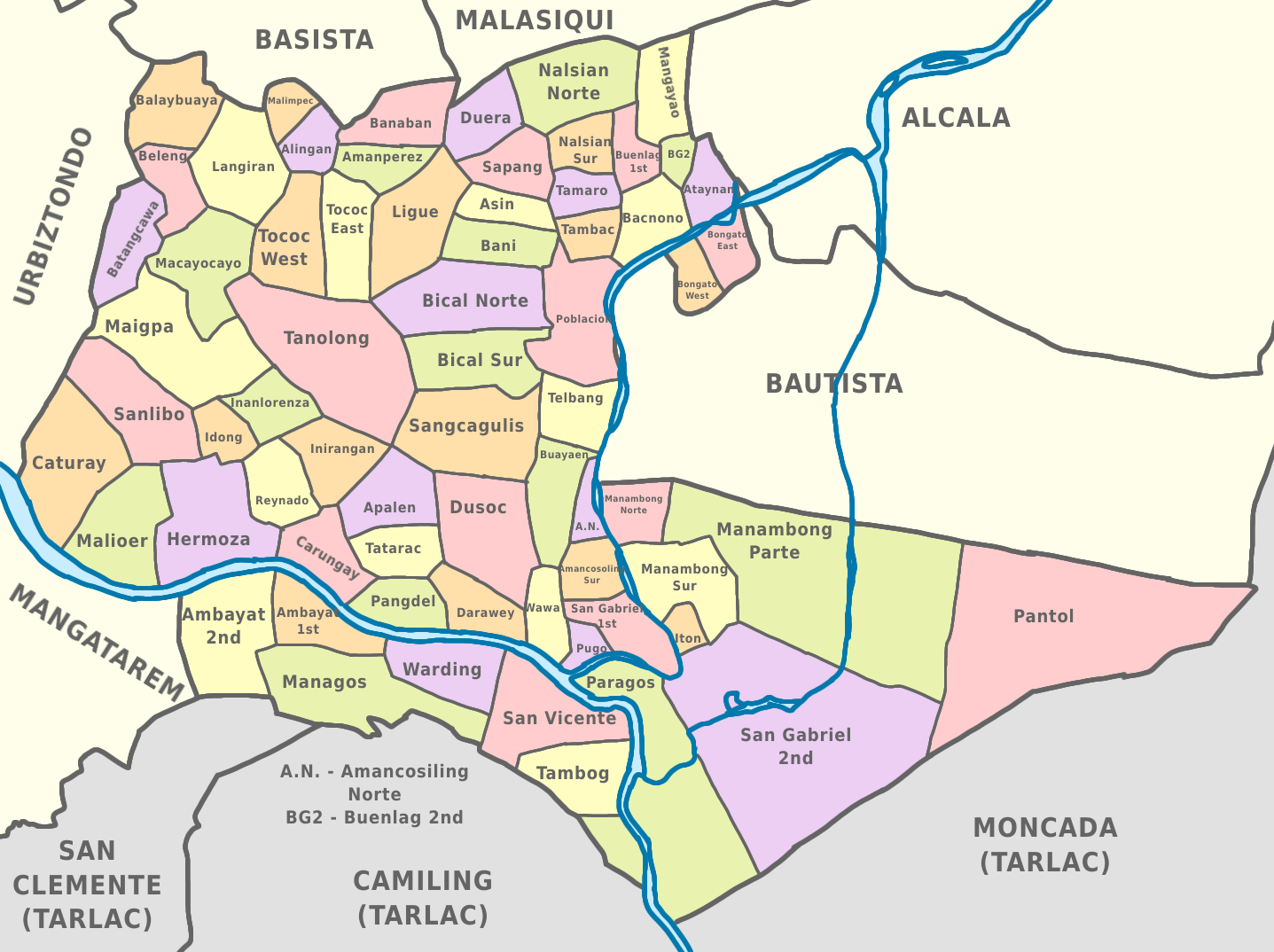
Political divisions of Bayambang

- Alinggan
- Amanperez
- Amancosiling Norte
- Amancosiling Sur
- Ambayat I
- Ambayat II
- Apalen
- Asin
- Ataynan
- Bacnono
- Balaybuaya
- Banaban
- Bani
- Batangcaoa
- Beleng
- Bical Norte
- Bical Sur
- Bongato East
- Bongato West
- Buayaen
- Buenlag 1st
- Buenlag 2nd
- Cadre Site
- Carungay
- Caturay
- Darawey (Tangal)
- Duera
- Dusoc
- Hermoza
- Idong
- Inanlorenza
- Inirangan
- Iton
- Langiran
- Ligue
- M. H. del Pilar
- Macayocayo
- Magsaysay
- Maigpa
- Malimpec
- Malioer
- Managos
- Manambong Norte
- Manambong Parte
- Manambong Sur
- Mangayao
- Nalsian Norte
- Nalsian Sur
- Pangdel
- Pantol
- Paragos
- Poblacion Sur
- Pugo
- Reynado
- San Gabriel 1st
- San Gabriel 2nd
- San Vicente
- Sancagulis
- Sanlibo
- Sapang
- Tamaro
- Tambac
- Tampog
- Tanolong
- Tatarac
- Telbang
- Tococ East
- Tococ West
- Warding
- Wawa
- Zone I (Poblacion)
- Zone II (Poblacion)
- Zone III (Poblacion)
- Zone IV (Poblacion)
- Zone V (Poblacion)
- Zone VI (Poblacion)
- Zone VII (Poblacion)

=== Climate ===
Climate data for Bayambang, Pangasinan
Month	Jan	Feb	Mar	Apr	May	Jun	Jul	Aug	Sep	Oct	Nov	Dec	Year
Mean daily maximum °C (°F)	31 (88)	31 (88)	31 (88)	33 (91)	32 (90)	32 (90)	30 (86)	30 (86)	30 (86)	31 (88)	31 (88)	31 (88)	31 (88)
Mean daily minimum °C (°F)	21 (70)	21 (70)	22 (72)	24 (75)	24 (75)	24 (75)	23 (73)	23 (73)	23 (73)	23 (73)	23 (73)	22 (72)	23 (73)
Average precipitation mm (inches)	5.1 (0.20)	11.6 (0.46)	21.1 (0.83)	27.7 (1.09)	232.9 (9.17)	350.8 (13.81)	679.8 (26.76)	733.1 (28.86)	505 (19.9)	176.6 (6.95)	67.2 (2.65)	17.7 (0.70)	2,828.6 (111.38)
Average rainy days	3	3	3	4	14	18	23	25	22	15	8	4	142
Source: World Weather Online (modelled/calculated data, not measured locally)

== Demographics ==
Population census of Bayambang

Year	Pop.	±% p.a.
1903	11,098	—
1918	15,260	+2.15%
1939	25,578	+2.49%
1948	35,171	+3.60%
1960	47,498	+2.54%
1970	56,415	+1.73%
1975	62,808	+2.18%
1980	64,037	+0.39%

Year	Pop.	±% p.a.
1990	79,027	+2.13%
1995	82,913	+0.90%
2000	96,609	+3.33%
2007	103,145	+0.91%
2010	111,521	+2.88%
2015	118,205	+1.11%
2020	129,011	+1.86%
2024	129,506	+0.09%

Source: Philippine Statistics Authority

- Literacy rate: 92%
- Annual growth rate: 2.6%
- Per-capita income: PhP26,182.00
- Primary livelihood: farming, fishing

== Economy ==
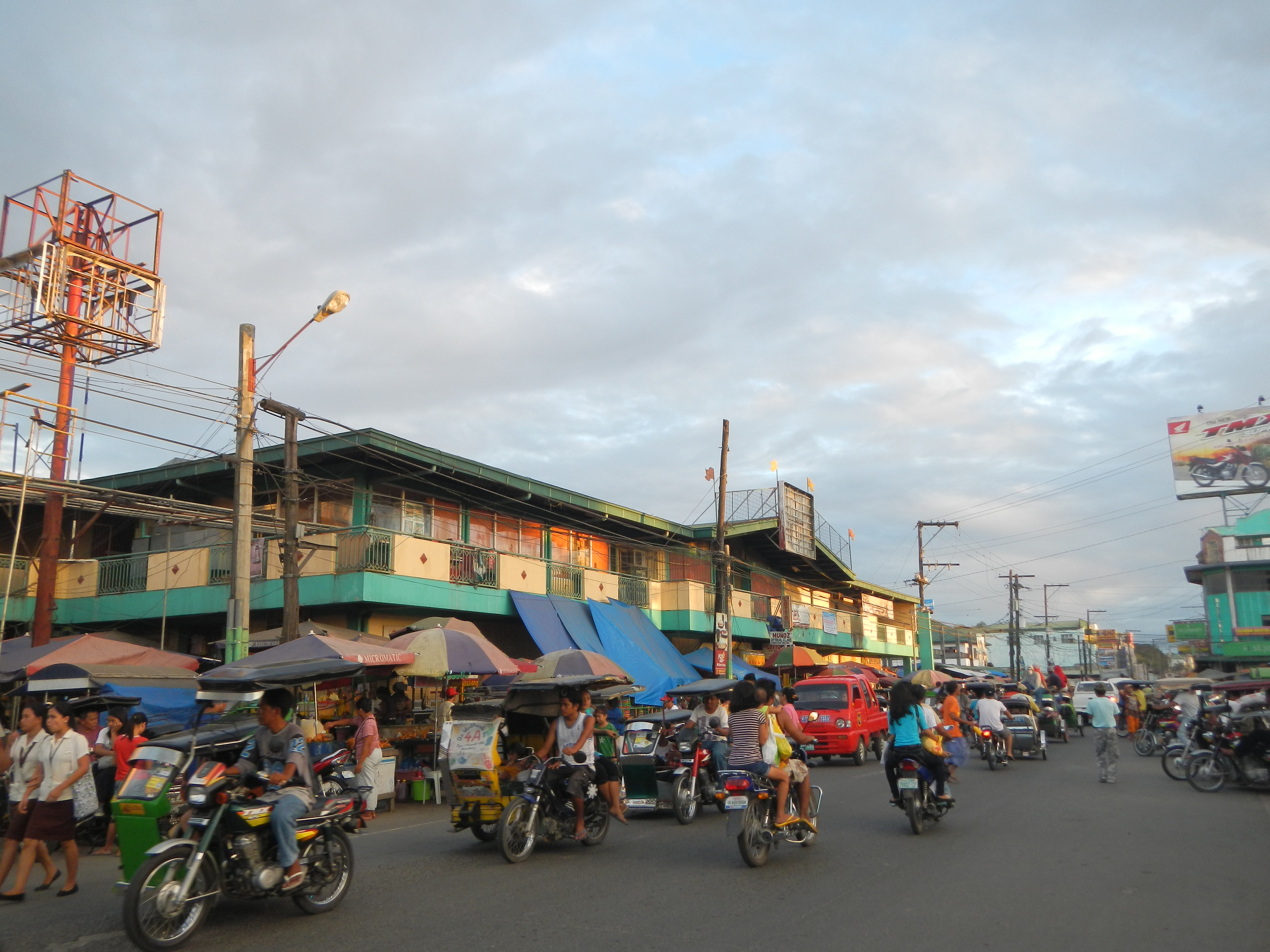
Public market

Poverty incidence of Bayambang (%)

Source: Philippine Statistics Authority

== Government ==
=== Local government ===
In accordance with the Local Government Code, Bayambang belongs to the third congressional district in the province of Pangasinan. It is governed by a mayor designated as its local chief executive and by a municipal council as its legislative body. The mayor, vice mayor and councilors are elected directly by the people via an election held every three years.

=== Elected officials ===
2025-2028 Bayambang, Pangasinan Officials
Position	Name	Party
Mayor	Mary Clare Judith Phyllis J. Quiambao	Nacionalista
Vice Mayor	Ian Camille C. Sabangan	Nacionalista
Councilors	Jan Nazer David B. Junio	Nacionalista
Councilors	Jose S. Ramos	Nacionalista
Councilors	Gerardo D. Flores	Nacionalista
Councilors	Zerex T. Terrado	Nacionalista
Councilors	Levinson Nessus M. Uy	Nacionalista
Councilors	Jocelyn S. Espejo	Nacionalista
Councilors	Raymund C. Camacho	Independent
Councilors	Rhyan P. De Vera	Independent
Ex Officio Municipal Council Members
ABC President	TBD	Nonpartisan
SK Federation President	TBD	Nonpartisan

== Culture ==
Binasuan is a traditional dance from Bayambang in which performers balance glasses partially filled with rice wine while executing a series of coordinated movements. The dance involves carrying and maneuvering the glasses while moving across the performance area.

Fish buro, a fermented rice preparation originally associated with Barangay Bongato, is made from steamed rice, salt, and freshwater fish such as carp, catfish, eel, gourami, or dalag. Rice crackers are also produced in Barangay Sangcagulis and are commonly consumed as a local snack.

== Tourism ==
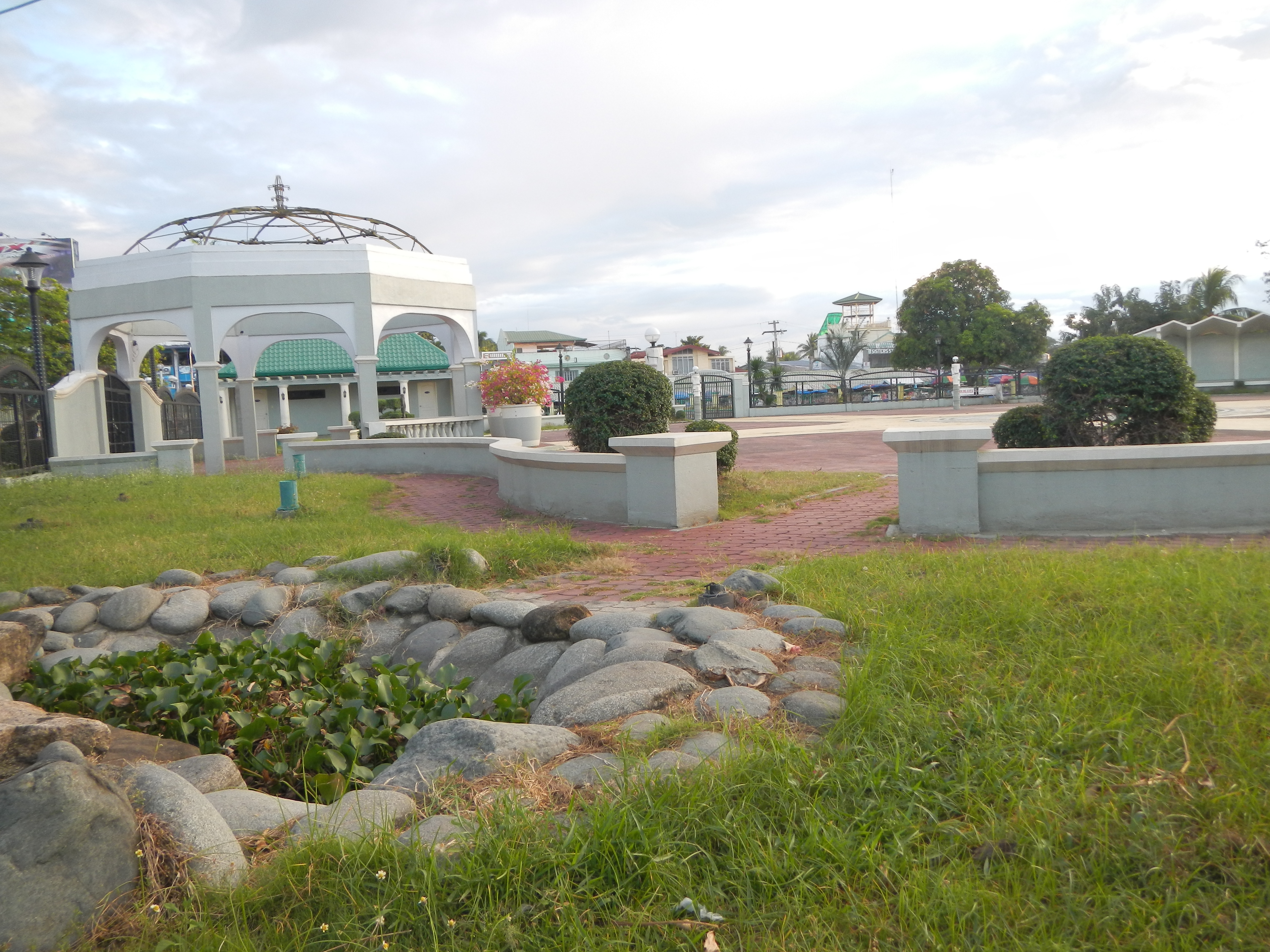
Bayambang Plaza

On November 27, 2012, the Malangsi Fish Festival was held in Bayambang and included the Kalutan ed Dalan, a street-grilling event. The municipality also holds Pista’y Baley, a local festival. Tourist attractions in Bayambang include:

- The Farmers parade displayed and corn husk products.
- Bayambang District Hospital
- Drum Corp Philippines (27th Lancers)
- Northern Plains Mansions
- CSI and Royal Malls
- Agno River Flood Control Project, Bacnono
- Rock Island Resort
- Mangabul lake
- St. Vincent Ferrer Parish Church
- St. Vincent Ferrer Statue

== Healthcare ==
The Julius K. Quiambao Medical and Wellness Center under The Medical City is a 100-bed regional hospital which is departmentalized to provide Tertiary Level II health care with 250 medical experts. The six-story JKQ Medical building rises along Bayambang-San Carlos Road in Barangay Asin. It features eye care, women's healthcare, mental wellness with CT scan, 3D ultrasound, magnetic resonance imaging and cone beam computed tomography.

== Education ==
There are two Schools District Offices which govern all educational institutions within the municipality. They oversee the management and operations of all private and public elementary and high schools. These are Bayambang I Schools District Office, and Bayambang II Schools District Office.

=== Primary and elementary schools ===
- Alinggan-Banaban Elementary School
- Amanperez Elementary School
- Amancosiling Elementary School
- Ataynan Elementary School
- Asiana Learning Institute
- Bacnono Elementary School
- Balaybuaya Elementary School
- Bani Elementary School
- Bascos-Manambong Parte Elementary School
- Bayambang Central School
- Beleng Elementary School
- Bical Elementary School
- Bongato East Elementary School
- Bongato West Elementary School
- Buayaen Central School
- Buenlag Elementary School
- Carungay Elementary School
- Cason Elementary School
- Catalino Castañeda Elementary School
- Caturay Elementary School
- Darawey Elementary School
- Dosoc Elementary School
- Hermoza Elementary School
- Idong-Inanlorenza Elementary School
- Inirangan Elementary School
- Langiran Elementary School
- Liahona Learning Center
- Macayocayo Elementary School
- Maigpa Elementary School
- Malimpec Elementary School
- Malioer Elementary School
- Managos Elementary School
- Manambong Sur Elementary School
- Mother Goose Special School System
- Nalsian Elementary School
- Obillo Elementary School
- Pangdel Elementary School
- Paragos Elementary School
- San Gabriel 2nd Elementary School
- San Gabriel-Iton Elementary School
- San Vicente Elementary School
- Sapang Elementary School
- St. Vincent's Catholic School
- St. Alexander M. Sauli Catholic School
- Tamaro-Tambac Elementary School
- Tampog Elementary School
- Tanolong Elementary School
- Tatarac Apalen Elementary School
- Telbang Elementary School
- Tococ East West Elementary School
- Warding Elementary School
- Wawa Elementary School

=== Secondary schools ===
- A.P. Guevara Integrated School
- Bayambang National High School
- Beleng National High School
- Moises B. Rebamontan National High School
- Hermosa National High School
- Sanlibo National High School
- Tanolong National High School
- Tococ National High School

=== Higher educational institutions ===
- Marianne College of Science and Technology
- Pangasinan State University
- Bayambang Polytechnic College
