= Robert Kuan =

Filipino fast food entrepreneur (1948–2018)

- 劉孝平
- Born: Roberto Fung Kuan; August 6, 1948; Manila, Philippines
- Died: September 15, 2018 (aged 70)
- Education: Asian Institute of Management
- Occupations: Restaurateur; businessman; philanthropist
- Organization(s): Founder, president of Chowking (1985–2000); Chairman of St. Luke's Medical Center (1996–2011)
- Children: 4

Roberto Fung Kuan (Chinese: 劉孝平; August 6, 1948 – September 15, 2018) was a Filipino restaurateur, businessman and philanthropist who founded the Filipino fast food chain Chowking.

Born to a Chinese immigrant family in Manila, Kuan studied business administration at the University of the Philippines Diliman and the Asian Institute of Management. He ran Ling Nam, a Chinese restaurant in Binondo partially owned by his family, for eight years, expanding it into a small chain. After learning that the board was planning to remove him, Kuan resigned and started Chowking in 1985. Tony Tan Caktiong of Jollibee was a founding business partner.

Chowking offered both Filipino and Chinese cuisine, setting it apart from the Western-style restaurants that dominated Filipino fast food. It started a successful franchising system in 1989, growing to half the size of Jollibee, the leader of the Filipino fast food market. Kuan served as Chowking's president until 2000, when he sold his 50% equity stake to the Jollibee Foods Corporation. By then, Chowking had 155 locations.

A member of the Episcopal Church, Kuan spent his later life working for various public institutions. He invested much of his time in St. Luke's Medical Center, where he served as chairman from 1996 to 2011. As of 2026, Chowking is the nation's largest Chinese restaurant chain.

== Early life and career ==
Roberto Fung Kuan was born on August 6, 1948, in Manila, the eldest of four children in a Chinese immigrant family. (Note: He had one brother and two sisters. His brother, Joseph Fung Kuan, founded Joe Kuan Food Corporation.) Kuan's father enforced strict discipline and provided for his children's education, not wanting them to experience the hardships that he had. After attending Hope Christian School, Kuan enrolled in industrial engineering at the University of the Philippines Diliman. However, he decided to study at the university's College of Business Administration instead, where he found people to be "more friendly and humane". In 1970, Kuan graduated with a bachelor's degree in general management.

After Kuan graduated, he worked for two years at Makati Supermarket. He started as a warehouse checker, but was later assigned to positions such as sales, merchandising and auditing, learning various management and business relations principles. In 1973, Kuan resigned and enrolled at the Asian Institute of Management (AIM), pursuing a master's in business management.

His father gave him ₱20,000 for his education and warned him that the only thing the money could earn in the bank was interest. During Kuan's first semester, his father battled lung cancer. Kuan told his father he wanted to propose to his girlfriend, Yvonne Yap. After the formalities, Kuan's father held out his hand to shake Yap's, right before he died. Despite this loss, Kuan followed his father's wishes and remained devoted to his studies. He later married Yap, with whom he would have four children.

In 1974, Kuan wrote his thesis on the potential expansion of Ling Nam, a Chinese restaurant partially owned by his family, under the guidance of Dean Gavino Mendoza. After graduating from AIM in 1975, Kuan worked as an assistant manager for an early prototype of the supermarket chain Ever Gotesco owned by his previous employer at Makati, but then decided to start working at Ling Nam.

== Restaurateur ==
=== Ling Nam (1975 – 1984) ===
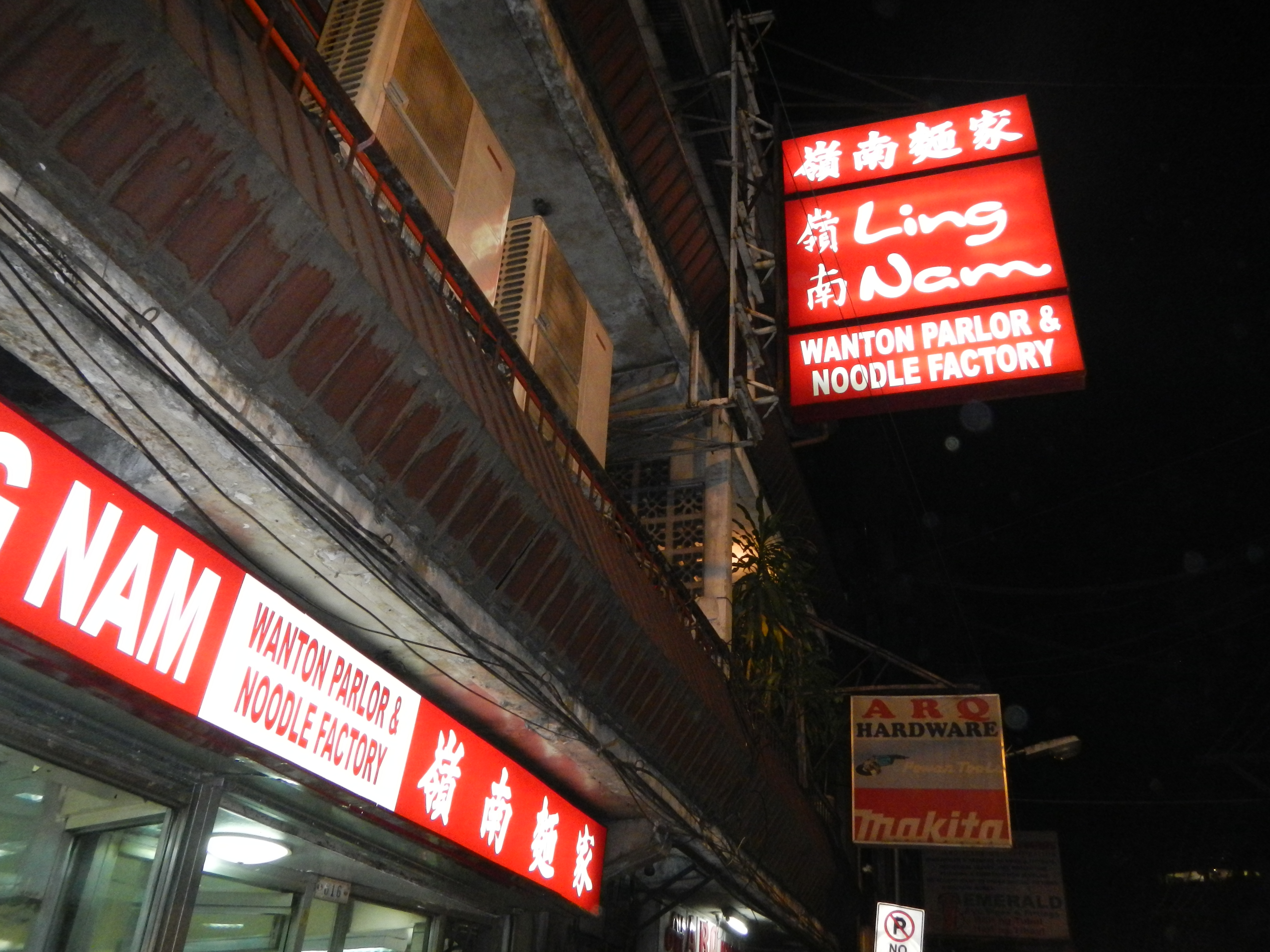
Ling Nam, T. Alonzo St., Binondo in 2014

Ling Nam on T. Alonzo St., Binondo, is a Chinese noodle house established in 1950. Kuan's father was one of the partners who established Ling Nam and his side of the family owned 15% equity. One of Kuan's uncles also ran the restaurant. The restaurant served short order food and was locally known for its beef wonton noodles and siopao.

Kuan started working at Ling Nam in December 1975 for a monthly wage of ₱500. The following year, he formed Ling Nam Enterprises, Inc. and worked 12 hours a day as chairman and president. Despite a lukewarm response from the shareholders, he was able to start five Ling Nam branches. (Note: The Manila Times's Tony Lopez, however, instead stated that the shareholders prevented Kuan from expanding Ling Nam.) However, Kuan believed that the dividends he had to pay the shareholders, including family members, stifled Ling Nam's growth, especially since there were no regular work hours. The restaurant was troubled by family disagreements and jealousies.

In his obituary for Kuan, Fr. Emeterio Barcelon, SJ, a friend of his, recounted an anecdote that Kuan had told him. Kuan went to ShoeMart shops so regularly that its owner, Henry Sy, asked him if he was spying on them. Sy let Kuan walk with him as he inspected his stores, and they became lifelong friends. In 1983, Kuan learned that the board was planning a meeting to relieve him of his position, as the principal owner's son wanted to take over. Sy told him to resign before Ling Nam's issues wore out his drive. Since Kuan led Ling Nam to its peak, Sy believed Kuan could reproduce his success with his own Chinese restaurant chain. Sy also said "Start small. [...] And very soon, you will grow big." Kuan resigned on October 16, 1984, after running the noodle house for over eight years.

=== Chowking (1984 – 2000) ===
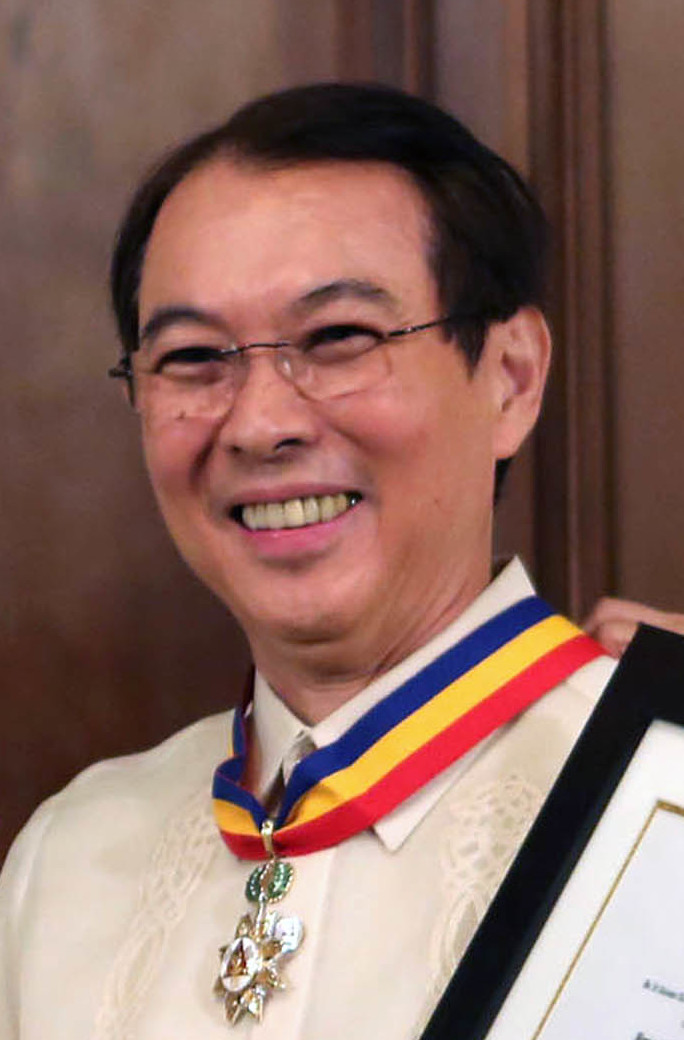
Jollibee founder Tony Tan Caktiong (pictured in 2016) was Kuan's business partner in Chowking

The Filipino fast food industry was dominated by Western-style fare. Leading chains such as Jollibee, McDonald's, Pizza Hut, and Shakey's Pizza sold french fries, hamburgers, and pizza. Additionally, the Filipino economy entered its worst ever recession in 1984 and traditional panciteria (noodle houses) were in decline. Despite these challenges, Kuan committed to starting what The Freeman's Nestor Alonso II described as a chain "offering traditional Chinese food in a novel [fast food] setting" and "bridg[ing] the old and the new".

A month after leaving Ling Nam, Kuan and Jollibee founder Tony Tan Caktiong, who was a friend of his, agreed to be business partners for Kuan's new restaurant. Kuan hired an interior designer for the "modern" Chinese restaurant. To separate it from Ling Nam, he tasked an advertising agency to come up with a unique name. Instead of Ling Nam's menu of soup and noodles, he relied on his father's recipes and created ulam (side dishes) served with fried rice such as spare ribs with douchi and steamed chicken with chorizo. Chefs in Hong Kong created the recipes which Filipino chefs trained to cook. The recipes were then standardized and automated. From the beginning, Kuan envisioned that it would become an international chain.

Chowking Food Corporation was incorporated on February 19, 1985. The principal investors were Kuan, Caktiong and Wilson Chu, but Kuan and Caktiong bought Chu's shares after two years, so that they each owned 50% of the company. The first Chowking opened on March 18, 1985, on the ground floor of Rotary Arcade, Makati Commercial Center (now SM Makati). In 1989, Chowking started a franchising system which enabled them to enter new markets with limited resources. Its first franchise opened in the provincial city of Meycauayan, Bulacan, and Chowking was able to open its tenth location the same year.

Chowking's 1992 expansion program led to the opening of the first two stores outside Luzon, in Cagayan de Oro, Mindanao, and the Visayas. In December 1992, a USAID report on developing American fast food in the Philippines praised Chowking, which at the time had 21 locations, as a model for success. The authors noted that the chain was likely to grow because Filipinos enjoyed Chinese cuisine and had a "newly-found concern for the clean, well-lit and quick service" that Chowking exemplified. Chowking opened its hundredth location in 1996 and expanded to the U.S. the following year.

In late 1999, Kuan agreed to sell his 50% controlling share of Chowking Food Corporation to Caktiong, chairman of Jollibee Foods Corporation, for ₱600,000,000. In November, Chowking had 162 branches, including four in the United States and three in Dubai. (Note: Contemporary news reports note that Chowking had 162 branches, including four in the U.S. and three in Dubai. Later sources claim that Chowking had 155, with three in the U.S. and three in the Middle East.) Kuan said that he sold Chowking to Jollibee because "the price was good and it was time to let go". Jollibee's acquisition of Chowking Food Corporation was completed in March 2000.

In the 1990s, Chowking held the naming rights to Chowking Fastfood Kings, a Philippine Basketball League (PBL) team. The team gave Leo Austria his big break as a coach in 1998, and Austria later said that he felt a great debt of gratitude ("utang na loob") to Kuan for taking a chance on him. After Jollibee acquired Chowking, it sold the team to Shark Energy Drink ahead of the 2000–01 PBL season.

=== Creative Dining (2000 – 2003) ===
After selling Chowking, Kuan started Creative Dining Inc., with his son, Robert Kelvin Kuan. In November 2000, the company opened a coffeehouse and restaurant called Hot! Café at Luneta. They established another Hot! Café in the Power Plant Mall, Rockwell Center, in January 2001. Creative Dining also opened Kingfisher, a high-end Chinese seafood restaurant, in the Power Plant Mall. It opened in June 2001 and closed down around two years later. Before opening Kingfisher, Creative Dining acquired Good View, a seafood restaurant in Malate which was a favorite of Robert Kuan and his mother. The Kuans used Good View to test whether new dishes would be well-received before introducing them to Kingfisher's menu.

Robert Kuan, the chairman and chief executive officer, viewed Creative Dining as a sort of experiment following Ling Nam and Chowking. He was mainly preoccupied with his work at St. Luke's Medical Center and the Rotary Club of Makati. Through the company, he mentored his son, the chief operating officer, on the "ins and outs" of the restaurant industry. Kelvin Kuan was given the freedom to make his own decisions and deal with the day-to-day operations, but he consulted his father for major decisions and issues.

== Other positions ==
=== St. Luke's (1989 – 2018) ===
When William Padua decided to leave the board of St. Luke's Medical Center in Quezon City, he recommended Kuan as his replacement to Chairman William H. Quasha. Padua had taken notice of Kuan's growing success with Chowking, which had ten locations when Kuan joined the board in 1989. In addition, Padua and Kuan were both members of the Episcopal Church, which owned the hospital. St. Luke's is a nonprofit and non-stock corporation, and Kuan and the other members operated pro bono.

St. Luke's relied on government subsidies and church funds, but Quasha wanted to turn it into a "world-class medical center" which could support itself and establish its own centers of excellence. When Quasha died in 1996, the board wanted Kuan to succeed him as chairman. Kuan was initially reluctant to accept the role but came to see it as a religious calling.

The board members, who practiced servant leadership, wanted to work towards Quasha's life mission. In 1996, this would have seemed very difficult to achieve. According to Kuan, they needed over ₱1 billion to bring St. Luke's to "world-class standards" by investing in modern equipment and new facilities. In comparison, only ₱5–7 million was needed to start a new Chowking franchise. In addition, when Kuan became chairman, he had to save St. Luke's from bankruptcy. To raise money, all surplus funds went back into the hospital.

St. Luke's reached several milestones during Kuan's tenure. In 2003, it became the second institution in Asia to receive Joint Commission International accreditation. St. Luke's Medical Center – Global City, a sister location in Bonifacio Global City, opened in January 2010. Kuan also served as chairman of the board of the affiliated St. Luke's College of Medicine and managed a charity program which made over ₱300 million in annual earnings. In September 2011, Kuan was succeeded by Fredrick Y. Dy, the majority shareholder of Security Bank, who had been vice chairman of St. Luke's since 1996. Kuan, who remained a board member, believed that he had succeeded in all of his goals for St. Luke's.

=== Other ===
After selling Chowking, Kuan pursued philanthropy. He served as chairman of Brent Schools, Inc. and Brent International School Baguio. He joined the board of trustees of Far Eastern College — Silang and Brent International School Manila in 1989 and served as the board and corporate secretary for the latter. He was also on the board of trustees for Brent International School Subic. Aside from education, Kuan was a board member of Chinabank and Seaoil.

Kuan was involved in Rotary International. He was elected as president of the Rotary Club of Makati 2002–2003 and District Governor of Rotary International District 3830 2013–2014. In 2012, the Bureau of Internal Revenue filed a criminal complaint against the Makati Rotary Club Foundation, Inc. (MRCFI), and Robert F. Kuan, among others, for tax evasion. They alleged that the MRCFI had misrepresented a substantial portion of rental payments as donations, compelling their lessees to disguise them as such and even demanding interest from them.

== Awards ==
Kuan received numerous awards throughout his career. The University of the Philippines gave him three awards from 1996 to 2007, and in 1981 he received the Triple A Award (Alumni Achievement Award), the highest honor for AIM alumni, for his work with Ling Nam. In 1996, Kuan received the Agora Award for Outstanding Achievement in the Field of Entrepreneurship from the Philippine Marketing Association and the Business Achiever of the Decade from The Philippine Star. He received the Franchise Excellence Award as the Most Promising Filipino Franchisor from the Philippine Franchise Association in 1999, The Outstanding Filipino (TOFIL) Award from JCI Senate Philippines and Insular Life in 2003, and the Business Leadership Award (Pillar Category) from the Aurelio Periquet Jr. Foundation in 2004.

== Personal life ==
Kuan was an Episcopalian and his faith influenced his role at St. Luke's. Kuan died on September 15, 2018. He was cremated per his wishes.
