= Ling Nam =

Filipino chain of Chinese restaurants

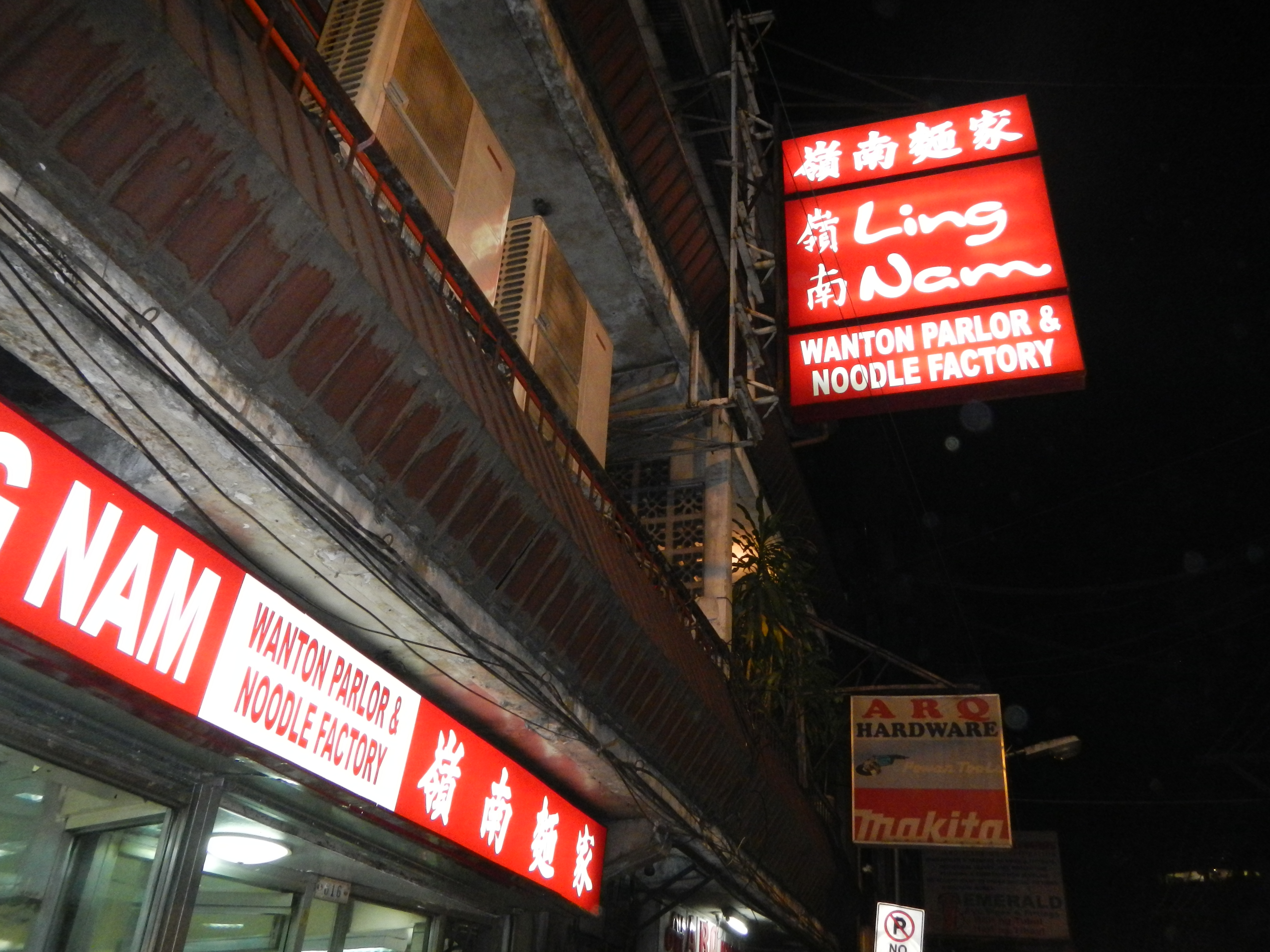
- First location in Santa Cruz, Manila in 2014
- Native name: 嶺南
- Company type: Subsidiary
- Industry: Fast food restaurants
- Founded: 1950; 76 years ago Santa Cruz, Manila
- Founder: Tomas C. Fung
- Number of locations: 34 (2024)
- Products: Noodles; dim sum; congee; siopao
- Parent: Fruitas Holdings

Ling Nam (Cantonese: 嶺南) is a chain of Chinese restaurants in the Philippines owned by Fruitas Holdings. The first location in Santa Cruz, Manila, was established in 1950, but Robert Fung Kuan turned it into a small franchise when he was CEO from 1976 to 1984. While it was a popular destination in Manila's Chinatown, Ling Nam declined in the following decades and the Fung family put it up for sale. Fruitas Holdings bought the chain in 2022 and expanded it into 34 locations.

Manila's Ling Nam is regarded as a pioneer panciteria. Serving short order fare, its top-sellers are lamian or hand-pulled noodles, congee, dim sum (siomai) and siopao. It is particularly known for its beef wonton noodles.

== History ==
=== Tomás Fung ===
Tomás Fung's ancestors came from Zhongshan County, Guangdong, near Guangzhou. His grandfather came to the Philippines in the late 19th century, and established a small restaurant on Nueva Street, in a part of Manila which was already largely ethnically Chinese. Fung's father helped with public relations for many Chinese restaurants.

As the fifth child in an overseas Chinese middle-class family, Fung was given no clear career path. The family's situation was exacerbated by the Japanese occupation of the Philippines in World War II, and almost all their belongings were destroyed in the Battle of Manila. Fung decided he needed to go into business. With the ₱3,000 (equivalent to ₱194,031 in 2021) he had saved up, Fung started Wa Yan Restaurant in Quiapo, Manila in July 1945 with his other friends from Zhongshan. However, they all had to work double shifts, had trouble finding and keeping good staff, and could only break even, so Fung sold the restaurant for ₱10,000 (equivalent to ₱1,274,995 in 2021) in 1950.

That year, Fung established Ling Nam (Cantonese: 嶺南 ling^{5} naam^{4}, lit. 'south of the mountains') on Zacateros Street in Santa Cruz, Manila, near Binondo. Although he ran the restaurant, Fung had seven or eight partners. He simplified the menu, focusing on widely appealing Chinese dishes. Their beef wonton noodles and siopao were joined by a variety of dishes over the years. Fung moved Ling Nam to its current location at 616 T. Alonzo Street in Santa Cruz, Manila, in 1965, within Manila Chinatown. According to The Philippine Star, "a trip to Chinatown [Binondo] then always meant a stop at Ling Nam." Ling Nam was a pioneer of the noodle houses (panciteria) which were popular destinations in Binondo area during those years. The restaurant had famous regular guests such as Mayor Alfredo Lim.

=== Restaurant chain ===
Before he founded Chowking, Robert Fung Kuan founded Ling Nam Enterprises, Inc., in 1976. Fung was Kuan's uncle, and his father was one of the shareholders. Kuan became the chairman and CEO of Ling Nam. With twelve-hour work days, he gradually expanded Ling Nam and was able to open five branches. However, the shareholders were protective of the restaurant—having initially opposed Ling Nam's expansion—and Ling Nam was plagued by family squabbles. Kuan himself thought that the restaurant's growth was stifled because he had to distribute dividends to the shareholders, his family members, who did not have any regular work hours. (Note: The Manila Times' Tony Lopez, however, instead stated that the shareholders prevented Kuan from expanding Ling Nam.) In 1984, Kuan learned that the board was planning to relieve him of his position. He opted to resign rather than be fired and founded Chowking the following year. Kuan told his acquaintances that the board's decision was because Fung's son wanted to lead the company. Peter K. Fung, Fung's son, became president of Ling Nam in 1984.

In the 1980s, Ling Nam had 11 stores, located across Metro Manila and in malls such as Ayala Center and Harrison Plaza. However, the chain went into decline in the following two decades, along with other traditional panciteria, facing management and labor issues. In 2004, the Fung family bought back their controlling interest in Ling Nam. Fung's son, Peter, returned to the Philippines from Canada to manage it.

In 2006, Peter Fung incorporated a new company, Tri-Mark Foods Inc., and tried to expand Ling Nam slowly, opening three stores. Fung also added new dishes such as the Dragon Shrimp Balls, named for its resemblance for Dragon Ball character Goku's hair. The Fung family put Ling Nam up for sale in 2020. Fruitas Holdings acquired the chain, which only had four locations, on July 1, 2022. It was a childhood favorite of CEO Lester Yu, who was raised in Binondo. As with other brands it acquires, Ling Nam–branded products such as Ling Nam Noodles are sold at Fruitas' other franchises. Under the company, Ling Nam expanded to seven locations by February 2024. Fruitas also introduced simplified versions of Ling Nam, including three Ling Nam Express, one Ling Nam Noodle Bar and 23 Fried Ling Nam Siopao outlets.

== Menu ==
Menu

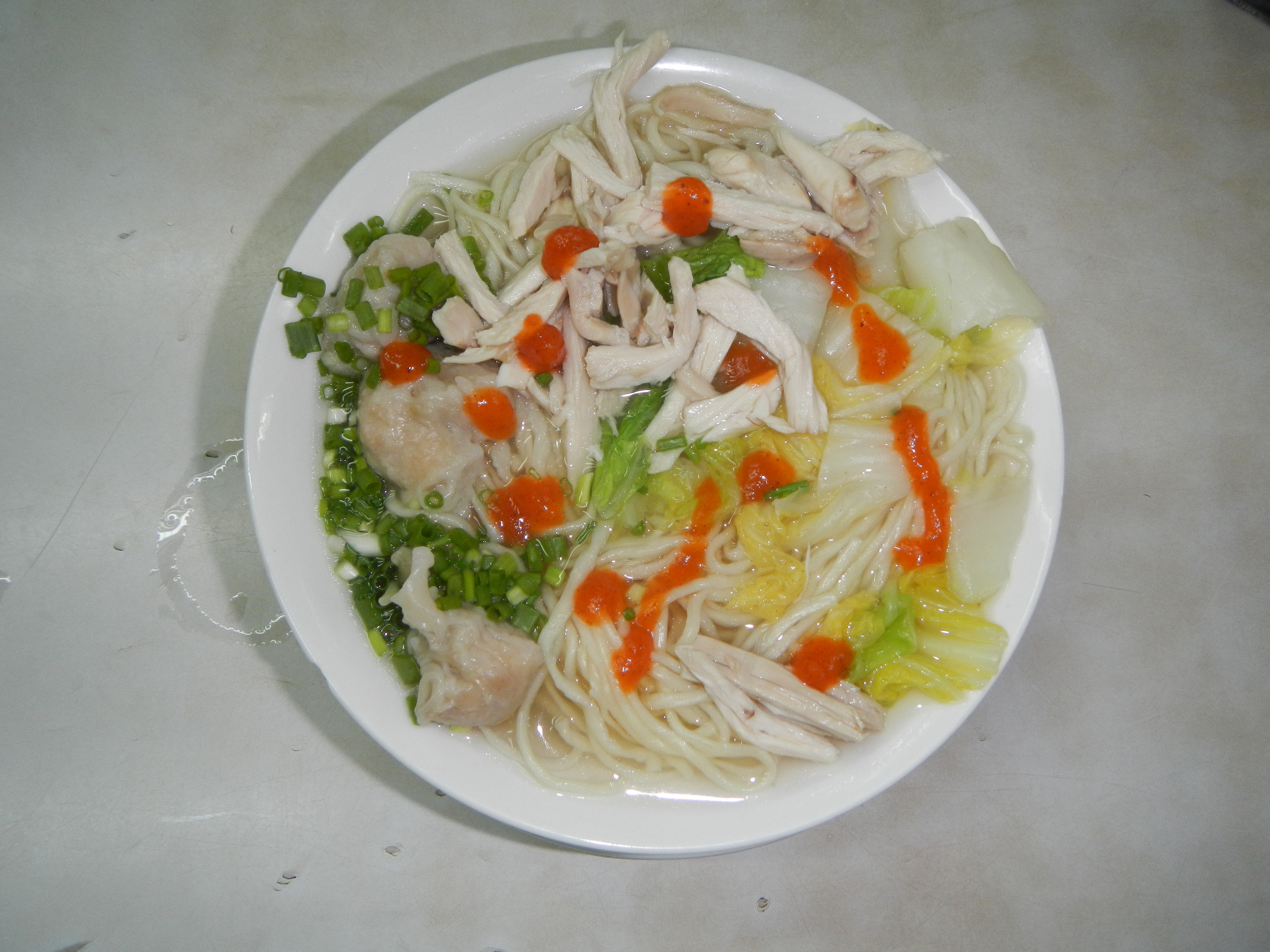
Chicken Mien, 2014

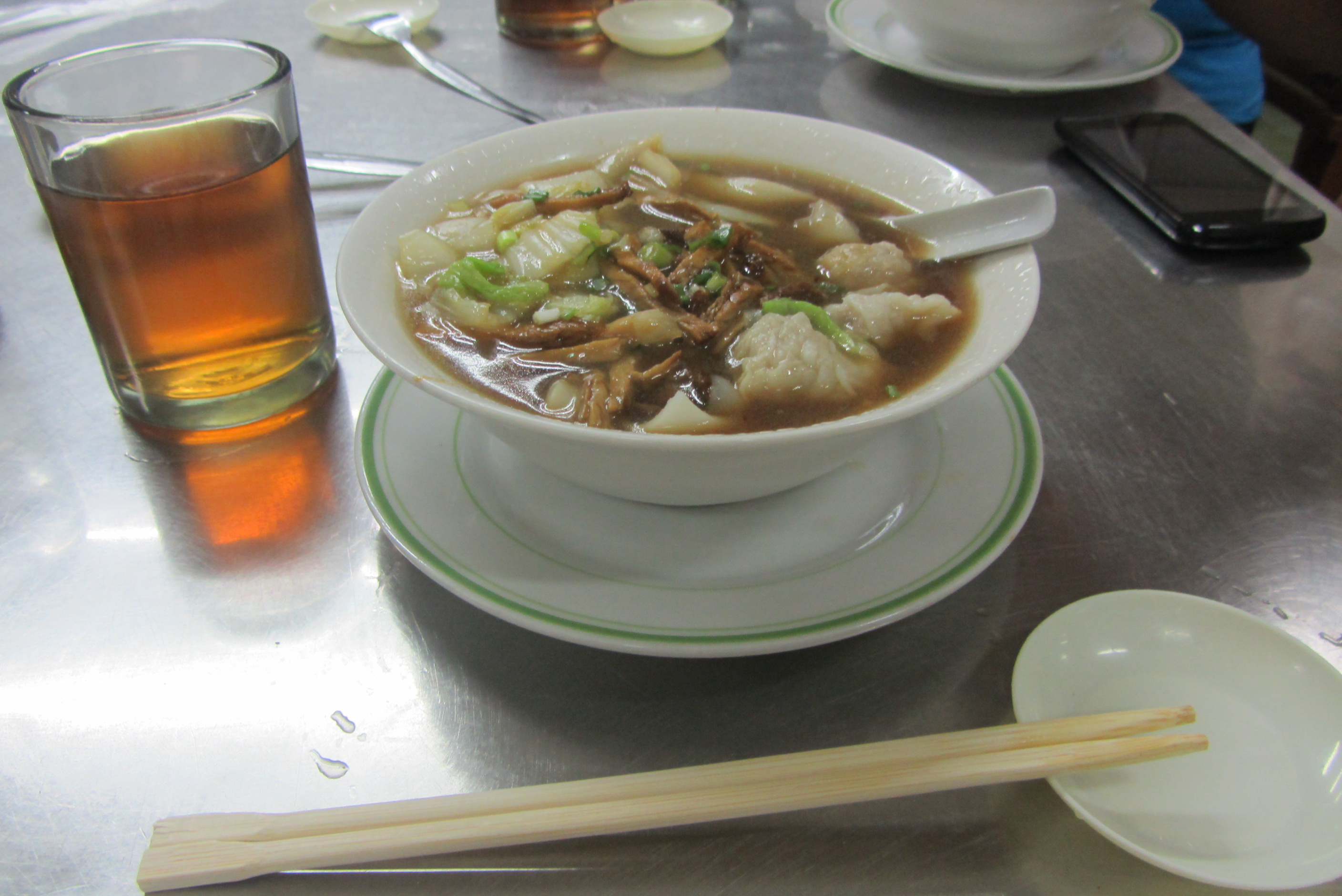
Beef Wanton Ho Fan, 2016

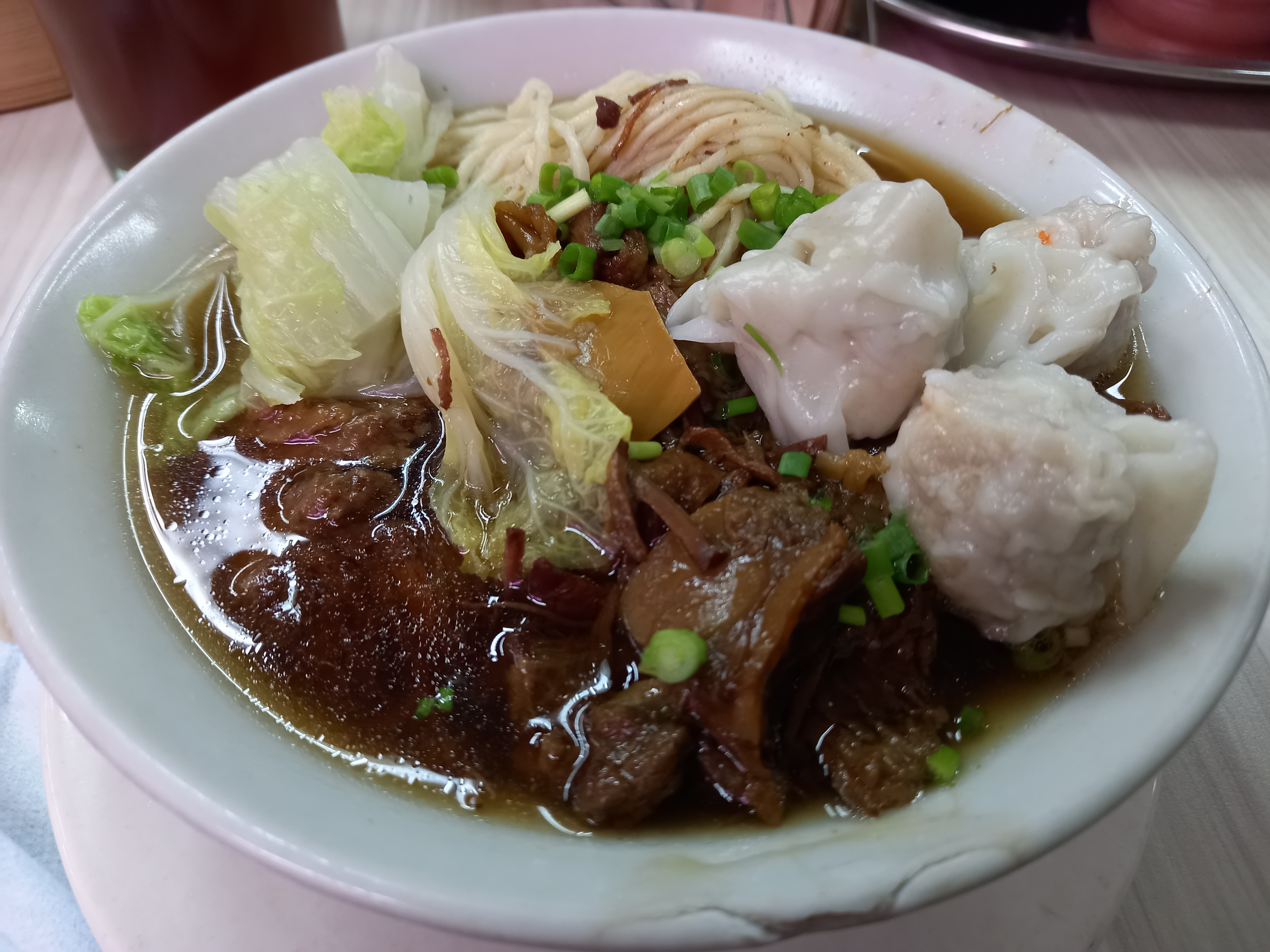
Beef Wanton Mien, 2022

Ling Nam is a Cantonese restaurant. Because it has a short menu, ensuring that customers always know what they want to order, and quickly prepared fare, Ling Nam has been described as a fast food restaurant.

Its top-sellers are its noodles, congee, dim sum (siomai) and siopao. Their siopao (Tai Pao) is rather large, at 4 inches (10 cm). Reviewers have praised the original branch's cuisine. Esquire Philippines thought it was "underrated" despite having the "most consistent-tasting menu" since it opened; Ling Nam's four main products have always been cooked in the same way, with the noodles handmade daily. Other dishes include pancit canton and viands such as sweet and sour pork, chop suey, and Ling Nam beef. While the original location's menu has long gone unchanged, other branches have extra offerings to cater to local clientele.

The beef wonton noodles are Ling Nam's house special, and are "much-recommended". In the Philippine Daily Inquirer, Ambeth R. Ocampo wrote that "the meat was fresh and tender, the broth was excellent, the noodles on the soft side, prompting me to remind myself not to compare it unfairly with Ippudo. However, the little old lady at the cashier said I could specify noodle consistency upon ordering."

== Bibliography ==
- Roman, Emerlinda R.; Echanis, Erlinda S.; Pineda, Ernesto P.; Rodriguez, Rafael A.; Sicat, Maria Teresa M. (1996). "Chowking Food Corporation". Management Control in Chinese-Filipino Business Enterprises. University of the Philippines Press. pp. 47–60. ISBN 9789717420097.
- Ravenholt, Albert (1968). "The Ling Nam Wanton Parlor". Fieldstaff Reports: Southeast Asia series. Vol. XV. pp. 37–51. ISSN 0066-1015.
