= Unioil =

Philippine-based chain of gas stations and petroleum company

Unioil Petroleum Philippines Inc
- Industry: Oil
- Founded: 1966; 60 years ago in Valenzuela, Bulacan
- Founder: Co family
- Headquarters: Ortigas Center, Pasig, Metro Manila, Philippines
- Area served: Luzon, Cebu and Davao City
- Key people: Janice Co Roxas-Chua (CEO); Kenneth C. Pundanera (President)
- Products: Oil, lubricant
- Services: Electric vehicle charging
- Website: unioil.com

Unioil Petroleum Philippines, Inc., simply known as Unioil, is a Philippine downstream oil company.

== History ==
Unioil Petroleum Philippines, Inc. was established in 1966 by the Chinese-Filipino Co family as a lubricant manufacturer and distributor with a facility in Valenzuela. Unioil expanded to fuel trading, distribution, and retailing when the Philippine petroleum industry was deregulated in 1998.

In 2003, Unioil established an oil depot in Mindanao. The company has 30 service stations at around this period.

Unioil still has 30 service stations in Metro Manila, Cavite, Pampanga and Laguna in 2012. In February of that year, introduced Euro IV standard diesel ahead of the Department of Environment and Natural Resources requirement for all oil companies to sell diesel of that standard and above by 2016.

In September 2017, Unioil began selling Euro V standard diesel. On November 27, 2017, Unioil claimed to be the first oil company in the Philippines to open an electric charging facility when it launched a service station in Quezon City. At around this time there are 61 service stations by Unioil, mostly in Metro Manila. In late 2022, Unioil opened its 100th station in Cavite.

In 2024, Unioil opened a terminal in San Fernando, Cebu. The company plans to use the terminal as part of its expansion to Visayas and Mindanao.

In February 2020, it acquired 78.04% of Philippine Stock Exchange-listed ChemPhil, Inc. (formerly Chemical Industries of the Philippines) as a backdoor-listing vehicle for potential investment in industries related to the government's infrastructure program, including but not limited to the construction equipment industry.

In February 2025, Saudi Arabian firm Aramco announced that they had entered into a definitive agreements to acquire 25% of Unioil. Then on November 7, 2025, Aramco it was officially announced that they acquired 25 percent stake in Unioil. This marks Aramco's return to the Philippine market after previously owning 40 percent of Petron from 1994 to 2008. Due to the partnership, Unioil will introduce new products under the Aramco like "Aramco Proforce", its premium fuel line engineered to elevate engine performance and Valvoline lubricant brand.

Unioil also announced the start of the operations of its strategic partnership with Spanish-based company Repsol last February 2025. As part of the agreement, Repsol Downstream Internacional, S.A.U., a subsidiary of Repsol, has acquired a 40% stake in Unioil Lubricants Inc. (ULI), the lubricants manufacturing and distribution arm of the Unioil Group.

== Locations ==
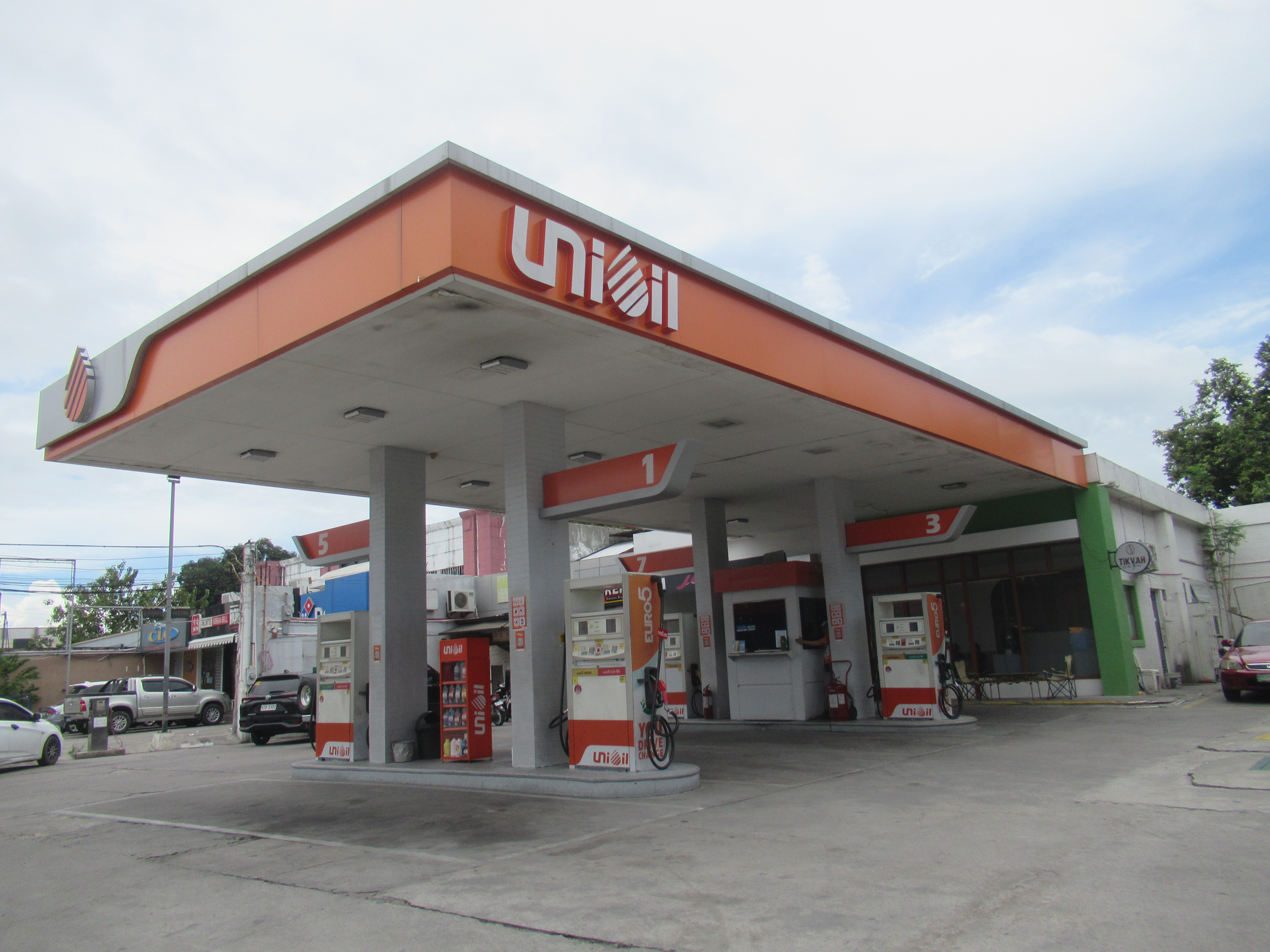
Unioil station in San Fernando, Pampanga.

As of February 2025, Unioil has 165 retail stations and four terminals in the Philippines.

== Products and services ==
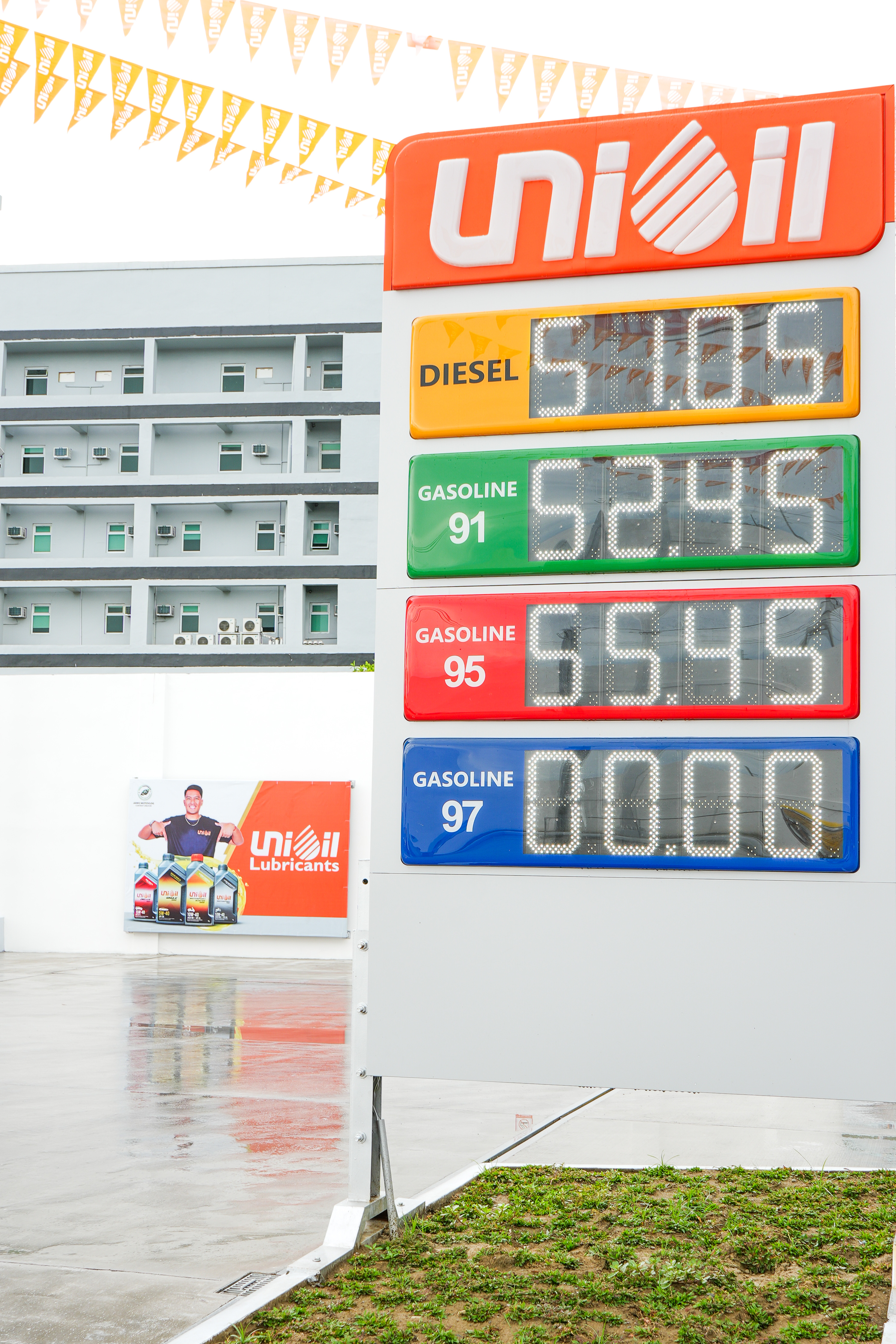
Price signage.

Unioil sells gasoline and diesel products in its service stations which are Euro V compliant since 2017. It also blends and distributes lubricants, as well as bitumen and asphalt. Some of their stations also has electric vehicle charging facilities.

== See also ==
- List of gas station chains in the Philippines
