= Taipan Place =

- Interactive map of the Taipan Place area

General information
- Status: Completed
- Type: Office
- Location: Emerald Avenue, Ortigas Center, Pasig, Metro Manila, Philippines
- Coordinates: 14.5850°N 121.0621°E

Height
- Height: 82.92 m (272.05 ft)

Technical details
- Floor count: 22

Design and construction
- Architects: W.V. Coscolluela and Associates

Taipan Place is a 22-storey office building in Ortigas Center, Pasig.

== Tenants ==
Building occupants include Figaro Coffee, Seaoil, COMNET, Daiichi Properties, BlackBerry, Northern Telecom, Whiteplane Inc. and Dyson.
