= Chowking =

Filipino fast food restaurant chain specializing in Chinese-Filipino cuisine

- Product type: Filipino Chinese fast food chain
- Current owner: Fresh N' Famous Foods (Jollibee Group) (Note: Fresh N' Famous, in turn is a subsidiary of Jollibee Group)
- Country: Philippines
- Introduced: March 18, 1985; 41 years ago
- Related brands: Jollibee; Greenwich; Red Ribbon
- Previous owners: Chowking Food Corporation
- Website: www.chowking.com www.chowkingusa.com

Chowking (Chinese: 超群; pinyin: chāoqún) is a Filipino fast food restaurant chain that serves Filipino Chinese cuisine. Founded in 1985, Chowking was acquired by Jollibee Group in 2000. It is widely considered the country's most popular restaurant of Chinese-Filipino food and was once the second-largest Filipino fast food chain. There are over 600 locations of the restaurant worldwide.

== History ==
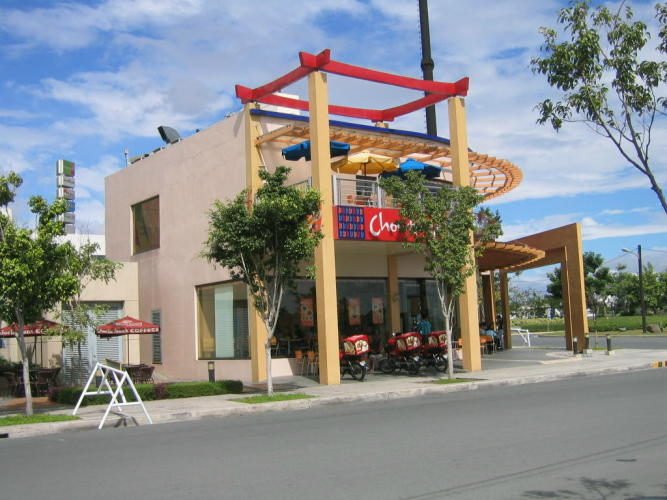
A Chowking restaurant in 2007

=== Beginnings (1985–1999) ===
Hailing from a Chinese-Filipino family, Robert Kuan graduated with an MBA degree in 1975. He became the CEO of Ling Nam, a Chinese restaurant in Binondo, Manila, partially owned by his family, and successfully expanded it into a small restaurant chain. Ling Nam, however, was plagued by family conflict. Kuan learned that the shareholders were planning to remove him from his position. Taking the advice of his friend Henry Sy, Kuan resigned in October 1984.

Kuan had plans to start his own Chinese restaurant, another piece of advice from Sy. He wanted to adopt the fast food format, providing an alternative to the leading Western-style fast food chains such as Jollibee and McDonald's.

Chowking Food Corporation was incorporated on February 19, 1985. The principal investors were Kuan, Jollibee founder Tony Tan Caktiong and Wilson Chu. After two years, Kuan and Caktiong bought Chu's shares, so they each owned 50% of the company. The name "Chowking" comes from the Chinese word meaning "outstanding".

The first Chowking opened on March 18, 1985, on the ground floor of Rotary Arcade (now the site of SM Makati) in Makati Commercial Center, Makati. In 1989, Chowking started a franchise system which enabled them to enter new markets with limited resources. Its first franchise opened in the provincial town of Meycauayan, Bulacan. That year, Chowking had expanded to ten locations. It required ₱5–7 million to start a new Chowking franchise.

Chowking's 1992 expansion program led to the opening of the first two stores outside Luzon: at Limketkai Center in Cagayan de Oro, Mindanao and at Era Mall in Bacolod, Visayas. A U.S. government report believed that Chowking was likely to succeed because Filipinos enjoyed Chinese cuisine and had a "newly-found concern for the clean, well-lit and quick service they provide." At the end of 1992, there were 21 Chowking locations. In 1996, Chowking opened its hundredth location.

In his book on Fast Food Globalization in the Provincial Philippines (2017), Ty Matejowsky found that Chowking's largest competitors are not other fast food chains but local, family-owned Chinese restaurants. Its biggest competitors in 1994 included Ling Nam. When Chowking expanded to San Fernando, Pampanga, in 1997, many restaurants had to adjust their menus; for example, they now add sugar to their siopao to resemble Chowking's.

In late 1999, Kuan agreed to sell his 50% controlling share of Chowking Food Corporation to Caktiong, chairman of Jollibee Group, for ₱600,000,000 (equivalent to ₱1,397,862,774 in 2021). In November, Chowking had 162 branches, including four in the United States and three in Dubai. (Note: Contemporary news reports note that Chowking had 162 branches, including four in the U.S. and three in Dubai. Later sources claim that Chowking had 155, with three in the U.S. and three in the Middle East.) The Wall Street Journal called it the Philippines' most successful Chinese food chain. In a televised interview, Kuan said that he sold Chowking to Jollibee because "the offer was good and it was time to let go".

In the 1990s, Chowking held the naming rights to Chowking Fastfood Kings, a Philippine Basketball League (PBL) team. The team gave Leo Austria his big break as a coach in 1998, and included notable players such as Roger Yap and Chris Calaguio. After Jollibee acquired Chowking, the team was sold to Shark Energy Drink ahead of the 2000–01 PBL season.

=== Jollibee (2000–present) ===
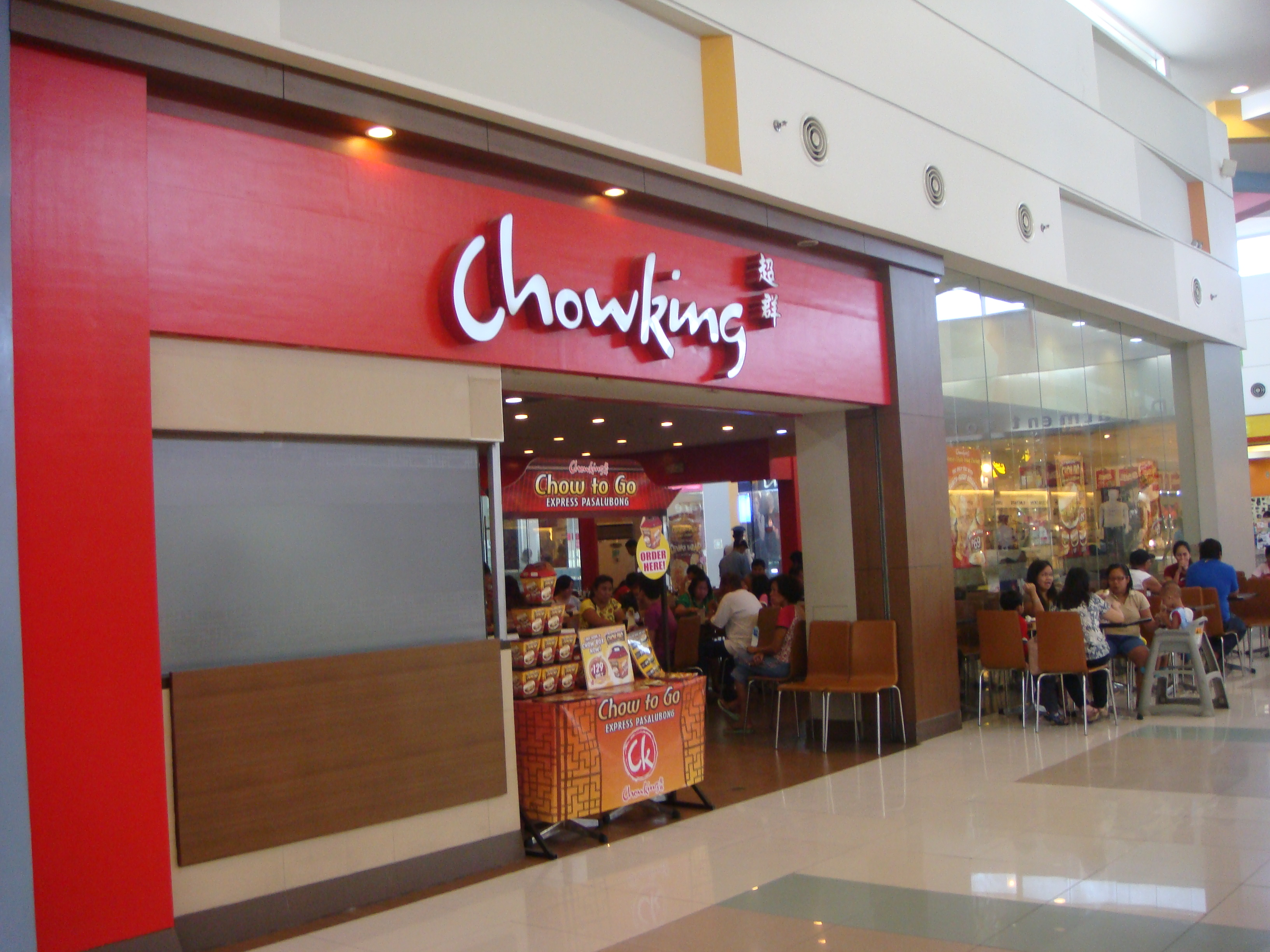
Chowking outlet at SM City Baliwag

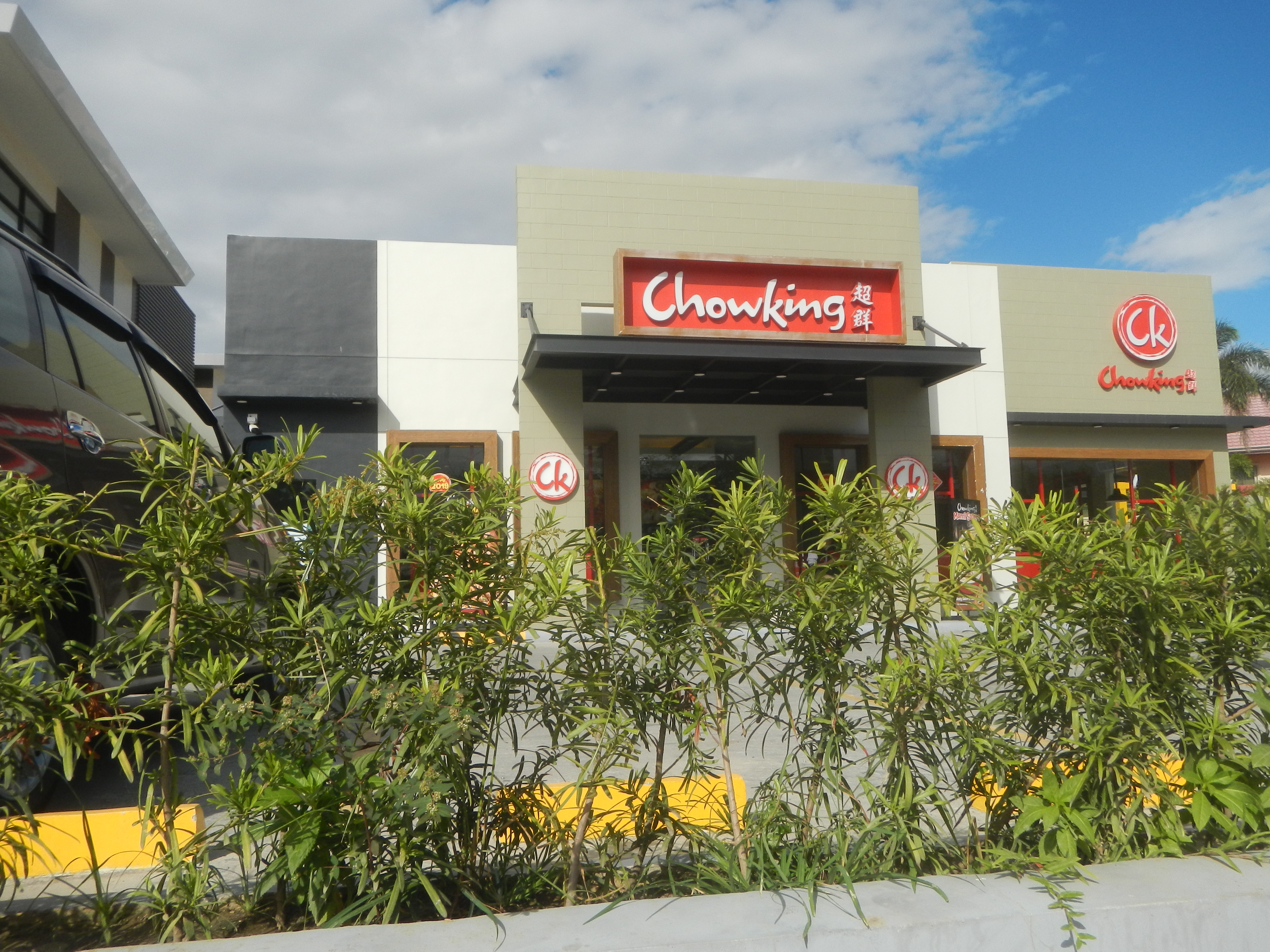
Typical exterior of a Chowking restaurant

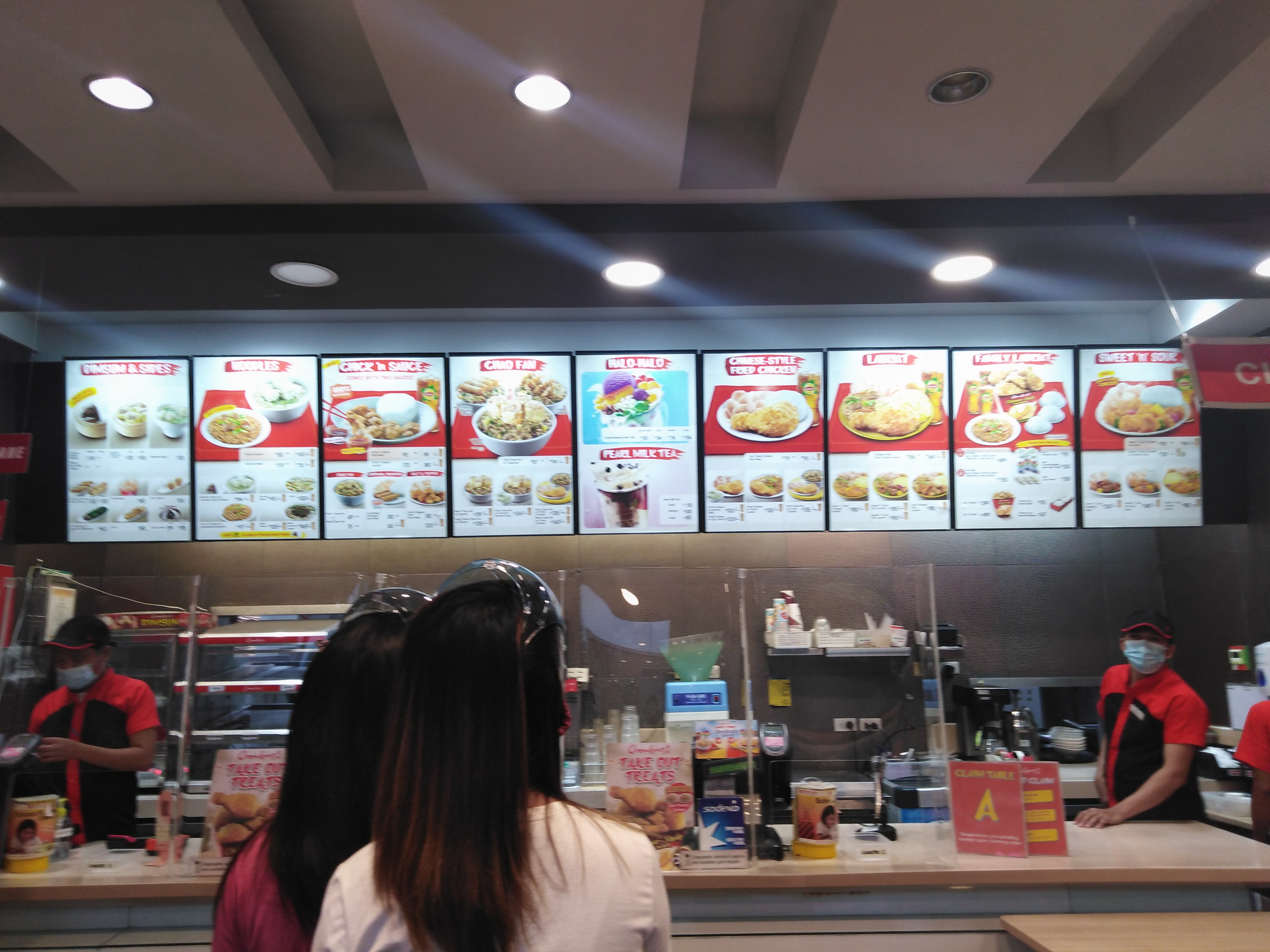
Chowking restaurant interior in Mandaue, Cebu

Jollibee's acquisition of Chowking Food Corporation from its holding company, Antares Holdings, Inc., was completed in March 2000. Rufino L. dela Rosa, Jollibee's vice president, stated that the merger would cut down Chowking's supply, marketing and administrative expenses and maximize storage space, especially if new Chowking branches were built beside Jollibee's. Analysts predicted Jollibee, which was experiencing weak third-quarter results and stock performance, would also benefit financially.

Jollibee's chief financial officer of twelve years, dela Rosa was the one who successfully negotiated the stock swap with Kuan. Caktiong offered dela Rosa the role of Chowking's new CEO and president. Having run two businesses of his own, he accepted the offer. In 2000, Chowking's revenue rose to ₱2.4 billion from 1999's ₱2.08 billion.

To simplify its corporate structure, Jollibee merged Chowking with fellow subsidiaries Greenwich Pizza and Baker Fresh Foods Philippines in 2006 and renamed it Fresh N' Famous Foods Inc. By then, Chowking had 342 stores in the Philippines.

From 2006 to 2008, Chowking invested ₱270 million in a modernization program which redeveloped their Noodle Building and increased the automation for the food production lines of their two commissaries. Located in Muntinlupa, the commissaries also act as warehouses and distribution centers.

In August 2010, Chowking was rebranded with a new logo and slogan: "Tikman ang Tagumpay" (lit. 'Taste Success').

In December 2023, the Department of Labor and Employment in Davao City were prompted to inspect a local Chowking after one of their employees posted a viral TikTok. In it, she said that she had to go door-to-door looking for customers to meet her daily sales quota. She also had to pay her own transportation fare. Social media users criticized Chowking, with some claiming that this was not an isolated case.

== Foreign expansion ==
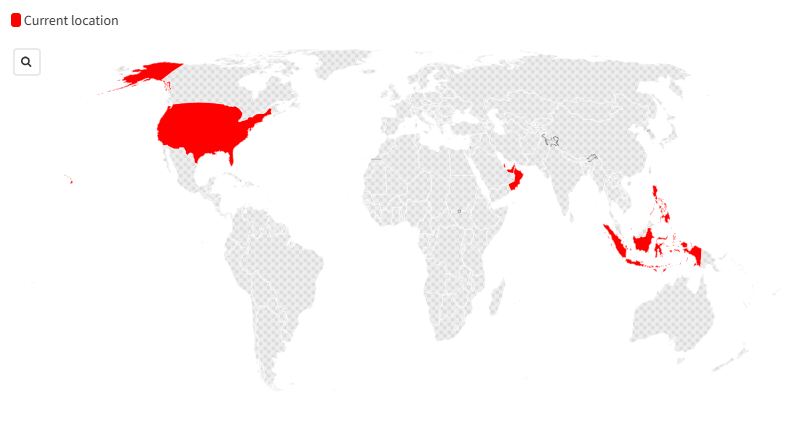
The Chowking locations as of 2024

In 1996, Chowking opened its first overseas location in San Diego, California. Both Kuan and Caktiong had unfulfilled plans in the following decade to expand to Europe and China.

Three years later, it entered the Indonesian market, opening two stores in the capital city of Jakarta.

In 2004, Chowking opened its first two stores in Dubai, United Arab Emirates. By 2008, Chowking had over 400 stores within the Philippines, Indonesia, United States and the Middle East. In Dubai, Chowking's commissary supplied ten stores.

In 2011, Jollibee acquired control over the franchised operations of Chowking USA, later on giving the full ownership to JFC. They also gave 25% ownership to JFC Ayco Inc.

Chowking has also expanded to the Middle East. In February 2014, Chowking had 19 stores in the UAE, five in Qatar, and two in Oman. Tradeline LLC's Ahmed Lafir opened the UAE's first Chowking in April 2003. The country's locations are far more spacious. Since they cater mostly to expatriate Filipinos, Chowking UAE soon added more "Filipino home-style dishes" such as bulalo and kare-kare to its menu.

== Products ==
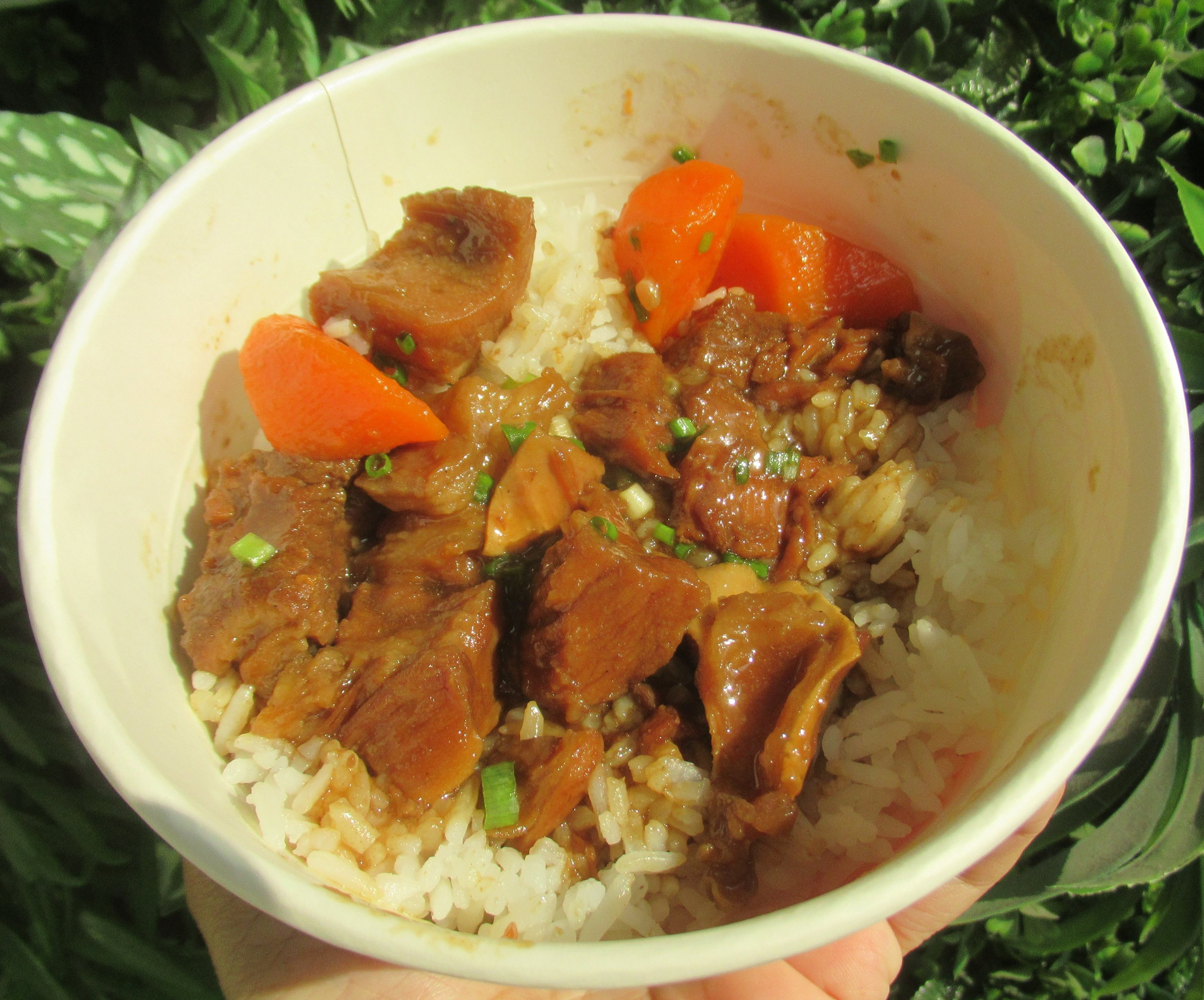
Slow-cooked braised beef

Chowking offers Filipino Chinese cuisine, a departure from typical fast food fare. Matejowsky notes that Chowking sells dishes which consumers cannot purchase at larger chains such as McDonald's or Jollibee. Its diverse menu includes chicken and beef dishes served with rice; Filipino dishes such as mami and "sweet-tasting" siopao; and desserts such as the Filipino halo-halo, which Matejowsky described as "one of Chowking's most popular offerings".

== Bibliography ==
- Matejowsky, Ty (2017). Fast Food Globalization in the Provincial Philippines. Lexington Books. ISBN 9780739139905.
