= List of gas station chains in the Philippines =

This is a list of major gas station chains in the Philippines. This includes the "Big Three", which refers to the top three companies in the oil industry: Petron, Shell, and Caltex. Historically, Seaoil was part of this grouping.

== Domestic ==
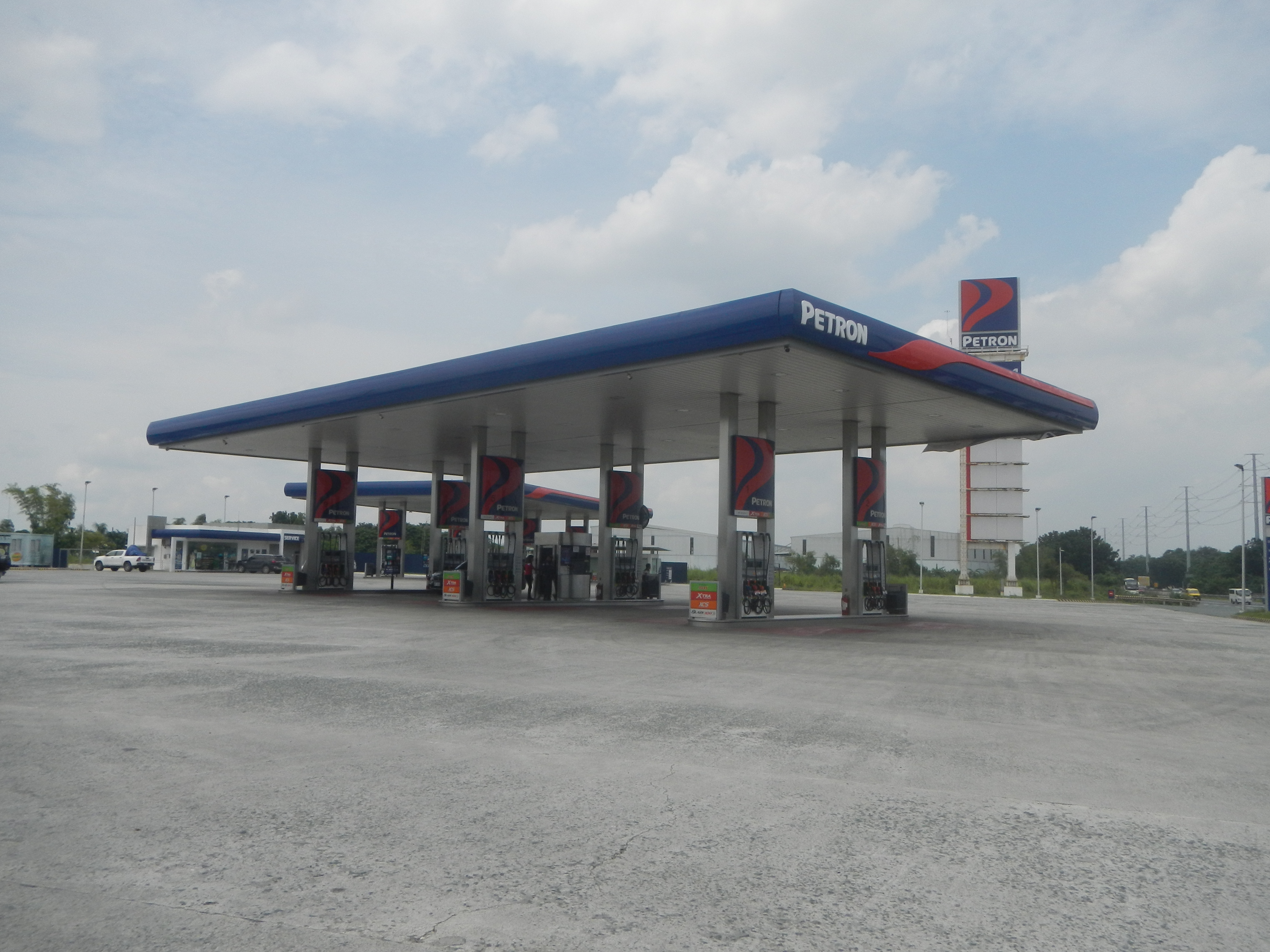
Petron gas station in Laguna

List of gas station chains ran by companies which are headquartered in the Philippines.

- Petron (Mandaluyong)
- Petro Gazz
- Phoenix (Davao City)
- Jetti (Pasay)
- Seaoil (Pasig)
- Flying V (TWA, Inc.; Quezon City)
- Unioil (Pasig)
- Clean Fuel (Pasig)

== Foreign ==
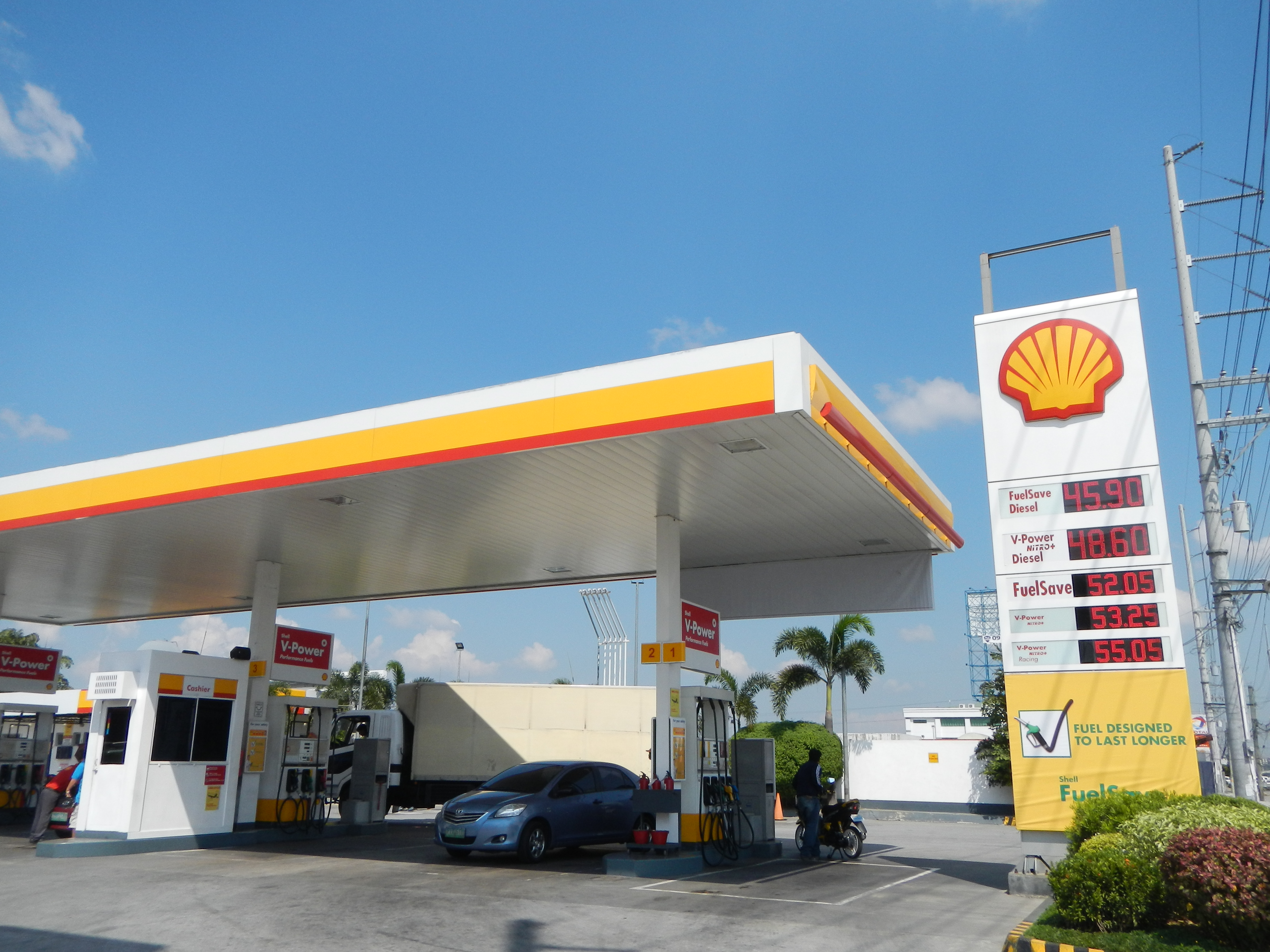
Shell gas station in Pampanga

List of gas station chains ran by companies which are headquartered outside the Philippines. This includes foreign companies with locally based subsidiaries.

- Caltex (Chevron) (United States)
- PTT (Thailand)
- Shell (British)
- Total (France)
