= Jollibee =

Filipino fast-food restaurant chain

- Logo since 2011

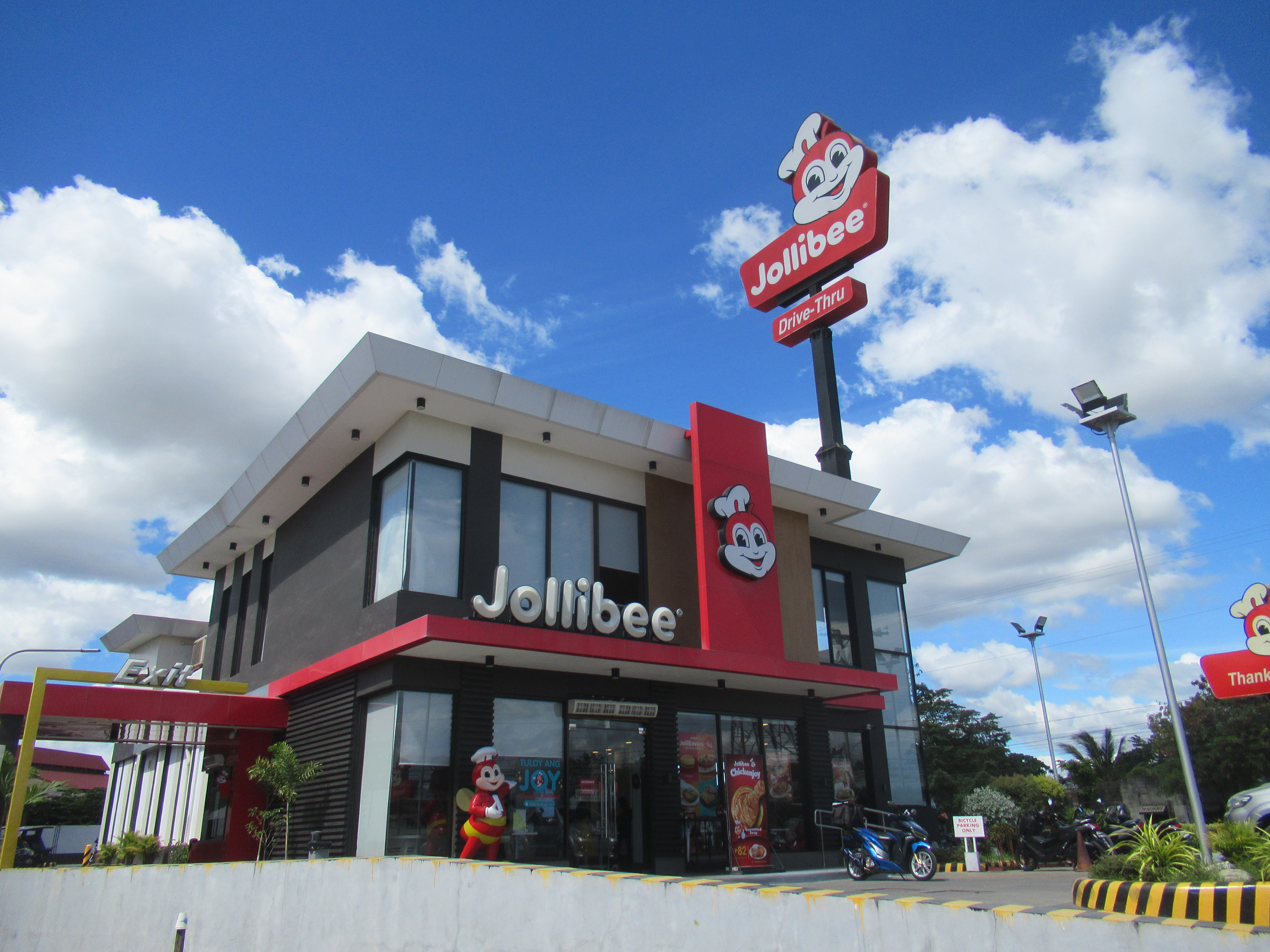
- Jollibee in Rizal, Nueva Ecija, Philippines
- Product type: Fast-food restaurant
- Current owner: Jollibee Group
- Country: Philippines
- Introduced: 1978; 48 years ago
- Markets: List: Philippines; Bahrain; Brunei; Canada; Guam; Hong Kong; Italy; Kuwait; Macau; Malaysia; Oman; Qatar; Saudi Arabia; Singapore; Spain; United Arab Emirates; United Kingdom; United States; Vietnam
- Tagline: Langhap-Sarap; Bida ang sarap/saya! No. 1 Sa Saya
- Website: jollibee.com.ph jollibeefoods.com (US & Canada)
- Founder: Tony Tan Caktiong
- Headquarters: Jollibee Plaza Building, Emerald Ave., Ortigas Center, Pasig, Philippines
- Number of locations: 1,700 (2024)
- Key people: Tony Tan Caktiong (Chairman); Ernesto Tanmantiong (President & CEO)

Jollibee is a Filipino fast-food restaurant chain and the flagship brand of Jollibee Foods Corporation (JFC). Established in 1978 by Tony Tan Caktiong, it is the Philippines' top fast-food restaurant and is among the world's fastest-growing restaurant chains, having expanded its international presence almost sixfold from 2014 to 2024.

As of January 2024, there were over 1,668 Jollibee fast-food restaurants, including more than 400 outside the Philippines, operating in 17 countries including Canada, Hong Kong, Macau, Malaysia, Singapore, the United Kingdom, the United States, and Vietnam, as well as across the Middle East. Jollibee is best known for its Chickenjoy fried chicken.

== History ==
In 1975, Tony Tan Caktiong and his family opened a Magnolia ice cream parlor in Cubao, Quezon City. The outlet later began offering hot meals and sandwiches. When the food items became more popular than ice cream, the family decided to convert the ice cream parlor into a fast food restaurant, which became the first Jollibee outlet in 1978. Management consultant Manuel C. Lumba advised the family on the change in strategy. Jollibee was initially named "Jolibe", but changed its name to "Jollibee".

Jollibee Foods Corporation (JFC) was incorporated in January 1978. (Note: The JFC states that its date of incorporation was on January 28, 1978, while the Philippine Stock Exchange lists the date of incorporation as January 11, 1978.) By the end of that year, there were seven Jollibee branches in Metro Manila. The first franchised outlet of Jollibee opened in Santa Cruz, Manila, in 1979.

Jollibee experienced rapid growth. The chain was able to withstand the entry of McDonald's into the Philippines in 1981 by focusing on the specific tastes of the Filipino market. The first provincial Jollibee outlet opened in Mabalacat, Pampanga.

The first overseas Jollibee opened in Singapore in 1985 at the Katong Shopping Centre; that location closed only a year later (since returned in 2013). In the same year, Jollibee opened branches in the Middle East and Guam. Jollibee continued to expand and set up outlets both within the country and abroad.

Beyond its store endeavors, Jollibee also ventured into media, notably partnering with GMA for the children's magazine show Chikiting Patrol, which aired from 1996 to 2002.

In 1998, Jollibee expanded to North America with its first United States location in Daly City, California.

Jollibee first entered Europe in 2018 with the opening of a branch in Milan, Italy.

== Products ==
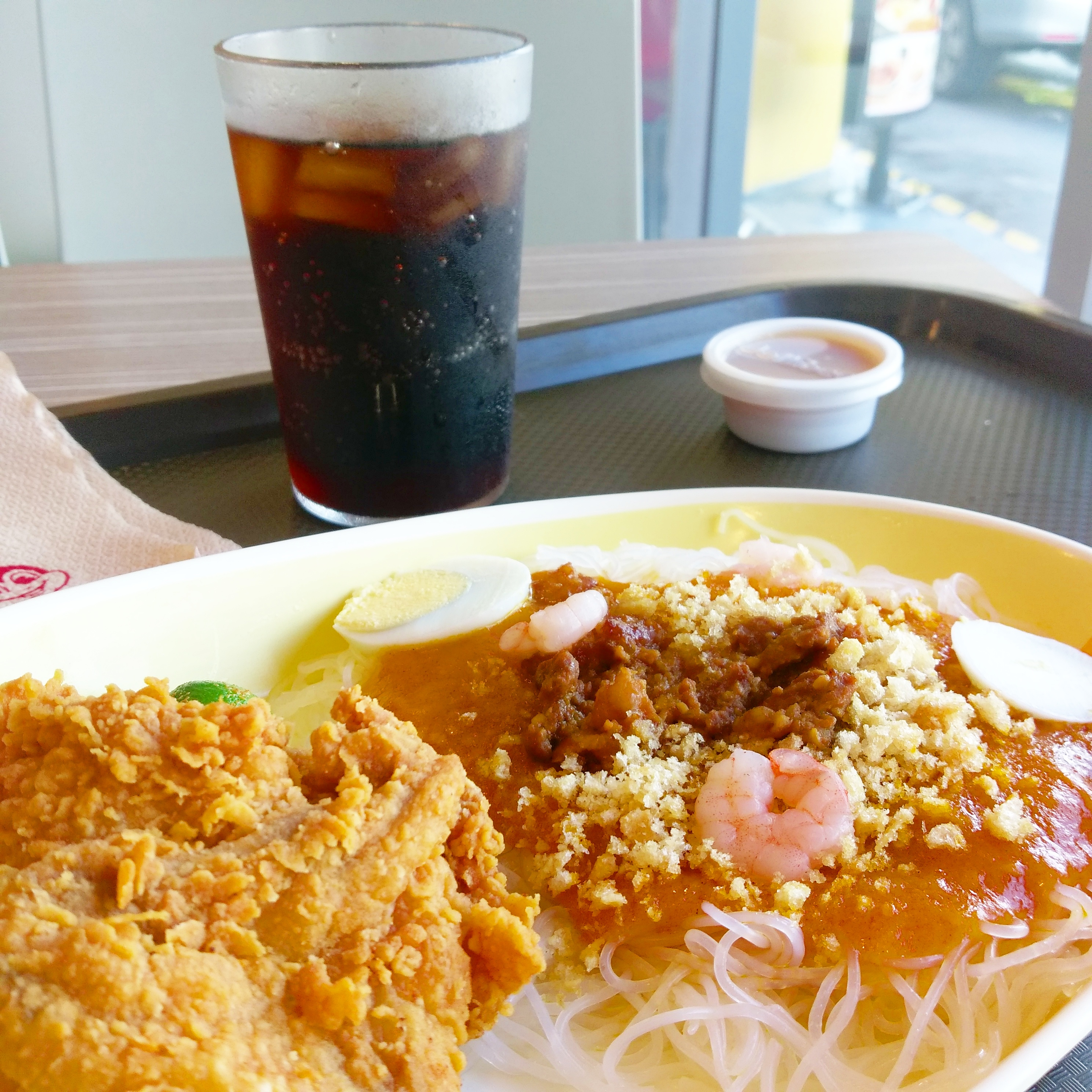
A piece of Chickenjoy alongside palabok, a traditional Filipino noodle dish

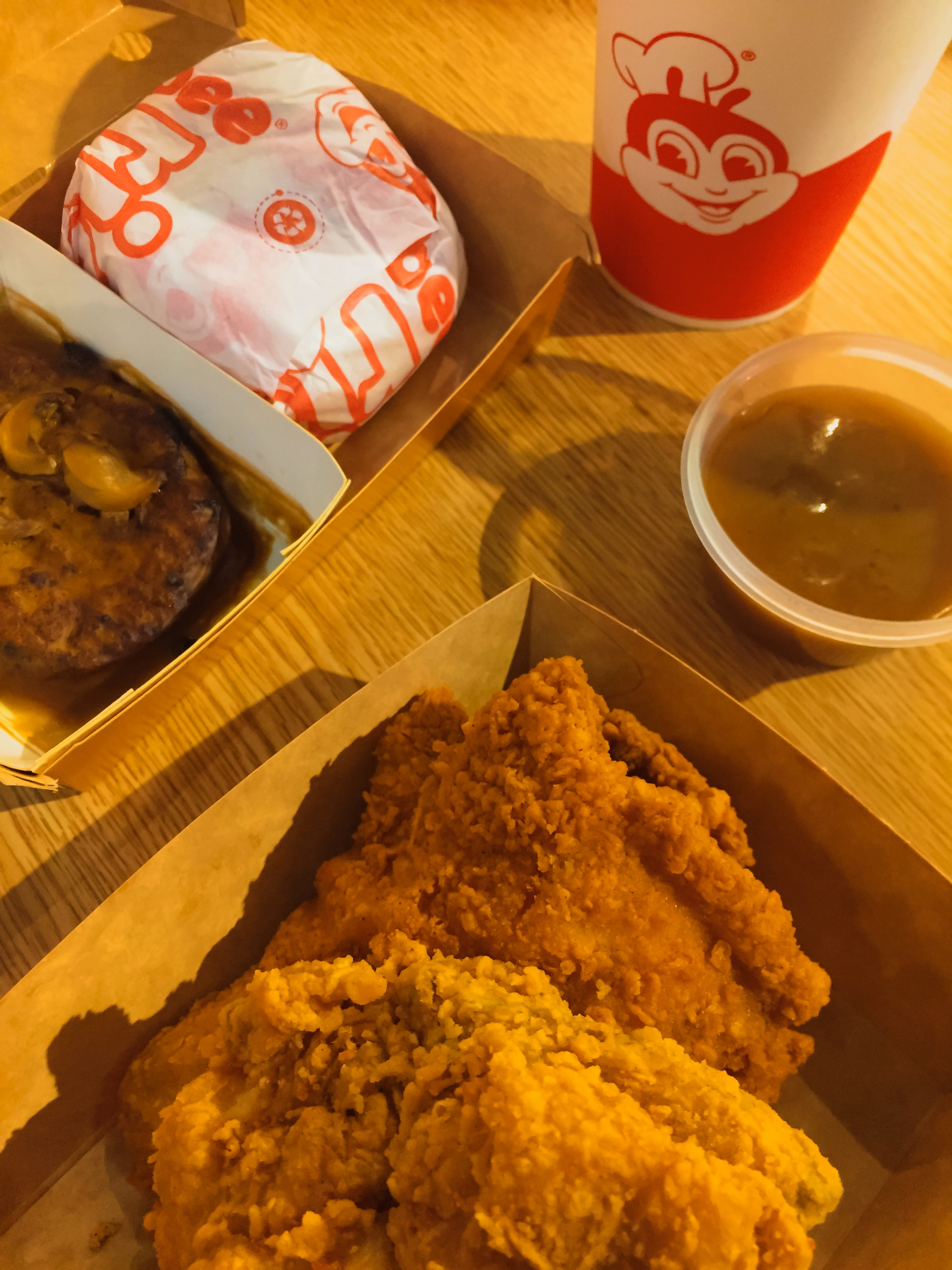
Two pieces of Chickenjoy, the chain's core product; along with gravy, Burger Steak and a serving of rice in Kuala Lumpur, Malaysia

Jollibee offers American-influenced fast food items and casual Filipino fare. Among the establishment's best sellers are the Yumburger, the house hamburger first introduced during their early days of operation; the Chickenjoy, a fried chicken meal, introduced in the 1980s, with regular and spicy versions; and Jolly Spaghetti, a sweet Filipino spaghetti that includes a beef sauce with pieces of hot dog and ham. In 1995, Jollibee introduced the Burger Steak to its menu. At its international locations, Jollibee also offers localized products, such as chili chicken in Vietnam and nasi lemak in Brunei. Jollibee serves Coca-Cola products in Luzon and Visayas and Pepsi products in Mindanao and its overseas markets.

=== Chickenjoy ===
The Chickenjoy is a crispy fried chicken meal. The meal can be ordered with several sides, including rice and gravy, fries, buttered corn, and spaghetti.

=== Yumburger ===
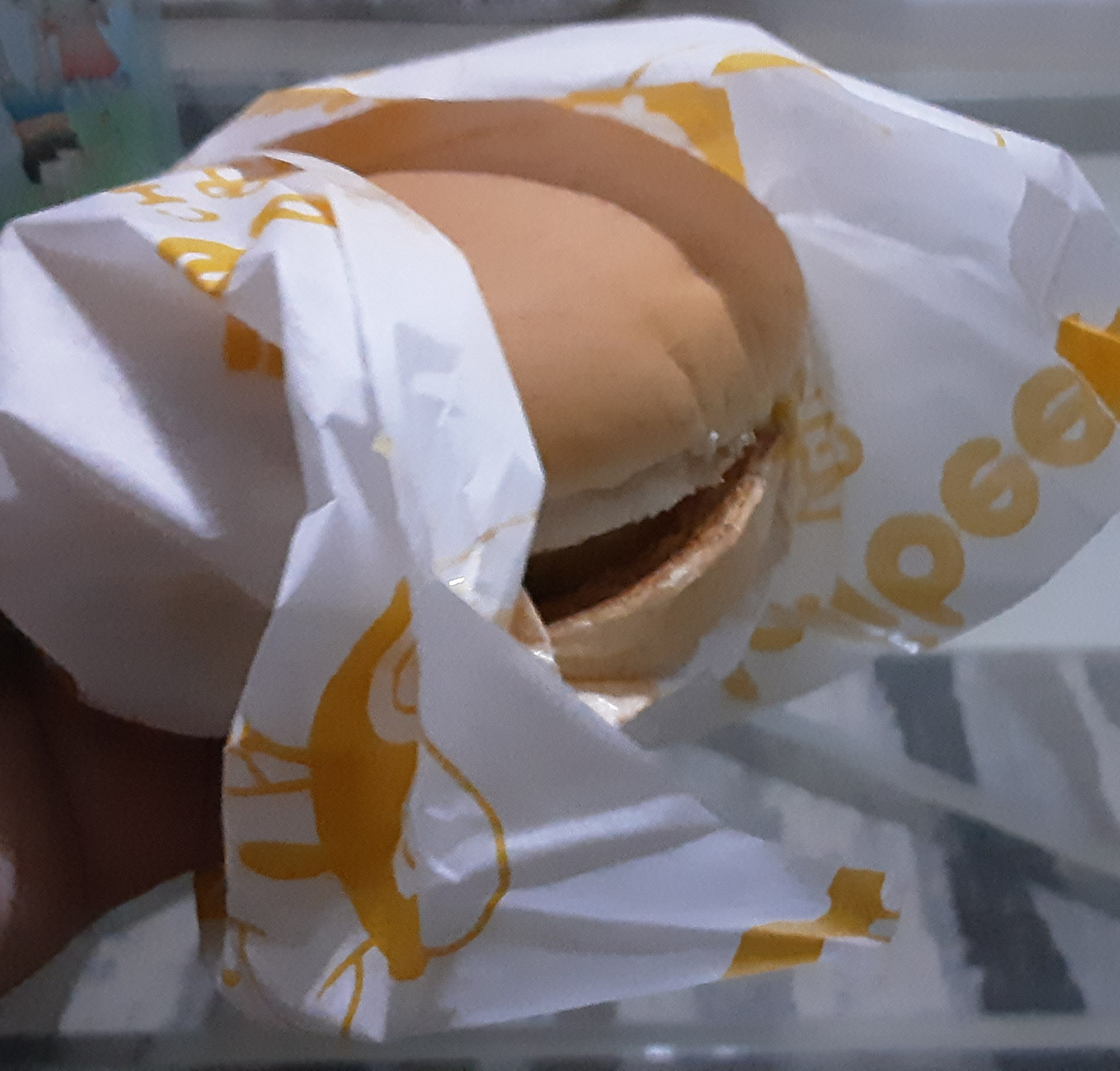
Cheesy Yumburger

The Yumburger (also spelled as Yum Burger, or Yum!), one of the first products sold by Jollibee, is a hamburger containing a beef patty topped with mayonnaise. In The Daily Telegraph, Michael Deacon described the Yumburger as "a slim, floppy, somewhat damp hamburger slathered with a strangely sweet mayo" in his three-star review of a Jollibee location in London.

In 2017, Jollibee introduced the Aloha Yumburger. That same year, an advertising video on YouTube about the Yumburger went viral in the Philippines. A 2019 Yumburger commercial about love on Father's Day was the subject of memes. Merchandise depicting the Yumburger was released in 2018 as a collectible toy set with the Jolly Kiddie Meal.

== Ownership and management ==
Jollibee is owned by the Jollibee Foods Corporation, which is based in Pasig, Philippines. JFC has operated as a franchisor since 1979. JFC also owns other fast food brands in the Philippines, including Chowking, Greenwich Pizza, Red Ribbon Bakeshop, and Mang Inasal, and it operates Burger King franchises.

== Branch locations ==
Branches around the world: Current locations Former locations Planned locations No current or planned locations

As of May 2019, Jollibee operated over 1,300 stores, with 1,150 in the Philippines and 234 in foreign markets. Jollibee has locations in Southeast Asia, East Asia, the Middle East, North America, Europe, and Oceania. Outside of the Philippines, Vietnam and the United States are the biggest markets for Jollibee; with 200 outlets in the former as of 2024 and 100 outlets in North America (plus Canada) as of 2024.

Countries and territories with previous presence of Jollibee outlets include Taiwan, mainland China, Indonesia, Northern Mariana Islands and Papua New Guinea.

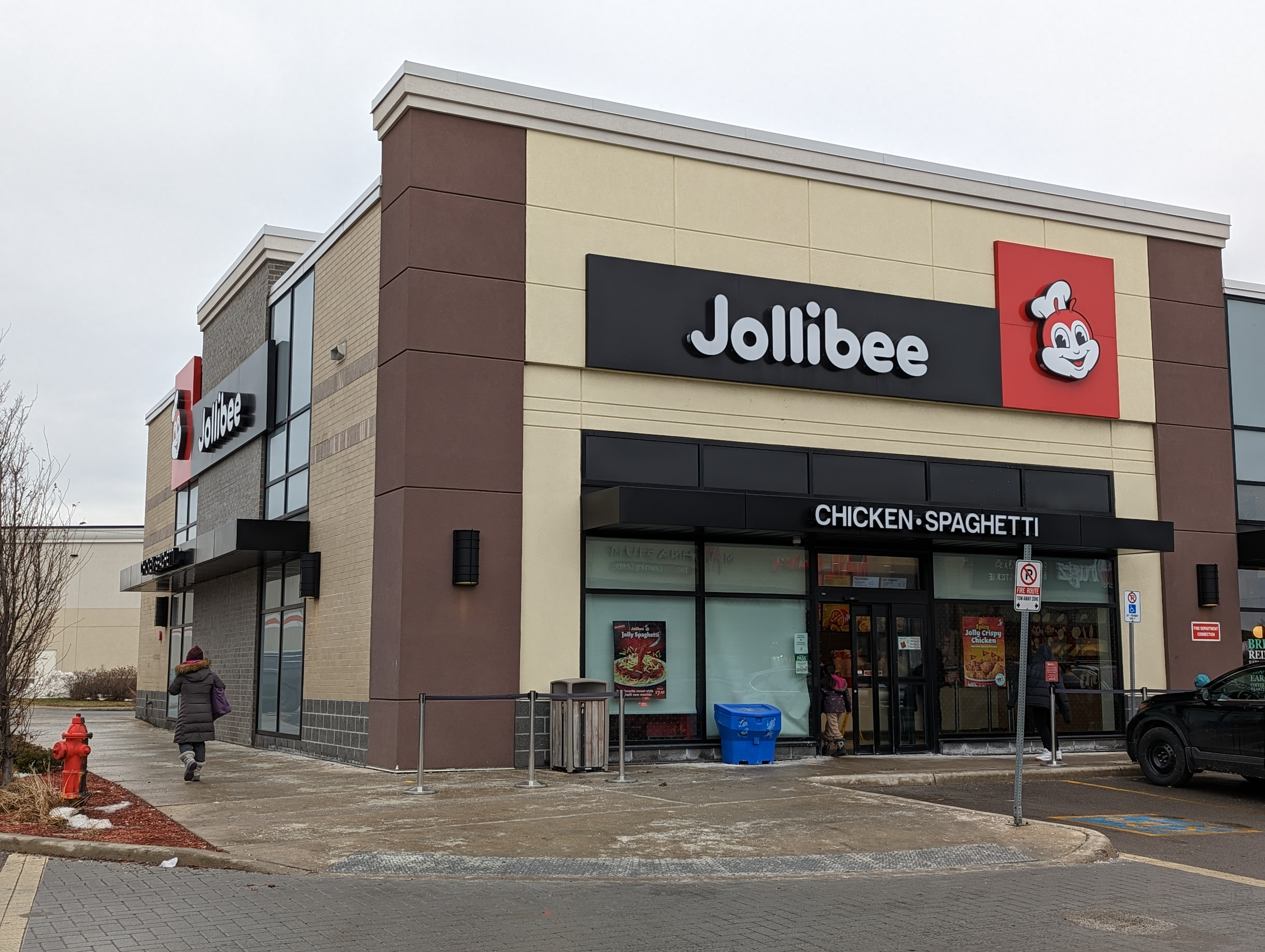
A Jollibee location in Toronto, Ontario, Canada

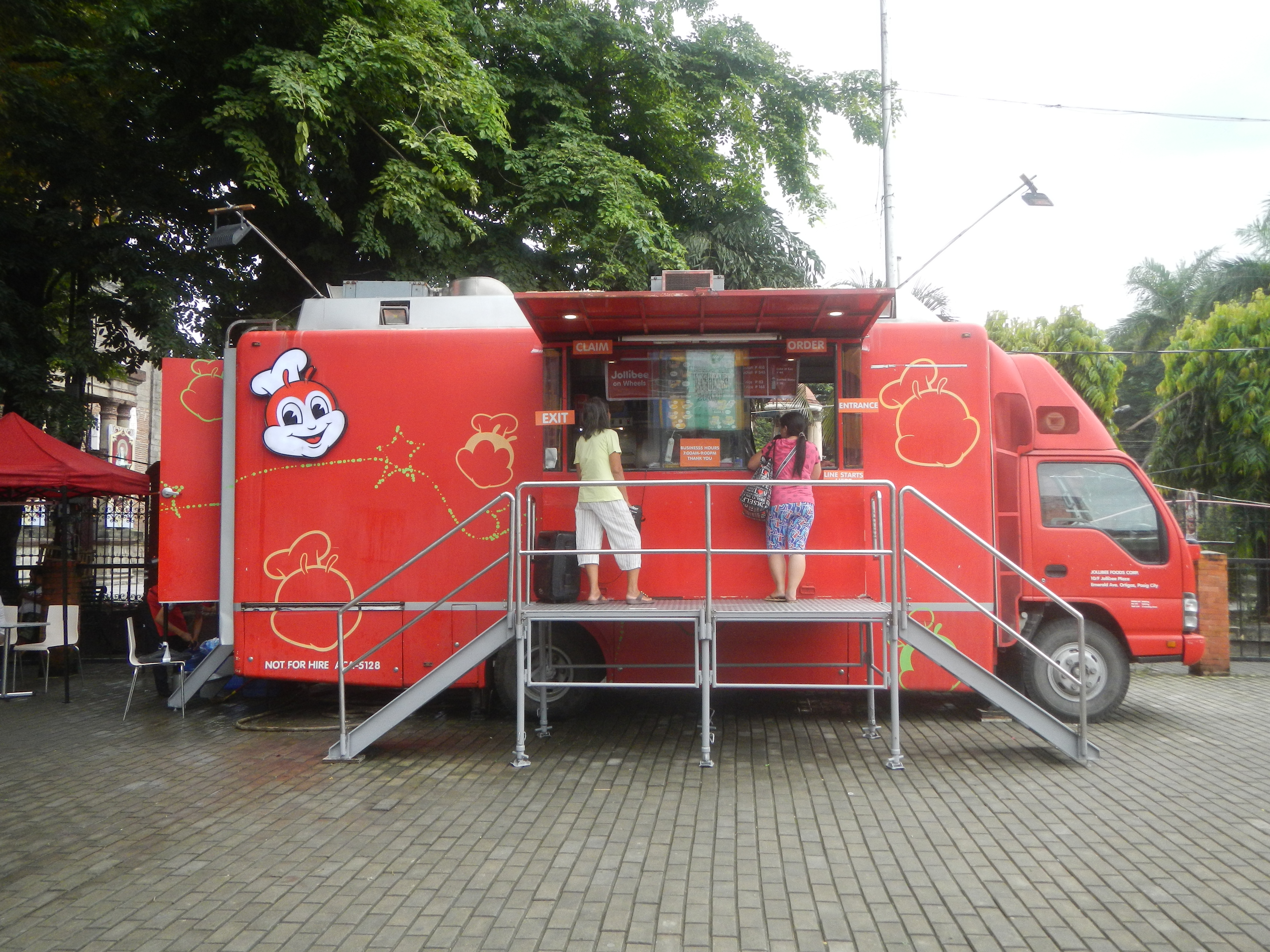
Jollibee food truck in Baliwag, Bulacan, Philippines

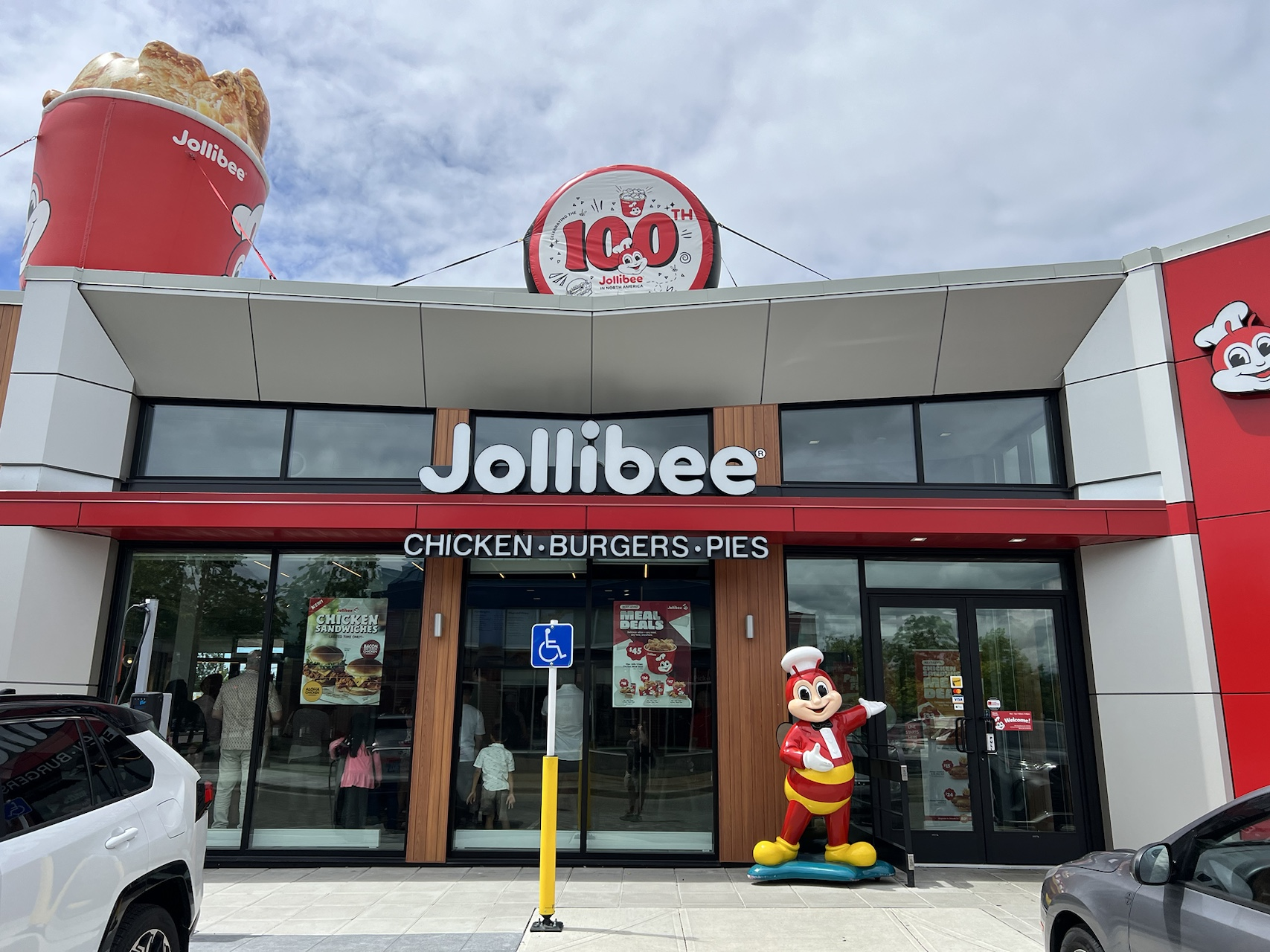
The 100th Jolibee store in North America, in Surrey, BC, Canada

== Marketing and advertising ==
=== Customer base ===
Outside of the Philippines, Jollibee's customer base varies by region. In the Middle East, Jollibee's primary market are overseas Filipino workers, while in Vietnam it is the local population. Vietnam has the most franchises outside of the Philippines, with over 100 locations.

=== Logo ===
Jollibee has been featuring its bee mascot in its logo since 1978. The "stacked logo" along the mascot of the fastfood chain are the first Intellectual Property Office of the Philippines (IPOPHL) registered well-known mark. The trademark designation was given in 2025.

The fast food chain's owner, Jollibee Foods Corporation, has a separate logo, with the current version adopted in 2025.

=== Mascots ===
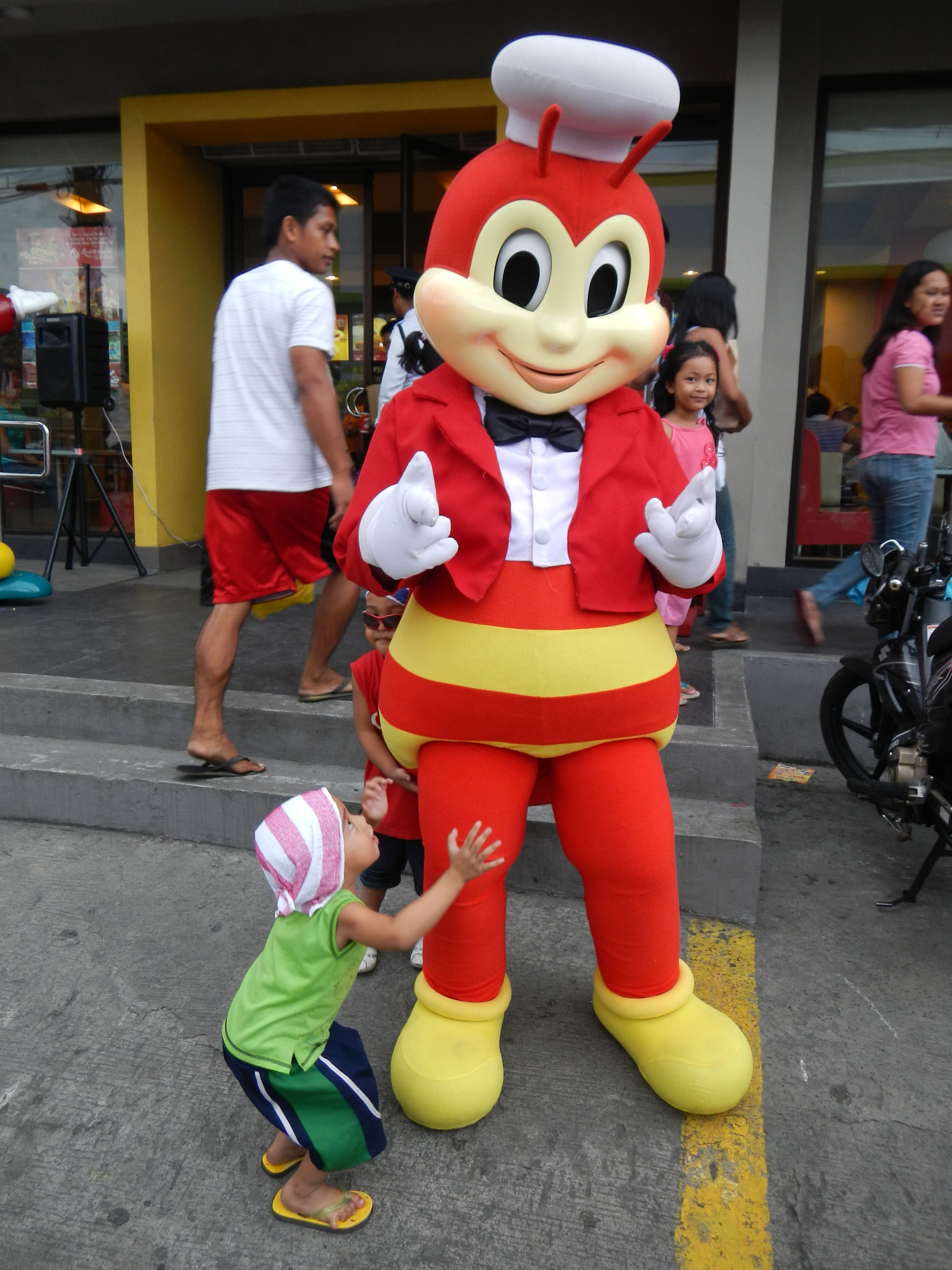
Jollibee mascot in Trece Martires, Cavite

Introduced in 1980, Jollibee is a large anthropomorphic bee mascot dressed in a red blazer, shirt, and chef's hat. Jollibee's design is based on Mickey Mouse. The mascot was designed to epitomize Filipino optimism. Tony Tan, Jollibee's founder, has compared the mascot's character to the Filipino working class, stating that the bee "hops around and produces sweet things for life, and is happy even though it is busy". The Jollibee mascot is an IPOPHL-registered well-known mark since 2025.

Jollibee developed additional mascots, some of which were featured in Jollitown, a children's show aired in the Philippines.

Name	Year introduced	Year discontinued	Representation
Jollibee	1980	—N/a	Main franchise mascot and chef, Filipino dishes
Chickee	1983	Early 2000s	Chickenjoy
Lady Moo	1983	Mid-1990s	Milkshakes
Mico	1983–1984	Mid-1990s	Breakfast and milkshakes
Champ	1984 (1st incarnation); 2020 (2nd incarnation)	2004 (1st incarnation)	Champ premium hamburger
Mr. Yum / Yum	circa 1980–1983 (as Mr. Yum); 2008 (as Yum)	2008 (as Mr. Yum) present (as Yum)	Burgers
Twirlie	1988	—N/a	Sundaes
Popo	circa 1980–1984	—N/a	French fries
Hetty	1984	—N/a	Spaghetti

=== Television series ===
On April 13, 2008, Jollibee premiered Jollitown, a children's television show. The premiere was timed to coincide with Jollibee's 30th anniversary. The show featured several characters, including Jollibee, Yum the scientist, Twirlie the star performer, Hetty the cheerleader, and Popo the gym coach. The show aired Sundays at 9:30 a.m. on GMA Network. On July 17, 2011, Jollitown moved to ABS-CBN for its fourth and fifth seasons, airing Sundays at 9:00 a.m. On July 20, 2013, the show moved back to GMA Network for its sixth season until it ended on October 12.

=== Web advertising ===
In November 2018, the 23 original Kwentong Jollibee videos on its YouTube channel reached a total of 64 million views. After nearly two years the total views had risen to 405 million, with 567,000 subscribers, in July 2020.

== See also ==
- Filipino cuisine
- Filipino pastries
