= Fruitas Holdings =

Philippine food and beverage company

- Type: Public
- Traded as: PSE: FRUIT
- Industry: Food and beverage
- Founded: 2000; 26 years ago (as Lush Enterprises); February 18, 2015; 11 years ago (as Fruitas Holdings); SEC Identification Number: CS201503014
- Founder: Lester Yu
- Headquarters: Manila, Philippines
- Key people: Lester Yu (President and CEO) Rogelio M. Guadalquiver (Chairman)
- Products: Food and beverages, pastries, desserts
- Website: fruitasholdings.com

Fruitas Holdings, Inc. is a food company in the Philippines which maintains several food and beverage kiosk chains including its flagship brand, Fruitas. It is publicly listed on the Philippine Stock Exchange.

== History ==
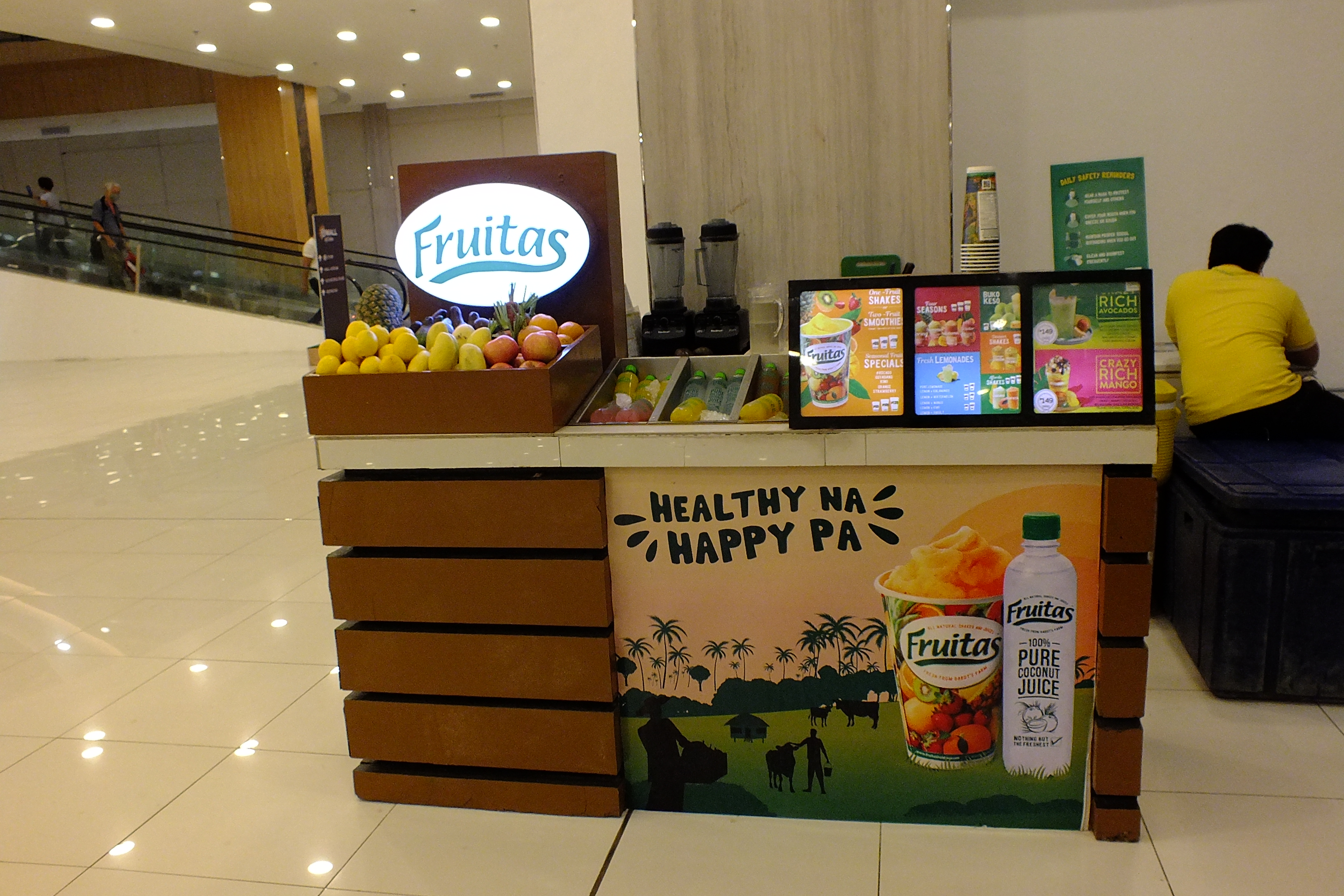
Fruitas kiosk at Gaisano Mall of Cebu

Fruitas Holdings, Inc. traces its history to the Lush Enterprises Corporation which was incorporated in 2000. The company opened the first outlet of its flagship fruit juice and shake brand, Fruitas Fresh from Babot's Farm at SM City Manila in 2002. It was started by businessman Lester Yu who previously made a failed venture in the pearl shake business through Lush Coolers.

In 2004, Lush Enterprises introduced Juice Avenue. In 2005, Buko Ni Fruitas was launched. A year later, Black Pearl was launched in 2006.

In 2011, Fruitas Ice Candy was launched, based on the Filipino ice candy snack. The Buko Loco, Friends Fries, Tea Rex, and Fruitas House of Desserts brands were launched in 2012.

In 2013, Lush Enterprises introduced 7,107 Halo-Halo Islands. On February 18, 2015, Lush Enterprises Corporation was renamed to Fruitas Holdings. It was incorporated and registered with the Securities and Exchange Commission and established to manage Fruitas and at least 23 other food and beverage kiosk brands. In 2015, Fruitas Holdings also acquired Negril Trading Inc, the owner of De Original Jamaican Pattie Shop and Juice Bar.

In 2016, Fruitas Holdings launched Shou, Johnn Lemon, and Fancie.

In 2018, Sabroso Lechon was acquired by Fruitas Holdings.

In 2019, Fruitas Holdings launched the initial public offering of around 533.66 million common shares to be listed at the Philippine Stock Exchange at a price of PHP 1.68 per share.

In 2020, Fruitas introduced Soy & Bean. It also announced plans of acquiring 100% of food delivery service company CocoDelivery.

In 2021, Balai Pandesal was fully acquired by Fruitas Holdings. The business was placed under Balai Ni Fruitas Inc., which made its initial public offering a year later in 2022.

In July 2022, Fruitas Holdings, through its subsidiary Soykingdom, Inc., acquired LN Banaue Inc., which operates the Ling Nam restaurants with three outlets in Metro Manila and a restaurant in Baguio and Puerto Princesa.

In June 2023, Fruitas Holdings acquired Fly Kitchen Inc., a virtual restaurant operator of eight food brands.

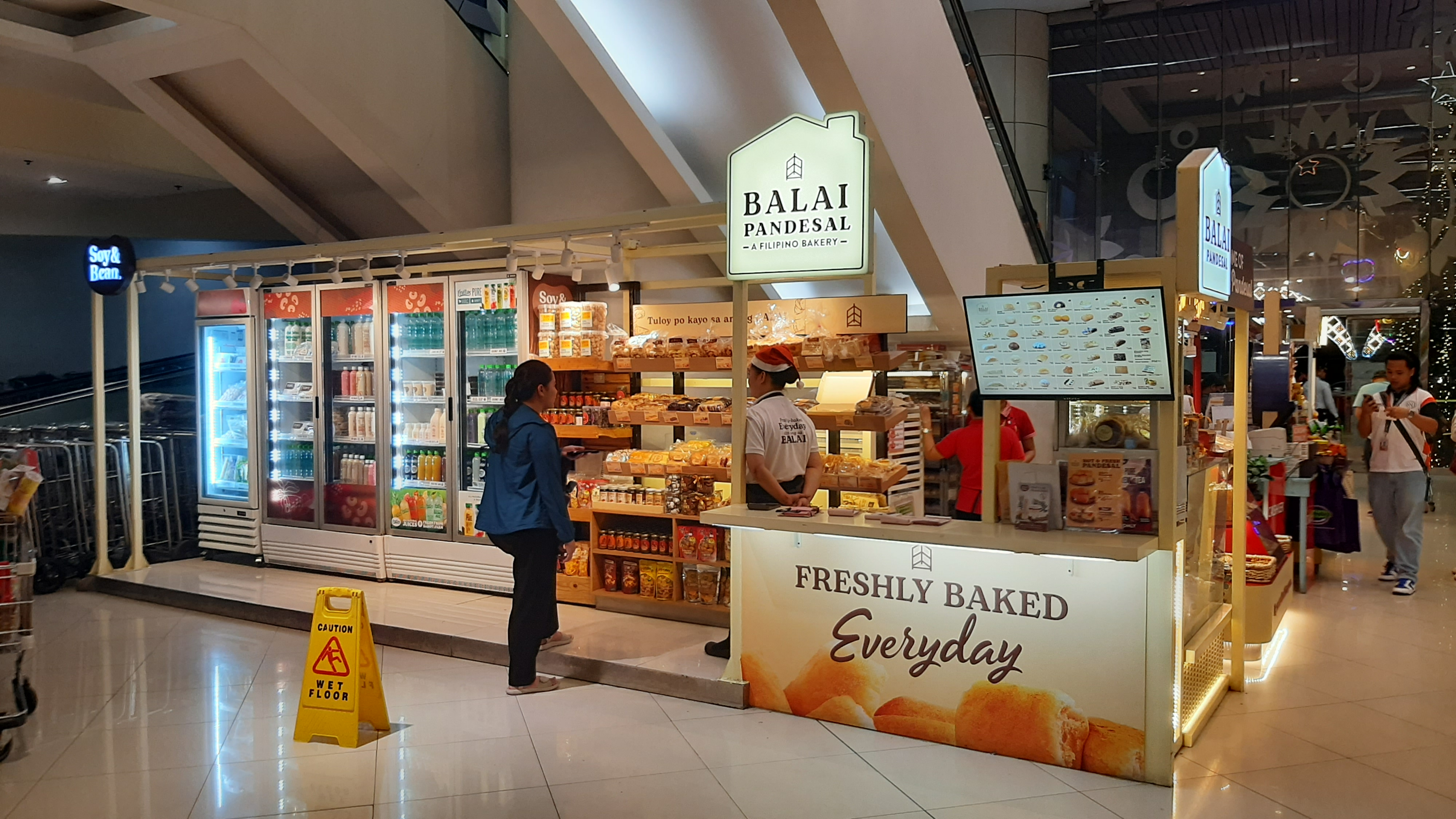
Balai Pandesal branch in Trinoma, Quezon City

In April 2024, Balai Ni Fruitas Inc. acquired Sugarhouse, a 40-year old bakeshop and catering business.

== Locations ==
As of 2023, the Fruitas brand has more than 800 stores across the Philippines.
