= Seaoil =

Filipino fuel company

Seaoil Philippines
- Type: Private
- Industry: Oil and gas
- Founded: 1978
- Founder: Francis Yu Hua Ting
- Headquarters: Taipan Place, Ortigas Center, Pasig, Philippines
- Area served: Philippines
- Key people: Francis Glenn Yu (President & CEO)
- Products: Fuel; Lubricants
- Website: www.seaoil.com.ph

Seaoil Philippines, Inc. is a dual Filipino-Australian fuel company founded in 1978. The company offers a variety of petroleum products ranging from automobile gasoline to industry-specific lubricants and services such as storage and shipping.

== History ==
Seaoil Philippines was founded in 1978 by Francis Yu Hua Ting, operating storage facilities for petroleum and petrochemical based products. A few years later, it expanded its operations in the petroleum market. In 1988, the company partnered with Paramins to develop lubricants. In anticipation of the oil market deregulation in 1996, Seaoil Philippines established a retail station in 1997, and as of December 2022, now has 700 stations.

In December 2017, SEAOIL entered a strategic partnership with Caltex Australia (now Ampol). As part of the partnership, Caltex Australia would supply oil to SEAOIL via its fuel trading and shipping business, Ampol Singapore, while Caltex Australia would take up a 20% equity interest in SEAOIL. Caltex Australia's acquisition of the 20% equity interest was completed in March 2018.

== Products ==
A gasoline station of Seaoil

Seaoil gasoline products are compliant with the Biofuels Act of 2006, which mandates the blending of 1 percent CME (coco-methyl ester) for all diesels in May 2007 (upgraded to 2 percent in 2009), and blending of 10 percent ethanol into gasoline and other product lines in 2009.

=== Fuel ===
- Extreme 97
- Extreme 95
- Extreme U
- Exceed Diesel
- E85 (available at the Pasig Boulevard branch in Pasig)

== See also ==
- List of gas station chains in the Philippines
