= Emperador =

Emperador may refer to:

- the Spanish equivalent of the title "emperor";
  - in particular Holy Roman Emperor Charles V, who was also King of Spain
- Emperador, Valencia, a municipality in eastern Spain.
- Emperador (tables game), an historical Spanish tables game akin to the English game
- Red Emperador, another name for the Australian wine grape Emperor
- A brand of cookies made by the Mexican company Gamesa
- Emperador Distillers Inc., a subsidiary of Alliance Global Group Inc. of the Philippines, best known for its Emperador (brandy)
- Emperador (brandy), the world's top-selling brand of brandy by volume
- A fish, such as a member of the Lethrinidae family or the emperor angelfish
- Emperador dark, a Turkish dimension stone, quarried near Denizli
- Emperador marron or Emperador oscuro, a Spanish dimension stone, quarried near Buñol

== See also ==
- Imperator totius Hispaniae
