= Boracay Newcoast =

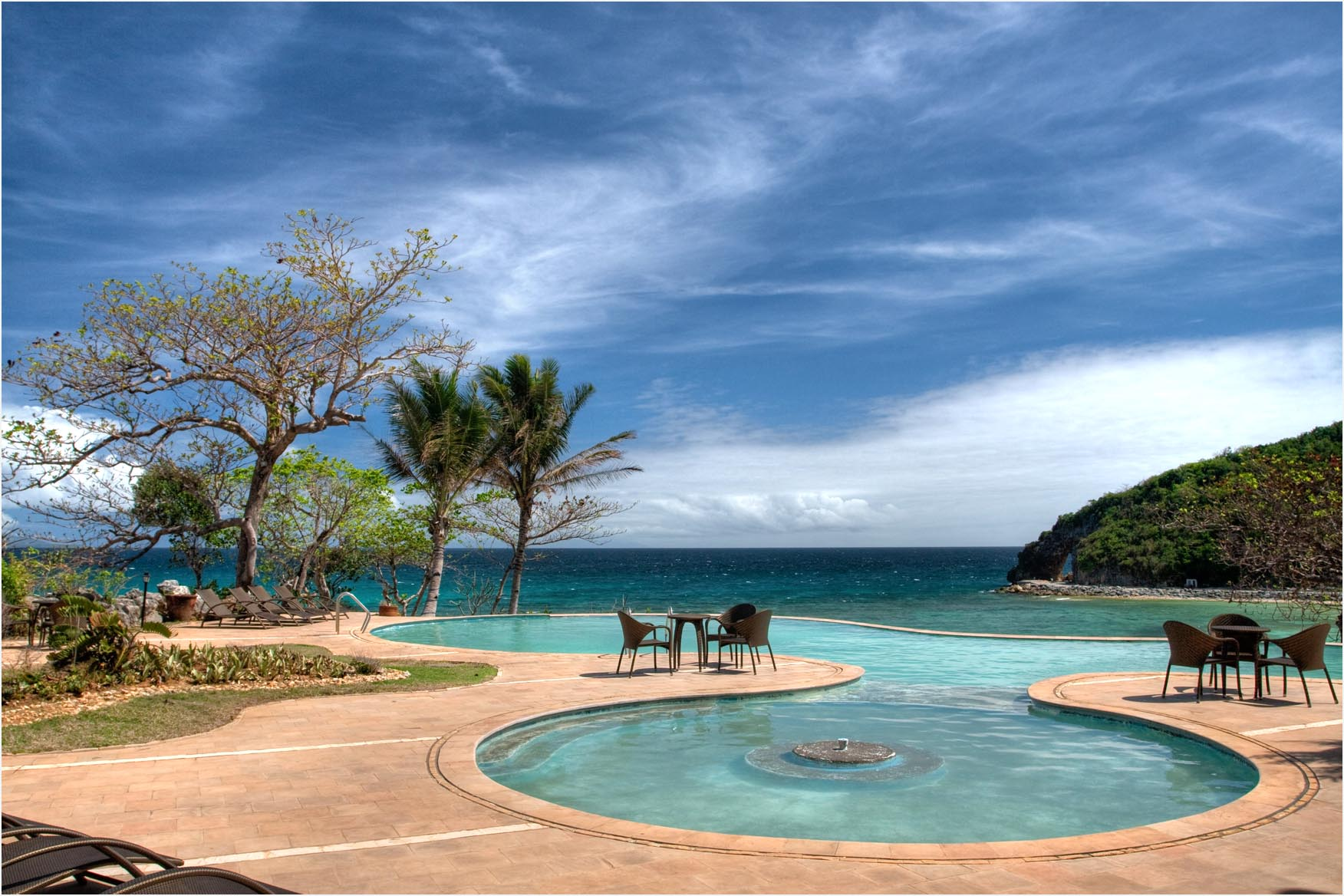
- Fairways & Bluewater resort in 2010

Project
- Developer: Fil-Estate Land (1995–2011); Global-Estate Resorts (2011–present)
- Website: boracaynewcoast.com.ph

Physical features
- Divisions: Oceanway Residences, Fairways & Bluewater, Newcoast Village

Location
- Interactive map of Boracay Newcoast
- Coordinates: 11°59′06.6″N 121°55′22.2″E
- Country: Philippines
- Region: Western Visayas
- Province: Aklan
- Municipality: Malay
- Location: Boracay

Area
  - Total: 150 ha (370 acres)

Boracay Newcoast is a township located in Barangay Yapak at the northeastern tip of Boracay island of Malay, Aklan, Philippines.

Initially developed by Fil-Estate Land Inc (FELI) in the late 1990s and 2000s. The development was acquired by Alliance Global in 2011 and is being improved and managed by Global-Estate Resorts, Inc. (GERI) ever since.

== History ==
=== Under Fil-Estate Land ===
Boracay Newcoast on Boracay island was initially developed by Fil-Estate Land Inc (FELI). In the late 1990s, FELI developed the Fairways & Bluewater golf course and residential villas. Fil-Estate has spent at least ₱2 billion, having envisioned to make Boracay island as "one of the world's major tourist destination" by 1998 through its project.

Work on the golf course began in 1995, and was formally launched on May 24, 1996, with Fil-Estate begin offering proprietary club shares. Actual work to finish the golf course continued. The golf venue during its development received some backlash particularly on its potential impact on water supply of the island. FELI's environmental friendly design was met with skepticism. It was finished by 1997.

The project also includes the construction of low-rise buildings or "villas". However, Fil-Estate was affected by the 1997 Asian financial crisis which slowed down development of the project. Twenty one villas projected to be finished in 2001 had the financial crisis never happened remains unfinished as of 2005.

=== Under GERI ===
Alliance Global of Andrew Tan acquired majority stake FELI on January 20, 2011, which was later renamed as Global-Estate Resorts, Inc. (GERI). Alliance Global has inherited the Newcoast Boracay. Megaworld absorbed GERI as its subsidiary in 2014.

Boracay Newcoast, was further developed by its new owners. In 2017 and 2019, the Savoy Hotel Boracay and Belmont Hotel Boracay respectively opened. A convention center was inaugurated in 2022.

In September 2024, Boracay Newcoast started venturing into halal tourism with the opening of the Maharba Boracay cove.

== Features ==
Boracay Newcoast is characterized by Alliance Global as a 150 hectares (370 acres) "master-planned tourism estate" or a township. It has eleven residential projects, four hotels, a commercial and entertainment district. It has three private coves

Hotels

- Belmont Hotel Boracay – A three-tower 442-room hotel complex within Boracay Newcoast.
- Chancellor Hotel Boracay – a 554-room condo hotel under construction
- Fairways & Bluewater Boracay – a 20-building 850-room hotel complex. It has a 18-hole par-72 golf course designed by Graham Marsh
- Savoy Hotel Boracay – a 559-room, six-storey hotel.

Other developments

- Boracay Newcoast Convention Center (BNCC) – 1,200-seater convention center.
- Marhaba Boracay – a 850-square-meter (9,100 sq ft) cove area with a white beach, facing the Lapus-Lapus rock formation. It is intended for halal tourist destination to accommodate the beliefs and sensibilities of Muslim patrons. The name of the beach comes from the Arabic word for 'welcome'.
- Oceanway Residences – residential condominium
