= L&P =

L&P may refer to:

- Lemon & Paeroa, a New Zealand soft drink
- Letters and Papers of the Reign of Henry VIII
- Lea & Perrins, a UK food manufacturer
- Lignell & Piispanen, a Finnish drink company
