= Emperador brandy =

Brand of cut brandy and brandy

Emperador Inc.
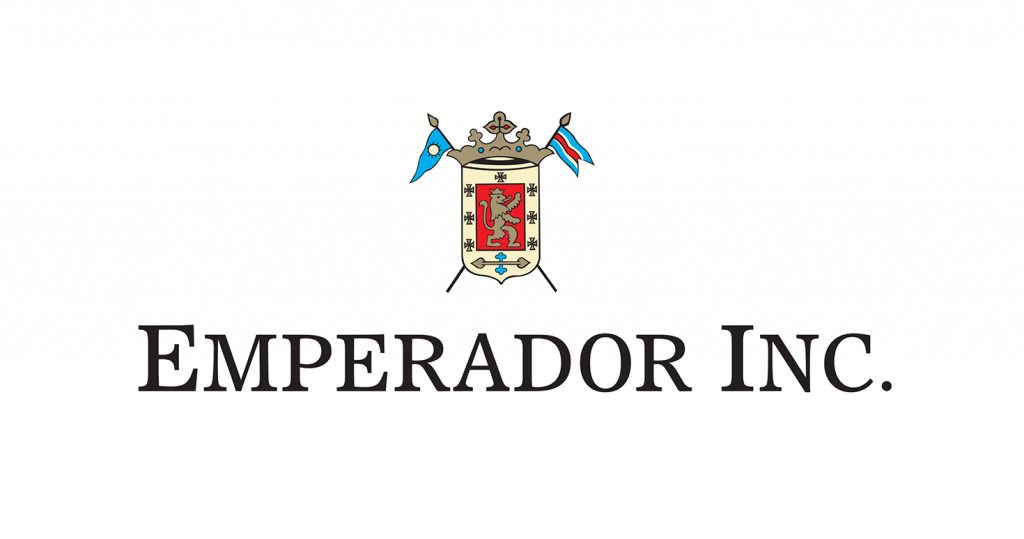
- Company type: Publicly held subsidiary
- Traded as: PSE: EMI; SGX: EMI
- Industry: drink industry
- Founded: 2001; 25 years ago (company)
- Headquarters: Head office: Eastwood City CyberPark, Bagumbayan, Quezon City, Philippines; Manufacturing plant: Santa Rosa, Laguna
- Area served: Philippines
- Key people: Andrew L. Tan (Chairman); Winston S. Co (Director, President & CEO)
- Products: Distilled beverages
- Parent: Alliance Global Group
- Website: Official website

Emperador is a brand of cut brandy and brandy produced by Emperador Inc., an 81% owned subsidiary of Alliance Global Group in the Philippines. The shares of Emperador Inc. are traded at the Philippine Stock Exchange with the symbol "EMP". The beverage is primarily sold in the Philippines, and has expanded to Thailand, China, and the United States.

== History ==
Emperador Brandy was launched in 1990 as the Philippines' first brandy label. One of its first endorsers was the radio and television journalist Noli De Castro during the 1990s.

Since 2006, it has been the world's top-selling brand of brandy in terms of quantity of brandy sold.

In 2010, Emperador Light was introduced with lower alcohol content. The light product is a liqueur containing flavorings, sweeteners, and neutral spirits alcohol made from sugarcane, in addition to brandy. Sales increased from 57 million liters in 2009 to nearly 300 million liters in 2015.

After acquiring Bodega San Bruno in Jerez, Spain, the brand introduced an Emperador Deluxe variant in 2013. In 2014, Emperador Inc. purchased the Scotch whisky producer Whyte & Mackay for £430m. In 2015, Emperador Inc. made a deal with Beam Suntory for the purchase of several brands and production facilities for P13.8 billion (€275 million). The deal included the purchase of Fundador Pedro Domecq and Bodegas Fundador (Spain's largest and oldest brandy dating to 1730 with facilities in Jerez and Tomelloso), Terry Centenario (Spain's top-selling brandy), Tres Cepas (Equatorial Guinea's top brandy brand), and Harveys (the UK's top brand of sherry).

Emperador publicly published its financial data for the first time in 2016.

== Description ==
The Emperador Light expression (introduced in 2010) is considered a "cut brandy" rather than a true brandy, as it contains neutral spirits alcohol made from sugar cane.

In early 2015, the brand was estimated to have a 97% share of the brandy market and a 50% share of the overall spirits market in the Philippines (population 100 million), and a 73% share of the spirits market in Manila.

== Awards ==
In the 2016 International Review of Spirits organized by the Beverage Testing Institute in Chicago, Emperador Solera Reservada received a rating of 89 points and a silver award (highly recommended), and Emperador Light was rated at 83 points and received a bronze award (recommended).
