= Cut brandy =

Liquor made of brandy, neutral grain spirit and water

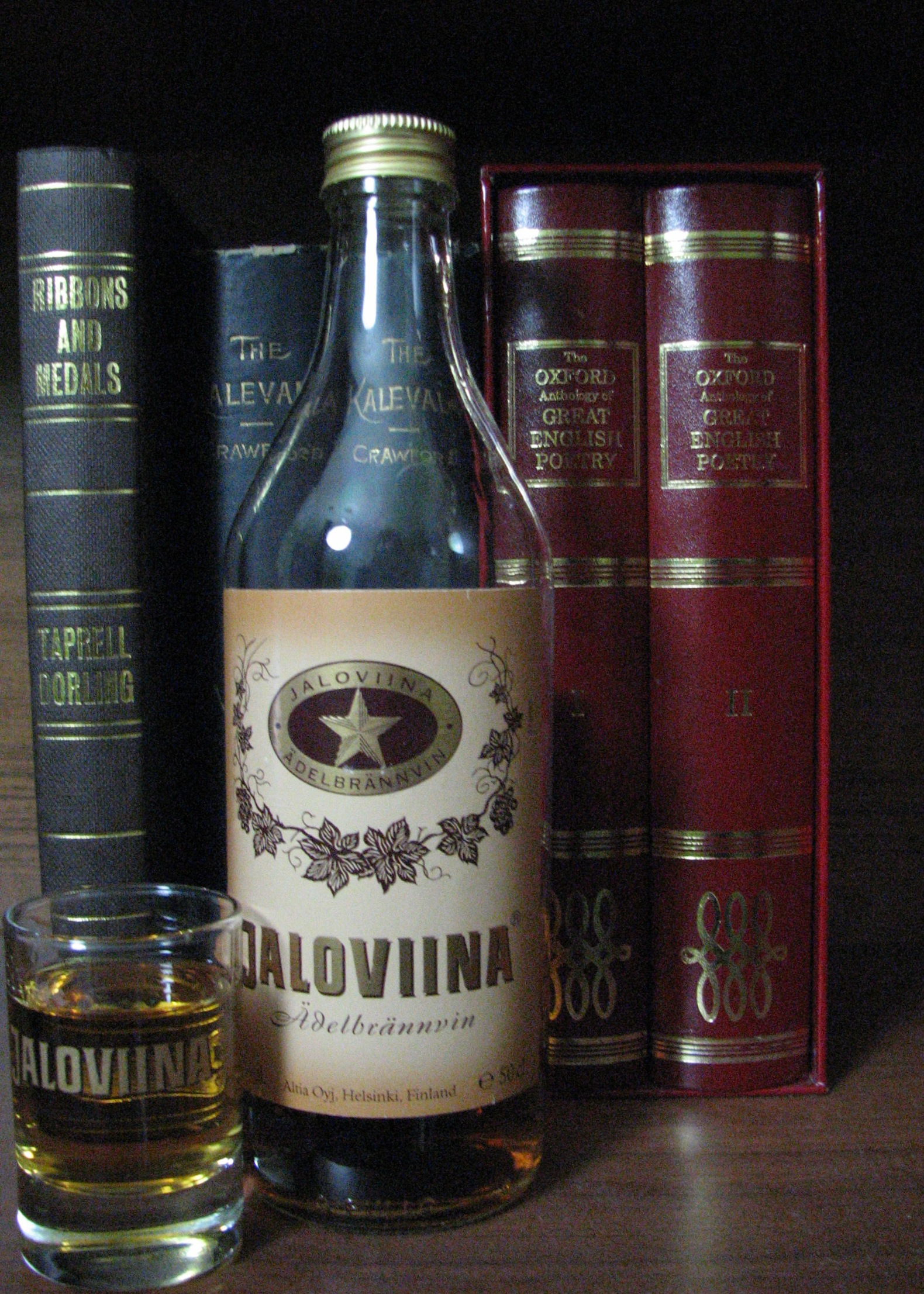
Image of a 50cl bottle of Jaloviina, a Finnish cut brandy.

Cut brandy is a liquor made of brandy, neutral grain spirit and water. Sometimes, sugar is used to soften taste. It is often colored with caramel color.

== Grades ==
Most cut brandies are graded by the relative amount of brandy it contains. Grades are represented by stars.

- 0 stars, almost no brandy at all, only some bringing color to the grain liquor.
- 1 star, one-quarter (1/4) of brandy
- 2 stars, half of brandy (seldom used)
- 3 stars, three-quarters (3/4) of brandy

== Regional variants ==
=== Finland ===
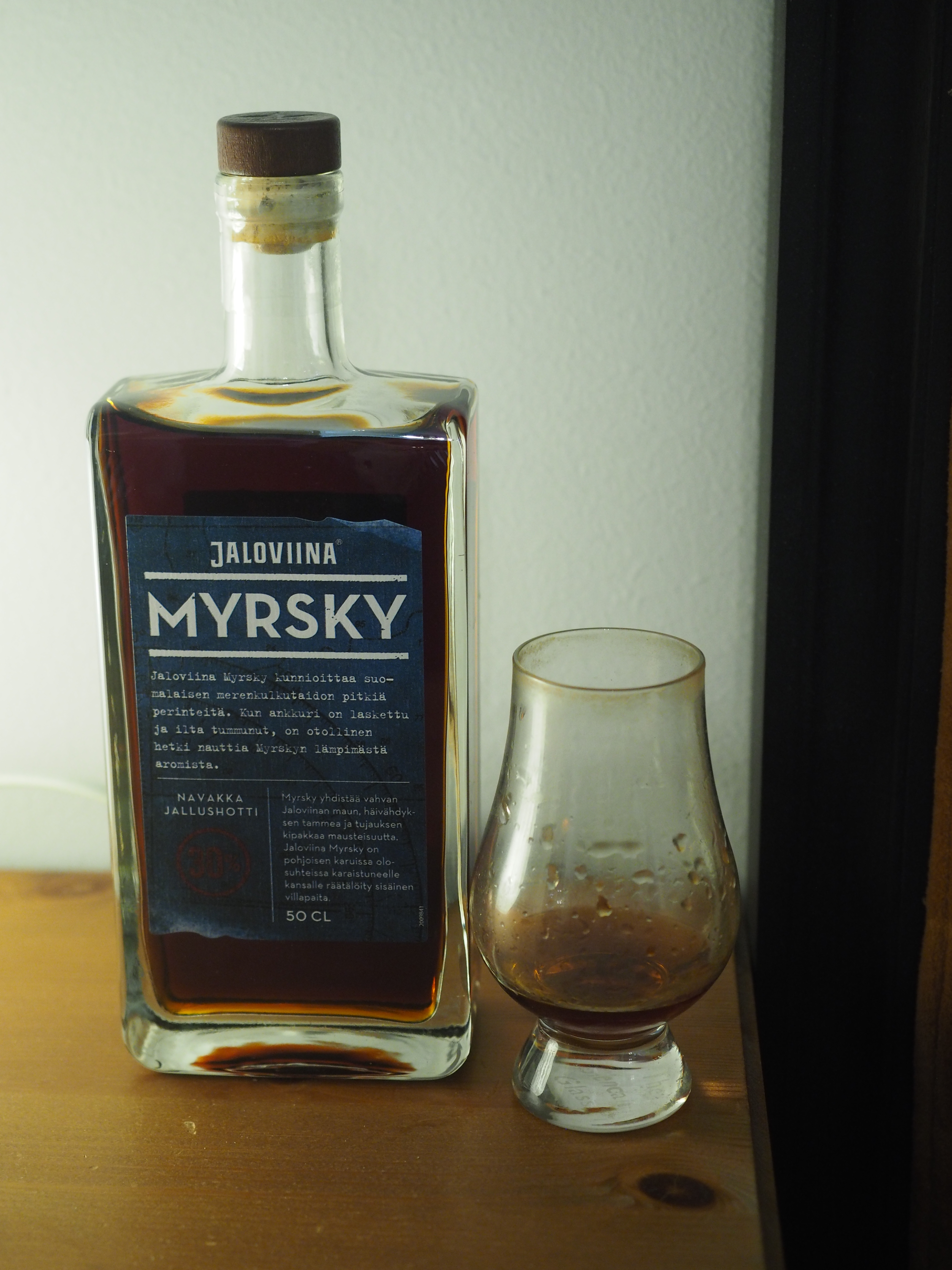
Jaloviina Myrsky is a Jaloviina-based herbal liqueur.

The Finnish Jaloviina ("noble Brännvin", colloquially Jallu) is a cut cognac with 38% (one star) or 40% (three stars) ABV. It has a strong taste and 4–7 grams of sugar per liter, depending on the grade. Special or vintage batches are also bottled, these may have slightly higher alcohol and sugar content. The brandy used for Jaloviina is cognac. Jaloviina Tammi is a limited-edition bottling to celebrate the Finnish independence.

Because of the stars used to grade Jaloviina, different varieties have acquired nicknames based on Finnish military ranks. No-star cut brandy is called vääpeli (non-commissioned officer), one-star cut brandy is called vänrikki, two-star cut brandy is called luutnantti (lieutenant) and three-star cut brandy is called kapteeni (captain). Another popular nickname for one-star cut brandy is seriffi (sheriff).

In the Second World War, cognac rations distributed to troops in celebration of Marshal Mannerheim's birthday on 4 June 1942 were actually cut cognac. The bottles were labeled simply with plain military supply labels. In 2017, Lignell & Piispanen started selling a reproduction, labeled Puolustuslaitos Leikattua (konjakkia ja viinaa).

=== Germany ===
In Germany, particularly in former East Germany, cut brandy (German: Weinbrandverschnitt) is widespread. German cut brandy is never graded; a large majority of the cut brandy on the German market would fall into the zero stars category. A typical characteristic of German cut brandy is its unusual low alcohol content, generally between 28% and 32% alcohol by volume. Therefore it has a very soft taste which is possibly the reason for its popularity in Germany. German cut brandy also has a very distinct taste, quite different from genuine brandy and other cut brandies like Finnish Jaloviina.

Most brands of cut brandy in Germany are of East German origin and the eastern states of Germany are also the most important market for cut brandy. This has historical reasons. In the East German planned economy there was very often a shortage of brandy and cut brandy was produced as a substitute. Eastern German cut brandy is traditionally called Goldbrand (cut brandy with at least 10% brandy) or Goldkrone (cut brandy with at least 20% brandy), both colloquially called Goldi. The very few cut brandies of West German origin do not use these names.

The most popular German cut brandy is Wilthener Goldkrone which is also the most popular distilled beverage in Germany. As of 2002, it was the best-selling spirit in Germany by volume. However, only relatively few Wilthener Goldkrone is sold in former West Germany since cut brandy is much more popular in the eastern part of the country. German cut brandy is often used for rather simple mixed drinks. If drunk neat, it is generally cooled and served in shot glasses. Some, however, prefer to drink it like brandy from snifters and at room temperature.

=== Philippines ===
The largest-selling brand of cut brandy in the world, by product volume, is Emperador, a brand primarily sold in the Philippines. The brand had total annual sales volume in the range of 270–300 million liters in 2012 through 2015. The highest-selling variant of the brand is Emperador Light, which is a 27.5% ABV blend made from Spanish brandy and spirits from sugar cane – likely to be in the zero-stars category. In the Philippines, it is simply called brandy, with no clear indication that it is not 100% brandy.
