= Cocoroco =

Alcoholic beverage from Bolivia

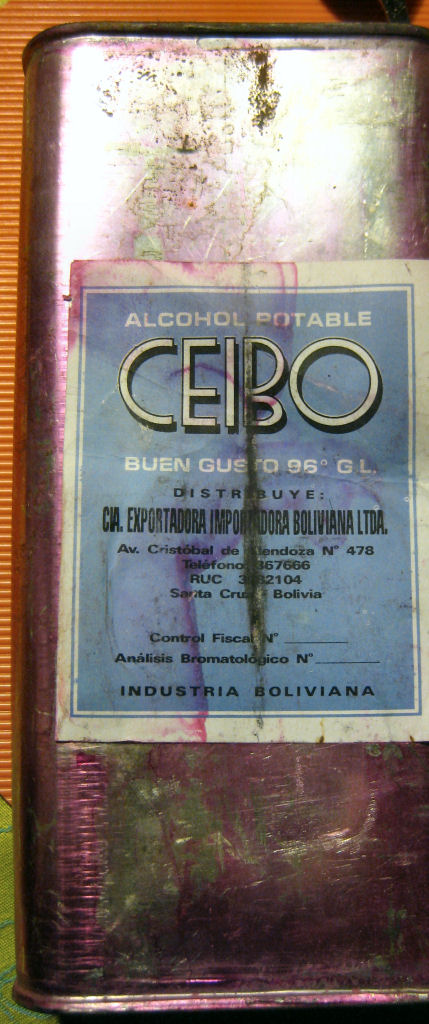
Cocoroco can

Cocoroco is a Bolivian rectified spirit made of sugar cane with a purity of 96%. Cocoroco is sold as "potable alcohol", most often in tin cans.

Like rum, cocoroco is made from sugar cane. Unlawful trade of cocoroco and coca leaves occurs across the Altiplano among Aymara communities living in Chile and Bolivia. Cocoroco is illegal in some neighboring countries such as Chile where all alcoholic drinks with over 55% alcohol content by volume are illegal.

Notable brands of cocoroco include Caiman and Ceibo.

== See also ==
- Toxicity of alcohol
- Cachaça, a typical Brazilian alcoholic beverage
- Fernet, a typical Italian and Argentine alcoholic beverage
- Pisco, a typical Peruvian and Chilean alcoholic beverage
- Rectified spirit
- Singani, a typical Bolivian alcoholic beverage
