= Grand Westside Hotel =

Hotel complex in Parañaque, Philippines

- Interactive map of the Grand Westside Hotel area

General information
- Coordinates: 14°31′10″N 120°58′54″E
- Inaugurated: June 22, 2024
- Owner: Megaworld Corporation

Technical details
- Floor count: 19

Other information
- Number of rooms: 1,530

Website
- www.grandwestsidemanila.com/en

The Grand Westside Hotel is a hotel complex in Parañaque, Metro Manila, Philippines. With 1,530 rooms, it is the largest hotel in the Philippines in terms of room count. It is set to be rebranded as the Mövenpick Manila Bay Westside in 2026.

== History ==
Megaworld Corporation announced as early as 2015 that it would be developing Westside City, a township within the Entertainment City in Parañaque The plan includes the construction of two hotels under a homegrown Filipino branding – the Kingsford Hotel and the Grand Westside Hotel. At the time the Grand Westside was only planned to have 685 rooms.

The hotel complex was developed by Megaworld Corporation as its 19th hotel. With 1,530 rooms, it is set to become the largest hotel in the Philippines in terms of room count.

The first tower was set to open in late 2023, while the second tower was projected to be finished in 2024.

The hotel was inaugurated on June 22, 2024 with Philippine President Bongbong Marcos among the ceremony's guests.

On November 28, 2025, it was announced that the hotel will be rebranded into Movenpick Manila Bay Westside as part of a partnership by Accor and Megaworld Corporation, which is set to be the largest Movenpick hotel in the world. The rebranding is expected to apply sometime in 2026.

== Facilities ==
The Grand Westside Hotel consist of two 19-storey buildings which will host a total of 1,530 rooms. Aside from the hotel, the complex will host retail and commercial spaces on its first two levels.

The developers target to fulfill the requirements for a five star rating under the Department of Tourism's National Accommodation Standards once it is fully operational.

Other amenities to be constructed are a Grand Opera House, theaters and gambling facilities which is part of the Westside Resort.
