= Megaworld =

Real-estate company in the Philippines

Megaworld Corporation
- Logo adopted in August 2019

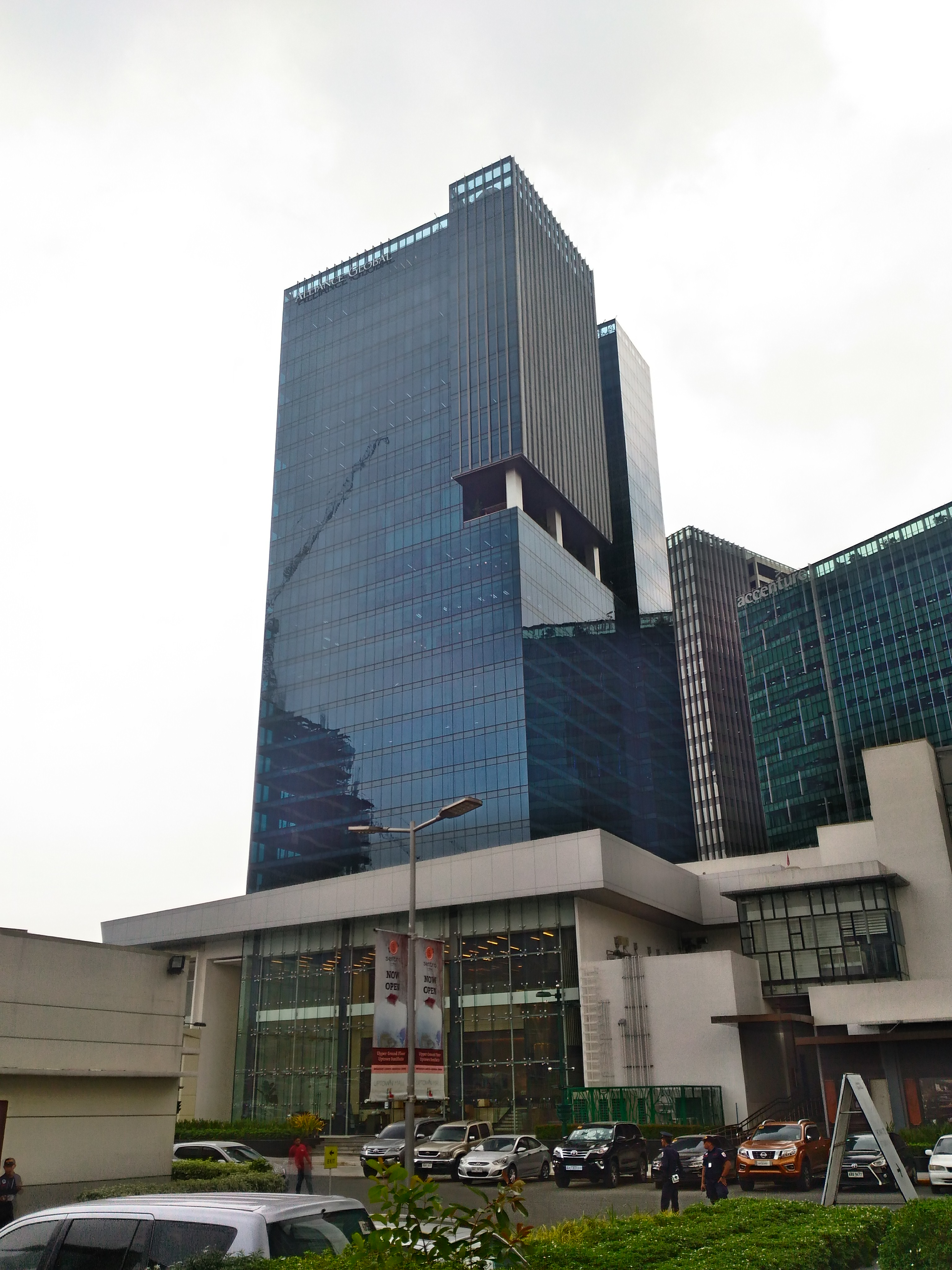
- Alliance Global Tower, current headquarters of Megaworld Corporation in Taguig
- Type: Public
- Traded as: PSE: MEG
- Industry: Real estate and lifestyle malls
- Founded: August 24, 1989; 37 years ago
- Founder: Andrew Tan
- Headquarters: Alliance Global Tower, Uptown Bonifacio, Taguig, Philippines
- Key people: Andrew Tan (Chairman & CEO); Lourdes T. Gutierrez-Alfonso (COO); Kevin Andrew Tan (EVP & Chief Strategy Officer); Francisco Canuto (Treasurer); Graham Coates (Head, Megaworld Lifestyle Malls)
- Revenue: ▼PH₱39.27 billion (2020)
- Operating income: ▼PH₱13.94 billion (2020)
- Net income: ▼PH₱9.89 billion (2020)
- Total assets: ▲PH₱375.69 billion (2020)
- Total equity: ▲PH₱185.46 billion (2020)
- Number of employees: 6,569 (2019)
- Parent: Alliance Global Group
- Website: megaworldcorp.com

Megaworld Corporation (PSE: MEG) is a real-estate company in the Philippines. It is listed on the Philippine Stock Exchange Composite Index. The company develops large-scale, mixed-use, planned communities incorporating residential, commercial, educational, and leisure components. In addition, it provides other services such as project design, construction oversight, and property management. Among its landmark projects is Forbes Town Center, a 6-hectare commercial and residential district in Fort Bonifacio, Taguig, Metro Manila. Another project by Megaworld is the 45-storey Petron Megaplaza office skyscraper, which was the tallest building in the country upon its completion in 1998. Also, last May 31, 2016, Megaworld announced that they will build two more office towers, 10-storey One Republic Plaza, and six-storey Emperador House, in Davao City. The two towers will provide an additional 30,000 sqm of office spaces for lease.

== History ==
Megaworld Properties & Holdings Inc. was founded by Andrew Tan and incorporated under Philippine law on August 24, 1989, primarily aimed at engaging in real estate development, leasing, and marketing.

In 1994, it spun off Empire East Land Holdings Inc., which focused on the middle income market. It was converted to a public company on July 15, 1994.

On August 19, 1999, the company changed its name to Megaworld Corporation in line with its conversion from a purely real estate company to a holding company, though the company's core focus continues to be on real estate.

In 2013, the company gained full acquisition of Suntrust Properties.

Andrew Tan has served as Chairman of the Board and President of the company since its incorporation in 1989.

Megaworld renewed its congressional franchise for another 25 years on June 26, 2014, one day after celebrating their silver anniversary. Under Philippine law, this real estate development company will operate with franchise from Philippine congress, an authority that limits and regulates development and operations of condominiums, hotels and shopping centers.

In July 2024, Megaworld named Lourdes T. Gutierrez-Alfonso as President and CEO. Fortune magazine listed her as 85th of 100 Most Powerful Women in Asia.

== Properties ==
The Megaworld Corporation has numerous development throughout the Philippines, ranging from malls, offices, townships, hotels, resorts, gaming services and residential developments. It also owns companies such as the Megaworld Lifestyle Malls (in retail developments), the Megaworld Prime RFO (targeting the upper middle income and high income markets), the Empire East Land Holdings Inc., and the Suntrust Properties Inc. (both targeting the middle-income market)

Megaworld Lifestyle Malls is the retail and commercial arm of Megaworld Corporation, and is one of the largest mall developers in the Philippines. The shopping mall chain was established following the success of Megaworld's first mall development, Eastwood Mall, in Quezon City.

=== Townships ===
In Metro Manila:

- Alabang West - a 62 hectare commercial and residential development in Las Piñas located near Alabang.
- Arcovia City - a 12.3-hectare (30-acre) mixued-use riverside township in Pasig.
- Eastwood City
- Forbes Town Center
- Grand Westside Hotel - a 1,530 room hotel complex.
- McKinley Hill - a 50 hectares (120 acres) mixed use development, inspired by Spanish and Italian Architecture, housing retail, offices, residential developments, including the famed Venice Grand Canal, Taguig and embassies from the United Arab Emirates, Qatar, United Kingdom, and South Korea.
- McKinley West- a 34.5 hectares (85 acres) mixed use development in Taguig
- Newport City - a 25 hectares (62 acres) development located near Ninoy Aquino International Airport in Pasay. The development includes the Resorts World Manila, hotels, prime offices, and retail and entertainment spaces.
- Uptown Bonifacio - a 15 hectares (37 acres) development in the Bonifacio Global City, it also houses the Uptown Complex and the Alliance Global Group Headquarters.
- Westside City - a 31 hectares (77 acres), P121 Billion development in Entertainment City consisting retail, residential spaces, and gaming, including the Westside City Resorts World Complex.

In Luzon:

- Capital Town - a 35.6 hectares (88 acres) development in San Fernando, Pampanga, standing in a land formerly owned by the Pampanga Sugar Development Company (PASUDECO) featuring the 17-story Saint-Marcel Residences, with 361 "smart home" units - Chelsea Parkplace condominium named after Chelsea, New York
- Highland City - a 24 hectares (59 acres) development in Cainta, Rizal. It is also located In Barangay, Manggahan, Pasig City.
- Ilocandia Coastown - an 84 hectares (207 acres) development in Laoag, Ilocos Norte. It is located adjacent to the Fort Ilocandia Hotel with a 1.40-kilometer beach line, along with an area of sand dunes. It is set to have residential developments, a shophouse district, commercial district, and its own town center.
- Maple Grove - a 140 hectares (350 acres) mixed use development in General Trias.
- Nascala Coast - a 116-hectare tourism and lesiure estate which will be developed by Global-Estate Resorts, Inc. in Nasugbu, Batangas
- San Benito Private Estate - a 25-hectare integrated active wellness township in joint venture with The Farm at San Benito group in Lipa, Batangas.
- Southwoods City - a 561 hectares (1,390 acres) mixed use development in Biñan, Laguna, consisting retail, residential developments, schools, a church, a cyberpark, a medical facility, open spaces, leisure facilities including a golf course, and its own transport hub.

In Visayas:

- Boracay Newcoast- a 150 hectares (370 acres) mixed use leisure and residential resort development in Boracay Island.
- Iloilo Business Park- a 72 hectares (180 acres) development in Iloilo City.
- The Mactan Newtown - a 30 hectares (74 acres) development in Lapu-Lapu, Cebu.
- The Upper East - a 34 hectares (84 acres) joint- venture development in Bacolod. Standing on a former sugar-processing complex owned by the Araneta Group.

In Mindanao:

- Davao Park District - an 11 hectares (27 acres) development in Davao City. It is to be classified as iTownship, it will integrate digital technology, design innovations and connectivity into the entire development.
- The Upper Central - an 117 hectares (289 acres) mixed use lifestyle development in Cagayan de Oro. Using land formerly owned by Fil-Estates (now Megaworld affiliate Global-Estate Resorts, Inc. (GERI) as "Mountain Meadows").

=== Offices ===
- The Alliance Global Tower - in Uptown Bonifacio.
- The Petron Megaplaza in Makati CBD
- The World Centre
- Torre Caleido and Torre Emperador in Madrid, Spain
- Diagonal Zero Zero in Barcelona, Spain

=== Residential ===
- Two Central and Three Central towers
- Manhattan Gardens - an 18-tower joint venture residential development with the Araneta Group, occupying 5.7 hectares (14 acres) in the Araneta City.

== Controversies ==
=== Trademark dispute with Donald Trump ===
In 2007, Megaworld renamed a high-rise condominium project formerly called "The Trumps" into "One Central" after American business magnate and eventual 45th President of the United States Donald Trump, who threatened legal action over the name, saying the name "Trump" was unmistakably associated with him.

=== Allegations of fraud by Datem, Inc. ===
On November 14, 2023, the Quezon City Regional Trial Court issued a court order to freeze Megaworld's assets in relation to projects involving Datem Inc., a construction company in the Philippines. Datem alleged that Megaworld "failed to fulfill its obligation to Megaworld in completing the projects that have been assigned to them."

In response, Megaworld announced that it will file criminal and civil cases against Datem. Megaworld denied the allegations, decried that the freeze order was absurd because Datem's claims only accounts for 0.2% of Megaworld's assets, and claimed that it "has not evaded any substantial claim for payments from Datem."
