= Marskin ryyppy =

Finnish alcoholic drink

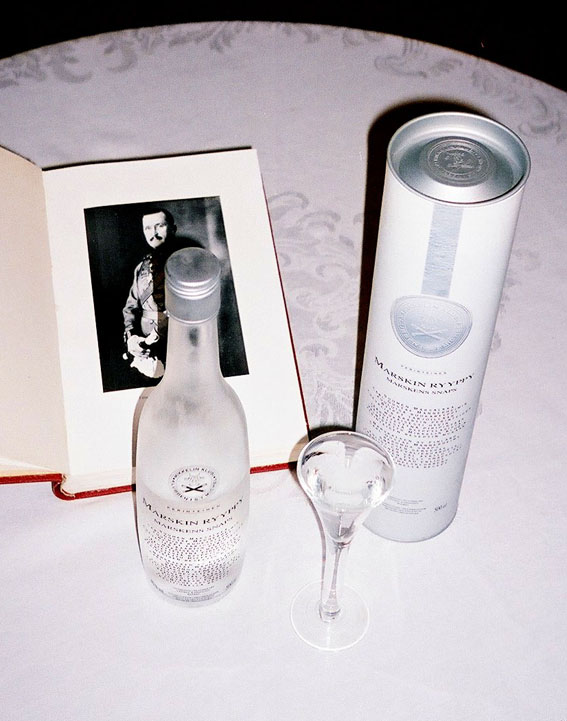
A bottle of Marskin ryyppy.

Marskin ryyppy (lit. The Marshal's drink/shot; Swedish: Marskens snaps) is a strong alcoholic drink of Finnish origin, served as a snaps. The drink is named after Carl Gustaf Emil Mannerheim, the Marshal of Finland. According to all sources it is important that the glass where the drink is served is poured as full as possible (to the point where surface tension keeps some of the drink in the glass); the glass is then to be emptied without spilling. This practice is said to originate in the Chevalier Guard, where Mannerheim once served, in which every man was entitled to one shot of vodka per day. Through this practice everyone was assured an equal (and maximum) amount. Marskin ryyppy must also be served ice-cold.

== Origin ==
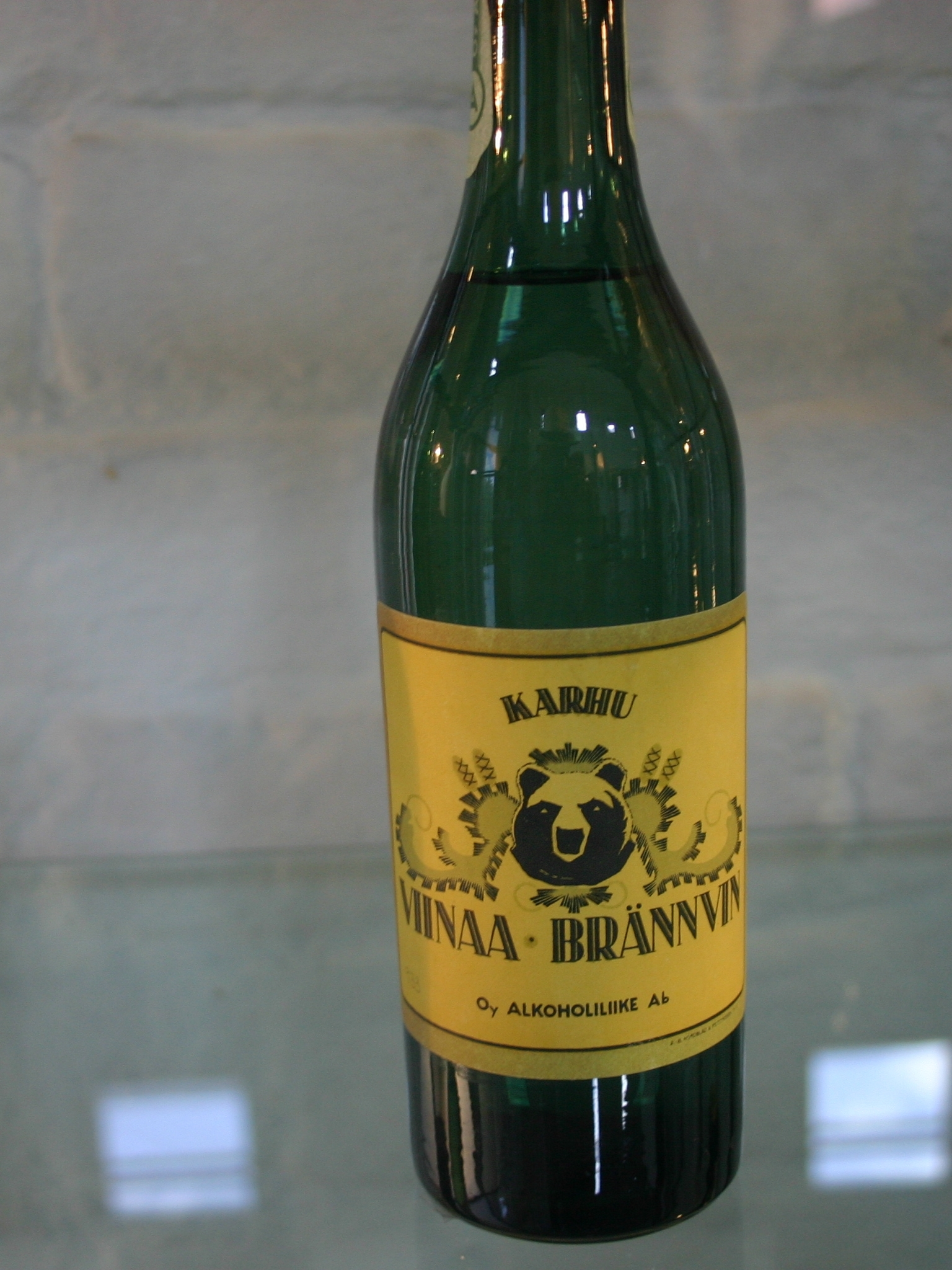
A bottle of Karhuviina (literally: "bear brännvin"), with a quarter of its alcohol content containing sulfites, an example of the low quality vodka sold in the 1940s.

The drink was originally created by Mannerheim's adjutant Ragnar Grönvall after the Marshal asked him to do something about the horrible flavour of the low quality vodka available during the Continuation War in the early 1940s. The goal was to mask the taste of cheap vodka by adding a dash of more expensive ingredients into the mix.

== Ingredients ==
The ingredients of the mixture have been up for debate for almost 50 years, and the original ingredients are not even available anymore. According to some sources the drink is to be made of:

- The Mannerheim internet project: 1 liter (1 L) of Rajamäki brand akvavit, 2 cL dry French vermouth and 1 cL gin.
- Alko's Etiketti magazine: 500 mL Extra brand akvavit, 500 mL Pöytäviina brand brännvin, 20 mL Noilly Prat vermouth and 10 mL gin.
- Taru Stenvall's book Marski ja hänen hovinsa (The Marshal and his noble court) of 1955: 1 liter Rajamäki brand akvavit, 20 mL vermouth and 20 mL gin. (In the first two editions of the book a somewhat absurd amount of 10 mL of akvavit was printed.)
- Juomanlaskija magazine (5/2000): 500 mL dry, unflavoured alcohol, 20 mL sweet vermouth and 10 mL gin.

== Trademark ==
The rights to the trademark Marskin ryyppy belonged to Mikkelin Klubi for a long time. In the year 1995 they rented the rights to produce Marskin ryyppy to a British company, Allied Domecq, for whom the drink was made by Lignell & Piispanen in Kuopio, Finland. In November 2005 Mikkelin Klubi announced that they had sold the trademark to an international beverage producer, Pernod Ricard. The exact amount for the purchase was not made public, but it was said to be "millions of old Finnish marks".

== Literature ==
- Uola, Mikko: Marskin ryyppy: marsalkkamme juomakulttuuria chevalier-kaartista ylipäällikön ruokapöytään. Suomalaisen Kirjallisuuden Seura, 2002. ISBN 951-746-385-5
