= Francis Showering =

English brewer (1912–1995)

Francis Showering CBE
- Born: 10 July 1912; Shepton Mallet, Somerset, England
- Died: 5 September 1995 (aged 83); Dorset, England
- Known for: Founder of Babycham
- Spouse: Hilda Foote (m. 1934; died 1981)

Francis Edwin Showering CBE (10 July 1912 – 5 September 1995), was an English brewer. His family company, Showerings, invented Babycham, a light, sparkling perry, launched in 1953 and originally marketed as "genuine champagne perry". In 1957, it became the first alcoholic product to be advertised on UK television.

== Early life ==
Showering was born in Shepton Mallet in Somerset, England, where his father was an innkeeper and brewer. The family business, Showerings, brewed beer and cider. He was educated at Shepton Mallet grammar school and then studied to become a chemist in Bristol. He married Hilda Foote in 1934. They had no children.

He and his three brothers all worked at Showerings; Francis eventually became managing director.

== Babycham ==
In the 1940s, the company developed a process to produce perry, a form of cider made from fermented pear juice—and created a low-alcohol sparking drink that was christened Babycham. The new drink was marketed mainly at young women, and sold in small bottles to be served in a champagne saucer: "the genuine champagne perry sparkling in its own glamorous glass". After disputes with French champagne producers, including a court case in 1978, H P Bulmer Ltd v J Bollinger SA, which held that marketing of a similar sparkling cider was not confusing, the reference to champagne was eventually prohibited by EU rules on protected designation of origin.

The drink became very popular, with its advertising slogan "I'd love a Babycham" and logo of a small chamois. To serve the burgeoning demand, the company bought pear orchards across the West Midlands, and planted new pear orchards in Somerset. Output in Shepton Mallet reached 108,000 bottles an hour in 1966, and new plants were opened in Ireland and Belgium.

== Later career ==
Showerings became a public company in 1959, and acquired William Gaymer, Vine Products, Whiteways, Britvic, and John Harvey & Sons. Showerings was itself acquired by Allied Breweries in 1968 for £108 million, and Showering was appointed as a director of Allied Breweries after the merger. His nephew Sir Keith Showering was vice-chairman from 1969 and then chairman and chief executive from 1975 to 1982, during which time Allied Breweries acquired Teacher's whisky and became Allied Lyons after the acquisition of the Lyons food and catering business in 1979.

Showering became vice-chairman of Allied Breweries in 1982, after his nephew's sudden death. He failed to buy back Showerings in 1991, and joined with the four sons of Sir Keith Showering to set up Brothers Drinks, with a new drink, Straight 8, a full-strength perry with 8 per cent alcohol.

== Later life ==
He was appointed a Commander of the Order of the British Empire (CBE) in the 1982 New Year Honours.

=== Death ===
Showering died in Dorset on 5 September 1995 and was buried in Shepton Mallet. He was survived by his second wife, whom he had married in 1981, a year after the death of his first wife.
