= John Harvey & Sons =

Wine blender and merchant

- Company type: Private company limited by shares
- Industry: Wine importer
- Founded: 1796
- Headquarters: Bristol, England
- Key people: John Harvey
- Parent: Alliance Global
- Website: harveyssherry.com

John Harvey & Sons is a brand (trading name) of a wine and sherry blending and merchant business founded by William Perry in Bristol, England in 1796. The business within 60 years of John Harvey joining had blended the first dessert sherry, dubbed 'cream sherry', which has changed little since 1880 and is known as Harveys Bristol Cream. The brand changed ownership several times, in 2015 bought by a subsidiary of Alliance Global Group of the Philippines.

== History ==
In 1796, the first iteration of Harvey's wine-trading business was established in Denmark Street in Bristol. This was owned by William Perry, who went into partnership with Thomas Urch. In 1822, Urch's nephew (John Harvey I) joined the firm as an apprentice. By 1839, John Harvey was senior partner in the Bristol branch of the family business and by 1871, the whole business was known as John Harvey & Sons.

Bristol Cream sherry exports to America boomed from 1928 onwards with Jack Harvey making trips there as often as he could. From 1962, the business was known as Harveys of Bristol Ltd. In 1966 the firm, including all subsidiaries, was bought out by Showerings, Vine Products & Whiteways Ltd. After 1960, the business relocated from Denmark Street to Whitchurch Lane, Hartcliffe, and the Denmark Street cellars became Britain's only wine museum, with an adjoining restaurant. Both closed in 2003.

The brand was sold to Beam Global in 2010 and then to Grupo Emperador, Inc. in 2015, which is owned by Alliance Global Group of the Philippines.

By 2016, the bar Harveys Cellars was located on the Denmark Street site.

The records of John Harveys & Sons are held by Bristol Archives (Ref. 40913) (online catalogue).

== Bristol Cream and other products ==
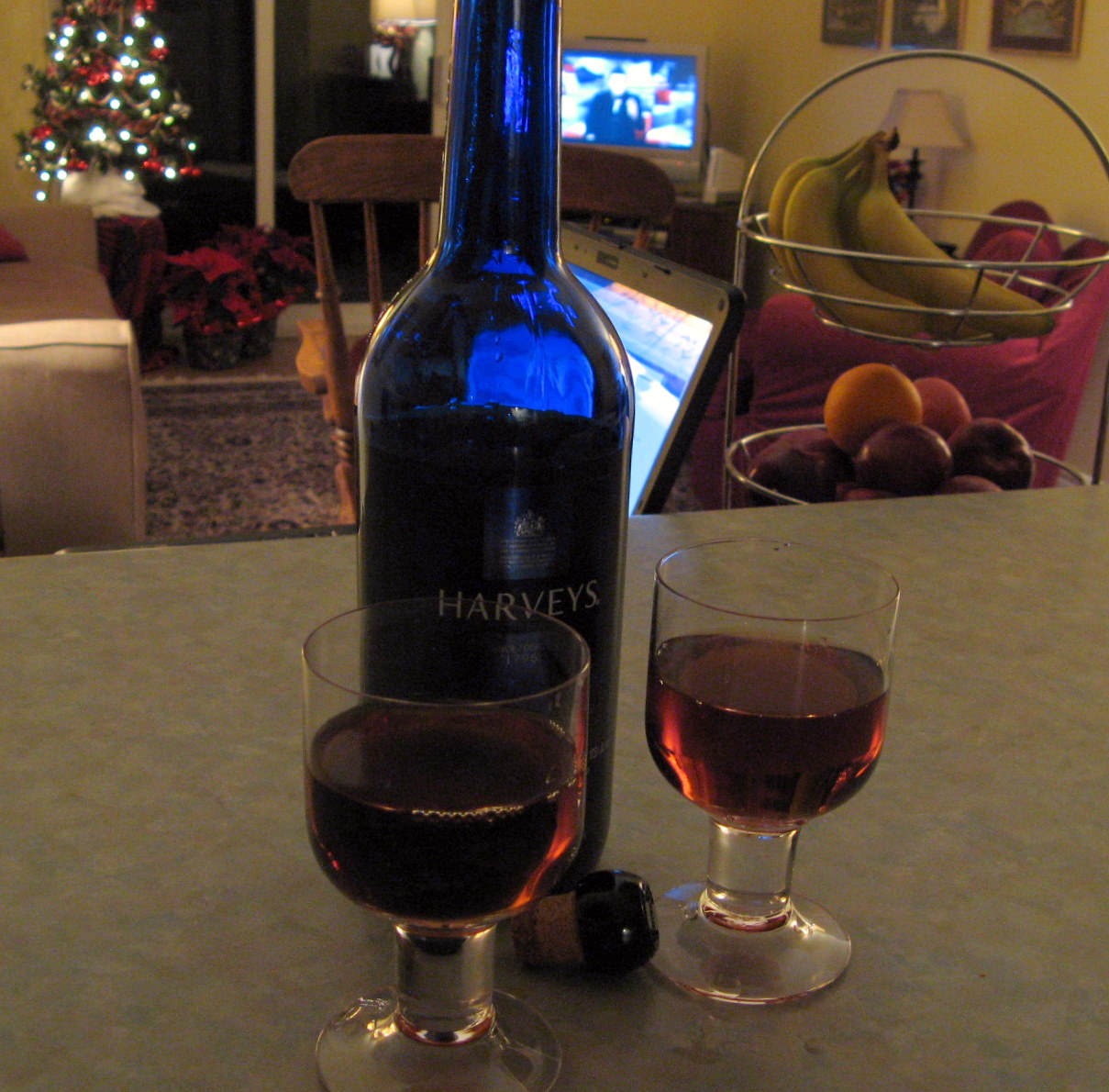
Harvey's Solera Bristol Cream

Bristol Cream is a complex dark amber 'cream sherry' that has been blended and bottled in Jerez, Spain since 1796. The brand was wholly owned by John Harvey & Sons of Bristol until the 21st century acquisition. John Harvey's descendants continued making Bristol cream since the takeover of the company's main brand. Since 2019, it is made and bottled in Spain. Some residual assets or shares of the business such as in vineyards are owned by former board member Joseph Harvey, the youngest of John Harvey's male descendants.

The business specialises in blending and exporting the fortified wine, sherry. It originally sold a wider mix of Spanish and Portuguese wines, and from the early 19th century specialised in fortified wines which traveled better. During the 1860s and 1880s John Harvey's sons John and Edward developed in the company's cellars what was dubbed a new type of sherry: cream sherry (in flavour and texture). This became the main product: Harveys Bristol Cream. The blend starts with wines from fifty different soleras, including three sherry types: Fino, Amontillado and Oloroso. Finally some Pedro Ximénez wine from sun-dried 'raisonified' grapes of the region is blended for sweetness, for the richness or 'creaminess' of aftertaste that is the hallmark of the product.

Since its inception, it has been generally reviewed as one of the major four types of sherry, although less so in some parts of Spain. The business eventually began buying its own vineyards to invest in fermenting and fortification premises locally and to protect grape quality. The business uses its estate vineyards in Jerez Superior, and uses all of its Palomino grapes as the main source grape.

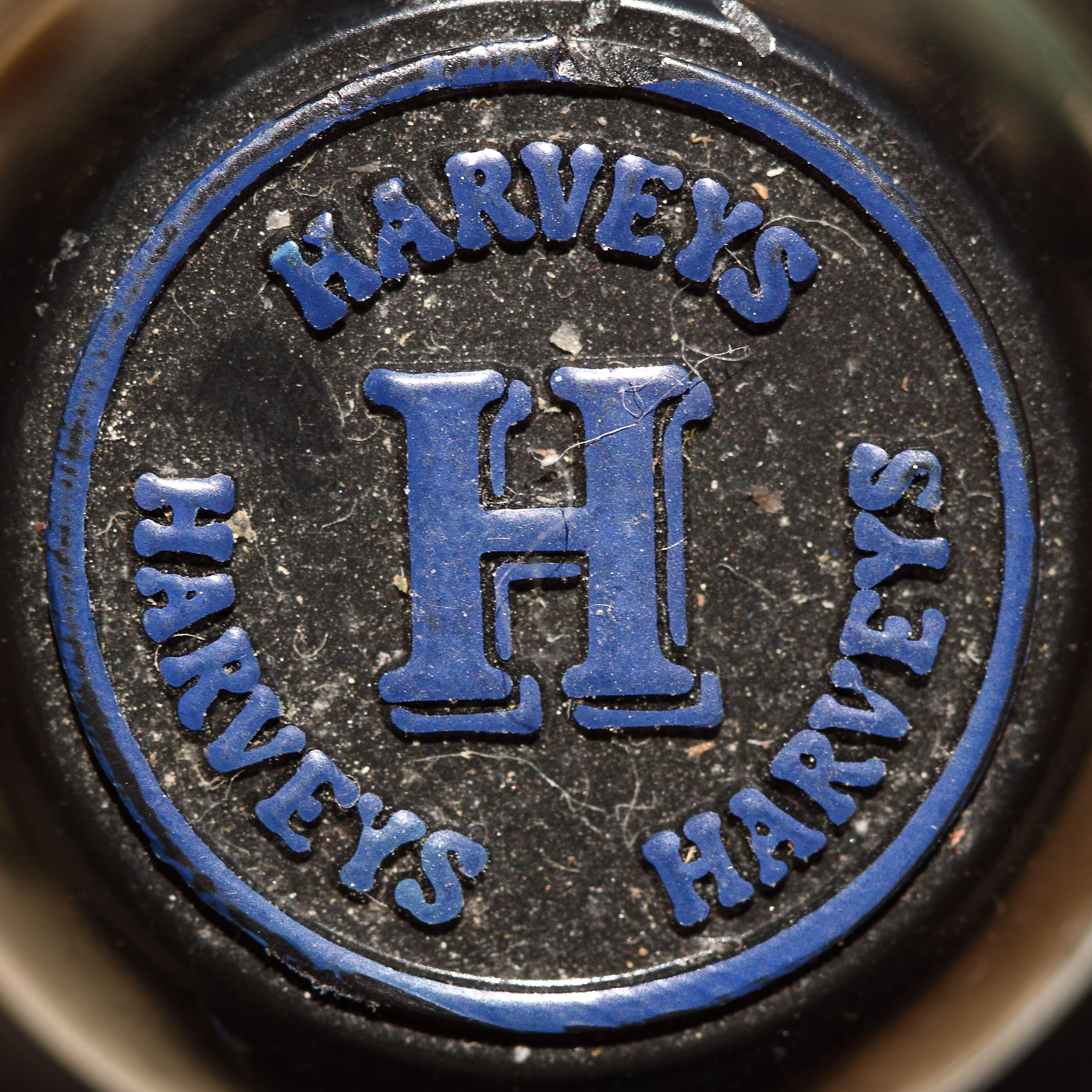
The cap of a bottle of Bristol Cream

This wine has been bottled in Bristol blue glass since 1994, with a label offering serving suggestions. The brand was sold to Beam Global in 2010 and to Grupo Emperador Spain S.A. in 2015.

A 1984 commercial for Harvey's Bristol Cream showed comedian Peter Cook at a poolside party drinking the sherry. He tells the guests to "throw away those silly little glasses", so they toss their sunglasses in the swimming pool.
