= Edward Adam =

French inventor (1768–1807)

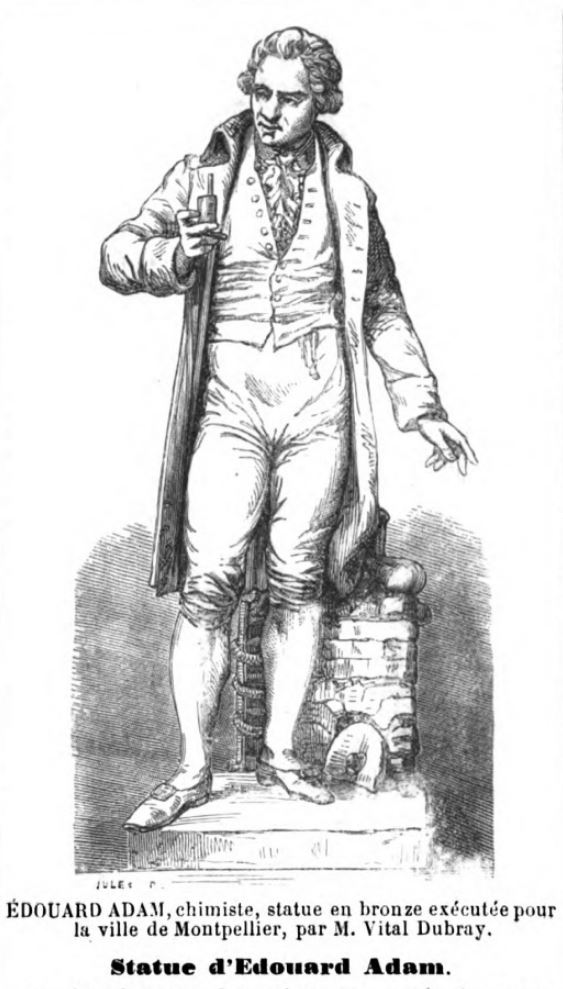
- Illustration of a statue of Edward Adam built in Montpellier, designed by Gabriel-Vital Dubray
- Born: 11 October 1768; Rouen, France
- Died: 11 November 1807 (aged 39); Montpellier, France
- Known for: Still modifications to improve chemical rectification
- Scientific career
- Fields: Chemistry

Edward Adam (11 October 1768 – 11 November 1807) was a French chemist who, beginning in 1800 while studying at Montpellier, invented various still modifications to improve rectification, upon which the industrialization of the manufacture of products such as liquor have since been based.

== Biography ==
Jean-Édouard Adam invented a distillation method that removed all spirit from wine, revolutionizing wine production in the Southern France, bringing it economic prosperity for a time, before being ruined by the loss of the many lawsuits he had to fight against his counterfeiters. Having registered a first patent in 1801 and another in 1805, his brother Gaspard Zacharie made further improvements through successive patents after his death.
