= Snaps =

Small shot of a strong alcoholic beverage taken during the course of a meal

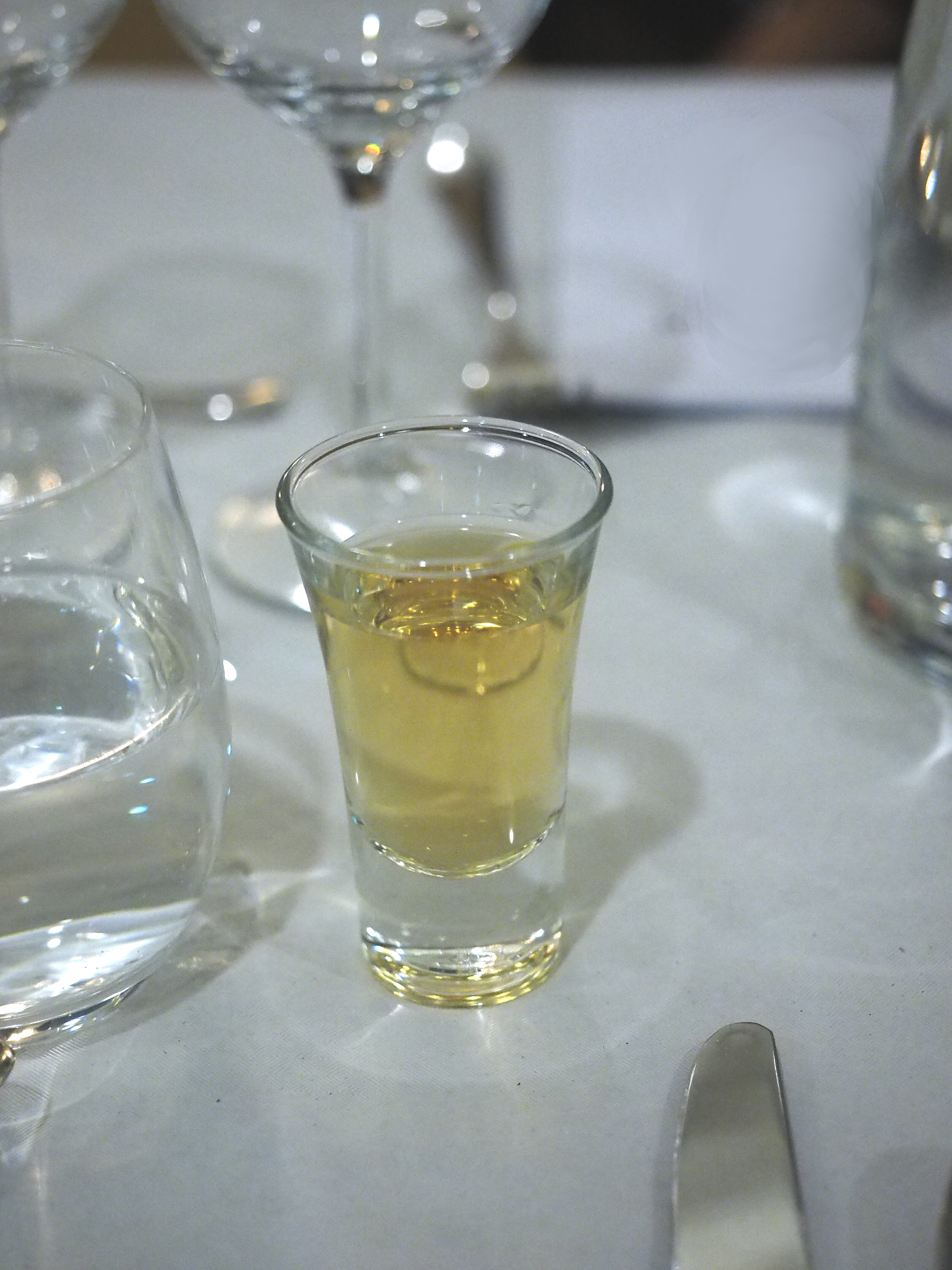
A snaps

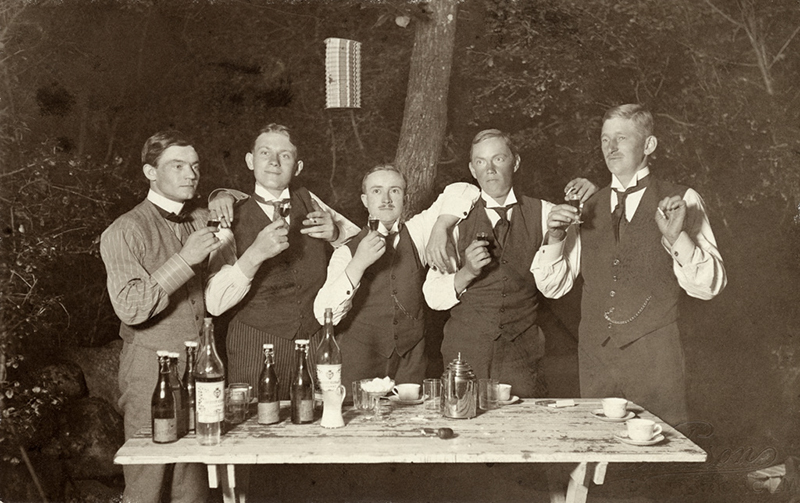
Snaps drinking in Sweden, early 20th century.

In the Nordic countries, especially Denmark and Sweden, but not in Iceland, snaps (pronounced [ˈsnaps], Finnish: snapsi), among many nicknames, is a small shot of a strong alcoholic beverage taken during the course of a meal.

In Denmark, a snaps will always be akvavit, although there are many varieties of it. In Sweden, snaps is a more general term for any small amount of "liquor"; although usually brännvin, it may also be other spirits, such as vodka, bitters/bitter liqueurs, whisky or brandy, etc. In Norway, a more common name is dram (from the unit of the same name). In Finland, one of the country's strongest alcoholic drinks, served as snaps, is Marskin ryyppy, named after Marshal C. G. E. Mannerheim.

The word "snaps" also has the same meaning as German Schnapps (German: [ʃnaps]), in the sense of "any strong alcoholic drink".

== Culture ==
=== Snaps shanties ===
Swedes, Danes and Swedish-speaking Finns have a tradition of singing songs, called snapsvisor ("snaps shanties"), before drinking snaps. These songs are typically odes to the joys of drinking snaps. They may praise the flavour of snaps or express a craving for it.

=== Festivities ===
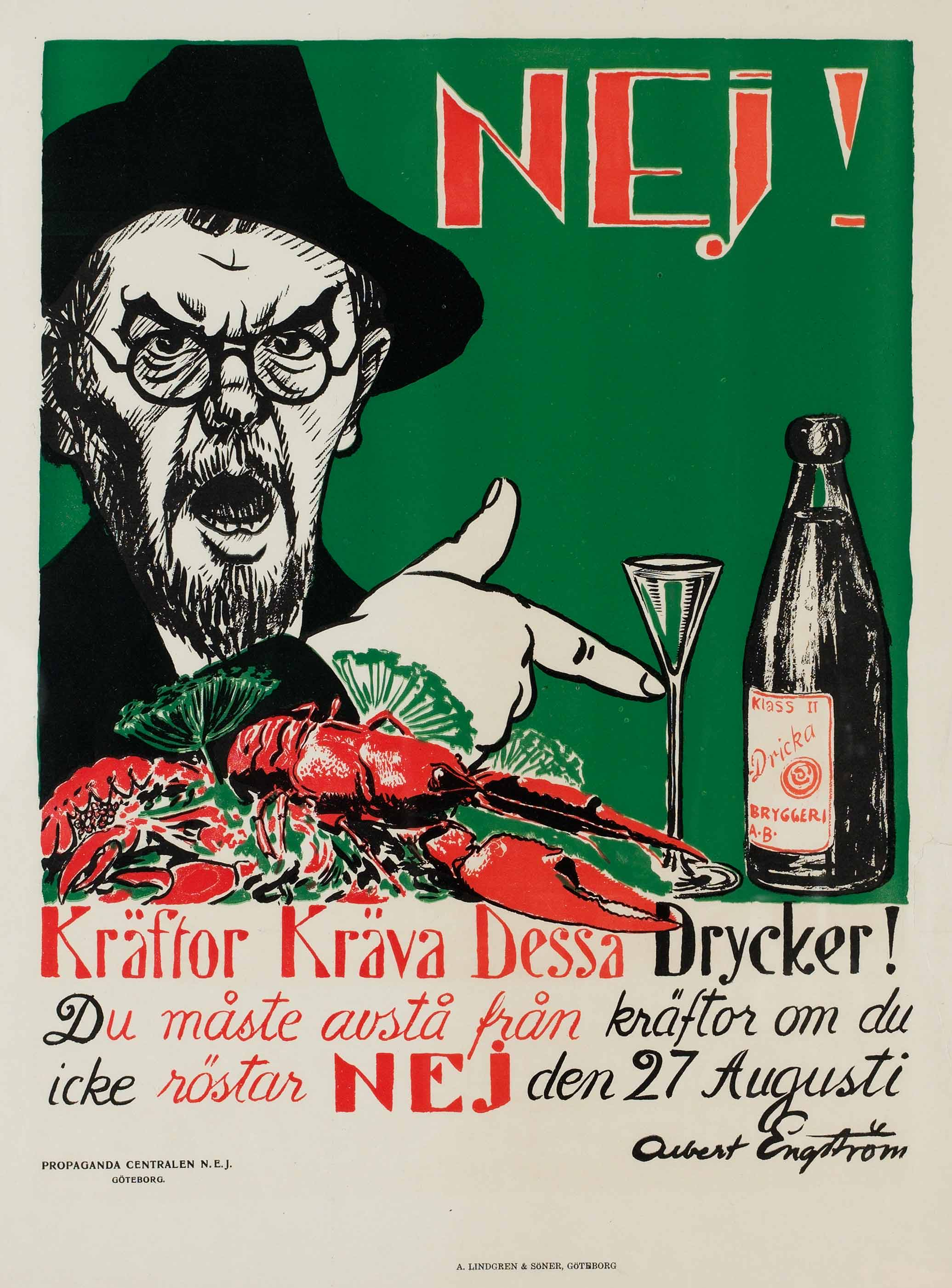
Poster used at the 1922 Swedish prohibition referendum, depicting a bottle of liquor and a glass for snaps together with cooked crayfish. The poster emphasizes that crayfish parties require snaps, and thus banning snaps would kill off crayfish parties with it. English: "No! Crawfishes demand these beverages! You have to forgo crawfishes unless you vote NO on 27 August"

Snaps and snapsvisor are essential elements of Swedish festivities involving food, especially Midsummer and crayfish parties (Swedish: kräftskiva), which are notoriously tipsy affairs. Dozens of songs may be sung during such a party, and every song requires a round of snaps. However, the glass need not be emptied every time.

=== Nicknames ===
Snaps has many nicknames, some of which are specific to particular regions. Some names are heavily associated with certain phrases used in conjunction with snaps drinking.

== See also ==
- Schnapps
- Drinking culture
- Moonshine
