= McDonald's Philippines =

Philippines division of McDonald's

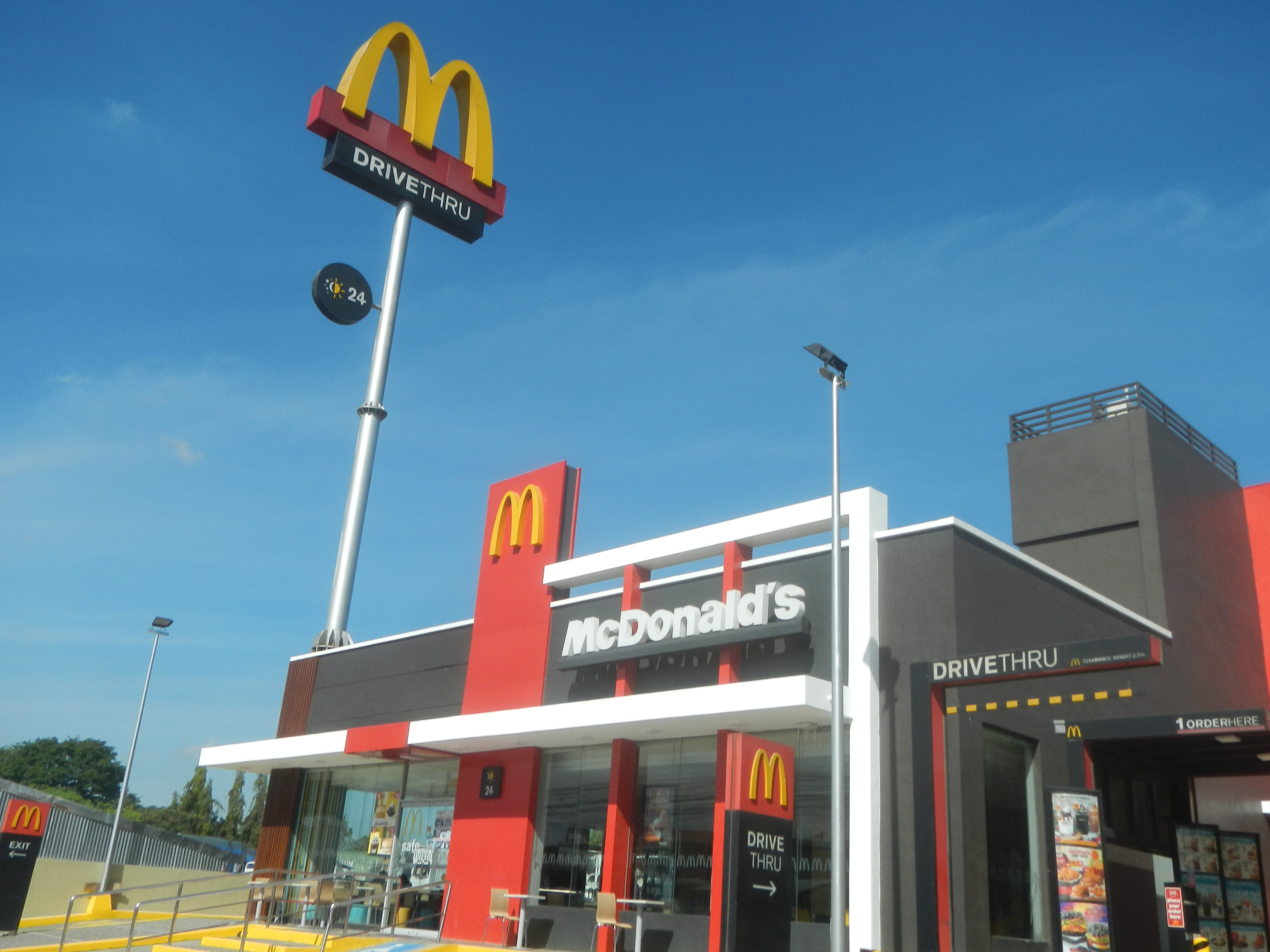
- A McDonald's outlet in Plaridel, Bulacan
- Type: Subsidiary
- Industry: Restaurants
- Genre: Fast-food restaurant
- Founded: September 27, 1981; 45 years ago Sampaloc, Manila
- Founder: George T. Yang
- Headquarters: 17th Floor, BDO Towers Paseo, 8741 Paseo de Roxas Avenue, Makati, Metro Manila, Philippines
- Number of locations: 740 (2024)
- Area served: Philippines
- Key people: George T. Yang (Chairman); Kenneth S. Yang (President and CEO); Margot B. Torres (Managing Director)
- Products: Hamburgers; rice; chicken; french fries; soft drinks; milkshakes; salads; desserts; pancake; coffee; breakfast; wraps
- Owner: Golden Arches Development Corporation
- Number of employees: 65,000 (2020)
- Parent: Alliance Global (rights licensed from McDonald's Corporation)
- Website: www.mcdonalds.com.ph

McDonald's Philippines, colloquially known by its clipped form McDo ([makˈdɔʔ]), is the master franchise of the multinational fast-food chain McDonald's in the Philippines. The franchise is held by the Golden Arches Development Corporation, a subsidiary of Alliance Global.

== History ==
=== Negotiations ===
McDonald's was introduced in the Philippines by Chinese-Filipino businessman George T. Yang, who resided in the United States in the 1970s, though he never patronized a McDonald's outlet during his stay. Aware of the fast food chain's success in North America and its increasing presence in other parts of the world, Yang researched fast-food business operations; in 1974, he contacted McDonald's headquarters in Illinois regarding a proposal for rights to open outlets in the Philippines. Yang's proposals were initially ignored, though he continued to remind the company regarding his business interest. In 1976, representatives of McDonald's International sent a delegation to the Philippines to conduct a feasibility study on establishing a presence in the Philippine market.

McDonald's International was also considering partnering with other local firms to establish a presence in the Philippines other than Yang. Yang sold himself as a "long-term partner" and volunteered to work in British Hong Kong where he networked with the business associate of the holder of the master franchise in the city and worked with the uniformed crew at an outlet in Kowloon. In 1980, McDonald's decided to award the master franchise to Yang and, shortly thereafter, set up the first Filipino McDonald's outlet along Morayta Street, within the University Belt area in Sampaloc, Manila the following year.

=== Entry and expansion ===
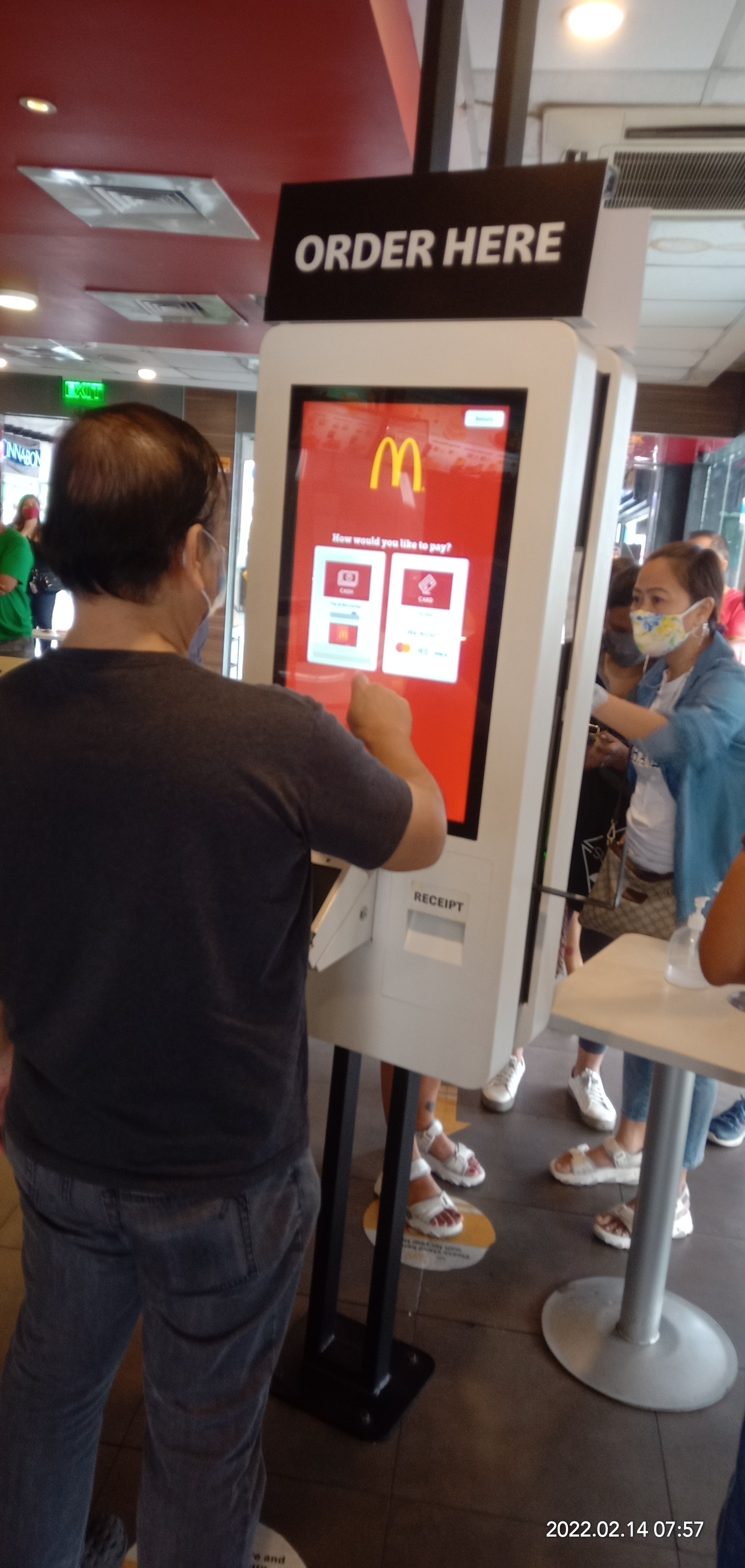
McDonald's self-ordering kiosk, a feature of NXTGEN

McDonald's entered the Philippine market in 1981 with McDonald's International partnering with Yang's McGeorge Food Industries due to the prohibition of majority foreign ownership in the country. This gave Yang's firm exclusive rights to manage the operations of McDonald's in the Philippines. By the 1990s, there were already 375 McDonald's outlets in the Philippines, with around 150 operated as local franchises.

In the mid-1980s, multinational fast food chains based abroad with presence in the Philippines began to introduce food items meant for the local market. During this time, McDonald's Philippines began to introduce meals served with steamed rice, spaghetti and fried chicken with gravy.

In 1991–1992, McDonald's expanded its reach to Visayas and Mindanao with the opening of new restaurants in Bacolod, Cebu City; and Cagayan de Oro, respectively. In 1996, George Yang launched the Ronald McDonald House Charities in the country.

By 2001, the operations of McDonald's in the Philippines were managed by two entities. McGeorge Food Industries served as the master franchise holder, while the Golden Arches Development Corporation (GADC), also owned by Yang, was responsible for operating more than 200 company-managed outlets across the country. That same year, a merger of the two entities was proposed, and in November 2002, the merger was approved by the Securities and Exchange Commission, with GADC as the surviving entity.

In 2005, the company concluded its deal with the American management as the Philippine division of McDonald's became a 100% Filipino-owned company when GADC teamed up with Alliance Global Group Inc., a company owned by businessman Andrew Tan, to buy the remaining stake owned by McDonald's Corporation in its local division.

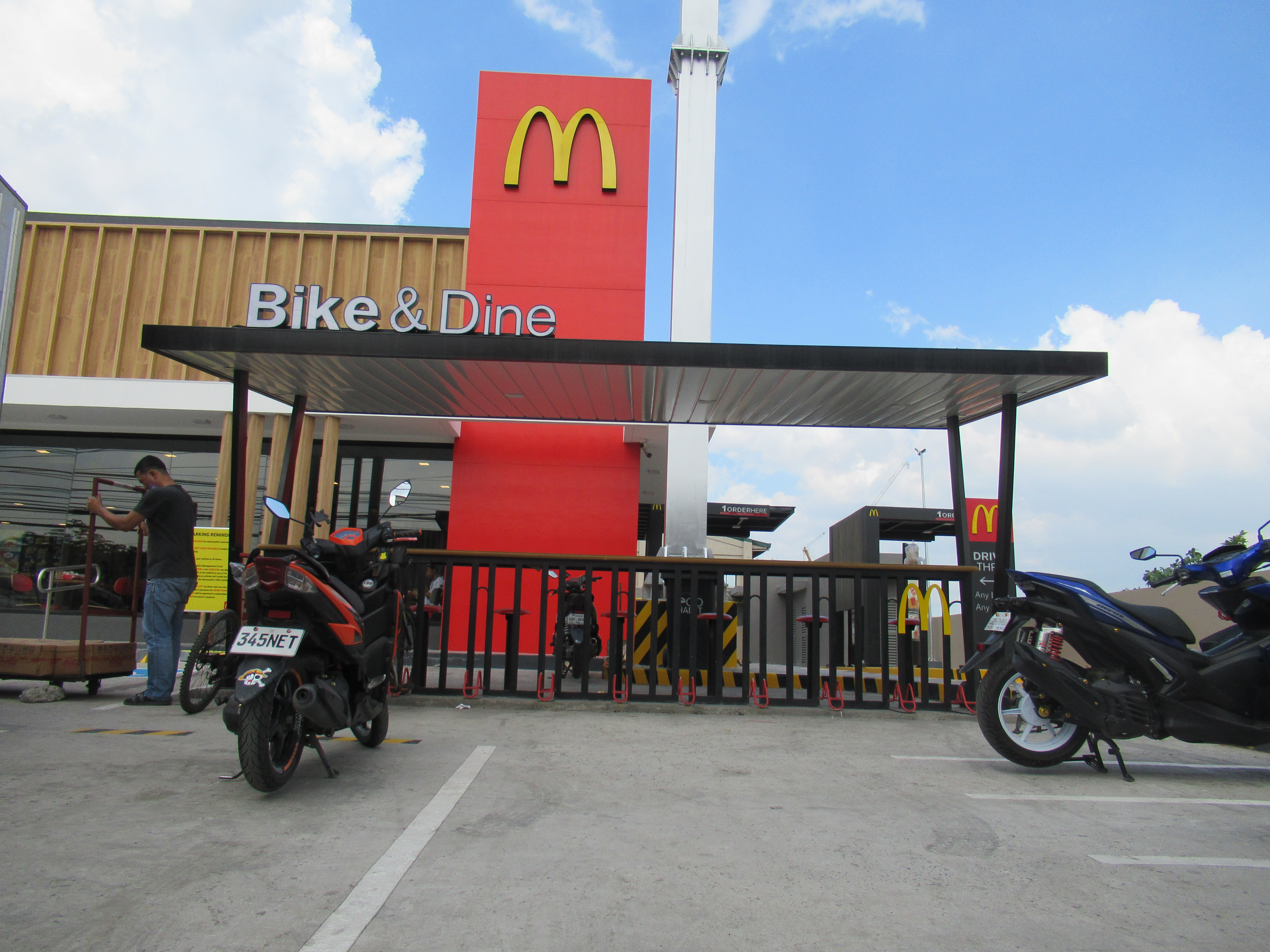
McDonald's Bike and Dine in Valenzuela, Metro Manila

In 2018, McDonald's Philippines introduced NXTGEN, bringing self-ordering kiosks, modernized menu boards, card payment acceptance, split counter system, and with the specially trained Guest Experience Leaders to the country. It opened its flagship NXTGEN branch at McKinley West in Taguig, Metro Manila on October 5.

In 2020, McDonald's Philippines closed down 30 stores after lease expirations and some financial concerns but opened 16 new stores despite the COVID-19 pandemic. In April 2021, it launched its first Green & Good store, promoting eco-sustainability, at United Nations Avenue corner Del Pilar Street in Ermita, Manila, as well as its Bike & Dine facilities which provides outdoor eating areas and bicycle parking for cyclists. On December 23, 2022, it opened its 700th store in Nuvali, Santa Rosa, Laguna.

In 2025, the McDonald's Philippines master franchise agreement was renewed for another 20 years. That same year, McDonald's Philippines opened its 800th store at the Davao Global Township in Davao City.

== Products ==
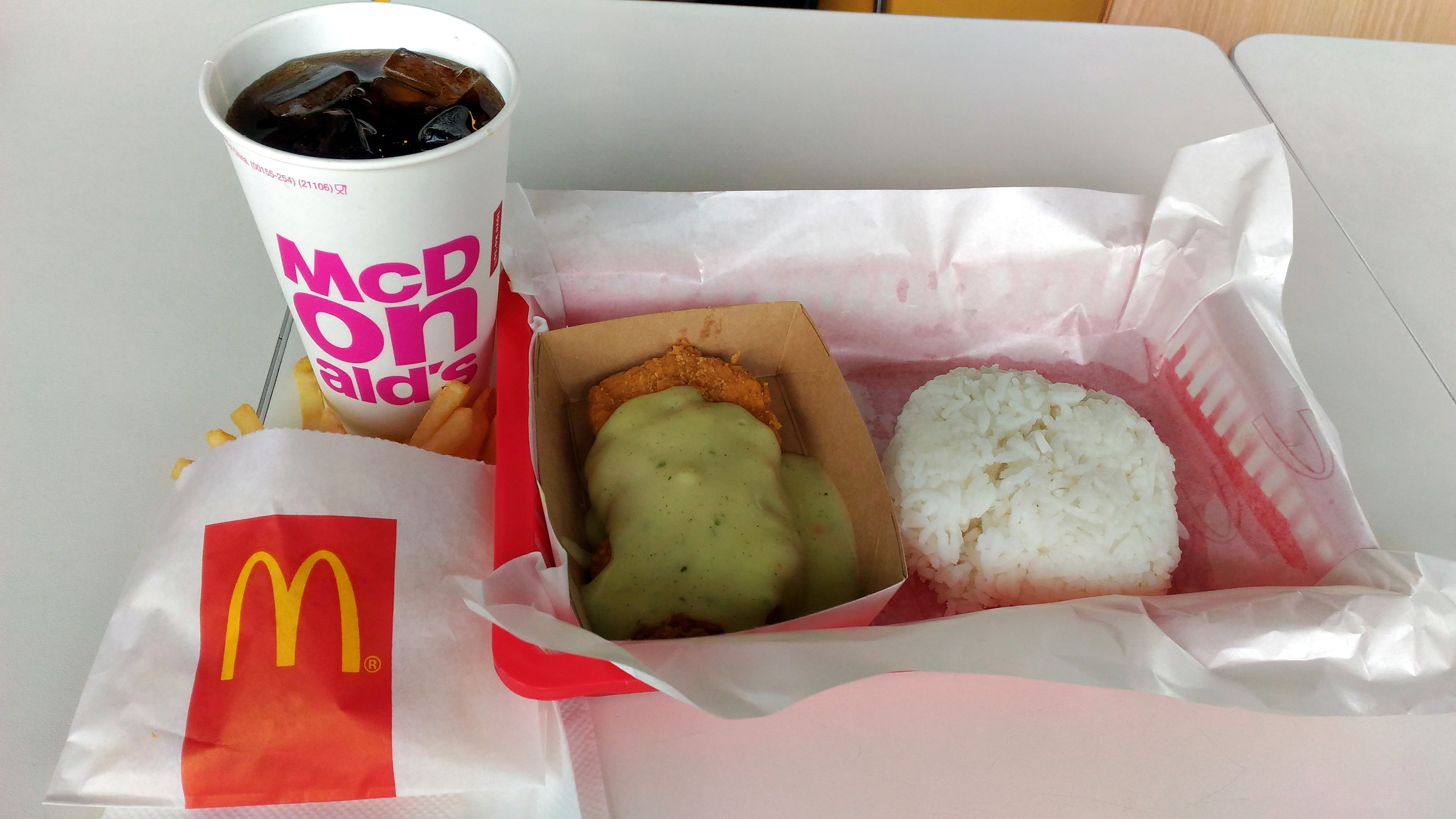
Chicken Fillet Ala King served with fries, cola and steamed rice

McDonald's Philippines maintains a menu catered towards the Filipino market. Among these items are:

- The McSpaghetti, a sweet tomato pasta with Frankfurter bits introduced in 1986.
- The Chicken McDo, a meal of fried chicken, steamed rice and gravy was introduced in 1987.
- The Burger McDo was introduced in 1993.
- Chicken Fillet Ala King, a meal of chicken fillet, steamed rice, and creamy white sauce with tiny bits of carrots and chives was introduced in 2015.
- Mushroom pepper steak rice bowls, featuring steamed white rice topped with a beef patty, creamy pepper sauce, and mushrooms, introduced in 2016.

In 2018–2019, they offered two limited edition burgers from McDonald's Japan, the Ebi Shrimp burger and the Teriyaki Samurai burger, under the collective named "Flavors of Japan" in the country. It also includes the Nori Shake Shake Fries and a Strawberry Sakura McFloat on its menu.

In June 23, 2026, they announced the discontinuation of their "Apple Pie". The product was phased out six days later.

== Competitors ==
Jollibee of the Jollibee Group is often referred to as McDonald's Philippines primary competitor. The Philippine fast food industry is led by Jollibee, with McDonald's placing second with The Economist in 2002 noting the Philippines as one of the few markets where McDonald's is not the leading fast food chain.

== Other policies ==
In 2013, McDonald's Philippines stated that it was not considering acquiring other brands or entering the Philippine Stock Exchange.
