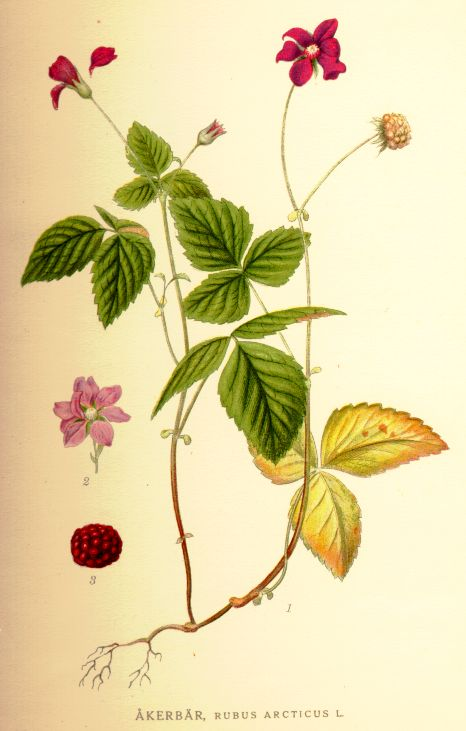
- From "Bilder ur Nordens Flora" (1917–1926)

Conservation status
- Least Concern (IUCN 3.1)

Scientific classification
- Kingdom: Plantae
- Clade: Tracheophytes
- Clade: Angiosperms
- Clade: Eudicots
- Clade: Rosids
- Order: Rosales
- Family: Rosaceae
- Genus: Rubus
- Species: R. arcticus

Binomial name
- Rubus arcticus L. 1753

Subspecies
- R. arcticus subsp. arcticus; R. arcticus subsp. acaulis; R. arcticus subsp. stellatus

Synonyms
- Cylastis arcticus (L.) Raf. ex B.D.Jacks.; Rubus arcticus subsp. humilis (Gladkova) Krassovsk.; Rubus arcticus var. humilis Gladkova; Rubus arcticus var. pentaphylloides Hult.; Manteia acaulis (Michx.) Raf.; Rubus acaulis Michx.; Manteia stellata (Sm.) Raf.; Rubus arcticus var. stellatus (Sm.) B.Boivin; Rubus stellatus Sm.

= Rubus arcticus =

Berry and plant

Rubus arcticus, the Arctic bramble or Arctic raspberry, Nagoonberry, or nectarberry is a species of slow-growing bramble belonging to the rose family, found in Arctic and alpine regions in the Northern Hemisphere. It has been used to create hybrid cultivated raspberries, the so-called nectar raspberries.

== Description ==
Rubus arcticus grows most often in acidic soils rich in organic matter. It is a thornless perennial up to 30 centimetres (12 inches) tall, woody at the base, but very thin higher above the ground. Flowers are in groups of 1–3, the petals pink, red, or magenta. The fruit is deep red or dark purple, consisting of 10 to 30 drupelets.

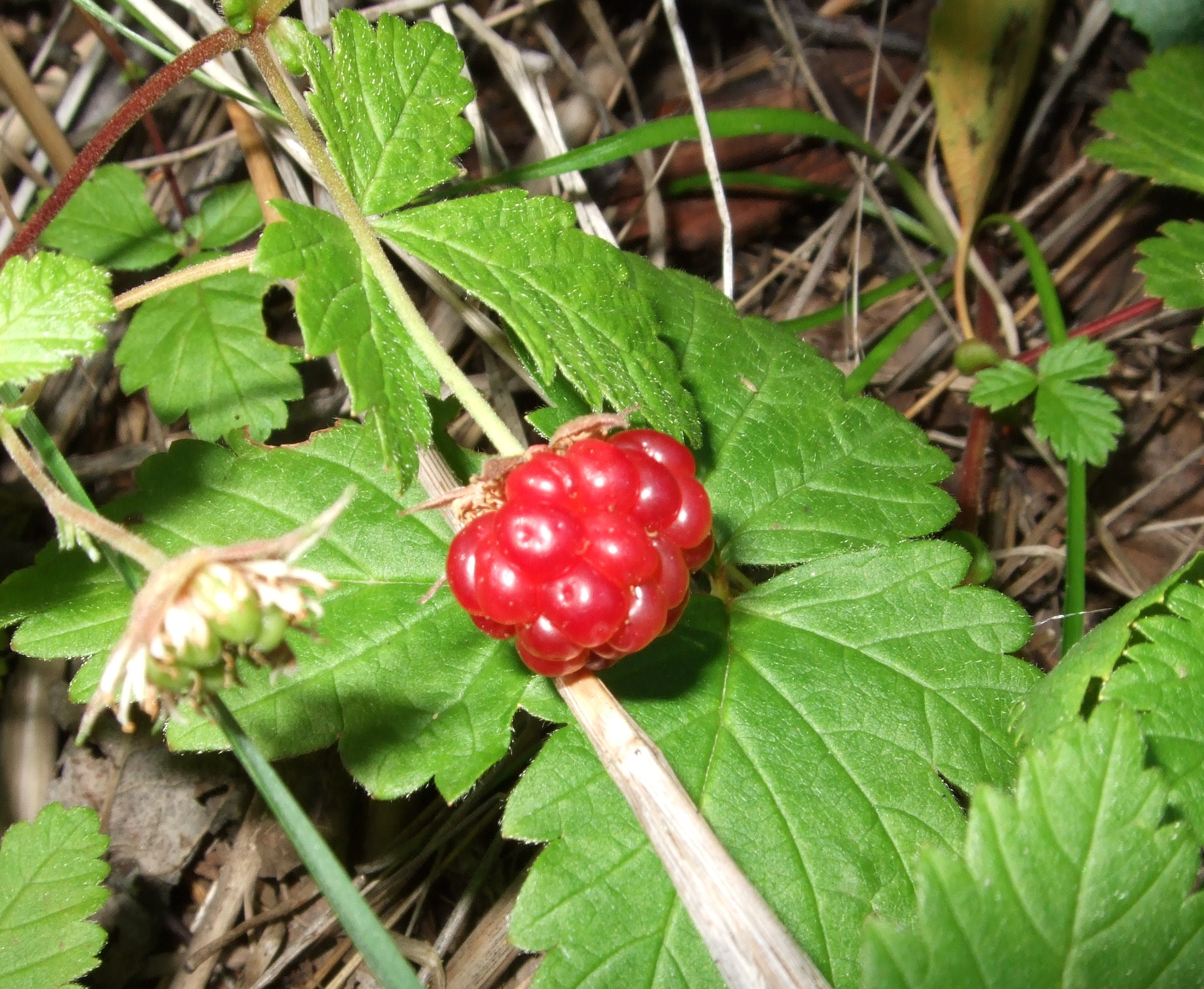
Ripe Arctic raspberry

== Distribution and habitat ==
It grows in Alaska, northern Scandinavia and Finland, Russia, Poland, Belarus, Mongolia, northeastern China, North Korea, Estonia, Lithuania, Canada, and the northern United States as far south as Oregon, Colorado, Michigan, and Maine. It was historically present in Scotland, last seen in 1850.

== Uses ==
The fruits of the Arctic raspberry are considered a delicacy and, among other uses, make jam and liqueur, or flavour tea. Carl von Linné considered the Arctic raspberry – åkerbär in Swedish – a great delicacy in his Flora Lapponica (1737). The fruit is used in the Mesimarja liqueur, produced since 1882 by the Finnish company Lignell & Piispanen. The liqueur was awarded a gold medal at the 1900 Paris Exposition.

In the Pacific Northwest of western Canada and the northwestern US, it is sometimes called the nagoon or nagoonberry, a name derived from the Tlingit neigóon. A measure of the quality of its fruit is expressed in its Russian name княженика knyazhenika, signifying the "berry of princes".

== Culture ==
Arctic raspberry is the provincial plant of the Norrbotten province of northern Sweden.

== See also ==
- Rubus chamaemorus – Cloudberry
