= George T. Yang =

- Born: September 12, 1938 (age 87); Tondo, Manila, Philippine Commonwealth
- Education: De La Salle University (B.A.); Wharton School of Finance (M.B.A.)
- Occupations: Businessman, singer
- Spouse: Kristine Yang
- Children: 4
- Musical career
- Genres: Classical, Opera
- Occupations: Businessman, diplomat, investor, singer
- Label: Universal Records
- Member of: Klassikal Music Foundation

George T. Yang is a Filipino businessman, investor, singer, and former diplomat who owns the master franchise of McDonald's in the Philippines through Golden Arches Development Corporation (GADC). He is the founder of McDonald's Philippines through the company GADC and opened the first branch in Morayta (now Nicanor Reyes Street) in 1981, then in Cubao before expanding to 700 branches nationwide.

== Early life and education ==
George T. Yang was born on September 12, 1938 in Tondo, Manila. He is the eldest among two sons and daughter of Yang Ing Kuong.

George's grandfather was an immigrant from China who would establish the United Insurance firm in the Philippines.

He also had a passion for singing since he was 12 years old but would only pursue a serious career in singing much later in life. Although coming from a Chinese family, him pursuing a career in singing was discouraged.

Yang attended the De La Salle University where he obtained his undergraduate degree. He also went to the United States to study at Wharton Business School at the University of Pennsylvania where he earned his Master's in Business Administration.

== Business career ==
=== Prior to McDonald's ===
Upon returning from the United States, Yang worked as an employee for two years. He worked as marketing manager for Bataan Cigarette Company while simultaneously serving as a consultant for Chinese companies in Binondo and teaching night school at the De La Salle University.

He also helped his wife set up Kristine Jewelry, a jewelry company.

=== McDonald's ===
In the 1970s, Yang looked to introduce the famed American hamburger franchise McDonald's across the Philippines. In 1974, he contacted McDonald's headquarters in Illinois regarding a proposal for obtaining the franchising rights to open various outlets in the Philippines. Yang's proposals were initially ignored, though he continued to remind the company regarding his business interest. In 1976, representatives of McDonald's International sent a delegation to the Philippines to conduct a feasibility study on establishing presence in the Philippine market.

McDonald's International was also considering partnering with other local firms in establishing presence in the Philippines' other than Yang. Yang sold himself as a "long term partner" and volunteered to work in British Hong Kong where he networked with the business associate of the holder of the master franchise in the city and worked with uniformed crew at an outlet in Kowloon. In 1980, McDonald's decided to award the master franchise to Yang and, shortly thereafter, set up the first Philippine McDonald's in Sampaloc, Manila the following year.

Yang's company which would manage the master franchise is named Golden Arches Development Corporation.

His son Kenneth, would be appointed as managing director in 2003. Kenneth would eventually become Golden Arches' president and CEO.

=== Other ventures ===
Aside from McDonald's Philippines, Yang also leads other companies including First Georgetown Ventures, HAVI Food Services (Philippines) and GEC Land Development Corp.

== Diplomatic career ==
Yang has also served as an honorary consul general to Eritrea. He was also elected as dean of the Consular Corps of the Philippines (CCP) in 2014.

== Music career ==
Yang is also a singer with classical and opera music as his main genre. He is signed under Universal Records.

He had formal training at an old age. He trained with Rachelle Gerodias, Raul Sunico, Raul Navarro, Lily Monteverde, and Gerard Salonga. Yang decided to return to his childhood past time of singing after being forced to take part at a karaoke session with guests at a bar in the late 1990s.

Jose Mari Chan, who was also his friend, convinced him to release his first CD, "Yang at Heart" in 2002. The album was followed by "Forever Yang", and "The Night is Yang". He also did collaborative performances with Chan.

He also did pop songs for McDonalds's television commercials and did acting roles in musicals.

He also founded the Klassikal Music Foundation in 2007 which provided classical music education to youth who could not afford to pursue a college degree in music.

== Awards and honors ==
His alma maters, De La Salle University and the José Rizal University have conferred him with honorary doctorate degrees.

== Personal life ==
George Yang is married to Kristine Yang with whom he has three sons and a daughter.

== Discography ==
- "Yang at Heart" (2002)
- "Forever Yang"
- "The Night is Yang"
- "Always Yang" (2007)
