= Blending (alcohol production) =

Technique in the production of alcoholic beverages

Blending is a technique in producing wine or other alcoholic beverages such as gueuze, consisting of mixing different brews.

In the case of rosé wine production, it is one of the techniques used, and involves mixing a white wine with some red wine.

In the case with single-vintage, single-varietal wines, the grapes harvested may be from the same yield, but fermented from different batches.

== See also ==
- Blended whiskey
