= Emperor (grape) =

Variety of grape

Emperor is a red Australian wine grape variety that is mainly grown as a table grape in South Australia and New South Wales but can be a blending component to fill out red blends. It is particularly well suited for hot climate viticulture.

== Synonyms ==
Various synonyms have been used to describe Emperor and its wines including Emperado, Genova, Genova rosa, Red Emperador and Red Emperor.
