= Rectified spirit =

Highly concentrated ethanol

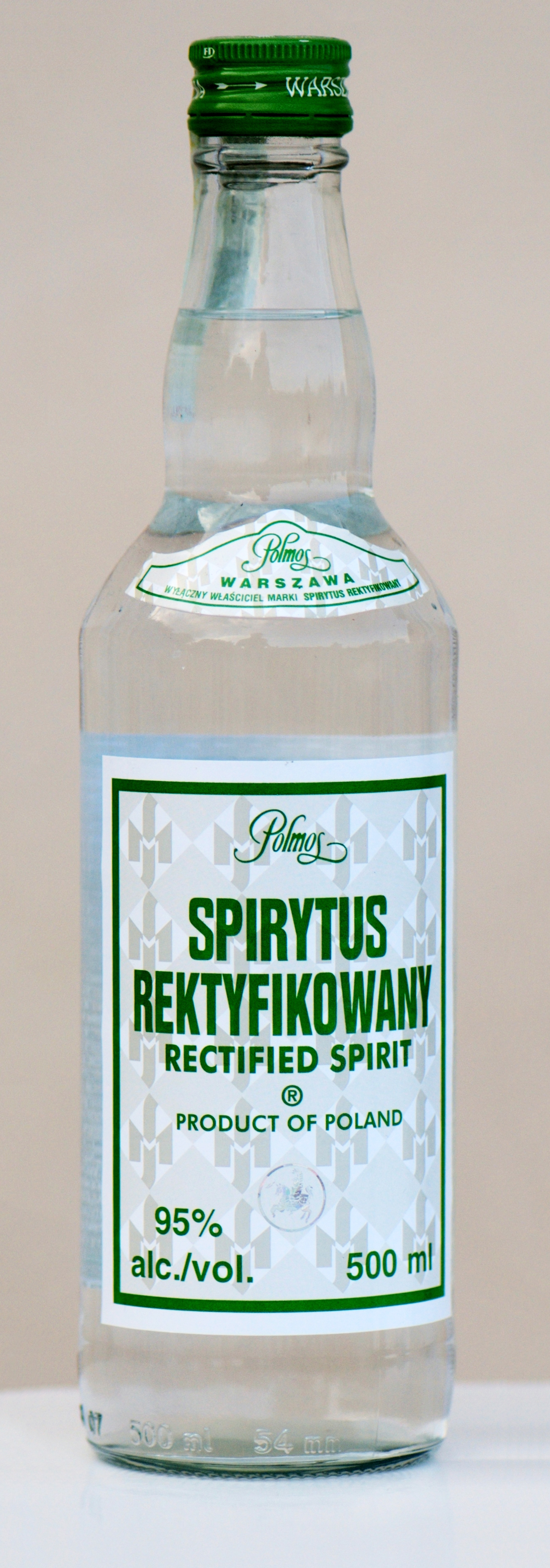
Rectified spirit made in Poland by Polmos

Rectified spirit, also known as neutral spirits, rectified alcohol or ethyl alcohol of agricultural origin, is highly concentrated ethanol that has been purified by means of repeated distillation in a process called rectification. In some countries, denatured alcohol or denatured rectified spirit may commonly be available as "rectified spirit", because in some countries (though not necessarily the same) the retail sale of rectified alcohol in its non-denatured form is prohibited.

The purity of rectified spirit has a practical limit of 97.2% ABV (95.6% by mass) when produced using conventional distillation processes, as a mixture of ethanol and water becomes a minimum-boiling azeotrope at this concentration. However, rectified spirit is typically distilled in continuous multi-column stills at 96–96.5% ABV and diluted as necessary. Ethanol is a commonly used medical alcohol — spiritus fortis is a medical term for ethanol solutions with 95% ABV.

Neutral spirits can be produced from grains, corn, grapes, sugar beets, sugarcane, tubers, or other fermentable materials such as whey. In particular, large quantities of neutral alcohol are distilled from wine and by-products of wine production (pomace, lees). A product made from grain is "neutral grain spirit", while a spirit made from grapes is called "grape neutral spirit" or "vinous alcohol". These terms are commonly abbreviated as either GNS or NGS.

Neutral spirits are used in the production of several spirit drinks, such as blended whisky, cut brandy, most gins, some liqueurs and some bitters. As a consumer product, it is generally mixed with other beverages, either to create drinks like alcoholic punch or Jello shots or to substitute for other spirits, such as vodka or rum, in cocktails. It is also used to make home made liqueurs, such as limoncello or Crème de cassis, and in cooking because its high concentration of alcohol acts as a solvent to extract flavors. Rectified spirit is also used for medicinal tinctures and as a household solvent. It is sometimes consumed undiluted; however, because the alcohol is so high-proof, overconsumption can cause alcohol poisoning more quickly than more traditional distilled spirits.

== Regional ==
=== United States ===
Neutral spirit is legally defined as spirit distilled from any material distilled at or above 95% ABV (190 US proof) and bottled at or above 40% ABV. When the term is used in an informal context rather than as a term of U.S. law, any distilled spirit of high alcohol purity (e.g., 170 proof or higher) that does not contain added flavoring may be referred to as neutral alcohol. Prominent brands of neutral spirits sold in the U.S. include:

- Brands made by Luxco:
  - Everclear
  - Crystal Clear
  - Golden Grain
- Gem Clear
- Graves Grain Alcohol

"Grain spirit" is a legal classification for neutral spirit that is distilled from fermented grain mash and stored in oak containers.

==== Retail availability ====
Availability of neutral spirit for retail purchase varies between states. States where consumer sales of high-ABV neutral spirit are prohibited include California, Florida, Hawaii, Maine, Maryland, Minnesota, New Hampshire, Nevada, North Carolina, Pennsylvania, Iowa, and West Virginia. In Virginia, the purchase of neutral spirits requires a no-cost "Grain Alcohol Permit", issued "strictly for industrial, commercial, culinary or medicinal use". In 2017, Virginia approved the sale of up to 151 proof neutral spirits at its ABC stores without a permit. Pennsylvania sells 151 proof without a permit but requires one for 190 proof.

=== European Union ===
==== Legal definition ====
Under EU regulations, alcohol used in the production of some spirit drinks must be "ethyl alcohol of agricultural origin", which has to comply with the following requirements:

- Organoleptic properties: no detectable taste other than that of the raw materials used in its production;
- minimum alcoholic strength by volume: 96.0%;
- maximum levels of residues do not exceed (in grams per hectolitre of 100% vol. alcohol):
  - acetic acid (total acidity): 1.5;
  - ethyl acetate (esters): 1.3;
  - acetaldehyde (aldehydes): 0.5;
  - 2-methyl-1-propanol (higher alcohols): 0.5;
  - methanol: 30;
  - nitrogen (volatile bases containing nitrogen): 0.1;
  - dry extract: 1.5;
  - furfural: not detectable.

==== Germany ====
In Germany, rectified spirit is generically called Primasprit (colloquial) or, more technically, Neutralalkohol. It is available in pharmacies, bigger supermarkets, and East European markets. In the former East Germany, it was available in regular stores. Primasprit is most often used for making homemade liqueurs; other types of use are rare. Most of the Primasprit produced in Germany is made from grain and is, therefore, a neutral grain spirit.

Neutralalkohol by Lautergold and Weinhof Peschke both have an ABV of 96.6%.

==== Poland ====
Spirytus Rektyfikowany made by Polmos is the most notable brand with 96% ABV, while in fine and luxury cases, increases to 96.5% ABV. It is often claimed to be the strongest liquor in the world. Spirytus Delikatesowy by Polmos is at 95% ABV. Spirytus Luksusowy by Dębowa Polska is at 96.5% ABV.

==== Norway ====
The import and sale of spirits containing more than 60% alcohol by volume is prohibited, so only weaker grain spirits are permitted.

=== Latin America ===
==== Bolivia ====
Bolivia has its own form of rectified spirit made using sugar cane or coca leaves, called cocoroco, which is as high as 96% ABV.

== Moonshine ==
- A column still or spiral still can achieve a vapor alcohol content of 95% ABV.
- Moonshine is usually distilled to 40% ABV, and seldom above 66% based on 48 samples. For example, conventional pot stills commonly produce 40% ABV, and top out between 60 and 80% after multiple distillations. However, ethanol can be dried to 95% ABV by heating 3Å molecular sieves such as 3Å zeolite.

== See also ==
- Distilled beverage
- Vodka
- Edward Adam
