= Andrew Tan =

Filipino businessman

Andrew Lim Tan
- Born: 1952 (age 73–74); Quanzhou, Fujian, China
- Citizenship: Philippines
- Education: University of the East
- Occupations: Businessman; investor
- Known for: Founder, Chairman, and President of Megaworld Corporation; Chairman and CEO of Alliance Global Group, Inc.
- Spouse: Katherine Lim
- Children: 4

Andrew Lim Tan (traditional Chinese: 吳聰滿; simplified Chinese: 吴聪满) is a Chinese-born Filipino business magnate and investor. His conglomerate companies Alliance Global Group, Inc. and Megaworld Corporation presides a wide extension of business interests in real estate, liquor, casinos, high-technology, resorts, and restaurants. In 2011, Forbes magazine rated him fourth on the list of the "Philippines 40 richest" with an estimated net worth of $2 billion. As of March 2026, Forbes magazine ranks him as the eighth-wealthiest person in the Philippines with a net worth of US$1.7 billion.

== Early life ==
Originally an immigrant from China and a supporter of the Communist Party, Tan was born in Quanzhou, Fujian province. He spent his childhood at an apartment in Hong Kong which was shared by other families. Later, he moved to Manila where he studied accounting at University of the East.

== Companies ==
Tan runs the Alliance Global Group Inc. (AGI). It is composed of three companies:

- Megaworld Corporation – A real estate corporation engaged in developing condominiums. It has subsidiaries called Empire East Land Holdings and Suntrust Properties. It was dubbed by Finance Asia, a business tabloid, as the "best managed company" and the "best in corporate governance" in the Philippines for 2006.
- Emperador Distillers, Inc. – Best known for its Emperador Brandy which became the world's best-selling brandy in 2006, and Emperador Light. What made it successful was how it was promoted. Instead of following other liquor advertisements that feature attractive women and other dainty images, the ads of Emperador Brandy emphasize successes in life and moral values.
- Golden Arches Development Corporation – Operates McDonald's franchises.

== Awards and recognitions ==
The government of Quezon City honored Tan as "Businessman of the Year" for 2004.

He is the first to receive the PropertyGuru Asia "Icon Award" for 2018.

== Personal life ==
Andrew is married with four children and lives in Manila, Philippines. His eldest son, Kevin L. Tan (traditional Chinese: 吳凱文; simplified Chinese: 吴凯文), was appointed CEO of Alliance Global Group Inc. in 2018. His other son, Kendrick Tan, is an executive director in Emperador, Inc.

His youngest child, Kester Tan, lives in Singapore with his wife Kelsey Cheng Tan, who is a naturalized Singaporean.

== See also ==
- Alfonso A. Uy
- Edgar Sia
- Lucio Tan
- John Gokongwei
- Tony Tan Caktiong
