= Alliance Global =

Philippine conglomerate

Alliance Global, Inc.
- Type: Public
- Traded as: PSE: AGI
- Industry: Conglomerate
- Founded: Manila, Philippines; October 12, 1993; 32 years ago
- Founder: Andrew Lim Tan
- Headquarters: Headquarters: 7th Floor, 1880 Eastwood Avenue, Eastwood City CyberPark, Eastwood Avenue, Bagumbayan, Quezon City, Metro Manila, Philippines; Attached Offices: Alliance Global Tower, 36th Street corner 11th Avenue, Uptown Bonifacio, Bonifacio Global City, Taguig, Metro Manila, Philippines
- Area served: Worldwide
- Key people: Andrew Lim Tan (Chairman); Kevin L. Tan (Vice Chairman, CEO, President and COO)
- Revenue: ▲ ₱174.56 billion (2019)
- Net income: ▲ ₱27.1 billion (2019)
- Website: https://www.allianceglobalinc.com/

Alliance Global, Inc. (AGI), styled on its logo as AllianceGlobal and also known as Alliance Global Group, is a Philippine conglomerate founded in 1993, it is a large holding company with business activities spanning the food and beverage industry (including both production and restaurant operations), gambling, and real estate development.

It is one of the largest conglomerates in the Philippines, and is managed by the family of its chairman and CEO Andrew Lim Tan. In 2017, the company moved its headquarters to Uptown Bonifacio in Bonifacio Global City, Taguig, Metro Manila.

On June 1, 2024, AGI announced the appointment of Kevin Andrew Tan, as president and chief operations officer of AGI, replacing Kingson Sian.

== Subsidiaries ==
Alliance Global Group is composed of several companies, including:

=== Food & Beverage ===
- Emperador Inc. – the company's beverage production arm best known for its Emperador brandy, which became the world's best-selling brandy (by volume) in 2006. In 2014, Emperador Inc. purchased the Scottish whisky company Whyte and Mackay from India-based United Spirits Ltd for £430m. In 2015, Emperador Inc. made a deal with Beam Suntory for the purchase of several brands and production facilities for P13.8 billion (275 million euros). The deal with Beam Suntory included the purchase of Fundador from its owner, descendants of Pedro Domecq, and Bodegas Fundador (Spain's largest and oldest brandy dating to 1730 with facilities in Jerez and Tomelloso), Terry Centenario (Spain's top-selling brandy), Tres Cepas (Equatorial Guinea's top brandy brand), and Harveys (the UK's top brand of sherry).
- The Bar Vodka

=== Real Estate ===
- Empire East Land Holdings Inc. (PSE:ELI) – a spun off company from Megaworld made to accommodate the middle-income market
- Megaworld Corporation – the company's main real estate arm.
  - Megaworld Lifestyle Malls – the company's retail and commercial arm that develops its malls.
- Suntrust Properties Inc.
- Since 2001: First Centro, Inc.

=== Hospitality ===
- Golden Arches Development Corp – 49% ownership
  - McDonald's Philippines – main franchise in the Philippines.
- Travellers International Hotel Group, Inc. - is the developer of Resorts World Manila and operates a gaming facility with hotel, retail, dining, leisure and entertainment attractions.

=== Infrastructure ===
- Infracorp Development Inc. - the infrastructure company of the Alliance Global Group Inc.

=== Others ===
- Agile Digital Ventures
- Global Estate Resorts Inc.
- Alliance Global Solution
  - Pickaroo - Online Delivery App.
- Newport World Resorts - along with the Genting Group
- Since 2022: Total Airport Services (TAS), passenger and cargo handling specialist

=== Legal issue ===
In April 2024, the Philippine Stock Exchange imposed fines on AGI for violations of Sections 17.6 and 17.13 of Article VII, 2023 Consolidated Listing and Disclosure Rules (failing to regularly report on shareholder information).
