= Lignell & Piispanen =

Alcoholic beverages manufacturer in Finland

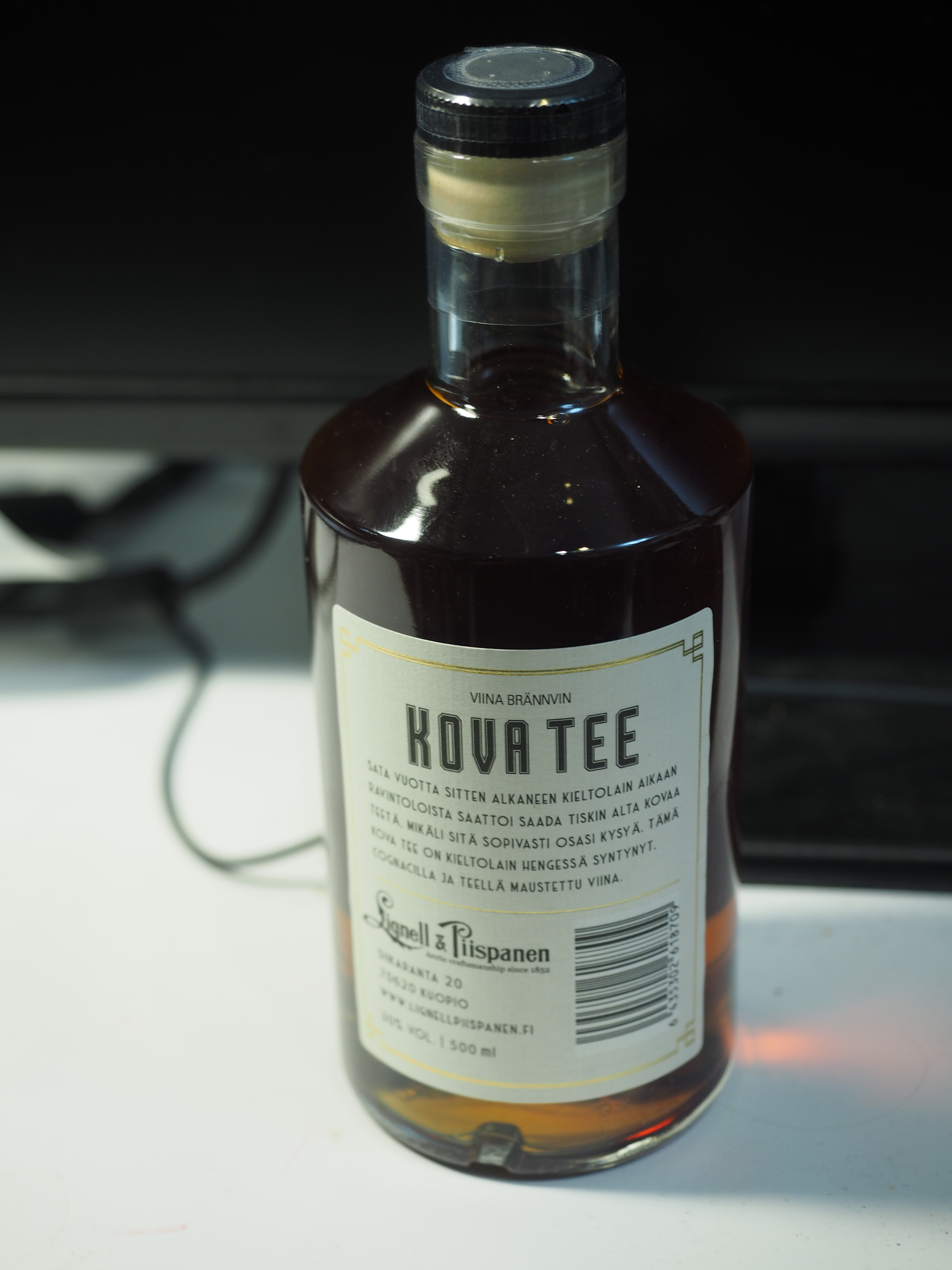
During prohibition in Finland, "kova tee" ("hard tea") was used as a codeword for alcohol. In honour of this, Lignell & Piispanen launched a tea-flavoured vodka named "Kova Tee".

Lignell & Piispanen (L&P) is a Finnish company from Kuopio, manufacturing alcoholic beverages. Its parent company Oy Gust. Ranin was founded in 1852 and the trademark and products of Lignell & Piispanen were merged into it in 1932.

== History ==
In 1783, a distillery was built on the site of the current factory. In 1856, O.W. Roering's vodka distillery was founded in the same area, and two years later it was bought by brandy and rum importer Gustav Ranin. In 1882, pharmacists Lignell and Piispanen started manufacturing Arctic raspberry liqueur and other alcoholic beverages. Production ended in 1919 because of Finnish prohibition, and when the prohibition was repealed in 1932, Lignell and Piispanen's alcohol plant was sold to Gustav Ranin. In 1985, a new factory was built for the company.

In 1995, when the Finnish alcohol law changed, the traditional drinks were added back to the company's product list. Before the legal change, the company manufactured 8 to 10 drinks, now about 50. The annual production is about 2 million bottles and it employs about 30 people. About 70 to 75 percent of the products are sold to Alko, 20 to 25 percent are exported and 5 percent are sold through wholesale companies to restaurants. In 2009, the company bought the trademark to the Marskin ryyppy shot.

The company has had disputes with the EU court about the word konjakki (cognac). According to the EU court, genuine French cognac may not be called "konjakki", but must be called by its original French name "cognac". This dispute started with the Hienoa Konjakkia product ("Fine Cognac"), containing cognac made in the French region of Cognac. The product's name was changed to Ranin Cognac after Gustav Ranin.

== Historically important products ==
- Sawon viina, 1869
- Mesimarjalikööri (Arctic raspberry liqueur), the company's first liqueur, from 1882. The product was awarded a gold medal at the Paris World Fair in 1900, as well as in Copenhagen in 1888 and in Saint Petersburg in 1895.

== Founders and developers ==
- Hugo Lignell (5 April 1841 – 3 May 1890), pharmacist and merchant, kauppaneuvos 1890.
- August Piispanen (14 June 1844 – 24 January 1906), pharmacist, kunnallisneuvos 1893.
- Gustav Ranin (1825–1896), wholesale merchant, ship outfitter.
